= 2009 World Amateur Boxing Championships – Light heavyweight =

Boxing competitions

The Light heavyweight competition was the third-highest weight class featured at the 2009 World Amateur Boxing Championships, and was held at the Mediolanum Forum. Heavyweights were limited to a maximum of 81 kilograms in body mass.

== Medalists ==
Gold	Artur Beterbiyev; Russia
Silver	Elshod Rasulov; Uzbekistan
Bronze	Jose Larduet; Cuba
Bronze	Abdelkader Bouhenia; France

== Seeds ==
1. (Algeria) Abdelhafid Benchabla (third round)
2. (Uzbekistan) Elshod Rasulov (final)
3. (Republic of Ireland) Kenny Egan (quarterfinals)
4. (India) Dinesh Kumar (quarterfinals)
5. (Russia) Artur Beterbiyev (champion)
6. (Hungary) Imre Szellő (first round)
7. (Cuba) Jose Larduet (semifinals)
8. (Lithuania) Daugirdas Semiotas (second round)

== Draw ==
=== Finals ===
Quarterfinals
Carlos Góngora (ECU)	6
Jose Larduet (CUB)	10
Artur Beterbiyev (RUS)	RSC
Dinesh Kumar (IND)
Kenny Egan (IRL)	9
Abdelkader Bouhenia (FRA)	17
Rene Krause (GER)	2
Elshod Rasulov (UZB)	8

Semifinals
Jose Larduet (CUB)	6
Artur Beterbiyev (RUS)	10
Abdelkader Bouhenia (FRA)	4
Elshod Rasulov (UZB)	8

Final
Artur Beterbiyev (RUS)	13
Elshod Rasulov (UZB)	10

=== Top half ===
==== Section 1 ====
Round 1

Round 2
Abdelhafid Benchabla (ALG)	20
Vladimir Cheles (MDA)	11
Carlos Góngora (ECU)	15
Gianluca Rosciglione (ITA)	1
Revaz Karelishvili (GEO)	10
Eemeli Katajisto (FIN)	4
Robert Brant (USA)	8
Jose Larduet (CUB)	17

Round 3
Abdelhafid Benchabla (ALG)	10
Carlos Góngora (ECU)	13
Revaz Karelishvili (GEO)	5
Jose Larduet (CUB)	15

Quarterfinals
Carlos Góngora (ECU)	6
Jose Larduet (CUB)	10

==== Section 2 ====
Round 1

Round 2
Artur Beterbiyev (RUS)	RSCH
Jammal Layej (IRQ)
Babacar Kamara (SWE)	16
Ioannis Militopoulos (GRE)	5
Constantin Bejenaru (ROU)	17
Önder Özgül (TUR)	9
Vladimir Reznicek (CZE)	7
Dinesh Kumar (IND)	15

Round 3
Artur Beterbiyev (RUS)	11
Babacar Kamara (SWE)	1
Constantin Bejenaru (ROU)	7
Dinesh Kumar (IND)	19

Quarterfinals
Artur Beterbiyev (RUS)	RSC
Dinesh Kumar (IND)

=== Bottom half ===
==== Section 3 ====
Round 1
Hrvoje Sep (CRO)	16
Siarhei Karneyeu (BEL)	10
Botti Bi Leandro (CIV)
Jeysson Monroy Varela (COL)	WO
Ahmad Alteimat (JOR)	4
Sandagsürengiin Erdenebayar (MGL)	10
Maxwell Amponsah (GHA)	RSC
Campbell Kirmani (JAM)
Daniyar Ustembayev (KAZ)	8
Abdelkader Bouhenia (FRA)	20
Elnur Gadirov (AZE)	5
Daugirdas Semiotas (LTU)	9

Round 2
Kenny Egan (IRL)	RSC
Mohammad Qadir Sultani (AFG)
Hrvoje Sep (CRO)	8
Jeysson Monroy Varela (COL)	16
Sandagsürengiin Erdenebayar (MGL)	9
Maxwell Amponsah (GHA)	9
Abdelkader Bouhenia (FRA)	11
Daugirdas Semiotas (LTU)	7

Round 3
Kenny Egan (IRL)	16
Jeysson Monroy Varela (COL)	7
Sandagsürengiin Erdenebayar (MGL)	5
Abdelkader Bouhenia (FRA)	17

Quarterfinals
Kenny Egan (IRL)	9
Abdelkader Bouhenia (FRA)	17

==== Section 4 ====
Round 1
Imre Szellő (HUN)	7
Kim Dong Hoe (KOR)	13
Mario Lakatos (SVK)	1
Rene Krause (GER)	11
Oleksandr Hvozdyk (UKR)	14
Nikolajs Grisunins (LAT)	6
Dzemal Bosniac (BIH)	7
Faye Assane (SEN)	10
Meng Fanlong (CHN)	17
Bosko Draskovic (MNE)	6
Gilbert Castillo Rivera (DOM)	DSQ
Lennon Bannis (DMA)
Moussa Konate (MLI)	5
Joshua Ndere (KEN)	18
Ainar Karlson (EST)	3
Elshod Rasulov (UZB)	19

Round 2
Kim Dong Hoe (KOR)	1
Rene Krause (GER)	5
Oleksandr Hvozdyk (UKR)	RSCI
Faye Assane (SEN)
Meng Fanlong (CHN)	2
Gilbert Castillo Rivera (DOM)	14
Joshua Ndere (KEN)	2
Elshod Rasulov (UZB)	13

Round 3
Rene Krause (GER)	+2
Oleksandr Hvozdyk (UKR)	2
Gilbert Castillo Rivera (DOM)	1
Elshod Rasulov (UZB)	11

Quarterfinals
Rene Krause (GER)	2
Elshod Rasulov (UZB)	8

== See also ==
- Boxing at the 2008 Summer Olympics – Light heavyweight
