= 2011 World Amateur Boxing Championships – Light heavyweight =

Boxing competitions

The Light heavyweight competition was the third-heaviest class featured at the 2011 World Amateur Boxing Championships, held at the Heydar Aliyev Sports and Exhibition Complex. Heavyweights were limited to a maximum of 81 kilograms (179 lb) in body mass.

== Medalists ==
Gold	Julio César la Cruz (CUB)
Silver	Adilbek Niyazymbetov (KAZ)
Bronze	Egor Mekhontsev (RUS)
Bronze	Elshod Rasulov (UZB)

== Seeds ==
1. (Russia) Egor Mekhontsev (semifinals)
2. (Republic of Ireland) Joseph Ward (third round)
3. (Croatia) Hrvoje Sep (second round)
4. (Germany) Enrico Kölling (third round)
5. (Australia) Damien Hooper (quarterfinals)
6. (South Korea) Kim Hyeong-kyu (second round)
7. (Uzbekistan) Elshod Rasulov (semifinals)
8. (Azerbaijan) Ramil Aliyev (third round)
9. (Hungary) Imre Szellő (second round)
10. (Brazil) Yamaguchi Falcao (third round)
11. (Tunisia) Yahia El-Mekachari (second round)
12. (India) Dinesh Kumar (third round)

== Draw ==
=== Finals ===
Semifinals
1	Egor Mekhontsev (RUS)	15
4	Julio César la Cruz (CUB)	21
3	Adilbek Niyazymbetov (KAZ)	11
2	Elshod Rasulov (UZB)	9

Final
Julio César la Cruz (CUB)	17
Adilbek Niyazymbetov (KAZ)	13

=== Top half ===
==== Section 1 ====
First round
Ainar Karlson (EST)	18
Ioannis Militopoulos (GRE)	8
Chingis Borbashev (KGZ)	22
Levan Guledani (GEO)	24
Yoshitsuna Okada (JPN)
Marcus Browne (USA)	RSCH
Imre Szello (HUN)	21
Kennedy Katende (SWE)	10
Oleksandr Hvozdyk (UKR)	RSCH
Jovan Young (JAM)
Georginel Hau (ROM)	13
Rasul Yuldashev (TKM)	17

Second round
Egor Mekhontsev (RUS)	19
Ainar Karlson (EST)	12
Levan Guledani (GEO)	6
Marcus Browne (USA)	10
Imre Szello (HUN)	11
Oleksandr Hvozdyk (UKR)	25
Rasul Yuldashev (TKM)	6
Ramil Aliyev (AZE)	23

Third round
Egor Mekhontsev (RUS)	14
Marcus Browne (USA)	6
Oleksandr Hvozdyk (UKR)	17
Ramil Aliyev (AZE)	15

Quarterfinals
Egor Mekhontsev (RUS)	27
Oleksandr Hvozdyk (UKR)	21

==== Section 2 ====
First round
Elmohamady Elalfy (EGY)	12
Ahmad Alteimat (JOR)	13
Bosko Drasković (MNE)	17
Maxwell Amponsah (GHA)	7
Deepak Maharjan (NEP)	8
Dinesh Kumar (IND)	20
Caner Sayak (TUR)	19
Kriangkai Sukkhum (THA)	10
Mikhail Dauhaliavets (BLR)	11
Julio César la Cruz (CUB)	25
Reece Papuni (NZL)	10
Sandagsürengiin Erdenebayar (MGL)	18

Second round
Damien Hooper (AUS)	15
Ahmad Alteimat (JOR)	9
Bosko Drasković (MNE)	DSQ
Dinesh Kumar (IND)
Caner Sayak (TUR)	7
Julio César la Cruz (CUB)	17
Sandagsürengiin Erdenebayar (MGL)	4
Enrico Koelling (GER)	12

Third round
Damien Hooper (AUS)	16
Dinesh Kumar (IND)	7
Julio César la Cruz (CUB)	8
Enrico Koelling (GER)	6

Quarterfinals
Damien Hooper (AUS)	13
Julio César la Cruz (CUB)	14

=== Bottom half ===
==== Section 3 ====
First round
Lenon Bannis (DMA)	DSQ
Džemal Bošnjak (BIH)
Meng Fanlong (CHN)	23
Dario Alfaro (MEX)	9
Daugirdas Šemiotas (LTU)	13
Marko Nikolić (SRB)	9
Yahia El-Mekachari (TUN)	13
Simone Fiori (ITA)	11
Jeysson Monroy (COL)	18
Alexander Ullenes (NOR)	7
Adilbek Niyazymbetov (KAZ)	16
Vladimir Cheles (MDA)	11

Second round
Hrvoje Sep (CRO)	8
Džemal Bošnjak (BIH)	17
Meng Fanlong (CHN)	20
Daugirdas Šemiotas (LTU)	9
Yahia El-Mekachari (TUN)	8
Jeysson Monroy (COL)	14
Adilbek Niyazymbetov (KAZ)	14
Kim Hyeong-kyu (KOR)	9

Third round
Džemal Bošnjak (BIH)	6
Meng Fanlong (CHN)	13
Jeysson Monroy (COL)
Adilbek Niyazymbetov (KAZ)	KO

Quarterfinals
Meng Fanlong (CHN)	8
Adilbek Niyazymbetov (KAZ)	19

==== Section 4 ====
First round
Keddy Agnes (SEY)	14
Dariel Ebanks Pol (CAY)	15
Carlos Gongora (ECU)	RSC
Osmar Bravo (NCA)
Amine Azzouzi (MAR)	5
Yamaguchi Falcao (BRA)	17
Felix Valera (DOM)	14
Igor Jakubowski (POL)	16
Artur Khachatryan (ARM)	8
Ehsan Rouzbahani (IRI)	15
Stoimen Dimitrov (BUL)
Dilovarsho Abdurakhmonov (TJK)	RSC

Second round
Elshod Rasulov (UZB)	22
Dariel Ebanks Pol (CAY)	5
Carlos Gongora (ECU)	18
Yamaguchi Falcao (BRA)	25
Igor Jakubowski (POL)
Ehsan Rouzbahani (IRI)	RSCI
Dilovarsho Abdurakhmonov (TJK)	4
Joe Ward (IRL)	22

Third round
Elshod Rasulov (UZB)	17
Yamaguchi Falcao (BRA)	12
Ehsan Rouzbahani (IRI)	+15
Joe Ward (IRL)	15

Quarterfinals
Elshod Rasulov (UZB)	15
Ehsan Rouzbahani (IRI)	7
