= Boxing at the 2016 Summer Olympics – Men's light heavyweight =

Boxing competitions

Men's light heavyweight boxing at the Games of the XXXI Olympiad
- Venue: Riocentro – Pavilion 6
- Date: 6–18 August 2016
- Competitors: 26 from 26 nations

Medalists
1st place, gold medalist(s)		Julio César La Cruz	Cuba
2nd place, silver medalist(s)		Adilbek Niyazymbetov	Kazakhstan
3rd place, bronze medalist(s)		Mathieu Bauderlique	France
3rd place, bronze medalist(s)		Joshua Buatsi	Great Britain

The men's light heavyweight boxing competition at the 2016 Summer Olympics in Rio de Janeiro was held from 6 to 18 August at the Riocentro.

== Schedule ==
All times are Brasília Time (UTC−3).

Date	Time	Round
Saturday, 6 August 2016	12:38	Round of 32
Sunday, 7 August 2016	12:57	Round of 32
Wednesday, 10 August 2016	13:01	Round of 16
Thursday, 11 August 2016	13:43	Round of 16
Sunday, 14 August 2016	14:07	Quarter-finals
Tuesday, 16 August 2016	12:45	Semi-finals
Thursday, 18 August 2016	15:30	Final

== Results ==
=== Finals ===
Semi-finals
Julio César La Cruz (CUB)	3
Mathieu Bauderlique (FRA)	0
Joshua Buatsi (GBR)	0
Adilbek Niyazymbetov (KAZ)	3

Final
Julio César La Cruz (CUB)	3
Adilbek Niyazymbetov (KAZ)	0

=== Top half ===
Round of 32
Mehmet Nadir Ünal (TUR)	WO^{1}
Hassan Saada (MAR)
Hrvoje Sep (CRO)	2
Abdelrahman Salah (EGY)	1
Michel Borges (BRA)	3
Hassan N'Dam N'Jikam (CMR)	0
Erkin Adylbek Uulu (KGZ)	0
Juan Carlos Carrillo (COL)	3
Serge Michel (GER)	0
Carlos Andres Mina (ECU)	3

Round of 16
Julio César La Cruz (CUB)	3
Mehmet Nadir Ünal (TUR)	0
Hrvoje Sep (CRO)	0
Michel Borges (BRA)	3v
Mathieu Bauderlique (FRA)	3v
Juan Carlos Carrillo (COL)	0
Carlos Andres Mina (ECU)	2v
Joe Ward (IRL)	1

Quarter-finals
Julio César La Cruz (CUB)	3
Michel Borges (BRA)	0
Mathieu Bauderlique (FRA)	TKO
Carlos Andres Mina (ECU)

Semi-finals
Julio César La Cruz (CUB)	3
Mathieu Bauderlique (FRA)	0

^{1} Saada was ejected from the competition after he was arrested for sexual assault the day before the opening ceremony.

=== Bottom half ===
Round of 32
Kennedy Katende (UGA)
Joshua Buatsi (GBR)	TKO
Petr Khamukov (RUS)	1
Albert Ramirez (VEN)	2
Peter Müllenberg (NED)	3
Ehsan Rouzbahani (IRI)	0
Teymur Mammadov (AZE)	3
Denys Solonenko (UKR)	0
Valentino Manfredonia (ITA)	1
Mikhail Dauhaliavets (BLR)	2

Round of 16
Elshod Rasulov (UZB)
Joshua Buatsi (GBR)	KO
Albert Ramirez (VEN)	0
Abdelhafid Benchabla (ALG)	2
Peter Müllenberg (NED)	0
Teymur Mammadov (AZE)	3
Mikhail Dauhaliavets (BLR)	0
Adilbek Niyazymbetov (KAZ)	3

Quarter-finals
Joshua Buatsi (GBR)	3
Abdelhafid Benchabla (ALG)	0
Teymur Mammadov (AZE)	0
Adilbek Niyazymbetov (KAZ)	3

Semi-finals
Joshua Buatsi (GBR)	0
Adilbek Niyazymbetov (KAZ)	3
