= Adilbek Niyazymbetov =

Kazakhstani boxer (born 1989)

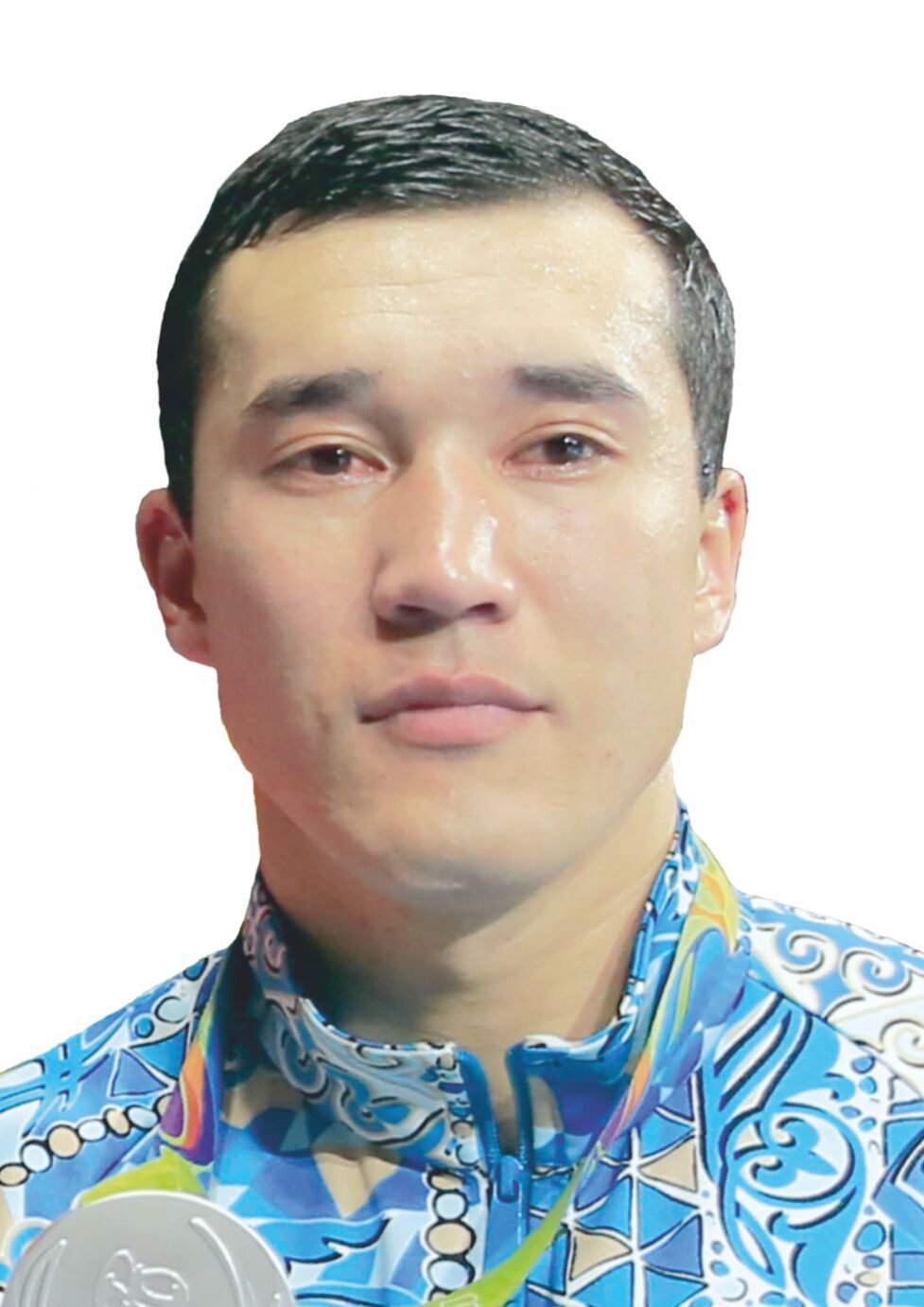

Personal information
- Native name: Әділбек Сәбитұлы Ниязымбетов
- Nationality: Kazakh
- Born: 19 May 1989 (age 37) Nukus, Uzbek SSR, Soviet Union
- Height: 181 cm (5 ft 11 in)
- Weight: 81 kg (179 lb)

Sport
- Country: Kazakhstan
- Sport: Boxing
- Event: light heavyweight
- Coached by: Myrzagali Aitzhanov (national) Marat Jakiyev (personal)
Medal record
Representing Kazakhstan
Olympic Games
Silver medal – second place	2012 London	-81 kg
Silver medal – second place	2016 Rio de Janeiro	-81 kg
World Amateur Championships
Silver medal – second place	2011 Baku	-81 kg
Silver medal – second place	2013 Almaty	-81 kg
Asian Games
Gold medal – first place	2014 Incheon	-81 kg
Asian Championships
Silver medal – second place	2013 Amman	-81 kg
Gold medal – first place	2015 Bangkok	-81 kg

Adilbek Sabituly Niyazymbetov (Kazakh: Әділбек Сәбитұлы Ниязымбетов; born 19 May 1989) is an Uzbekistani-born amateur light-heavyweight boxer who competes for Kazakhstan. He won silver medals at the world championships in 2011 and 2013 and at the Summer Olympics in 2012 and 2016.

== Career ==
At the 2011 World Amateur Boxing Championships he qualified for the Olympics by winning silver. He beat Jeysson Monroy, Meng Fanlong and Elshod Rasulov but lost the final to Cuban Julio César la Cruz.

At the 2012 Olympics he beat Carlos Góngora from Ecuador, Iranian Ehsan Rouzbahani 13–10, and Ukrainian Oleksandr Gvozdyk 13:13 on countback before losing the final to Russian favorite Egor Mekhontsev 15:15, again on countback.

At the 2016 Summer Olympics, he beat Mikhail Dauhaliavets, Teymur Mammadov and Joshua Buatsi before losing to Julio César La Cruz in the final.
