= Carlos Góngora =

Ecuadorian boxer (born 1989)

Personal information
- Born: Carlos Gongora Mercado; April 25, 1989 (age 37) Esmeraldas, Ecuador
- Height: 6 ft 1 in (1.85 m)
- Weight: Super middleweight

Boxing career
- Reach: 72 in (183 cm)
- Stance: Southpaw

Boxing record
- Total fights: 26
- Wins: 22
- Win by KO: 17
- Losses: 4
Medal record
Men's Boxing
Representing Ecuador
Pan American Games
| Bronze medal – third place | 2007 Rio | Middleweight |
| Bronze medal – third place | 2011 Guadalajara | Light Heavyweight |
South American Games
| Silver medal – second place | 2006 Buenos Aires | Middleweight |
| Gold medal – first place | 2010 Medellin | Light Heavyweight |

Carlos Góngora Mercado (born April 25, 1989) is an Ecuadorian professional boxer who held the IBO super middleweight title from 2020 to 2021. As an amateur, he won a bronze medal at the 2007 Pan American Games in Rio in the men's middleweight division.

== Amateur career ==
=== Middleweight ===
At the 2006 South American Games southpaw Góngora lost the final to Venezuelan Alfonso Blanco. At the 2007 Pan American Games the then 18-year-old from El Coca easily beat Blanco 20:6 in a rematch before losing to the eventual winner Emilio Correa from Cuba in the semis 13:21.

At the 2007 World Championships he beat Ivano del Monte but ran into superstar and eventual winner Matvey Korobov and lost when the referee stopped the contest.

At the Copa Independencia 2008 he reached the final but lost to old foe Correa 3:16. At the Olympic qualifier he lost once again to Correa but qualified nevertheless after beating fighters like Shawn Estrada.

At the 2008 Olympics he won his first matches against German Konstantin Buga and Greek Georgios Gazis 12:1 but a surprise quarter final loss to Indian Vijender Singh kept him from winning a medal.

=== Light Heavyweight ===
Góngora moved up to light heavyweight after the 2008 Olympics. He didn't win a medal at the 2009 World Amateur Boxing Championships. He won his first match against Gianluca Rosciglione 15:1, and his second against Abdelhafid Benchebla 13:10 but lost in the quarter-final to José Larduet 10:6.

In 2010 he beat Yamil Peralta and Roaner Angulo to win the South American Games.

He won another bronze at the 2011 Pan American Games, losing to Julio César la Cruz. He again did not win a medal at the 2011 World Amateur Boxing Championships. He beat Osman Bravo (contest stopped due to injury) but lost his next match against Yamaguchi Falcão (25:18).

He lost to Marcus Browne at the American Olympic Qualifying Tournament but managed to qualify for the Olympics 2012.

At the 2012 Olympics, Góngora won his first match against Azerbaijani Vatan Huseynli. Góngora then lost his next match, in the round of 16, against Kazakh Adilbek Niyazymbetov. Niyazymbetov would go on to the finals.

== Professional boxing record ==
| 25 fights | 22 wins | 3 losses |
|---|---|---|
| By knockout | 17 | 0 |
| By decision | 5 | 3 |

| No. | Result | Record | Opponent | Type | Round, time | Date | Location | Notes |
|---|---|---|---|---|---|---|---|---|
| 25 | Loss | 22–3 | Lester Martínez | UD | 10 | 28 Jun 2024 | Entertainment and Sports Arena, Washington, D.C., U.S. | |
| 24 | Win | 22–2 | Jhon Teheran | KO | 2 (8), 0:45 | 12 Sep 2023 | Coliseo de Pescaito David Ruiz Ureche, Santa Marta, Colombia | |
| 23 | Loss | 21–2 | Christian M'billi | UD | 12 | 23 Mar 2023 | Montreal Casino, Montreal, Canada | For WBC Continental Americas and WBA International super middleweight title |
| 22 | Win | 21–1 | Oscar Riojas | TKO | 4 (8), 1:08 | 13 Aug 2022 | Memorial Hall, Melrose, Massachusetts, U.S. | |
| 21 | Loss | 20–1 | Lerrone Richards | SD | 12 | 18 Dec 2021 | AO Arena, Manchester, England | Lost IBO super middleweight title |
| 20 | Win | 20–0 | Christopher Pearson | KO | 7 (12), 2:17 | 17 Apr 2021 | Seminole Rock Hotel and Casino, Hollywood, Florida, U.S. | Retained IBO super middleweight title |
| 19 | Win | 19–0 | Ali Akhmedov | KO | 12 (12), 1:57 | 18 Dec 2020 | Seminole Hard Rock Hotel & Casino, Hollywood, Florida, U.S. | Won IBO super middleweight title |
| 18 | Win | 18–0 | Elie Augustama | UD | 6 | 31 Jan 2020 | Castlefon Banquet & Conference Center, Windham, New Hampshire, U.S. | |
| 17 | Win | 17–0 | Alan Zavla | KO | 1 (10), 2:05 | 23 Aug 2019 | Encore Boston Harbour, Everett, Massachusetts, U.S. | |
| 16 | Win | 16–0 | Damian Ezequiel Bonelli | UD | 10 | 10 May 2019 | MGM Springfield, Springfield, Massachusetts, U.S. | |
| 15 | Win | 15–0 | Jesus Aviles | TKO | 4 (8), 1:57 | 9 Feb 2019 | Coliseo Mayor del Tena, Napo, Ecuador | |
| 14 | Win | 14–0 | Antonio Chaves Fernandez | RTD | 1 (8), 3:00 | 1 Dec 2018 | Skowhegan Community Center, Skowhegan, Maine, U.S. | |
| 13 | Win | 13–0 | Jaime Barboza | TKO | 3 (8), 1:46 | 8 Sep 2018 | Plainridge Park Casino, Plainville, Massachusetts, U.S. | |
| 12 | Win | 12–0 | Lenwood Dozier | TKO | 3 (6), 2:24 | 31 Mar 2018 | Marina Bay SportsPlex, Quincy, Massachusetts, U.S. | |
| 11 | Win | 11–0 | Derrick Findley | UD | 6 | 24 Feb 2018 | Mohegan Sun Casino, Uncasville, Connecticut, U.S. | |
| 10 | Win | 10–0 | Henry Beckford | UD | 8 | 30 Sep 2017 | House of Blues, Boston, Massachusetts, U.S. | |
| 9 | Win | 9–0 | Larry Smith | TKO | 5 (6), 2:59 | 5 Aug 2017 | Memorial Hall, Melrose, Massachusetts, U.S. | |
| 8 | Win | 8–0 | Melvin Betancourt | KO | 1 (6), 2:37 | 20 May 2017 | Memorial Hall, Melrose, Massachusetts, U.S. | |
| 7 | Win | 7–0 | Demetrius Walker | TKO | 1 (4), 1:09 | 13 May 2017 | Sands Casino Resort Bethlehem, Bethlehem, Pennsylvania, U.S. | |
| 6 | Win | 6–0 | Ronald Mixon | TKO | 1 (8), 1:16 | 23 Aug 2016 | Sands Casino Resort Bethlehem, Bethlehem, Pennsylvania, U.S. | |
| 5 | Win | 5–0 | Zachariah Kelley | TKO | 1 (6), 1:50 | 30 Apr 2016 | D.C. Armory, Washington, D.C., U.S. | |
| 4 | Win | 4–0 | Derrick Adkins | TKO | 4 (6), 1:58 | 16 Jan 2016 | Barclays Center, New York City, New York, U.S. | |
| 3 | Win | 3–0 | Michael Gbenga | UD | 6 | 22 Sep 2015 | Sands Casino Resort Bethlehem, Bethlehem, Pennsylvania, U.S. | |
| 2 | Win | 2–0 | Alvaro Enriquez | KO | 1 (4), 1:54 | 27 Jun 2015 | Sands Casino Resort Bethlehem, Bethlehem, Pennsylvania, U.S. | |
| 1 | Win | 1–0 | Efigenio Perez | KO | 1 (4), 1:12 | 22 May 2015 | Claridge Hotel and Casino, Atlantic City, New Jersey, U.S. | |
