= Ehsan Rouzbahani =

Iranian boxer

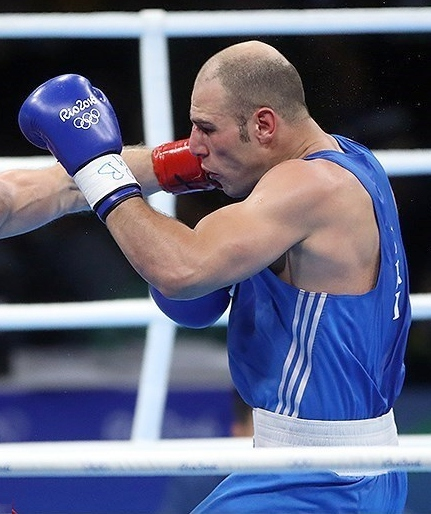
- Rouzbahani at the 2016 Olympics

Personal information
- Native name: احسان روزبهانی
- Nationality: Iranian
- Born: June 23, 1988 (age 38) Borujerd, Iran
- Height: 184 cm (6 ft 0 in)

Sport
- Sport: Boxing
- Event: Light heavyweight (−81 kg)
- Coached by: Akbar Ahadi
Medal record
Representing Iran
Asian Games
Bronze medal – third place	2014 Incheon	-81 kg
Asian Championships
Bronze medal – third place	2013 Amman	-81 kg

Ehsan Rouzbahani (Persian: احسان روزبهانی; born June 23, 1988) is an Iranian boxer who competed at the 2012 and 2016 Olympics at light heavyweight.

At the 2010 Asian Games he lost his second bout to Elshod Rasulov. At the 2011 World Amateur Boxing Championships he beat three fighters including Joe Ward then lost again to veteran Elshod Rasulov (UZB). He qualified for the 2012 Olympics.

At the 2012 Olympics he defeated Jeysson Monroy (COL) in his first bout. In the round of 16, he defeated number 6th seed, Bayram Muzaffer (TUR). The Iranian edged past the first round 5–4 and the Turkish boxer clinched the second round with a similar result. In the final round, Rouzbahani gained the upper hand and upped his work rate and Muzaffer could not cope with the sudden injection of pace. Rouzbahani lost in the quarterfinals to Adilbek Niyazymbetov of Kazakhstan, with a final score of 10–13.

In 2013 Rouzbahani competed in the World Series of Boxing.

== Personal life ==
On 26 January 2026, reacting to a video from the 2025–2026 Iranian protests of a father in Kahrizak searching for his the body of his son who was killed in the protests for 12 minutes, Rouzbahani wrote on his Instagram: "(His) father was looking for his son's body for 12 minutes, and then I became a corpse for another 12 minutes."
