= Imre Szellő =

Hungarian boxer (born 1983)

Personal information
- Nickname: Imo
- Nationality: Hungarian
- Born: July 27, 1983 (age 43) Cegléd, Hungary
- Height: 6 ft 1 in (1.85 m)
- Weight: Cruiserweight

Boxing career
- Reach: 75 in (191 cm)
- Stance: Orthodox

Boxing record
- Total fights: 25
- Wins: 24
- Win by KO: 16
- Losses: 1
Medal record
Men's boxing
Representing Hungary
European Amateur Championships
| Bronze medal – third place | 2011 Ankara | Light Heavyweight |
EU Championships
| Gold medal – first place | 2009 Odense | Light Heavyweight |
| Bronze medal – third place | 2008 Cetniewo | Light Heavyweight |

Imre Szellő (born July 27, 1983) is a Hungarian professional boxer who has qualified for the 2008 Olympics.

== Career ==
=== 2007 World Amateur Boxing Championships ===
At the 2007 World Amateur Boxing Championships in Chicago Szellő missed out on a bronze medal after he was defeated by Russia's Artur Beterbiev in the quarter finals, Beterbiev went on to win the silver medal. However Szellő qualified for the 2008 Olympics by virtue of getting to the quarter finals.

2007 (in Chicago)

- Defeated Lennon Bannis (Denmark) - walkover
- Defeated Matthew Corbett (Australia) - RSCR2 (10–1)
- Lost Artur Beterbiev (Russia) 9–25

=== 2008 Olympics ===
- KO Luis González
- Lost to Tony Jeffries 2:10 England

=== World Series of Boxing record ===
| 16 fights | 13 wins | 3 losses |
|---|---|---|
| By knockout | 1 | 0 |
| By decision | 12 | 3 |

| No. | Result | Record | Team | Opponent (Team) | Type | Round, time | Date | Location | Notes |
|---|---|---|---|---|---|---|---|---|---|
| 16 | Win | 13–3 | Milano Thunder | Johann Witt (Team Germany) | UD | 5 | 7 Feb 2014 | Frankfurt, Germany | |
| 15 | Win | 12–3 | Milano Thunder | (Sweden) Gabriel Richards (Argentina Condors) | UD | 5 | 18 Jan 2014 | Porto Torres, Italy | |
| 14 | Win | 11–3 | Milano Thunder | (Ukraine) Denys Solonenko (Ukrainian Otamans) | UD | 5 | 12 Apr 2013 | Campione d'Italia, Italy | |
| 13 | Win | 10–3 | Milano Thunder | (Sweden) Kennedy Katende (USA Knockouts) | UD | 5 | 1 Mar 2013 | Reno, United States | |
| 12 | Win | 9–3 | Milano Thunder | (Bosnia and Herzegovina) Džemal Bošnjak (USA Knockouts) | UD | 5 | 12 Jan 2013 | Assago, Italy | |
| 11 | Win | 8–3 | Milano Thunder | (Ukraine) Denys Poyatsyka (Ukrainian Otamans) | SD | 5 | 8 Dec 2012 | Assago, Italy | |
| 10 | Loss | 7–3 | Milano Thunder | (Republic of Ireland) Joe Ward (British Lionhearts) | UD | 5 | 23 Nov 2012 | Newport, United Kingdom | |
| 9 | Loss | 7–2 | Milano Thunder | (Ukraine) Oleksandr Gvozdyk (Dynamo Moscow) | PTS | 5 | 2 May 2012 | London, United Kingdom | WSB Season 2 Team Final |
| 8 | Win | 7–1 | Milano Thunder | (Azerbaijan) Vatan Huseynli (Baku Fires) | PTS | 5 | 24 Mar 2012 | Assago, Italy | |
| 7 | Win | 6–1 | Milano Thunder | (France) Nicolas Dion (Paris United) | PTS | 5 | 9 Mar 2012 | Assago, Italy | |
| 6 | Win | 5–1 | Milano Thunder | (Greece) Ioannis Militopoulos (Bangkok Elephants) | PTS | 5 | 10 Feb 2012 | Assago, Italy | |
| 5 | Win | 4–1 | Memphis Force | Francisco Ortega (Mexico City Guerreros) | KO | 2 (5) | 16 Mar 2011 | Mexico City, Mexico | |
| 4 | Win | 3–1 | Memphis Force | (United States) Siju Shabazz (Miami Gallos) | PTS | 5 | 3 Mar 2011 | Memphis, United States | |
| 3 | Win | 2–1 | Memphis Force | (Brazil) Elber Passos (Los Angeles Matadors) | WO | - | 18 Feb 2011 | Southaven, United States | |
| 2 | Loss | 1–1 | Memphis Force | (Sweden) Kennedy Katende (Mexico City Guerreros) | PTS | 5 | 15 Jan 2011 | Southaven, United States | |
| 1 | Win | 1–0 | Memphis Force | (United States) Siju Shabazz (Miami Gallos) | PTS | 5 | 26 Nov 2010 | Southaven, United States | WSB debut |

== Professional record ==
25 fights, 24 wins (16 knockouts), 1 losses (1 knockouts), 0 draw
| No. | Result | Record | Opponent | Type | Round, time | Date | Location | Notes |
| 25 | Loss | 24-1 | (Belgium) Ryad Merhy | KO | 7 (12), 2:10 | 2019-10-19 | (Belgium) RTL Spiroudome, Charleroi | For WBA Interim Cruiserweight title |
| 24 | Win | 24-0 | (Argentina) Juan Ezequiel Basualdo | TKO | 2 (8), 1:22 | 2019-06-01 | (Hungary) Gál Gyula Sportcsarnok, Várpalota | |
| 23 | Win | 23-0 | (Slovenia) Denis Simčič | KO | 2 (8), 2:59 | 2019-02-22 | (Hungary) Budakalász Sporthall, Budakalász | |
| 22 | Win | 22-0 | (Venezuela) Gusmyr Perdomo | TKO | 7 (8), 2:53 | 2018-10-12 | (Hungary) Salgótarján Sporthall, Salgótarján | |
| 21 | Win | 21-0 | (Venezuela) Williams Ocando | KO | 2 (10), 2:50 | 2018-05-11 | (Hungary) Dr. Papp László Sporthall, Szentes | |
| 20 | Win | 20-0 | (Russia) Denis Grachev | UD | 10 | 2018-02-16 | (Hungary) Budakalász Sporthall, Budakalász | |
| 19 | Win | 19-0 | (United States) Robert Hall Jr | KO | 9 (10), 1:45 | 2017-11-10 | (Hungary) Salgótarján Sporthall, Salgótarján | Retained WBO Inter-Continental Cruiserweight title |
| 18 | Win | 18-0 | (Croatia) Petar Mrvalj | KO | 2 (6), 1:40 | 2017-09-15 | (Hungary) Castle of Várpalota, Várpalota | |
| 17 | Win | 17-0 | (Hungary) Tamás Tóth | TKO | 5 (12) | 2017-04-22 | (Hungary) Lakeside Hotel, Székesfehérvár | Retained WBO Inter-Continental Cruiserweight title |
| 16 | Win | 16-0 | (United States) Garrett Wilson | UD | 8 | 2017-02-18 | (Hungary) Petőfi Sándor Gymnasium, Pápa | |
| 15 | Win | 15-0 | (Bosnia and Herzegovina) Dražan Janjanin | TKO | 7 (8) | 2016-12-17 | (Hungary) Budakalász Sporthall, Budakalász | |
| 14 | Win | 14-0 | (Brazil) Hamilton Ventura | UD | 10 | 2016-09-17 | (Hungary) Castle of Várpalota, Várpalota | Won vacant WBO Inter-Continental Cruiserweight title |
| 13 | Win | 13-0 | (Uganda) Hamza Wandera | KO | 4 (10), 1:13 | 2016-05-21 | (Hungary) Gál József Sporthall, Cegléd | |
| 12 | Win | 12-0 | (Brazil) Carlos Ailton Nascimento | UD | 10 | 2016-04-16 | (Hungary) Millenáris Theater, Budapest | |
| 11 | Win | 11-0 | (Argentina) Walter David Cabral | KO | 2 (10), 2:57 | 2016-02-20 | (Hungary) Salgótarján Sporthall, Salgótarján | |
| 10 | Win | 10-0 | (Tanzania) Said Mbelwa | KO | 3 (10), 2:20 | 2015-12-12 | (Hungary) Dunaújváros Sporthall, Dunaújváros | |
| 9 | Win | 9-0 | (Argentina) Alejandro Emilio Valori | TKO | 5 (10), 2:50 | 2015-10-17 | (Hungary) Millenáris Theater, Budapest | |
| 8 | Win | 8-0 | (Belgium) Ismail Abdoul | UD | 6 | 2015-09-19 | (Hungary) Dr. Papp László Sporthall, Szentes | |
| 7 | Win | 7-0 | (Cuba) Miguel Velozo | TKO | 6 (8), 1:02 | 2015-05-22 | (Hungary) Messzi István Sporthall, Kecskemét | |
| 6 | Win | 6-0 | (Romania) Giulian Ilie | UD | 8 | 2015-04-17 | (Hungary) Budakalász Sporthall, Budakalász | |
| 5 | Win | 5-0 | (Georgia (country)) Shalva Jomardashvili | TKO | 3 (10), 0:36 | 2015-03-14 | (Hungary) Gál József Sporthall, Cegléd | Won vacant UBO International Cruiserweight title |
| 4 | Win | 4-0 | (Slovakia) Vladimír Idrányi | KO | 5 (6), 1:38 | 2014-12-06 | (Hungary) Gál József Sporthall, Cegléd | |
| 3 | Win | 3-0 | (Georgia (country)) Giorgi Tevdorashvili | TKO | 3 (8) | 2014-11-15 | (Hungary) Földi Imre Sporthall, Tatabánya | |
| 2 | Win | 2-0 | (Hungary) Gyula Bozai | UD | 10 | 2014-09-20 | (Hungary) Dr. Papp László Sporthall, Szentes | Won Hungary Cruiserweight title |
| 1 | Win | 1-0 | (Georgia (country)) Paata Berikashvili | UD | 6 | 2014-06-06 | (Hungary) Dr. Papp László Sporthall, Szentes | |
