= Oleksandr Gvozdyk =

Ukrainian boxer (born 1987)

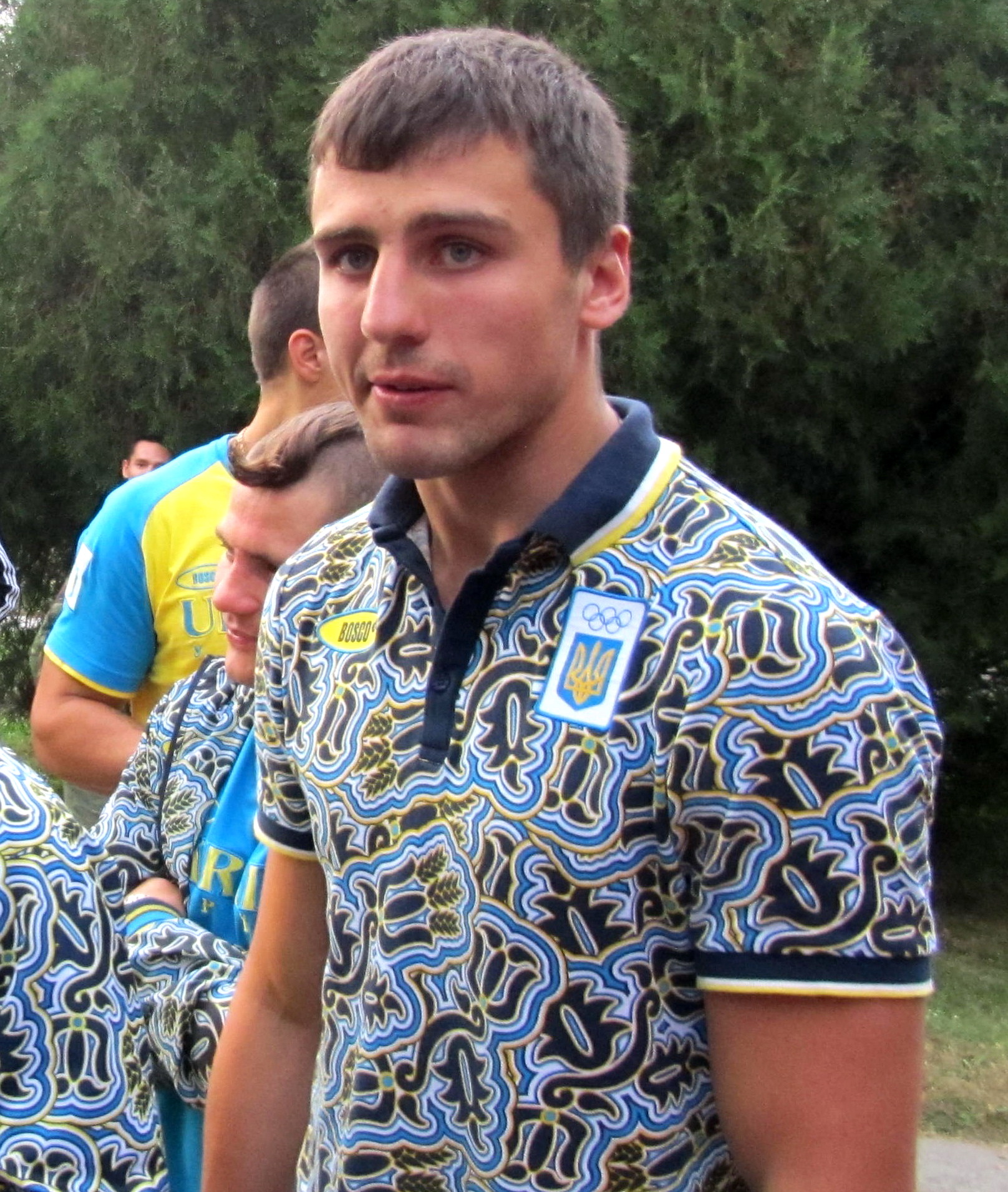
- Gvozdyk in 2012

Personal information
- Native name: Олександр Гвоздик
- Nickname: The Nail
- Nationality: Ukrainian
- Born: Oleksandr Serhiyovych Gvozdyk; 15 April 1987 (age 39) Kharkiv, Ukrainian SSR, Soviet Union
- Height: 1.88 m (6 ft 2 in)
- Weight: Light-heavyweight; Cruiserweight

Boxing career
- Reach: 192 cm (75.5 in)
- Stance: Orthodox

Boxing record
- Total fights: 24
- Wins: 21
- Win by KO: 17
- Losses: 3
Medal record
Men's amateur boxing
Representing Ukraine
Olympic Games
Bronze medal – third place	2012 London	Light-heavyweight
World University Championships
Gold medal – first place	2008 Kazan	Light-heavyweight
Summer Universiade
Gold medal – first place	2013 Kazan	Light-heavyweight

Oleksandr Serhiyovych Gvozdyk (also Hvozdyk; Ukrainian: Олександр Сергійович Гвоздик [olekˈsɑndr serˈɦijowɪdʒ ˈɦwɔzdɪk]; born 15 April 1987) is a Ukrainian professional boxer. He held the WBC and lineal light-heavyweight titles from 2018 to 2019. As an amateur, Gvozdyk won a bronze medal at the 2012 Olympics and a gold at the 2013 Summer Universiade.

Gvozdyk has stated he is nicknamed "The Nail" because his surname in Russian translates to 'nail'. He is considered part of the Ukrainian golden generation of boxing along with other 2012 Olympic medallists Denys Berinchyk, Vasiliy Lomachenko, Taras Shelestyuk, and Oleksandr Usyk.

== Amateur career ==
Gvozdyk was introduced to boxing at the age of 8, when his father, an amateur boxer, gave him a set of boxing gloves. Prior to this, Gvozdyk was more interested in kickboxing and karate. He also received the encouragement of his friends to begin boxing. As an amateur, he won gold in the light-heavyweight division at the 2008 World University Boxing Championship. He was a three-time national Ukrainian amateur champion, winning the title for the first time in 2009, beating Vyacheslav Shabranskyy in the final. He won the national title again in 2010, against Ivan Senay, and 2011, against Dmytro Bulgakov.

At the 2009 World Amateur Boxing Championships, Gvozdyk beat two opponents before being edged out by German boxer Rene Krause. He was eliminated in the preliminary bouts at the 2010 European Amateur Boxing Championships by Ainar Karlson of Estonia. Gvozdyk won the EUBC Europe Cup in 2011, defeating Karlson by stoppage in the final.

At the 2011 World Amateur Boxing Championships Gvozdyk beat three fighters before falling to the 2009 world champion Egor Mekhontsev of Russia. By reaching the quarterfinals, Gvozdyk qualified for the 2012 Summer Olympics. He was a bronze medallist at the 2012 Summer Olympics. He defeated Belarusian Mikhail Dauhaliavets 18–10, Nicaraguan Osmar Bravo 18–6, and Algerian Abdelhafid Benchabla 19–17 before losing controversially to Kazakh Adilbek Niyazymbetov on countback in the semifinals.

Gvozdyk participated in the World Series of Boxing between 2011 and 2013, winning 9 bouts and losing none. Gvozdyk rounded out his amateur career by winning gold at the 2013 Summer Universiade. He won by walkover in the final as Dmitry Bivol injured his hand in the semi-final and could not compete. Gvozdyk's exact amateur record is unknown, but he has said he had around 255 bouts and lost 30 of which, so he finished with a record of about 225–30.

== Professional career ==
=== Rise up the ranks ===
Gvozdyk turned professional in 2014, signing with Top Rank. He won his debut, defeating Mike Montoya (5–2–1) via first-round KO on the undercard of Manny Pacquiao vs. Timothy Bradley II on 12 April 2014. In 2016, Gvozdyk challenged for the NABF light-heavyweight title against former world title challenger Nadjib Mohammedi (37–4), on the undercard of Manny Pacquiao vs. Timothy Bradley III. Gvozdyk dropped Mohammedi in the second round with a right hook. Mohammedi fell face first on the canvas and the referee waved the fight immediately, giving Gvozdyk his tenth straight win and his first professional title.

Gvozdyk made his first title defence against three-time world-title challenger Tommy Karpency (26–5–1) on 23 July 2016. After Karpency dropped Gvozdyk in the first round with an inside shot, Gvozdyk rallied and knocked Karpency out in the sixth round with a hook to the body. He then faced off against Isaac Chilemba (24–4–2) on 19 November 2016, on the undercard of Sergey Kovalev vs. Andre Ward. Gvozdyk started strong after Chilemba suffered an injury to his right hand. Chilemba started to increase the pace, but decided to retire at the end of the eight round due to his hand injury, giving Gvozdyk the win.

On 8 April 2017, Gvozdyk won a second regional title, claiming the NABO title with a round 3 TKO win over Yunieski Gonzalez (18–2). Later that year, the WBC ordered a world title eliminator between Gvozdyk and Marcus Browne, but Browne declined the fight. On 19 August, Gvozdyk defeated Craig Baker (17–1) by a 6th-round knockout on the undercard of Terence Crawford vs. Julius Indongo at the Pinnacle Bank Arena in Lincoln, Nebraska. Baker was coming off a year-long layoff to take the fight with Gvozdyk.

Gvozdyk won the WBC interim light-heavyweight title by dominating a 12-round bout on 17 March 2018 against former European light-heavyweight champion Mehdi Amar (34–5–2), and put himself in position to challenge Adonis Stevenson for the full WBC title. According to CompuBox, Gvozdyk landed 256 of 960 (27%) total punches, including 176 of 492 (36%) of his power shots. Amar landed 135 of 536 (25%) of his total shots, including 92 of 337 (27%) power shots.

=== WBC and lineal champion ===
On 1 December 2018, Gvozdyk knocked out Adonis Stevenson (29–2–1, 24 KOs) at 2:49 of the 11th round to win the WBC and lineal championship, ending a reign that began in 2013. Gvozdyk knocked Stevenson down in the third round, but the referee called it as a slip. Stevenson hurt Gvozdyk with a few strong shots in the 9th and 10th rounds, particularly a left hand in the 10th which almost dropped Gvozdyk. But Gvozdyk rallied and after a 10-punch combination finished with a straight right he put Stevenson down hard in the 11th round. The referee waved the fight without a count as Stevenson was clearly unconscious. Stevenson was hospitalised after the bout with a life-threatening brain injury, and was put in an induced coma for three weeks. Gvozdyk said he did not want to be "known as a killer" and wished Stevenson a strong recovery.

On 30 March 2019, Gvozdyk faced Doudou Ngumbu (38–8, 14 KOs) in his first defense of his WBC and lineal titles. Gvozdyk started the bout as the aggressor by peppering Ngumbu with short right and left hands, before landing a punishing overhand right. By the third round, Gvozdyk appeared to be in a rhythm, as he connected on a straight right hand followed by a left hook. Ngumbu fought back, firing off a hard combination of his own to the body. Near the end of the fourth round, Gvozdyk upped the work rate on his jab to set up a three-punch combination. Early In the fifth round, Ngumbu suffered a right calf injury. Despite the injury not being the result of a foul, the referee gave Ngumbu five minutes to try to recover. Ngumbu tried to walk around the ring, but continued to have a limp, and the bout was called off as a TKO victory for Gvozdyk.

=== Unification fight vs. Beterbiev, retirement ===
After the Ngumbu bout, Top Rank set to work on a unification fight between Gvozdyk and IBF light-heavyweight champion Artur Beterbiev (14–0, 14 KOs) for some time in Autumn 2019 on ESPN. The winner of Gvozdyk vs. Beterbiev would hold two of the four world titles at 175, and set up further unification matches. Beterbiev, a two-time Russian Olympian, had arguably been avoided by the other top fighters in the 175-pound division due to being a fearsome opponent who did not have name recognition among most fans. In July it was announced that the fight would take place on 18 October, at the Liacouras Center in Philadelphia.

The fight was competitive, with Gvozdyk's accurate punching countering Beterbiev's pressure, but Gvozdyk began to fade as the fight went on. In the 9th round, Beterbiev took control of the fight, and had Gvozdyk struggling to stay on his feet. Gvozdyk survived the round but was visibly fatigued coming into the 10th. Beterbiev applied the pressure in the 10th and Gvozdyk took a knee early in the round. He got up but soon went down again after another flurry from Beterbiev, and the referee warned that another knockdown would mean the end of the fight. After another exchange where Beterbiev came out on top, Gvozdyk took a knee once more, resulting in a TKO victory for Beterbiev. Gvozdyk was leading on the scorecards at the time of stoppage, with two judges seeing the fight 87–83, 86–85 for Gvozdyk, and one judge seeing it 83–87 for Beterbiev. CompuBox showed Beterbiev was busier and sharper, landing 161 of 515 punches thrown (31%) and Gvozdyk landed with 118 of 614 thrown (19%). Both boxers were guaranteed a $1.5 million purse for their efforts. The fight averaged of 635,000 viewers.

After the bout, Gvozdyk was hospitalised due to a pain in the back of his head. It was feared that he had suffered a brain bleed, but testing revealed it was only a mild concussion due to the strikes to the back of the head he experienced during the fight. He was released from hospital after two days.

Eight months afterwards, Gvozdyk retired from professional boxing. He stated in 2024 that there was a perception he retired due to the loss to Beterbiev, but stated that his decision to retire was instead due to the COVID-19 pandemic inhibiting his ability to have a training camp. He also stated he had business and investment opportunities in Ukraine, so he did not need to box any longer. The war in Ukraine disrupted his business activities and around the same time he was contacted by Canelo Álvarez to be a sparring partner in the lead up to Canelo's fight against Dmitry Bivol in May 2022. During the training camp with Canelo, Gvozdyk realised his boxing ability had not diminished much, so he decided to make a comeback to competition.

=== Return from retirement ===
In late 2022, Gvozdyk announced that he would be returning to competition. In his first fight back he faced Mexican journeyman Josue Obando (20–34–2, 15 KOs) on 11 February 2023 in Pomona, California in a cruiserweight bout. Gvozdyk had a measured performance, notching a clear unanimous decision. All three judges scored the bout 60–54 for Gvozdyk.

In a quick step up from his first fight back Gvozdyk fought WBC #4 ranked contender Ričards Bolotņiks (19–6–1, 8 KOs) back at his normal weightclass of light-heavyweight. This fight was put on the undercard of Canelo Álvarez vs. John Ryder on 6 May 2023. Gvozdyk had a listless start to the fight, landing mostly ineffectively in the first 5 rounds of the fight. Midway through the sixth round, Gvozdyk found a clean left hook that dropped Bolotniks, who returned to his feet but was deemed unfit to continue fighting by the referee.

==== Gvozdyk vs. Benavidez ====
Gvozdyk challenged David Benavidez (28–0, 24 KOs) for the interim WBC light-heavyweight title at MGM Grand Garden Arena in Las Vegas on 15 June 2024. Gvozdyk lost via unanimous decision, with scores of 119–109, 117–111, and 116–112 for Benavidez.

==== Gvozdyk vs. Kalajdzic ====
On 1 February 2026, Gvozdyk fought Radivoje Kalajdzic at Meta Apex in Enterprise, Nevada, USA. Despite sending his opponent to the canvas in rounds one and four, he lost by knockout in the seventh round.

== Personal life ==
Gvozdyk was born in Kharkiv, then part of the Ukrainian SSR in the Soviet Union, as an only child. His father was an amateur boxer.

Gvozdyk is married and has three children, two sons and a daughter. As of 2017, he lived and trained in Oxnard, California. He stated in 2019 that he speaks Ukrainian and Russian fluently, and has proficiency in English. He added that, "In Ukraine, one half of people speak Ukrainian and one half, in eastern part, speak Russian. I am from eastern part and speak Russian when I’m in Ukraine. Officially, in my passport, I’m Oleksandr – with ‘o’ – but speaking, I’m Alexander." He said in a 2024 interview that he never had problems with the Russians he knew in Kharkiv, and said the Russian invasion of Ukraine in 2022 felt "like a betrayal." After the war began, Gvozdyk invited his father to live with him in California, but his father ultimately decided to return to Kharkiv.

== Professional boxing record ==
24 fights	21 wins	3 losses
By knockout	17	2
By decision	4	1

No.	Result	Record	Opponent	Type	Round, time	Date	Location	Notes
24	Loss	21–3	Radivoje Kalajdzic	KO	7 (10), 2:47	1 Feb 2026	Meta Apex, Enterprise, Nevada, U.S.	
23	Win	21–2	Anthony Holloway	TKO	3 (8), 1:38	19 Apr 2025	Frontwave Arena, Oceanside, California, U.S.	
22	Loss	20–2	David Benavidez	UD	12	15 Jun 2024	MGM Grand Garden Arena, Paradise, Nevada, US	For vacant WBC interim light heavyweight title
21	Win	20–1	Isaac Rodrigues	KO	2 (8), 0:54	30 Sep 2023	T-Mobile Arena, Las Vegas, US	
20	Win	19–1	Ričards Bolotņiks	TKO	6 (10), 1:56	6 May 2023	Estadio Akron, Zapopan, Mexico	
19	Win	18–1	Josue Obando	UD	6	11 Feb 2023	The Derby Room Pomona at Fairplex, Pomona, California, US	
18	Loss	17–1	Artur Beterbiev	TKO	10 (12), 2:49	18 Oct 2019	Liacouras Center, Philadelphia, Pennsylvania, US	Lost WBC light-heavyweight title; For IBF light-heavyweight title
17	Win	17–0	Doudou Ngumbu	TKO	5 (12), 0:58	30 Mar 2019	2300 Arena, Philadelphia, Pennsylvania, US	Retained WBC light-heavyweight title
16	Win	16–0	Adonis Stevenson	KO	11 (12), 2:49	1 Dec 2018	Videotron Centre, Montreal, Quebec, Canada	Won WBC light-heavyweight title
15	Win	15–0	Mehdi Amar	UD	12	17 Mar 2018	The Theater at Madison Square Garden, New York City, New York, US	Won vacant WBC interim light-heavyweight title
14	Win	14–0	Craig Baker	TKO	6 (10), 2:04	19 Aug 2017	Pinnacle Bank Arena, Lincoln, Nebraska, US	Retained WBC-NABF and WBO–NABO light-heavyweight titles
13	Win	13–0	Yunieski Gonzalez	TKO	3 (10), 2:55	8 Apr 2017	MGM National Harbor, Oxon Hill, Maryland, US	Retained WBC-NABF light-heavyweight title; Won vacant WBO–NABO light-heavyweight title
12	Win	12–0	Isaac Chilemba	RTD	8 (10), 3:00	19 Nov 2016	T-Mobile Arena, Paradise, Nevada, US	Retained WBC-NABF light-heavyweight title
11	Win	11–0	Tommy Karpency	KO	6 (10), 2:21	23 Jul 2016	MGM Grand Garden Arena, Paradise, Nevada, US	Retained WBC-NABF light-heavyweight title
10	Win	10–0	Nadjib Mohammedi	KO	2 (10), 2:06	9 Apr 2016	MGM Grand Garden Arena, Paradise, Nevada, US	Won vacant WBC-NABF light-heavyweight title
9	Win	9–0	Mike Snider	KO	1 (8), 2:58	13 Feb 2016	Sportsmen's Lodge, Studio City, California, US	
8	Win	8–0	Cleiton Conceição	TKO	3 (8), 0:50	20 Nov 2015	Cosmopolitan of Las Vegas, Paradise, Nevada, US	
7	Win	7–0	Francisco Sierra	RTD	5 (8), 3:00	19 Sep 2015	Sportsmen's Lodge, Studio City, California, US	
6	Win	6–0	Michael Gbenga	UD	6	13 Jun 2015	Florentine Gardens, Los Angeles, California, US	
5	Win	5–0	Cory Cummings	KO	2 (8), 1:10	24 Jan 2015	1stBank Center, Broomfield, Colorado, US	
4	Win	4–0	Otis Griffin	TKO	6 (8), 1:51	15 Nov 2014	Alamodome, San Antonio, Texas, US	
3	Win	3–0	Lamont Williams	KO	5 (6), 1:38	20 Sep 2014	Celebrity Theatre, Phoenix, Arizona, US	
2	Win	2–0	Michael Gbenga	UD	6	17 May 2014	Selland Arena, Fresno, California, US	
1	Win	1–0	Mike Montoya	KO	1 (6), 2:55	12 Apr 2014	MGM Grand Garden Arena, Paradise, Nevada, US	

Sporting positions
Regional boxing titles
Vacant Title last held by Isaac Chilemba	WBC-NABF light-heavyweight champion 9 April 2016 – March 2018; Vacated	Vacant Title next held by Alfonso Lopez III
Vacant Title last held by Sean Monaghan	WBO–NABO light-heavyweight champion 8 April 2017 – March 2018; Vacated	Vacant Title next held by Gilbert Lenin Castillo
World boxing titles
Vacant Title last held by Chad Dawson	WBC light-heavyweight champion Interim title 18 March 2018 – 1 December 2018; Won full title	Vacant
Preceded by Adonis Stevenson	WBC light-heavyweight champion 1 December 2018 – October 18, 2019	Succeeded by Artur Beterbiev
