= Boxing at the 2011 Pan American Games – Light heavyweight =

Men's light heavyweight at the 2011 Pan American Games
- Venue: Expo Guadalajara Arena
- Dates: October 24 – 29
- Competitors: 6 from 6 nations

Medalists
Gold medal	Julio La Cruz	Cuba
Silver medal	Yamaguchi Falcão	Brazil
Bronze medal	Carlos Gongora	Ecuador
Bronze medal	Armando Pina	Mexico

The men's light heavyweight competition of the boxing events at the 2011 Pan American Games in Guadalajara, Mexico, was held between October 24 and 29 at the Expo Guadalajara Arena. Light heavyweights were limited to those boxers weighing less than or equal to 81 kilograms.

Like all Pan American boxing events, the competition was a straight single-elimination tournament. Both semifinal losers were awarded bronze medals, so no boxers competed again after their first loss. Bouts consisted of four rounds of two minutes each, with one-minute breaks between rounds. Punches scored only if the white area on the front of the glove made full contact with the front of the head or torso of the opponent. Five judges scored each bout; three of the judges had to signal a scoring punch within one second for the punch to score. The winner of the bout was the boxer who scored the most valid punches by the end of the bout.

== Schedule ==
All times are Central Standard Time (UTC-6).

Date	Time	Round
October 24, 2011	18:00	Quarterfinals
October 26, 2011	19:00	Semifinals
October 29, 2011	19:00	Final

== Results ==
=== Bracket ===
Quarterfinals		Semifinals		Finals
		Carlos Gongora (ECU)	9
Jeffrey Spencer (USA)	2	Julio La Cruz (CUB)	19
Julio La Cruz (CUB)	19			Julio La Cruz (CUB)	22
Yamaguchi Falcão (BRA)	DSQ			Yamaguchi Falcão (BRA)	12
Felix Varela (DOM)		Yamaguchi Falcão (BRA)	27
		Armando Pina (MEX)	11
