= Boxing at the 2010 South American Games – Men's 81kg =

The Men's 81 kg event at the 2010 South American Games had its semifinals held on March 24 and the final on March 28.

== Medalists ==
Gold	Silver	Bronze
Carlos Góngora; Ecuador	Roaner Angulo; Colombia	Yamil Peralta; Argentina; Washington Silva; Brazil

== Results ==
Semifinals
1	Washington Silva (BRA)	0
4	Roaner Angulo (COL)	2
3	Yamil Peralta (ARG)
2	Carlos Góngora (ECU)	RSC

Final
Roaner Angulo (COL)	1
Carlos Góngora (ECU)	9
