= Lenin Castillo =

Dominican Republic boxer (born 1988)

Personal information
- Nickname: Lenin
- Nationality: Dominican
- Born: Gilbert Lenin Castillo Rivera; August 21, 1988 (age 38) Katanga, Los Minas, Dominican Republic
- Weight: Light heavyweight

Boxing career
- Stance: Orthodox

Boxing record
- Total fights: 32
- Wins: 24
- Win by KO: 19
- Losses: 7
- Draws: 1

Gilbert Lenin Castillo Rivera (born August 21, 1988) is a Dominican professional boxer who competed at the 2008 Summer Olympics.

== Early and personal life ==
Castillo was born on August 21, 1988, in Santo Domingo. He boxed for the Julito López Club in Los Mina trained by Papito Pujols.

== Amateur career ==
In 2006, Castillo won the gold medal at the Junior Pan American Championships and the gold in the Romana Cup. In 2007 he won the bronze in the ALBA Games, silver in the Romana Cup, bronze in the Dominican Independence Cup.

Castillo qualified to the 2008 Olympic Games in Guatemala in April 2008, and in May he won the gold medal at the Cheo Aponte Cup in Caguas, Puerto Rico. He competed at the Olympic welterweight category in Beijing, China, but lost his first fight to Olexandr Stretskyy 6:9. He also went to the 2009 American Continental Championships, earning the bronze medal. He also participated at the 2009 World Championships in Milan, Italy in the light heavyweight category losing in the round of 16 to Uzbekistani Elshod Rasulov 11–1.

== Professional career ==
In April 2012, Castillo signed for the boxing promoter Acquinity Sports along with compatriots Manuel Félix Díaz and Argenis Mendez. One month later, in May he won by unanimous decision to the Mexican Alvaro Enriquez to improve his record to (5–0–0) in a fight held at the Seminole Hard Rock Hotel and Casino in Hollywood, Florida, United States. In July, he knocked out the Mexican Ricardo Campillo in the second round in a Light Heavyweight category combat held in Hollywood, Florida, improving his record to 7–0. In Santo Domingo, in October, he knocked out compatriot Emilio Cayetano who did not come out for the 5th round, resulting in the fifth TKO and eighth victory for Castillo. After compiling a record of 15–0–1, Castillo suffered his first professional defeat to Joseph Williams, who won their fight by a majority decision. After fighting six more times, with a record of 5-1 (the loss coming to Marcus Browne), Castillo challenged Dmitry Bivol for his WBA (Super) light-heavyweight title on October 12, 2019. He lost by a unanimous decision. On September 25, 2021, Castillo suffered a brutal knockout loss to Callum Smith, on the undercard of Anthony Joshua's world heavyweight title defence against Oleksandr Usyk. He hit the canvas after taking a right hook to the chin from Smith and his legs began to shake uncontrollably. He was hospitalised after suffering a seizure, but was later released.
