= Boxing at the 2012 Summer Olympics – Men's light heavyweight =

Boxing competitions

Men's light heavyweight boxing at the Games of the XXX Olympiad
- Venue: ExCeL Exhibition Centre
- Date: 30 July to 12 August 2012
- Competitors: 26 from 26 nations

Medalists
1st place, gold medalist(s)		Egor Mekhontsev	Russia
2nd place, silver medalist(s)		Adilbek Niyazymbetov	Kazakhstan
3rd place, bronze medalist(s)		Yamaguchi Falcão	Brazil
3rd place, bronze medalist(s)		Oleksandr Gvozdyk	Ukraine

The men's light heavyweight boxing competition at the 2012 Olympic Games in London was held from 30 July to 12 August at the ExCeL Exhibition Centre.

Twenty-six boxers from 26 nations competed.

== Competition format ==
The competition consisted of a single-elimination tournament. Bronze medals were awarded to both semi-final losers. Bouts were three rounds of three minutes each.

== Schedule ==
All times are British Summer Time (UTC+1)

Date	Time	Round
Monday 30 July 2012	14:45 & 21:45	Round of 32
Saturday 4 August 2012	15:30 & 22:30	Round of 16
Wednesday 8 August 2012	22:30	Quarter-finals
Friday 10 August 2012	22:00	Semi-finals
Sunday 12 August 2012	14:45	Final

== Results ==
=== Finals ===
Semi-finals
Yamaguchi Falcão (BRA)	11
Egor Mekhontsev (RUS)	23
Adilbek Niyazymbetov (KAZ)	13
Oleksandr Gvozdyk (UKR)	13

Final
Egor Mekhontsev (RUS)	15
Adilbek Niyazymbetov (KAZ)	15

=== Top half ===
Round of 32
Ihab Al-Matbouli (JOR)	19
Lukman Lawal (NGR)	7
Sumit Sangwan (IND)	14
Yamaguchi Falcão (BRA)	15
Ahmed Barki (MAR)	8
Meng Fanlong (CHN)	17
Yahia El-Mekachari (TUN)	16
Jahon Qurbonov (TJK)	8
Damien Hooper (AUS)	13
Marcus Browne (USA)	11

Round of 16
Julio César la Cruz (CUB)	25
Ihab Al-Matbouli (JOR)	8
Yamaguchi Falcão (BRA)	17
Meng Fanlong (CHN)	17
Elshod Rasulov (UZB)	13
Yahia El-Mekachari (TUN)	6
Damien Hooper (AUS)	11
Egor Mekhontsev (RUS)	19

Quarter-finals
Julio César la Cruz (CUB)	15
Yamaguchi Falcão (BRA)	18
Elshod Rasulov (UZB)	15
Egor Mekhontsev (RUS)	19

Semi-finals
Yamaguchi Falcão (BRA)	11
Egor Mekhontsev (RUS)	23

=== Bottom half ===
Round of 32
Carlos Góngora (ECU)	9
Vatan Huseynli (AZE)	8
Jeysson Monroy (COL)	10
Ehsan Rouzbahani (IRI)	12
Oleksandr Hvozdyk (UKR)	18
Mikhail Dauhaliavets (BLR)	10
Boško Drašković (MNE)	11
Osmar Bravo (NCA)	16
Christian Donfack Adjoufack (CMR)	6
Enrico Kölling (GER)	15

Round of 16
Adilbek Niyazymbetov (KAZ)	13
Carlos Góngora (ECU)	5
Ehsan Rouzbahani (IRI)	18
Bahram Muzaffer (TUR)	12
Oleksandr Hvozdyk (UKR)	18
Osmar Bravo (NCA)	6
Enrico Kölling (GER)	9
Abdelhafid Benchabla (ALG)	12

Quarter-finals
Adilbek Niyazymbetov (KAZ)	13
Ehsan Rouzbahani (IRI)	10
Oleksandr Hvozdyk (UKR)	19
Abdelhafid Benchabla (ALG)	17

Semi-finals
Adilbek Niyazymbetov (KAZ)	13
Oleksandr Hvozdyk (UKR)	13

== Controversy ==
India's Sumit Sangwan fought well against Brazil's Yamaguchi Falcão before losing the bout 14–15 in what appeared to be a controversial decision in favour of the Brazilian. The decision not only angered the Indian team and the country's sports minister, Ajay Maken, but also led to an official protest which Maken confirmed on Twitter. Some commentators were also surprised by the decision, one describing it as "day-light robbery."
