= Joe Ward (boxer) =

Irish boxer (born 30 October 1993)

Personal information
- Nationality: Irish
- Born: Joseph Ward; 30 October 1993 (age 33) Moate, Westmeath, Ireland
- Height: 6 ft 1 in (1.86 m)
- Weight: Light-Heavyweight

Boxing career
- Stance: Southpaw

Boxing record
- Total fights: 8
- Wins: 7
- Win by KO: 4
- Losses: 1
Medal record
Men's amateur boxing
Representing Ireland
World Championships
Silver medal – second place	2017 Hamburg	Light-heavyweight
Silver medal – second place	2015 Doha	Light-heavyweight
Bronze medal – third place	2013 Almaty	Light-heavyweight
European Championships
Gold medal – first place	2017 Kharkiv	Light-heavyweight
Gold medal – first place	2015 Samokov	Light-heavyweight
Gold medal – first place	2011 Ankara	Light-heavyweight
Youth World Championships
Gold medal – first place	2010 Baku	Middleweight
Junior World Championships
Gold medal – first place	2009 Yerevan	Light-middleweight
European Junior Championships
Bronze medal – third place	2008 Plovdiv	63kg
European Schoolboys Championships
Silver medal – second place	2007 Portsmouth	56kg

Joseph Ward (born 30 October 1993) is an Irish professional boxer. As an amateur, he won gold medals at the 2011, 2015 and 2017 European Championships, silver at the 2015 and 2017 World Championships and bronze at the 2013 edition, and represented Ireland at the 2016 Olympics, in the light-heavyweight division

== Amateur career ==
=== 2007 European Schoolboys Championships ===
Ward won his first major international medal, a 56 kg silver, at the 2007 European Schoolboys Championships in Portsmouth, England.

Results:

- (Turkey) T.Dogan: Won - PTS (17:2)
- (Russia) Islam Khalidov: Lost - PTS (1:6)

=== 2008 European Junior Championships ===
Ward followed up this continental medal with a 63 kg bronze in the Junior age group at the championships in Plovdiv, Bulgaria.

Results:

- (Italy) Donato Cosenza: Won - PTS (17:2)
- (Belarus) Kiril Samodurov: Won - PTS (19:3)
- (Romania) Vasile Bucur: Won - RSC (2nd round)
- (Russia) Avak Uzlyan: Lost - PTS (6-20)

=== 2009 World Junior Championships ===
Ward won his first major gold medal in 2009, at the World Junior Championships in Yerevan, Armenia. Ward defeated Armenian fighter Hayk Khachatryan in the light-middleweight final.

Results:

- (Kazakhstan) Denis Rybak: Won - RSC (3rd round)
- (Russia) Rustam Musaadzhiyev: Won - RSC (2nd round)
- (Uzbekistan) Ravshanjon Abdunazarov: Won - PTS (12:2)
- (Armenia) Hayk Khachatryan: Won - RSC (3rd round)

=== 2010 World Youth Championships ===
In May 2010, Ward won his second World title at the World Youth Championships in Baku, Azerbaijan. He defeated Australia's Damien Hooper in the final, this time at middleweight.

Results:

- (Albania) Bekim Vjerdha: Won - RSC (2nd round)
- (Cuba) Frank Sánchez: Won - PTS (8:1)
- (Russia) Kazim Eneyev: Won - PTS (9:6)
- (Colombia) Leonardo Carrillo: Won - PTS (11:3)
- (Australia) Damien Hooper: Won - PTS (6:1)

=== 2010 Youth Olympics ===
Ward's gold in Yerevan qualified him for the inaugural Youth Olympic Games in Singapore. However, a painful hand injury suffered in the opening round of his opening bout versus Damien Hooper would scupper his medal hopes and, one-handed, he would lose to his Australian rival.

Results:

- (Australia) Damien Hooper: Lost - PTS (2–4)

=== 2011 European Amateur Championships ===
At the 2011 European Amateur Boxing Championships in Ankara, Ward met Nikita Ivanov in the light-heavyweight final, where he took the gold medal after a 20–12 victory over the Russian to become Ireland's youngest ever Senior European gold medallist.

Results:

- (Estonia) Ainar Karlson: Won - PTS (10:7)
- (Italy) Simone Fiori: Won - PTS (15:13)
- (Hungary) Imre Szello: Won - PTS (18:8)
- (Russia) Nikita Ivanov: Won - PTS (20:12)

=== 2011 World Amateur Championships ===
Ward suffered his first Senior defeat at the 2011 World Amateur Boxing Championships in Baku, Azerbaijan. The Irish teenager reached the Round of 16 where he was eliminated on a countback by Iranian veteran Ehsan Rouzbahani.

Results:

- (Tajikistan) Dilovarshakh Abdurakhmanov: Won - PTS (22:4)
- (Iran) Ehsan Rouzbahani: Lost - PTS (15:15+)

=== 2013 European Amateur Championships ===
After the Rouzbabhani defeat and his subsequent controversial loss to Bahram Muzzafer in the Olympic qualifiers in Trabzon, Ward's bad luck continued at the 2013 European Amateur Boxing Championships in Minsk. Here the reigning champion was eliminated in his opening fight where, winning handily, he was forced to pull out in the final round after a clash of knees with Mateusz Tryc.

Results:

- (Poland) Mateusz Tryc: Lost - RSCI (3rd round)

=== 2013 World Amateur Championships ===
In October 2013, at 19 years of age, Ward won a bronze medal at the World Amateur Boxing Championships in Almaty. Ward lost to title holder, 2011 World Champion Julio César la Cruz in the semi-final. The Cuban went on to retain his title with a gold medal in the final.

Results:

- (Poland) Mateusz Tryc: Won - PTS (3:0)
- (Hungary) Norbert Harcsa: Won - PTS (3:0)
- (Russia) Nikita Ivanov: Won - PTS (3:0)
- (Cuba) Julio César La Cruz: Lost - PTS (0:3)

=== 2015 European Amateur Championships ===
Ward won his second European gold in Samokov, Bulgaria in August. Despite an accidental clash of heads opening up a small cut above Ward's left eye, he continued a stylish performance to seal victory over Dutch fighter Peter Müllenberg in the final.

Results:

- (Russia) Idris Shakhmanov: Won - PTS (3:0)
- (Georgia (country)) Nikoloz Sekhniashvili: Won - PTS (3:0)
- (Belarus) Mikhail Dauhaliavets: Won - PTS (3:0)
- (Croatia) Hrvoje Sep: Won - PTS (3:0)
- (Netherlands) Peter Müllenberg: Won - PTS (3:0)

=== 2015 World Amateur Championships ===
In October, Ward returned to the World Championships, this time in Doha. Ward made it to the final but missed out on gold when he once again met world champion Julio César La Cruz. The '2015 AIBA World Boxer of the Year' made it three consecutive world championships despite a brave performance from Ward - five years his junior.

Results:

- (Ukraine) Oleksandr Khyzhniak: Won - PTS (3:0)
- (Belarus) Mikhail Dauhaliavets: Won - PTS (3:0)
- (Uzbekistan) Elshod Rasulov: Won - PTS (3:0)
- (Cuba) Julio César La Cruz: Lost - PTS (0:3)

=== 2016 Olympics ===
Ward's performances at the World Championships in Doha saw him earn qualification for the Olympics. One of the pre-tournament favourites, Ward was controversially eliminated in his opening bout following two separate points deductions which handed Ecuadorian Carlos Andres Mina a split-decision win.

Results:

- (Ecuador) Carlos Andres Mina: Lost - PTS (1–2)

=== 2017 European Amateur Championships ===
Ward won his hat-trick of continental golds at the 2017 European Amateur Boxing Championships in Kharkiv, Ukraine. Ward strolled to the final with a trio of facile, one-sided wins before overcoming Russian Muslim Gadzhimagomedov in a cagey gold medal match.

Results:

- (Slovakia) Matus Strnisko: Won - PTS (5:0)
- (Scotland) Sean Lazzerini: Won - PTS (5:0)
- (Italy) Valentino Manfredonia: Won - PTS (5:0)
- (Russia) Muslim Gadzhimagomedov: Won - PTS (5:0)

=== 2017 World Amateur Championships ===
Ward was again denied in a World Championships final by Julio César La Cruz in September 2017. Ward, the Irish team captain, made it to the final in Hamburg following wide preliminary wins over Iago Kiziria and Mikhail Dauhaliavets, before a dramatic split decision win over Bektemir Melikuziev. Versus La Cruz, Ward pushed the Cuban closer than ever but was still defeated.

Results:

- (Georgia (country)) Iago Kiziria: Won - PTS (5:0)
- (Belarus) Mikhail Dauhaliavets: Won - PTS (5:0)
- (Uzbekistan) Bektemir Melikuziev: Won - PTS (3:2)
- (Cuba) Julio César La Cruz: Lost - PTS (0:5)

== World Series of Boxing career ==
=== Season Three ===
Ward was signed by the British Lionhearts franchise for the third season of the World Series of Boxing which spanned 2012 and 2013. Fighting over the five-round format, Ward posted five wins and one loss in his opening season.

Results:

- (Hungary) Imre Szello: Won - PTS
- (Germany) Satula Abdulai: Won - RSC
- (Croatia) Marko Calic: Won - PTS
- (Algeria) Abdelhafid Benchabla: Lost - PTS
- (Ukraine) Denys Solonenko: Won - PTS
- (Albania) Christian Demaj: Won - PTS

=== Season Seven ===
Ward returned to the pro-styled format and the British Lionhearts in 2018 where he topped the individual light heavyweight rankings for the regular season following three dominant wins.

Results:

- (Croatia) Damir Plantic: Won - PTS
- (Bulgaria) Blagoy Naydenov: Won - PTS
- (France) Bakary Diabira: Won - RSC

== Professional boxing career ==
On 7 June 2019 it was announced that Ward had passed on attempting to qualify for a second Olympics and would sign a pro contract with the New York-based Times Square Boxing Co. with Lou DiBella and Ken Casey offering advisory roles. Ward began his pro career on 5 October 2019 at Madison Square Garden and it would end in disaster as the fighter dislocated his kneecap. The freak second-round injury in his bout with Marco Delgado handed Ward a technical knockout defeat. Joe started the road to recovery by defeating Luis Velasco and Fernando Alverez both by first-round TKO to set up his return bout with Marco Delgado which Ward won comfortably by a Unanimous Decision. Ward would then further his win streak by beating Tory Williams and Leandro Silva by Unanimous Decision each. Ward would then make his return to Madison Square Garden in a first round annihilation of Britton Norwood.

=== Zuffa Boxing ===
Ward is scheduled to compete in a light heavyweight bout at Zuffa Boxing 10 at the 3Arena in Dublin, Ireland, August 8, 2026.

== Professional boxing record ==
8 fights	7 wins	1 loss
By knockout	4	1
By decision	3	0

No.	Result	Record	Opponent	Type	Round, time	Date	Location	Notes
8	Win	7–1	(Mexico) Oscar Riojas	TKO	5 (8), 1:38	1 Apr 2022	(United States) The Dome at the Ballpark, Rosemont, Illinois, U.S.	
7	Win	6–1	(United States) Britton Norwood	TKO	1 (6), 1:35	11 Dec 2021	(United States) Madison Square Garden, New York, U.S.	
6	Win	5–1	(Brazil) Leandro Silva	UD	6	11 Nov 2021	(United States) The Paramount Theatre, Huntington, New York, U.S.	
5	Win	4–1	(United States) Tory Williams	UD	6	3 Aug 2021	(United States) The Theater at Madison Square Garden, New York City, New York, U.S.	
4	Win	3–1	(United States) Marco Delgado	UD	6	18 Mar 2021	Albergue Olímpico, Salinas, Puerto Rico	
3	Win	2–1	(Mexico) Fernando Miguel Tamayo	TKO	1 (6), 2:45	18 Dec 2020	Campestre Ojo de Agua, Ocotlán, Mexico	
2	Win	1–1	(Mexico) Luis Alberto Velasco	TKO	1 (6), 1:48	5 Dec 2020	Campestre Ojo de Agua, Ocotlán, Mexico	
1	Loss	0–1	(United States) Marco Delgado	TKO	2 (6), 1:00	5 Oct 2019	(United States) Madison Square Garden, New York City, New York, U.S.	Ward was unable to continue due to a knee injury
