= Yahia El-Mekachari =

Tunisian boxer (born 1990)

Yahia El-Mekachari (born February 7, 1990, in Gafsa) is a Tunisian light heavyweight amateur boxer who competed at the 2012 Olympics.

At the All-Africa Games 2011 he lost to eventual winner Abdelhafid Benchebla 7:14. but won the 2011 African Championships and the 2011 Pan-Arab Games.

He won the 2012 African Boxing Olympic Qualification Tournament to qualify for the 2012 Olympics. At the Olympics he defeated veteran Jakhon Qurbonov 16:8 but lost to Elshod Rasulov 6:13 in the second round.
