= Hrvoje Sep =

Croatian boxer

Personal information
- Born: 26 February 1986 (age 40) Vinkovci, Croatia
- Height: 1.75 m (5 ft 9 in)
- Weight: Light heavyweight

Boxing career
- Stance: Orthodox

Boxing record
- Total fights: 15
- Wins: 12
- Win by KO: 9
- Losses: 2
- Draws: 1
Medal record
Men's amateur boxing
Representing Croatia
European Amateur Championships
Bronze medal – third place	2015 Samokov	Light heavyweight
Bronze medal – third place	2011 Ankara	Light Heavyweight

Hrvoje Sep (born 26 February 1986) is a Croatian professional boxer.

== Amateur career ==
He was boxing for BK Leonardo under Leonardo Pjetraj.

Sep was 6 times champion of Croatia (2008, 2009, 2010, 2013, 2014, 2016), two times runner-up (2012, 2015).

He was also WSB Season I Champion (As member of Paris United team) and two times (Season III and season V) as member of Astana Arlans team, with a 22–8 record.

He competed in the light heavyweight event at the 2016 Summer Olympics, defeating Abdelrahman Salah in 1st round while losing to hometown Michel Borges in 2nd.

=== Olympic Games results ===
At the 2016 Summer Olympics in Rio de Janeiro, boxing as a Light Heavyweight (81 kg):

- Round 1/32 - Defeated Abdelrahman Salah (Egypt) 2–1
- Round 1/16 - Lost to Michel Borges (Brazil) 0–3

=== World Amateur Championships results ===
At the 2009 AIBA World Boxing Championships in Milan, Italy, boxing as a Light Heavyweight (81 kg):

- Round 1/64 - Defeated Siarhei Karneyeu (Ukraine) 16–0
- Round 1/32 - Lost to Jeysson Monroy Varela (Colombia) 8–16

At the 2011 AIBA World Boxing Championships in Baku, Azerbaijan, boxing as a Light Heavyweight (81 kg):

- 1st round bye
- Round 1/32 - Lost to Džemal Bošnjak (Bosnia and Herzegovina) 8–17

At the 2013 AIBA World Boxing Championships in Almaty, Kazakhstan, boxing as a Light Heavyweight (81 kg):

- 1st round bye
- Round 1/32 - Lost to Ali Ghoussoun (Syria) 1–2

At the 2015 AIBA World Boxing Championships in Doha, Qatar, boxing as a Light Heavyweight (81 kg):

- Round 1/32 - Defeated Juan Carlos Carrillo (Colombia) 3–0
- Round 1/16 - Defeated Aaron Spagnolo (Australia) 3–0
- Quarterfinals - Lost to Julio César la Cruz (Cuba) 0–3

== Mixed martial arts record ==
Professional record breakdown
1 match	1 win	0 losses
By knockout	1	0

Res.	Record	Opponent	Method	Event	Date	Round	Time	Location	Notes
Win	1–0	Vaso Bakočević	TKO (punches)	Fight Nation Championship 31	May 30, 2026	1	3:20	Belgrade, Serbia	Middleweight debut.

== Professional boxing record ==
16 fights	13 wins	2 losses
By knockout	10	0
By decision	3	2
Draws	1	

No.	Result	Record	Opponent	Type	Round, time	Date	Location	Notes
16	Win	13–2–1	Aleksa Kesic	TKO	1 (6), 0:45	23 Nov 2025	Sport Complex BK Zagreb, Zagreb, Croatia	
15	Draw	12–2–1	Dan Azeez	PTS	8	15 Jun 2024	Selhurst Park, London, England	
14	Loss	12–2	Omar Garcia	MD	8	27 Jan 2024	Teatro Cupula Arenas, Barcelona, Spain	
13	Win	12–1	Nika Gvajava	TKO	3 (8), 0:47	22 Oct 2022	Sportska Dvorana, Zabok, Croatia	
12	Loss	11–1	Ričards Bolotņiks	UD	8	1 Apr 2022	Pavelló de la Vall d'Hebron, Barcelona, Spain	
11	Win	11–0	Serhiy Demchenko	UD	6	5 Nov 2021	PalaEur, Rome, Italy	
10	Win	10–0	Vedran Šoškan	RTD	1 (6), 3:00	14 Dec 2019	Congress Centrum, Oberhausen, Germany	
9	Win	9–0	Janos Lakatos	KO	1 (6), 1:00	6 Oct 2019	Arena Stožice, Ljubljana, Slovenia	
8	Win	8–0	Siniša Kondić	TKO	1 (6), 1:46	10 Aug 2019	Marina Frapa Resort, Rogoznica, Croatia	
7	Win	7–0	Aleksandar Petrović	TKO	1 (6), 0:45	23 Jun 2019	Kaštel Kambelovac, Croatia	
6	Win	6–0	Attila Koros	KO	2 (6), 0:59	25 May 2019	Sporthalle Grossmatt, Kirchberg, Bern, Switzerland	
5	Win	5–0	Janos Vass	TKO	2 (6), 2:15	3 May 2019	BK Sensei, Čapljina, Bosnia and Herzegovina	
4	Win	4–0	Darko Knežević	TKO	1 (6), 2:50	23 Feb 2019	Volkshaus-Weiz, Weiz, Austria	
3	Win	3–0	Levan Lukhutashvili	PTS	6	21 Oct 2017	TipsArena, Linz, Austria	
2	Win	2–0	Mamadou Ba	UD	6	24 Jun 2017	La Salamandre, Pont-Sainte-Maxence, France	
1	Win	1–0	Milan Petrović	KO	1 (6), 0:53	22 Apr 2017	Tivoli Hall, Ljubljana, Slovenia	
