= Meng Fanlong =

Chinese boxer

Personal information
- Nickname: Cold Blood
- Nationality: Chinese
- Born: 5 February 1988 (age 38) Chifeng, Inner Mongolia, China
- Height: 6 ft 2 in (188 cm)
- Weight: Light-heavyweight

Boxing career
- Reach: 75 1/2 in (192 cm)
- Stance: Southpaw

Boxing record
- Total fights: 18
- Wins: 17
- Win by KO: 10
- Losses: 1

Meng Fanlong (born 5 February 1988) is a Chinese professional boxer who held the IBF Inter-Continental light-heavyweight title between 2017 and 2019.

== Amateur career ==
As an amateur, he represented China at the 2012 London Olympics, competing in the light-heavyweight division.

At the 2010 Asian Games (results) he beat two opponents before being outclassed 1:12 by Elshod Rasulov.

At the Asian Championships he lost the final to Kim Hyeong-kyu (KOR) 13:15. At the 2011 World Amateur Boxing Championships he beat three opponents before losing to Adilbek Niyazymbetov.

At the 2012 Olympics he defeated Ahmed Barki 17:8 but lost to Yamaguchi Falcão Florentino 17:17 on countback.

== Professional career ==
=== Meng vs. Buglioni ===
On 24 November 2018, Meng fought and beat Frank Buglioni by Technical knockout in the 5th round.

=== Meng vs. Deines ===
In his next bout, Meng fought Adam Deines, who was ranked #5 by the IBF and #11 by the WBO at light heavyweight. Meng won the fight via unanimous decision.

=== Meng vs. Pascal ===
Meng lost from Jean Pascal via unanimous decision in their 12 round contest. The scorecards read 111-116, 112-115, 113-114 in favor of Pascal.

== Professional boxing record ==
18 fights	17 wins	1 loss
By knockout	10	0
By decision	7	1

No.	Result	Record	Opponent	Type	Round, time	Date	Location	Notes
18	Loss	17–1	Jean Pascal	UD	12	20 May 2022	Whitesands Events Center, Plant City, Florida, U.S.	
17	Win	17–0	Israel Duffus	UD	10	29 Oct 2021	Silver Spurs Arena, Kissimmee, Florida, US	
16	Win	16–0	Gilberto Rubio	TKO	2 (6), 1:36	5 Oct 2019	PAL Center, Hockessin, Delaware, US	
15	Win	15–0	Adam Deines	UD	12	1 Jun 2019	Wynn Palace, Macau, SAR	Retained IBF Inter-Continental light-heavyweight title
14	Win	14–0	Frank Buglioni	TKO	5 (10), 1:58	24 Nov 2018	Casino de Salle Medecin, Monte Carlo, Monaco	Retained IBF Inter-Continental light-heavyweight title
13	Win	13–0	Chris Eppley	TKO	1 (6), 0:51	20 Jul 2018	WinnaVegas Casino & Resort, Sloan, Iowa, US	
12	Win	12–0	Emmanuel Danso	UD	10	28 Oct 2017	East Asian Games Dome, Macau, SAR	Won vacant IBF Inter-Continental light-heavyweight title
11	Win	11–0	Brad Austin	UD	8	29 Apr 2017	CenterStage@NoDa, Charlotte, North Carolina, US	
10	Win	10–0	Gasan Gasanov	TKO	1 (10), 1:52	21 Jan 2017	Hebei Sports Venue, Shijiazhuang, China	Won vacant WBO Oriental light-heavyweight title
9	Win	9–0	Zura Mekereshvili	MD	8	30 Sep 2016	Wenzhou Gymnasium, Wenzhou, China	
8	Win	8–0	Daniel Judah	KO	5 (8), 2:08	22 Jul 2016	Claridge Hotel & Casino, Atlantic City, New Jersey, US	
7	Win	7–0	Rob Powdrill	KO	4 (8), 2:04	25 May 2016	Diamond Court, Beijing, China	
6	Win	6–0	Kenny Gaudreau	TKO	1 (4), 2:59	16 Jan 2016	ABC Sports Complex, Springfield, Virginia, US	
5	Win	5–0	Andre Sawyer	TKO	2 (4), 2:15	14 Nov 2015	Auditorio Municipal, Comerío, Puerto Rico	
4	Win	4–0	Devonte Hopkins	TKO	1 (4), 1:32	17 Oct 2015	Marina Bay SportsPlex, Quincy, Massachusetts, US	
3	Win	3–0	Michael Mithchell	UD	4	17 Oct 2015	Veteran's Memorial Park, Beach Haven, New Jersey, US	
2	Win	2–0	Alberto Avina	KO	2 (4), 0:31	20 Jun 2015	Oracle Arena, Oakland, California, US	
1	Win	1–0	Marcellus Yates	MD	4	17 Jan 2015	Mohegan Sun Arena, Montville, Connecticut, US	
