= Julio César La Cruz =

Cuban boxer (born 1989)

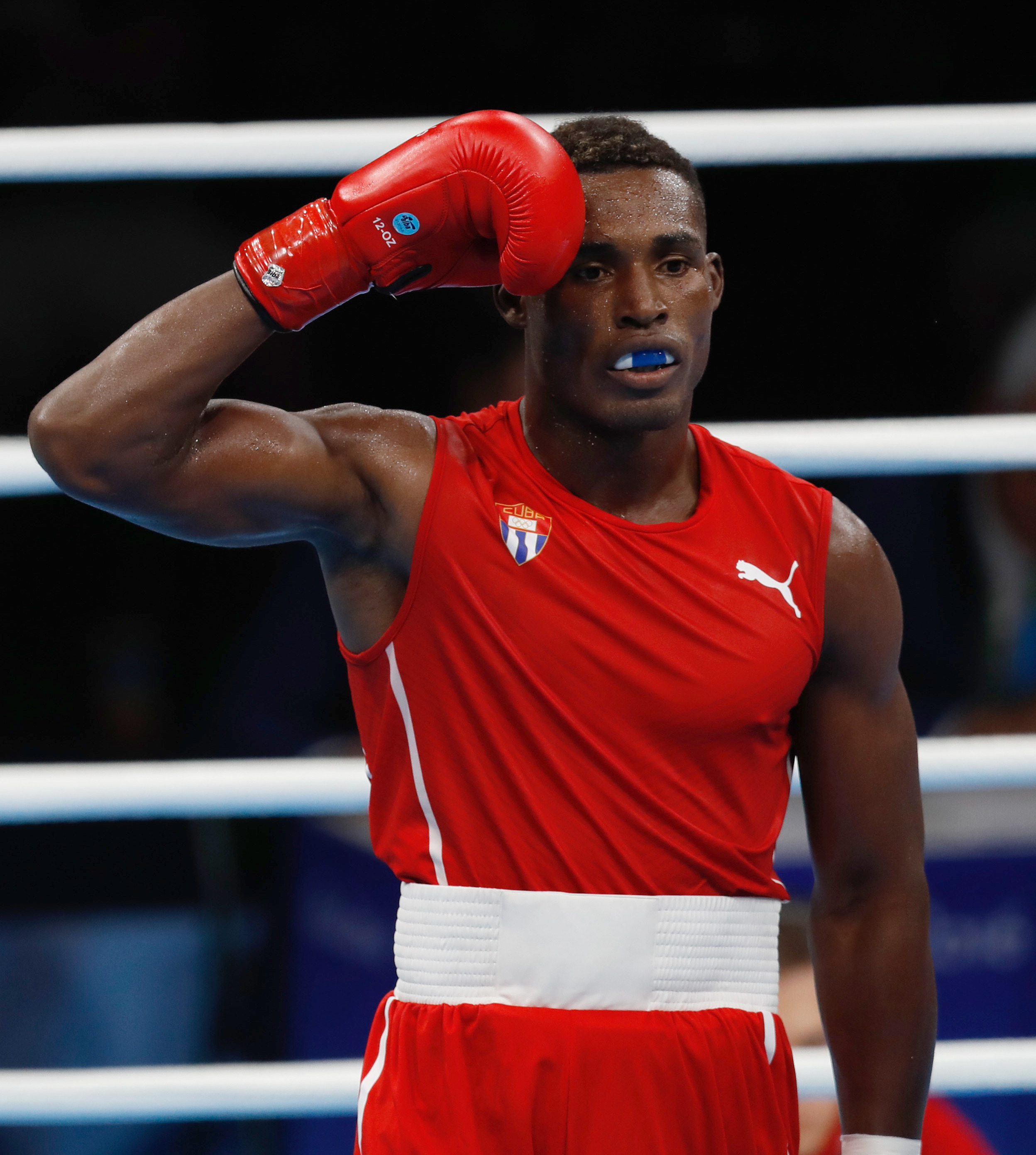
- La Cruz at the 2016 Olympics

Personal information
- Nickname: La Sombra
- Born: Julio César De La Cruz Peraza; 11 August 1989 (age 37) Camagüey, Cuba
- Height: 1.82 m (6 ft 0 in)
- Weight: Heavyweight

Boxing career
- Reach: 78 in (198 cm)
- Stance: Orthodox

Boxing record
- Total fights: 5
- Wins: 5
- Win by KO: 4
Medal record
Men's boxing
Representing Cuba
Olympic Games
Gold medal – first place	2016 Rio de Janeiro	Light heavyweight
Gold medal – first place	2020 Tokyo	Heavyweight
World Championships
Bronze medal – third place	2025 Liverpool	+90 kg
AIBA World Championships
Gold medal – first place	2011 Baku	Light heavyweight
Gold medal – first place	2013 Almaty	Light heavyweight
Gold medal – first place	2015 Doha	Light heavyweight
Gold medal – first place	2017 Hamburg	Light heavyweight
Gold medal – first place	2021 Belgrade	Heavyweight
Bronze medal – third place	2019 Yekaterinburg	Light heavyweight
Pan American Games
Gold medal – first place	2011 Guadalajara	Light heavyweight
Gold medal – first place	2015 Toronto	Light heavyweight
Gold medal – first place	2019 Lima	Light heavyweight
Gold medal – first place	2023 Santiago	Heavyweight
Central American and Caribbean Games
Gold medal – first place	2014 Veracruz	Light heavyweight
Gold medal – first place	2018 Barranquilla	Light heavyweight
Gold medal – first place	2023 San Salvador	Heavyweight
Silver medal – second place	2026 Santo Domingo	Heavyweight
Pan American Championship
Gold medal – first place	2017 Tegucigalpa	Light heavyweight

Julio César De La Cruz Peraza (born 11 August 1989) is a Cuban professional boxer. As an amateur he won gold medals at the 2016 and 2020 Summer Olympics, and the 2011, 2013, 2015, 2017 and 2021 AIBA World Boxing Championships. As a professional, he has qualified for the 2024 Summer Olympics.

== Amateur career ==
At the 2011 World Championships, he captained the Cuban national team, where he beat number 1 seeded Egor Mekhontsev from Russia on points (21–15) in semi-final, and defeated Adilbek Niyazymbetov from Kazakhstan after 3 rounds by 17–13 finishing score in final, being the 4th World amateur boxing champion boxer from Camagüey. He grasped the gold medal at 2011 Pan American Games in which Cuba national team topped the medal table with 8 golds and 1 silver. He beat Carlos Gongora of Ecuador in the semi-finals and Yamaguchi Falcão Florentino of Brazil in the final on points (22–12).

At the 2012 Summer Olympics, he was upset by Falcão Florentino in the quarterfinals in a rematch from the 2011 Pan American Games. At the 2013 World Championships in Almaty, he beat Serge Michel, Oleksandr Ganzulia, Abdelhafid Benchabla and Joe Ward, before again beating Niyazymbetov in the final. On 4 January 2014, Julio Cesar la Cruz was hospitalized after being shot outside of a recreation center in his hometown of Camagüey. In 2015, he again won the gold at the AIBA World Boxing Championships held in Doha.

He won the gold medal at the men's light heavyweight event at the 2016 Summer Olympics. La Cruz sports a 21–3 record in the World Series of Boxing. In the 2020 Summer Olympics, he gained attention for expressing his support for the Cuban government by declaring after his quarterfinal win over a Cuban-born Spanish opponent, "Patria y vida, no. ¡Patria o Muerte, Venceremos!", citing the national motto of Cuba which was created by Fidel Castro. In 2021, he again won the gold at the men's heavyweight held in Tokyo.

== Professional boxing record ==
5 fights	5 wins	0 losses
By knockout	4	0
By decision	1	0

No.	Result	Record	Opponent	Type	Round, time	Date	Location	Notes
5	Win	5–0	Dilan Prašović	TKO	3 (12), 1:30	14 Apr 2025	Hotel Melia International, Varadero, Cuba	Retained WBA Gold bridgerweight title
4	Win	4–0	Jeison Troncoso	TKO	7 (10), 1:49	14 Dec 2024	Baha Mar, Nassau, Bahamas	Retained WBA Gold bridgerweight title
3	Win	3–0	Austine Nnamdi	UD	10	16 Dec 2023	Palais du Peuple, Conakry, Guinea	Won inaugural WBA Gold bridgerweight title
2	Win	2–0	Juan Rodolfo Juarez	TKO	4 (6)	28 Aug 2022	Club Social y Deportivo El Porvenir, Quilmes, Argentina	
1	Win	1–0	Deivis Casseres	KO	2 (6), 1:40	20 May 2022	Palenque de la FNSM, Aguascalientes, Mexico	

Olympic Games
Preceded by Mijaín López; Yaime Perez	Flag bearer for Cuba; Paris 2024 with Idalys Ortiz	Succeeded by Incumbent
