= Artur Beterbiev =

Russian-Canadian boxer (born 1985)

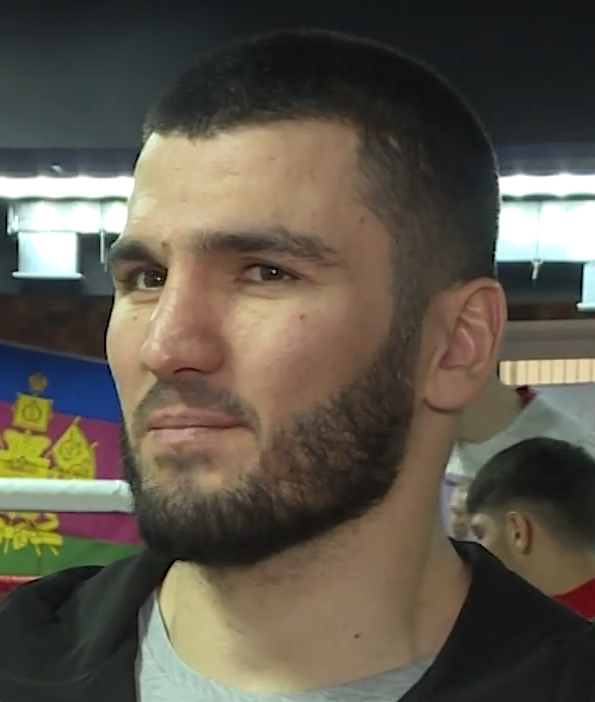
- Beterbiev in 2019

Personal information
- Native name: Артур Асилбекович Бетербиев
- Citizenship: Russia; Canada
- Born: Artur Asilbekovich Beterbiev; 21 January 1985 (age 41) Khasavyurt, Dagestan ASSR, Russian SFSR, Soviet Union
- Height: 5 ft 11 1/2 in (182 cm)
- Weight: Light-heavyweight

Boxing career
- Reach: 73 in (185 cm)
- Stance: Orthodox

Boxing record
- Total fights: 22
- Wins: 21
- Win by KO: 20
- Losses: 1
Medal record
Men's amateur boxing
Representing Russia
European Championships
Gold medal – first place	2006 Plovdiv	Light-heavyweight
Gold medal – first place	2010 Moscow	Light-heavyweight
World Championships
Gold medal – first place	2009 Milan	Light-heavyweight
Silver medal – second place	2007 Chicago	Light-heavyweight
World Cup
Gold medal – first place	2008 Moscow	Light-heavyweight

Artur Asilbekovich Beterbiev (Note: Chechen: Бетербиев Асильбекан Артур Russian: Артур Асильбекович Бетербиев) (born 21 January 1985) is a Russian and Canadian professional boxer. He held the undisputed (Note: Four-belt era: World Boxing Association (WBA) (Super version), World Boxing Council (WBC), International Boxing Federation (IBF), and World Boxing Organization (WBO) titles.) light-heavyweight championship between 2024 and 2025. He also held the International Boxing Organization (IBO) and Ring magazine titles during his reign as champion.

Beterbiev is the first boxer to become the undisputed light-heavyweight champion since Roy Jones Jr. last held that distinction in 2002, (Note: Three-belt era: World Boxing Association (WBA) (Unified version), World Boxing Council (WBC), International Boxing Federation (IBF) titles.) and is the first to do so in the "four-belt" era.

As an amateur, Beterbiev won a light-heavyweight silver medal at the 2007 World Championships, gold at the 2008 World Cup and 2009 World Championships, as well as gold at the 2006 and 2010 European Championships. He also reached the heavyweight quarter-finals at the 2012 Olympics.

He is known for his exceptional punching power, having won his first 20 professional fights by knockout or stoppage after debuting in 2013. His perfect KO record ended when he defeated Dmitry Bivol by majority decision to become undisputed champion, whom he then lost to in an immediate rematch, also by majority decision.

== Amateur career ==
Beterbiev competed as a light-heavyweight and heavyweight in his amateur career. He won the 2006 European Amateur Boxing Championships beating Kenneth Egan and Ismail Sillakh among others. He beat Egor Mekhontsev but lost to two-time world champion Evgeny Makarenko in 2006. In 2007, in Kaliningrad, Artur Beterbiev beat Oleksandr Usyk. Also in 2007, he beat future unified light-heavyweight champion Sergey Kovalev in the semi-finals, and eventually beat Evgeny Makarenko in finals to qualify for the World Championships. In the finals of the World Championships he faced the little-known Abbos Atoev but lost in an upset.

At the 2008 Olympics he beat Kennedy Katende 15:3, then at the round of 16 he fell controversially to local boxer Zhang Xiaoping who went on to win the gold medal. At the 2009 World Championships, he beat young Cuban Jose Larduet and Uzbek Elshod Rasulov to claim the light heavyweight title.

At the 2011 World Championships he lost in the quarter-finals to eventual winner Oleksandr Usyk by 13–17. At the 2012 Olympics he edged out Michael Hunter but lost again by 13–17 to Usyk. Both of these were in the heavyweight division.

Beterbiev had more than 300 amateur fights. It has been roughly estimated that he won 295 amateur bouts and lost 5 others. However, his confirmed record finds that he had at least 102 wins and no fewer than 13 losses.

== Professional career ==
=== Early career ===
Beterbiev moved to Montreal to pursue a professional career. He won his professional debut via a second-round TKO over Christian Cruz at the Bell Centre on 8 July 2013. Beterbiev fought on the undercard of Jean Pascal vs. Lucian Bute, beating Gabriel Lecrosnier by TKO on the fourth round.

=== Rise up the ranks ===
After winning his first five professional bouts, Beterbiev would face off against former IBF light-heavyweight champion Tavoris Cloud for the vacant NABA title on 27 September 2014. After a tentative opening minute from both fighters, Beterbiev opened up and began landing powerful shots that visibly rocked Cloud. In the final minute, the Russian would drop his opponent three times via combinations. Before this fight, Cloud had never been dropped in his professional career. Beterbiev would close the show in round two, landing multiple hard shots to the head that knocked Cloud out, giving Beterbiev his first title.

In December 2014, Beterbiev stopped light heavyweight prospect Jeff Page Jr. in two rounds, winning the vacant IBF North American and NABO light-heavyweight titles. However, Beterbiev was dropped for the first time in a professional fight in the first round of the fight by a straight right to the head. "I felt a bit sleepy before the fight. I think I just lost my concentration for a fraction of a second," Beterbiev said of the knockdown.

Afterwards, Beterbiev would face off against another former IBF world champion, Gabriel Campillo, with his North American title at stake. Both men began cautiously until Beterbiev dropped Campillo late in the first round. The Russian slowly wore down his foe with multiple straight rights to the body. Finally in the fourth, Beterbiev would land a straight/uppercut hybrid that would hit Campillo square on the chin, and followed it up with a perfunctory left hook before walking to his corner while his opponent slid to the canvas, barely conscious. The PSI detector in his gloves stated that the first punch landed with 973 pounds per square inch.

Beterbiev improved his record to 9–0 against Alexander Johnson on 12 June 2015, at the UIC Pavilion in Chicago. Beterbiev knocked Johnson down twice in the fifth and a third time in the seventh before finishing him at 1:38 of the round, clobbering him with a left hook and finishing him off with an overhand right that put Johnson through the ropes down and out. With the win, Beterbiev added the vacant WBO International light-heavyweight title to his other four minor titles.

In June 2016, Beterbiev defeated Ezequiel Maderna by round 4 TKO, dropping him four times along the way. Beterbiev's eleventh professional win came against Isidro Prieto, whom he knocked out after a flurry of punches at the end of the first round. Beterbiev had several title eliminators and world title shots fall through, including bouts against Sullivan Barrera, Igor Mikhalkin, and Sergey Kovalev. He also faced long periods of inactivity in a promotional dispute against Yvon Michel.

=== IBF light heavyweight champion ===
==== Beterbiev vs. Kölling ====
In July 2017, Beterbiev had yet another world title eliminator fall through. He was scheduled to face Enrico Kölling, with the winner becoming the IBF's mandatory challenger to unified world champion Andre Ward, but the fight was never finalized amidst Beterbiev's contract dispute. A purse bid was later won by Top Rank, with the American promotion planning to broadcast the fight on ESPN, as part of a show including Jessie Magdaleno. The show was later announced to be taking place on 11 November at the Save Mart Arena in Fresno. Magdaleno would later drop out with an injury.

Andre Ward officially announced his retirement on September, therefore the IBF title became vacant. The IBF later announced that the fight between Beterbiev and Kölling would be for the now-vacant world title. Beterbiev dominated Kölling in a dull fight, walking him down while Kölling refused to engage. Beterbiev finally scored a knockdown in round 12, as Kölling went down on one knee and received a count. When the fight resumed, Beterbiev dropped Kölling again and the referee waved the fight off. Beterbiev landed 322 of 1,111 punches (29 percent) while Kölling landed 64 of 252 blows (25 percent).

==== Beterbiev vs. Johnson ====
In October 2018, Beterbiev fought British champion Callum Johnson in a mandatory defence of his IBF world title in Chicago. Johnson, ranked 7th in the world with the IBF at the time, was coming off a round 1 TKO of domestic rival Frank Buglioni; his first fight in nearly one-and-a-half years. Beterbiev accepted the fight on a co-promotional deal with Matchroom Boxing USA, which was aired live on DAZN in the US and on Sky Sports in the UK.

Beterbiev won an action-packed fight by round 4 KO, which saw both men hurt and knocked down; Johnson in round 1 by a Beterbiev right hand followed by Beterbiev in round 2 from a Johnson left hook. Both men fought aggressively but it was Beterbiev who knocked down Johnson a final time in round 4 with another right hand to the head; the British fighter failed to beat the count and Beterbiev retained his world title.

==== Beterbiev vs. Kalajdzic ====
In March 2019, Beterbiev signed a long-term promotional deal with Bob Arum's Top Rank. On signing with Top Rank, following his recent promotional issues, Beterbiev said, "It’s been difficult for me, because I just want to concentrate on fighting (in the ring), not in (court). That’s all behind me now, it’s a big relief to be with Top Rank and to finally just move on with my career." Beterbiev was to have his fights broadcast on ESPN. Beterbiev's world title win was also broadcast on ESPN. They wasted little time in announcing his second defence, scheduled to take place on 4 May against 27 year old Radivoje Kalajdzic (24–1, 17 KOs). The card took place at the Stockton Arena in Stockton, California. Top Rank wanted to get Beterbiev in the ring after being out of action for over 12 months. The aim was to have him defend the title before he observed Ramadan. The fight took place the day before. Kalajdzic had won 3 bouts in a row after his controversial 8-round split decision loss to Marcus Browne in April 2016. Kalajdzic headed into the fight with Beterbiev with confidence after calling his resume 'thin'. Both made weight with Beterbiev coming in at 174.4 pounds and Kalajdzic lower at 173 pounds.

In front of 10,105 fans, Beterbiev kept his 100% knockout streak intact after stopping Kalajdzic in the fifth round. The beginning of the end came towards the end of the third round, when Beterbiev dropped Kalajdzic. He stumbled backwards to his corner. In the fourth round, both came out firing shots, with both landing clean, stunning each other at times. Beterbiev was on the attack to start round 5. He cut the ring off and pinned Kalajdzic against the ropes, landing a flurry of shots to his body and head. This prompted referee Dan Stell to step in and stop the fight. The live card averaged 480,000 viewers. Including the replay, which aired hours later, the combined total was 600,000 viewers.

=== Unified light heavyweight champion ===
==== Beterbiev vs. Gvozdyk ====
The win over Kalajdzic would ultimately set up a unification fight against WBC champion Oleksandr Gvozdyk 17–0, 14 KOs) for some time in Autumn 2019 on ESPN. In July it was announced that the fight would be on 18 October, at the Liacouras Center in Philadelphia. The winner would be ordered to make a defence against IBF mandatory challenger Meng Fanlong. They both fought each other in 2009 in Turkey in the amateurs, which saw Beterbiev come away with a second-round stoppage win. Gvozdyk admitted he was not mentally nor physically ready for that fight, as Beterbiev was an established amateur. One of the conditions of Beterbiev signing with Top Rank, was to land the unification fight. He said, "It’s a big fight, the fight that I really wanted when I signed (with Top Rank). I’m very (pleased) it’s happening." Beterbiev also knew he would be kept active. He had not fought twice in the same year since 2016. Beterbiev's power and 100% knockout ratio was also a talk before each of his fights. He told reporters the knockout was not important and the game plan is to win, whichever way that happened. His trainer Marc Ramsey also shared the same notion. Both weighed under the limit with Beterbiev at 174.5 pounds and Gvozdyk coming in at 174.3 pounds.

The bout took place in front of 3,283 spectators. The fight was competitive, with Gvozdyk's accurate punching countering Beterbiev's pressure, but Gvozdyk began to fade as the fight went on. There was little controversy in the opening round when Beterbiev pushed Gvozdyk, causing him to fall on the canvas. No punch was landed, however referee Gary Rosato gave the knockdown. This prompted Gvozdyk's trainer to jump on to the apron and protest. After the round, the Pennsylvania State Athletic Commission executive director Gregory Sirb, who was in attendance, viewed the replay footage and overruled the referees decision to call the knockdown. In the 9th round, Beterbiev took control of the fight, and had Gvozdyk struggling to stay on his feet. Gvozdyk survived the round but was visibly fatigued coming into the 10th. Beterbiev applied the pressure in the 10th and Gvozdyk took a knee early in the round. He got up but soon went down again after another flurry from Beterbiev, and the referee warned that another knockdown would mean the end of the fight. After another exchange where Beterbiev came out on top, Gvozdyk took a knee once more, resulting in a TKO victory for Beterbiev.

Gvozdyk was leading on the scorecards at the time of stoppage, with two judges seeing the fight 87–83, 86-85 for Gvozdyk, and one judge seeing it 83–87 for Beterbiev. When asked about being down on two of the scorecards, Beterbiev replied, "I'm not surprised. I don't care about the judges." CompuBox showed Beterbiev was busier and sharper, landing 161 of 515 punches thrown (31%) and Gvozdyk landed with 118 of 614 thrown (19%). Beterbiev's next move was to get through his mandatory and then to continue unifying. Top Rank and Roc Nation Sports, who promoted Fanlong, had already discussed the fight. Both boxers were guaranteed a $1.5 million purse for their efforts. The fight averaged of 635,000 viewers. Gvozdyk suffered a concussion following the fight and taken to Temple University Hospital, where he stayed for two nights for observation. He was given the all clear.

==== Beterbiev vs. Deines ====
Beterbiev was originally scheduled to fight Meng Fanlong (16–0, 10 KOs) on 28 March 2020, but the fight was scrapped due to the coronavirus pandemic. Because Meng could not fight in Russia in a rescheduled fight and return to China or the United States due to visa issues, Beterbiev chose to make an optional defense against IBF #5 ranked, Adam Deines (19–1–1, 10 KOs). It was unknown whether Fanlong would remain mandatory. After looking at a number of dates, the fight was announced to take place on 23 October 2020, on a Friday night ESPN special from Moscow. The event would mark Beterbiev's first professional fight in his native Russia.

Only days after the fight was announced, it as reported that Beterbiev had suffered an injury to his ribs following 'technical sparring'. Marc Ramsey stated the pain began after weights training. A fracture was found following an MRI scan. A number of dates were being explored for the fight to be rescheduled with 11 January 2021 being the target. This time, it was Top Rank, who said the date did not work for them, forcing the Russian promoters to postpone the event again. A new date of 30 January 2021 was confirmed for the bout to take place at VTB Arena in Moscow, only for it to be postponed again, this time with Beterbiev testing positive for COVID-19. By 14 January, Beterbiev was fully recovered and a new date of 20 March was set, to take place at the Megasport Arena in Moscow. Beterbiev was a 33–1 favorite for the fight, which would also satisfy his mandatory obligation, despite Fanlong still being ranked #1 by the IBF.

In his first fight in 519 days, Beterbiev stopped Deines in the tenth round with a vicious left hook, handing him his first KO defeat in his professional career. Deines was dropped in the opening round following a left hook. Beterbiev applied constant pressure throughout the fight which left Deines retreating. Before round 9, trainer Ramsey urged Beterbiev to 'wake up', wanting him to show more urgency. After Deines was dropped in the tenth, his corner had seen enough and stopped the fight. Beterbiev landed 159 of 560 punches thrown (28%) and Deines landed only 77 of his 402 thrown (19%). The next step was for him to unify against the winner of Joe Smith Jr. and Maxim Vlasov, for the WBO title. The fight was also promoter under Top Rank. Despite the stoppage win, Beterbiev was far from satisfied with his performance. He allowed Deines to land on him more than he should have. He said, "A lot of things didn't work out as they should have [in the fight]. Maybe the time zone, maybe something else. My trainer said that I was asleep until the ninth round. And the opponent was strong." His trainer Marc Ramsey however, praised his performance. Deines on the other hand felt his corner should not have been so quick to throw in the towel. The fight peaked 289,000 viewers on ESPN, where it aired in the afternoon in the US. The average viewership for the main event was 287,000, with the whole card averaging 233,000 viewers.

==== Beterbiev vs. Browne ====
On 20 August 2021, Beterbiev was ordered by the WBC to make a mandatory title defense against Marcus Browne. The two camps failed to come to terms during the allowed negotiation period, which prompted the WBC to call for a purse bid, which was won by Beterbiev's Top Rank, who offered $1,005,000 for the rights to promote the fight, while their bidding rivals TGB Promotions offered $1,000,001. Beterbiev’s guaranteed purse was $696,150, while Browne was guaranteed $298,350. The remaining $110,500 (10%) was to be witheld and later awarded to the winner, as per WBC rulings. It was announced his second unified title defense would take place on 17 December, at the Bell Centre in Montreal, Quebec, Canada on ESPN+. In preparation for the fight, Browne moved to Dallas to train with world renowned trainer Derrick James. At the weigh in, Beterbiev came in at 175 pounds, after initially weighing in at 175.2 pounds, over the limit. He was given two hours to lose the excess weight. Browne weighed 174.6 pounds at his first attempt.

After being forced to battle on with a nasty cut to his head, Beterbiev wore down and stopped Browne, winning the fight via ninth-round technical knockout. Browne was ahead on two of the three judges scorecards after three rounds. It was an accidental clash of heads which caused a cut above Browne's right eye and Beterbiev a three-inch-long gash in between his eyes. The cut added some tenacity in his work and he began to take over. Beterbiev showed tremendous strength and character to continue attacking Browne, to ensure the referee or ringside doctor didn't need to intervene. Beterbiev pressing on Browne continually, eventually scoring a knockdown in the seventh round from left body shot and the same punch scored him a knockdown in the ninth round. Browne was unable to continue, giving Beterbiev his win, 46 seconds into the round. Speaking to ringside reporters, Beterbiev said, "I'm happy to win. We're ready for any fight. We're looking for the best. To be the best, you have to beat the best." According to Compubox, Beterbiev outlanded Browne 117 to 64 in punches landed. 95 of which were power shots. He landed 36 in round seven alone.

Beterbiev discussed the cut and did not agree it was accidental. He said, "I am convinced that it was intentional. 1000%. I don’t like it when boxers do things like that. I found that unsportsmanlike and dirty. Certain southpaws are good boxers and have beautiful skills, but not [Browne]." The cut affected his ability to focus during the later rounds.

==== Beterbiev vs. Smith Jr. ====
On 13 February 2022, Top Rank boss Bob Arum revealed that Beterbiev was in ongoing negotiations with WBO light-heavyweight champion Joe Smith Jr. The planned three-belt light-heavyweight unification bout would take place in summer, as Beterbiev would be unable to face Smith Jr. earlier due to his participation in Ramadan. In April 2022, following the WBC and IBF decisions to bar fights involving boxers from Russia or Belarus, it was reported that Beterbiev would instead fight as a Canadian in his expected unification bout with Smith Jr. in June. WBC president Mauricio Sulaiman further stressed that Beterbiev had been living in Canada for 15 years, held a Canadian passport, Canadian residency, and a Canadian boxing license. The bout was officially announced for 18 June 2022, and took place at the Hulu Theater in New York City.

The attendance on the night was 4,537. In a dominant performance, Beterbiev knocked down Smith Jr. three times in the opening two rounds en route to a second-round technical knockout, unifying three major world light-heavyweight titles. After the fight, Beterbiev indicated that he would prefer to face undefeated WBA (Super) champion Dmitry Bivol in his next fight, rather than WBO mandatory challenger Anthony Yarde, stating, "Unification fights are more interesting and motivating, I would prefer to be undisputed." According to CompuBox Beterbiev outlanded Smith Jr, landing with 48 of 102 punches thrown (47%) compared to just 11 of 67 (16.4%) from Smith Jr. The card averaged 912,000 viewers.

==== Beterbiev vs. Yarde ====
On 19 June 2022, a day after Beterbiev unified against Smith Jr., Anthony Yarde's promoter Frank Warren claimed that he and Bob Arum had already agreed terms for the two boxers to fight next, likely in London. He expected the WBO to order the fight as a mandatory as Yarde was their number one ranked. Yarde (22–2, 21 KOs) and his team attended Beterbiev vs. Smith Jr. and told reporters, "What I took away from it is what we already know. Beterbiev is a heavy hitter. A strong Russian. The Russian system, they know how to land their punches. He’s 18–0, with 18 KOs. I think it’s an even more exciting matchup." Yarde was previously knocked out in his last attempt at a world title, which saw him taste defeat for the first time against Sergey Kovalev in 2019. Eddie Hearn, who promoted Beterbiev's rival Dmitry Bivol, called the fight a 'mismatch' and referred to Yarde as a domestic level fighter.

The fight was expected to take place on 29 October at The O2 Arena in London, England. Beterbiev withdrew from the bout on 19 August, due to an undisclosed injury and the fight was pushed back to early 2023. Beterbiev's trainer said the injury was not serious and he had minor knee surgery following the Smith Jr. fight. Beterbiev only rested for two weeks before resuming his training. The fight was rescheduled to take place on 28 January 2023. In November, at WBC annual convention, Matchroom Boxing's Kevin Rooney Jr. requested that Callum Smith be named as their mandatory. This request was approved, but would not be called until after the Beterbiev-Yarde fight. On 19 November, Yarde knocked out Stefani Koykov in 3 rounds and a press release was issued announcing Beterbiev vs. Yarde to take place at the OVO Arena Wembley.

During the Fury-Chisora trilogy, Yarde took some advice from unified heavyweight champion Oleksandr Usyk, but never revealed the advice he received. Usyk defeated Beterbiev in the amateurs twice. Once at the 2011 World Championship and again at the 2012 London Olympics. Beterbiev was untroubled and responded to this saying, "I don't know. If it helps him, then good for him. What can Usyk give him?" Beterbiev weighed 174 ½ pounds, and Yarde weighed in at 174 ¼ pounds.

Beterbiev won the fight by an eighth-round stoppage. After hurting Yarde in the seventh round, Beterbiev came out the next round looking for a knockout. He knocked Yarde down with a counter right hook to an attempted uppercut, which dropped Yarde to his hand and knees at the midway point of the round. Although referee Steve Gray allowed the bout to continue, the corner of Yarde threw in the towel a few seconds later. The time of stoppage was 2:01 of the round. Beterbiev was down 68–65 and 67–66 on two of the judges' scorecards at the time of the stoppage. Bivol out-landed Yarde 135 to 111 in total punches and 84 to 75 in power punches at the time off stoppage.

Arum praised the fight, calling it 'one of the great light heavyweight battles' he had ever seen. Speaking after the fight, Beterbiev said, "I want Bivol. Right now, it’s everything. "In that fight, we’ll have four belts. It’s really good fight, I think." Beterbiev would still need to manoeuvre around his mandatories. Beterbiev praised Yarde. He acknowledged his power and believed he still had time to grow in the support and become successful. Beterbiev was only getting started by the time the eighth round came. He did not do the best job in attempting to avoid Yarde's punches. This is what made it a great fight.

==== Beterbiev vs. Smith ====
The WBC blocked Russian and Belarusian boxers from fighting for their title. This was due to the ongoing Ukraine-Russia conflict. It meant Bivol would not be sanctioned to fight for the undisputed title if a fight with Beterbiev was made. WBC President Mauricio Sulaiman stated this stance was not personal against Bivol. This was a response to Bivol when he said he should be afforded a fair shake as he only resided in Russia for only four of the last 12 months.

On 15 March 2023, Beterbiev was ordered by the WBC to make a mandatory title defense against the former WBA super middleweight champion Callum Smith (29–1, 21 KOs). As the pair failed to come to terms, a purse bid was called, which was won by Top Rank with a $2,115,000 bid. As the champion, Beterbiev was guaranteed a 70/30% split in his favor, which would earned him a guaranteed $1,330,000, with 10% of the initial sum being set aside for the winner. Smith would walk away with a $571,000 purse. Matchroom Boxing also made a bid, which was $15,000 less than Top Rank's winning bid. Hearn was devastated about losing the bid by such a small margin. He said "I am gutted. Everyone has said they must have known what our bid was to only beat it by that much but in reality when there have been offers made throughout a period of negotiation you know roughly what the other side’s bid will be". The bout was expected to take place in Montreal.

The bout was expected to take place on 19 August at the Videotron Centre in Québec City, Canada. It was to be broadcast in the US on ESPN and Sky Sports in the UK. Beterbiev had not fought in Québec City since 2015. The fight was postponed on 30 July, as Beterbiev was forced to undergo jaw surgery due to a bone infection. The event was rescheduled to take place on 13 January 2024, at the same venue.

Controversy followed in December 2023, when VADA results from urine and blood tests taken from Beterbiev showed "elevated levels of HGH and testosterone". The findings were atypical and not adverse, which meant the fight would still take place. Hearn did not accuse Beterbiev, but wanted more information as to these raised levels, as further testing, also done by VADA showed Beterbiev had normal levels. His trainer Marc Ramsey called Hearn a hypocrite. He went on to say that there was no positive test, or the fight would be cancelled. Beterbiev was tested three times after the atypical findings, with all tests coming through negative. The WBC explained their stance on the findings,

In response to the atypical findings, VADA immediately ordered additional anti-doping tests on Champion Beterbiev. To that end, VADA caused samples to be collected from Champion Beterbiev on December 15, 2023 (urine), December 21, 2023 (blood and urine), and then again on January 3, 2024 (blood). All of those samples yielded absolutely negative results. Matchroom, Top Rank, the Quebec Commission, all sanctioning bodies involved (WBC, IBF, and WBO), and the Association of Boxing Commissions (ABC) received notifications of all the results of anti-doping test Champion Beterbiev has taken, and therefore of all follow up procedures.

Beterbiev was a 4–1 favorite to win. He weighed in at the 175 pound limit and Smith weighed 174.6 pounds.

In front of 10,031 fans in attendance, Beterbiev won the fight by a seventh-round technical knockout. He was ahead 58–56, 58–56, and 59–55 on the scorecards at the time of the stoppage. Beterbiev dominated throughout the fight. In round 5, Smith was hit with hard jabs. In the sixth, Beterbiev continued to land on Smith, which caused swelling around both eyes. The end came in round 7, after Beterbiev dropped Smith following several punches. This was the first time Smith had been dropped as a professional. He got up at the 8-count and continued, only to be hit with more shots to the chin, dropping him a second time. Buddy McGirt then stepped up on the apron to halt the contest. Compubox showed Beterbiev was more busy and accurate, landing 182 of 471 punches thrown (38.6%), whilst Smith landed 59 of his 366 thrown (16.1%). Beterbiev landed 95 jabs. According to Nielsen Media Research, the fight averaged 691,000 viewers and peaked at 793,000 viewers.

After the fight, Smith said, "No excuses. The better man won tonight. My performance wasn’t the best, but he’s a good champion. He turns up. He’s done what he’s meant to do." Smith also said he didn't feel Beterbiev's power until he was stopped.

=== Undisputed light heavyweight championship ===
==== Beterbiev vs. Bivol ====
Beterbiev was expected to face the WBA light heavyweight champion Dmitry Bivol for the undisputed title on 1 June 2024. Beterbiev was forced to withdraw from the fight on 3 May, after suffering a ruptured meniscus in training. Malik Zinad was selected to fill in for Beterbiev against Bivol on 1 June, with Beterbiev and Bivol intending to meet should Bivol beat Zinad.

Following Bivol's title defence against Zinad, Turki Alalshikh announced the undisputed fight would take place on 12 October at the Kingdom Arena in Riyadh, Saudi Arabia.

The fight was described as a tactical chess match. Bivol began the fight behind a strong jab. Beterbiev struggled with Bivol's hand speed earlier on, but was able to get through his guard many times. Bivol was landing combinations, Beterbiev was coming forward and landing one punch at a time. The tide changed slightly in fifth round which saw Beterbiev getting the better of Bivol, landing his own combinations and in the next round he connected with a body shot. Bivol stood toe-to-toe with Beterbiev in round seven, at one point landing five unanswered punches. Beterbiev began switching stances depending on Bivol's movements. Bivol's eye began to swell in round 8 and he spent most of round 9 moving around avoiding Beterbiev's power. The boxers began to clinch in round 10. Referee Taylor warned Bivol in round 11, for pushing Beterbiev's head down. Beterbiev finished the fight stronger.

Bivol and Beterbiev went all 12 rounds making Bivol the first fighter to go the distance with Beterbiev. Beterbiev won by majority decision to unify the titles, as one judge scored it 114–114, and the other two judges gave the fight to Beterbiev with scores of 115–113 and 116–112. Beterbiev became the first undisputed light heavyweight champion in 22 years. It was reported that they both took home a $10 million purse for the fight.

After the fight, Bivol’s team stated that they wanted an immediate rematch, and Beterbiev’s team stated that they were happy to do it.

Many believed Bivol did enough to win, but understood it was a razor-close fight. Speaking on the win, Beterbiev said, "Of course it's a tough fight because Dmitri is a champion, too. He has good skills, maybe better than me. But today, Allah chose me." Bivol felt he could have done more and promised to do more in the rematch. He said, "I did my job. I felt that I could do better. ... He is powerful, very powerful. And you see I have a bruise from my hand. He always beat it and it was so hard, even he reached my eye."

According to Compubox stats, Beterbiev landed 137 of 682 punches thrown (20%) and Bivol landed 142 of his 423 thrown (33.6%). Of the 12 rounds, ten of them were scored identically by the judges.

Amongst those that were unhappy with the decision was Bivol's promoter Eddie Hearn. He, along with others, branded the 116–112 scorecard too wide and said the judge "should never work in the sport again," referring to Polish judge Pawel Kardyni. A week later, Bivol and his team filed a protest with all four sanctioning bodies. His team knew the decision would not be overturned, but rather it was done to help force an immediate rematch.

On 17 October, the IBF ordered Beterbiev to make a mandatory defence against Michael Eifert (13–1, 5 KOs). Angry fans took to social media to voice their disappointment of the news as it would jeopardise a rematch between Bivol and Beterbiev to have all four titles on the line. Bob Arum was also frustrated with the mandatory order. He told a reporter, "It’s totally insane. It’s like a burden to be undisputed. I mean, the idea that you have to fight some non-entity to keep your title after you’ve won the biggest fight of your career seems crazy to me. This is ludicrous. They say, ‘These are our rules.’ Well, change the rules." Arum only wanted Beterbiev to have big fights.

==== Beterbiev vs. Bivol II ====
On 2 December the rematch between Beterbiev and Bivol for the undisputed light heavyweight title was announced as the main event for a 22 February card to close Riyadh Season. This was considered a quick turnaround and would leave a gap of only four months between the two fights.

Bivol re-iterated what he said after the first fight, that he would increase his endurance and throw more punches, staying busy throughout the fight. Beterbiev said they both know each other in the ring, but assumed Bivol would have a different game plan heading into the rematch. The IBF granted an exemption for the fight to take place ahead of a mandatory defence against Eifert.

Beterbiev weighed 175 pounds and Bivol weighed 174.1 pounds. The event took place in a smaller venue, the ANB Arena in Riyadh, in front of 7,000 fans. In another tactical fight, Bivol put on a skilful performance and gained revenge on Beterbiev via majority decision. One judge scored bout 114–114, with the other two judges scoring 116–112 and 115–113 for Bivol to crown him the undisputed champion, He also won the Ring Magazine belt and handed Beterbiev his first career loss. Bivol was more relaxed and showed more patience in the rematch. Bivol used combinations, superior hand speed and movement to win. Beterbiev wasn't able to cut off the ring well enough this time but had his moments, landing hard shots when in range. Bivol established his jab earlier on to counter Beterbiev. From the third round Beterbiev looked to take over. Bivol's output reduced and Beterbiev was able to out-land him. This changed after the seventh round. Beterbiev's pace slowed down and Bivol began to use his movement and circle around, landing crisp combinations. In the tenth, Beterbiev did the better work, until Bivol landed some combinations to end the round strong. Before the final round, Beterbiev's corner told him he needed to win the round for any chance to win the fight. He stalked Bivol managed to open up a cut on Bivol’s left eyebrow. Interestingly, the three scorecards were identical to the scores in the first fight.

After the fight Bivol said, "I'm just so happy. I went through a lot the last year and this is so exciting. I was better, I was pushing myself more. I was more confident, I was lighter. I just wanted to win so much today." Beterbiev responded to the outcome stating "I don't want to talk about the decision, I just want to say congrats to Bivol. I think this fight was better than the first fight but now it's my time to come back", leading to speculation there will be a trilogy fight. Compubox showed a significant change in output for Bivol compared to the first bout. He was credited in landing 170 of 574 punches thrown (31.1%), while Beterbiev landed 121 of his 688 thrown (17.6%). Bivol landed more than Beterbiev in 9 of the 12 rounds.

Talks emerged for a trilogy. Both Bivol and Beterbiev were also open to the idea. The gap between the fights was not expected to be as short this time. Former HBO Boxing commentator Jim Lampley was also high on praise for the bout. He said, "People ask me, ‘Does it rise to the level of Gatti-Ward and Barrera-Morales in terms of the intensity of the combat? I say yes." On a possible trilogy, Lampley was open to idea, but said it didn't need to happen next. Some media outlets also stated it wouldn't be a bad idea if Bivol defended his titles against a top contender next. Hearn went on record to say the rematch was the best fight he had seen live. He also felt, Bivol would win the trilogy more convincingly, if it happened.

=== Road to redemption ===
In July 2025, it was reported that both Bivol and Beterbiev asked Turki Alalshikh if the trilogy could be held in Russia with different organizers, to which he gave his blessing. Sources indicated that the boxers had been presented with a lucrative proposal from an event organizer. Beterbiev later posted his frustrations on Instagram about the delay in the trilogy fight. On 6 August, it was revealed that Beterbiev would return to the ring on 22 November 2025, as part of the "Ring IV: Night of the Champions" undercard. He was set to face American boxer Deon Nicholson (22–1, 18 KOs), who had been on an eight-fight winning streak, most recently achieving a fourth-round stoppage victory over Devonte Williams in June 2025. The card was planned to be held in Riyadh. Beterbiev placed the responsibility on Bivol for the absence of a trilogy. He said, “We were offered great conditions, which were almost impossible to refuse. For my part, I did everything to make the third fight happen, but my opponent chose the path of retreat again. I’ve waited long enough and I don’t intend to wait any longer." On October 10, Nicholson announced the cancellation of the fight via social media. He expressed his disappointment regarding the situation and indicated that he would soon provide updates on future fights. No specific reason for the cancellation was disclosed.

In November, Beterbiev posted on his social media: “I’m grateful for all these years with Top Rank and want to thank them for the opportunities they gave me. I want everyone, who follows and supports me, to know that I believe – the best fights are ahead.” It was later confirmed by Top Rank that Beterbiev's contract was not renewed in June 2025, thus making him a free agent.

== Personal life ==
Beterbiev was born in Khasavyurt, Dagestan, and is of Chechen descent.

He currently resides in Montreal, Quebec and is a Canadian citizen. Beterbiev is a Muslim. He is married and has four children. In October 2024, following his win over Dmitry Bivol, Beterbiev was made an honorary citizen of the Chechen Republic by the Head of the Chechen Republic, Ramzan Kadyrov.

== Legal matters ==
Beterbiev was formerly promoted by Yvon Michel. After lengthy legal proceedings, which Beterbiev lost in 2018, he was ruled under contract to Michel until 2021. Beterbiev appealed, arguing his contract with Michel had expired in March 2017, then agreed to an out-of-court settlement with Michel. His original 2013 contract had been extended to 2015. A judge ruled that a promised purse, which Beterbiev stated was not completely paid by the following March, over a December 2015 bout with Isidro Prieto, and the fact that Beterbiev agreed to a process of elimination bouts to secure the International Boxing Federation World Light Heavyweight title, despite a four-bout-a-year contractual agreement, did not cause any prejudice to his career. Beterbiev's legal battle kept him relatively inactive, fighting only once in 2017 and 2018, until his contractual dispute was resolved.

"We are proud of the work we have done with Artur during our association, and we wish him the best success in the pursuit of his career", said promoter Yvon Michel after the settlement agreement.

"I am relieved, and happy to now be able to focus one hundred percent on my training and my performances in the ring", said Beterbiev. "I want to thank Yvon and all members of the GYM team for their efforts, and support in developing my career since arriving in Canada in 2013". Beterbiev had entered into new a co-promotional agreement with Eddie Hearn and Matchroom Boxing. However, after one fight under the Eddie Hearn arrangement, Beterbiev left Hearn, and subsequently signed to Top Rank and ESPN.

== Professional boxing record ==
22 fights	21 wins	1 loss
By knockout	20	0
By decision	1	1

No.	Result	Record	Opponent	Type	Round, time	Date	Location	Notes
22	Loss	21–1	Dmitry Bivol	MD	12	22 Feb 2025	The Venue Riyadh Season, Riyadh, Saudi Arabia	Lost WBA (Super), WBC, IBF, WBO, IBO, and The Ring light-heavyweight titles
21	Win	21–0	Dmitry Bivol	MD	12	12 Oct 2024	Kingdom Arena, Riyadh, Saudi Arabia	Retained WBC, IBF, and WBO light-heavyweight titles; Won WBA (Super), IBO, and vacant The Ring light-heavyweight titles
20	Win	20–0	Callum Smith	TKO	7 (12), 2:00	13 Jan 2024	Videotron Centre, Quebec City, Canada	Retained WBC, IBF, and WBO light-heavyweight titles
19	Win	19–0	Anthony Yarde	TKO	8 (12), 2:01	28 Jan 2023	OVO Arena Wembley, London, England	Retained WBC, IBF, and WBO light-heavyweight titles
18	Win	18–0	Joe Smith Jr.	TKO	2 (12), 2:19	18 Jun 2022	Hulu Theater, New York City, New York, U.S.	Retained WBC and IBF light-heavyweight titles; Won WBO light-heavyweight title
17	Win	17–0	Marcus Browne	KO	9 (12), 0:46	17 Dec 2021	Bell Centre, Montreal, Quebec, Canada	Retained WBC and IBF light-heavyweight titles
16	Win	16–0	Adam Deines	TKO	10 (12), 1:30	20 Mar 2021	Khodynka Ice Palace, Moscow, Russia	Retained WBC and IBF light-heavyweight titles
15	Win	15–0	Oleksandr Gvozdyk	TKO	10 (12), 2:49	18 Oct 2019	Liacouras Center, Philadelphia, Pennsylvania, U.S.	Retained IBF light-heavyweight title; Won WBC light-heavyweight title
14	Win	14–0	Radivoje Kalajdzic	KO	5 (12), 0:13	4 May 2019	Stockton Arena, Stockton, California, U.S.	Retained IBF light-heavyweight title
13	Win	13–0	Callum Johnson	KO	4 (12), 2:36	6 Oct 2018	Wintrust Arena, Chicago, Illinois, U.S.	Retained IBF light-heavyweight title
12	Win	12–0	Enrico Kölling	KO	12 (12), 2:33	11 Nov 2017	Save Mart Arena, Fresno, California, U.S.	Won vacant IBF light-heavyweight title
11	Win	11–0	Isidro Ranoni Prieto	TKO	1 (12), 2:44	23 Dec 2016	Casino du Lac-Leamy, Gatineau, Quebec, Canada	Retained NABA light-heavyweight title
10	Win	10–0	Ezequiel Maderna	TKO	4 (12), 0:54	4 Jun 2016	Bell Centre, Montreal, Quebec, Canada	Retained NABA light-heavyweight title
9	Win	9–0	Alexander Johnson	TKO	7 (10), 1:38	12 Jun 2015	UIC Pavilion, Chicago, Illinois, U.S.	Retained NABA light-heavyweight title; Won vacant WBO International light-heavyweight title
8	Win	8–0	Gabriel Campillo	KO	4 (12), 0:37	4 Apr 2015	Colisée Pepsi, Quebec City, Quebec, Canada	Retained IBF North American light-heavyweight title
7	Win	7–0	Jeff Page Jr.	TKO	2 (10), 2:21	19 Dec 2014	Colisée Pepsi, Quebec City, Quebec, Canada	Retained NABA light heavyweight title; Won vacant IBF North American and NABO light-heavyweight titles
6	Win	6–0	Tavoris Cloud	KO	2 (12), 0:38	27 Sep 2014	Bell Centre, Montreal, Quebec, Canada	Won vacant NABA light-heavyweight title
5	Win	5–0	Alvaro Enriquez	TKO	1 (6), 2:38	22 Aug 2014	Complexe Sportif Sportscene, Montreal, Quebec, Canada	
4	Win	4–0	Gabriel Lecrosnier	TKO	4 (6), 2:44	18 Jan 2014	Bell Centre, Montreal, Quebec, Canada	
3	Win	3–0	Billy Bailey	KO	1 (6), 2:49	30 Nov 2013	Colisée Pepsi, Quebec City, Quebec, Canada	
2	Win	2–0	Rayco Saunders	RTD	3 (6), 3:00	28 Sep 2013	Bell Centre, Montreal, Quebec, Canada	
1	Win	1–0	Christian Cruz	TKO	2 (4), 2:21	8 Jun 2013	Bell Centre, Montreal, Quebec, Canada	

== Pay-per-view bouts ==
Date	Fight	Billing	Buys	Network	Revenue
22 February 2025	Beterbiev vs. Bivol 2	The Last Crescendo	340,000	DAZN	$7,818.300

== Titles in boxing ==
=== Major world titles ===
- WBA (Super) light-heavyweight champion (175 lbs)
- WBC light-heavyweight champion (175 lbs)
- IBF light-heavyweight champion (175 lbs)
- WBO light-heavyweight champion (175 lbs)

=== The Ring magazine titles ===
- The Ring light-heavyweight champion (175 lbs)

=== Minor world titles ===
- IBO light-heavyweight champion (175 lbs)

=== Regional/International titles ===
- IBF North American light-heavyweight champion (175 lbs)
- WBO International light-heavyweight champion (175 lbs)
- NABA light-heavyweight champion (175 lbs)
- NABO light-heavyweight champion (175 lbs)

=== Undisputed titles ===
- Undisputed light-heavyweight champion

=== Honorary titles ===
- Riyadh Season Undisputed light-heavyweight champion

== Boxing awards ==
- Sports Illustrated Fight of the Year vs. Dmitry Bivol II (2025)
- WBN Fight of the Year vs. Dmitry Bivol II (2025)

== See also ==
- List of male boxers
- List of world light-heavyweight boxing champions
- List of undisputed world boxing champions
- List of WBA world champions
- List of WBC world champions
- List of IBF world champions
- List of WBO world champions
- List of IBO world champions
- List of The Ring world champions

== Notes ==
Sporting positions
Regional boxing titles
Vacant Title last held by Eleider Álvarez	NABA light-heavyweight champion 27 September 2014 – November 2017; Vacated	Vacant Title next held by Charles Foster
Vacant Title last held by Grzegorz Soszyński	IBF North American light-heavyweight champion 19 December 2014 – 11 November 2017; Won world title	Vacant Title next held by Umar Salamov
Vacant Title last held by Gabriel Campillo	NABO light-heavyweight champion 19 December 2014 – June 2015; Vacated	Vacant Title next held by Sean Monaghan
Vacant Title last held by Robin Krasniqi	WBO International light-heavyweight champion 12 June 2015 – June 2016; Vacated	Vacant Title next held by Andre Ward
Minor world boxing titles
Preceded by Dmitry Bivol	IBO light-heavyweight champion 12 October 2024 – 22 February 2025	Next: Dmitry Bivol
Major world boxing titles
Vacant Title last held by Andre Ward	IBF light-heavyweight champion 11 November 2017 – 22 February 2025	Succeeded by Dmitry Bivol
Preceded by Oleksandr Gvozdyk	WBC light-heavyweight champion 18 October 2019 – 22 February 2025	Succeeded by Dmitry Bivol
Preceded by Joe Smith Jr.	WBO light-heavyweight champion 18 June 2022 – 22 February 2025	Succeeded by Dmitry Bivol
Preceded by Dmitry Bivol	WBA light-heavyweight champion Super title 12 October 2024 – 22 February 2025	Succeeded by Dmitry Bivol
Vacant Title last held by Andre Ward	The Ring light-heavyweight champion 12 October 2024 – 22 February 2025	Succeeded by Dmitry Bivol
Vacant Title last held by Roy Jones Jr.	Undisputed light-heavyweight champion 12 October 2024 – 22 February 2025	Succeeded by Dmitry Bivol
