= Vatan Huseynli =

Azerbaijani boxer

Vatan Huseynli (Azerbaijani: Vatan Hüseynli) is an Azerbaijani boxer. At the 2012 Summer Olympics, he competed in the Men's light heavyweight, but was defeated in the first round. According to BBC, Huseynli was 1.85m tall and weighed 81 kg as of August 13, 2012.
