= Boško Drašković =

Montenegrin boxer

Boško DraškovićTrener BK Niksic (4 January 1987, Nikšić, Montenegro) is a Montenegrin boxer. At the 2012 Summer Olympics, he competed in the Men's light heavyweight, but was defeated by Osmar Bravo of Nicaragua in the first round.

Drašković won a gold medal at the Mediterranean Games in Pescara (Italy) in 2009.
