= Dinesh Kumar (boxer) =

Indian boxer

Personal information
- Born: 25 August 1988 (age 37) Bhiwani, Haryana, India
Medal record
Men's boxing
Representing India
Asian Games
Silver medal – second place	2010 Guangzhou	Light heavyweight

Dinesh Kumar (born 25 August 1988) is an Indian amateur boxer from Bhiwani, Haryana who competed at the 2008 Olympics at light-heavyweight. He is coached by Jagdish Singh.

At the first Olympic qualifier he lost to Zhang Xiaoping 7:25, at the second he KOd two fighters to qualify even though he lost the final to Mehdi Ghorbani. In Beijing he lost his first bout against Algerian Abdelhafid Benchabla.
