= Jeysson Monroy =

Colombian boxer (born 1985)

Jeysson
Personal information
- Nickname: Jey
- Nationality: Colombian
- Born: Jeysson Monroy Varela; March 14, 1985 (age 40) Medellín, Antioquia, Colombia
- Height: 6 ft 1 in (1.85 m)
- Weight: Light heavyweight

Boxing career

Jeysson Monroy Varela (born March 14, 1985) is a Colombian professional boxer, model, and actor. At the 2012 Summer Olympics, he competed in the Men's light heavyweight, but was defeated in the first round by Boško Drašković of Montenegro. Jeysson plans to be a professional boxer by 2016. He is part of the cast of the Colombian reality TV show Desafío 2016: Súper Humanos

He was born in Medellín, Colombia but raised in Bogotá. He began his career at the age of 14 but it was not until he turned 18 that he decided to dedicate his life to boxing. He has represented Colombia in many national and international competitions such as WSB, the National Games of Colombia and the Pan American Games. He has been boxing national champion of Colombia 12 times in total. He obtained second place in the National Games in 2004 and later obtained first place in 2007 and 2008. In 2010 and 2011, he won the Central American and South American Games. Finally in 2015 he won a gold medal for his participation in the 2015 National Games of Colombia.
