= Elshod Rasulov =

Uzbekistani boxer (born 1986)

Personal information
- Full name: Эльшод Расулов
- Nationality: Uzbekistan
- Born: March 7, 1986 (age 40) Kokand, Uzbek SSR, Soviet Union
- Height: 1.80 m (5 ft 11 in)
- Weight: 75 kg (165 lb)

Sport
- Sport: Boxing
- Weight class: Light Heavyweight
Medal record
World Amateur Championships
Silver medal – second place	2009 Milan	Light Heavyweight
Bronze medal – third place	2011 Baku	Light heavyweight
Bronze medal – third place	2015 Doha	Light heavyweight
World Military Boxing Championship
Silver medal – second place	2004 Fort Huachuca	69 kg
Asian Games
Gold medal – first place	2006 Doha	Middleweight
Gold medal – first place	2010 Guangzhou	Light Heavyweight
Asian Championships
Gold medal – first place	2007 Ulan Bator	Middleweight

Elshod Rasulov (born March 7, 1986) is an amateur boxer from Uzbekistan, who won gold at the 2006 Asian Games and at the 2010 Asian Games and silver at 2009 World Amateur Boxing Championships.

== Career ==
In 2004 the southpaw counterpuncher knocked out Emilio Correa in the welterweight finals of the 13th World Junior Championships in Jeju then he moved up to middleweight.

That year, he won the silver medal at the 48th World Military Boxing Championship in the 69 kg weight class. The gold was won by Boyd Melson of the US.

At the Chemiepokal 2006 he beat Sergiy Derevyanchenko (UKR) but lost to world #1 Matvey Korobov. In Doha at the 2006 Asian Games he won the final bout against Kazakhstan's Olympic welterweight champion Bakhtiyar Artayev 32–22.

At the 2007 World Championships he lost by knock out to Argenis Casimiro Núñez and didn't medal.

He qualified for the 2008 Olympics by defeating two unknown opponents from Syria and Japan even though he was KOd in one round by Thai Angkhan Chomphuphuang at the qualifier. In Beijing he beat Jean-Mickaël Raymond and Andranik Hakobyan, but lost to old foe Emilio Correa. Afterwards he moved up to light heavy.

At the 2009 World Amateur Boxing Championships he beat Abdelkader Bouhenia (FRA) in the semis, then lost to Artur Beterbiyev.

At the 2010 Asian Games he won again.

At the 2011 World Amateur Boxing Championships he lost to Adilbek Niyazymbetov (KAZ) and won Bronze.

At the 2012 Olympics (results) he defeated Yahia El-Mekachari then lost to Russian favorite Egor Mekhontsev 15:19.

Olympic Games
Preceded by Dilshod Mahmudov	Flagbearer for Uzbekistan; London 2012	Succeeded by Bakhodir Jalolov
