= Eleider Álvarez =

Colombian boxer (born 1984)

Personal information
- Nickname: Storm
- Nationality: Colombian
- Born: Eléider Álvarez Baytar; 8 April 1984 (age 42) Apartadó, Colombia
- Height: 6 ft 0 in (183 cm)
- Weight: Light-heavyweight

Boxing career
- Reach: 75 1/2 in (192 cm)
- Stance: Orthodox

Boxing record
- Total fights: 27
- Wins: 25
- Win by KO: 13
- Losses: 2
Medal record
Men's amateur boxing
Representing Colombia
Pan American Games
Gold medal – first place	2007 Rio	Light-heavyweight
South American Games
Gold medal – first place	2006 Buenos Aires	Light-heavyweight

Eléider Álvarez Baytar (born 8 April 1984) is a Colombian professional boxer who held the WBO light-heavyweight title from 2018 to 2019. As an amateur he won a gold medal at the 2007 Pan American Games in the light-heavyweight division.

== Early life ==
Alvarez was born in Apartadó, Colombia. At a very young age, Alvarez was interested in music and boxing. His mother wanted him to box full-time. His mother died when Alvarez was only 14 years old. It was then Alvarez decided to start a career in boxing.

== Amateur career ==
Álvarez won the 2006 South America Games against Hamilton Ventura.

At the PanAms 2007 he beat southpaw Julio Castillo 10:8 and upset Cuban favorite Yusiel Napoles in the final by KO in round 3. He was trailing 4:6.

At the 2007 World Championships he lost to African champion Ramadan Yasser.

At the first Olympic qualifying tournament for the Americas in Trinidad he was beaten by 18-year-old Cuban Julio César la Cruz 0:8. At the second Olympic qualifying tournament for the Americas in Guatemala he squeaked by the same opponent with an 8:8 countback win, then beat old foe Julio Castillo 4:0 and Azea Austinama to win his Olympic ticket. In the final he also defeated fellow qualifier Julius Jackson.

At the 2008 Pan American Championships in Ecuador he won gold.

Based on his qualifying results he was given a first round bye in the 2008 Olympics, but after a 5–5 tie at the end of his second round bout with Britain's Tony Jeffries (eventual bronze medalist), Álvarez lost on countback.

== Professional career ==
=== Early career ===
Álvarez made his debut at the age of 25 on 28 August 2009 against Jesse Sanders (14–6–2, 13 KOs) at the Montreal Casino. Sanders was a late replacement for Kareem Chartrand. Joachim Alcine and David Lemieux also appeared on the card in separate bouts. Álvarez won the fight via knockout in round 1. This was Sanders' last professional bout. Álvarez fought twice more in 2009 at the Montreal Casino, closing the year with a record of (3–0, 2 KOs). Álvarez did not fight in 2010 due to VISA issues and went back to Colombia. He returned to the ring in April 2011 knocking Ernesto Zamora out after knocking him down 3 times. Álvarez fought for his first title, the vacant WBO NABO light heavyweight title in just his sixth professional fight against Emiliano Cayetano (21–3, 12 KOs) at the Bell Centre in Montreal on 10 December 2011. Cayetano was knocked down three times in round 1, before the fight was stopped at 2 minutes, 33 seconds. In April 2012, he knocked out Rayco Saunders before defending his WBO NABO title against future world title challenger Shawn Hawk (23–1–1, 17 KOs) at the Bell Centre on June 8. Álvarez knocked Hawk down in round 12 and won via wide scorecards of 119–108,119-108, 118–109. This was the first time Álvarez was taken the 12 round distance in his professional career. Álvarez was due to defend his WBO NABO title against veteran boxer Edison Miranda on 14 December 2012 at the Bell Centre, however Miranda dropped out of the fight and instead Álvarez fought Danny McIntosh, who he knocked out in 8 rounds of the scheduled 10. Álvarez knocked McIntosh down twice in round 8, with the finishing shot being a right hand.

In February 2013, Promoter Yvon Michel confirmed that Álvarez would returning to the Bell Centre on the undercard of Adonis Stevenson vs. Darnell Boone II on 22 March. Veteran boxer Nicholson Poulard (19–3, 9 KOs) was announced as his opponent and it was announced that the WBA NABA light heavyweight title would be at stake. Poulard, known for being the brother of former world champion Jean Pascal, was on a 6-fight win streak going into the bout. Álvarez stopped Poulard in round 3 with a single combination. Poulard collapsed to the canvas though he managed to get up on his feet, it was not enough to convince referee Marlon Wright, who waved off the fight at the 2:08 mark in the third. On 25 March, Álvarez's manager Greg Leon stated it was likely he fight Allan Green (32–4, 22 KOs) on the Lucian Bute vs. Jean Pascal undercard on 25 May in a WBA eliminator at the Bell Centre in Montreal. On 12 June, Curtis "50 Cent" Jackson announced his company, SMS Promotions would promote a card at the Connecticut Convention Center in Hartford on July 5 live on ESPN Friday Night Fights. Álvarez vs. Green was to headline the card. The fight was to be fought at a 180-pound catchweight, however Green weighed 186 pounds. Álvarez came in much lighter at 178 pounds. For the fight to go ahead, Green had to pay Álvarez 20% of his purse, which worked out to be $3,000. Green withdrew from the bout the next morning claiming he had food poisoning. Álvarez eventually fought his toughest fight against Edison Miranda (35–8, 30 KO's) on the Stevenson-Cloud undercard on 28 September at the Bell Centre. The bout the scheduled for 10 rounds. After controlling the fight from the start, Álvarez dropped Miranda after landing a right hand. Miranda beat the count and with Álvarez trying to finish the fight, Miranda made it to end of the round. The fight went the distance with Álvarez winning 95–94, 99–90, 97–92 on the judges' scorecards.

In January 2014, Álvarez defeated then-unbeaten Canadian boxer Andrew Gardiner via unanimous decision, then returned to the ring in May, going the distance for the third consecutive time, this time against Alexander Johnson. Álvarez was originally due to fight South African contender Thomas Oosthuizen for the vacant WBC Silver light heavyweight title in January instead of Gardiner. The WBA declined to sanction the bout. A week before the bout, Oosthuizen was pulled from the bout and reportedly dropped by his promotional team Golden Gloves. Their website stated Oosthuizen had been involved in a motorcycle accident and injured. It was also reported he was 12 pounds over the light heavyweight limit at the time. After being lightly linked to a fight with Dmitry Sukhotsky (21–2, 16 KOs) in July, it was announced it August that Álvarez would fight on Golden Gloves promoted card, headlined by British boxer Martin Murray at the Salle des Étoiles in Monte Carlo on 25 October 2014. He challenged Ryno Liebenberg (16–0, 11 KOs) for his WBC Silver title. Álvarez won the belt scoring a round 7 stoppage. Álvarez used the first 2 rounds to test Liebenberg's shots. In round 4, Álvarez started landed more shots clean. Under the WBC rules of open scoring, the judges scorecards read 39-37 (twice - for Álvarez) and 38–38 after 4 rounds. Liebenberg was cut due to an accidental headbutt and then deducted a point under the WBC regulations. When the fight resumed, Álvarez landed a right uppercut, however Liebenberg survived the round. The cut over Liebenberg's left eye re-opened in round 7 and after advice from the ringside physician, referee Frank Garza stopped the fight at 1 minute, 54 seconds, giving Ávarez the win.

On 11 May 2015 Álvarez was added to the Erislandy Lara vs. Delvin Rodriguez card on 12 June at the UIC Pavilion in Chicago, Illinois. This would mark Álvarez's US debut and was to be broadcast on Spike TV. On 8 June, Groupe Yvon Michel announced that Álvarez, along with stablemates Artur Beterbiev and Oscar Rivas had signed with powerful American adviser Al Haymon. Álvarez fought Anatoliy Dudchenko (19–3, 13 KOs) and knocked him out in 2 rounds after landing a hard combination. On 15 July, in Montreal, at the press conference of Lucian Bute vs. Andrea Di Luisa, it was confirmed that Álvarez would fight unbeaten Paraguayan Isidro Ranoni Prieto (24–0–3, 20 KOs). Prieto was ranked #6 by the WBO. The fight would take place on August 15 at the Bell Centre in Montreal. Álvarez won the bout via unanimous decision with all three judges' scoring the bout 117–111 in his favor. After the fight, Álvarez stated, "I was prepared to go 12 rounds. "I didn't want to, I wanted the knockout, but I was ready for a 12-round fight and happy to get the win." There was talks that Álvarez would potentially fight Isaac Chilemba next in a WBC eliminator.

The teams of Álvarez and Chilemba started talks on 26 August 2015 and within a month agreed the terms for their fight, avoiding purse bids. The fight was then announced to take place at the Videotron Centre in Quebec City, Quebec on 28 November on the undercard of newly crowned IBF super middleweight champion James DeGale's first title defence against Lucian Bute. In a close bout, Álvarez defeated Chilemba via majority decision to become the WBC mandatory challenger. One judge scored the bout 114-114, whilst the remaining two judges awarded Álvarez 118-110 and 115–113. Had Chilemba won the final round, the bout would have ended a draw. According to ComputBox stats, Álvarez landed 147 of 544 punches thrown (27%) and Chilemba landed 151 of his 598 thrown (25%). Álvarez believed he was the clear winning having only lost 2 rounds. Chilemba took most of the early rounds and it was not until the later rounds where Chilemba weathered the storm. Chilemba stated that Álvarez, who had mostly fought out of Canada, received a "hometown decision."

=== Career from 2016–2017 ===
Álvarez fought twice in 2016. Initially, he was scheduled to fight former Lineal world champion Chad Dawson in July, however an injury caused Dawson to pull out with only 10 days before the fight. Instead, New Zealand southpaw Robert Berridge (27–4–1, 21 KOs) stepped in to fight Álvarez in a 10-round bout on 29 July at the Videotron Centre. Álvarez, the heavy favourite against the late replacement performed defensively in winning a lop-sided decision. Considering Berridge took the bout on short notice as a replacement for Dawson, he went the distance and gave a good accounting of himself. Berridge took a huge swelling and beating to the right side of his face, and could not penetrate the defensive wall of Álvarez. The scorecards read 99–90, 98–92, 98–92. Álvarez returned to the ring on 10 December, headlining his own card at the Montreal Casino in Quebec against Polish boxer Norbert Dąbrowski (19–5–1, 7 KOs). Dąbrowski came into the bout having never been stopped. Álvarez was unable to stop Dąbrowki, who proved to be a tough opponent, however won a wide unanimous decision with the scores of 97–93, 98–92, 99–91.

On 6 December 2016 prior to defeating Dąbrowki, a bout with former IBF super middleweight champion Lucian Bute (32–3–1, 25 KOs) was in the works to take place on 25 February 2017 in Quebec. Promoter Yvon Michel explained the reason for the bout was due to the fallout of the potential rematch between Bute and Jean Pascal. Álvarez knocked out Bute in round 5 to remain the mandatory challenger for the WBC title. Both fighters had their moments in the first four rounds, but it was a right hand which buzzed Bute. He was then immediately dropped with another right hand. Marlon B. Wright, who refereed his last bout, stopped the fight at 2:22 of round 5. An accidental clash of heads at the end of round 2 opened a cut on Bute's nose and Álvarez was cut on his forehead. Bute suffered his 4th loss over his last 7 fights.

==== Álvarez vs. Pascal ====
On 15 April 2017, it was announced that Álvarez would defend the WBC Silver light heavyweight title against Haitian Jean Pascal on the undercard of Adonis Stevenson's world title defense against Fonfara at the Centre Bell in Montreal, Canada on 3 June 2017. Álvarez was due to fight Stevenson next for the WBC world title, but took money to step aside. The event was scheduled to be shown live on Showtime and was confirmed on 21 April. Álvarez outboxed Pascal, winning a majority decision after 12 rounds. One judge scored the fight 114-114, whilst the other two scored it 117-111 and 116–112 in favour of Álvarez. Pascal suffered his third defeat in five fights. Álvarez controlled the fight with his superior jab, accuracy and general ring work. Pascal felt he had done enough to get the win and wanted a rematch with Álvarez.

==== Issues with the WBC ====
After Badou Jack (21–1–3, 13 KOs) defeated Nathan Cleverly in August 2017, to win the WBA 'Regular' light heavyweight title, he began to call out WBC champion Adonis Stevenson, knowing that Stevenson had a mandatory challenger. Stevenson shrugged it off, claiming he was ready for anyone. On September 8, 2017, mutual promoter Yvon Michel disclosed that there was serious ongoing negotiations between Stevenson and Álvarez to fight before the end on 2017. He revealed the fight would take place in Quebec. In September, Michel said that he had a difficult time finalizing a date and venue for the fight, which meant the fight could get pushed to the end of January 2018. He also responded to claims of Jack wanting to fight Stevenson, saying it would only be possible if it were a unification. Michel confirmed the fight would take place on Showtime in January 2018. Michel spoke to Showtime about not going head to head locally with David Lemieux's next fight, which would take place on 16 December on HBO. On 8 November, there was rumours stating that Stevenson would once again pay Álvarez a step-aside fee, in order to fight Badou Jack. Álvarez spoke to TVA Sports saying, "I do not think I'm going to fight Stevenson. I do expect to receive that (step-aside offer), and then I will analyze it with my team." On 1 December, it was reported that GYM had offered Álvarez a step-aside deal which would give him 'a multi-fight agreement with six-figure guarantee per fight', with Stevenson being part of deal as well. On 6 December, the WBC announced that they would investigate into Stevenson's title reign and lack of mandatories. A week later, the WBC stated they would allow Stevenson to avoid Álvarez once again in order to fight Jack. The WBC went on to state they would order Álvarez to fight Ukrainian boxer Oleksandr Gvozdyk (14–0, 12 KOs) for the interim title. Álvarez withdrew from the fight before the purse bid was scheduled on 12 January. On 11 April, news broke out from Álvarez's manager, Stephane Lepine that a deal was yet to be reached with Álvarez to be properly compensated. Yvon Michel admitted he was working on a deal to keep Álvarez happy and this was the same reason as to why tickets had not yet gone on sale for the Stevenson-Jack fight, which was a month away.

=== WBO light-heavyweight champion ===
==== Álvarez vs. Kovalev ====
On 18 April 2018 it was announced that a deal had been reached for Álvarez to challenge Sergey Kovalev (32–2–1, 28 KOs) for the WBO light heavyweight title on HBO. Kovalev was originally scheduled to fight contender Marcus Browne in the summer of 2018, however due to having been arrested for domestic violence, Kovalev's promoter, Kathy Duva of Main Events got in contact with Álvarez's manager Lepine about a potential fight. Due to Álvarez fighting Kovalev, this meant the announcement of Stevenson vs. Jack would be imminent. It was announced the fight would take place on 4 August at the Hard Rock Hotel & Casino in Atlantic City, New Jersey. In front of a sold-out crowd of 5,642 at the Estess Aena, Álvarez won the fight via TKO in round 7 to claim the WBO title. Kovalev was knocked down three times in round 7 before the fight was stopped. The official time of stoppage was 2 minutes and 45 seconds. For the first six rounds, Kovalev was in control using his jab and landing his right hand. At the end of round 6, he was leading on the scorecards 59–55, 59-55 and 58–56. Álvarez bided his time waiting to the midpoint of the contest before opening up. He explained that part of the gameplan was to wait for Kovalev to tire. Álvarez first dropped Kovalev with a clean right hand to the head. Kovalev got up, but looked unsteady. Instead of trying to finish the round, he stayed open allowing Álvarez to land jabs and a perfectly timed uppercut. Kovalev was dropped again with a combination of punches. After beating the count again, Álvarez charged forward landing another left-right combination, putting Kovalev down again. Referee David Fields stopped the fight.

After the fight, Duva confirmed there was a rematch clause in the contract, however was unsure if the rematch would take place straight away. Kovalev was taken to hospital as precaution, thanked his fans for their support and hinted retirement. Through a translator, Álvarez said, "Words cannot describe how I feel. I want to thank God and all my fans in Canada and Colombia. This was all for them. It was a two-punch combination [for the final knockdown] that I have been throwing my whole career, and we worked on it in camp. I have always practiced that in camp, and we thought it would work in this camp." CompuBox Stats showed that Kovalev landed 91 punches of 339 thrown (27%) and Álvarez landed 73 of his 251 thrown (29%). The fight averaged 731,000 viewers and peaked at 813,000 viewers.

=== Career from 2019–present ===
==== Álvarez vs. Kovalev II ====
On 25 August, Kovalev said he would exercise the rematch clause. According to the contract, the fight would have had to take place by February 2019. Early talks indicated the rematch would take place in December 2018. A stumbling block appeared when HBO confirmed they were not fully committed to airing a rematch between the two fighters. Duva stated at any point competing networks could bid on the bout, but all HBO would need to do was match the highest bid to broadcast the fight. In September 2018, Duva stated the bout would likely take place towards the end of January 2019 on the East Coast, as it would be a good distance for Canadian fans to drive to. On 14 September, it was announced that ESPN would broadcast the rematch. A week later it was announced the fight would take place on 2 February 2019 at the Ford Center at The Star in Frisco, Texas, best known for being the Dallas Cowboys’ training facility. The first press conference took place on 8 December 2018 officially starting the build up for the rematch.

On 20 December 2018 Álvarez signed a multi-year co-promotional deal with Top Rank, which would see his future bouts televised on ESPN. The contract highlighted, for as many as seven fights, Álvarez would earn seven-figure purses, PPV shares, gate revenue and at least one fight per year in Quebec. Promoter Yvon Michel stated unifications were now more possible than before, apart from a fight with Artur Beterbiev, who Marc Ramsey also trains. He also stated that Al Haymon would still be advising Álvarez and gave them his blessing to take the deal.

In front of 4,877 fans at the Ford Center, Kovalev put on an incredible performance to regain the WBO title after defeating Álvarez by a 12 round unanimous decision and became a three-time light heavyweight titleholder. The judges scored it 120-108, 116-112 and 116-112 for Kovalev. The shutout scorecard seemed exaggerated as Álvarez did do enough to win a few rounds. After round 1, Kovalev settled into the fight, he started using his jab and keeping Álvarez at range. Kovalev looked to tire in rounds 6, 7 and 8, but appeared to get his second wind in the championship rounds, pulling the fight out of reach for Álvarez. After round 10, Álvarez's corner advised him he needed a knockout to win.

After the fight, Kathy Duva of Main Events said, "I'm thrilled. It's sweeter when nobody thinks you can do it." Kovalev hired veteran trainer Buddy McGirt for the bout, ending his 3-fight run with Abror Tursunpulatov. On the loss, Álvarez said, "I have no excuses. I know if it went the distance he would be the favorite so I tried to press the fight. I thought I put on a good performance. I don't see myself as a loser, but I do give him credit. He went out and proved he wanted to win the fight." Kovalev gave his training team credit, "This training camp I had help from my team, Buddy and Teddy. Thank you guys for this. They stopped me from overtraining. I saved my energy and I'm happy. We worked on the jab. Always my jab and right hand." According to CompuBox statistics, Kovalev landed 213 of 816 punches (26%) and Álvarez connected with 111 of his 369 shots (30%).

Following the loss, it was reported that Álvarez's new contract with Top Rank would continue, but with some 'financial consequences'. It was said that Álvarez would not be guaranteed a minimum $250,000 purse, not including any monetary bonuses. The contract stated if Álvarez could recapture a world title, the original terms would be reinstated.

==== Cancelled fight vs Jesse Hart ====
According to The Montreal Journal, Álvarez was due to make his ring return on 28 June 2019 at the Videotron Center in Canada. On 20 March, it was reported that former super middleweight world title challenger Jesse Hart (25–2, 21 KOs) was the leading contender to fight Álvarez. Hart's only concern was the bout taking place in Canada. In April, Álvarez agreed to fight Hart, pending a contract signing. It was reported on 3 May, whilst in training, Álvarez had suffered a torn ligament in his foot, meaning his ring return would be delayed.

==== Álvarez vs Seals ====
In his comeback fight, Alvarez fought Michael Seals on 18 January 2020. Alvarez caught Seals with a big overhand right at the end of the seventh round, from which Seals would not get up.

==== Álvarez vs Smith Jr. ====
On August 22, 2020, Alvarez fought heavy handed Joe Smith Jr. in a WBO title eliminator. Smith Jr boxed well, and took the fight to Alvarez, which culminated in a ninth-round one-punch knockout over Alvarez, who was sent on the canvas below the ropes, and was not able to beat the count.

== Personal life ==
He has one daughter with his wife Jessica, called Ayda Eliza, named after his mother. His family lives in Colombia, whilst Alvarez lives in an apartment in Laval, Quebec. Alvarez sends money to Colombia for his family.

== Professional boxing record ==
27 fights	25 wins	2 losses
By knockout	13	1
By decision	12	1

No.	Result	Record	Opponent	Type	Round, time	Date	Location	Notes
27	Loss	25–2	Joe Smith Jr.	KO	9 (12), 0:26	22 Aug 2020	MGM Grand Conference Center, Paradise, Nevada, U.S.	
26	Win	25–1	Michael Seals	KO	7 (10), 0:05	18 Jan 2020	Turning Stone Resort Casino, Verona, New York, U.S.	For vacant WBC Continental Americas light heavyweight title
25	Loss	24–1	Sergey Kovalev	UD	12	2 Feb 2019	Ford Center at The Star, Frisco, Texas, U.S.	Lost WBO light-heavyweight title
24	Win	24–0	Sergey Kovalev	TKO	7 (12), 2:45	4 Aug 2018	Etess Arena, Atlantic City, New Jersey, U.S.	Won WBO and IBA light-heavyweight titles
23	Win	23–0	Jean Pascal	MD	12	3 Jun 2017	Bell Centre, Montreal, Canada	Retained WBC Silver light-heavyweight title
22	Win	22–0	Lucian Bute	TKO	5 (12), 2:22	24 Feb 2017	Videotron Centre, Quebec City, Canada	Retained WBC Silver light-heavyweight title
21	Win	21–0	Norbert Dąbrowski	UD	10	10 Dec 2016	Montreal Casino, Montreal, Canada	
20	Win	20–0	Robert Berridge	UD	10	29 Jul 2016	Videotron Centre, Quebec City, Canada	
19	Win	19–0	Isaac Chilemba	MD	12	28 Nov 2015	Videotron Centre, Quebec City, Canada	Retained WBC Silver light-heavyweight title
18	Win	18–0	Isidro Ranoni Prieto	UD	12	15 Aug 2015	Bell Centre, Montreal, Canada	Retained WBC Silver light-heavyweight title
17	Win	17–0	Anatoliy Dudchenko	TKO	2 (10), 1:05	12 Jun 2015	UIC Pavilion, Chicago, Illinois, U.S.	
16	Win	16–0	Ryno Liebenberg	TKO	7 (12), 1:52	25 Oct 2014	Salle des Etoiles, Monte Carlo, Monaco	Won WBC Silver light-heavyweight title
15	Win	15–0	Alexander Johnson	UD	10	24 May 2014	Bell Centre, Montreal, Canada	
14	Win	14–0	Andrew Gardiner	UD	10	18 Jan 2014	Bell Centre, Montreal, Canada	
13	Win	13–0	Edison Miranda	UD	10	28 Sep 2013	Bell Centre, Montreal, Canada	
12	Win	12–0	Nicholson Poulard	TKO	3 (12), 2:08	22 Mar 2013	Bell Centre, Montreal, Canada	Retained WBO–NABO light-heavyweight title; Won WBA–NABA light-heavyweight title
11	Win	11–0	Danny McIntosh	KO	8 (10), 2:02	14 Dec 2012	Bell Centre, Montreal, Canada	Retained WBO–NABO light-heavyweight title
10	Win	10–0	Daniel Regi	TKO	2 (8), 2:20	12 Oct 2012	Bell Centre, Montreal, Canada	
9	Win	9–0	Shawn Hawk	UD	12	8 Jun 2012	Bell Centre, Montreal, Canada	Retained WBO–NABO light-heavyweight title
8	Win	8–0	Rayco Saunders	UD	8	20 Apr 2012	Bell Centre, Montreal, Canada	
7	Win	7–0	Emiliano Cayetano	KO	1 (12), 2:33	10 Dec 2011	Bell Centre, Montreal, Canada	Won vacant WBO–NABO light-heavyweight title
6	Win	6–0	Michael Walchuk	RTD	6 (10), 3:00	20 Oct 2011	Bell Centre, Montreal, Canada	
5	Win	5–0	David Whittom	UD	4	21 May 2011	Bell Centre, Montreal, Canada	
4	Win	4–0	Ernesto Zamora	TKO	3 (4), 1:38	8 Apr 2011	Bell Centre, Montreal, Canada	
3	Win	3–0	Alvaro Enriquez	UD	4	7 Nov 2009	Montreal Casino, Montreal, Canada	
2	Win	2–0	Willard Lewis	TKO	2 (4), 1:40	3 Oct 2009	Montreal Casino, Montreal, Canada	
1	Win	1–0	Jesse Sanders	KO	1 (4), 2:03	28 Aug 2009	Montreal Casino, Montreal, Canada	

Sporting positions
Regional boxing titles
Vacant Title last held by Andrzej Fonfara	WBO–NABO light-heavyweight champion 10 December 2011 – January 2014; Vacated	Vacant Title next held by Thomas Williams Jr.
Preceded by Nicholson Poulard	WBA–NABA light-heavyweight champion 22 March 2013 – May 2014; Vacated	Vacant Title next held by Artur Beterbiev
Preceded by Ryno Liebenberg	WBC Silver light-heavyweight champion 25 October 2014 – 4 August 2018	Vacant Title next held by Marcus Browne
Minor world boxing titles
Preceded by Sergey Kovalev	IBA light-heavyweight champion 4 August 2018 – February 2019; Vacated	Vacant
Major world boxing titles
Preceded by Sergey Kovalev	WBO light-heavyweight champion 4 August 2018 – 2 February 2019	Succeeded by Sergey Kovalev
