= Marcus Browne =

American boxer

Personal information
- Nickname: Sir
- Born: November 10, 1990 (age 36) New York City, New York, U.S.
- Height: 1.87 m (6 ft 2 in)
- Weight: Light heavyweight

Boxing career
- Reach: 192 cm (76 in)
- Stance: Southpaw

Boxing record
- Total fights: 28
- Wins: 25
- Win by KO: 16
- Losses: 3

Marcus Browne (born November 10, 1990) is an American professional boxer who fights at light heavyweight, where he challenged for the WBC and IBF titles and held the WBA interim title.

== Early life ==
Browne is of Liberian and Trinidadian descent and grew up in Staten Island, New York. From an early age, he displayed athletic talent and a competitive spirit. Browne described his career ambition as starting young, consistently pursuing boxing as his primary goal.

== Professional career ==
=== Light heavyweight ===
==== Early career ====
After competing at the 2012 Summer Olympics, where he lost in the first round to Damien Hooper, Browne made his professional boxing debut at the age of 21, on November 9, 2012, on Friday night as part of a Golden Boy Promotions card. The fight took place at the Fantasy Springs Casino in Indio, California, against 33-year-old Codale Ford (2–0) in a scheduled 4-round bout. Also on the undercard were future prospects making their professional debuts including Dominic Breazeale, Terrell Gausha, Errol Spence Jr and Rau'shee Warren. Browne won the fight via technical knockout in round 3, overcoming Ford's awkward style. Browne fought again a month later in December producing a first-round knockout win over Ritchie Cherry on the undercard of Amir Khan vs. Carlos Molina.

Browne fought a total of six times in 2013, which was his first full year as a professional. He won all six fight, with five of them coming inside the distance. He was taken the 8-round distance against Lamont Williams (5–1–1, 2 KOs) and won the scorecards that read (79–72, 79–72, 76–75). Browne began to fight regularly at the Barclays Center in Brooklyn, New York.

On April 19, 2014, Browne was scheduled to fight at the DC Armory in Washington against 36 year old former USBA light heavyweight champion Otis Griffin (24–15–2, 10 KOs). This was his biggest challenge at the time, stepping up in competition. Prior to the fight, Griffin was on a 5-fight losing streak. In round 5, Browne dropped Griffin following a straight left, however Griffin beat the count and took Browne the 8-round distance for the second time in his career. Browne won a shutout decision on the scorecards (80–71, 3 times). The fight took place on Shawn Porter's IBF welterweight title defence against Paulie Malignaggi.

Browne's next big challenge came in August 2014 against 36 year old Paul Vasquez (10–5–1, 3 KOs) at the Barclays Center. Browne won the fight via stoppage after 28 seconds into the opening round. In December 2014, Browne fight at the Pechanga Resort & Casino in Temecula, California, against 40-year-old veteran George Blades (23–6, 16 KOs). Blades was a late replacement and weighed 196.6 pounds, nearly 20 pounds heavier than the contracted weight limit. Browne was originally scheduled to fight Henry Buchanan, who pulled out after suffering an injury in training. The fight was also dropped from being televised. Browne, despite being heavily outweighed, won the fight via first round stoppage victory.

On April 11, 2015, Browne was matched with 36 year old Aaron Pryor Jr. (19–7–1, 12 KOs), son of hall of famer former Lineal light welterweight champion Aaron Pryor. The fight took place in front of 12,300 fans at the Barclays Center on the undercard of Danny Garcia vs. Lamont Peterson. Pryor Jr. retired on his stool at the end of round 6, giving Browne his 11th stoppage win in 14 professional fights.

A month later, on May 29, Browne fought again at the Barclays Arena on the Amir Khan vs. Chris Algieri undercard. His opponent, considered as his best opponent to date was Cornelius White (21–3, 16 KOs). White had lost his last two fights via stoppage, against Sergey Kovalev and Thomas Wiliams Jr., the latter who he fought in January 2014. In the fifth round, both fighters tumbled to the canvas. Browne used his fast hands and outworked White in most rounds, who moved well enough to survive the full ten rounds, but he was in survival mode the last three rounds. Browne went ten rounds for the first time, winning a clear unanimous decision (99–91, 99–91, 98–92).

Four months later in September, Browne fought Spanish boxer and former WBA light heavyweight champion Gabriel Campillo (25–7–1, 12 KOs) at the Foxwoods Resort in Ledyard, Connecticut. Campillo was dropped twice in the first round, the second time, the count was waived giving Browne his 8th first round stoppage win. Browne returned again three months later in December against Mexican boxer and former IBO super middleweight title challenger Francisco Sierra (26–9–1, 23 KOs). The fight took place at the Barclays Center on the Daniel Jacobs vs. Peter Quillin WBA middleweight title fight undercard. Browne controlled the fight from the opening bell, eventually stopping Sierra in round 4 via technical knockout.

=== Moving up the ranks ===
==== Browne vs. Kalajdzic ====
It was announced that Browne would challenge for his first title, the vacant WBC USNBC light heavyweight title on April 16, 2016, against fellow undefeated 25 year old Radivoje Kalajdzic (25–0, 14 KOs) at the Barclays Center in an 8-round bout. The fight was originally scheduled for 10 rounds, but was cut to 8, minutes before the fight started, due to the main event following on. At the time of the fight, Browne was ranked number 7 by the WBA and number 13 by the WBC. Browne won the via a controversial split decision at the end of 8 rounds. Two judges scored the fight 76–74 and 76–75 in favour of Browne, whilst the third judge scored it 76–74 for Kalajdzic. There was controversy from the first round when Kalajdzic fell to the canvas. Browne was credited with the knockdown, although he never threw a punch. Referee Tony Chiarantano was stood behind Browne, most likely misjudged the decision to count the knockdown. In the replay, it shows that Browne landed a punch whilst Kalajdzic slipped. Browne was also dropped in the sixth round. Both fighters claimed they had won in the post fight press conference. A rematch, according to promoter Lou DiBella, was discussed. With the win, Browne won the vacant title.

The next day, Kalajdzic hit out at Browne, calling for a rematch, "I don't see how I lost. I was the aggressor. I showed my heart. If he feels like he beat me, give me the rematch." Browne later stated that he would not be giving Kalajdzic a rematch.

On January 3, 2017, it was announced that Browne would step up once again, this time against former world title challenger Thomas Williams Jr. (20–2, 14 KOs) on February 18. The fight took place at the Cintas Center in Cincinnati, Ohio. Browne defeated Williams, who lost his second consecutive fight. Williams was knocked down three times and eventually stopped in round 6 of the scheduled 10 round bout. A the time of stoppage, Browne was ahead on all three judges scorecards (49–43, 3 times), with Browne being deducted a point for hitting Williams after knocking him down with a jab. The referee counted to ten but quickly realized his error and gave Williams five minutes to recover and still counting the knockdown and taking the point. Browne earned a purse of $65,000 whilst Williams received the smaller amount of $35,000. Following the fight, Browne called out WBC and Lineal light heavyweight champion Adonis Stevenson, who had previously knocked out Williams.

==== Browne vs. Monaghan ====
On May 23, 2017, it was announced that Browne would fight 35 year old Sean Monaghan (28–0, 17 KOs) at the renovated Nassau Coliseaum in Uniondale, New York, on July 15, 2017. Original plans for was for Monaghan to challenge WBC and Lineal champion Adonis Stevenson, however he decided to fight Andrzej Fonfara instead. This was the first boxing event scheduled at the Coliseum since March 1986, which was headlined by Mike Tyson. Browne won the fight via second-round technical knockout. He started off the quicker of the two and it only took him 30 seconds into the first round following a straight left. Browne continued at the same pace in the second round landing a right hook which pushed Monaghan back. Browne then landed numerous punches unanswered whilst Monaghan was against the ropes. Referee Steve Willis immediately stepped in to stop the fight. Browne praised his good friend Monaghan in the post fight, "I want thank Sean for giving me the opportunity and taking the fight {...} This is a guy I got love for, but I just had to take care of business." He also called out WBC champion Adonis Stevenson. According to Compubox stats, Browne landed 42 of 105 punches thrown (40%), whist Monaghan only landed 9 of 52 thrown (17%). The whole card averaged 886,000 viewers on Fox.

==== Browne vs Ntetu ====
In November 2017, the WBC ordered Browne vs. Oleksandr Gvozdyk (14–0, 12 KO's) as an eliminator for their light heavyweight title. According to Gvozdyk's manager Egis Klimas, Browne pulled out of the fight. In December, it was announced that Browne would appear on the Showtime televised undercard of Errol Spence's IBF welterweight title defence against Lamont Peterson on January 20, 2018, at the Barclays Center in Brooklyn. His opponent was confirmed as Francy Ntetu (17–1, 4 KOs). Ntetu's sole defeat came in June 2016 against future WBC super middleweight champion David Benavidez. On fight night, Browne did not let Ntetu get into the fight, stopping him at 2 minutes and 15 seconds into the first round. Browne knocked Ntetu down with a right hand and left hook, which put him down flat on the canvas. Ntetu beat the count but ended up taking some hard shots to the head from Browne until referee Arthur Mercente stepped in and halted the fight.

On March 13, 2018, The Ring reported that rising contender Browne would likely challenge for his first world title against either Sergey Kovalev (32–2–1, 28 KOs) for the WBO title or IBF belt holder Artur Beterbiev (12–0, 12 KOs), where he was in a mandatory position. On March 18, a deal had been agreed for Kovalev to defend his WBO light heavyweight title against Browne at the Hulu Theater at Madison Square Garden in New York City on HBO. A date as early as June 23 was discussed but not finalized. On April 6, it was reported that Browne had been arrested for domestic violence, marking it the second time in four months he had been arrested. On April 18, Kovalev announced he would instead fight longtime WBC mandatory Eleider Álvarez in the summer of 2018.

==== Browne vs Castillo ====
On July 5, 2018, it was announced that Browne would return to the Nassau Coliseum in Uniondale, New York to appear on the undercard of Devon Alexander vs. Andre Berto on August 4. His opponent was confirmed as Dominican Republic boxer Lenin Castillo (18–1–1, 13 KOs) in a 10-round bout. Castillo was entering the fight with a 3-fight win streak, which saw all the wins come via stoppage. Despite a knockdown, Browne dominated Castillo over 10 rounds to win a unanimous decision. Browne started the fight at a steady pace. In round 5, as Browne was coming forward, he managed to land a few shots, at the same time, Castillo also landed a solid combination which saw Browne hit the canvas. Browne rose to his feet and did not look hurt. Castillo failed to carry on the momentum and Browne regained control of the fight using distance. The scores were 98–91, 98–91 and 97–92.

=== WBA 'interim' light heavyweight champion ===
==== Browne vs. Jack ====
In November 2018, Browne called out Badou Jack (22–1–3, 13 KOs) to fight him in what was an 'open division' as both traded words on Instagram. Both boxers claimed they were available to take the fight next and a few days later, Jack stated he was open to fighting WBA champion Dmitry Bivol, after Bivol's successful defence against veteran boxer Jean Pascal. According to RingTV.com on November 26, a deal was close to being reached for Jack and Browne to fight on the Manny Pacquiao vs. Adrien Broner Showtime PPV undercard on January 19, 2019. On December 17, the fight was announced to take place on the PPV undercard, taking place at the MGM Grand Garden Arena in Paradise, Nevada. Although both were ranked highly with the WBC, the fight would be contested for the WBA Interim light heavyweight title. Browne was 'honored and a privileged' to be able to fight on a big PPV undercard. He was also excited with the opportunity of fighting his first big name on his way to becoming a household name.

Browne used his youth, speed and power advantage to pound out a one-sided 12 round unanimous decision win over Jack, who suffered a horrendous cut on his forehead in round 7. The judges’ scores were 117–110, 116–111 and 119–108 in Browne's favor. Both boxers started fight off slow, but it was Browne who managed to do more to win the early rounds. In round 7, following an accidental clash of heads, a vertical cut appeared on Jack's forehead, with blood streaming down. The head clash seemed to be initiated by Jack, who according to Browne, was coming forward with his head all fight. Jack had his best round in round 12, as he attacked Browne hard in landing some nice shots. At this point, Jack needed a knockout, but was not able to hurt Browne. He lacked the power, and had taken so much punishment. After the fight, Browne said, "He was a real tough competitor. He thought he would take me deep in the rounds and drown me but I came in shape. I used my athletic ability. I did what I do best – box the crap out of people. I was too slick, too sharp." Jack did not stay long after the bout and was taken to a hospital. After being stitched up, Jack congratulated Browne, "I would like to thank all of the fans for your support! The cut was a nasty one, but I’m fine now, Alhamdulillah. Congrats to Marcus Browne who fought a great fight. Regardless of the cut he was the better man tonight. I am a warrior and will never quit. I dedicated this fight to the refugee children across the world who fight a much tougher fight than I did tonight. I will continue to fight for them until the end." Browne landed 145 of 515 punches thrown (28%) and Jack landed 66 of his 303 thrown (22%). Jack received $500,000 and Browne was guaranteed a $250,000 purse.

==== Browne vs Pascal ====
On May 3, 2019, PBC announced that Showtime would televise a doubleheader from NRG Arena in Houston. The card was scheduled to take place on June 29, with Jermall Charlo vs. Brandon Adams as the main event. It was rumoured that Browne would defend his WBA interim title against former world champion Jean Pascal (33–6–1, 20 KOs, 1 NC), who was coming off a lop-sided loss in November 2018 to Dmitry Bivol. A few weeks later, the Pascal-Browne bout was moved to the Barclays Center in Brooklyn on the undercard of Adam Kownacki vs. Chris Arreola, with the event now being televised by FOX. On June 6, a press release announced the card, making it official. Browne was arrested on June 12 for 'allegedly violating an order of protection' against his ex-girlfriend and their daughter. The said incident took place on May 22 after he barged into her home after dropping off their daughter. An argument broke out. It was said that this was the fourth time in the past 18 months where Browne had been in trouble, all involving the same woman. The arrest did not affect the fight with Pascal. Pascal did not underestimate Browne heading into the fight. He believed he was a rookie, but also hungry. He claimed they both knew each others styles very well. Pascal was going to rely on his experience to win the fight. At the kick off presser, Browne warned, "Don't blink, I'm knocking his ass out.", suggesting he was going for a stoppage win. Pascal laughed off his statement. Tensions rose during fight week. Pascal shoved Browne and then brought up his recent arrest. From a plastic bag, Pascal pulled out a wig and asked if Browne would still knock him out. Browne did not get up from his seat as Pascal shouted “You, woman-beater,” into his microphone. Browne weighed in 173½ pounds and Pascal was slightly heavier at 174½ pounds.

Browne was a heavy favourite going into the fight and although Browne won the majority of the rounds, Pascal knocked him down a total of three times in the fight, once in the fourth round and twice in the seventh round. This gave Pascal a lead of 75–74 on all three judges' scorecards at the time of the stoppage in the middle of the eighth round, when the fight was halted due to a clash of heads. As a result, Pascal emerged victorious via unanimous technical decision, and became the new WBA interim champion. All three knockdowns came from a right hand, but Browne outboxed Pascal for the majority of the fight. The cut which caused the premature stoppage of the fight was over Browne’s left eye. Speaking to FOX reporters after the fight, Pascal said, “Boxing is boxing. We clashed heads. But at the end of the day, I was winning the round. I dropped him three times. It was a close fight, but I believe I was winning.” The event drew 8,790 fans in attendance. According to Compubox, Browne landed 106 of 276 punches thrown (38%) and Pascal landed only 51 of his 264 thrown (19%). Browne did not stay for the post-fight interviews and made his way to NYU Lutheran Medical Center.

Unsure on how long it would take Browne to heal from the cut, Pascal's manager Greg Leon stated talks would be held with Browne's team for a potential rematch, as it was expected that Browne would activate the rematch clause. A preference was for the rematch to take place in Quebec, where Pascal was a well-known ticket seller. Although recent crowds drawn in Miami and Brooklyn meant there was other options. Pascal planned to take another fight before the year end, possibly a stay-busy whilst waiting for Browne to make a recovery. Pascal was back in the fold on the light heavyweight division.

=== Post-title ===
==== Browne vs Grachev ====
Browne returned to boxing following a near two-year absence from the sport to face Denis Grachev on April 20, 2021. Grachev, a former kickboxer, was seen as a stay-active fight, which wasn't supposed to present a challenge for Browne. The bout was announced for the untelevised undercard of the Frank Martin vs Jerry Perez lightweight clash. Browne was originally expected to face Gilberto Ramírez for the vacant interim WBC super middleweight title, before Ramírez withdrew from the bout on February 12, 2021. Browne, who entered the fight as a –10,000 favorite, beat Grachev by unanimous decision. Neither PBC nor Browne made mention of the contest afterwards.

==== Browne vs Beterbiev ====
On August 20, 2021, the WBC ordered the unified light heavyweight champion Artur Beterbiev to defend his title against Browne. The pair was given until September 17, 2021, to reach a deal. On September 15, the WBC granted them an additional eleven days to come to terms, before a purse bid would be held. The purse bid was eventually won by Beterbiev's Top Rank, who offered $1,005,000 for the rights to promote the fight, while their bidding rivals TGB Promotions offered $1,000,001. The fight was scheduled for December 17, 2021, and was held at the Bell Centre in Montreal, Quebec, Canada. After appearing to lose the first three rounds, Beterbiev began to take over following an accidental clash of heads in the fourth round which left both fighters cut. Browne lost the fight by a ninth-round knockout, failing to raise in time to beat the ten-count after being dropped by a left uppercut. Browne was furthermore knocked down in the seventh round as well. Whilst against the ropes, Beterbiev landed a left hook to the body, followed by a right to the head, resulted in Browne dropping to a knee midway through the round. Speaking after the fight on the cut, Beterbiev said, “We win this fight. This is another experience in my career. This is boxing. You never know what happens in boxing. I’m happy to get the win.”

=== Cruiserweight ===
After a two-year hiatus, Browne returned to the ring, now competing in the cruiserweight division. He fought 32-year-old Adrian Taylor (13–1–1, 5 KOs) in the non-broadcast segment of the Emanuel Rodriguez vs. Melvin Lopez bantamweight championship event at the MGM National Harbor in Oxon Hill, Maryland. Taylor entered the fight on a seven-fight unbeaten streak. Browne weighed a career-high 198 ½ pounds. He won via unanimous decision after 10-rounds. All three judges scored the fight 100–90 for Browne.

==== Browne vs Glanton ====
With five weeks notice, Browne agreed to fight Brandon Glanton (20–3, 17 KOs) in Lagos on October 1, 2025, Nigerian Independence Day. Browne took the place of British boxer Rocky Fielding, who had withdrawn for undisclosed reasons. The event was promoted by Amir Khan. Glanton aimed to return to victory after his decision loss to Chris Billam-Smith in April 2025. There was notable animosity between the two boxers stemming from previous encounters. Browne regarded the transition to cruiserweight as a seamless adjustment. He conveyed confidence in his capability to secure a knockout against Glanton, while also recognizing his opponent's experience. He arrived in Nigeria ten days earlier and reported feeling focused and prepared. Browne weighed 199.2 pounds, while Glanton came in at 199.6 pounds. Browne was defeated by a sixth-round technical knockout. The fight displayed a notable shift in dynamics, as Glanton initially found it challenging to maintain the pace set by Browne, who effectively targeted Glanton's body in the early rounds. As the fight progressed, Glanton's persistent pressure began to yield results. By the fourth round, he had reversed the momentum in his favor, keeping Browne against the ropes and concentrating on attacking his body. This approach continued into the fifth round, during which Browne's earlier effectiveness waned, and he showed signs of fatigue. In the critical sixth round, Glanton overwhelmed Browne with powerful uppercuts, ultimately resulting in Browne not returning for the seventh round.

== Controversy ==
On April 6, 2018, Browne was arrested for two domestic incidents. Authorities alleged that Browne had violated an order of protection by demanding entry to his ex-girlfriend's apartment and threatening to break in if she didn't obey his demands. The incident took place on March 30, 2018, while the order of protection against Browne was issued on December 28, 2017, after Browne had allegedly assaulted the woman in question. It was later revealed that Browne had been arrested once again for attacking his ex-girlfriend. He allegedly kicked in the woman's door and choked her. Browne later pleaded guilty to criminal contempt in the second degree on January 19, 2019, and was sentenced to 26 sessions of the batterer's intervention program and a conditional discharge with a full order of protection.

On June 14, 2019, Browne was once again arrested, which was his fourth arrest in 18 months. He was charged with felony counts of criminal contempt and aggravated family offense, as well as misdemeanor counts of criminal trespass and criminal contempt. The arrest came five months after he had pleaded guilty to criminal contempt.

== Professional boxing record ==
28 fights	25 wins	3 losses
By knockout	16	2
By decision	9	1

No.	Result	Record	Opponent	Type	Round, time	Date	Location	Notes
28	Loss	25–3	Brandon Glanton	RTD	6 (10), 3:00	1 Oct 2025	Mobolaji Johnson Arena, Lagos, Nigeria	
27	Win	25–2	Adrian Taylor	UD	10	12 Aug 2023	MGM National Harbor, Oxon Hill, Maryland, U.S.	
26	Loss	24–2	Artur Beterbiev	KO	9 (12), 0:46	17 Dec 2021	Bell Centre, Montreal, Quebec, Canada	For WBC and IBF light-heavyweight titles
25	Win	24–1	Denis Grachev	UD	10	20 Apr 2021	Shrine Exposition Center, Los Angeles, California, U.S.	
24	Loss	23–1	Jean Pascal	TD	8 (12), 1:49	3 Aug 2019	Barclays Center, New York City, New York, U.S.	Lost WBA interim and WBC Silver light heavyweight titles
23	Win	23–0	Badou Jack	UD	12	19 Jan 2019	MGM Grand Garden Arena, Paradise, Nevada, U.S.	Won WBA interim and WBC Silver light heavyweight titles
22	Win	22–0	Gilbert Lenin Castillo	UD	10	4 Aug 2018	Nassau Coliseum, Uniondale, New York, U.S.	
21	Win	21–0	Francy Ntetu	TKO	1 (10), 2:15	20 Jan 2018	Barclays Center, New York City, New York, U.S.	
20	Win	20–0	Sean Monaghan	TKO	2 (10), 0:40	15 Jul 2017	Nassau Coliseum, Uniondale, New York, U.S.	
19	Win	19–0	Thomas Williams Jr.	KO	6 (10), 2:18	18 Feb 2017	Cintas Center, Cincinnati, Ohio, U.S.	
18	Win	18–0	Radivoje Kalajdzic	SD	8	16 Apr 2016	Barclays Center, New York City, New York, U.S.	Won vacant WBC USNBC light heavyweight title
17	Win	17–0	Francisco Sierra	TKO	4 (10), 0:01	5 Dec 2015	Barclays Center, New York City, New York, U.S.	
16	Win	16–0	Gabriel Campillo	KO	1 (10), 0:55	12 Sep 2015	Foxwoods Resort Casino, Ledyard, Connecticut, U.S.	
15	Win	15–0	Cornelius White	UD	10	29 May 2015	Barclays Center, New York City, New York, U.S.	
14	Win	14–0	Aaron Pryor Jr	RTD	6 (10), 3:00	11 Apr 2015	Barclays Center, New York City, New York, U.S.	
13	Win	13–0	George Blades	KO	1 (8), 1:25	11 Dec 2014	Pechanga Resort & Casino, Temecula, California, U.S.	
12	Win	12–0	Paul Vasquez	TKO	1 (10), 0:28	9 Aug 2014	Barclays Center, New York City, New York, U.S.	
11	Win	11–0	Donta Woods	TKO	1 (8), 1:31	27 Jun 2014	Hard Rock Hotel and Casino, Paradise, Nevada, U.S.	
10	Win	10–0	Otis Griffin	UD	8	19 Apr 2014	D.C. Armory, Washington, D.C., U.S.	
9	Win	9–0	Kentrell Claiborne	UD	6	30 Jan 2014	Barclays Center, New York City, New York, U.S.	
8	Win	8–0	Kevin Engel	TKO	1 (6), 3:00	7 Dec 2013	Barclays Center, New York City, New York, U.S.	
7	Win	7–0	Lamont Williams	UD	8	30 Sep 2013	Barclays Center, New York City, New York, U.S.	
6	Win	6–0	Robert Hill	KO	1 (4), 0:59	19 Aug 2013	Best Buy Theater, New York City, New York, U.S.	
5	Win	5–0	Ricardo Campillo	TKO	2 (6), 1:00	22 Jun 2013	Barclays Center, New York City, New York, U.S.	
4	Win	4–0	Teneal Goyco	TKO	2 (4), 0:54	27 Apr 2013	Barclays Center, New York City, New York, U.S.	
3	Win	3–0	Josh Thorpe	TKO	1 (4), 2:42	9 Mar 2013	Barclays Center, New York City, New York, U.S.	
2	Win	2–0	Ritchie Cherry	KO	1 (4), 2:59	15 Dec 2012	Memorial Sports Arena, Los Angeles, California, U.S.	
1	Win	1–0	Codale Ford	TKO	3 (4), 1:04	9 Nov 2012	Fantasy Springs Resort Casino, Palm Springs, California, U.S.	

Achievements
Vacant Title last held by Eleider Álvarez	WBC light heavyweight champion Silver title January 19 – August 3, 2019	Succeeded by Jean Pascal
World boxing titles
Vacant Title last held by Dmitry Bivol	WBA light heavyweight champion Interim title January 19 – August 3, 2019	Succeeded by Jean Pascal
