= Gabriel Campillo =

Spanish boxer (born 1978)

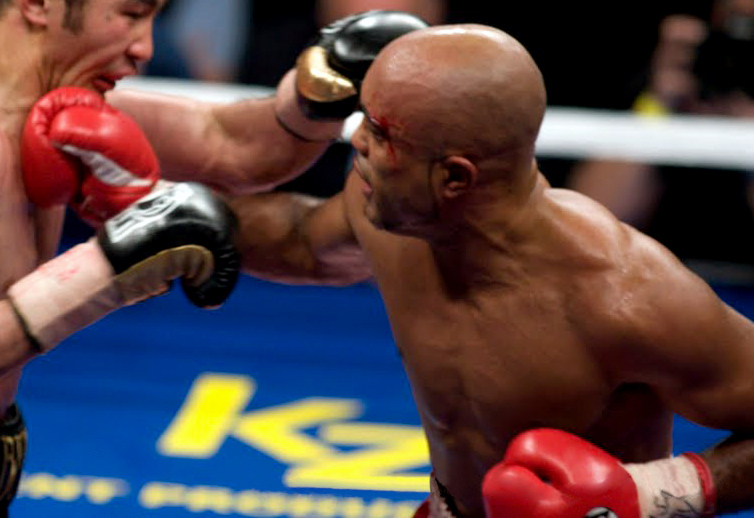
- Campillo (right) vs. Shumenov, 2010

Personal information
- Nicknames: Chico Guapo ("The Handsome Guy")
- Nationality: Spanish
- Born: 19 December 1978 (age 47) Madrid, Spain
- Weight: Super-middleweight; Light-heavyweight

Boxing career
- Stance: Southpaw

Boxing record
- Total fights: 34
- Wins: 25
- Win by KO: 12
- Losses: 8
- Draws: 1

Gabriel Campillo (born 19 December 1978) is a Spanish former professional boxer who competed from 2002 to 2015, and held the WBA light-heavyweight title from 2009 to 2010.

== Professional career ==
Campillo made his professional debut on 2 February 2002, which ended in a four-round no contest against David Hernandez. On 20 September 2008, Campillo fought for the European super-middleweight title, but lost a twelve-round majority decision to Karo Murat. In his next fight, on 8 March 2009, Campillo won his first major regional championship by scoring a unanimous decision over then-reigning European Union super-middleweight champion Lolenga Mock.

On 20 June 2009, Campillo moved up to light-heavyweight and won the WBA title with a majority decision over Hugo Garay. Campillo defended the title on 15 August 2009 against Beibut Shumenov, scoring another majority decision. In their subsequent rematch, Campillo lost his title to Shumenov via split decision, in a result that was described as controversial by ringside observers. Further bad luck with judges' scorecards would continue for Campillo when he faced IBF light-heavyweight champion Tavoris Cloud on 18 February 2012, losing a split decision. Despite suffering two knockdowns in the first round, Campillo got up to win most of the rest of the rounds in the eyes of many ringside observers.

In his last series of fights, Campillo suffered numerous knockout losses to Sergey Kovalev, Andrzej Fonfara, Artur Beterbiev, and Marcus Browne.

== Professional boxing record ==
34 fights	25 wins	8 losses
By knockout	12	5
By decision	13	3
Draws	1	

No.	Result	Record	Opponent	Type	Round, time	Date	Location	Notes
34	Loss	25–8–1	Marcus Browne	KO	1 (10), 0:55	12 Sep 2015	Foxwoods Resort Casino, Ledyard, Connecticut, US	
33	Loss	25–7–1	Artur Beterbiev	KO	4 (12), 0:37	4 Apr 2015	Colisée Pepsi, Quebec City, Quebec, Canada	For IBF North American light-heavyweight title
32	Win	25–6–1	Mirzet Bajrektarevic	TKO	7 (8)	12 Dec 2014	Pavelló de la Vall d'Hebron, Barcelona, Spain	
31	Win	24–6–1	Thomas Williams Jr.	RTD	5 (12), 3:00	1 Aug 2014	Little Creek Casino Resort, Shelton, Washington, US	Won WBO–NABO light-heavyweight title
30	Win	23–6–1	Ricky Dennis Pow	TKO	7 (10)	9 May 2014	Gran Canaria Arena, Las Palmas, Spain	
29	Loss	22–6–1	Andrzej Fonfara	KO	9 (12), 1:37	16 Aug 2013	US Cellular Field, Chicago, Illinois, US	
28	Win	22–5–1	Ionut Trandafir Ilie	TKO	2 (8)	14 Jun 2013	Polideportivo Municipal, Sedaví, Spain	
27	Loss	21–5–1	Sergey Kovalev	TKO	3 (10), 1:30	19 Jan 2013	Mohegan Sun Arena, Montville, Connecticut, US	
26	Loss	21–4–1	Tavoris Cloud	SD	12	18 Feb 2012	American Bank Center, Corpus Christi, Texas, US	For IBF light-heavyweight title
25	Draw	21–3–1	Karo Murat	SD	12	1 Oct 2011	Jahnsportforum, Neubrandenburg, Germany	For IBF Inter-Continental light-heavyweight title
24	Win	21–3	Sergey Beloshapkin	TKO	5 (8)	15 Apr 2011	La Cubierta, Leganés, Spain	
23	Win	20–3	Luzimar Gonzaga	KO	1 (8)	15 May 2010	La Cubierta, Leganés, Spain	
22	Loss	19–3	Beibut Shumenov	SD	12	29 Jan 2010	The Joint, Paradise, Nevada, US	Lost WBA light-heavyweight Title; For IBA light-heavyweight title
21	Win	19–2	Beibut Shumenov	MD	12	15 Aug 2009	Daulet National Tennis Centre, Astana, Kazakhstan	Retained WBA light-heavyweight title
20	Win	18–2	Hugo Hernán Garay	MD	12	20 Jun 2009	Hogar de los Tigres, Sunchales, Argentina	Won WBA light-heavyweight title
19	Win	17–2	Lolenga Mock	UD	12	8 Mar 2009	Holmegårdsskolen, Kokkedal, Denmark	Won European Union super-middleweight title
18	Loss	16–2	Karo Murat	MD	12	20 Sep 2008	Seidensticker Halle, Bielefeld, Germany	For European super-middleweight title
17	Win	16–1	Roberto Santos	PTS	8	31 May 2008	Polideportivo Municipal Dehesa Boyal, San Sebastián de los Reyes, Spain	
16	Win	15–1	Sergey Kharchenko	PTS	6	18 Apr 2008	Casal Cultural i Recreatiu, Castellbisbal, Spain	
15	Win	14–1	Israel Carrillo	UD	6	8 Mar 2008	Polideportivo Sage2000, Madrid, Spain	
14	Win	13–1	Pavel Florian Madalin	TKO	3 (6)	2 Feb 2008	Polideportivo Sage2000, Madrid, Spain	
13	Loss	12–1	Vyacheslav Uzelkov	KO	6 (12)	13 Sep 2007	Palace of Sports, Kyiv, Ukraine	For vacant WBA Inter-Continental light-heavyweight title
12	Win	12–0	Juan Nelongo	TKO	5 (10)	19 May 2007	Gimnasio del Rayo Vallecano, Madrid, Spain	Retained Spanish light-heavyweight title
11	Win	11–0	Fernando Fernandes	TKO	3 (6)	30 Mar 2007	Polideportivo Municipal, Catral, Spain	
10	Win	10–0	Juan Nelongo	UD	10	3 Dec 2005	Santa Cruz de Tenerife, Spain	Won Spanish light-heavyweight title
9	Win	9–0	Oliver Tchinda	PTS	6	17 Sep 2005	Madrid, Spain	
8	Win	8–0	Igor Lazarenko	TKO	5 (6)	11 Dec 2004	Móstoles, Spain	
7	Win	7–0	Florin Chidici	PTS	4	19 Jun 2004	Plaza de Toros, Móstoles, Spain	
6	Win	6–0	Igor Lusakano	PTS	4	25 Apr 2004	Club Deportivo Barceló, Madrid, Spain	
5	Win	5–0	Alexander Beroshvili	PTS	4	13 Feb 2004	Polideportivo de Alcobendas, Madrid, Spain	
4	Win	4–0	Yarali Yaraliev	PTS	4	6 Nov 2003	Polideportivo de Alcobendas, Madrid, Spain	
3	Win	3–0	Roman Merenkov	TKO	3 (4)	7 Jun 2003	Pueblo Español, Palma, Spain	
2	Win	2–0	Arturas Margis	PTS	4	14 Mar 2003	Polideportivo Huerta del Rey, Valladolid, Spain	
1	Win	1–0	Arturas Margis	RTD	3 (4), 3:00	4 Oct 2002	Guadalajara, Spain	

Sporting positions
Regional boxing titles
Preceded by Juan Nelongo	Spanish light-heavyweight champion 3 December 2005 – February 2008; Vacated	Vacant Title next held by Alejandro Lakatos
Preceded by Lolenga Mock	European Union light-heavyweight champion 8 March 2009 – June 2009; Vacated	Vacant Title next held by Lolenga Mock
Preceded by Thomas Williams Jr.	WBO–NABO light-heavyweight champion 1 August 2014 – December 2014; Vacated	Vacant Title next held by Artur Beterbiev
World boxing titles
Preceded by Hugo Garay	WBA light-heavyweight champion 20 June 2009 – 29 January 2010	Succeeded by Beibut Shumenov
