= Thomas Williams Jr. =

American boxer (born 1987)

Personal information
- Nickname: Top Dog
- Born: Thomas Williams Jr. August 25, 1987 (age 39) Fort Washington, Maryland, U.S.
- Height: 6 ft 1 in (185 cm)
- Weight: Light Heavyweight

Boxing career
- Reach: 72 in (183 cm)

Boxing record
- Total fights: 24
- Wins: 20
- Win by KO: 14
- Losses: 4
- Draws: 0
- No contests: 0

Thomas Williams Jr. (born August 25, 1987) is an American professional boxer from Fort Washington, Maryland. He challenged for the WBC and Lineal light heavyweight titles in 2016.

== Professional career ==
Williams turned professional at 2010 after a strong amateur career. He is managed by 2012 Boxing Writers Association of America Manager of the Year Al Haymon.

=== Early career ===
A 23-year-old Williams made his debut as a light heavyweight on November 6, 2010, at the Jaycees Community Center, Waldorf, Maryland against 34-year-old Daniel Shull in a scheduled 4-round bout. Williams won via unanimous decision (40–35, 40–35 and 40–35) on all three judges scorecards. In 2011, Williams fought a total of five times, winning all of them, his opponents, Bennie Meeks, who Williams beat via first-round TKO, Mark Anderson via points, Lee Lee Pender via 1st-round knockout, Donnie Moore via 1st-round knockout and Reynaldo Rodriguez via 2nd-round knockout.

=== Rise up the ranks ===
Williams faced his toughest test on November 26, 2013, at the BB&T Center in Sunrise, Florida against former two-time world title challenger Yusaf Mack (31–6–2, 17 KOs) in a scheduled 10-round fight. The fight went the distance with Williams winning via unanimous decision, the three judges scored it (99–91, 98–92 and 97–92). Williams next fought 32 year old Cornelius White (21–2, 16 KOs) on January 24, 2014, at the Little Creek Casino Resort, Washington for the vacant WBO NABO light heavyweight title. All the action took place in round 1 as Williams was knocked down first; however, Williams recovered and managed to knockdown White twice as the referee waved the fight off after 2 minutes and 49 seconds of round 1. On April 24, 2014, Williams defeated Enrique Ornelas (34–6, 22 KOs) via 3rd-round knockout.

Williams defended his WBO NABO title against 35 year old Spanish boxer Gabriel Campillo (23–6–1, 10 KOs) on August 1, 2014. Williams was ahead on 2 scorecards after 5 rounds (49–46, 49–46 and 47–48), but never came out for round 6, resulting in his first loss as a professional, bringing his record to 17 wins, with 1 loss. This fight was also an IBF Eliminator for the #2 spot. Following his loss against Campillo, Williams reached out to famed boxing trainer and commentator, Theodore "Teddy" Atlas, and received advice that the test of a man and of a champion is, "...what you do after this, what you learn from this, [and] what you do from this moment on." This advice was not lost on Williams.

Williams fought four months later in December against experienced 35-year-old Michael Gbenga at UIC Pavilion in Chicago. The fight went a full 10 rounds as Williams was announced the winner unanimously 98–91 on all three scorecards. After an 11 months hiatus, Williams returned to the ring in November 2015 at the Beau Rivage Resort & Casino, Biloxi, Mississippi against Umberto Savigne (12–2, 9 KOs). Savigne and Williams were both knocked down in the first round. Savigne was down again in round 2 as referee Keith Hughes waved the fight off.

==== Williams vs. Rodriguez ====
Williams returned to the ring on April 30, 2016, on the undercard of Ortiz-Berto at the StubHub Center, Carson, California in a scheduled 10-round fight against former world title challenger Edwin Rodriguez (28–1, 19 KOs), whose only career loss was to undefeated super-middleweight champion Andre Ward. The fight was initially due to take place on the Thurman-Porter undercard on March 12 at the Mohegan Sun Casino in Uncasville, Connecticut. The fight was postponed after Thurman was involved in a car accident. The fight lasted 6 minutes, as Rodriguez was knocked down twice in round 2.

=== Consecutive defeats ===
==== Williams vs. Stevenson ====
Promoter Yvon Michel announced on June 16, 2016, Williams would challenge 38-year-old lineal and WBC World light heavyweight champion Adonis Stevenson (27–1, 22 KOs) on July 29 at the Videotron Centre in Quebec City. This was Stevenson's seventh title defense. Williams weighed in the heaviest of the two at 174.6lbs with Stevenson in at 173.6lbs. In a brief slug fest, Stevenson knocked out Williams in round 4 to retain his titles in his seventh successful defense. Stevenson connected with a hard left to Williams' head in round one that floored him with approximately 30 seconds left, however Williams beat the referees count and survived the round. In round 4, Stevenson concentrated much of his attack to Williams body, even hitting an accidental low blow halting the fight for a timeout whilst he recovered. When the fight resumed, Stevenson continued to attack to the body. Whilst groggy, Stevenson connected with a left to the head, dropping Williams for a final time. The time of stoppage was six seconds before the end of the round.

==== Williams vs. Browne ====
On February 18, 2017, Williams lost his second consecutive fight. He was knocked down three times and eventually stopped in round 6 of the scheduled 10 round bout against prospect Marcus Browne (18–0, 13 KOs). Browne was ranked #11 by the WBC and WBO and #13 by the IBF at light heavyweight. The fight took place at the Cintas Center in Cincinnati, Ohio. A the time of stoppage, Williams was behind on all three judges scorecards (49–43, 3 times), with Browne being deducted a point for hitting Williams after knocking him down with a jab. The referee counted to ten but quickly realized his error and gave Williams five minutes to recover and still counting the knockdown and taking the point. Browne earned a purse of $65,000 whilst Williams received the smaller amount of $35,000. Following the fight, Browne called out WBC and Lineal light heavyweight champion Adonis Stevenson, who had previously knocked out Williams.

==== Williams vs. Torres ====
After a full year out, Williams returned on the undercard of Victor Ortiz vs. Devon Alexander on 17 February 2018 at the Don Haskins Center in El Paso, Texas. Williams suffered his third consecutive stoppage defeat, losing to Mexican boxer Humberto Velazco Torres. Williams was knocked out for the ten-count in round 4.

== Professional boxing record ==
24 fights, 20 wins (14 knockouts), 4 losses, 0 draw, 0 NC
No.	Result	Record	Opponent	Type	Round, time	Date	Location	Notes
24	Loss	20–4	(Mexico) Humberto Velazco Torres	KO	4 (10)	17 Feb 2018	(United States) Don Haskins Center, El Paso, Texas, USA	
23	Loss	20–3	(United States) Marcus Browne	KO	6 (10), 0:42	18 Feb 2017	(United States) Cintas Center, Cincinnati, Ohio, USA	
22	Loss	20–2	(Canada) Adonis Stevenson	KO	4 (12), 2:54	29 Jul 2016	Videotron Centre, Quebec City, Quebec, Canada	For Lineal & WBC Light heavyweight title
21	Win	20–1	(Dominican Republic) Edwin Rodriguez	KO	2 (10), 2:59	30 Apr 2016	(United States) StubHub Center, Carson, California, USA	
20	Win	19–1	(Cuba) Umberto Savigne	TKO	2 (10), 1:48	13 Nov 2015	(United States) Beau Rivage Resort & Casino, Biloxi, Mississippi, USA	
19	Win	18–1	(Ghana) Michael Gbenga	UD	10	12 Dec 2014	(United States) UIC Pavilion, Chicago, Illinois, USA	
18	Loss	17–1	(Spain) Gabriel Campillo	RTD	5 (12), 3:00	01 Aug 2014	(United States) Little Creek Casino Resort, Shelton, Washington, USA	Lost WBO NABO light heavyweight title.
17	Win	17–0	(Mexico) Enrique Ornelas	KO	3 (10), 2:48	24 Apr 2014	(United States) Agua Caliente Casino, Rancho Mirage, California, USA	
16	Win	16–0	(United States) Cornelius White	TKO	1 (10), 2:49	24 Jan 2014	(United States) Little Creek Casino Resort, Shelton, Washington, USA	Won vacant WBO NABO light heavyweight title.
15	Win	15–0	(United States) Yusaf Mack	UD	10	26 Nov 2013	(United States) BB&t Center, Sunrise, Florida, USA	
14	Win	14–0	(United States) Otis Griffin	UD	8	18 May 2013	(United States) Boardwalk Hall, Atlantic City, New Jersey, USA	
13	Win	13–0	(United States) Kevin Engel	TKO	3 (8), 1:31	02 Mar 2013	(United States) Hard Rock Hotel and Casino, Las Vegas, Nevada, USA	
12	Win	12–0	(United States) Jason Smith	TKO	3 (8), 1:56	12 Jan 2013	(United States) BB&t Center, Sunrise, Florida, USA	
11	Win	11–0	(Mexico) Ricardo Campillo	TKO	5 (6), 1:19	08 Dec 2012	(United States) Business Expo Center, Anaheim, California, USA	
10	Win	10–0	(United States) Harley Kilfian	KO	1 (6), 1:41	04 Aug 2012	(United States) Exposition Hall, Mobile, Alabama, USA	
9	Win	9–0	(Dominican Republic) Ariel Espinal	TKO	1 (6)	14 Jul 2012	(United States) Convention Center, Washington, District of Columbia, USA	
8	Win	8–0	(United States) Jess Noriega	TKO	1 (6)	12 May 2012	(United States) Convention Center, Washington, District of Columbia, USA	
7	Win	7–0	(United States) Kentrell Claiborne	UD	4	18 Feb 2012	(United States) American Bank Center, Corpus Christi, Texas, USA	
6	Win	6–0	(Puerto Rico) Reynaldo Rodriguez	KO	2 (4), 0:56	10 Dec 2011	(United States) Convention Center, Washington, District of Columbia, USA	
5	Win	5–0	(United States) Donnie Moore	TKO	1 (4), 2:18	24 Sep 2011	(United States) Omar Shrine Temple, South Carolina, USA	
4	Win	4–0	(United States) Lee Lee Pender	KO	1 (4), 1:43	17 Sep 2011	(United States) Rec Center, Wilson, North Carolina, USA	
3	Win	3–0	(United States) Mark Anderson	UD	4	12 Aug 2011	(United States) Club Spotlight, Florence, South Carolina, USA	
2	Win	2–0	(United States) Bennie Meeks	TKO	1 (4), 2:00	21 May 2011	(United States) Rec Center, Wilson, North Carolina, USA	
1	Win	1–0	(United States) Daniel Shull	UD	4	06 Nov 2010	Jaycees Community Center, Waldorf, Maryland, United States	

== Personal life ==
Williams is the son of former heavyweight contender Thomas "Top Dawg" Williams Sr.
