= Otis Griffin =

American boxer

Personal information
- Nickname: Triple OG
- Nationality: American
- Born: Otis Vanturius Griffin; August 22, 1977 (age 49) Troy, Alabama, U.S.
- Height: 6 ft 1 in (185 cm)
- Weight: Super middleweight Light heavyweight Cruiserweight

Boxing career
- Reach: 71 in (180 cm)
- Stance: Orthodox

Boxing record
- Total fights: 44
- Wins: 24
- Win by KO: 10
- Losses: 18
- Draws: 2

Otis Griffin (born August 22, 1977) is an American professional boxer and ranked light heavyweight contender.

== Professional career ==
Griffin fought on several major undercards and has been featured on ESPN. He captured the NABO light heavyweight championship with a technical knockout over unbeaten prospect Mike Nevitt. In July 2007, Griffin lost by a technical knockout to light heavyweight champion Danny Green of the World Boxing Association at Challenge Stadium in Perth, Australia. Green dropped Griffin three times before the bout was stopped. In 2008 he was stopped in the 11th round by former contender Jesse Brinkley. Griffin went on to a controversial loss against Jeff Lacey. In May 2010 Griffin won a USBA title belt after he knocked out former WBA super middleweight world champion Byron Mitchell.

=== The Next Great Champ ===
Griffin was a contestant on the reality TV show The Next Great Champ on Fox. Although he lost an earlier bout on the show, Griffin was given another chance and after winning several bouts on the program, he was proclaimed the winner and "The Next Great Champ" when he beat David Pareja.

== Professional boxing record ==
44 fights	24 wins	18 losses
By knockout	10	7
By decision	14	11
Draws	2	

No.	Result	Record	Opponent	Type	Round, time	Date	Location	Notes
44	Loss	24–18–2	Oleksandr Gvozdyk	TKO	6 (8), 1:51	2014-11-15	Alamodome, San Antonio, Texas, U.S.	
43	Loss	24–17–2	Travis Peterkin	UD	8	2014-10-15	BB King Blues Club & Grill, New York City, New York, U.S.	
42	Loss	24–16–2	Marcus Browne	UD	8	2014-04-19	D.C. Armory, Washington, D.C., U.S.	
41	Loss	24–15–2	Joe Smith Jr.	UD	6	2014-02-12	Roseland Ballroom, New York City, New York, U.S.	
40	Loss	24–14–2	Radivoje Kalajdzic	TKO	1 (10), 1:49	2013-10-18	Westshore Doubletree Hotel, Tampa, Florida, U.S.	
39	Loss	24–13–2	Thomas Williams Jr.	UD	8	2013-05-18	Boardwalk Hall, Atlantic City, New Jersey, U.S.	
38	Loss	24–12–2	Cornelius White	UD	8	2013-03-09	The Hangar, Costa Mesa, California, U.S.	
37	Loss	24–11–2	Will Rosinsky	UD	10	2012-12-19	Roseland Ballroom, New York City, New York, U.S.	
36	Win	24–10–2	Adam Collins	TKO	2 (8), 1:22	2012-08-24	DoubleTree Hotel, Sacramento, California, U.S.	
35	Loss	23–10–2	Cedric Agnew	UD	12	2012-05-03	Anatole Hotel, Dallas, Texas, U.S.	For WBC United States (USNBC) light heavyweight title
34	Loss	23–9–2	Shawn Hawk	SD	10	2011-10-20	Coeur d’Alene Casino, Worley, Idaho, U.S.	
33	Loss	23–8–2	Karo Murat	TKO	11 (12), 2:59	2011-05-07	Jahnsportforum, Neubrandenburg, Germany	For vacant IB Inter-Continental light heavyweight title
32	Loss	23–7–2	YU.S.f Mack	SD	12	2011-03-04	Warner Center Marriott, Woodland Hills, California, U.S.	Lost USBA light heavyweight title
31	Win	23–6–2	Billy Bailey	UD	8	2010-08-28	Churchill County Regional Park, Fallon, Nevada, U.S.	
30	Win	22–6–2	Byron Mitchell	TKO	8 (12), 1:45	2010-05-07	Oheka Castle, Huntington, New York, U.S.	Won vacant USBA light heavyweight title.
29	Win	21–6–2	Joe McCreedy	UD	8	2009-11-20	Twin River Event Center, Lincoln, Rhode Island, U.S.	
28	Win	20–6–2	Ernesto Castaneda	KO	6 (6), 1:02	2009-09-12	Red Lion Hotel, Sacramento, California, U.S.	
27	Loss	19–6–2	Marcus Oliveira	KO	2 (8), 2:25	2009-06-05	Grand Casino, Hinckley, Minnesota, U.S.	
26	Loss	19–5–2	Jeff Lacy	MD	10	2009-04-10	Sun Dome, Tampa, Florida, U.S.	
25	Loss	19–4–2	Enad Ličina	TKO	3 (12), 1:38	2008-11-08	Jako Arena, Bamberg, Germany	For vacant IBF Inter-Continental cruiserweight title
24	Win	19–3–2	Carl Cockerham	UD	6	2008-05-15	Red Lion Hotel, Sacramento, California, U.S.	
23	Loss	18–3–2	Jesse Brinkley	TKO	11 (12), 0:24	2008-02-22	Silver Legacy Resort & Casino, Reno, Nevada, U.S.	For vacant WBC United States (USNBC) super middleweight title
22	Loss	18–2–2	Danny Green	KO	3 (12), 1:21	2007-07-18	Challenge Stadium, Perth, Australia	For IBF Pan Pacific, PABA, and vacant IBO Asia Pacific light heavyweight titles
21	Win	18–1–2	Brock Stodden	TKO	3 (8), 1:03	2007-06-08	Radisson Hotel, Sacramento, California, U.S.	
20	Win	17–1–2	Mike Nevitt	TKO	7 (12), 0:24	2007-04-20	Cicero Stadium, Cicero, Illinois, U.S.	Won WBO-NABO light heavyweight title
19	Win	16–1–2	Marcus Pernell	UD	8	2007-02-09	Desert Diamond Casino, Tucson, Arizona, U.S.	
18	Win	15–1–2	Juan Carlos Sanchez	UD	6	2006-11-30	ARCO Arena, Sacramento, California, U.S.	
17	Win	14–1–2	Nelson Zepeda	UD	6	2006-08-25	ARCO Arena, Sacramento, California, U.S.	
16	Win	13–1–2	Mike Word	UD	8	2006-06-16	Radisson Hotel, Sacramento, California, U.S.	
15	Win	12–1–2	Ernesto Castaneda	SD	6	2006-04-21	ARCO Arena, Sacramento, California, U.S.	
14	Win	11–1–2	Matt Gockel	TKO	1 (6), 0:48	2006-01-27	Desert Diamond Casino, Tucson, Arizona, U.S.	
13	Win	10–1–2	Richard Paige	UD	8	2005-11-17	ARCO Arena, Sacramento, California, U.S.	
12	Win	9–1–2	Moses Matovu	UD	6	2005-09-30	Cache Creek Casino Resort, Brooks, California, U.S.	
11	Win	8–1–2	Roberto Baro	SD	8	2005-09-01	Desert Diamond Casino, Tucson, Arizona, U.S.	
10	Win	7–1–2	Sheldon Callum	DQ	5 (6), 2:11	2005-07-30	Desert Diamond Casino, Tucson, Arizona, U.S.	
9	Draw	6–1–2	Moses Matovu	PTS	4	2005-05-27	ARCO Arena, Sacramento, California, U.S.	
8	Win	6–1–1	Doug Lilly	KO	1 (4)	2005-04-29	Radisson Hotel, Sacramento, California, U.S.	
7	Win	5–1–1	JJ McAllister	TKO	2 (4)	2005-04-21	ARCO Arena, Sacramento, California, U.S.	
6	Win	4–1–1	James Sundin	TKO	2 (8), 2:25	2004-02-03	ARCO Arena, Sacramento, California, U.S.	
5	Win	3–1–1	David Pareja	UD	6	2004-07-25	Los Angeles, California, U.S.	
4	Win	2–1–1	Jimmy Mince	TKO	4 (4), 0:59	2004-07-22	Los Angeles, California, U.S.	
3	Draw	1–1–1	Mohamed Elmahmoud	PTS	4	2004-07-18	Los Angeles, California, U.S.	
2	Win	1–1	Mike Vallejo	UD	4	2004-07-16	Los Angeles, California, U.S.	
1	Loss	0–1	Jimmy Mince	SD	4	2004-07-11	Los Angeles, California, U.S.	
