= Jermain Mackey =

Bahamian boxer (born 1979)

Personal information
- Nickname: Choo Choo
- Nationality: Bahamian
- Born: 27 December 1979 (age 46) Nassau, Bahamas
- Height: 6 ft 1 in (185 cm)
- Weight: middleweight/super middleweight/light heavyweight

Boxing career
- Stance: Southpaw

Boxing record
- Total fights: 27
- Wins: 19(KO 15)
- Losses: 8 (KO 3)

Jermain "Choo Choo" Mackey (born 27 December 1979) is a Bahamian professional boxer of the 2000s and 2010s who won the Bahamas super middleweight title, World Boxing Council (WBC) Caribbean Boxing Federation (CABOFE) super middleweight title, World Boxing Association (WBA) Fedecaribe super middleweight title, Commonwealth super middleweight title, and was a challenger for the World Boxing Organization (WBO) North American Boxing Organization (NABO) super middleweight title against Jean Pascal, WBC International super middleweight title against Adonis Stevenson, and World Boxing Association Fedelatin super middleweight title against Kirt Sinnette, his professional fighting weight varied from welterweight to light heavyweight. He represented the Bahamas at the 2002 Commonwealth Games.

== Early life and amateur career ==
Mackey was born in Nassau, The Bahamas.

Mackey trained with Ray Minus Jr., beginning at a gym located near his home. As an amateur, he became a four-time gold medallist at the Caribbean Amateur Boxing Association Championships and won the Senior Boxer-of-the-Year award at the Ray Minus Boxing Club in 2002 and 2003.

== Professional boxing record ==
| 27 fights | 19 wins | 8 losses |
|---|---|---|
| By knockout | 15 | 3 |
| By decision | 4 | 5 |

| No. | Result | Record | Opponent | Type | Round, time | Date | Location | Notes |
|---|---|---|---|---|---|---|---|---|
| 27 | Win | 19–8 | Lloyd Smith | KO | 2 (8), 1:55 | 8 Apr 2016 | Kendal G. L. Isaacs National Gymnasium, Nassau, The Bahamas | |
| 26 | Loss | 18–8 | Schiller Hyppolite | RTD | 6 (10), 3:00 | 28 Mar 2014 | Lac Leamy Casino, Gatineau, Canada | |
| 25 | Loss | 18–7 | Azea Augustama | UD | 8 | 18 Jan 2014 | Casino Miami Jai Alai, Miami, Florida, U.S. | For vacant WBC FECARBOX light heavyweight title |
| 24 | Loss | 18–6 | Yunieski Gonzalez | UD | 10 | 18 Aug 2012 | Doubletree Miamimart Hotel, Miami, Florida, U.S. | |
| 23 | Loss | 18–5 | Kurt Sinette | TKO | 11 (12), 1:37 | 12 Dec 2009 | Woodbrook Youth Centre, Saint James, Trinidad and Tobago | For vacant WBA Fedelatin super middleweight title |
| 22 | Loss | 18–4 | Adonis Stevenson | TKO | 5 (12), 0:20 | 25 Sep 2009 | Bell Centre, Montreal, Canada | For vacant WBC International super middleweight title |
| 21 | Win | 18–3 | Emilio Miller Calletano | TKO | 3 (12), 1:15 | 30 May 2009 | Kendal G. L. Isaacs National Gymnasium, Nassau, The Bahamas | Won vacant WBC CABOFE super middleweight title |
| 20 | Win | 17–3 | Michael Gbenga | UD | 12 | 19 Jul 2008 | Kendal G. L. Isaacs National Gymnasium, Nassau, The Bahamas | Won vacant Commonwealth super middleweight title |
| 19 | Win | 16–3 | Jeremy Yelton | TKO | 4 (10) | 24 May 2008 | Kendal G. L. Isaacs National Gymnasium, Nassau, The Bahamas | |
| 18 | Loss | 15–3 | Reginald Taylor | UD | 6 | 17 Nov 2007 | Casablanca Casino, Providenciales, Turks and Caicos Islands | |
| 17 | Loss | 15–2 | Karo Murat | UD | 8 | 18 Aug 2007 | Max-Schmeling-Halle, Berlin, Germany | |
| 16 | Win | 15–1 | Kurt Sinette | TKO | 2 (12) | 22 Jun 2007 | Kendal G. L. Isaacs National Gymnasium, Nassau, The Bahamas | Retained WBC CABOFE super middleweight title: Won WBA Fedecaribe super middleweight title |
| 15 | Win | 14–1 | Julius Fogle | TKO | 8 (10), 1:58 | 18 Apr 2007 | Clifford Park, Nassau, The Bahamas | |
| 14 | Win | 13–1 | Aníbal Santiago Acevedo | KO | 7 (12) | 1 Feb 2007 | Kendal G. L. Isaacs National Gymnasium, Nassau, The Bahamas | Retained WBC CABOFE super middleweight title |
| 13 | Win | 12–1 | Anthony Osbourne | KO | 6 (10) | 1 Dec 2006 | Nirvana Beach, Nassau, The Bahamas | |
| 12 | Loss | 11–1 | Jean Pascal | UD | 12 | 18 Nov 2006 | Colisée, Trois-Rivières, Canada | For vacant WBO-NABO super middleweight title |
| 11 | Win | 11–0 | Marcus Thomas | TKO | 6 (12), 2:09 | 28 Jul 2006 | Radisson Cable Beach Resort, Nassau, The Bahamas | Won WBC CABOFE super middleweight title |
| 10 | Win | 10–0 | Julio González | TKO | 6 (8), 1:26 | 19 May 2006 | Wyndham Resort, Nassau, The Bahamas | |
| 9 | Win | 9–0 | Luis Hodge | UD | 6 | 6 May 2006 | Quay Park, Key West, Florida, U.S. | |
| 8 | Win | 8–0 | Eduardo Carrión | TKO | 5 (8), 1:50 | 10 Mar 2006 | Wyndham Resort, Nassau, The Bahamas | |
| 7 | Win | 7–0 | Delroy Henderson | TKO | 1 (6), 2:57 | 17 Dec 2005 | C.I. Gibson High School, Nassau, The Bahamas | |
| 6 | Win | 6–0 | Marvin Smith | TKO | 9 (12) | 17 Sep 2005 | Wyndham Resort, Nassau, The Bahamas | Retained Bahamian super middleweight title |
| 5 | Win | 5–0 | Marvin Smith | UD | 12 | 20 May 2005 | Wyndham Resort, Nassau, The Bahamas | Won Bahamian super middleweight title |
| 4 | Win | 4–0 | Ricardo Planter | UD | 4 | 25 Feb 2005 | Wyndham Resort, Nassau, The Bahamas | |
| 3 | Win | 3–0 | James Minnis | TKO | 2 | 1 May 2004 | Nassau Stadium, Nassau, The Bahamas | |
| 2 | Win | 2–0 | Steve Vieux | TKO | 1, 1:27 | 27 Mar 2004 | Zoo Night Club, Nassau, The Bahamas | |
| 1 | Win | 1–0 | Eugene Williams | KO | 2 | 28 Feb 2004 | Zoo Night Club, Nassau, The Bahamas | |
