= Adonis Stevenson =

Canadian boxer

Personal information
- Nickname: Superman
- Nationality: Canadian
- Born: Stevenson Adonis; September 22, 1977 (age 49) Port-au-Prince, Haiti
- Height: 5 ft 11 in (180 cm)
- Weight: Super middleweight; Light heavyweight

Boxing career
- Reach: 77 in (196 cm)
- Stance: Southpaw

Boxing record
- Total fights: 32
- Wins: 29
- Win by KO: 24
- Losses: 2
- Draws: 1
Medal record
Men's amateur boxing
Representing Canada
Commonwealth Games
Silver medal – second place	2006 Melbourne	Middleweight

Stevenson Adonis (born 22 September 1977), best known as Adonis Stevenson, is a Haitian-Canadian former professional boxer who competed from 2006 to 2018. He won the WBC, Ring magazine and lineal light heavyweight titles in 2013 by defeating Chad Dawson by first-round knockout, which earned him awards for Fighter of the Year and Knockout of the Year by The Ring.

Known for his fast hand speed and exceptional knockout power, Stevenson was considered one of boxing's hardest punchers during his prime. For more than five years, he made ten successful defenses of the WBC and lineal titles until sustaining a life-threatening brain injury in his 2018 fight against Oleksandr Gvozdyk.

== Early life ==
Stevenson's known name is an inversion of his family name and given name. Born in Port-au-Prince, Haiti, Stevenson moved to Montreal, Quebec with his family when he was seven. By 14 years old, he was living on the streets and soon fell into a violent gang which drew him into a criminal lifestyle. In his early twenties, after a criminal trial in 1998 in Quebec, Stevenson served 18 months of a four-year prison sentence for managing prostitutes, assault, and issuing threats. While in prison, he also pleaded guilty to aggravated assault after putting a fellow inmate into a coma. After leaving prison in 2001, Stevenson vowed he would never return.

== Amateur career ==
Stevenson became the Quebec middleweight champion in 2004, and was named best amateur fighter in Canada in 2005 and again in 2006. Stevenson won the Canadian national title in 2005 and 2006. Stevenson competed in the 2006 Commonwealth Games in Melbourne, Australia, and won the silver medal, losing to local Australian Jarrod Fletcher in the final. It was also the only medal won by a Canadian boxer at the Commonwealth Games.

== Professional career ==
=== Super-middleweight ===
==== Early career ====
A 29-year-old Stevenson turned professional in September 2006. His opponent was Mike Funk, another boxer making his debut, at the Montreal Casino in Montreal, Quebec, Canada. Stevenson knocked Funk out with a hook in twenty-two seconds.

On August 1, 2009, at Windsor Station in Montreal, Quebec, Canada, Stevenson defeated Anthony Bonsante by first round knockout. The two fighters came out of their corners for the fight with Bonsante launching the first attack, but just moments after the assault, Stevenson landed a left hand that sent Bonsante down to the canvas. Bonsante sprawled out on the canvas with his eyes closed, while the referee reached the count of six before stopping the fight. Bonsante had begun to get up at the count of six, but it was too late, leaving Bonsante livid with the decision as he chased the referee around the ring in an attempt to protest the decision, but to little avail. He also won a fifth-round TKO decision against Jermain Mackey on September 25, 2009.

==== Stevenson vs. Boone ====
On April 17, 2010, in his first fight in the United States, which also was his first time fighting for promoter Lou DiBella, he suffered his first defeat being stopped in the second round by Darnell Boone. Boone had been knocked down on the canvas twice in the first round; however, in the second round, Stevenson rushed to Boone without maintaining his defense and he got caught by a solid right sending him on the canvas for the first time in his career. Stevenson managed to get back on his feet inside the count of 10; however, the referee waved the fight off as he deemed Stevenson unable to continue.

==== Return to title contention ====
Nonetheless, Stevenson resumed with GYM Promotions and won the North American title NABA on April 8, 2011, at the expense of Derek Edwards by KO in the third round. He then won by referee stoppage in the first round against Dion Savage (Shujaa El-Amin) on September 17, 2011, and retained his title against Aaron Pryor Jr on December 10, 2011, by referee stoppage in the ninth round. Stevenson jumped from 15th to 2nd position for the IBF title, winning by KO in the first round duel against Jesús González on February 18, 2012. He then fought Noe Gonzalez on April 20, 2012, and won the fight at 1:40 in the second round when the referee stopped the fight.

His next fight originally set to be against Don George with the winner getting a shot at the IBF champion. The fight was originally scheduled to be a co-main event of a fight card also including a match between Jean Pascal and Tavoris Cloud on August 11, 2012, but the even was cancelled due to an injury suffered by Pascal. The Stevenson fight was then moved up to August 17, 2012, and was set to be part of ESPN Friday Night Fights, but Stevenson later injured his hand cancelling the fight. The fight was then rescheduled to October 12. In the fight Stevenson knocked George down twice in the fifth and once in the sixth round before winning the fight with a 12th-round TKO after knocking him down twice more.

=== Light-heavyweight ===
==== Stevenson vs. Boone II ====
On February 4, 2013, it was announced that Stevenson would get the chance to avenge his only loss as a professional against Darnell Boone (19–20–3, 8 KOs) with the fight taking place on March 22 at the Bell Centre. With this fight, Stevenson was risking his IBF mandatory status. Stevenson avenged his only loss, knocking out Darnell Boone with a pair of lefts in the sixth round on March 22, 2013, at the Bell Centre. Stevenson, fighting at 171.9 pounds, forced Boone to take a knee with a right hook to the body early in the sixth, then stunned him coming out of a corner with a left uppercut, followed with a straight left that sent Boone on the canvas.

==== Stevenson vs. Dawson ====
Stevenson moved up to light heavyweight to challenge Lineal/WBC/The Ring champion Chad Dawson (31–2, 17 KOs) on June 8, 2013, at the Bell Centre. In the press conferences leading up to the fight, Dawson called the fight a tune-up, also claiming that he had to Google Stevenson because he had never heard of him. Stevenson hit Dawson with a left hook that dropped him very early in the first round of the fight, and though Dawson got up before the count of eight the referee stopped the fight, giving Stevenson an unexpected knockout victory. Stevenson's victory was his eighth straight since his only career defeat, all coming by knockout. At 174 1/4 lbs., Stevenson was fighting at the heaviest weight of his professional career to date. In the post-fight, Stevenson told HBO's Max Kellerman, "I caught him, and that's a beautiful punch." Dawson admitted, "It was a punch I didn't see. He caught me. That's it. He caught me with a good punch." Dawson suffered his second consecutive stoppage loss. In the 76 seconds the fight lasted, Dawson landed 2 of 16 punches thrown and Stevenson landed 3 of his 15 thrown. Stevenson stated the reason he moved up was due to not being able to secure a world title fight at super middleweight, accusing Carl Froch and Mikkel Kessler of ducking him and fighting each other instead in a rematch. The knockout was voted as Ring Magazine Knockout of the Year for 2013.

==== Stevenson vs. Cloud, Bellew ====
The WBC originally ordered Stevenson to face mandatory challenger Tony Bellew, but was then allowed him to make a voluntary defense first against Tavoris Cloud, where the winner of the fight must face Bellew at a later date.

The fight against former IBF champion Tavoris Cloud (24–1, 19 KOs) was confirmed on August 12, 2013, to take place on September 28 at the Bell Centre in Montreal, Quebec, on HBO. Cloud was entering the fight coming off his first career loss, which came in March 2013 against Bernard Hopkins. Stevenson dominated the proceedings, flustering Cloud with quick hands and shocking power. The fight ended when Cloud failed to answer the bell for the start of the eighth round. Round 7 saw Cloud hurt many times and a cut appearing on his right eye. He was also cut on the left eyelid in the opening round.

Terms were agreed for the fight on July 25, 2013. On November 30, Stevenson defended his light heavyweight title against Tony Bellew (20–1–1, 12 KOs) at the Colisée Pepsi. Stevenson became the first boxer to stop Bellew winning the fight via TKO. In round 6, Stevenson put Bellew down with a left hand, he beat the count and the referee let the fight go on. Bellew was then knocked out standing by another pair of left hands before the referee could get in and put a stop to the bout. At the time of stoppage, Stevenson was ahead on the scorecards 50–45, 49–46, and 50–45. Bellew contemplated moving up to cruiserweight after the loss. According to Nielsen Media Research firm, the fight attracted an average of 1.3 million viewers on the HBO network, making it the 5th most watched bout of 2013.

==== Stevenson vs. Fonfara, Sukhotsky ====
In January 2014, 26 year old Andrzej Fonfara (25–2, 15 KOs) notified the IBF, who had ordered him to fight Dmitry Sukhotsky in a final eliminator, that he would pass on the opportunity because he had agreed a deal to fight lineal/WBC/The Ring champion Stevenson. IBF would instead order Sukhotsky to fight their #3 ranked Cedric Agnew. In February, Stevenson signed a deal with boxing adviser Al Haymon.The fight was scheduled for May 24 on HBO, until HBO cancelled the date from their boxing schedule. On March 25, Michel confirmed the fight would take place on Showtime instead. Stevenson started off very well, dropping his opponent twice with sharp lefts and appeared close to stopping his opponent. Fonfara however, recovered very well, even dropping Stevenson in the ninth round. Stevenson similarly recovered quickly. The two fighters exchanged punches in a good-action final round and the crowd gave the fight a standing ovation. Stevenson won the fight as the judges scored it 116–109, 115–110, and 115–110. CompuBox Stats showed over the 12 rounds, Stevenson landed 329 of 790 punches thrown (42%) and Fonfara landed 217 of his 613 thrown (35%). In the post-fight interview, Stevenson claimed he hurt his left hand in the second round. He added that he was willing to fight Bernard Hopkins or Sergey Kovalev next, but would leave the decision to his manager, Al Haymon. Kovalev's promoter stated that this fight may never happen. That the window has now closed, alleging that Stevenson's age is a contributing factor. The fight, which marked Stevenson's Showtime debut, averaged 672,000 viewers and peaked at 800,000 viewers.

In October 2014, promoter Yvon Michel of GYM announced that Stevenson would next defend his belts against Russian contender Dmitry Sukhotsky (22–2, 16 KOs) in Quebec City, Quebec, at the Colisée Pepsi on December 19, 2014, on Showtime. Sukhotsky was on a four-fight win streak at the time. Michel explained Sukhotsky was selected as Stevenson's opponent because there would not have been enough time to get together and promote a fight with Jean Pascal (29–2–1, 17 KOs). He stated the Pascal fight would likely take place in the Spring of 2015. This was his fourth defense of his titles. Stevenson retained his belts via a fifth round stoppage following a one punch knockout. Stevenson was in control from the opening bell, throwing minimal punches as the crowd started to boo. In round 2, he managed to floor Sukhotsky with a left hand. According to CompuBox Stats, Stevenson landed 80 of 272 punches thrown (29%) and Sukhotsky landed only 23 oh his 136 thrown (17%).

==== Stevenson vs. Bika, Karpency ====
On February 28, 2015 Premier Boxing Champions announced that Stevenson would defend his titles against 35 year old former WBC super middleweight champion Sakio Bika (32–6–3, 21 KOs) on April 4 at the Pepsi Coliseum in Quebec City. It was the first fight to headline PBC on CBS. Stevenson dropped Bika in rounds 6 and 9 en route to winning the fight on the scorecards after 12 rounds, retaining his world titles. The judges scored the fight 115–111, 116–110, and 115–110. ESPN's Dan Rafael scored the fight 120–106 for Stevenson, who dominated the fight using his left hand. Bika failed to make an adjustment and get in much offence of his own. In round 5, Stevenson landed a left which dropped Bika, but referee Michael Griffin ruled it a slip. Bika however appeared hurt. In the post-fight interview, Stevenson said, "I knew he is a tough guy, so I prepared for 12 rounds and I put on a good show. He's never been knocked out, but I dropped him." Stevenson admitted he felt Bika's power and was able to withstand anything that came his way.

On July 27, 2015 Premier Boxing Champions announced that Stevenson would headline a card on Spike TV on September 11 against WBC #9 ranked Tommy Karpency (25–4–1, 14 KOs) at the Ricoh Coliseum in Toronto. Karpency, previously coming off the biggest win of his career, a split decision win against Chad Dawson, the man who Stevenson beat to win the light heavyweight championship. Karpency was thought to be a stepping stone for Adonis, and he was. After barely escaping round 2, Karpency got knocked down at the beginning of round 3. He immediately knocked Karpency down after he got up, and the referee called a halt to the bout, awarding Stevenson a TKO victory in round 3. The fight averaged 581,000 viewers.

In November 2015, citing the fact that Stevenson hadn't faced a top-ranked opponent in the last two years, The Ring Magazine stripped Stevenson of his belt.

==== Stevenson vs. Williams Jr. ====
On May 31, 2016, it was announced that Stevenson would defend his WBC and Lineal titles against 28 year old southpaw Thomas Williams Jr. (20–1, 14 KOs) on July 16 in Quebec headlining a Premier Boxing Champions card. This was Stevenson's seventh defense of his WBC and Lineal light heavyweight titles. Williams weighed in the heaviest of the two at 174.6 pounds, with Stevenson weighing in at 173.6 pounds. In a brief slug fest, Stevenson knocked out Williams in round 4 to retain his titles in his seventh successful defense. Stevenson connected with a hard left to Williams' head in round one that floored him with approximately 30 seconds left, however Williams beat the referees count.

==== Stevenson vs. Fonfara II ====
Undefeated Colombian boxer Eleider Álvarez (22–0, 11 KOs) became mandatory challenger following his win over Isaac Chilemba in November 2015. He then knocked out former super-middleweight world champion Lucian Bute in February 2017 in a final eliminator to become mandatory challenger once again for the WBC light heavyweight title. On February 27, 2017, the WBC ordered negotiations to begin between Stevenson and Álvarez, who are both managed by Al Haymon and promoted by Yvon Michel of GYM for a deal to be reached within 30 days or they would force a purse bid on March 24. Stevenson had a return date scheduled for April 29 at the newly renovated Nassau Coliseum in New York. Promoter Yvon Michel, stated on behalf of Álvarez, that he had averted from his mandatory position to allow Stevenson a voluntary defence.

On April 8, Stevenson revealed on social media that he had finalized a deal to fight Andrzej Fonfara (29–4, 17 KOs) in a rematch from their first fight in 2014. Yvon Michel later told ESPN that the fight would take place in Canada, at the Centre Bell in Montreal Quebec on June 3, 2017. The last time Stevenson fought at that arena was in 2014 against Fonfara. Fonfara was ranked #6 by the WBC at the time. Michel didn't go into detail around why a fight with Sean Monaghan, who he was tipped to fight originally in New York, never materialized, but said, if he continues winning, the fight could still happen. Fonfara started the fight well in round 1, connecting with the jab. Stevenson, who was patient with his left hand, eventually landed a left hook to the head of Fonfara, dropping him to the canvas. Fonfara beat the count, but was on steady legs and when he got backed up to in the corner, the bell saved him from an onslaught. Round 2 opened with Stevenson carrying on where he left of, pummeling Fonfara with huge lefts. The fight came to an abrupt end, when Fonfara's trainer, Virgil Hunter stepped up on the apron after just 28 seconds, motioning to the referee to stop the bout, which referee Michael Griffin did. Stevenson retained his WBC and Lineal world titles. When asked who Stevenson would fight next, he replied, "I'm the greatest at 175. I don't have to call out anybody," On the same card, Eleider Álvarez defeated Jean Pascal via majority decision to remain mandatory to Stevenson.

==== Stevenson vs. Jack ====
After Badou Jack (21–1–3, 13 KOs) defeated Nathan Cleverly in August 2017, to win the WBA 'Regular' light heavyweight title, he began to call out Stevenson, knowing that Stevenson had a mandatory challenger. Stevenson shrugged it off, claiming he was ready for anyone, "It was a good performance. He beat Cleverly now. So now he called me out and I'm ready. I'm ready to fight and I'm ready to unify the title. For Andre Ward or him, I'm ready. It doesn't matter to me [which one]. It's great for me to unify and add another title to my collection. I want to unify the titles. This is my goal and that's what I want to do." On September 8, 2017, mutual promoter Yvon Michel disclosed that there was serious ongoing negotiations between Stevenson and mandatory challenger Eleider Álvarez (23–0, 11 KOs) to fight before the end on 2017. He revealed the fight would take place in Quebec. In September, Michel said that he had a difficult time finalizing a date and venue for the fight, which meant the fight could get pushed to the end of January 2018. He also responded to claims of Jack wanting to fight Stevenson, saying it would only be possible if it were a unification. Michel confirmed the fight would take place on Showtime in January 2018. Michel spoke to Showtime about not going head to head locally with David Lemieux's next fight, which would take place on December 16 on HBO. On November 8, there was rumours stating that Stevenson would once again pay Álvarez a step-aside fee, in order to fight Badou Jack. Álvarez spoke to TVA Sports saying, "I do not think I'm going to fight Stevenson. I do expect to receive that (step-aside offer), and then I will analyze it with my team." On December 1, it was reported that GYM had offered Álvarez a step-aside deal which would give him 'a multi-fight agreement with six-figure guarantee per fight', with Stevenson being part of deal as well. On December 6, the WBC announced that they would investigate into Stevenson's title reign and lack of mandatories. A week later, the WBC stated they would allow Stevenson to avoid Álvarez once again in order to fight Jack. The WBC went on to state they would order Álvarez to fight Ukrainian boxer Oleksandr Gvozdyk (14–0, 12 KOs) for the interim title. Álvarez withdrew from the fight before the purse bid was scheduled on January 12, 2018. On January 24, 2018, Showtime confirmed the fight would take place on May 19 in Canada. The Bell Centre in Montreal was confirmed as the venue.

On April 11, news broke out from Álvarez's manager, Stephane Lepine that a deal was yet to be reached with Álvarez to be properly compensated. Yvon Michel admitted he was working on a deal to keep Álvarez happy and this was the same reason as to why tickets had not yet gone on sale for the Stevenson-Jack fight, which was a month away. On April 18, it was announced that a deal had been reached for Álvarez to challenge Sergey Kovalev (32–2–1, 28 KOs) for his WBO light heavyweight title on HBO. Kovalev was originally scheduled to fight contender Marcus Browne in the summer of 2018, however due to having been arrested for domestic violence, Kovalev's promoter, Kathy Duva of Main Events got in contact with Álvarez's manager Lepine about a potential fight. Due to Álvarez fighting Kovalev, this meant the announcement of Stevenson vs. Jack would be imminent. On April 23, the card was moved from Montreal and instead scheduled to take place at the Air Canada Centre in Toronto, Ontario, Canada. A day later, the official press conference was held to announce the fight.

Stevenson and Jack fought to a majority draw in a competitive bout. One judge scored the fight 115–113 in favor of Jack, whilst the remaining two judges overruled the decision, scoring the fight 114–114. Stevenson outpointed Jack in the early rounds being more active, however from round 5, it was Jack who was the busier and accurate of the two. From rounds 7 through 10, Jack out landed Stevenson 114–40 in total shots landed. It was in round 10 were Jack was hurt from multiple body shots from Stevenson's right hand. Stevenson carried the momentum into round 11 but it was Jack who finished the fight stronger. In round 7, Stevenson complained to referee Ian John Lewis about low blows and in round 8, Jack was warned. Jack later explained Stevenson's cup was low, hence why the shots looked like low blows. With the draw, Stevenson retained his WBC and Lineal titles for the ninth time. Jack was ranked as #1 at light heavyweight by the WBC at the time.

During the post fight interviews, Stevenson told Steve Gray, "I won the fight because I hurt him in the body. I hurt him in the body and he got slowed down. I kept the pressure on him. He was moving and moving – slick, slick – but I touched him more of the time and I think I won this fight." Speaking on the 3rd draw in his last 4 fights (before Bute was DQ'd for failed drug test), Jack stated, "I have no idea. It could be they're jealous of Floyd (Mayweather). I'm one of Floyd's top fighters. Maybe they don't like Floyd. Maybe they're trying to – you know, I don't know. To be honest, I don't know. I've gotta thank God for everything. ... I can't do anything about it. I thought I definitely won the fight, definitely won the fight. Nobody's complaining and no judge had him winning." According to CompuBox Stats, Stevenson landed 165 of 622 punches thrown (27%), 87 of which were power shots landed to the body and Jack landed 209 of his 549 thrown (38%) The fight averaged 535,000 viewers and peaked at 611,000 viewers on Showtime. The fight aired on pay-per-view in Canada.

==== Stevenson vs. Gvozdyk ====
On June 18, 2018, the WBC ordered Stevenson to make a mandatory defence against interim champion Oleksandr Gvozdyk (15–0, 12 KOs). In case a deal could not be reached, purse bids were set for July 2, 2018, where the split of 65/35 would be in favour of Stevenson. Yvon Michel of GYM won the rights to promote the fight with the winning bid of $2.1 million. He stated the fight was being targeted for November 3, 2018, in Quebec. Top Rank made a bid of $1.65 million. There was controversy surrounding the purse bids and claims of collusion by Top Rank. Initially, the bid was won by Phil Weiss on behalf of Tom Brown's TGB Promotions, with the winning bid at $3.102 million. TGB Promotions was known at the time for having close ties with Al Haymon, who was also the advisor of Stevenson. According to reports, the winning bid was withdrawn just minutes later. The next highest bidder, Michel, automatically won the bid, winning the rights to the fight. The WBC stated they would look into the claims. On July 6, the WBC upheld the purse bid giving Michel the promotional rights, however also stated they would impose punishment on TGB promotions of some sort. WBC president tweeted the bout would take place on December 1, 2018. Showtime confirmed they would televise the bout, which took place at Videotron Centre in Quebec, before the Deontay Wilder-Tyson Fury PPV telecast at the Staples Center in Los Angeles, California.

Gvozdyk ended Stevenson's five-year reign as champion by stopping him in round 11 by TKO to claim the WBC and Lineal titles. Gvozdyk knocked Stevenson down with a counter right hand to the head in the opening seconds of the third round, which was incorrectly ruled a slip by referee Michael Griffin. Gvozdyk was the busier boxer through the mid rounds, using his movement to box on the outside, although Stevenson looked to be landing the better shots in some rounds. In round nine, Stevenson started throwing body shots, with some success, while Stevenson seemed to be fading. In round 10, Gvozdyk was hurt by a left hand that would have sent him sprawling but for the ropes; the referee declined to call a knockdown. In round 11, Gvozdyk unloaded a 10-punch flurry that sent Stevenson down for good, the referee stopping the bout as soon as Stevenson went to the canvas. The time of stoppage was 2 minutes and 49 seconds of the round. At the time of stoppage, Stevenson was ahead 98–92 and 96–94 on two of the judges scorecards and the third judge had it 95–95. Gvozdyk celebrated with his team and trainer Teddy Atlas, but they composed themselves quickly as soon as they realized Stevenson was badly hurt. Stevenson was able to sit back on his stool whilst doctors checked on him. In the post-fight interviews, Gvozdyk said, "This win means everything to me. I've trained my whole life for this, and tonight, all of the hard work was worth it." He also praised his new trainer Atlas. Stevenson began to feel dizzy in his dressing room, and was taken to a local hospital. Atlas ruled the 98-92 scorecard from Canadian judge Jack Woodburn as 'criminal'. Atlas also felt that the referee should not have missed the third-round knockdown, but called Michael Griffin a fair and honest referee.

The morning after the fight, it was reported that Stevenson was in critical condition in intensive care. The following Monday, his condition was changed to stable from critical and was placed in an induced coma. On December 20, despite a Russian tabloid reporting Stevenson had woken up and was seen speaking to family and friends, his promoter Yvon Michel stated he was still unconscious and his health had not improved since being sedated by doctors. He also required 'mechanical assistance' to breathe. On December 22, according to his girlfriend Simone God, Stevenson had woken up. As of February 18, 2019, Stevenson moved to a medical facility in Montreal, Canada, to continue receiving treatment related to his recovery. According to ESPN Deportes, Stevenson is talking and moving, becoming more mobile every day, and is well on the road to recovery.

=== Retirement ===
Stevenson gave his first public interview in June 2019. He was in good spirits accompanied by his partner Simone God. His recover had amazed doctors. He told to TVA Sports, "I'm back, Adonis is back! 'God heard us. When I came home, I said my children's names and they said 'papa, you remember'. You learn to walk, you learn to eat, you learn a pack of business when you're in a coma. That's the hardest thing for me. And I learned, it happened really fast. It's going well, I'm in shape, it's good to be back, we take it day by day." Discussing his future in boxing, he wanted to help young children learn boxing. in October 2019, footage was released from a gym in Canada showing Stevenson hitting heavy bag. Ahead of his unification bout with Artur Beterbiev, Gvozdyk spoke off Stevenson's recovery. He did not feel guilty or burdened of Stevenson's injury. He said, "It’s boxing. Things happen a lot of ways. Or maybe it was because he was 41 years of age. I don’t know what happened." He had not spoken to Stevenson in-person, but had followed his recovery online. He also had sleepless nights thinking of the damage he could have potentially caused.

In January 2021, Stevenson spoke to RDC. He stated he was happy and healthy, although not 100% recovered due to the injury itself. He said boxing saved his life and from the streets. He was grateful to the WBC for making him “Champion of Hope", which was announced at their convention. Stevenson added, “This belt means a lot to me. It is being able to help people who have suffered concussions. I have this belt so I can help people who have problems. God brought me back to help. Boxing saved me. She saved me from the streets. How could I regret something that made me feel good? It was an accident that happened [in the fight with Gvozdyk]."

== Personal life ==
In 2012, in response to questioning at a press conference before a fight, Stevenson admitted to previously serving jail time in Bordeaux, Quebec, on charges of managing prostitutes, assault, and making threats. Stevenson served four years in prison for these crimes, and offenses which took place while incarcerated. Stevenson was released in 2001.

On April 12, 2020, it was reported that Stevenson's mother had filed a lawsuit on his behalf against his former fiancé Simone God. Stevenson and God's relationship ended in December 2019. The lawsuit claims that an amount of $891,000 was withdrawn without permission from Stevenson's personal bank account by God. Yvon Michel, Stevenson's promoter was aware of this and said Stevenson would make a statement himself. He also said the whole situation would not have a big impact on Stevenson's finances despite the loss. It was revealed in December 2018 that God was appointed as provisional administrator of Stevenson's property and only six months later a judge ordered an independent accounting firm to manage Stevenson's assets. Speaking to La Presse, he said:

"I want to help people who have concussion problems. I realized that if they don't have someone to help them, it's easy for people who are vulnerable to be tricked. I was vulnerable. I am not fooling myself, I have been vulnerable. I felt betrayed."

"Simone God, I'm not going to lie, I loved her very much. But she abused my trust. She is a good manipulator. There are a lot of things she has done ... this situation is very hard for me. I thought it was for life, me and her. Wherever I was, she was there."

"You know, when you love the person and you know they will never do anything to you, it hurts. It hurts. Really. She hurt me. But I don't want to start throwing insults through the media, I will let the legal system settle this. When you have had a concussion like that, you realize that family is the cornerstone. Anyone who has problems like that, if they get a chance to see their family, go for it. Its very important."

“When I was with the other [Simone], I was blocked, I couldn't express myself. I can say how I feel now. Before, I was afraid, because she put me in doubt. Now I'm free, free, free. A free man. I have no one left to tell me what to say. I feel that my mother is there for me. I feel surrounded by love with my mother and my family. Mentally, this is something that is good for me and that allows me to recover. I recovered a lot. My mom, really, played a big part in this. I feel better mentally."

God released an open letter on social media. In this letter, she claimed the money she had been accused of stealing, was in fact money towards a property which was due to be finished.

== Professional boxing record ==
32 fights	29 wins	2 losses
By knockout	24	2
By decision	5	0
Draws	1	

No.	Result	Record	Opponent	Type	Round, time	Date	Location	Notes
32	Loss	29–2–1	Oleksandr Gvozdyk	KO	11 (12), 2:49	Dec 1, 2018	Videotron Centre, Quebec City, Quebec, Canada	Lost WBC light-heavyweight title
31	Draw	29–1–1	Badou Jack	MD	12	May 19, 2018	Air Canada Centre, Toronto, Ontario, Canada	Retained WBC light-heavyweight title
30	Win	29–1	Andrzej Fonfara	TKO	2 (12) 0:28	Jun 3, 2017	Bell Centre, Montreal, Quebec, Canada	Retained WBC light-heavyweight title
29	Win	28–1	Thomas Williams Jr.	KO	4 (12), 2:54	Jul 29, 2016	Videotron Centre, Quebec City, Quebec, Canada	Retained WBC light-heavyweight title
28	Win	27–1	Tommy Karpency	TKO	3 (12) 0:21	Sep 11, 2015	Ricoh Coliseum, Toronto, Ontario, Canada	Retained WBC and The Ring light-heavyweight titles
27	Win	26–1	Sakio Bika	UD	12	Apr 4, 2015	Colisée Pepsi, Quebec City, Quebec, Canada	Retained WBC and The Ring light-heavyweight titles
26	Win	25–1	Dmitry Sukhotsky	KO	5 (12) 2:42	Dec 19, 2014	Colisée Pepsi, Quebec City, Quebec, Canada	Retained WBC and The Ring light-heavyweight titles
25	Win	24–1	Andrzej Fonfara	UD	12	May 24, 2014	Bell Centre, Montreal, Quebec, Canada	Retained WBC and The Ring light-heavyweight titles
24	Win	23–1	Tony Bellew	TKO	6 (12) 1:50	Nov 30, 2013	Colisée Pepsi, Quebec City, Quebec, Canada	Retained WBC and The Ring light-heavyweight titles
23	Win	22–1	Tavoris Cloud	RTD	7 (12) 3:00	Sep 28, 2013	Bell Centre, Montreal, Quebec, Canada	Retained WBC and The Ring light-heavyweight titles
22	Win	21–1	Chad Dawson	TKO	1 (12) 1:16	Jun 8, 2013	Bell Centre, Montreal, Quebec, Canada	Won WBC and The Ring light-heavyweight titles
21	Win	20–1	Darnell Boone	KO	6 (10) 2:43	Mar 22, 2013	Bell Centre, Montreal, Quebec, Canada	
20	Win	19–1	Don George	TKO	12 (12) 0:55	Oct 12, 2012	Bell Centre, Montreal, Quebec, Canada	
19	Win	18–1	Noé González Alcoba	TKO	2 (12) 1:50	Apr 20, 2012	Bell Centre, Montreal, Quebec, Canada	Won WBC Silver super-middleweight title
18	Win	17–1	Jesús González	KO	1 (12) 1:39	Feb 18, 2012	Bell Centre, Montreal, Quebec, Canada	Won vacant IBF Inter-Continental super-middleweight title
17	Win	16–1	Aaron Pryor Jr.	TKO	9 (12) 0:43	Dec 10, 2011	Bell Centre, Montreal, Quebec, Canada	Retained NABA super-middleweight title; Won vacant NABO super-middleweight title
16	Win	15–1	Shujaa El-Amin	TKO	1 (8) 1:57	Sep 17, 2011	MGM Grand Garden Arena, Paradise, Nevada, U.S.	
15	Win	14–1	Derek Edwards	KO	3 (10) 1:48	Apr 8, 2011	Bell Centre, Montreal, Quebec, Canada	Won NABA super-middleweight title
14	Loss	13–1	Darnell Boone	TKO	2 (8) 0:17	Apr 16, 2010	Wicomico Youth and Civic Center, Salisbury, Maryland, U.S.	
13	Win	13–0	Jermain Mackey	TKO	5 (12) 0:20	Sep 25, 2009	Bell Centre, Montreal, Quebec, Canada	Won vacant WBC International super-middleweight title
12	Win	12–0	Anthony Bonsante	KO	1 (12) 0:46	Aug 1, 2008	Gare Windsor Salle des Pas Perdus, Montreal, Quebec, Canada	Retained WBC Continental Americas super-middleweight title
11	Win	11–0	Dhafir Smith	TKO	5 (12) 0:40	Apr 5, 2008	Montreal Casino, Montreal, Quebec, Canada	Won vacant WBC Continental Americas super-middleweight title
10	Win	10–0	David Whittom	UD	10	Dec 7, 2007	Bell Centre, Montreal, Quebec, Canada	Won vacant Canada super-middleweight title
9	Win	9–0	Marlon Hayes	UD	8	Aug 3, 2007	Centre Pierre Charbonneau, Montreal, Quebec, Canada	
8	Win	8–0	Alvaro Enriquez	KO	1 (6) 2:00	Jun 8, 2007	Uniprix Stadium, Montreal, Quebec, Canada	
7	Win	7–0	Marcus Thomas	KO	1 (8) 1:23	May 12, 2007	Montreal Casino, Montreal, Quebec, Canada	
6	Win	6–0	Carl Cockerham	UD	6	Apr 14, 2007	Montreal Casino, Montreal, Quebec, Canada	
5	Win	5–0	Etianne Whitaker	TKO	1 (4) 1:47	Feb 10, 2007	Montreal Casino, Montreal, Quebec, Canada	
4	Win	4–0	Eduardo Calderon	TKO	1 (6) 2:00	Dec 11, 2006	Montreal Casino, Montreal, Quebec, Canada	
3	Win	3–0	Bonnie Joe McGee	TKO	2 (4) 1:08	Nov 18, 2006	Colisée, Trois-Rivières, Quebec, Canada	
2	Win	2–0	Ferenc Lankonde	TKO	1 (4) 3:00	Oct 28, 2006	Casino du Lac-Leamy, Gatineau, Quebec, Canada	
1	Win	1–0	Mike Funk	TKO	1 (4) 0:22	Sep 30, 2006	Montreal Casino, Montreal, Quebec, Canada	

== See also ==
- List of light heavyweight boxing champions
- List of WBC world champions

Sporting positions
Regional boxing titles
Vacant Title last held by Jean Pascal	Canada super-middleweight champion December 7, 2007 – June 2013; Vacated	Vacant Title next held by David Lemieux
Vacant Title last held by Ricardo Mayorga	WBC Continental Americas super-middleweight champion April 5, 2008 – September 25, 2009; Won International title	Vacant Title next held by Alfonso López III
Vacant Title last held by Robert Stieglitz	WBC International super-middleweight champion September 25, 2009 – April 2010; Vacated	Vacant Title next held by Nikola Sjekloća
Vacant Title last held by Kingsley Ikeke	NABA super-middleweight champion April 8, 2011 – February 2012; Vacated	Vacant Title next held by Erik Bazinyan
Vacant Title last held by Renan St-Juste	NABO super-middleweight champion December 10, 2011 – February 2012; Vacated	Vacant Title next held by Gilberto Ramírez
Vacant Title last held by Michael Henrotin	IBF Inter-Continental super-middleweight champion February 18, 2012 – April 2012; Vacated	Vacant Title next held by Ünsal Arik
Preceded by Noe Gonzalez Alcoba	WBC Silver super-middleweight champion April 20, 2012 – October 2012; Vacated	Vacant Title next held by James DeGale
World boxing titles
Preceded by Chad Dawson	WBC light-heavyweight champion June 8, 2013 – December 1, 2018	Succeeded by Oleksandr Gvozdyk
Preceded by Chad Dawson	The Ring light-heavyweight champion June 8, 2013 – November 23, 2015; Stripped	Vacant Title next held by Andre Ward
Awards
Previous: Juan Manuel Márquez	The Ring Fighter of the Year; 2013	Next: Sergey Kovalev
Previous: Juan Manuel Márquez; KO6 Manny Pacquiao	The Ring Knockout of the Year; TKO1 Chad Dawson; 2013	Next: Carl Froch; KO8 George Groves
Previous: Juan Manuel Márquez; KO6 Manny Pacquiao	ESPN Knockout of the Year; TKO1 Chad Dawson; 2013	Next: Wladimir Klitschko; KO5 Kubrat Pulev
