= Azea Augustama =

Haitian boxer

Azea Augustama (born August 2, 1983) is a Haitian boxer who qualified for the 2008 Olympic Games at light-heavyweight through a bronze medal finish at the second Americas qualifier. In 2008 he also won the National Golden Gloves.

== Professional career ==
At the 2007 PanAm Games Augustama lost in the quarter-final. At the 2007 World Championships he competed at 201 lbs, while his younger brother Elie competed at 178. Both lost their first bouts, and Azea dropped down to 178 afterwards. His older brother Emmanuel fights at super heavyweight. All three brothers and their father work in a construction company.

At the first Olympic qualifier he was shut out 0-11 by Carlos Negron. At the second, he lost to PanAm Champion Eleider Alvarez in the semifinal bout but defeated Mexican Ventura Vasquez in the all-important third place match. As of October 2007, his record was 60-10.

The Augustamas have lived in Florida since 1990 and Azea won the local Florida Golden Gloves. The other brothers, however, do not possess dual citizenship. In 2008 he was able to compete in the National Golden Gloves Tournament of Champions as a non-citizen and won the tournament.

As of late 2014, Augustama has 20 fights as a professional, with 18 wins and 2 decision losses to Edwin Rodríguez and Denis Grachev.

== Professional boxing record ==
18 Wins (10 knockouts, 8 decisions), 2 Losses (0 knockout), 0 Draw
Res.	Record	Opponent	Type	Round	Date	Location	Notes
Win	18–2	(Dominican Republic) Andy Perez	RTD	3 (11)	2014-11-08	Karibe Convention Center, Pétion-Ville, Haiti	Won vacant WBC Fedelatin light heavyweight title.
Loss	17–2	(Dominican Republic) Edwin Rodríguez	UD	10	2014-10-18	(United States) StubHub Center, Carson, California, U.S.	
Win	17–1	(United States) Cory Cummings	UD	8	2014-06-07	(United States) Casino Miami Jai-Alai, Miami, Florida, U.S.	
Win	16–1	(The Bahamas) Jermain Mackey	UD	8	2014-01-18	(United States) Casino Miami Jai-Alai, Miami, Florida, U.S.	Won vacant WBC Fecarbox light heavyweight title.
Win	15–1	(United States) Rayco Saunders	UD	10	2013-08-10	(United States) Casino Miami Jai-Alai, Miami, Florida, U.S.	
Win	14–1	(United States) David McNemar	TKO	2 (10), 2:59	2013-04-06	(United States) Miami Jai Alai Fronton, Miami, Florida, U.S.	
Win	13–1	(United States) Grover Young	KO	2 (6), 0:55	2012-04-14	(United States) Miami Jai Alai Fronton, Miami, Florida, U.S.	
Win	12–1	(United States) Frank Armstrong	KO	1 (4), 2:33	2012-02-18	(United States) Winston-Salem, North Carolina, U.S.	
Win	11–1	(United States) Billy Bailey	SD	6	2011-04-23	(United States) Stage AE, Pittsburgh, Pennsylvania, U.S.	
Win	10–1	(Guyana) JC Peterson	UD	4	2011-03-11	(United States) Magic City Casino, Miami, Florida, U.S.	
Loss	9–1	(Russia) Denis Grachev	MD	8	2011-01-14	(United States) Magic City Casino, Miami, Florida, U.S.	
Win	9–0	(United States) Reggie Pena	TKO	4 (6), 1;48	2010-10-19	(United States) Seminole Hard Rock Hotel & Casino, Hollywood, Florida, U.S.	
Win	8–0	(United States) William Gill	UD	6	2010-08-28	(United States) Rivers Casino, Pittsburgh, Pennsylvania, U.S.	
Win	7–0	(United States) Adam Collins	TKO	1 (6), 2:54	2010-05-21	(United States) Double Tree Westshore Hotel, Tampa, Florida, U.S.	
Win	6–0	(United States) Kia Daniels	KO	1 (6), 0:54	2010-02-27	(United States) Electricians Union Hall, Miami, Florida, U.S.	
Win	5–0	(Puerto Rico) Amador Acevedo	UD	4	2010-01-22	(United States) Electricians Union Hall, Miami, Florida, U.S.	
Win	4–0	(Dominican Republic) Aneudy Martes	TKO	3 (6)	2009-12-18	Karibe Convention Center, Pétion-Ville, Haiti	
Win	3–0	(United States) Victor Rudd	TKO	2 (4), 1:49	2009-19-9	(United States) Ocala, Florida, U.S.	
Win	2–0	(United States) Ronald Garr	UD	4 (4)	2009-05-16	(United States) Farm Bureau Building, Indianapolis, Indiana, U.S.	
Win	1–0	(United States) Ousman McClain	RTD	1 (4), 3:00	2009-04-24	(United States) Orbit Room, Grand Rapids, Michigan, U.S.	

== Personal life ==
=== Legal issues ===
In 2022 Augustama was arrested for allegedly threatening a mass shooting at a gym in Miami before putting down a deposit for an AK-47 rifle. The gym had previously revoked Augustama's membership.
