= Marcus Thomas (boxer) =

Barbadian boxer (born 1970)

Personal information
- Nickname: Marvelous
- Born: June 10, 1970 (age 56) Bridgetown, Barbados

Boxing career
- Stance: Orthodox

Boxing record
- Total fights: 15
- Wins: 10
- Win by KO: 4
- Losses: 5
- Draws: 0

Marcus Thomas (born 10 June 1970 in Bridgetown, Barbados) is a super middleweight Barbadian boxer who turned pro in 2001. He represented Barbados in the 1992 Summer Olympics, 1996 Summer Olympics, 1991 Pan American Games, 1995 Pan American Games, the 1994 Commonwealth Games and the 1998 Central American and Caribbean Games, where he won a silver medal in the light middleweight category.

== Professional boxing record ==
Result	Record	Opponent	Type	Date	Location	Notes
15	10-5	(Guyana) Joel McRae	TKO	12 Dec 2009	(Trinidad and Tobago) Woodbrook Youth Centre, St James, Trinidad And Tobago	
14	10-4	(Canada) Ian Gardner	KO	30 May 2009	Palooka’s Boxing Club, Halifax, Nova Scotia, Canada	
13	10-3	(Republic of Ireland) Andy Lee	KO	15 Nov 2007	(United States) Compuware Arena, Plymouth, Michigan, USA	
12	10-2	(Canada) Adonis Stevenson	KO	12 May 2007	Montreal Casino, Montreal, Quebec, Canada	
11	10-1	(Barbados) Ricardo Kellman	UD	30 Dec 2006	Garfield Sobers Sports Complex, Wildey, Barbados	won vacant WBC Caribbean Boxing Federation (CABOFE) light heavyweight title
10	9-1	(Guyana) Mark Murray	TKO	29 Oct 2006	Barbados Community College, Bridgetown, Barbados	
9	8-1	(Guyana) Larrex Stewart	UD	1 Oct 2006	Barbados Community College, Bridgetown, Barbados	
8	7-1	(The Bahamas) Jermain Mackey	TKO	28 Jul 2006	(The Bahamas) Radisson Cable Beach Resort, New Providence, Bahamas	lost vacant WBC Caribbean Boxing Federation (CABOFE) super middleweight title
7	7-0	(Guyana) Judah Sealy	TKO	19 Feb 2005	Garfield Sobers Sports Complex, Wildey, Barbados	retained WBC Caribbean Boxing Federation (CABOFE) super middleweight title
6	6-0	(Guyana) Judah Sealy	TKO	30 Oct 2004	B.L.I. Culture Place, Bridgetown, Barbados	
5	5-0	(Trinidad and Tobago) Garfield Quashie	TKO	29 Nov 2003	Garfield Sobers Sports Complex, Wildey, Barbados	retained WBC Caribbean Boxing Federation (CABOFE) super middleweight title
4	4-0	(Jamaica) Delroy Henderson	ND	29 Aug 2003	Garfield Sobers Sports Complex, Wildey, Barbados	WBC Caribbean Boxing Federation (CABOFE) super middleweight title
4	4-0	(Jamaica) Anthony Osbourne	PTS	17 May 2003	YMCA, Bridgetown, Barbados	won WBA Fedecaribe super middleweight title
3	3-0	(Trinidad and Tobago) Ricardo Innes	UD	15 Feb 2003	YMCA, Bridgetown, Barbados	
2	2-0	(Trinidad and Tobago) Kevin Placide	SD	19 Oct 2002	Garfield Sobers Sports Complex, Wildey, Barbados	
1	1-0	(Saint Vincent and the Grenadines) Julian Tannis	KO	28 Jul 2001	Castries, Saint Lucia	Professional debut
