= Andrzej Fonfara =

Polish boxer (born 1987)

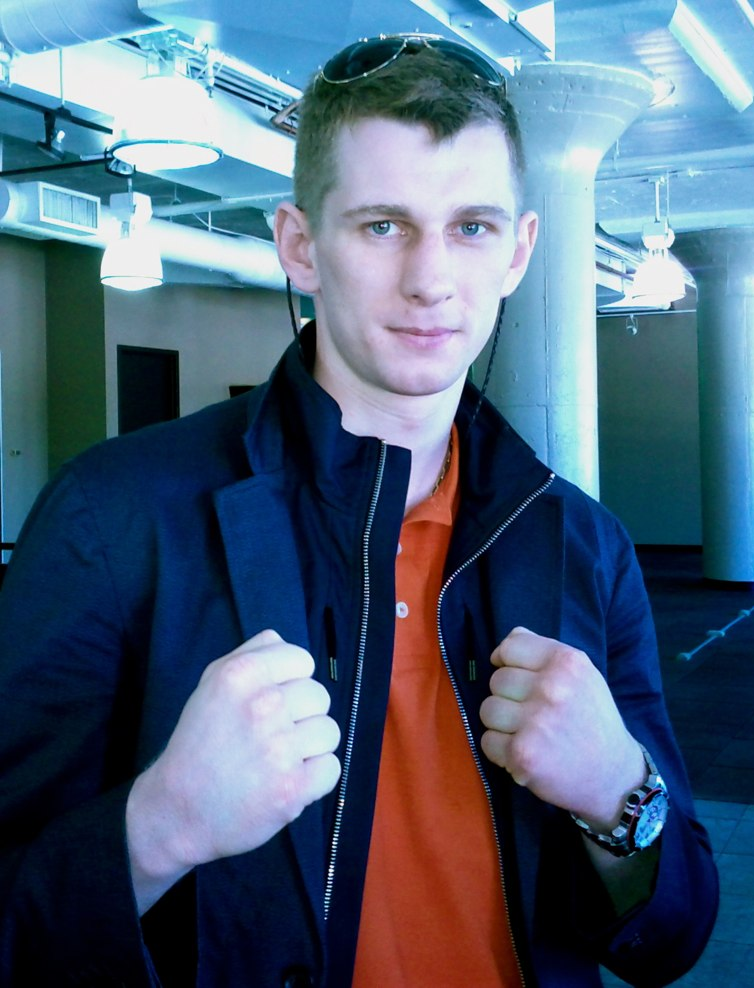
- Fonfara in 2011

Personal information
- Nickname: The Polish Prince
- Nationality: Polish
- Born: 4 November 1987 (age 38) Białobrzegi, Polish People's Republic
- Height: 1.89 m (6 ft 2 in)
- Weight: Super middleweight; Light heavyweight

Boxing career
- Reach: 196 cm (77 in)
- Stance: Orthodox

Boxing record
- Total fights: 36
- Wins: 30
- Win by KO: 18
- Losses: 5
- No contests: 1

Andrzej Fonfara (born 4 November 1987) is a Polish former professional boxer who competed from 2006 to 2018. He held the International Boxing Organization (IBO) light heavyweight title from 2012 to 2013.

== Professional career ==
=== Super middleweight ===
==== Early career ====
Andrzej began his career in boxing by joining the Warsaw boxing club Gwardia Warszawa. His trainers were Jacek Kucharczyk and Jerzy Rybicki. After some time he decided to transfer to another Warsaw boxing club, Legia Warszawa, and this time he trained with Krzysztof Kosedowski, Adam Kozlowski, and Lukasz Landowski. But he didn't stay there for long and transferred back to his original club. This time he was working with Stanislaw Lakomiec with whom he won his biggest trophies. Finally, as a senior he trained with Paweł Skrzecz and Sebastian Skrzecz, and with them he ended his amateur career.

His professional career began in 2006 at Ostrołęka, where he won by majority decision against Czech fighter Miroslav Kubik. After this fight he got a chance to train and fight in the U.S. He currently resides in the U.S. with his family in Chicago and trains with Sam Colonna (Andrzej Golota’s trainer). In 2009 he signed a contract with Dominic Pesoli's 8 Count Productions. That same year, Fonfara tested positive for anabolic steroids. His TKO win over Skyler Thompson was overturned, ending up in a No Contest.

=== Light heavyweight ===
At the beginning of 2010, he decided to move to light heavyweight division which was better suited for his body. In 2010 he won a WBC Youth Championship and in 2011 WBO NABO Title. On September 23, 2011, he won by TKO in the second round against Jose Spearman in his hometown of Chicago.

==== Fonfara vs. Johnson, Karpency ====
Fonfara fought 43-year-old former world champion Glen Johnson (51-16-2, 36 KOs) on June 13, 2012, at Chicago's UIC Pavilion. Fonfara defeated Johnson via a controversial unanimous decision with the three judges scoring the bout 99–91, 97-93 and 97–93. Johnson had some success early landing with power shots and jabs when in range, but Fonfara had the better stamina and speed and worked over Johnson, who was fading, for the final four rounds. Fonfara connected well from the distance with jabs, followed by right hands, and only allowed Johnson a chance when he chose to fight in close. Johnson announced his retirement after the fight. It was the first time Fonfara had been beyond seven rounds.

Following his first major win against Johnson, Fonfara challenged former world title challenger Tommy Karpency (21-3-1 4 KOs) for the vacant IBO light heavyweight title. The fight took place at the UIC Pavilion on November 16, 2012. In front of 4,224 on a Friday night, Fonfara won the vacant IBO title after stopping Karpency in round 7. Fonfara started well until Karpency got in on the action through the middle rounds. In round 7, Karpency slipped and fell on his back, after pleading to the referee to help him up, he eventually got up himself and waved the bout off. Fonfara refused to shake Karpency's hand after the fight. There was bad blood from the beginning of the fight. At the time of stoppage, Karpency was ahead 57-55 on two of the judges' cards, whilst the third judge had it 57-55 for Fonfara. Karpency was knocked down twice in the 1st-round.

On June 10, 2013, it was announced that Fonfara would next fight against Spanish boxer and former world champion Gabriel "EL Chico Guapo" Campillo. The fight would be shown live on ESPN Friday Night Fights on August 16 at the U.S. Cellular Field in Chicago. The IBO did not sanction the bout and stripped Fonfara of the title. The IBF later sanctioned the fight as an eliminator. Fonfara won the bout via 9th-round knockout. The final blow was a left body shot, which dropped Campillo for the 10 count.

==== Fonfara vs. Stevenson ====
In January 2014, Fonfara notified the IBF, who had ordered him to fight Dmitry Sukhotsky in a final eliminator, that he would pass on the opportunity because he had agreed a deal to fight lineal/WBC/The Ring champion Adonis Stevenson. IBF would instead order Sukhotsky to fight their #3 ranked Cedric Agnew. In February, Stevenson signed a deal with boxing adviser Al Haymon. The fight was scheduled for May 24 on HBO, until HBO cancelled the date from their boxing schedule. On March 25, Michel confirmed the fight would take place on Showtime instead. Stevenson started very well, dropping his opponent twice with sharp lefts and appeared close to stopping his opponent. Fonfara however, recovered very well, even dropping Stevenson in the ninth round. Stevenson similarly recovered quickly. The two fighters exchanged punches in a good-action final round and the crowd gave the fight a standing ovation. Stevenson won the fight as the judges scored it 116–109, 115-110 & 115–110. CompuBox Stats showed over the 12 rounds, Stevenson landed 329 of 790 punches thrown (42%) and Fonfara landed 217 of his 613 thrown (35%).

After the fight with Stevenson, he signed a contract with Al Haymon.

Six months later in November 2014, Fonfara made a comeback at the UIC Pavilion in Chicago against fringe contender Doudou Ngumbu (33-5, 12 KOs). Fonfara went the 10-round distance, winning the fight on the scorecards (97-93, 98-92 and 97-93). The fight averaged 413,000 viewers.

==== Fonfara vs. Chávez Jr. ====
Fonfara fought Julio César Chávez Jr. on April 18, 2015, at the StubHub Center in Carson, California, for the vacant WBC International Light Heavyweight Championship. A bout in which Fonfara dominated and dropped Chávez with a left hook to the forehead in the 9th round. Before the 10th round began Chávez told his corner "Stop the fight" making it his first TKO in his career. After the fight, Chávez said, "Yes, I think I won the fight". Some words were lost in translation; he meant to say he felt he was winning the fight at the early stages of the bout. Chávez was behind in all three judges score cards at the time of the stoppage.

==== Fonfara vs. Cleverly ====
On October 16, 2015, Fonfara fought former world champion Nathan Cleverly (29-2, 15 KOs) at UIC Pavilion in Chicago for the WBC International light heavyweight title. Fonfara outlasted Cleverly over 12 entertaining rounds to claim a victory by unanimous decision in the main event of a Premier Boxing Champions card. The judges scored it 115–113, 116–112, 116-112 for Fonfara. Combined, Cleverly and Fonfara set CompuBox records for the most combined punches thrown and landed in a light heavyweight fight, throwing 2,524 punches and landing 936, both CompuBox records. Fonfara (28-3, 16 KOs) also set individual records for a light heavyweight by landing 474 punches and attempting 1,413. Despite bleeding from a grotesquely swollen nose over the second half of the fight, Cleverly never stopped coming forward.

==== Fonfara vs. Smith Jr. ====
It was announced that Fonfara would be defending the WBC International light heavyweight title against 26-year-old little-known Joe Smith Jr. (21-1, 17 KOs) at the UIC Pavilion in Chicago, Illinois, on June 18, 2016, in a scheduled 10 round fight in the main event of the Premier Boxing Champions card on NBC.

In an 'Upset of the Year' in the light heavyweight division, Smith won the title by defeating Fonfara via a 1st-round technical knockout. Smith knocked Fonfara down twice in the round 1. The fight was halted after the second knockdown by referee Hector Afu. The official time of the stoppage was at 2:32. Smith caught Fonfara with a big right hand that dropped him. Fonfara got back to his feet. The referee let the fight continue. When the action resumed, Smith landed a left hook that snapped Fonfara's head back. Smith then followed up with a hard right hand to the head that dropped Fonfara in the corner, which ended the fight. The win also ended Fonfara's 15-fight undefeated streak at the UIC Pavilion. Smith went on to defeat former two-weight world champion Bernard Hopkins via stoppage in December 2017.

==== Fonfara vs. Dawson ====
On February 7, 2017, ESPN revealed that Fonfara would return to the ring on March 4 on the undercard of the Danny Garcia vs. Keith Thurman welterweight unification fight at the Barclays Center in New York. He was scheduled to fight in a 10-round fight against 34-year-old, former world champion Chad Dawson (34-4, 19 KOs), who last fought in April 2016 and having lost 3 of his last 6 fights. Fonfara started training with Virgil Hunter before the fight. Going into the tenth and final round, it was reported that Fonfara was behind on the scorecards. 38 seconds into the round, he landed a straight right to Dawson, which shook him, followed by a combination, which forced the referee to stop the fight and claim the much-needed win. Dawson was also knocked down at the beginning of round 9, but got back up, beat the count, and finished the round. Dawson considered retirement after this fight.

==== Fonfara vs. Stevenson II ====
On 8 April 2017, Adonis Stevenson revealed on social media that he had finalised a deal to fight Fonfara in a rematch from their first fight in 2014. Yvon Michel later told ESPN that the fight was official and took place in Canada, in the province of Quebec on June 3, 2017, Fonfara started the fight well in round 1, connecting with the jab. Stevenson, who was patient with his left hand, eventually landed a left hook to the head of Fonfara, dropping him to the canvas. Fonfara beat the count but was on steady legs and when he got backed up to the corner, the bell saved him from an onslaught. Round 2 opened with Stevenson carrying on where he left off, pummeling Fonfara with huge lefts. The fight came to an abrupt end, when Fonfara's trainer, Virgil Hunter stepped up on the apron after just 28 seconds, motioning to the referee to stop the bout, which referee Michael Griffin did. Stevenson retained his WBC and Lineal world titles. Fonfara agreed with the stoppage and Hunter explained in the post-fight interview, “There was no need to continue. He was hurt in the first round. He survived, but even when he came back to the corner he wasn’t all the way there. I told him in the second round, ‘Don’t even throw a punch. Just defend until you get yourself back.’ These things happen. I thought he was doing quite well until he fell in and got caught with a punch.”

=== Cruiserweight ===
==== Fonfara vs. Sillakh ====
On April 23, 2018, it was reported that Fonfara would return to fight in Poland for the first time since his first professional fight in 2006 at the Hala Torwar in Warsaw on June 16 against former light heavyweight world title challenger Ismail Sillakh (25-5, 19 KOs) at the cruiserweight limit. Going into the fight, Sillakh was 1-3 in his previous four fights. Fonfara defeated Sillakh via sixth-round technical knockout in a scheduled 10 round fight. The ending came when Fonfara unloaded with a flurry of shots that led referee Leszek Jankowiak to stop the fight. The official time was 2 minutes, 14 seconds. Sillakh was also dropped in round 2, however managed to beat the count. At the time of the stoppage, Fonfara was up on the scorecards 49-45, 49-45 and 47-47.

=== Retirement ===
On January 24, 2019, PBC announced Fonfara would fight Edwin Rodríguez (30-2, 20 KOs) on the Shawn Porter vs. Yordenis Ugas undercard on March 9 at the Dignity Health Sports Park in Carson, California. The card was to be televised on FOX and FOX Deportes.

On February 13, 2019, Fonfara announced his retirement from boxing at the age of 31. In a statement to fans, he wrote:

"There is no more enthusiasm, and above all [no more] motivation and adrenaline, which gave the desire to go out into the ring and compete. I am healthy, everything is OK, but I no longer have the heart for boxing. I'm always 100 percent or nothing. I can not do otherwise. Thank you."

Fonfara ended his 13-year professional career with 30 wins, 18 coming inside the distance, and 5 losses.

== Mixed martial arts ==
On August 5, 2023, Fonfara fought in his Mixed martial arts debut at Clout MMA 1 defeating Marcin Najman by TKO in 15 seconds of the first round.

== Professional boxing record ==
37 fights	31 wins	5 losses
By knockout	19	3
By decision	11	2
By disqualification	1	0
No contests	1	

No.	Result	Record	Opponent	Type	Round, time	Date	Location	Notes
37	Win	31–5 (1)	Fábio Maldonado	KO	2 (6), 2:47	20 Jul 2024	Compass Arena, Willowbrook, Illinois, USA	
36	Win	30–5 (1)	Ismail Sillakh	TKO	6 (10), 2:14	16 Jun 2018	Torwar Hall, Warsaw, Poland	
35	Loss	29–5 (1)	Adonis Stevenson	TKO	2 (12), 0:28	3 Jun 2017	Centre Bell, Montreal, Quebec, Canada	For WBC light heavyweight title
34	Win	29–4 (1)	Chad Dawson	TKO	10 (10), 0:38	4 Mar 2017	Barclays Center, New York City, New York, US	
33	Loss	28–4 (1)	Joe Smith Jr.	TKO	1 (10), 2:32	18 Jun 2016	UIC Pavilion, Chicago, Illinois, US	Lost WBC International light heavyweight title
32	Win	28–3 (1)	Nathan Cleverly	UD	12	16 Oct 2015	UIC Pavilion, Chicago, Illinois, US	Retained WBC International light heavyweight title
31	Win	27–3 (1)	Julio César Chávez Jr.	RTD	9 (12), 3:00	18 Apr 2015	StubHub Center, Carson, California, US	Won vacant WBC International light heavyweight title
30	Win	26–3 (1)	Doudou Ngumbu	UD	10	1 Nov 2014	UIC Pavilion, Chicago, Illinois, US	
29	Loss	25–3 (1)	Adonis Stevenson	UD	12	24 May 2014	Centre Bell, Montreal, Quebec, Canada	For WBC and The Ring light heavyweight titles
28	Win	25–2 (1)	Samuel Miller	KO	2 (10), 0:58	6 Dec 2013	UIC Pavilion, Chicago, Illinois, US	
27	Win	24–2 (1)	Gabriel Campillo	KO	9 (12), 1:37	16 Aug 2013	U.S. Cellular Field, Chicago, Illinois, US	
26	Win	23–2 (1)	Tommy Karpency	TKO	7 (12), 0:57	16 Nov 2012	UIC Pavilion, Chicago, Illinois, US	Won vacant IBO light heavyweight title
25	Win	22–2 (1)	Glen Johnson	UD	10	13 Jul 2012	UIC Pavilion, Chicago, Illinois, US	
24	Win	21–2 (1)	Byron Mitchell	TKO	3 (10), 1:03	16 Mar 2012	UIC Pavilion, Chicago, Illinois, US	Won vacant USBO light heavyweight title
23	Win	20–2 (1)	Phil Williams	KO	3 (10), 1:25	16 Dec 2011	UIC Pavilion, Chicago, Illinois, US	
22	Win	19–2 (1)	Jose Spearman	TKO	2 (8), 1:20	23 Sep 2011	UIC Pavilion, Chicago, Illinois, US	
21	Win	18–2 (1)	Anthony Russell	KO	6 (10), 2:46	20 May 2011	UIC Pavilion, Chicago, Illinois, US	Won vacant WBO–NABO light heavyweight title
20	Win	17–2 (1)	Ray Smith	KO	4 (8), 1:04	9 Apr 2011	Prudential Center, Newark, New Jersey, US	
19	Win	16–2 (1)	Adam Jaco	TKO	5 (8), 2:25	28 Jan 2011	UIC Pavilion, Chicago, Illinois, US	
18	Win	15–2 (1)	Anthony Doughty	KO	1 (8), 0:23	19 Nov 2011	UIC Pavilion, Chicago, Illinois, US	
17	Win	14–2 (1)	Roger Cantrell	TKO	4 (10), 1:01	30 Apr 2010	UIC Pavilion, Chicago, Illinois, US	Won vacant WBC Youth light heavyweight title
16	Win	13–2 (1)	Adan Leal	TKO	4 (6), 2:38	29 Jan 2010	UIC Pavilion, Chicago, Illinois, US	
15	NC	12–2 (1)	Skylar Thompson	TKO	2 (8), 2:59	26 Jun 2009	UIC Pavilion, Chicago, Illinois, US	Vacant WBF (Foundation) United States super middleweight title at stake; Originally a TKO win for Fonfara, later ruled an NC after he failed a drug test
14	Win	12–2	Kendall Gould	UD	6	27 Mar 2009	UIC Pavilion, Chicago, Illinois, US	
13	Win	11–2	Terrence Wilson	UD	6	23 Jan 2009	Cicero Stadium, Cicero, Illinois, US	
12	Loss	10–2	Derrick Findley	TKO	2 (8), 3:00	11 Jul 2008	Aragon Ballroom, Chicago, Illinois, US	
11	Win	10–1	Manny Castillo	DQ	2 (6), 1:20	11 Apr 2008	Odeum Expo Center, Villa Park, Illinois, US	Castillo disqualified for an intentional shoulder-butt
10	Win	9–1	Jorge Alberto Gonzalez	MD	6	15 Feb 2008	Cicero Stadium, Cicero, Illinois, US	
9	Win	8–1	Dave Saunders	KO	1 (6), 0:28	26 Nov 2007	Cicero Stadium, Cicero, Illinois, US	
8	Win	7–1	Luis Hodge	UD	6	14 Sep 2007	Congress Theater, Chicago, Illinois, US	
7	Win	6–1	Joshua Rodriguez	KO	3 (4)	13 Jul 2007	Congress Theater, Chicago, Illinois, US	
6	Win	5–1	Justin Danforth	UD	4	13 Apr 2007	Cicero Stadium, Cicero, Illinois, US	
5	Loss	4–1	Eberto Medina	UD	5	1 Dec 2006	Cicero Stadium, Cicero, Illinois, US	
4	Win	4–0	Calvin Pitts	KO	2 (5)	10 Nov 2006	Cicero Stadium, Cicero, Illinois, US	
3	Win	3–0	Johnny Higgins Jr.	UD	4	20 Oct 2006	Cicero Stadium, Cicero, Illinois, US	
2	Win	2–0	Gregory Walker	UD	4	23 Jun 2006	Odeum Expo Center, Villa Park, Illinois, US	
1	Win	1–0	Miroslav Kubik	MD	4	3 Jun 2006	Hala widowiskowo-sportowa, Ostrołęka, Poland	

== Mixed martial arts record ==
Professional record breakdown
1 match	1 win	0 losses
By knockout	1	0
By submission	0	0
By decision	0	0
No contests	0	

Res.	Record	Opponent	Method	Event	Date	Round	Time	Location	Notes
Win	1-0	Marcin Najman	TKO (punches)	Clout MMA 1	August 5, 2023	1	0:15	Warsaw, Poland	Openweight bout.

Sporting positions
Regional boxing titles
Vacant Title last held by Sebastian Wille	WBC Youth light heavyweight champion 30 April 2010 – November 2010; Vacated	Vacant Title next held by Erik Skoglund
Vacant Title last held by Roy Jones Jr.	WBO–NABO light heavyweight champion 20 May 2011 – September 2011; Vacated	Vacant Title next held by Eleider Álvarez
Vacant Title last held by Mark Tucker	USBO light heavyweight champion 16 March 2012 – November 2012; Vacated	Title discontinued
Vacant Title last held by Thomas Oosthuizen	WBC International light heavyweight champion 18 April 2015 – 18 June 2016	Succeeded by Joe Smith Jr.
Minor world boxing titles
Vacant Title last held by Bernard Hopkins	IBO light heavyweight champion 16 November 2012 – July 2013; Stripped	Vacant Title next held by Blake Caparello
