= Yvon Michel =

French Canadian boxing promoter

Yvon Michel is a French Canadian boxing promoter. His company called GYM (Groupe Yvon Michel) is based in Montréal. The 2012 shows in Quebec were called "Fast and Furious". Yvon has promoted several world title champions, most current being: Oscar Rivas, Kim Clavel and Eleider Alvarez. In October 2021, GYM alongside Three Lions Promotions, co-promoted the first WBC Bridgerweight World title in Montreal where Oscar Rivas became the first WBC inaugural champion of the newly created division.

== Roster ==
His boxers include:

- Adonis Stevenson
- Joachim Alcine
- Antonin Décarie
- Herman Ngoudjo
- Custio Clayton
- Marie-Eve Dicaire
- Eleider Álvarez
- Oscar Rivas
