= North American Boxing Organization =

Regional body of the World Boxing Organization

The North American Boxing Organization (NABO) is one of several regulators of boxing that works in North America. The NABO is one of the regional bodies that is part of the World Boxing Organization.

== Current champions ==
Weight class	Champion	Reign began	Days	Record
Mini flyweight	(Mexico) Yudel Reyes	8 April 2022	1349	16-4
Junior flyweight	(Puerto Rico) Jonathan González	21 February 2020	2126	28–4–1
Flyweight	(Puerto Rico) Juan Carlos Camacho	30 September 2024	413	18–1
Super flyweight	(Puerto Rico) Juan Carlos Camacho	6 April 2024	620	18–1
Bantamweight	vacant			
Super Bantamweight	(Mexico) Erik Robles Ayala	16 December 2023	732	16–2
Featherweight	(Mexico) Jorge Mata Cuellar	22 November 2024	390	22–2–2
Super featherweight	(Puerto Rico) Henry Lebron	07 December 2024	375	20–0
Lightweight	(United States) Raymond Muratalla	13 July 2024	522	22–0
Super lightweight	(Puerto Rico) Alfredo Santiago	15 June 2024	550	16–2
Welterweight	(United States) Alexis Rocha	19 July 2024	516	25–2–1
Super welterweight	(Puerto Rico) Xander Zayas	13 August 2022	1222	21–0
Middleweight	(United States) Troy Isley	21 June 2024	544	14–0
Super middleweight	(Puerto Rico) Edgar Berlanga	9 October 2021	1530	23–2
Light heavyweight	(United States) Joe Smith Jr.	11 January 2020	2167	25–3
Cruiserweight	(Canada) Jean Pascal	21 September 2024	452	37–7–1
Heavyweight	(Germany) Agit Kabayel	18 May 2024	578	25–0

== See also ==
- List of NABO champions
