= Bernard Hopkins vs. Sergey Kovalev =

Boxing match

Alien vs. Krusher
- Date: November 8, 2014
- Venue: Boardwalk Hall, Atlantic City, New Jersey, U.S.
- Title(s) on the line: WBA (super), WBO and IBF light heavyweight titles

Tale of the tape
Boxer	Bernard Hopkins	Sergey Kovalev
Nickname	The Alien	Krusher
Hometown	Philadelphia, Pennsylvania, U.S.	Kopeysk, Chelyabinsk Oblast, Russia
Purse	$1,000,000	$500,000
Pre-fight record	55–6–2 (32 KO)	25–0–1 (23 KO)
Age	49 years, 9 months	31 years, 7 months
Height	6 ft 1 in (185 cm)	6 ft 0 in (183 cm)
Weight	174 lb (79 kg)	175 lb (79 kg)
Style	Orthodox	Orthodox
Recognition	WBA (super) and IBF; Light Heavyweight Champion; The Ring/TBRB; No. 1 Ranked Light Heavyweight	WBO; Light Heavyweight Champion; The Ring/TBRB; No. 2 Ranked Light Heavyweight

Result
- Kovalev wins via unanimous decision (120–107, 120–107, 120–106)

Bernard Hopkins vs. Sergey Kovalev, billed as Alien vs. Krusher, was a professional boxing match contested on November 8, 2014, for the WBA (super), WBO and IBF light heavyweight titles.

== Background ==
On August 1, 2014, reigning light heavyweight champions Bernard Hopkins (holder of both the WBA (super) and IBF titles) and Sergey Kovalev (the WBO champion) reached an agreement to face one another in a unification bout. The deal came together at the behest of the IBF, who gave Hopkins a deadline to either except the unification fight with Kovalev or face their number-one ranked contender Nadjib Mohammedi. The deal was contingent on Kovalev first defeating Blake Caparello in a fight that was scheduled only two days after the agreement with Hopkins had been made. Kovalev would knockout Caparello in the second round with Hopkins in attendance, officially putting the fight on.

Prior to agreeing to face one another, both Hopkins and Kovalev had previously pursued a separate unification bout with Adonis Stevenson, who held the WBC's light heavyweight title and was regarded as the lineal champion, also holding The Ring light heavyweight title. Kovalev and Stevenson had a deal in place with cable network HBO that would see Stevenson first make a title defense against Andrzej Fonfara in May and then face Kovalev in September, however, these plans were cancelled when Stevenson, claiming to be unhappy with the money HBO had offered, reneged on the deal and jumped to the rival network Showtime. Hopkins then expressed interest in a fight with Stevenson, calling him out after defeating Beibut Shumenov in April, but a deal was never reached.

The Hopkins–Kovalev fight marked the first collaboration between Oscar De La Hoya's Golden Boy Promotions, who promoted Hopkins, and HBO after a 20-month estrangement following Hopkins' victory over Tavoris Cloud on March 9, 2013. HBO had severed ties with Golden Boy only days after the Hopkins–Cloud fight when HBO's top draw Floyd Mayweather Jr., whose fights Golden Boy had co-promoted with Mayweather's namesake Mayweather Promotions, left HBO to join Showtime.

== The fight ==
Kovalev sent Hopkins down with a right hand to head with a minute to go in the opening round and dominated the remainder of the fight from then on. While Hopkins was able to take Kovalev the full 12-round distance for the first time in Kovalev's career, he spent the entire fight on the defensive, not taking any risks offensively and landed only 65 punches through the course of the fight. Kovalev, though his offense was somewhat stymied by Hopkins defensive approach, he nevertheless landed over 100 punches more than Hopkins, scoring 166 punches out of 585 thrown. Kovalev was named the winner by unanimous decision with all three judges giving him all 12 rounds with two scores of 120–107 and one score of 120–106.

== Aftermath ==
The fight was considered successful, as it was watched by an average of 1.328 million viewers.

== Fight card ==
Confirmed bouts:

Weight Class	Weight		vs.		Method	Round	Notes
Light Heavyweight	175 lbs.	Sergey Kovalev (c)	def	Bernard Hopkins (c)	UD	12/12	^{Note 1}
Welterweight	147 lbs.	Sadam Ali (c)	def.	Luis Abregú	KO	9/12	^{Note 2}
Heavyweight	200+ lbs.	Vyacheslav Glazkov	def.	Darnell Wilson	RTD	7/10
Light Heavyweight	175 lbs.	Vyacheslav Shabranskyy	def.	Emil Gonzalez	RTD	2/10
Super Featherweight	130 lbs.	Eric Hunter	def.	Daniel Ramirez	TKO	6/10
Light Heavyweight	175 lbs.	Nadjib Mohammedi	def.	Demetrius Walker	KO	1/10
Light Heavyweight	175 lbs.	Sullivan Barrera	def.	Rowland Bryant	RTD	4/8
Super Middleweight	168 lbs.	Andrey Sirotkin	def.	Michael Mitchell	UD	6/6
Super Lightweight	140 lbs.	Ryan Martin	def.	Isaias Martin Gonzales	TKO	2/6

^Note 1 For WBA (super), WBO and IBF light heavyweight title
^Note 2 For WBO Inter-Continental welterweight title

== Broadcasting ==
Country	Broadcaster
Australia	Main Event
Hungary	Sport 1
Panama	RPC
Poland	Polsat Sport
United Kingdom	BoxNation
United States	HBO

Preceded by vs. Beibut Shumenov	Bernard Hopkins's bouts 8 November 2014	Succeeded by vs. Joe Smith Jr.
Preceded by vs. Blake Caparello	Sergey Kovalev's bouts 8 November 2014	Succeeded by vs. Jean Pascal
