= Bernard Hopkins vs. Beibut Shumenov =

Boxing match

History at the Capitol
- Date: April 19, 2014
- Venue: D.C. Armory, Washington, D.C., U.S.
- Title(s) on the line: WBA (super) and IBF light heavyweight titles

Tale of the tape
Boxer	Bernard Hopkins	Beibut Shumenov
Nickname	The Alien	
Hometown	Philadelphia, Pennsylvania, U.S.	Shymkent, South Kazakhstan, Kazakhstan
Pre-fight record	54–6–2 (2) (32 KO)	14–1 (9 KO)
Age	49 years, 3 months	30 years, 8 months
Height	6 ft 1 in (185 cm)	6 ft 2 in (188 cm)
Weight	172 lb (78 kg)	175 lb (79 kg)
Style	Orthodox	Orthodox
Recognition	IBF; Light Heavyweight Champion; The Ring/TBRB; No. 1 Ranked Light Heavyweight	WBA (Super) and IBA; Light Heavyweight Champion; The Ring; No. 4 Ranked Light Heavyweight

Result
- Hopkins wins via split decision (116–111, 116–111, 113–114)

Bernard Hopkins vs. Beibut Shumenov, billed as History at the Capitol, was a professional boxing match contested on April 19, 2014, for the WBA (super), IBF and IBA light heavyweight titles.

== Background ==
In February 2014, it was announced that reigning IBF light heavyweight champion Bernard Hopkins and WBA titlist Beibut Shumenov had agreed to a unification bout scheduled for April in Washington D.C., which had been the site of his first world title fight 21 years prior. Shumenov had signed with Hopkins' promotional firm Golden Boy Promotions late in 2013 with his reasoning for joining being to make the Hopkins fight a reality. Shumenov would make his Golden Boy debut in December, easily defeating Tomáš Kovács by third-round knockout with Hopkins in attendance, putting the Hopkins–Shumenov fight on.

Hopkins, who had made boxing history the previous year as the sport's oldest world champion after capturing the IBF title from Tavoris Cloud, was looking to make history once again as the oldest fighter to unify two major world titles.

== The fight ==
Hopkins got off to slow start, losing the first two rounds on all three scorecards, but found his footing in the third and dominated most of the remainder of the fight. After Shumenov came back to take the ninth and tenth rounds, Hopkins would rebound to score his first knockdown since knocking down Joe Calzaghe six years prior, sending Shumenov down to his knees after landing a big overhand right. Though Shumenov was clearly hurt, he was able to continue the fight and survive the round. Following the knockdown, Hopkins would land punches at will for the next round and a half with Shumenov clinching throughout in order to make it to the end of the fight. With the fight going to the judge's scorecards, two judges, Jerry Roth and Dave Moretti, scored the fight for Hopkins with identical 116–111 scores, while the third judge, Gustavo Padilla, shockingly had Shumenov the winner with a score 114–113.

== Aftermath ==
While Hopkins shrugged off Padilla's scoring stating "It's not my job to deal with that", Golden Boy Promotions CEO Richard Schaefer called the scoring "bullshit" and called for Padilla to retire, while ESPN writer Dan Rafael would write that Padilla's scoring "will go down among the worst in modern boxing history." Both Rafael and The Ring's Lem Satterfield had scored the fight 118–109 for Hopkins.

== Fight card ==
Confirmed bouts:

Weight Class	Weight		vs.		Method	Round	Notes
Light Heavyweight	175 lbs.	Bernard Hopkins (c)	def	Beibut Shumenov (c)	SD	12/12	^{Note 1}
Middleweight	160 lbs.	Peter Quillin (c)	def.	Lukáš Konečný	TKO	10/12	^{Note 2}
Welterweight	147 lbs.	Shawn Porter (c)	def.	Paulie Malignaggi	TKO	4/12	^{Note 3}
Welterweight	147 lbs.	Sadam Ali	def.	Michael Clark	KO	1/10
Super Middleweight	168 lbs.	Dominic Wade	def.	Marcus Upshaw	TKO	2/8
Super Lightweight	140 lbs.	Zachary Ochoa	def.	Hector Marengo	TKO	5/6
Super Middleweight	168 lbs.	D'Mitrius Ballard	def.	Quincy Miner	TKO	2/4
Super Welterweight	154 lbs.	David Grayton	def.	Howard Reece	TKO	1/4
Lightweight	135 lbs.	Lamont Roach Jr.	def.	Victor Galindo	UD	4/4

^Note 1 For WBA (super), IBF and IBA light heavyweight titles
^Note 2 For WBO middleweight title
^Note 3 For IBF welterweight title

== Broadcasting ==
Country	Broadcaster
Hungary	Sport 1
United Kingdom	BoxNation
United States	Showtime

Preceded by vs. Karo Murat	Bernard Hopkins's bouts 19 April 2014	Succeeded by vs. Sergey Kovalev
Preceded by vs. Tomáš Kovács	Beibut Shumenov's bouts 19 April 2014	Succeeded by vs. Bobby Thomas Jr.
