= Artur Beterbiev vs. Joe Smith Jr. =

Boxing match

Into Deep Waters
- Date: June 18, 2022
- Venue: The Theater at Madison Square Garden, New York City, New York, U.S.
- Title(s) on the line: WBC, IBF, WBO and TBRB light heavyweight titles

Tale of the tape
Boxer	Artur Beterbiev	Joe Smith Jr.
Nickname		The Beast from the East
Hometown	Khasavyurt, Dagestan, Russia	Long Island, New York, U.S.
Purse	$500,000	
Pre-fight record	17–0 (17 KO)	28–3 (22 KO)
Age	37 years, 4 months	32 years, 8 months
Height	5 ft 11 1/2 in (182 cm)	6 ft 0 in (183 cm)
Weight	175 lb (79 kg)	174 1/2 lb (79 kg)
Style	Orthodox	Orthodox
Recognition	WBC, IBF and TBRB; Light Heavyweight Champion; The Ring; No. 1 Ranked Light Heavyweight	WBO; Light Heavyweight Champion; TBRB; No. 2 Ranked Light Heavyweight; The Ring; No. 3 Ranked Light Heavyweight

Result
- Beterbiev defeats Smith Jr. by 2nd round TKO

Artur Beterbiev vs. Joe Smith Jr., billed as Into Deep Waters, was a professional boxing match contested on June 18, 2022, for the WBC, IBF, WBO and TBRB light heavyweight championship.

== Background ==
On 13 February 2022, Top Rank boss Bob Arum revealed that unified WBC and IBF light heavyweight champion Artur Beterbiev was in ongoing negotiations with WBO champion Joe Smith Jr. The planned three-belt unification bout would take place in the summer, as Beterbiev would be unable to box earlier in the year due to his participation in Ramadan. The two had been set to fight in December 2018 on the Canelo Álvarez vs. Rocky Fielding undercard, however Beterbiev would pull out of the fight and Smith would instead unsuccessfully challenge WBA champion Dmitry Bivol.

In April, following the WBC and IBF decisions to bar fights involving boxers from Russia or Belarus, it was reported that Beterbiev would instead fight as a Canadian in his expected unification bout with Smith Jr. in June. WBC president Mauricio Sulaiman further stressed that Beterbiev had been living in Canada for 15 years, held a Canadian passport, Canadian residency, and a Canadian boxing license. On 4 May the bout was officially announced and would take place on 18 June at the Hulu Theater in New York City U.S.

Speaking in the build up Smith told Sky Sports that he had the power to stop Beterbiev saying "I believe if I get Beterbiev in that position, I'll get him out of there. I'm a good finisher. It's not my gameplan but if it presents itself and it's there, I'm going to do it. It's a great record but it's motivation to me, because if I can be the first one to beat him, to stop him, it's going to skyrocket my career, I know there's a lot of people out there who believe in me. There's people that believe in him. We've just got to get in there on Saturday and see what's going to happen. I possess more determination and heart and power. This would definitely be the sweetest victory of all, if I could pull it off Saturday. There's three world championships on the line, Beterbiev's an undefeated man with an 100% knockout ratio, if I beat him - it's just huge."

Beterbiev was a 7/50 favourite to win, with Smith as a 5 to 1 underdog.

== The fight ==
Beterbiev dominated the bout dropping the aggressive Smith in the closing seconds of the 1st round with a counter right hand. He was up immediately as the round ended. The 2nd round continued to be a slug match with Beterbiev's power and shot placement overpowering the home favourite. Smith was dropped for the second time by a left hook, again Smith was up quickly. However moments after the fight resumed, the WBO champion was on the canvas again after a flurry of punches. He beat the count but appeared hurt and after attempting to slug again with Beterbiev, he was hit with a left uppercut followed by a right uppercut which prompted the referee to jumped in before he could hit the canvas again, giving Beterbiev a technical knockout victory.

According to CompuBox Beterbiev outlanded Smith Jr, landing with 48 of 102 punches thrown (47.0% connect rate) compared to just 11 of 67 (16.4% connect rate) from Smith Jr.

== Aftermath ==
After the fight, Beterbiev said that "I want to be [a] good boxer one day maybe, that's why today was a little bit better than the past, I hope. Joe's a little bit open and more easy for me to get him. Two fighters both have good punch and both tried to get [there] first. This time I'm lucky; I get there first." He would also indicate that he would prefer to face undefeated WBA (Super) champion Dmitry Bivol in his next fight, rather than WBO mandatory challenger Anthony Yarde, stating, "Unification fights are more interesting and motivating, I would prefer to be undisputed."

== Undercard ==
Confirmed bouts:

Winner	Loser	Weight division/title belt(s) disputed	Result
(Cuba) Robeisy Ramírez	(United States) Abraham Nova	vacant WBO Global and USBA featherweight titles	5th round KO
Preliminary bouts
(United States) Bruce Carrington	(Cuba) Adrian Leyva	Featherweight (6 rounds)	6th round TKO
(United States) Jahi Tucker	(United States) D'Andre Smith	Welterweight (6 rounds)	4th round TKO
(United States) Floyd Diaz	(Moldova) Daniil Platonovschi	Super Bantamweight (6 rounds)	Unanimous decision
(United States) Troy Isley	(United States) Donte Stubbs	Middleweight (6 rounds)	6th round TKO
(United States) Wendy Toussaint	(United Kingdom) Asinia Byfield	Light Middleweight (8 rounds)	Unanimous decision
(United States) Jahyae Brown	(Republic of Ireland) Keane McMahon	Light Middleweight (6 rounds)	Unanimous decision

== Broadcasting ==
Country	Broadcaster
United Kingdom	Sky Sports
United States	ESPN+

Preceded by vs. Marcus Browne	Artur Beterbiev's bouts 18 June 2022	Succeeded by vs. Anthony Yarde
Preceded by vs. Steve Geffrard	Joe Smith Jr.'s bouts 18 June 2022	Succeeded by vs. Gilberto Ramírez
