= Bernard Hopkins vs. Karo Murat =

Boxing match

- Date: October 26, 2013
- Venue: Boardwalk Hall, Atlantic City, New Jersey, U.S.
- Title(s) on the line: IBF light heavyweight title

Tale of the tape
| Boxer | Bernard Hopkins | Karo Murat |
| Nickname | The Alien | |
| Hometown | Philadelphia, Pennsylvania, U.S. | Kitzingen, Bavaria, Germany |
| Pre-fight record | 53–6–2 (2) (32 KO) | 25–1–1 (14 KO) |
| Age | 48 years, 9 months | 30 years, 1 month |
| Height | 6 ft 1 in (185 cm) | 5 ft 10 1/2 in (179 cm) |
| Weight | 172 lb (78 kg) | 174 lb (79 kg) |
| Style | Orthodox | Orthodox |
| Recognition | IBF; Light Heavyweight Champion; The Ring/TBRB; No. 1 Ranked Light Heavyweight | IBF; No. 1 Ranked Light Heavyweight |

Result
- Hopkins wins via unanimous decision (119–108, 119–108, 117–110)

Bernard Hopkins vs. Karo Murat was a professional boxing match contested on October 26, 2013, for the IBF light heavyweight title.

== Background ==
Earlier in 2013, Bernard Hopkins had defeated reigning IBF light heavyweight Tavoris Cloud to become the oldest world champion in boxing history. Before facing Cloud, Hopkins had agreed to the IBF's prerequisite that he would face their top contender, the largely unknown German fighter Karo Murat should he win. True to his word, Hopkins quickly came to terms to face Murat just a month after his victory over Cloud admitting that facing the obscure Murat was an "obligation" that he wanted to get out of the way in lieu of a "better option." Originally set for July 13, 2013, that date was cancelled in June after Murat failed to be granted a visa from the United States Department of State. Murat eventually settled his visa issue and the fight was rescheduled for October 19, though Showtime pushed the fight back one week to October 26 to avoid competition with rival network HBO, who were broadcasting a Mike Alvarado–Ruslan Provodnikov fight on HBO World Championship Boxing on that night.

For this fight, Hopkins would discard his previous nickname of "The Executioner" and rechristen himself as "The Alien", in reference to his "supernatural" ability to continue winning fights despite his advanced age. Hopkins complemented his newfound nickname by wearing green accented ring gear as well as an alien mask in place of his customary executioner hood during his pre-fight walk to the ring.

== The fight ==
Hopkins put forth a dominating effort, winning by a very lopsided unanimous decision. Two judges had Hopkins winning all but one round with each scoring the fight 119–108 while the third scored the fight 117–110 (9 rounds to 3). Through the first half of the fight, Hopkins implemented his usual defensive-minded approach, but he abandoned this approach midway through the fight, aggressively attacking Murat and landing a high amount of punches during the later rounds, eventually opening a cut above Murat's left eye.

== Aftermath ==
Hopkins admitted after the fight that he was in fact trying to gain a knockout victory after having not obtained one in almost a decade since his 2004 fight with Oscar De La Hoya.

== Fight card ==
Confirmed bouts:

| Weight Class | Weight | | vs. | | Method | Round | Notes |
|---|---|---|---|---|---|---|---|
| Light Heavyweight | 175 lbs. | Bernard Hopkins (c) | def | Karo Murat | UD | 12/12 | ^{Note 1} |
| Middleweight | 160 lbs. | Peter Quillin (c) | def. | Gabriel Rosado | TKO | 10/12 | ^{Note 2} |
| Heavyweight | 200+ lbs. | Deontay Wilder | def. | Nicolai Firtha | KO | 4/10 | ^{Note 3} |
| Featherweight | 126 lbs. | Braulio Santos | def. | Dave Clark | TKO | 1/8 |
| Super Middleweight | 168 lbs. | Dominic Wade | def. | Roberto Ventura | TKO | 1/8 |

^Note 1 For IBF light heavyweight title
^Note 2 For WBO middleweight title
^Note 3 For WBC Continental Americas heavyweight title

== Broadcasting ==
| Country | Broadcaster |
|---|---|
| Australia | Main Event |
| Germany | ARD |
| United Kingdom | BoxNation |
| United States | Showtime |

| Preceded by vs. Tavoris Cloud | Bernard Hopkins's bouts 26 October 2013 | Succeeded by vs. Beibut Shumenov |
| Preceded by vs. Sandro Siproshvili | Karo Murat's bouts 26 October 2013 | Succeeded by vs. Leo Tchoula |
