= Antonio Tarver vs. Bernard Hopkins =

Boxing match

Fight to the Finish
- Date: June 10, 2006
- Venue: Boardwalk Hall, Atlantic City, New Jersey, U.S.
- Title(s) on the line: IBO, NBA and The Ring light heavyweight titles

Tale of the tape
Boxer	Antonio Tarver	Bernard Hopkins
Nickname	The Magic Man	The Executioner
Hometown	Orlando, Florida, U.S.	Philadelphia, Pennsylvania, U.S.
Purse	$3,500,000	$5,000,000
Pre-fight record	24–3 (18 KO)	46–4–1 (1) (32 KO)
Age	37 years, 6 months	41 years, 4 months
Height	6 ft 2 in (188 cm)	6 ft 1 in (185 cm)
Weight	174 lb (79 kg)	174 lb (79 kg)
Style	Southpaw	Orthodox
Recognition	IBO, NBA and The Ring; Light Heavyweight Champion; WBO; No. 1 Ranked Light Heavyweight; IBF; No. 3 Ranked Light Heavyweight	WBC; No. 2 Ranked Light Heavyweight; WBA/WBO; No. 5 Ranked Middleweight; The Ring; No. 2 Ranked Middleweight; Former undisputed middleweight champion

Result
- Hopkins wins via unanimous decision (118–109, 118–109, 118–109)

Antonio Tarver vs. Bernard Hopkins, billed as Fight to the Finish, was a professional boxing match contested on June 10, 2006, for the IBO, NBA and The Ring light heavyweight titles.

== Background ==
In February 2005, longtime reigning middleweight champion Bernard Hopkins had expressed interest in moving up to light heavyweight to challenge The Ring light heavyweight champion Glen Johnson who had just defeated Antonio Tarver by split decision to claim the title the previous month. Though Johnson welcomed facing Hopkins, the close nature of his fight with Tarver warranted a rematch between the two which Johnson had already agreed to, forcing Hopkins to pivot to another fight while he awaited the winner of the Johnson–Tarver rematch. Hopkins would move on to face Jermain Taylor in July, in what Hopkins expected to be his final fight as a middleweight before moving up to light heavyweight to face Tarver, who had defeated Johnson in their June rematch, in what was planned to possibly be the final fight of his career. However, Hopkins was shockingly defeated by Taylor via a narrow split decision and chose to postpone his the Tarver fight in order to pursue a rematch with Taylor in December, which he also lost. Tarver, meanwhile, would agree to face Roy Jones Jr. on the October 1 date originally set for his fight with Hopkins, defeating Jones for the second time in a row to keep his titles. The Tarver–Hopkins fight was finally announced in February 2006 to take place on June 10 in Atlantic City after weeks of difficult negotiations. Hopkins reiterated that the fight would be his last stating that the fight was "going to be everything I’ve accomplished wrapped up in one night." Tarver, in response, would state "this guy is trying to steal my throne. He is trying to ride out in the sunset with my championships. There is only going to be one fighter to finish in this championship and that's me." Leading up to the fight, Tarver promised that he would knockout Hopkins within six rounds. As a result, Hopkins insisted that a clause be included in their contract that should Tarver be unable to deliver on his promise, he would donate $250,000 to Hopkins' Make-a-Way foundation.

== The fight ==
Hopkins would dominate the fight, easily defeating Tarver by unanimous decision with all three judges scoring the fight 118–109 (10 rounds to two) in his favor. Hopkins used constant movement and pressure to outland the naturally larger Tarver, who appeared to be lethargic and sluggish and was unable to land much sustained offense against the superior defense of Hopkins. Hopkins was credited with the lone knockdown of the fight after landing a right that sent Tarver off balance, causing his right glove to touch the canvas. Tarver ended up throwing more punches but landed only 78 of his 437 thrown punches compared to Hopkins who landed 133 punches.

== Aftermath ==
After his victory over Tarver, Hopkins remained adamant that the fight would be his last stating that he had promised his mother he would not box past the age of 40 unless it was to accomplish his self-imposed goal of moving from middleweight to capture the light heavyweight title, something his idol Sugar Ray Robinson had tried and failed to do in 1952 against Joey Maxim. This retirement would be very short-lived, however, as Hopkins would sign a contract in February 2007 to face Ronald "Winky" Wright that July. After defeating Wright by unanimous decision, Hopkins' boxing career would last another nine years before ending at the end of 2016.

Roughly a year after the fight, Tarver made allegations that there was a "great possibility" he had been drugged prior to facing Hopkins, in turn causing his less-than-stellar performance. Tarver claimed he did not feel like himself on the night of the fight and said he was a "dead man walking" and a "shell" of himself. Though he had no proof and his post-fight urinalysis came back clean he nevertheless argued that "something happened." His poor performance was thought to have stemmed from having lost a massive amount of weight after filming Rocky Balboa earlier in the year. Tarver had weighed as much as 218 pounds portraying the heavyweight champion Mason "The Line" Dixon meaning that he had to lose 43 pounds to get down to the light heavyweight limit of 175. Tarver, though, would downplay his losing weight being a problem before the fight stating "I'm lean, mean, I'm ready to go. I've got no excuses, no problems. I don't have a problem. I'm ready."

== Fight card ==
Confirmed bouts:

Weight Class	Weight		vs.		Method	Round	Notes
Light Heavyweight	175 lbs.	Bernard Hopkins	def	Antonio Tarver	UD	12/12	^{Note 1}
Super Bantamweight	122 lbs.	Israel Vázquez (c)	def.	Iván Hernández	RTD	4/12	^{Note 2}
Super Welterweight	154 lbs.	Andrey Tsurkan	def.	Héctor Camacho Jr.	TKO	8/10
Heavyweight	200+ lbs.	Kevin Johnson	def.	Daniel Bispo	UD	10/10
Welterweight	147 lbs.	Rock Allen	def.	Ken Humphrey	TKO	1/6
Heavyweight	200+ lbs.	Roderick Willis	def.	Willie Palms	UD	6/6
Middleweight	160 lbs.	Jorge Páez Jr.	def.	Travis Hartman	UD	4/4
Heavyweight	200+ lbs.	Dave Brunelli	def.	Jamie Campbell	MD	4/4

^Note 1 For IBO, NBA and The Ring light heavyweight titles
^Note 2 For WBC Super Bantamweight title

== Broadcasting ==
Country	Broadcaster
United States	HBO

Preceded by vs. Roy Jones Jr. III	Antonio Tarver's bouts 10 June 2006	Succeeded by vs. Elvir Muriqi
Preceded by vs. Jermain Taylor II	Bernard Hopkins's bouts 10 June 2006	Succeeded by vs. Winky Wright
