= Bernard Hopkins vs. Joe Smith Jr. =

Boxing match

Final One
- Date: December 17, 2016
- Venue: Inglewood Forum, Inglewood, California, U.S.
- Title(s) on the line: WBC International light heavyweight title

Tale of the tape
Boxer	Bernard Hopkins	Joe Smith Jr.
Nickname	The Executioner	The Beast
Hometown	Philadelphia, Pennsylvania, U.S.	Long Island, New York, U.S.
Purse	$800,000	$140,000
Pre-fight record	55–7–2 (32 KO)	22–1 (18 KO)
Age	51 years, 11 months	27 years, 2 months
Height	6 ft 1 in (185 cm)	6 ft 0 in (183 cm)
Weight	174 lb (79 kg)	175 lb (79 kg)
Style	Orthodox	Orthodox
Recognition	2-division world champion	WBC International light heavyweight champion

Result
- Smith Jr. wins via 8th-round TKO

Bernard Hopkins vs. Joe Smith Jr., billed as Final One, was a professional boxing match contested on December 17, 2016, for the WBC International light heavyweight title.

== Background ==
Hopkins' previous fight had come over two years prior when he defended his WBA (super) and IBF in a unification bout against WBO light heavyweight champion Sergey Kovalev. Hopkins was knocked down in the opening round and would go on to suffer an extremely lopsided unanimous decision loss as he lost all 12 rounds on the judge's scorecards. In a post-fight interview following the fight the almost 50-year old Hopkins revealed that he was "50-50" in regards to retirement and when asked to elaborate his plans later in the night at the post-fight press conference stated "Asking me to fight right now is just like asking a woman that just was in nine-hour labor if she was going to have another baby." Only three days after his loss to Kovalev, Hopkins ended any retirement speculation and announced plans to fight "one more time."

In January 2015, Hopkins expressed interest in moving down to the super middleweight division to either challenge WBA and IBF super middleweight champion Carl Froch for his titles, or face super middleweight contenders James DeGale or George Groves. Froch, who was mulling retirement at the time, decided to vacate his IBF title and declined the chance to face Hopkins, calling such a fight a "lose-lose situation" and stating "If I win people will say 'he beat a 50-year-old man'. If I lose people would say 'what's going on? You've ruined your legacy." With Froch now out of the picture, Hopkins turned his attention to DeGale, who would win the IBF super middleweight title Froch had vacated in May 2015. Negotiations between the two fighters, Hopkins claimed, were in the advanced stages with the fight set to take place in DeGale's native England, however, talks eventually stalled and DeGale instead agreed to make his first title defense against former Lucian Bute. Hopkins would then begin negotiations with then-WBO super middleweight champion Arthur Abraham, with Hopkins going as far to tell USA Today that a fight with Abraham would "absolutely" happen, but Abraham chose to instead face Martin Murray. Hopkins next eyed undefeated unified middleweight champion Gennady Golovkin with the proposed fight happening at the 168 super middleweight limit. Golovkin expressed some interest in the fight, giving it a "50/50" chance of happening and both Golovkin's manager Tom Loeffler and Golden Boy Promotions president Eric Gomez admitted to being engaged in talks about the fight. This fight too fell through when Golovkin instead took a fight with his mandatory challenger Dominic Wade, with Hopkins telling the media that the window to face Golovkin "had closed." With no further announcements regarding a possible opponent, Hopkins reiterated in October his wish for a final fight, though Gomez stated that while they were still looking at opportunities, "absolutely nothing" was set in regards to a possible opponent or date. Just days later, however, Hopkins finally found an opponent after two years of searching, reaching an agreement to face Joe Smith Jr. on December 17, 2016. Hopkins confirmed that the fight would be his last and reverted to his famous longtime nickname "The Executioner" after having used "The Alien" for his three previous fights.

== The fight ==
Smith was able to get off to a strong start, out landing Hopkins 14–4 in punches during the first round and served as the aggressor throughout the fight, backing up Hopkins frequently, who implemented his usual defensive approach. In the second round, an accidental clash of heads opened up a gash above Smith's left eyebrow, though his cut man was able to control the bleeding and it did not become a factor as Smith controlled most of the fight thereafter. The fight came to a bizarre conclusion early in the eighth round. While Hopkins was backed into a corner, Smith landed a right-left-right-left combination that sent Hopkins between the ropes and onto the floor back first. As the referee began to administer the 20-count given to a boxer who has exited the ring, Hopkins was able to get back up at the count of eight, but an injured ankle suffered from the fall prevented him from returning to the ring and was counted out. After some confusion, Smith was named the winner by technical knockout after referee Jack Weiss determined that Hopkins injury had occurred due to a legal punch, becoming the only fighter to score a knockout victory over Hopkins.

== Aftermath ==
In the immediate aftermath of the fight, Hopkins maintained that he had been shoved out of the ring by Smith and felt the result should have been changed to a no contest rather than a TKO victory for Smith, stating "The reason I said I'm upset they are giving Smith the TKO is because the momentum threw me through the ropes, I didn't dive through the ropes." When asked if the disappointing result would lead to him fighting once more, Hopkins reiterated that despite the result, he would not fight again telling HBO analyst Max Kellerman "This is my last fight, I promised it would be, and you come to that point in life where it is final and I'm happy with my retirement."

== Fight card ==
Confirmed bouts:

Weight Class	Weight		vs.		Method	Round	Notes
Light Heavyweight	175 lbs.	Joe Smith Jr. (c)	def	Bernard Hopkins	KO	8/12	^{Note 1}
Cruiserweight	200 lbs.	Oleksandr Usyk (c)	def.	Thabiso Mchunu	KO	9/12	^{Note 2}
Super Featherweight	130 lbs.	Carlos Morales (c)	def.	Charles Huerta	SD	10/10	^{Note 3}
Featherweight	126 lbs.	Joseph Diaz	def.	Horacio García	UD	10/10	^{Note 4}
Middleweight	160 lbs.	Jason Quigley	def.	Jorge Melendez	KO	1/10
Light Heavyweight	175 lbs.	Yamaguchi Falcão	def.	Germán Pérez	TKO	1/10
Featherweight	126 lbs.	Joet Gonzalez	def.	Jairo Ochoa Martinez	KO	4/8
Lightweight	135 lbs.	Christian Gonzalez	def.	Jonathan Perez	KO	3/8
Lightweight	135 lbs.	Jesus Ivan Delgado	def.	Roberto Carlos Rivera	TKO	6/8
Lightweight	135 lbs.	Ryan Garcia	def.	José Antonio Martínez	KO	2/6

^Note 1 For WBC International light heavyweight title
^Note 2 For WBO Cruiserweight title
^Note 3 For NABF Super Featherweight title
^Note 4 For NABF Featherweight title

== Broadcasting ==
Country	Broadcaster
Hungary	Sport 1
Latin America	Canal Space
Panama	COS
United Kingdom	BoxNation
United States	HBO

Preceded by vs. Sergey Kovalev	Bernard Hopkins's bouts 17 December 2016	Retired
Preceded by vs. Andrzej Fonfara	Joe Smith Jr.'s bouts 17 December 2016	Succeeded by vs. Sullivan Barrera
