= Bernard Hopkins =

American boxer (born 1965)

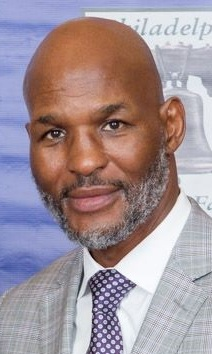
- Hopkins in 2018

Personal information
- Nicknames: The Executioner; The Alien; B-Hop; H-Bomb
- Born: Bernard Hopkins Jr. January 15, 1965 (age 61) Philadelphia, Pennsylvania, U.S.
- Height: 6 ft 1 in (185 cm)
- Weight: Middleweight; Light heavyweight

Boxing career
- Reach: 71 in (180 cm)
- Stance: Orthodox

Boxing record
- Total fights: 67
- Wins: 55
- Win by KO: 32
- Losses: 8
- Draws: 2
- No contests: 2

Bernard Hopkins Jr. (born January 15, 1965) is an American former professional boxer who competed from 1988 to 2016. He is one of the most successful boxers of the past three decades, having held multiple world championships in two weight classes, including the undisputed championship (Note: Four-belt era: World Boxing Association (WBA) (Undisputed version), World Boxing Council (WBC), International Boxing Federation (IBF), and World Boxing Organization (WBO) titles.) at middleweight from 2001 to 2005, and the lineal championship at light heavyweight from 2011 to 2012.

Hopkins first became a world champion by winning the vacant International Boxing Federation (IBF) middleweight title in 1995. He compiled 20 defenses against 17 opponents, with 19 wins as a result of his no-contest bout against Robert Allen. In 2001, Hopkins successfully unified the middleweight division by defeating Félix Trinidad to win the World Boxing Association (WBA) (Super version), World Boxing Council (WBC), Ring magazine and lineal titles. A victory over Oscar De La Hoya for the World Boxing Organization (WBO) title in 2004 cemented Hopkins' status as undisputed champion, while also making him the first male boxer to simultaneously hold world titles by all four major boxing sanctioning bodies. In 2001, Hopkins was voted Fighter of the Year by The Ring and the Boxing Writers Association of America. In 2011, The Ring ranked Hopkins as third on their list of the "10 best middleweight title holders of the last 50 years." As of April 2021, he is ranked by BoxRec as the seventh greatest boxer of all time, pound for pound.

After losing the undisputed title to Jermain Taylor in 2005 and failing to regain it in a rematch the same year, Hopkins achieved further success in 2006 when he moved up to light heavyweight, winning the International Boxing Organization (IBO) and Ring titles from Antonio Tarver at 41 years of age. Two defenses of the Ring title were made before a loss to Joe Calzaghe in 2008. Three years later, Hopkins defeated Jean Pascal for the WBC and lineal light heavyweight titles, as well as regaining the Ring title. This made Hopkins the oldest boxer in history to win a world championship, at the age of 46, breaking George Foreman's record set in 1994. Hopkins later broke his own record by winning the IBF light heavyweight title from Tavoris Cloud in 2013, and again in 2014 when he won the WBA (Super) title from Beibut Shumenov, at ages 48 and 49, respectively.

Nicknamed "the Executioner", and later "the Alien", Hopkins was known for his ability to continue competing at an advanced age. He is considered to be one of the greatest defensive boxers of all time. Hopkins was also known for his Philly Shell, carrying speed and power along with counterpunching skills, and defense. He was able to take advantage of a wide variety of situations in the ring and implement tactics while fighting on the inside or in a clinch.

In the last years of his active career, Hopkins also became a minority partner with Golden Boy Promotions, with which he still remains post-career.

== Early life ==
Born to Bernard Hopkins Sr. and his wife Shirley, Bernard grew up with his family in the Raymond Rosen housing project in Philadelphia. Although he was a promising amateur boxer who won the Philadelphia Jr. Golden Gloves championship at age 9, eventually compiling an amateur record of 95–4, Hopkins turned to crime early in his life. By the age of thirteen he was mugging people and had been stabbed three times. At seventeen, Hopkins was sentenced to 18 years in Graterford Prison for nine felonies. While in prison he witnessed the murder of another inmate in an argument over a pack of cigarettes, but also rediscovered his passion for boxing. After serving almost five years, Hopkins was released from prison in 1988. He then decided to use boxing as an escape from his previous life, and converted to Islam. While Hopkins was leaving the prison for the final time, the warden told him he'd "see [Hopkins] again when you wind up back in here", to which Hopkins replied "I ain't ever coming back here." Later, Hopkins attributed his personal discipline to his experiences and time spent in Graterford Prison.

== Professional career ==
=== Middleweight ===
==== Early career ====
Hopkins immediately joined the professional boxing ranks as a light heavyweight, losing his debut on October 11, 1988, in Atlantic City, New Jersey, to Clinton Mitchell. After a sixteen-month layoff, he resumed his career as a middleweight, winning a unanimous decision over Greg Paige at the Blue Horizon on February 22, 1990.

Between February 1990 and December 1992, Hopkins scored 21 wins without a loss. He won 16 of those fights by knockout, 12 coming in the first round.

==== Hopkins vs. Jones I ====
Hopkins met Roy Jones on May 22, 1993, for the vacant IBF middleweight title. Hopkins was out-pointed throughout most of the fight, en route to losing a unanimous decision. All three judges scored the fight 116–112 for Jones.

=== Middleweight title ===
The IBF came again knocking at Hopkins's door on December 17 of that year, matching him with Segundo Mercado in Mercado's hometown of Quito, Ecuador. Mercado knocked Hopkins down twice before Hopkins rallied late and earned a split draw. It has been argued that Hopkins was also not properly acclimated to the altitude of nearly 10,000 feet.

The IBF called for an immediate rematch, and on April 29, 1995, Hopkins became a world champion with a seventh-round technical knockout victory in Landover, Maryland.

In his first title defense he defeated Steve Frank, whom he stopped in twenty-four seconds. By the end of 2000, he had defended the IBF title 12 times without a loss, while beating such standouts as John David Jackson, Glen Johnson (undefeated at the time), former champion Simon Brown, and knockout artist Antwun Echols.

=== 2001 Middleweight Tournament ===
The arrival of former welterweight and light middleweight champion Félix Trinidad into the middleweight ranks set off a series of unification fights between major middleweight title-holders. The boxers involved in the tournament were reigning IBF champion Bernard Hopkins, WBC champion Keith Holmes, WBA champion William Joppy, and Félix Trinidad.

==== Hopkins vs. Holmes ====
On April 14, 2001, Hopkins won a unanimous decision over WBC champion Keith Holmes in New York City. Trinidad, however, knocked out Middleweight mainstay William Joppy in an impressive five rounds. This led many to believe that Félix Trinidad was simply too much and too strong for Hopkins.

=== Undisputed middleweight champion ===
==== Hopkins vs. Trinidad ====
On September 29, 2001, WBA champion Trinidad challenged Hopkins for the undisputed middleweight championship in Madison Square Garden. The fight was originally scheduled for September 15, but the 9/11 attacks postponed it by two weeks.

For the first time in many years, Hopkins was an underdog in the betting, which led the confident Hopkins to place a $100,000 bet on himself to win the bout. (The $100K came from a sponsorship deal Hopkins had with online casino site Golden Palace; Hopkins even had the GoldenPalace.com website displayed on his back for the fight.) During promotion for the bout, Hopkins caused huge controversy by throwing the Puerto Rico flag on the floor in press conferences in both New York City and Puerto Rico, the latter conference leading to a riot in which Hopkins had to be run to safety from the angry mob.

During the fight, Hopkins was on his way to a lopsided decision victory when, in the 12th and final round, he floored Trinidad. Referee Steve Smoger called a halt to the fight after Trinidad's father (who was also his trainer) entered the ring to stop the fight. It was the first loss of Trinidad's career, and it made Hopkins the first undisputed world middleweight champion since Marvin Hagler in 1987. 'The Ring' magazine and the World Boxing Hall of Fame (not to be confused with the International Boxing Hall of Fame) named Hopkins as the 2001 Fighter of the Year.

He defended the undisputed title six times. Hopkins bested Carl Daniels on February 2 surpassing Carlos Monzón's division record of 14 defenses, 2002, by tenth-round technical knockout; Morrade Hakkar on March 29, 2003, by eighth-round TKO; William Joppy on December 13, 2003, by unanimous decision; and Robert Allen on June 5, 2004, also by unanimous decision.

=== Four belt champion ===
==== Hopkins vs. De La Hoya ====
In the highest-paying fight of his career, Hopkins fought six-division titleholder Oscar De La Hoya for the undisputed middleweight championship on September 18, 2004, in Las Vegas. They fought at a catch weight of 158 lbs, two pounds below the middleweight limit of 160 lbs. Hopkins won the bout by knockout in the ninth round with a left hook to the body and thus became the first boxer ever to unify the titles of all four major sanctioning bodies. At the time of the stoppage, Hopkins was ahead on two of the scorecards, with De La Hoya ahead on the other. Hopkins earned a career high of $10 million and De La Hoya made $30 million.

In November 2004, De la Hoya invited Hopkins to join his boxing promotional firm, Golden Boy Promotions, as president of its new East Coast chapter.

At 40 years old, an age at which most boxers are retired, Hopkins reached the middleweight record at the time of 19 consecutive title defenses on February 19, 2005, against ranked #1 WBC contender Howard Eastman, the European middleweight champion. Hopkins dominated the fight from start to finish, winning 119–110, 117–111 and 116–112.

==== Hopkins vs. Taylor ====
In his next fight on July 16, 2005, Hopkins lost his undisputed middleweight championship to Jermain Taylor via a split decision. Hopkins started slowly but came on strong over the final four rounds. Many press row writers scored the fight for Hopkins. Five months later, Hopkins and Taylor had a rematch, Taylor winning again, this time by unanimous decision.

=== Light heavyweight ===
==== Hopkins vs. Tarver ====
Following his two losses to Jermain Taylor, Hopkins at 41 decided not to retire and made the decision to jump two weight divisions to face off against The Ring light heavyweight champion Antonio Tarver on June 10, 2006. Going into the fight, Tarver was a 3-to-1 favorite and had been the first man ever to TKO Roy Jones Jr. Many now placed Tarver among the sports top competitors. He was constantly ranked in the P4P rankings. However, Bernard Hopkins picked up a lopsided unanimous decision, scoring 118–109 on all three judges scorecards.

Antonio Tarver also lost a $250,000 bet with Hopkins, after he failed to stop Hopkins in the first six rounds.

==== Hopkins vs. Wright ====
On July 21, 2007, at the Mandalay Bay Resort & Casino in Las Vegas, Hopkins defended The Ring light heavyweight championship against former undisputed junior middleweight champion Winky Wright. During the weigh-in, Hopkins shoved Wright with an open-hand to the face, igniting a brawl between both fighters' entourages. Hopkins was fined $200,000 for instigating the brawl. Hopkins prevailed with a unanimous decision victory by scores of 117–111, 117–111 and 116–112.

==== Hopkins vs. Calzaghe ====
On April 19, 2008, at the Thomas & Mack Center in Las Vegas, Hopkins lost The Ring light heavyweight title to Joe Calzaghe via split decision (116–111 and 115–112 for Joe Calzaghe; 114–113 for Hopkins). Hopkins started the fight well, dropping Calzaghe in the first round and using his ring savvy to confuse the challenger. Calzaghe did however quickly adapt to the style of Hopkins and caught up in the middle to later rounds using his superior hand speed and output volume, leading to a split decision win for the Welshman.

==== Hopkins vs. Pavlik ====
On October 18, 2008, Hopkins met middleweight champion Kelly Pavlik in a non-title fight at a catch-weight of 170 lbs. Fans and pundits alike felt that Pavlik, known for his formidable punching power, would become the first man to knock Hopkins out. Pavlik was a 4–1 betting favorite heading into the contest. On the night of the fight, Hopkins turned back the clock to produce a performance he claimed to be the best of his career winning a unanimous decision (117–109, 119–106, 118–108) over the undefeated Pavlik. Hopkins prepared for this fight in the late summer heat at his second home, Danny Hawk's "World Famous" Normandy Gym in Miami Beach, Florida.

During the Ricky Hatton vs. Manny Pacquiao media conferences before their fight on May 3, 2009, Hopkins stated he would be "interested" in a proposed fight with British super middleweight champion Carl Froch.

On December 2, 2009, Bernard Hopkins fought in his home city of Philadelphia for the first time since 2003 beating Enrique Ornelas via 12-round unanimous decision (120–109, 119–109 & 118–110) in what served as a tune-up bout for the 44-year-old Hopkins who had not fought since his October 18, 2008 12-round upset victory over undisputed middleweight champion Kelly Pavlik.

The bout was supposed to be a tune-up for a scheduled March 13, 2010, rematch with Roy Jones Jr. The rematch was later postponed as a result of Jones Jr. falling to a first-round technical knockout loss to Australian Danny Green.

==== Hopkins vs. Jones II ====
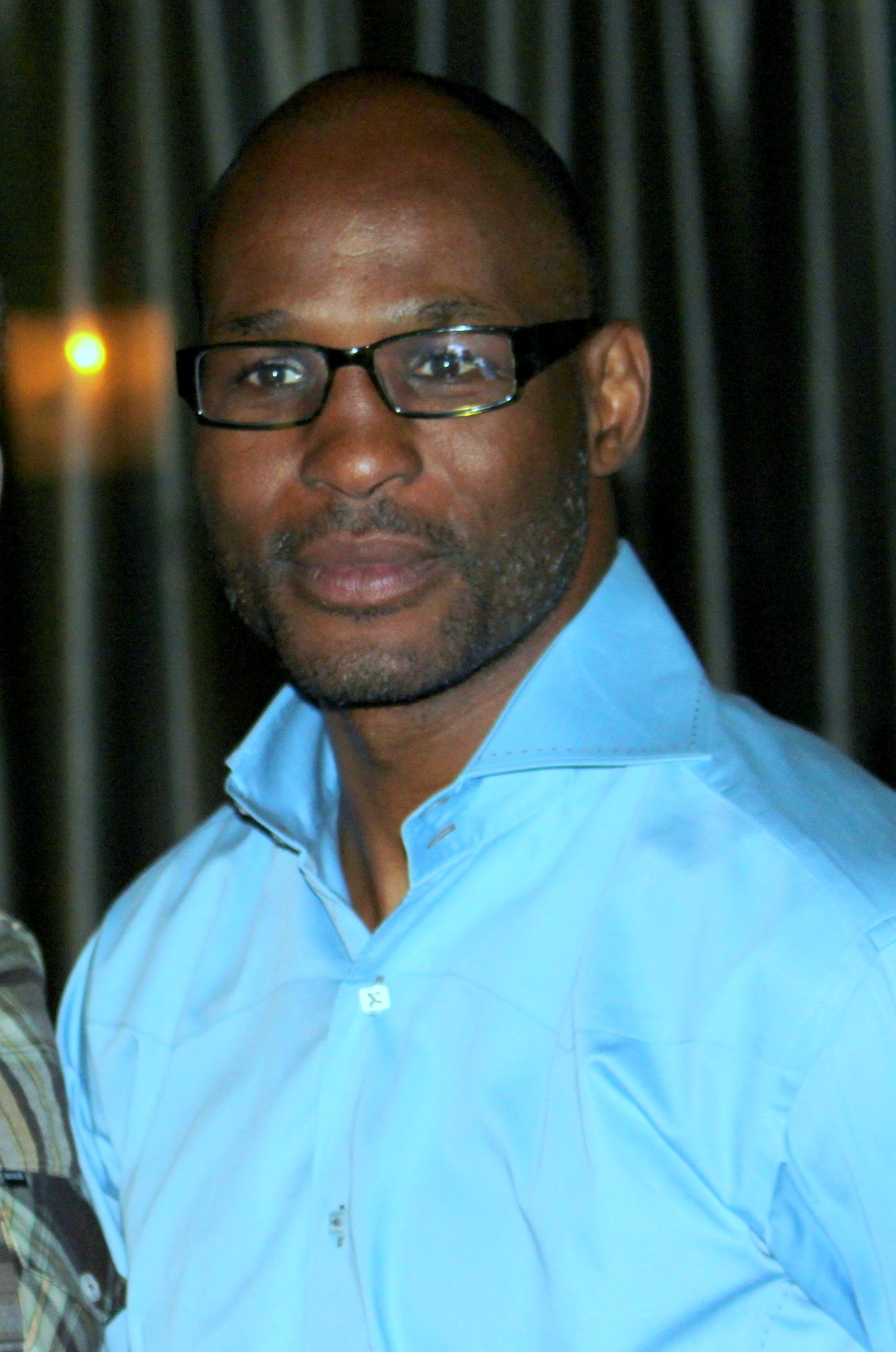
Hopkins in 2010

Hopkins and old foe Roy Jones Jr. agreed to fight in a rematch on April 3, 2010, at the Mandalay Bay Events Center in Las Vegas. The two boxers fought again 17 years after their first bout in 1993. Hopkins defeated Jones by a unanimous decision in a 12-round bout marred by illegal blows and a skirmish at the end of the sixth round involving ring entourage, the referee and security guards. Judges Don Trella and Glenn Trowbridge scored it 117–110 for Hopkins, while Dave Moretti favored him 118–109. The Associated Press had it 119–108, scoring 11 of 12 rounds for Hopkins.

He then challenged WBA heavyweight champion David Haye who had successfully defended his title against John Ruiz. Following Hopkins challenge, Haye ruled out the fight stating Bernard was only looking for a payday. Hopkins later stated his intentions to fight Lucian Bute following Bute's third-round technical knockout victory over Edison Miranda. Golden Boy Promotions also tried to approach retired boxer Joe Calzaghe for a potential rematch in 2010, but Calzaghe, who stated he no longer had the appetite, turned the offer down.

==== Hopkins vs. Pascal I & II ====
At 45 years old, Hopkins fought Lineal/WBC/The Ring light-heavyweight champion Jean Pascal on December 18, 2010, at the Colisée Pepsi in Quebec City, Quebec, Canada. The bout ended in a majority draw decision. Judge Steve Morrow had it 114–112 for Hopkins, but was overruled by Claude Paquette (113–113) and Daniel Van de Wiele (114–114). Following the controversy of the fight, WBC chairman José Sulaimán sanctioned an immediate rematch.

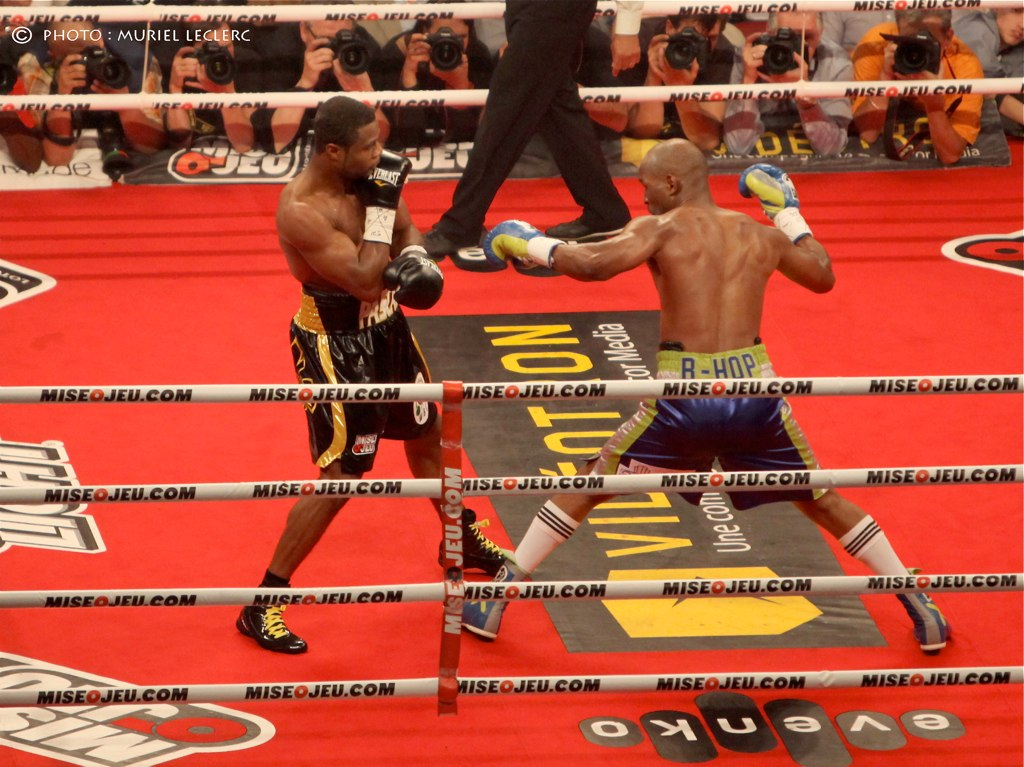
Hopkins (right) vs. Pascal, 2011

On May 21, 2011, at the Bell Centre in Montreal, Quebec, Canada, Hopkins defeated Pascal by unanimous decision to capture the lineal/WBC/The Ring light-heavyweight championships. The official scores were 115–113 from Guido Cavalleri of Italy, 116–112 from judge Rey Danseco of the Philippines, and 115–114 from Thailand's Anek Hongtongkam. With the win, Hopkins became the oldest man in the history of the sport to win a major world title, supplanting George Foreman, who had previously held the distinction after his knockout victory over Michael Moorer. Hopkins won at 46 years, 4 months, 6 days, while Foreman was 45 years, 10 months. After the bout, ESPN columnist Dan Rafael stated: "Bernard Hopkins already had lived several boxing lifetimes, but he was born yet again in Saturday's decision over Jean Pascal, becoming the oldest champion in history."

==== Hopkins vs. Dawson I & II ====
Hopkins told the world of boxing that his next fight was going to be against former champion Chad Dawson. They fought on October 15, 2011. Hopkins lost via TKO for being unable to continue after injuring his shoulder when Dawson threw him off of his back.

After an investigation by the WBC following a protest filed by Oscar De La Hoya, the WBC ruled that Dawson intentionally fouled Hopkins and returned the belt to Hopkins. The Ring magazine also decided to continue to recognize Hopkins as their champion pending the California State Athletic Commission's ruling on a protest filed on behalf of Hopkins. Also on December 13, California State Athletic Commission (CSAC) has ruled that the decision will be overturned to a no-contest upon official review and the testimony of referee of the bout, Pat Russell.

A rematch with Dawson was set for April 28, 2012. Hopkins lost the bout via majority decision, and did not fight again in 2012, making it the first calendar year since 1989 that he did not win a fight.

==== Hopkins vs. Cloud ====
Hopkins made his return to the ring on March 9, 2013, at the Barclays Center in Brooklyn, against IBF Light Heavyweight Champion and Ring No. 2 ranked Light Heavyweight, Tavoris Cloud. Hopkins broke his own record becoming the oldest man in the history of the sport to win a major world boxing title, by defeating Cloud by unanimous decision.

==== Hopkins vs. Murat ====
Hopkins defended the IBF Light Heavyweight Championship against Karo Murat on October 26, 2013. The mandatory title defense was originally scheduled for July 13, 2013, but was later postponed due to visa issues for Murat. In the meantime, the IBF originally made Sergey Kovalev Hopkins's new mandatory challenger, but Kovalev instead faced and beat then WBO champion Nathan Cleverly to win the title, so Murat was reinstated as the IBF mandatory challenger and the bout was rescheduled for October 26, 2013. Hopkins won by unanimous decision with two scores of 119–108 and one of 117–110.

==== Hopkins vs. Shumenov ====
Hopkins fought Beibut Shumenov in a championship unification bout on April 19, 2014, where Hopkins was defending the IBF Light Heavyweight title and Shumenov was defending the WBA Super and IBA Light Heavyweight titles, the latter not on the line for Hopkins. On fight night Hopkins knocked down Shumenov with a jab and followed with a powerful overhand right that nailed Shumenov on the side of the head and dropped him with just over two minutes left in the eleventh round. Hopkins won by split decision with scores of 113–114, 116-111 and 116–111, becoming the oldest boxer in history to unify titles in a weight division.

==== Hopkins vs. Kovalev ====
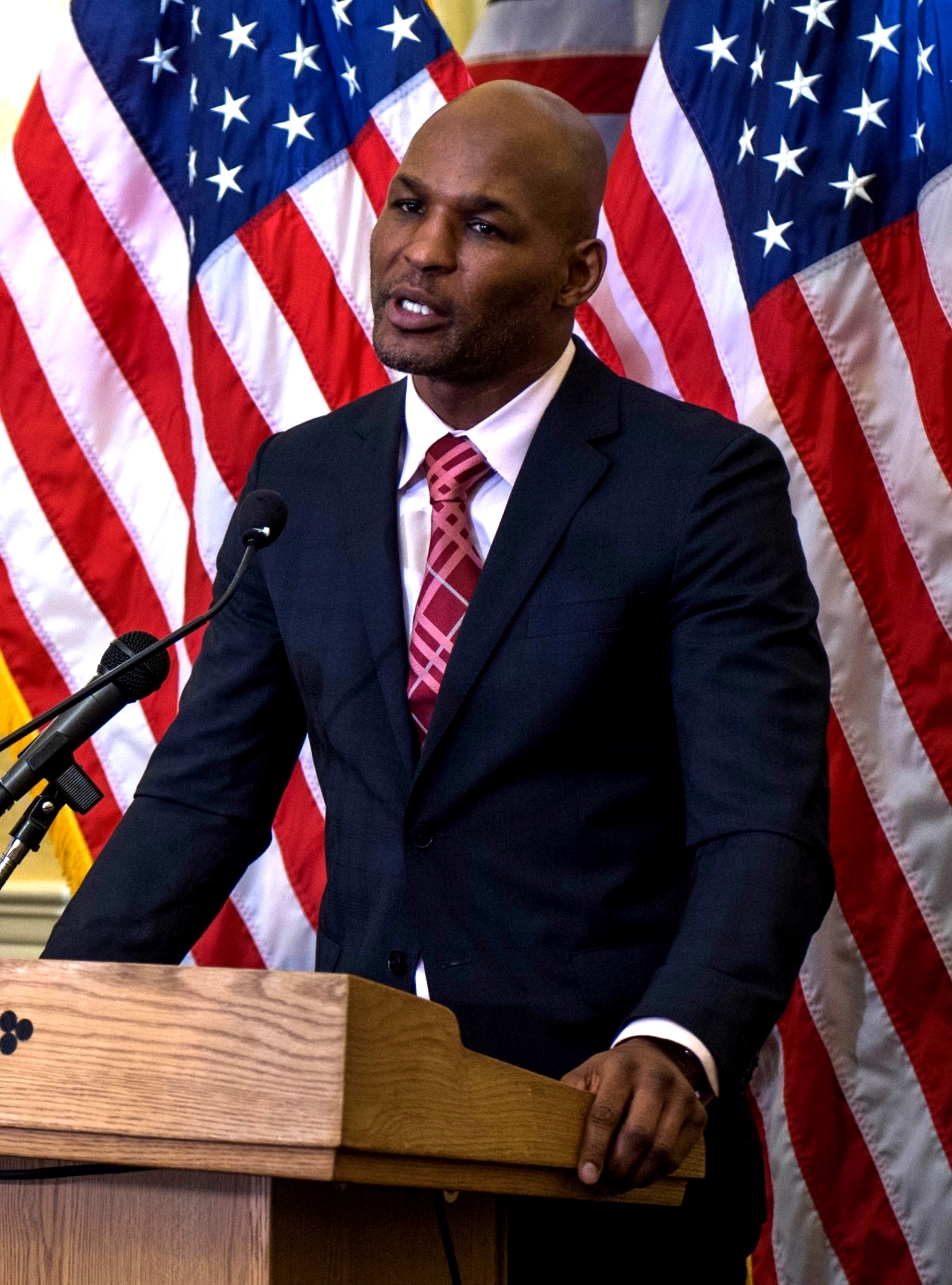
Hopkins at the U.S. Capitol, 2014

Shortly after Sergey Kovalev defeated Blake Caparello in a second-round knockout on August 2, 2014, Hopkins announced he would face the former in a match where his WBA Super and IBF titles would be on the line against Kovalev's WBO title. The match was signed after neither fighter could secure a contest with WBC and lineal champion Adonis Stevenson. The fight took place at Boardwalk Hall in Atlantic City on November 8, 2014, and was televised by HBO; this marked the end of a feud between Hopkins' promoter Golden Boy Promotions and the network which saw HBO cut ties with Golden Boy fighters.

In a one-sided fight, Hopkins was knocked down in the first round by Kovalev. Although he became the first fighter to take Kovalev past eight rounds, Hopkins lost every single round on all three judges' scorecards and took a 120–107, 120–107, 120-106 unanimous decision defeat, losing his titles.

In 2015, Hopkins called out Carl Froch again stating he would like to fight him in a farewell match, only for Froch to decline the offer calling it a "lose-lose situation". Hopkins also eyed James DeGale and Gennady Golovkin.

==== Hopkins vs. Smith Jr. ====
Hopkins made an announcement confirming he wanted a final farewell fight before the end of 2016, which was his first fight in over two years since losing to Kovalev in a lopsided unanimous decision. Hopkins also confirmed he would retire after this fight, whether it be at cruiserweight or light heavyweight, putting an end to his 28-year career.

A deal was made in October for Hopkins to fight American boxer Joe Smith Jr., who last fought Fonfara in June knocking him out in less than 3 minutes. The fight was a HBO main event on December 17, 2016, at The Forum in Inglewood, California. Originally a co-feature with Salido vs. Muira until Salido injured his lower back and pulled out of the fight, making the Hopkins farewell the sole main event of the card. Later it was confirmed that another co-feature fight has been signed, as Oleksandr Usyk would be defending his WBO cruiserweight title against Thabiso Mchunu. Both boxers weighed in at 174 pounds.

Hopkins did not contact trainer Naazim Richardson to train him for his final bout, instead having Kovalev's trainer John David Jackson, a former boxer whom Hopkins defeated in 1997, train him.

On fight night, in front of a 6,513 crowd, Hopkins lost to Smith via TKO when he was knocked out of the ring in the 8th round and failed to make it back into the ring as referee Jack Reiss made a 20 count. Smith Jr. outboxed Hopkins through most of the first seven rounds, then, in the 8th round, Smith caught Hopkins in the corner and landed five shots to the head that knocked him out of the ring. Hopkins said he was hurt and couldn't get back in the ring. He insisted that he had been pushed out of the ring, but replays showed it was not a push. Hopkins said to HBO in the post fight interview, "He shoved me out of the ring. My ankle got twist when I fell out of the ring. I couldn't stand on my feet. If I wouldn't have been pushed out of the ring, I believe he was starting to fade... I can't believe they gave him a TKO. They can call it a no contest but not a loss. The momentum from his body pushed me. I went out like a soldier. I'm not in a denial." Hopkins sat down with HBO's Max Kellerman in the locker room after the fight and confirmed this would be his final fight. Smith Jr. retained his WBC International light heavyweight title. Hopkins' reported purse was $800,000, compared to Smith's $140,000. According to RingTV, the fight averaged 934,000 viewers, peaking at 1.035m on HBO.

== Coaches ==
Hopkins was coached by Philadelphia-based English "Bouie" Fisher from 1989 until their split in 2002 which resulted in Fisher taking Hopkins to court, claiming he was underpaid by $255,000. They re-united in 2003, but split again in 2005, again with Fisher claiming to be underpaid, this time to the tune of $200,000. Naazim Richardson, Fisher's long-term assistant took over as Hopkins' head coach from 2005.

Fisher won the Eddie Futch-John F.X. Condon Award, awarded by the Boxing Writers Association of America, for Trainer of the Year in 2001. He died aged 83 in June 2011. Richardson died in July 2020.

== Statements on race ==
On December 7, 2007, Hopkins and Joe Calzaghe met face to face in the media room set up for the Floyd Mayweather Jr. vs. Ricky Hatton fight. Hopkins and Calzaghe began shouting insults and taunting each other, with Hopkins shouting, "You're not even in my league! I would never let a white boy beat me. I would never lose to a white boy. I couldn't go back to the projects if I let a white boy beat me." Hopkins later explained his comments, saying that it was not meant to be taken as a racial slur or a reflection of his feelings on white fighters, but simply said to create some hype for his fight with Calzaghe. On January 23, 2008, the fight was officially announced to take place on April 19, 2008, at the Thomas & Mack Center in Las Vegas. Hopkins lost the fight.

In late 2010, Hopkins suggested that African American fighters who possessed what he described as a "slick" inner-city style of fighting would be successful against Filipino boxer Manny Pacquiao. "Maybe I'm biased because I'm black, but I think that this is what is said at people's homes and around the dinner table among black boxing fans and fighters. Most of them won't say it [in public] because they're not being real and they don't have the balls to say it. But I do think that a fighter like the Ray Leonards or anyone like that would beat a guy [like Pacquiao] if they come with their game. Listen, this ain't a racial thing, but then again, maybe it is. But the style that is embedded in most of us black fighters, that style could be a problem to any other style of fighting."

On May 11, 2011, Hopkins questioned Minnesota Vikings quarterback Donovan McNabb's racial credentials in a Philadelphia Daily News online article. Marcus Hayes of The Philadelphia Inquirer reported that according to Hopkins, McNabb had a privileged childhood in suburban Chicago and, as a result, is not black enough or tough enough, at least compared with, say, himself, Michael Vick and Terrell Owens. Hopkins said, "He's got a suntan. That's all... McNabb is the guy in the house, while everybody else is on the field... He's the one who got the extra coat. The extra servings... He thought he was one of them."

In late 2013 he again suggested that African Americans possess a "slick" style of boxing which is superior to other styles (presumably practiced by non-African Americans). "The great Sugar Ray Leonard, right now, if he was boxing, the way that they want you to fight, the people that pull the strings of the puppet, he would be boring today. Ray Robinson – the great Robinson – would be boring today...Because the feeders of the people that buy entertainment. They're being fed that if they duck, don't buy it. If they're slick, and they beat [their opponent] nine out of the 12 rounds, and the guy just can't hit him because they were slick and smart enough to hit and not get hit, 'He's not crowd-pleasing, he don't sell tickets.' Because they done fed the followers and they done fed [that] to the customers. The customers will drink anything that you give them if it's promoted right...But when you take away the skill and you take away the slick, and you take away the boxing ability and say that's not entertaining, or that's not entertainment, then, to me, it's like trying to erase a culture that you know has dominated the sport way back then where you were slick. And I'm talking about black fighters. Yes, I said it," said Hopkins, statements released by lobbying firm Axeesys Ltd.

== Professional boxing record ==
67 fights	55 wins	8 losses
By knockout	32	1
By decision	23	7
Draws	2	
No contests	2	

No.	Result	Record	Opponent	Type	Round, time	Date	Age	Location	Notes
67	Loss	55–8–2 (2)	Joe Smith Jr.	TKO	8 (12), 0:53	Dec 17, 2016	51 years, 337 days	The Forum, Inglewood, California, U.S.	For WBC International light heavyweight title
66	Loss	55–7–2 (2)	Sergey Kovalev	UD	12	Nov 8, 2014	49 years, 297 days	Boardwalk Hall, Atlantic City, New Jersey, U.S.	Lost WBA (Super) and IBF light heavyweight titles; For WBO light heavyweight title
65	Win	55–6–2 (2)	Beibut Shumenov	SD	12	Apr 19, 2014	49 years, 94 days	D.C. Armory, Washington, D.C., U.S.	Retained IBF light heavyweight title; Won WBA (Super), and IBA light heavyweight titles
64	Win	54–6–2 (2)	Karo Murat	UD	12	Oct 26, 2013	48 years, 284 days	Boardwalk Hall, Atlantic City, New Jersey, U.S.	Retained IBF light heavyweight title
63	Win	53–6–2 (2)	Tavoris Cloud	UD	12	Mar 9, 2013	48 years, 53 days	Barclays Center, New York City, New York, U.S.	Won IBF light heavyweight title
62	Loss	52–6–2 (2)	Chad Dawson	MD	12	Apr 28, 2012	47 years, 104 days	Boardwalk Hall, Atlantic City, New Jersey, U.S.	Lost WBC and The Ring light heavyweight titles
61	NC	52–5–2 (2)	Chad Dawson	NC	2 (12), 2:48	Oct 15, 2011	46 years, 273 days	Staples Center, Los Angeles, California, U.S.	WBC and The Ring light heavyweight titles at stake; Originally TKO win for Dawson, later ruled NC after an incorrect referee call
60	Win	52–5–2 (1)	Jean Pascal	UD	12	May 21, 2011	46 years, 126 days	Bell Centre, Montreal, Quebec, Canada	Won WBC, IBO and The Ring light heavyweight titles
59	Draw	51–5–2 (1)	Jean Pascal	MD	12	Dec 18, 2010	45 years, 337 days	Colisée Pepsi, Quebec City, Quebec, Canada	For WBC, IBO and The Ring light heavyweight titles
58	Win	51–5–1 (1)	Roy Jones Jr.	UD	12	Apr 3, 2010	45 years, 78 days	Mandalay Bay Events Center, Paradise, Nevada, U.S.	
57	Win	50–5–1 (1)	Enrique Ornelas	UD	12	Dec 2, 2009	44 years, 321 days	Liacouras Center, Philadelphia, Pennsylvania, U.S.	
56	Win	49–5–1 (1)	Kelly Pavlik	UD	12	Oct 18, 2008	43 years, 277 days	Boardwalk Hall, Atlantic City, New Jersey, U.S.	
55	Loss	48–5–1 (1)	Joe Calzaghe	SD	12	Apr 19, 2008	43 years, 95 days	Thomas & Mack Center, Paradise, Nevada, U.S.	Lost The Ring light heavyweight title
54	Win	48–4–1 (1)	Winky Wright	UD	12	Jul 21, 2007	42 years, 187 days	Mandalay Bay Events Center, Paradise, Nevada, U.S.	Retained The Ring light heavyweight title
53	Win	47–4–1 (1)	Antonio Tarver	UD	12	Jun 10, 2006	41 years, 146 days	Boardwalk Hall, Atlantic City, New Jersey, U.S.	Won IBO and The Ring light heavyweight titles
52	Loss	46–4–1 (1)	Jermain Taylor	UD	12	Dec 3, 2005	40 years, 322 days	Mandalay Bay Events Center, Paradise, Nevada, U.S.	For WBA (Undisputed), WBC, WBO, and The Ring middleweight titles
51	Loss	46–3–1 (1)	Jermain Taylor	SD	12	Jul 16, 2005	40 years, 182 days	MGM Grand Garden Arena, Paradise, Nevada, U.S.	Lost WBA (Undisputed), WBC, IBF, WBO, and The Ring middleweight titles
50	Win	46–2–1 (1)	Howard Eastman	UD	12	Feb 19, 2005	40 years, 35 days	Staples Center, Los Angeles, California, U.S.	Retained WBA (Undisputed), WBC, IBF, WBO, and The Ring middleweight titles
49	Win	45–2–1 (1)	Oscar De La Hoya	KO	9 (12), 1:38	Sep 18, 2004	39 years, 247 days	MGM Grand Garden Arena, Paradise, Nevada, U.S.	Retained WBA (Undisputed), WBC, IBF, and The Ring middleweight titles; Won WBO middleweight title
48	Win	44–2–1 (1)	Robert Allen	UD	12	Jun 5, 2004	39 years, 142 days	MGM Grand Garden Arena, Paradise, Nevada, U.S.	Retained WBA (Undisputed), WBC, IBF, and The Ring middleweight titles
47	Win	43–2–1 (1)	William Joppy	UD	12	Dec 13, 2003	38 years, 332 days	Boardwalk Hall, Atlantic City, New Jersey, U.S.	Retained WBA (Undisputed), WBC, IBF, and The Ring middleweight titles
46	Win	42–2–1 (1)	Morrade Hakkar	RTD	8 (12), 3:00	Mar 29, 2003	38 years, 73 days	Spectrum, Philadelphia, Pennsylvania, U.S.	Retained WBA (Unified), WBC, IBF, and The Ring middleweight titles
45	Win	41–2–1 (1)	Carl Daniels	RTD	10 (12), 3:00	Feb 2, 2002	37 years, 18 days	Sovereign Center, Reading, Pennsylvania, U.S.	Retained WBA (Super), WBC, IBF, and The Ring middleweight titles
44	Win	40–2–1 (1)	Félix Trinidad	TKO	12 (12), 1:18	Sep 29, 2001	36 years, 257 days	Madison Square Garden, New York City, New York, U.S.	Retained WBC and IBF middleweight titles; Won WBA (Super) middleweight title
43	Win	39–2–1 (1)	Keith Holmes	UD	12	Apr 14, 2001	36 years, 89 days	Madison Square Garden, New York City, New York, U.S.	Retained IBF middleweight title; Won WBC middleweight title
42	Win	38–2–1 (1)	Antwun Echols	TKO	10 (12), 1:42	Dec 1, 2000	35 years, 321 days	The Venetian Las Vegas, Paradise, Nevada, U.S.	Retained IBF middleweight title
41	Win	37–2–1 (1)	Syd Vanderpool	UD	12	May 13, 2000	35 years, 119 days	Conseco Fieldhouse, Indianapolis, Indiana, U.S.	Retained IBF middleweight title
40	Win	36–2–1 (1)	Antwun Echols	UD	12	Dec 12, 1999	34 years, 331 days	Miccosukee Resort & Gaming, Miami, Florida, U.S.	Retained IBF middleweight title
39	Win	35–2–1 (1)	Robert Allen	TKO	7 (12), 1:18	Feb 6, 1999	34 years, 22 days	Convention Center, Washington, D.C., U.S.	Retained IBF middleweight title
38	NC	34–2–1 (1)	Robert Allen	NC	4 (12), 2:57	Aug 28, 1998	33 years, 225 days	Las Vegas Hilton, Winchester, Nevada, U.S.	IBF middleweight title at stake; Hopkins unable to continue after the referee accidentally pushed him out of the ring
37	Win	34–2–1	Simon Brown	TKO	6 (12), 1:00	Jan 31, 1998	33 years, 16 days	Etess Arena, Atlantic City, New Jersey, U.S.	Retained IBF middleweight title
36	Win	33–2–1	Andrew Council	UD	12	Nov 18, 1997	32 years, 307 days	The Show Place Arena, Upper Marlboro, Maryland, U.S.	Retained IBF middleweight title
35	Win	32–2–1	Glen Johnson	TKO	11 (12), 1:23	Jul 20, 1997	32 years, 186 days	Fantasy Springs Resort Casino, Indio, California, U.S.	Retained IBF middleweight title
34	Win	31–2–1	John David Jackson	TKO	7 (12), 2:22	Apr 19, 1997	32 years, 94 days	Municipal Memorial Auditorium, Shreveport, Louisiana, U.S.	Retained IBF middleweight title
33	Win	30–2–1	William Bo James	TKO	11 (12), 2:02	Jul 16, 1996	31 years, 183 days	Resorts Casino Hotel, Atlantic City, New Jersey, U.S.	Retained IBF middleweight title
32	Win	29–2–1	Joe Lipsey	KO	4 (12), 2:50	Mar 16, 1996	31 years, 61 days	MGM Grand Garden Arena, Paradise, Nevada, U.S.	Retained IBF middleweight title
31	Win	28–2–1	Steve Frank	TKO	1 (12), 0:24	Jan 27, 1996	31 years, 12 days	Veterans Memorial Coliseum, Phoenix, Arizona, U.S.	Retained IBF middleweight title
30	Win	27–2–1	Segundo Mercado	TKO	7 (12), 1:10	Apr 29, 1995	30 years, 104 days	USAir Arena, Landover, Maryland, U.S.	Won vacant IBF middleweight title
29	Draw	26–2–1	Segundo Mercado	SD	12	Dec 17, 1994	29 years, 336 days	Coliseo General Rumiñahui, Quito, Ecuador	For vacant IBF middleweight title
28	Win	26–2	Lupe Aquino	UD	12	May 17, 1994	29 years, 122 days	Resorts Casino Hotel, Atlantic City, New Jersey, U.S.	Retained USBA middleweight title
27	Win	25–2	Melvin Wynn	TKO	3 (10), 0:48	Feb 26, 1994	29 years, 42 days	Sands, Atlantic City, New Jersey, U.S.	
26	Win	24–2	Wendall Hall	TKO	3 (12), 0:28	Nov 23, 1993	28 years, 312 days	The Blue Horizon, Philadelphia, Pennsylvania, U.S.	Retained USBA middleweight title
25	Win	23–2	Roy Ritchie	TKO	7 (12), 1:47	Aug 3, 1993	28 years, 200 days	Riviera, Winchester, Nevada, U.S.	Retained USBA middleweight title
24	Loss	22–2	Roy Jones Jr.	UD	12	May 22, 1993	28 years, 127 days	Robert F. Kennedy Memorial Stadium, Washington, D.C., U.S.	For vacant IBF middleweight title
23	Win	22–1	Gilbert Baptist	UD	12	Feb 16, 1993	28 years, 32 days	McNichols Sports Arena, Denver, Colorado, U.S.	Retained USBA middleweight title
22	Win	21–1	Wayne Powell	TKO	1 (12), 0:21	Dec 4, 1992	27 years, 324 days	Resorts Casino Hotel, Atlantic City, New Jersey, U.S.	Won vacant USBA middleweight title
21	Win	20–1	Eric Rhinehart	KO	1 (10), 1:47	Sep 14, 1992	27 years, 243 days	Eli's Pier 34, Philadelphia, Pennsylvania, U.S.	
20	Win	19–1	James Stokes	KO	1 (10), 1:44	Aug 28, 1992	27 years, 226 days	Trump Plaza Hotel and Casino, Atlantic City, New Jersey, U.S.	
19	Win	18–1	Aníbal Miranda	PTS	10	May 21, 1992	27 years, 127 days	Cirque d'hiver, Paris, France	
18	Win	17–1	Randy Smith	UD	10	Apr 3, 1992	27 years, 79 days	Trump Plaza Hotel and Casino, Atlantic City, New Jersey, U.S.	
17	Win	16–1	Dennis Milton	RTD	4 (10), 3:00	Jan 31, 1992	27 years, 16 days	The Blue Horizon, Philadelphia, Pennsylvania, U.S.	
16	Win	15–1	Willie Kemp	UD	10	Dec 13, 1991	26 years, 332 days	Convention Hall, Atlantic City, New Jersey, U.S.	
15	Win	14–1	David McCluskey	TKO	7 (10)	Nov 26, 1991	26 years, 315 days	The Blue Horizon, Philadelphia, Pennsylvania, U.S.	
14	Win	13–1	Ralph Moncrief	TKO	1 (10), 1:28	Sep 23, 1991	26 years, 251 days	The Blue Horizon, Philadelphia, Pennsylvania, U.S.	
13	Win	12–1	Danny Mitchell	TKO	1 (8), 3:00	Jul 9, 1991	26 years, 175 days	The Blue Horizon, Philadelphia, Pennsylvania, U.S.	
12	Win	11–1	Pedro Márquez	TKO	1 0:56	Jun 20, 1991	26 years, 157 days	Aspen Hotel, Parsippany, New Jersey, U.S.	
11	Win	10–1	Steve Langley	TKO	3 (6), 1:10	Mar 18, 1991	26 years, 62 days	The Mirage, Paradise, Nevada, U.S.	
10	Win	9–1	Richard Quiles	KO	1 (6)	Feb 26, 1991	26 years, 42 days	National Guard Armory, Philadelphia, Pennsylvania, U.S.	
9	Win	8–1	Mike Sapp	TKO	1 (8), 0:35	Nov 17, 1990	25 years, 306 days	Lee County Civic Center, Fort Myers, Florida, U.S.	
8	Win	7–1	Darren Oliver	TKO	1 (?)	Oct 20, 1990	25 years, 269 days	Trump Plaza Hotel and Casino, Atlantic City, New Jersey, U.S.	
7	Win	6–1	Percy Harris	UD	6	Aug 5, 1990	25 years, 202 days	Convention Hall, Atlantic City, New Jersey, U.S.	
6	Win	5–1	Khalif Shabazz	KO	1 (6), 0:36	Jun 30, 1990	25 years, 166 days	Trump's Castle, Atlantic City, New Jersey, U.S.	
5	Win	4–1	Jouvin Mercado	TKO	2 (4), 0:43	May 31, 1990	25 years, 136 days	War Memorial Auditorium, Rochester, New York, U.S.	
4	Win	3–1	Eddie Tyler	TKO	1 (6)	May 18, 1990	25 years, 123 days	Sands, Atlantic City, New Jersey, U.S.	
3	Win	2–1	Keith Gray	TKO	1 (?)	Apr 26, 1990	25 years, 101 days	The Blue Horizon, Philadelphia, Pennsylvania, U.S.	
2	Win	1–1	Greg Paige	UD	4	Feb 22, 1990	25 years, 38 days	The Blue Horizon, Philadelphia, Pennsylvania, U.S.	
1	Loss	0–1	Clinton Mitchell	MD	4	Oct 11, 1988	23 years, 270 days	Resorts Casino Hotel, Atlantic City, New Jersey, U.S.	

== Titles in boxing ==
=== Major world titles ===
- WBA (Unified, Undisputed, and Super) middleweight champion (Note: Was the Primary champion throughout his entire reign.) (160 lbs)
- WBC middleweight champion (160 lbs)
- IBF middleweight champion (160 lbs)
- WBO middleweight champion (160 lbs)
- WBA (Super) light heavyweight champion (175 lbs)
- WBC light heavyweight champion (175 lbs)
- IBF light heavyweight champion (175 lbs)

=== The Ring magazine titles ===
- The Ring middleweight champion (160 lbs)
- The Ring light heavyweight champion (175 lbs) (2×)

=== Minor world titles ===
- IBO light heavyweight champion (175 lbs)
- IBA light heavyweight champion (175 lbs)

=== Regional/International titles ===
- USBA middleweight champion (160 lbs)

=== Undisputed titles ===
- Undisputed middleweight champion

=== Honorary titles ===
- WBC Emeritus Champion
- WBC Diamond light heavyweight champion
- WBO Super Champion

== Pay-per-view bouts ==
Date	Fight	Billing	Buys	Revenue
September 29, 2001	Trinidad vs. Hopkins	And Then There Was One	475,000	$20.4m
September 18, 2004	De La Hoya vs. Hopkins	It's History	1,000,000	$56m
July 16, 2005	Hopkins vs. Taylor	Next In Line	370,000	$17.5m
December 3, 2005	Taylor vs. Hopkins II	No Respect	410,000	$20.5m
June 10, 2006	Tarver vs. Hopkins	Fight To The Finish	330,000	$16.5m
July 21, 2007	Hopkins vs. Wright	Coming To Fight	330,000	$16.5m
April 3, 2010	Hopkins vs. Jones II	The Rivals	150,000	$7.5m
Total	7 Pay Per View Fights		3,065,000	$154.9m

== See also ==
- List of undisputed boxing champions
- List of middleweight boxing champions
- List of light heavyweight boxing champions
- List of WBA world champions
- List of WBC world champions
- List of IBF world champions
- List of WBO world champions
- List of IBO world champions
- List of The Ring world champions

== Notes ==
Sporting positions
Regional boxing titles
Vacant Title last held by Reggie Johnson	USBA middleweight champion December 4, 1992 – December 1994; Vacated	Vacant Title next held by Robert Allen
Minor world boxing titles
Preceded by Antonio Tarver	IBO light heavyweight champion June 10, 2006 – June 2007; Vacated	Vacant Title next held by Antonio Tarver
Major world boxing titles
Vacant Title last held by Roy Jones Jr.	IBF middleweight champion April 29, 1995 – July 16, 2005	Succeeded by Jermain Taylor
Preceded by Keith Holmes	WBC middleweight champion April 14, 2001 – July 16, 2005	Succeeded by Jermain Taylor
New title Unified against Félix Trinidad	WBA middleweight champion Undisputed title September 29, 2001 – July 16, 2005; Super title until August 5, 2002; Unified title until September 26, 2003	Succeeded by Jermain Taylor
Vacant Title last held by Marvin Hagler	Undisputed middleweight champion September 29, 2001 – July 16, 2005	Succeeded by Jermain Taylor
Vacant Title last held by Michael Nunn	The Ring middleweight champion December 2, 2001 – July 16, 2005	Succeeded by Jermain Taylor
Preceded by Oscar De La Hoya	WBO middleweight champion September 18, 2004 – July 16, 2005	Succeeded by Jermain Taylor
Preceded by Antonio Tarver	The Ring light heavyweight champion June 10, 2006 – April 19, 2008	Succeeded by Joe Calzaghe
Preceded by Jean Pascal	WBC light heavyweight champion May 12, 2011 – April 29, 2012	Succeeded by Chad Dawson
Preceded by Jean Pascal	The Ring light heavyweight champion May 21, 2011 – April 29, 2012	Succeeded by Chad Dawson
Preceded by Tavoris Cloud	IBF light heavyweight champion March 9, 2013 – November 8, 2014	Succeeded by Sergey Kovalev
Preceded by Beibut Shumenov	WBA light heavyweight champion Super title April 19, 2014 – November 8, 2014; Failed to win Undisputed title	Vacant Title next held by Dmitry Bivol
Awards
Previous: Félix Trinidad	The Ring Fighter of the Year; 2001	Next: Vernon Forrest
Previous: Félix Trinidad	BWAA Fighter of the Year; 2001	Next: Vernon Forrest
Previous: Nonito Donaire; KO5 Vic Darchinyan	The Ring Upset of the Year; UD12 Kelly Pavlik; 2008	Next: Juan Carlos Salgado; KO1 Jorge Linares
Previous: Floyd Mayweather Jr.	The Ring Comeback of the Year; 2010	Next: Érik Morales
Achievements
Preceded by Shane Mosley	The Ring pound for pound #1 boxer January 27, 2002 – March 11, 2003	Succeeded by Roy Jones Jr.
Preceded by Roy Jones Jr.	The Ring pound for pound #1 boxer June 8, 2004 – July 18, 2005	Succeeded by Floyd Mayweather Jr.
Records
Preceded by Carlos Monzón; 14	Most successful world middleweight title defenses 19; February 19, 2005 – May 5, 2018; 15th defense on February 2, 2002	Succeeded by Gennady Golovkin; 20
Preceded by Felix Sturm; 12	Most opponents beaten for a world middleweight title 17; April 14, 2001 – present 13th opponent beaten on April 14, 2001	Incumbent
Preceded by George Foreman; Age 45	Oldest boxer to win a major world title Age 49; April 19, 2014 – present Broke the record at age 46; broke his own record again at ages 48 and 49	Incumbent
Preceded by George Foreman; Age 45	Oldest boxer to hold or unify multiple major world titles Age 49; April 19, 2014 – present	Incumbent
