= Bernard Hopkins vs. Jermain Taylor =

Boxing competition

Next in Line
- Date: July 16, 2005
- Venue: MGM Grand Garden Arena, Paradise, Nevada
- Title(s) on the line: WBA, WBC, IBF, WBO and The Ring undisputed middleweight championship

Tale of the tape
| Boxer | (United States) Bernard Hopkins | (United States) Jermain Taylor |
| Nickname | "The Executioner" | "Bad Intentions" |
| Hometown | Philadelphia, Pennsylvania | Little Rock, Arkansas |
| Purse | $4,000,000 | $1,400,000 |
| Pre-fight record | 46–2–1 (1) (32 KO) | 23–0 (17 KO) |
| Age | 40 years, 6 months | 26 years, 11 months |
| Height | 6 ft 1 in (185 cm) | 6 ft 1 in (185 cm) |
| Weight | 160 lb (73 kg) | 160 lb (73 kg) |
| Style | Orthodox | Orthodox |
| Recognition | WBA, WBC, IBF, WBO and The Ring; Undisputed Middleweight Champion; The Ring No. 1 ranked pound-for-pound fighter | WBC/IBF; No. 3 Ranked Middleweight; WBA; No. 4 Ranked Middleweight; WBO/The Ring; No. 5 Ranked Middleweight |

Result
- Taylor wins via 12-round split decision (112–116, 115–113, 115–113)

Bernard Hopkins vs. Jermain Taylor, billed as Next in Line, was a professional boxing match contested on July 16, 2005 for the WBA (Undisputed), WBC, IBF, WBO, and The Ring middleweight championships.

== Background ==
Hopkins entered the bout as a 3–2 favourite.

== The fight ==
Taylor was able to successfully use his jab to control the action first two rounds of the fight, though neither fighter was taking any major risks. He tended to move forward, while Hopkins was patient and waited for openings in Taylor's defence. In round five, a clash of heads opened a cut on the top of Taylor's head. In the tenth round, Hopkins hurt Taylor with two right hands that made his legs wobble and forced him to clinch.

Taylor won the bout by split decision with two judges scoring the fight 115–113 for Taylor and the other judge scoring it 116–112 for Hopkins. With the victory, Taylor became the new Undisputed Middleweight Champion, winning the WBC, WBA (Super), IBF, WBO, The Ring and Lineal Middleweight Championships.

HBO's Harold Lederman had the bout scored 115-113 for Taylor. Many press row writers scored the fight for Hopkins.

== Aftermath ==
Hopkins appealed the decision, but was denied by the Nevada State Athletic Commission.

== Undercard ==
Confirmed bouts:

== Broadcasting ==
| Country | Broadcaster |
|---|---|
| Australia | Main Event |
| United States | HBO |

| Preceded by vs. Howard Eastman | Bernard Hopkins's bouts July 16, 2005 | Succeeded by Rematch |
| Preceded by vs. Daniel Edouard | Jermain Taylor's bouts July 16, 2005 | Succeeded by Rematch |
