= Joe Smith Jr. =

American boxer (born 1989)

Personal information
- Nicknames: The Irish Bomber; Beast from the East; The Common Man
- Born: September 20, 1989 (age 37) Long Island, New York, U.S.
- Height: 6 ft 0 in (183 cm)
- Weight: Light heavyweight

Boxing career
- Reach: 76 in (193 cm)
- Stance: Orthodox

Boxing record
- Total fights: 33
- Wins: 28
- Win by KO: 22
- Losses: 5

Joe Smith Jr. (born September 20, 1989) is an American professional boxer. He held the World Boxing Organization (WBO) light heavyweight title from 2021 to 2022. In 2016, Smith became the first boxer to score a stoppage victory over former undisputed middleweight world champion Bernard Hopkins.

== Professional career ==
=== Early career ===
Smith made his professional debut in October 2009 defeating David Brown by technical knockout in the first round in Connecticut.

Smith won his next five fights only to lose his 7th professional fight against Eddie Caminero.

Over the next five years, Smith racked up a record of 20 wins with 16 coming inside the distance and 1 loss. This included wins against the likes of Otis Griffin, Cory Cummings and a decision win against Will Rosinsky.

=== Career from 2016–2017 ===
In April 2016, Smith defeated Brazilian boxer Fabiano Pena (16–4–1, 12 KOs) via a 2nd-round TKO winning 15 straight fights and continuing to rise up the ranks.

==== Smith vs. Fonfara ====
It was announced that Smith would be fighting the #2 WBC contender, former world title challenger Andrzej Fonfara (28–3, 16 KOs) for the WBC international light heavyweight title at the UIC Pavilion in Chicago, Illinois on June 18, 2016, in a scheduled 10 round fight in the main event of the Premier Boxing Champions card on NBC. Fonfara was coming off a huge decision win over British boxer Nathan Cleverly. A win here for Fonfara would set him up for another world title shot.

In an 'Upset of the Year' in the light heavyweight division, Smith won the title by defeating Fonfara via a 1st-round technical knockout. Smith knocked Fonfara down twice in the round 1. The fight was halted after the second knockdown by referee Hector Afu. The official time of the stoppage was at 2:32. Smith caught Fonfara with a big right hand that dropped him. Fonfara got back to his feet. The referee let the fight continue. When the action resumed, Smith landed a left hook that snapped Fonfara's head back. Smith then followed up with a hard right hand to the head that dropped Fonfara in the corner, which ended the fight. The win also ended Fonfara's 15 fight undefeated streak at the UIC Pavilion. The fight took place on Premier Boxing Champions on NBC. The whole card averaged 1.32 million viewers.

==== Smith vs. Hopkins ====
Former multiple weight world champion Bernard Hopkins (55–7–2, 32 KOs) announced he would be having a farewell fight at The Forum in Inglewood, California on December 17, 2016. He picked Smith as his final opponent. Hopkins would be coming out of a two-year layoff having last fought in 2014 in a decision loss to then unified light heavyweight champion Sergey Kovalev. Smith was said to be 'excited' to be fighting on HBO, in a card promoted by Golden Boy. Both boxers weighed in at 174 pounds.

On fight night, in front of a 6,513 crowd, Smith upset and defeated Hopkins via KO when he knocked him out of the ring in the 8th round; Hopkins failed to make it back into the ring as referee Jack Reiss gave his 20-count. He became the first boxer to stop Hopkins inside the distance. Smith started much stronger than expected and his speed and power seemed to surprise Hopkins. In the 8th round, Smith caught Hopkins in the corner and landed five shots to the head that knocked him out of the ring. Hopkins said he was hurt and couldn't get back into the ring. He insisted that he'd been pushed out of the ring, but replays showed it wasn't a push. Hopkins spoke to HBO in the post fight interview, "He shoved me out of the ring. My ankle got twisted when I fell out of the ring. I couldn't stand on my feet ... I can't believe they gave him a TKO. They can call it a no-contest but not a loss. The momentum from his body pushed me. I went out like a soldier. I'm not in denial." Smith retained his WBC International light heavyweight title with the win and spoke of his respect for Hopkins in the post-fight, stating he is 'a true champion'. Hopkins' reported purse was $800,000, compared to Smith's $140,000. According to Ringtv, the fight averaged 934,000 viewers, peaking at 1.035m on HBO.

==== Smith vs. Barrera ====
In March 2017, the WBC ordered a final eliminator between Smith and Oleksandr Gvozdyk, ranked third and fourth respectively by the WBC. The winner of the fight would then become the secondary mandatory challenger for the world title. On May 12, Boxing Scene confirmed a deal was in place for Smith to fight Cuban light heavyweight contender Sullivan Barrera (19–1, 14 KOs). Early reports indicated the fight would be part of a HBO triple-header also featuring Miguel Berchelt defending his WBC super featherweight title against mandated Takashi Miura on July 15, 2017, in Inglewood, California. The fight was officially confirmed on May 18 and shown live on HBO: Boxing After Dark. Smith knocked Barrera down in round one with a left hook to the head, but was dominated for the rest of the fight and went on to lose via unanimous decision after 10 rounds. The three judges scored the fight 97–92, 97–92 and 96–93 all in favor of Barrera. Smith was beaten to the punch in almost every round, only landing 61 of his 320 punches thrown (19%), whilst Barrera was more accurate in landing 187 of 484 thrown (39%). In round 4, Smith was hit with a clean uppercut and by the end of round 7, his team urged him to go for a knockout. Referee Jack Reiss had the ringside doctor take a look at Smith after the seventh, but the fight continued. Ringtv scored the fight wider 98–91, only giving Smith two rounds. It was revealed after the fight there was confusion in Barrera's corner as well as the HBO commentary team in regards to the fight being 10 rounds instead of 12. The referee told both boxers to touch gloves at the start of the 10th round. At first the HBO commentary thought the referee had made a mistake, but were later told, both fighters agreed to the fight being 10 rounds. The fight averaged 617,000 viewers on HBO and peaked at 719,000 viewers.

According to ESPN, Smith may have sustained a suspected head injury and taken to hospital after the fight. Smith accepted defeat to the better man, "Sullivan Barrera fought a good fight, and I congratulate him." Smith earned a career high purse of $160,000 compared to Barrera, who earned $130,000 for his win. A few days later, Smith released a statement on social media that he had broken his jaw and believed to have broken it in round two, "Somewhere during the second round I was injured and was in a lot of pain, but I did not want to let it show and I refused to quit." As the fight went on, he admitted the pain got worse and the fight got tougher. On July 20, Smith had surgery to repair his broken jaw. The surgery took place at the Stony Brook University Hospital in Stony Brook, New York.

=== Career from 2018 ===
In January 2018, according to his promoter Joe DeGuardia, Smith was looking to make a ring return around May 2018. DeGuardia stated that he wanted to create an event around Smith, however did not mention whether Smith would fight a top contender. On May 9, it was announced that Smith would make his return to the ring at the Mohegan Sun Arena in Montville, Connecticut on June 30, 2018. On May 31, it was confirmed that 39 year old Melvin Russell (11–4–2, 7 KO's) would be Smith's opponent in a 10-round bout. Smith dropped Russell twice in round 1 before the referee stopped the bout after just 1 minute 45 seconds. After the bout, Smith called for a bout with then-WBO champion Sergey Kovalev.

==== Smith vs. Bivol, Hart and Álvarez ====
In September 2018, it was reported a deal was being worked out for Smith to challenge Russian boxer Dmitry Bivol for his WBA light heavyweight title. On October 15, Yvon Michel told the LA Presse that Smith was in talks to challenge his fighter, the IBF champion Artur Beterbiev (13–0, 13 KOs), on a card that would take place on DAZN. Smith's manager, Joe DeGuardia of Star Boxing also confirmed the Beterbiev fight was the one they would pursue. According to Le Journal de Montréal on November 3, Beterbiev decided against defending his title on December 15 against Smith and instead stated he would fight him in early 2019 instead.

On March 9, 2019, Smith Jr challenged WBA champion Dmitry Bivol for his light heavyweight version of the belt. Smith Jr managed to stun Bivol at the end of the tenth round, and Bivol needed the ropes to balance his way to the corner. Bivol, however, dominated most of the fight and came very close to stopping Smith Jr just before the final bell. The scorecards read 119–109, 119–109 and 118–110 in favor of the champion.

In his next fight, Smith Jr battled Jesse Hart. Smith Jr roughed up Hart, and knocked him down en route to a split-decision victory. Two judges had it 98–91 and 97–92 for Smith Jr, while the third judge had Hart winning the fight, 95–94, the last scorecard deemed controversial by both media and fans alike.

On August 22, 2020, Smith Jr, ranked #4 by the WBO, #7 by the IBF, #8 by the WBC and #8 by The Ring at light heavyweight, fought Eleider Alvarez, ranked #3 by the WBO, #6 by the WBC and #4 by The Ring. In what was a WBO title shot eliminator, Smith Jr, usually regarded as more of a brawler, showcased his boxing skills en route to a ninth-round KO win. Smith Jr caught Alvarez with two right hands, which sent the Colombian under the ropes and ended the fight.

==== Smith vs. Vlasov ====
On April 10, 2020, Smith Jr. challenged Maxim Vlasov for the vacant WBO World Light Heavyweight Title. Smith Jr. was able to capture the title via a controversial majority decision. Two judges had it 115–113 and 115–112 for Smith Jr, while the third judge had it tied at 114-114.

==== Smith vs. Geffrard ====
Smith was expected to make his first WBO title defense against the #5 ranked WBO light heavyweight contender Callum Johnson on January 15, 2022, at the Turning Stone Resort Casino in Verona, New York. On January 6, 2022, it was revealed that Johnson was forced to withdraw from the bout due to a positive COVID-19 test. He was replaced by Steve Geffrard, who stepped in on a weeks notice. The bout was broadcast by ESPN and Sky Sports. Smith stopped Geffrard in the 9th round.

==== Smith vs. Beterbiev ====
On May 4, 2022, it was announced that Smith would be defending his WBO title for a second time on June 18, 2022, in a unification bout against undefeated WBC and IBF light heavyweight champion Artur Beterbiev at the Hulu Theater in New York City, New York. The fight was broadcast on ESPN+. Smith was knocked down three times in the first two rounds as he was defeated via second-round technical knockout, losing his WBO title.

== Professional boxing record ==
33 fights	28 wins	5 losses
By knockout	22	2
By decision	6	3

No.	Result	Record	Opponent	Type	Round, time	Date	Location	Notes
33	Loss	28–5	Gilberto Ramírez	UD	10	Oct 7, 2023	Chelsea Ballroom, Paradise, Nevada, U.S.	
32	Loss	28–4	Artur Beterbiev	TKO	2 (12), 2:19	Jun 18, 2022	Hulu Theater, New York City, New York, U.S.	Lost WBO light heavyweight title; For WBC and IBF light heavyweight titles
31	Win	28–3	Steve Geffrard	TKO	9 (12), 2:17	Jan 15, 2022	Turning Stone Resort Casino, Verona, New York, U.S.	Retained WBO light heavyweight title
30	Win	27–3	Maxim Vlasov	MD	12	Apr 10, 2021	Osage Casino, Tulsa, Oklahoma, U.S.	Won vacant WBO light heavyweight title
29	Win	26–3	Eleider Álvarez	KO	9 (12), 0:26	Aug 22, 2020	MGM Grand Conference Center, Paradise, Nevada, U.S.	
28	Win	25–3	Jesse Hart	SD	10	Jan 11, 2020	Hard Rock Hotel & Casino, Atlantic City, New Jersey, U.S.	Won NABO light heavyweight title
27	Loss	24–3	Dmitry Bivol	UD	12	Mar 9, 2019	Turning Stone Resort Casino, Verona, New York, U.S.	For WBA light heavyweight title
26	Win	24–2	Melvin Russell	KO	1 (10), 1:45	Jun 30, 2018	Mohegan Sun Arena, Montville, Connecticut, U.S.	
25	Loss	23–2	Sullivan Barrera	UD	10	Jul 15, 2017	The Forum, Inglewood, California, U.S.	Lost WBC International light heavyweight title
24	Win	23–1	Bernard Hopkins	TKO	8 (12), 0:53	Dec 17, 2016	The Forum, Inglewood, California, U.S.	Retained WBC International light heavyweight title
23	Win	22–1	Andrzej Fonfara	TKO	1 (10), 2:32	Jun 18, 2016	UIC Pavilion, Chicago, Illinois, U.S.	Won WBC International light heavyweight title
22	Win	21–1	Fabiano Pena	TKO	2 (10), 2:38	Apr 23, 2016	The Paramount, Huntington, New York, U.S.	
21	Win	20–1	Will Rosinsky	UD	10	Dec 5, 2015	Barclays Center, New York City, New York, U.S.	
20	Win	19–1	Shujaa El Amin	TKO	9 (10), 2:25	Sep 11, 2015	The Paramount, Huntington, New York, U.S.	
19	Win	18–1	Cory Cummings	TKO	2 (10), 2:10	Apr 18, 2015	The Paramount, Huntington, New York, U.S.	
18	Win	17–1	Maxell Taylor	TKO	1 (8), 0:37	Dec 20, 2014	The Paramount, Huntington, New York, U.S.	
17	Win	16–1	Tyrell Hendrix	TKO	3 (8), 1:45	Jul 23, 2014	B.B. King Blues Club & Grill, New York City, New York, U.S.	
16	Win	15–1	Michael Gbenga	RTD	2 (8), 3:00	Mar 21, 2014	Aviator Sports and Events Center, New York City, New York, U.S.	
15	Win	14–1	Otis Griffin	UD	6	Feb 12, 2014	Roseland Ballroom, New York City, New York, U.S.	
14	Win	13–1	Lamont Williams	SD	6	Nov 9, 2013	Aviator Sports and Events Center, New York City, New York, U.S.	
13	Win	12–1	Hamid Abdul-Mateen	UD	6	May 4, 2013	Resorts World, New York City, New York, U.S.	
12	Win	11–1	Yasin Rashid	TKO	3 (8), 1:57	Sep 22, 2012	Resorts World, New York City, New York, U.S.	
11	Win	10–1	James Denson	TKO	1 (6), 1:54	May 17, 2012	Plattduetsche Park Restaurant, Hempstead, New York, U.S.	
10	Win	9–1	Amador Acevedo	KO	5 (6), 2:55	Apr 21, 2012	Cordon Bleu, New York City, New York, U.S.	
9	Win	8–1	Dennis Ogboo	TKO	2 (4), 2:06	Mar 30, 2012	Foxwoods Resort Casino, Ledyard, Connecticut, U.S.	
8	Win	7–1	Santos Martinez	KO	2 (4), 2:40	Jul 30, 2011	Aviator Sports and Events Center, New York City, New York, U.S.	
7	Loss	6–1	Eddie Caminero	TKO	4 (6), 2:58	Aug 7, 2010	Aviator Sports and Events Center, New York City, New York, U.S.	
6	Win	6–0	Charles Wade	TKO	2 (4), 1:10	Jul 28, 2010	B.B. King Blues Club & Grill, New York City, New York, U.S.	
5	Win	5–0	Walter Foster	TKO	2 (4), 1:39	Jun 26, 2010	Mohegan Sun Arena, Montville, Connecticut, U.S.	
4	Win	4–0	Christopher Dammones	TKO	1 (4), 0:18	Apr 2, 2010	Brooklyn Masonic Temple, New York City, New York, U.S.	
3	Win	3–0	Carlos Adams	TKO	1 (4), 0:42	Mar 12, 2010	Foxwoods Resort Casino, Ledyard, Connecticut, U.S.	
2	Win	2–0	Brandon McGowan	KO	1 (4), 0:45	Nov 20, 2009	Twin River Event Center, Lincoln, Rhode Island, U.S.	
1	Win	1–0	David Brown	TKO	1 (4), 2:35	Oct 31, 2009	Mohegan Sun Arena, Montville, Connecticut, U.S.	

Sporting positions
Regional boxing titles
Preceded by Andrzej Fonfara	WBC International light heavyweight champion June 18, 2016 – July 15, 2017	Succeeded by Sullivan Barrera
Vacant Title last held by Alfonso López	NABO light heavyweight champion January 11, 2020 – April 10, 2021; Won world title	Vacant
World boxing titles
Vacant Title last held by Canelo Álvarez	WBO light heavyweight champion April 10, 2021 – June 18, 2022	Succeeded by Artur Beterbiev
