= Beibut Shumenov =

Kazakh boxer (born 1983)

Beibut Shumenov Бейбут Шуменов
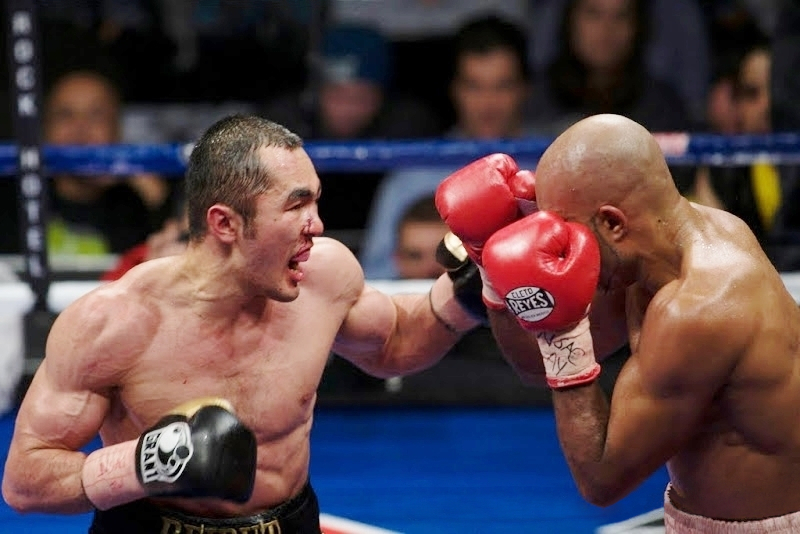
- Shumenov (left) vs. Campillo, 2010

Personal information
- Nationality: Kazakh
- Born: Beibut Amirhanovich Shumenov; 19 August 1983 (age 43) Shymkent, Kazakh SSR, Soviet Union
- Height: 1.88 m (6 ft 2 in)
- Weight: Light-heavyweight; Cruiserweight

Boxing career
- Reach: 188 cm (74 in)
- Stance: Orthodox

Boxing record
- Total fights: 20
- Wins: 18
- Win by KO: 12
- Losses: 2
Medal record
Men's amateur boxing
Representing Kazakhstan
Asian Championships
Gold medal – first place	2004 Puerto Princesa	Light-heavyweight

Beibut Amirhanuly Shumenov (Kazakh: Бейбіт Әмірханұлы Шүменов; born 19 August 1983) is a Kazakh former professional boxer. He is a former world champion, who held the WBA light-heavyweight title from 2010 to 2014. He also held the WBA (Regular) cruiserweight title twice between 2016 and 2021

== Early life ==
Shumenov’s mother was a schoolteacher and his father a chief accountant. Both worked long hours and Shumenov was left with two aunts to look after him. Shumenov nearly died as a baby, after severe complications from consuming spoiled milk while in the care of his aunts. Even though he eventually recovered, the lingering effects of his health scare stuck with him throughout childhood.

Shumenov developed a love for combat sports while watching Bruce Lee films and began practicing numerous martial arts disciplines as he matured.

As a young man Shumenov earned a law degree and clerked for a judge at the same time he was honing his skills as a fighter.

== Amateur career ==
Shumenov represented Kazakhstan in the 2004 Summer Olympics. His results were:

- Defeated Aleksy Kuziemski (Poland) 34-22
- Lost to Ihsan Yildirim Tarhan (Turkey) 19-27

He had qualified for the 2004 Athens Games by winning the gold medal at the 2004 Asian Amateur Boxing Championships in Puerto Princesa, Philippines. In the final he defeated PR of China's Lei Yuping.

== Professional career ==
Shumenov moved to the United States and based himself in Las Vegas where he turned professional in March 2007. In his debut in North Carolina, he defeated Walter Edwards with a knockout (KO) in the first round. He followed this up with another two KO wins within four months.

In March 2008, he returned to Kazakhstan to fight Donnell Wiggins for the vacant WBC Asian and WBA-PABA interim light-heavyweight titles. Shumenov quickly dispatched the experienced Wiggins with a second-round KO and the next month beat former US national Golden Gloves champion Lavell Finger in the first round to add the vacant WBO Asia Pacific title to his WBA-PABA interim and WBC Asian titles.

His most high-profile fight came in August 2008 when he faced former world champion Montell Griffin in Chimkent, Kazakhstan to defend his regional WBC and WBO titles. Shumenov was taken to the scorecards for the first time in his career but won the fight clearly, winning every round on all three judges cards.

He was targeting a fight with then WBO light-heavyweight champion Zsolt Erdei.

=== WBA light-heavyweight champion ===
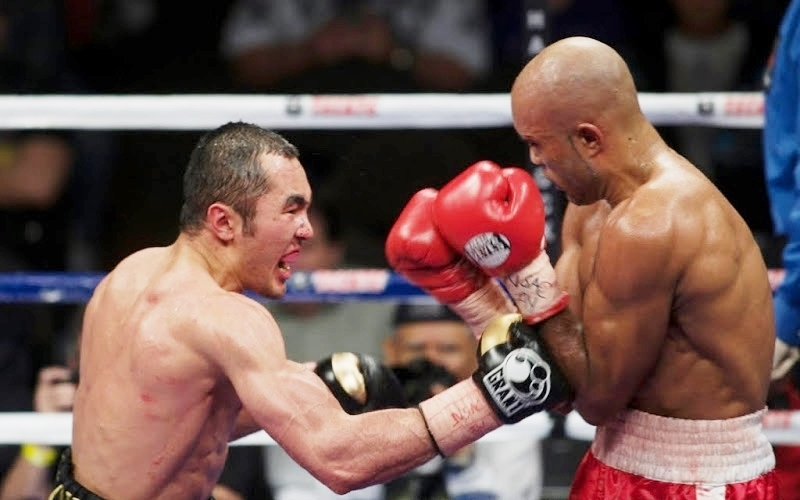
Shumenov vs. Campillo, 2010

On 15 August 2009 and with only eight professional bouts on his record, he received a shot at the WBA light-heavyweight title when he took on the Gabriel Campillo. The fight took place in Shumenov's home country of Kazakhstan and resulted in the first loss of his career when Campillo was declared the winner by majority decision (MD). A rematch took place on 9 January 2010, with the result being reversed with Shumenov being declared the winner by what was considered an extremely controversial split decision (SD). With this victory he became the quickest man ever to win a world title in the light-heavyweight division, beating the record of fifteen fights set by Jeff Harding in 1989.

Shumenov made the first defense of his title on 23 July 2010 when he won a unanimous decision (UD) against the previously unbeaten Viacheslav Uzelkov. Shumenov then arranged to have a unification fight with the then WBO champion Jürgen Brähmer, with the fight scheduled to take place in Kazakhstan on 8 January 2011. However, days before the fight was due to take place, Brähmer left Kazakhstan and returned to Germany, citing illness as his reason for dropping out of the fight. In his place, former middleweight world champion William Joppy stepped in at short notice, and was knocked out by Shumenov in the sixth round.

He successfully defended his title in Las Vegas on 29 July 2011 against former Contender star Danny Santiago and again on 2 June 2012 in Las Vegas against Enrique Ornelas.

Shumenov was promoted to WBA (Super) champion and retained the WBA (Super) and IBA light-heavyweight titles against Tomáš Kovács on 14 December 2013.

==== Shumenov vs. Hopkins ====
Shumenov fought Bernard Hopkins in a unification bout on 19 April 2014, losing his WBA (Super) and IBA light-heavyweight titles. Shumenov lost the fight via split-decision, with the judges scoring the fight 116-111 and 116-111 for Hopkins, while the third had it 113-114 for Shumenov.

=== WBA cruiserweight champion and retirement ===
==== Shumenov vs. Flores ====
Shumenov defeated BJ Flores by a UD for WBA interim cruiserweight title at the Palms Casino Resort in Las Vegas on 25 July 2015 in a Premier Boxing Champions bout broadcast live on NBCSN. Flores pressed the action throughout the fight, serving as the aggressor for much of the night. Shumenov began ramping up his offense in round eight, throwing combinations and taking advantage of a tiring Flores. With ten seconds left to go in the fight, Flores landed a punishing right hand that sent Shumenov careening into the ropes. Flores didn’t have enough time to take advantage of the opportunity and inflict more damage on a suddenly vulnerable Shumenov, resulting in a UD victory for Shumenov.

==== Shumenov vs. Wright ====
On 21 May 2016, Shumenov fought Junior Anthony Wright for the vacant WBA cruiserweight title. Shumenov won the fight via a tenth-round TKO.

In June 2017, Shumenov retired at the age of 33 because of an eye injury. This retirement would be short-lived, as he returned in July 2018 to win back the vacant WBA (Regular) cruiserweight title.

==== Shumenov vs. Altunkaya ====
Shumenov won back the WBA against Hizni Altunkaya, who was ranked #3 at cruiserweight by the WBA. Shumenov won the fight convincingly, winning 90-79 on all three scorecards.

== Professional boxing record ==
20 fights	18 wins	2 losses
By knockout	12	0
By decision	6	2

No.	Result	Record	Opponent	Type	Round, time	Date	Location	Notes
20	Win	18–2	Hizni Altunkaya	RTD	9 (12), 3:00	7 Jul 2018	Barys Arena, Astana, Kazakhstan	Won vacant WBA (Regular) cruiserweight title
19	Win	17–2	Junior Anthony Wright	TKO	10 (12), 1:04	21 May 2016	Cosmopolitan of Las Vegas, Paradise, Nevada, US	Won vacant WBA (Regular) cruiserweight title
18	Win	16–2	BJ Flores	UD	12	25 Jul 2015	Pearl Concert Theater, Paradise, Nevada, US	Won WBA interim cruiserweight title
17	Win	15–2	Bobby Thomas Jr.	RTD	5 (8), 3:00	13 Dec 2014	MGM Grand Garden Arena, Paradise, Nevada, US	
16	Loss	14–2	Bernard Hopkins	SD	12	19 Apr 2014	DC Armory, Washington, DC, US	Lost WBA (Super) and IBA light-heavyweight titles; For IBF light-heavyweight title
15	Win	14–1	Tomáš Kovács	TKO	3 (12), 2:55	14 Dec 2013	Alamodome, San Antonio, Texas, US	Retained WBA (Super) and IBA light-heavyweight titles
14	Win	13–1	Enrique Ornelas	UD	12	2 Jun 2012	The Joint, Paradise, Nevada, US	Retained WBA and IBA light-heavyweight titles
13	Win	12–1	Danny Santiago	TKO	9 (12), 0:46	29 Jul 2011	South Point Hotel Casino and Spa, Las Vegas, Nevada, US	Retained WBA and IBA light-heavyweight titles
12	Win	11–1	William Joppy	KO	6 (12), 0:15	8 Jan 2011	Sport Palace, Shymkent, Kazakhstan	Retained WBA and IBA light-heavyweight titles
11	Win	10–1	Vyacheslav Uzelkov	UD	12	23 Jul 2010	Tachi Palace Hotel & Casino, Lemoore, California, US	Retained WBA and IBA light-heavyweight titles
10	Win	9–1	Gabriel Campillo	SD	12	29 Jan 2010	The Joint, Paradise, Nevada, US	Retained IBA light-heavyweight title; Won WBA light-heavyweight title
9	Loss	8–1	Gabriel Campillo	MD	12	15 Aug 2009	Daulet National Tennis Centre, Astana, Kazakhstan	For WBA light-heavyweight title
8	Win	8–0	Byron Mitchell	TKO	4 (12), 2:58	9 May 2009	Stadium Khadjimukan, Shymkent, Kazakhstan	Retained WBC–ABCO, WBO Asia Pacific, and PABA interim light-heavyweight titles; Won vacant IBA light-heavyweight title
7	Win	7–0	Epifanio Mendoza	UD	10	13 Dec 2008	Meydenbauer Center, Bellevue, Washington, US	
6	Win	6–0	Montell Griffin	UD	12	2 Aug 2008	Stadium Khadjimukan, Shymkent, Kazakhstan	Retained WBC–ABCO and WBO Asia Pacific light-heavyweight titles
5	Win	5–0	Lavell Finger	KO	1 (12), 1:05	22 Apr 2008	Arman, Shymkent, Kazakhstan	Retained WBC–ABCO and PABA interim light heavyweight titles; Won vacant WBO Asia Pacific light-heavyweight title
4	Win	4–0	Donnell Wiggins	KO	2 (12), 2:11	10 Apr 2008	Arman, Shymkent, Kazakhstan	Won vacant WBC–ABCO and PABA interim light-heavyweight titles
3	Win	3–0	Shannon Miller	TKO	4 (6), 1:43	21 Mar 2008	The New Daisy Theatre, Memphis, Tennessee, US	
2	Win	2–0	Cedric Howard	KO	1 (4), 2:23	22 Feb 2008	Xtreme Indoor Karting, Fort Lauderdale, Florida, US	
1	Win	1–0	Walter Edwards	TKO	1 (4), 2:58	17 Nov 2007	Gymnasium, Wilson, North Carolina, US	

Sporting positions
Regional boxing titles
New title	WBC–ABCO light-heavyweight champion 10 April 2008 – August 2009; Vacated	Vacant Title next held by Gayrat Ahmedov
Vacant Title last held by Danny Green	PABA light-heavyweight champion Interim title 10 April 2008 – August 2009; Vacated	Vacant Title next held by Gayrat Ahmedov
Vacant Title last held by Alexey Trofimov	WBO Asia Pacific light-heavyweight champion 22 April 2008 – August 2009; Vacated	Vacant Title next held by Soulan Pownceby
Interim world boxing titles
Vacant Title last held by Youri Kalenga	WBA cruiserweight champion Interim title 25 July 2015 – 21 May 2016; Won regular title	Succeeded by Yuniel Dorticos as co-interim champion
Minor world boxing titles
Vacant Title last held by Reggie Johnson	IBA light-heavyweight champion 9 May 2009 – 19 April 2014; Vacant after loss to Hopkins	Vacant Title next held by Sergey Kovalev
Major world boxing titles
Preceded by Gabriel Campillo	WBA light-heavyweight champion 29 January 2010 – 8 October 2013; Promoted	Succeeded by Himself as Super champion
Vacant Title last held by Antonio Tarver	WBA light-heavyweight champion Super title 8 October 2013 – 19 April 2014	Succeeded by Bernard Hopkins
Vacant Title last held by Firat Arslan	WBA cruiserweight champion Regular title 21 May 2016 – 20 June 2017; Stripped	Vacant Title next held by Yuniel Dorticos
Vacant Title last held by Yuniel Dorticos	WBA cruiserweight champion Regular title 7 July 2018 – 27 March 2019; Promoted	Vacant Title next held by Himself
Vacant Title last held by Oleksandr Usyk as Super champion	WBA cruiserweight champion 27 March 2019 – 31 May 2019; Stripped	Vacant Title next held by Arsen Goulamirian
Preceded by Himself	WBA cruiserweight champion Regular title 1 September 2019 – 29 January 2021; Stripped	Succeeded by Ryad Merhy interim champion promoted
Honorary boxing titles
Preceded by Denis Lebedev as co-titlist until 30 June	WBA cruiserweight champion In recess 31 May – 1 September 2019; Reinstated as Regular champion	Vacant
