= Nigel Collins (writer) =

American boxer

Nigel Collins is a boxing writer for ESPN and former editor-in-chief of Ring Magazine. Collins is part of the 2015 class for the International Boxing Hall of Fame. The dismissal of Collins from Ring Magazine led to the formation of the Transnational Boxing Rankings Board.
