= Tavoris Cloud vs. Bernard Hopkins =

Boxing match

- Date: March 9, 2013
- Venue: Barclays Center, Brooklyn, New York, U.S.
- Title(s) on the line: IBF light heavyweight title

Tale of the tape
Boxer	Tavoris Cloud	Bernard Hopkins
Nickname	Thunder	The Executioner
Hometown	Tallahassee, Florida, U.S.	Philadelphia, Pennsylvania, U.S.
Purse	$500,000	$750,000
Pre-fight record	24–0 (19 KO)	52–6–2 (2) (32 KO)
Age	31 years, 1 month	48 years, 1 month
Height	5 ft 10 in (178 cm)	6 ft 1 in (185 cm)
Weight	174 lb (79 kg)	175 lb (79 kg)
Style	Orthodox	Orthodox
Recognition	IBF; Light Heavyweight Champion; The Ring/TBRB; No. 2 Ranked Light Heavyweight	IBF; No. 3 Ranked Light Heavyweight; The Ring/TBRB; No. 1 Ranked Light Heavyweight; 2-division world champion

Result
- Hopkins wins via unanimous decision (117–111, 116–112, 116–112)

Tavoris Cloud vs. Bernard Hopkins was a professional boxing match contested on March 9, 2013, for the IBF light heavyweight title.

== Background ==
In his last fight, Bernard Hopkins had lost the WBC and The Ring light heavyweight titles to Chad Dawson on April 28, 2012. It was not immediately known if the 47-year old Hopkins would fight again, with Hopkins himself expressing to the media "I could be a mentor in the game if I choose to go out that way" after the fight. However, in November of that year, it was announced by Golden Boy Promotions CEO Richard Schaefer that Hopkins would indeed return on March 9, 2013, to face one of the reigning light heavyweight champions at the time; IBF champion Tavoris Cloud, WBO champion Nathan Cleverly or WBA champion Beibut Shumenov at the Barclays Center in Brooklyn. The following month, Cloud was officially announced to be Hopkins opponent, with the IBF approving the fight in January after both fighters agreed to face mandatory challenger Karo Murat should they win. The bout was planned to be aired on Showtime's Showtime Championship Boxing, but HBO, who had long broadcast Hopkins fights, stepped in and made a deal with Golden Boy Promotions to air the fight instead.

In the months leading into the fight, Cloud fired his longtime trainer Al Bonanni and parted ways with his manager Jerry Attardi, enlisting Abel Sanchez as his new trainer and hip hop mogul James Prince as his new manager. Cloud mentioned that he had no "bad feelings" with Bonanni but "needed somebody with a more open mind and that happened to be Abel Sanchez." Sanchez likened the bout to the Ray Leonard–Terry Norris fight 22 years before, in which Norris, whom Sanchez trained, convincingly defeated the aging Leonard, predicting Cloud would do the same to Hopkins.

== The fight ==
Hopkins controlled the pace of the fight, thoroughly out landing Cloud in total punches and using his defense to stymie Cloud's offense. Though largely a tactical affair like most Hopkins fights, Hopkins did open a large cut above Cloud's left eye after landing a short left hook during the sixth round. Hopkins would land 41% of his total punches thrown and nearly half of his 227 thrown power punches while keeping Cloud to land just 21% (139 of 650) of his thrown punches. The fight would ultimately go the full 12-round distance with all three judges scoring the fight in Hopkins favor with two scores of 116–112 and one score of 117–111.

== Aftermath ==
With the victory, Hopkins became the oldest fighter to win a major world title, breaking the record he himself set when he beat Jean Pascal two years earlier at age 46.

== Fight card ==
Confirmed bouts:

=== Televised ===
Weight Class	Weight		vs.		Method	Round	Notes
Light Heavyweight	175 lbs.	Bernard Hopkins	def	Tavoris Cloud	UD	12/12	^{Note 1}
Welterweight	147 lbs.	Keith Thurman	def.	Jan Zaveck (c)	UD	12/12	^{Note 2}
Lightweight	135 lbs.	Michael Perez	vs.	Lonnie Smith	D	10/10

^Note 1 For IBF light heavyweight title
^Note 2 For WBO Inter-Continental welterweight title and WBO Welterweight title eliminator

=== Untelevised ===
Weight Class	Weight		vs.		Method	Round	Notes
Light middleweight	154 lbs.	Eddie Gomez	def	Javier Gomez Rueda	TKO	1/8
Light middleweight	154 lbs.	Frank Galarza	def.	Guillermo Ibarra	TKO	2/6
Light heavyweight	175 lbs.	Marcus Browne	def.	Josh Thorpe	TKO	1/4
Cruiserweight	200 lbs.	Stivens Bujaj	def.	Zeferino Albino	UD	4
Bantamweight	118 lbs.	Claude Staten Jr	def.	Mike Hill	UD	4

== Broadcasting ==
Country	Broadcaster
Australia	Main Event
Hungary	Sport 1
Norway	Viasat Sport
Panama	RPC
Poland	Polsat Sport
United Kingdom	BoxNation
United States	HBO

Preceded by vs. Gabriel Campillo	Tavoris Cloud's bouts 9 March 2013	Succeeded by vs. Adonis Stevenson
Preceded by vs. Chad Dawson II	Bernard Hopkins's bouts 9 March 2013	Succeeded by vs. Karo Murat
