= Jermain Taylor vs. Bernard Hopkins II =

2005 boxing match in Philadelphia, US

No Respect
- Date: December 3, 2005
- Venue: Mandalay Bay Events Center, Paradise, Nevada, U.S.
- Title(s) on the line: WBA, WBC, WBO and The Ring middleweight championship

Tale of the tape
| Boxer | Jermain Taylor | Bernard Hopkins |
| Nickname | Bad Intentions | The Executioner |
| Hometown | Little Rock, Arkansas, U.S. | Philadelphia, Pennsylvania, U.S. |
| Purse | $2,000,000 | $10,000,000 |
| Pre-fight record | 24–0 (17 KO) | 46–3–1 (1) (32 KO) |
| Age | 27 years, 3 months | 40 years, 10 months |
| Height | 6 ft 1 in (185 cm) | 6 ft 1 in (185 cm) |
| Weight | 159 lb (72 kg) | 160 lb (73 kg) |
| Style | Orthodox | Orthodox |
| Recognition | WBA, WBC, WBO and The Ring; Middleweight Champion | WBC/WBA/WBO; No. 2 Ranked Middleweight; The Ring; No. 1 Ranked Middleweight; Former undisputed middleweight champion |

Result
- Taylor wins via unanimous decision (115–113, 115–113, 115–113)

Jermain Taylor vs. Bernard Hopkins II, billed as No Respect, was a professional boxing match contested on December 3, 2005, for the WBA (Undisputed), WBC, WBO, and The Ring middleweight championships.

== Background ==
Just 4 1/2 months prior, Jermain Taylor had surprised the boxing world by scoring an upset victory over the reigning undisputed middleweight champion Bernard Hopkins, who had not lost in over 12 years and had made 20 consecutive title defenses, needing only one more to surpass Larry Holmes to the become the second fighter with the most defenses, after Joe Louis, who had 25 successful defenses as a Heavyweight champion during the late 1930s and the entirety of the 1940s. The fight was not without controversy as though Hopkins started off slowly, he took control of the later rounds and many in the media still had him as the clear winner. Hopkins took issue with the scoring of the final round by judge Duane Ford. Ford had scored the 12th round in favor of Taylor 10–9 in contrast to the other two judges who had given Hopkins the round 10–9. Hopkins filed an official appeal with the Nevada State Athletic Commission contending that Ford was incorrect in scoring the round for Taylor and had he scored the round in Hopkins' favor, the fight would've been declared a split draw, allowing Hopkins to keep his titles. Hopkins explained "I'd be doing a disservice if I didn't challenge something that's in dispute around the world, based on a judge thinking Jermain Taylor won a round that everybody else says I won." NSAC Marc Ratner admitted that an overturned decision was unlikely as they had not found anything to conclude that the Ford had either scored the fight incorrectly or colluded with other judges, but nevertheless submitted Hopkins' appeal to a five-man committee, who denied Hopkins' appeal three days later Though Hopkins was unsuccessful in his appeal, he still held a rematch clause from the previous fight's contract and had exercised it shortly after his defeat, officially putting the rematch on for later in the year. Hopkins and his team originally eyed an October 1 date for the rematch, but Taylor's manager Lou DiBella refused, stating that Taylor needed more time to heal from a deep gash he had sustained to his head during the first fight and December would be the earliest that the rematch would take place.

On 15 October the IBF stripped Taylor of their belt.

== The fight ==
In what was another close fight, Taylor would again defeat Hopkins, this time by unanimous decision with three identical scores of 115–113. Like their previous fight, Hopkins started off slowly with Taylor taking most of the early and middle rounds before Hopkins rebounded to take the later rounds, though he had already put himself in too big a hole to earn the decision. The punch stats were extremely close with Hopkins narrowly outlanding Taylor, scoring 130 of his 371 thrown punches as opposed to Taylor, who landed 124 of his 391 punches.

== Aftermath ==
Following his second loss to Taylor, Hopkins decided not to retire but instead he jumped two weight divisions to face off against light heavyweight champion Antonio Tarver.

== Fight card ==
Confirmed bouts:

| Weight Class | Weight | | vs. | | Method | Round | Notes |
|---|---|---|---|---|---|---|---|
| Middleweight | 160 lbs. | Jermain Taylor (c) | def | Bernard Hopkins | UD | 12/12 | ^{Note 1} |
| Super Bantamweight | 122 lbs. | Israel Vázquez | def. | Óscar Larios (c) | TKO | 3/12 | ^{Note 2} |
| Middlweight | 160 lbs. | Ike Quartey | def. | Carlos Bojorquez | TKO | 10/10 |
| Super Lightweight | 140 lbs. | Demetrius Hopkins | def. | Jesse Feliciano | KO | 4/10 |
| Super Welterweight | 154 lbs. | Joshua Clottey | def. | Marcos Primera | UD | 10/10 |
| Super Welterweight | 154 lbs. | Kofi Jantuah | def. | Donny McCrary | RTD | 3/8 |
| Middleweight | 160 lbs. | Andre Berto | def. | Taronze Washington | KO | 1/8 |
| Super Welterweight | 154 lbs. | Larry Mosley | def. | Jeremy Yelton | TKO | 4/8 |
| Welterweight | 147 lbs. | Rock Allen | def. | Calvin Pitts | TKO | 2/6 |

^Note 1 For WBA, WBC, WBO and The Ring middleweight titles
^Note 2 For WBC Super Bantamweight title

== Broadcasting ==
| Country | Broadcaster |
|---|---|
| Australia | Main Event |
| Hungary | Sport 1 |
| United States | HBO |

| Preceded by First bout | Jermain Taylor's bouts 3 December 2005 | Succeeded by vs. Winky Wright |
| Preceded by First bout | Bernard Hopkins's bouts 3 December 2005 | Succeeded by vs. Antonio Tarver |
