= Enrique Ornelas =

Mexican boxer

Personal information
- Born: Enrique Andrade Ornelas; September 17, 1980 (age 45) Jesús del Monte, Guanajuato, Mexico
- Height: 6 ft 1 1/2 in (187 cm)
- Weight: Middleweight

Boxing career
- Reach: 77 in (196 cm)
- Stance: Orthodox

Boxing record
- Total fights: 43
- Wins: 34
- Win by KO: 22
- Losses: 9

Enrique Andrade Ornelas (born September 17, 1980) is a Mexican professional boxer. A two-time world title challenger, Ornelas challenged for the WBO super middleweight title in 2010, as well as the WBA light heavyweight title in 2012.

== Background ==
Born in Jesús del Monte, Guanajuato, Mexico, Ornelas is the younger brother of super middleweight contender Librado Andrade.

== Career ==
Ornelas began his professional career on 16 October 1999, beating previously unbeaten Rigoberto Placencia on points over four rounds at the Marriott Hotel, Irvine, California.

=== Ornelas vs. Hopkins ===
On December 2, 2009, Ornelas fought Bernard Hopkins through 12-rounds but lost a unanimous decision. The bout took place in the light heavyweight division and Ornelas had never fought that high up in weight before.

=== First title shot ===
Ornelas went to Montreal for his first shot at a world title as he faced WBO champion Robert Stieglitz set for November 20. Stieglitz was stopped by Ornelas' half-brother Librado Andrade in 2008 and he made the third defense of the WBO crown.

He now makes his home in La Habra, California.

=== Professional boxing record ===
30 Wins (20 knockouts, 10 decisions), 6 Losses (1 by knockout, 5 by decision), 0 Draws
Res.	Opponent	Type	Rd	Date	Location	Notes
—N/a	TBA	—N/a	-(8)	2011-05-06	Fantasy Springs Casino, Indio, California, U.S.	
Loss	(Germany) Robert Stieglitz	UD	12 (12)	2010-11-20	Freiberger Arena, Dresden, Germany	For WBO Super Middleweight title.
Win	(United States) Julius Fogle	KO	4 (8)	2010-04-22	Club Nokia, Los Angeles, California, U.S.	
Loss	(United States) Bernard Hopkins	UD	12 (12)	2009-12-02	Liacouras Center, Philadelphia, Pennsylvania, U.S.	
Win	(Mexico) Roberto Baro	KO	4 (6)	2009-07-30	Club Nokia, Los Angeles, California, U.S.	
Loss	(Mexico) Marco Antonio Rubio	SD	12 (12)	2008-10-18	Boardwalk Hall, Atlantic City, New Jersey, U.S.	
Win	(United States) Daryl Salmon	TKO	2 (10)	2008-07-04	Dodge Arena Hidalgo, Texas, U.S.	
Win	(United States) Norberto Bravo	RTD	7 (12)	2008-02-22	Morongo Casino, Resort & Spa, Cabazon, California, U.S.	NABF middleweight title
Win	(United States) Bronco McKart	RTD	5 (12)	2007-12-07	MGM Grand, Las Vegas, Nevada, U.S.	NABF middleweight title
Loss	(United States) Bronco McKart	SD	12 (12)	2007-08-10	New Alhambra, Philadelphia, Pennsylvania, U.S.	vacant NABF middleweight title
Loss	(Australia) Sam Soliman	MD	10 (10)	2006-11-17	Soboba Casino, San Jacinto, California, U.S.	
Win	(United States) Raul Munoz	TKO	1 (8)	2006-08-18	Pechanga Resort and Casino, Temecula, California, U.S.	
