= List of U.S. national Golden Gloves champions =

- List of U.S. national Golden Gloves light flyweight champions
- List of U.S. national Golden Gloves flyweight champions
- List of U.S. national Golden Gloves bantamweight champions
- List of U.S. national Golden Gloves featherweight champions
- List of U.S. national Golden Gloves lightweight champions
- List of U.S. national Golden Gloves light welterweight champions
- List of U.S. national Golden Gloves welterweight champions
- List of U.S. national Golden Gloves light middleweight champions
- List of U.S. national Golden Gloves middleweight champions
- List of U.S. national Golden Gloves light heavyweight champions
- List of U.S. national Golden Gloves heavyweight champions
- List of U.S. national Golden Gloves super heavyweight champions
