= Steve Geffrard =

American boxer

Personal information
- Nickname: The Balding Eagle
- Nationality: American
- Born: August 28, 1990 (age 35) Miami, Florida, U.S.
- Height: 6 ft 2 in (188 cm)
- Weight: Light heavyweight

Boxing career
- Reach: 58 in (147 cm)
- Stance: Orthodox

Boxing record
- Total fights: 39
- Wins: 21
- Win by KO: 3
- Losses: 18
- Draws: 0
- No contests: 0

Steve Geffrard (born August 28, 1990) is an American professional boxer.

== Amateur career ==
Geffrard was the US amateur triple crown in 2010, winning the Police Athletic League title, the US Golden Gloves heavyweight title, and the US national amateur heavyweight title.

== Professional career ==
On January 15, 2022, Geffrard was scheduled to fight Joe Smith Jr. for the WBO light heavyweight title; Geffrard took the fight on 8 days notice replacing Callum Johnson who tested positive for COVID-19. Geffrard lost the fight, being stopped in the 9th round.
