= Tavoris Cloud =

American boxer

Personal information
- Nickname: Thunder
- Nationality: American
- Born: Tavoris Karod Cloud; January 10, 1982 (age 44) Tallahassee, Florida, U.S.
- Height: 5 ft 10 in (178 cm)
- Weight: Light heavyweight

Boxing career
- Reach: 74 in (188 cm)
- Stance: Orthodox

Boxing record
- Total fights: 28
- Wins: 25
- Win by KO: 20
- Losses: 3

Tavoris Karod Cloud (born January 10, 1982) is an American professional boxer who held the IBF light heavyweight title from 2009 to 2013.

== Early life ==
When interviewed by ESPN, Tavoris Cloud explained that he had a tough childhood. His neighbourhood, as he recalled, was very rough. He lived in a small home that housed at times 10-15 people. It was a very poor environment. He went on to explain how meager his family's situation was, and spoke on how his family used a foot tub with ice in it as a fridge. His mother Emma Smith, reflected upon the day that Tavoris Cloud declared that he was going to take care of this situation. He was around 14–15 years of age. Alonzo Johnson (Boxing Coach), trained and housed Tavoris during his high school years. Tavoris trained with Alonzo Johnson since his amateur days. Johnson worked in his corner alongside head trainer Al Bonanni during Cloud's professional fights.

== Amateur career ==
Cloud competed at the 2002 U.S. national amateur championships, losing in the final of the light heavyweight bracket to Curtis Stevens.

== Professional career ==
On August 8, 2008, at the Aragon Ballroom in Chicago, Cloud defeated former WBO Light Heavyweight Champion Julio César González by technical knockout in the tenth round in an IBF Light Heavyweight title eliminator. Cloud set the tempo of the fight early, hurting Gonzalez with a right cross in dominating the first round. It was more of the same in the next two rounds, although Gonzalez made the third round the most competitive. He kept the fight in the middle of the ring, but Cloud kept sending him back with uppercuts and left hooks. With González taking a beating for the majority of the fight, in round ten, the referee stopped the fight after Cloud landed a right hand.

=== IBF light heavyweight champion ===
Tavoris won the IBF Light Heavyweight title against the durable Clinton Woods by way of a 12-round unanimous decision after former champion Chad Dawson vacated the belt. The fight against Clinton Woods took place on August 28, 2009. Cloud threw well over 1000 punches in the fight which is well over the average for that weight division and won the fight by unanimous decision after 12 rounds.

Cloud defeated Glen Johnson by unanimous decision on August 7, 2010.

Cloud faced the Colombian knockout artist Fulgencio Zuniga (24-5-1 (20 KO)) for a title defense and earned a unanimous decision.

Following the Zuniga win, Cloud improved his record with another TKO decision over Yusaf Mack.

Cloud defeated Spaniard Gabriel Campillo via split decision. The win stirred up controversy, with fans scoring the bout for Campillo. However, unbeknown to Fans, "the referee said that there are no standing eight counts..."- A statement Tavoris Cloud made to Lem Satterfield when interviewed for The Ring Magazine's website The Ring. Tavoris Cloud further stated, "when we got in there the first round, and I dropped him, the referee pulled me out of the way and started to give him an eight count. I mean, that's the fight right there."

Cloud's next opponent was thought to be Former World Champion and Commonwealth Games Gold Medalist: Jean Pascal, with a scheduled fight date of August 11, 2012, but Pascal pulled out of the fight last minute due to a hand injury suffered in training. Cloud adamantly believes the injury was faked.

=== Consecutive defeats to Hopkins, Stevenson, Beterbiev ===
Cloud later took on Bernard Hopkins on March 9, 2013, at the Barclays center in Brooklyn and lost his IBF Championship via Unanimous Decision (UD).

In the following September Cloud challenged Adonis Stevenson for the WBC light-heavyweight title, and took a beating before quitting in his corner.

On September 27, 2014, Cloud faced Dagestan contender Artur Beterbiev. Right from the start Cloud was outmatched and unable to cope with the power of his vastly larger foe, getting dropped three times in the first round before finally being for the last time early in the second. Cloud was unable to beat referee Michael Griffin's count, making this his third consecutive loss. Comeback.

On November 20, 2020, after a more than 6-year hiatus, Cloud returned to the ring and fought out of Deadgame Fight School, defeating Ryan Soft by 3rd-round TKO in Daytona Beach, Florida.

== Professional boxing record ==
28 fights	25 wins	3 losses
By knockout	20	2
By decision	5	1

No.	Result	Record	Opponent	Type	Round, time	Date	Location	Notes
28	Win	25–3	Ryan Soft	TKO	3 (8), 1:29	Nov 20, 2020	Ocean Center, Daytona Beach, Florida, U.S.	
27	Loss	24–3	Artur Beterbiev	KO	2 (12), 0:38	Sep 27, 2014	Bell Centre, Montreal, Quebec, Canada	For vacant WBA–NABA light heavyweight title
26	Loss	24–2	Adonis Stevenson	RTD	7 (12), 3:00	Sep 28, 2013	Bell Centre, Montreal, Quebec, Canada	For WBC and The Ring light heavyweight titles
25	Loss	24–1	Bernard Hopkins	UD	12	Mar 9, 2013	Barclays Center, New York City, New York, U.S.	Lost IBF light heavyweight title
24	Win	24–0	Gabriel Campillo	SD	12	Feb 18, 2012	American Bank Center, Corpus Christi, Texas, U.S.	Retained IBF light heavyweight title
23	Win	23–0	Yusaf Mack	TKO	8 (12), 2:57	Jun 25, 2011	Family Arena, St. Charles, Missouri, U.S.	Retained IBF light heavyweight title
22	Win	22–0	Fulgencio Zúñiga	UD	12	Dec 17, 2010	American Airlines Arena, Miami, Florida, U.S.	Retained IBF light heavyweight title
21	Win	21–0	Glen Johnson	UD	12	Aug 7, 2010	Scottrade Center, St. Louis, Missouri, U.S.	Retained IBF light heavyweight title
20	Win	20–0	Clinton Woods	UD	12	Aug 28, 2009	Hard Rock Live, Hollywood, Florida, U.S.	Won vacant IBF light heavyweight title
19	Win	19–0	Julio César González	TKO	10 (12), 1:50	Aug 8, 2008	Aragon Ballroom, Chicago, Illinois, U.S.	
18	Win	18–0	Mike Wood	KO	1 (12), 1:23	Mar 28, 2008	Aragon Ballroom, Chicago, Illinois, U.S.	Won vacant WBA–NABA, IBF–USBA, and WBO–NABO light heavyweight titles
17	Win	17–0	Jacob Rodriguez	RTD	3 (8), 0:01	Dec 14, 2007	Cicero Stadium, Cicero, Illinois, U.S.	
16	Win	16–0	Jose Luis Herrera	TKO	5 (10), 1:45	Aug 24, 2007	Congress Theater, Chicago, Illinois, U.S.	
15	Win	15–0	Jim Strohl	KO	1 (10), 2:59	May 11, 2007	Cicero Stadium, Cicero, Illinois, U.S.	
14	Win	14–0	Aaron Norwood	KO	2 (8), 2:03	Feb 16, 2007	Cicero Stadium, Cicero, Illinois, U.S.	
13	Win	13–0	Douglas LaFontsee	TKO	4 (8), 1:55	Nov 10, 2006	Cicero Stadium, Cicero, Illinois, U.S.	
12	Win	12–0	Tim Shocks	TKO	4 (8), 0:15	Sep 15, 2006	Aragon Ballroom, Chicago, Illinois, U.S.	
11	Win	11–0	Mitch Hicks	TKO	1 (8), 2:10	Jul 21, 2006	Aragon Ballroom, Chicago, Illinois, U.S.	
10	Win	10–0	Anthony Dennis	TKO	2 (8), 2:08	Mar 17, 2006	Aragon Ballroom, Chicago, Illinois, U.S.	
9	Win	9–0	Roosevelt Johnson	KO	4 (8), 1:30	Jan 27, 2006	Farm Bureau Building, Indianapolis, Indiana, U.S.	
8	Win	8–0	Ron Krull	TKO	2 (8), 1:23	Nov 3, 2005	Civic Center, Hammond, Indiana, U.S.	
7	Win	7–0	Joseph Hill	TKO	3 (4), 2:47	Jul 13, 2005	Majestic Star Casino, Gary, Indiana, U.S.	
6	Win	6–0	Reggie Strickland	UD	4	May 6, 2005	Farm Bureau Building, Indianapolis, Indiana, U.S.	
5	Win	5–0	Ronald Moore	TKO	1 (4), 2:03	Dec 11, 2004	Greensboro, North Carolina, U.S.	
4	Win	4–0	Curtis Mullins	TKO	3 (4), 3:00	Nov 20, 2004	Greensboro, North Carolina, U.S.	
3	Win	3–0	Kevin Thompson	TKO	1 (4), 3:00	Oct 23, 2004	Greensboro, North Carolina, U.S.	
2	Win	2–0	Taryll Carpenter	TKO	1 (4), 2:05	Oct 9, 2004	Lighthouse Convention Center, Raleigh, North Carolina, U.S.	
1	Win	1–0	Luis Reyes	TKO	3 (4), 2:39	Apr 2, 2004	Equestrian Complex, Ocala, Florida, U.S.	

Sporting positions
Regional boxing titles
Vacant Title last held by Chris Henry	WBA–NABA light heavyweight champion March 28, 2008 – June 2008; Vacated	Vacant Title next held by Yusaf Mack
Vacant Title last held by Montell Griffin	IBF–USBA light heavyweight champion March 28, 2008 – August 2008; Vacated	Vacant Title next held by Otis Griffin
Vacant Title last held by DeAndrey Abron	WBO–NABO light heavyweight champion March 28, 2008 – August 2008; Vacated	Vacant Title next held by Roy Jones Jr.
World boxing titles
Vacant Title last held by Chad Dawson	IBF light heavyweight champion August 28, 2009 – March 9, 2013	Succeeded by Bernard Hopkins
