= Transnational Boxing Rankings Board =

All-volunteer initiative formed in 2012

Transnational Boxing Rankings
- Abbreviation: TBRB
- Formation: 2012
- Founders: Springs Toledo; Stewart Howe; Cliff Rold; Tim Starks
- Type: Volunteer organization
- Purpose: Boxing Rankings
- Volunteers: 50+ professional journalists and boxing historians
- Website: www.tbrb.org

The Transnational Boxing Rankings Board (TBRB) is an all-volunteer initiative formed in October 2012 with the intention of providing professional boxing with top-ten rankings, identifying the singular world champion of every division and to insist on the sport's reform. Board members are independent professional journalists, boxing historians and record keepers from around the world. Their rankings and titles are meant to be uninfluenced by promoters and the traditional sanctioning bodies.

== TBRB championships ==
The TBRB awards championships when the top-ranked fighters in any division meet, and currently recognizes legitimate world champions or "true champions" in each weight class. It also presents the "successions" of these championship "thrones."

Three of its recognized champions were identified by The Ring magazine before the TBRB was founded. Thus, the TBRB was formed to continue where The Ring "left off" in the aftermath of the latter's purchase by Golden Boy Promotions in 2007, and the following dismissal of the editorial board headed by Nigel Collins. After the new editors announced a controversial new championship policy in May 2012, three members of the Ring Advisory Panel resigned. These three members (Springs Toledo, Cliff Rold and Tim Starks) became the founding members of the TBRB, which was formed over the summer of 2012 with the assistance of Stewart Howe of England.

ESPN boxing analyst and commentator Teddy Atlas praised the TBRB's efforts on-air in March 2013 and again during the season finale in August 2013.

British magazine Boxing News announced in 2021 that it would only recognize world champions as voted by the TBRB.

== TBRB Voting Panel members ==
There are currently members representing 21 countries on five continents: Argentina, Australia, Canada, Chile, Costa Rica, England, India, Ireland, Italy, Japan, Mexico, New Zealand, Norway, the Philippines, Russia, Scotland, Spain, Sweden, Thailand, the United States, Vietnam, and the commonwealth of Puerto Rico.

== Successions ==
The following are the lineal champions recognized by the Transnational Boxing Rankings Board:

Heavyweight

- (Ukraine) Oleksandr Usyk W12 (United Kingdom) Anthony Joshua (20 August 2022 – Usyk and Joshua were the top two Transnational-Ranked heavyweights at the time of this bout. Throne declared open as of 15 August 2022 when Fury finally confirmed repeated claims of retirement by vacating a belt.)
- (United Kingdom) Tyson Fury TKO7 (United States) Deontay Wilder (22 February 2020 – Fury and Wilder were the top two Transnational-Ranked heavyweights at the time of this bout).
- (United Kingdom) Tyson Fury W12 (Ukraine) Wladimir Klitschko (28 November 2015). (Fury officially abdicates throne 18 October 2016).
- (Ukraine) Wladimir Klitschko W12 (Russia) Alexander Povetkin (5 October 2013 – Klitschhko and Povetkin were the top two Transnational-Ranked heavyweights at the time of this bout).

Cruiserweight

- (Australia) Jai Opetaia W12 (Latvia) Mairis Briedis (2 July 2022)
- (Latvia) Mairis Briedis W12 (Cuba) Yuniel Dorticos (26 September 2020 – Briedis and Dorticós were the top two Transnational-Ranked cruiserweights at the time of this bout).
- (Ukraine) Oleksandr Usyk W12 (Russia) Murat Gassiev (21 July 2018 – Usyk and Gassiev were the top two Transnational-Ranked cruiserweights at the time of this bout). (Usyk officially abdicates throne 15 October 2019).

Light heavyweight

- (Russia) Dmitry Bivol MD12 (Russia) Artur Beterbiev (22 February 2025)
- (Russia) Artur Beterbiev TKO10 (Ukraine) Oleksandr Gvozdyk (18 October 2019)
- (Ukraine) Oleksandr Gvozdyk KO11 (Canada) Adonis Stevenson (1 December 2018)
- (Canada) Adonis Stevenson KO1 (United States) Chad Dawson (8 June 2013)
- (United States) Chad Dawson W12 Bernard Hopkins (28 April 2012)
- (United States) Bernard Hopkins W12 (Canada) Jean Pascal (21 May 2011)
- (Canada) Jean Pascal TD11 (United States) Chad Dawson (14 August 2010 – Pascal and Dawson were the top two RING-rated light heavyweights at the time of this bout).

Super middleweight

- (United States) Terence Crawford UD12 (Mexico) Saul Alvarez (13 September 2025)
- (Mexico) Saul Alvarez W12 (United States) Caleb Plant (6 November 2021 – Alvarez and Plant were the top two Transnational-Ranked super middleweights at the time of this bout).
- (United States) Andre Ward W12 (United Kingdom) Carl Froch (17 December 2011 – Ward and Froch were the top-two RING-rated super middleweights at the time of this bout). (Ward officially abdicates throne 16 March 2016).

Middleweight

- (Mexico) Saul Alvarez W12 (Kazakhstan) Gennady Golovkin (15 September 2018). (Alvarez officially abdicates throne 1 January 2021).
- (Mexico) Saul Alvarez W12 (Puerto Rico) Miguel Cotto (21 November 2015). (Alvarez officially abdicates throne 18 April 2017).
- (Puerto Rico) Miguel Cotto RTD10 (Argentina) Sergio Martínez (7 June 2014)
- (Argentina) Sergio Martínez W12 (United States) Kelly Pavlik (17 April 2010)
- (United States) Kelly Pavlik TKO7 (United States) Jermain Taylor (29 September 2007)
- (United States) Jermain Taylor W12 (United States) Bernard Hopkins (16 July 2005)
- (United States) Bernard Hopkins TKO12 (Puerto Rico) Félix Trinidad (29 September 2001 – Hopkins and Trinidad were the top two RING-rated middleweights at the time of this bout).

Super welterweight

- (United States) Jermell Charlo TKO10 (Argentina) Brian Castaño (14 May 2022 – Charlo and Castaño were the top two Transnational-Ranked jr. middleweights at the time of this bout). Throne declared open as of 19 May 2025 when, having reached three years without a fight at or defense of the title at Jr. Middleweight, Jermell Charlo is ruled to have abandoned his crown.
- (United States) Floyd Mayweather Jr. W12 (Mexico) Canelo Álvarez (14 September 2013 – Alvarez and Mayweather were the top two Transnational-Ranked jr. middleweights at the time of this bout). (Mayweather officially abdicates throne 21 September 2015).

Welterweight

- (United States) Terence Crawford TKO9 (United States) Errol Spence Jr. (29 July 2023 – Crawford and Spence were the top two Transnational-Ranked welterweights at the time of this bout).Throne declared open as of 21 October 2024 with Terence Crawford’s abdication.
- (Philippines) Manny Pacquiao W12 (United States) Timothy Bradley (12 April 2016 – Pacquiao and Bradley were the top two Transnational-Ranked welterweights at the time of this bout). (Pacquiao officially abdicates throne 19 April 2016).
- (United States) Floyd Mayweather Jr. W12 (Philippines) Manny Pacquiao (2 May 2015 – Mayweather and Pacquiao were the top two Transnational-Ranked welterweights at the time of this bout). (Mayweather officially abdicates throne 21 September 2015).

Super lightweight

- (United States) Shakur Stevenson W12 (United States) Teofilo Lopez (31 January 2026)
- (United States) Teófimo López W12 (United Kingdom) Josh Taylor (10 June 2023)
- (United Kingdom) Josh Taylor W12 (United States) José Ramírez (22 May 2021 – Taylor and Ramírez were the top two Transnational-Ranked jr. welterweights at the time of this bout).
- (United States) Mikey Garcia W12 (Russia) Sergey Lipinets (10 March 2018 – Garcia and Lipinets were the top two Transnational-Ranked jr. welterweights at the time of this bout). (Garcia officially abdicates throne 3 March 2020).
- (United States) Terence Crawford W12 (Ukraine) Viktor Postol (23 July 2016 – Postol and Crawford were the top two Transnational-Ranked jr. welterweights at the time of this bout). (Crawford officially abdicates throne 6 March 2018).
- (United States) Danny Garcia W12 (Argentina) Lucas Matthysse (14 September 2013 – Matthysse and Garcia were the top two Transnational-Ranked jr. welterweights at the time of this bout). (Garcia officially abdicates throne August 2015).

Lightweight

- (United States) Devin Haney W12 (Australia) George Kambosos Jr. (4 June 2022)(Throne declared open 11 December 2023 after Devin Haney’s debut in the jr. welterweight division.)
- (Australia) George Kambosos Jr. W12 Teófimo López (27 November 2021)
- (United States) Teófimo López W12 (Ukraine) Vasyl Lomachenko (17 October 2020 – López and Lomachenko were the top two Transnational-Ranked lightweights at the time of this bout).
- (United States) Terence Crawford W12 (Mexico) Raymundo Beltran (29 November 2014 – Crawford and Beltran were the top two Transnational-Ranked lightweights at the time of this bout). (Crawford officially abdicates throne 18 April 2015).

Super featherweight

- (United States) Shakur Stevenson W12 (Mexico) Óscar Valdez (30 April 2022 – Stevenson and Valdez were the top two Transnational-Ranked jr. lightweights at the time of this bout). (Stevenson officially stripped of the throne 23 September 2022 after missing weight).

Super bantamweight

- (Japan) Naoya Inoue KO10 (Philippines) Marlon Tapales (26 December 2023 – Inoue and Tapales were the top two Transnational-Ranked jr. featherweights at the time of this bout).
- (Cuba) Guillermo Rigondeaux W12 Nonito Donaire (13 April 2013) (Rigondeaux officially abdicates throne 11 June 2022 by TBRB).
- (Philippines) Nonito Donaire TKO9 (Japan) Toshiaki Nishioka (13 October 2012 – Nishioka and Donaire were the top two Transnational-Ranked jr. featherweights at the time of this bout).

Bantamweight

- (Japan) Naoya Inoue TKO2 (Philippines) Nonito Donaire (7 June 2022 – Inoue and Donaire were the top two Transnational-Ranked bantamweights at the time of this bout). (Inoue officially abdicates throne 13 January 2023).

Super flyweight

- Jesse Rodriguez KO7 Juan Francisco Estrada (29 June 2024)
- (Mexico) Juan Francisco Estrada W12 Srisaket Sor Rungvisai (26 April 2019)
- (Thailand) Srisaket Sor Rungvisai W12 Juan Francisco Estrada (24 February 2018 – Sor Rungvisai and Estrada were the top two Transnational-Ranked jr. bantamweights at the time of this bout).

Flyweight

- (Nicaragua) Román González TKO9 Akira Yaegashi (5 September 2014). (Gonzalez officially abdicates throne 4 October 2016).
- (Japan) Akira Yaegashi W12 Toshiyuki Igarashi (8 April 2013)
- (Japan) Toshiyuki Igarashi W12 Sonny Boy Jaro (16 July 2012)
- (Philippines) Sonny Boy Jaro TKO6 Pongsaklek Wonjongkam (2 March 2012)
- (Thailand) Pongsaklek Wonjongkam W12 Koki Kameda (27 March 2010)
- (Japan) Kōki Kameda W12 Daisuke Naito (29 November 2009)
- (Japan) Daisuke Naitō W12 Pongsaklek Wonjongkam (18 July 2007)
- (Thailand) Pongsaklek Wonjongkam TKO1 Malcolm Tunacao (2 March 2001)
- (Philippines) Malcolm Tuñacao TKO7 Medgoen Singsurat (19 May 2000)
- (Thailand) Medgoen Singsurat TKO 3 Manny Pacquiao (17 September 1999)
- (Philippines) Manny Pacquiao KO8 Chatchai Sasakul (4 December 1998)
- (Thailand) Chatchai Sasakul W12 Yuri Arbachakov (12 November 1997)
- (Russia) (Japan) Yuri Arbachakov KO8 Muangchai Kittikasem (23 June 1992)
- (Thailand) Muangchai Kittikasem TKO6 Sot Chitalada (15 February 1991)
- (Thailand) Sot Chitalada W12 Yong-Kang Kim (3 June 1989)
- (South Korea) Yong-Kang Kim W12 Sot Chitalada (24 July 1988)
- (Thailand) Sot Chitalada W12 Gabriel Bernal (8 October 1984)
- (Philippines) Gabriel Bernal KO2 Koji Kabayashi (9 April 1984)
- (Japan) Kōji Kobayashi TKO2 Frank Cedeno (18 January 1984)
- (Philippines) Frank Cedeno TKO6 Charlie Magri (27 September 1983)
- (Philippines) Charlie Magri TKO7 Eleoncio Mercedes (15 March 1983)
- (Mexico) Eleoncio Mercedes W15 Freddie Castillo (6 November 1982)
- (Dominican Republic) Freddie Castillo W15 Prudencio Cardona (24 July 1982)
- (Colombia) Prudencio Cardona KO1 Antonio Avelar (20 March 1982)
- (Mexico) Antonio Avelar KO7 Shoji Oguma (12 May 1981)
- (Japan) Shoji Oguma KO9 Chan-Hee Park (18 May 1980)
- (South Korea) Chan-Hee Park W15 Miguel Canto (18 March 1979)
- (Mexico) Miguel Canto W15 Shoji Oguma (8 January 1975 – Canto and Oguma were the top two RING-rated flyweights at the time of this bout).

Junior Flyweight

- (Japan) Kenshiro Teraji TKO7 (Japan) Hiroto Kyoguchi (1 November 2022 – Teraji and Kyoguchi were the top two Transnational-Ranked jr. flyweights at the time of this bout.) (Throne declared open 14 October 2024 after Kenshiro Teraji abdicates and debuts at flyweight.)

== Current champions (men) ==
As of 1 March 2026

Weight	Champion	Record
Heavyweight	Oleksandr Usyk (UKR)	24–0-0 (15)
Cruiserweight	Jai Opetaia (AUS)	29–0-0 (23)
Light heavyweight	Dmitry Bivol (RUS)	24–1-0 (12)
Super middleweight	vacant	–
Middleweight	vacant	–
Junior middleweight	vacant	–
Welterweight	vacant	–
Junior welterweight	Shakur Stevenson (USA)	25–0–0 (11)
Lightweight	vacant	–
Junior lightweight	vacant	–
Featherweight	vacant	–
Junior featherweight	Naoya Inoue (JPN)	33–0-0 (27)
Bantamweight	vacant	–
Junior bantamweight	Jesse Rodriguez (USA)	23–0-0 (16)
Flyweight	vacant	–
Junior flyweight	vacant	–
Strawweight	vacant	

== Current champions (women) ==
As of 1 March 2026

Weight	Champion	Record
Heavyweight	Claressa Shields (USA)	17–0-0 (3)
Light heavyweight	vacant	-
Super middleweight	Shadasia Green (USA)	16-1-0 (11)
Middleweight	Claressa Shields (USA)	17–0-0 (3)
Junior middleweight		
Welterweight	Lauren Price (GBR)	9-0-0 (2)
Junior welterweight	Katie Taylor (IRL)	25-1-0 (6)
Lightweight	vacant	–
Junior lightweight	Alycia Baumgardner (USA)	17-1-0 (7)
Featherweight	Amanda Serrano (PUR)	48-4-1 (31)
Junior featherweight	Ellie Scotney (GBR)	11-0-0 (0)
Bantamweight	Cherneka Johnson (AUS)	19-2-0 (8)
Junior bantamweight	Mizuki Hiruta (JAP)	10-0-0 (2)
Flyweight	Gabriela Fundora (USA)	17-0-0 (9)
Junior flyweight	vacant	-
Strawweight	vacant	-
Atomweight	vacant	-

== Current Pound-for-pound (men) ==
As of 29 June 2026

Rank	Boxer	Record	Weight class
1	(Japan) Naoya Inoue	33–0–0 (27)	Junior Featherweight
2	(United States) Jesse Rodriguez	24–0–0 (17)	Bantamweight
3	(United States) Shakur Stevenson	25–0–0 (11)	Lightweight / Junior Welterweight
4	(Russia) Dmitry Bivol	25–1–0 (12)	Light Heavyweight
5	(United States) David Benavidez	32–0–0 (26)	Light Heavyweight / Cruiserweight
6	(Ukraine) Oleksandr Usyk	25–0–0 (16)	Heavyweight
7	(United States) Jaron Ennis	36–0–0 (32)	Junior Middleweight
8	(Mexico) Canelo Alvarez	63–3–2 (39)	Super Middleweight
9	(Japan) Junto Nakatani	32–1–0 (24)	Junior Featherweight
10	(Puerto Rico) Oscar Collazo	15–0–0 (12)	Strawweight

== List of pound for pound #1 fighters ==
As of November 2, 2026.

Keys:

Current P4P #1

No.	Name	Weight Division(s) as #1	Date	Duration
1	Floyd Mayweather Jr	Welterweight; Light middleweight	February 23, 2013 – September 22, 2015	2 years, 211 days
2	Román González	Flyweight; Super flyweight	September 22, 2015 – March 21, 2017	1 year, 180 days
3	Andre Ward	Light heavyweight	March 21 – September 26, 2017	189 days
4	Terence Crawford	Light welterweight	September 26, 2017 – May 15, 2018	231 days
5	Vasiliy Lomachenko	Lightweight	May 15, 2018 – November 5, 2019	1 year, 174 days
6	Canelo Álvarez	Middleweight; Super middleweight; Light heavyweight	November 5, 2019 – November 3, 2020	364 days
7	Naoya Inoue	Bantamweight	November 3 – December 22, 2020	49 days
8	Canelo Álvarez (2)	Super middleweight	December 22, 2020 – May 9, 2022	1 year, 138 days
9	Oleksandr Usyk	Heavyweight	May 9 – June 13, 2022	35 days
10	Naoya Inoue (2)	Bantamweight; Super bantamweight	June 13, 2022 – Aug 1, 2023	1 year, 49 days
11	Terence Crawford (2)	Welterweight	August 1, 2023 – May 6, 2024	279 days
11	Naoya Inoue (3)	Super bantamweight	May 6 – May 21, 2024	15 days
12	Oleksandr Usyk (2)	Heavyweight	May 21, 2024 – September 15, 2025	1 year, 117 days
13	Terence Crawford (3)	Super middleweight	September 15, 2025 – December 29, 2025	105 days
14	Naoya Inoue (4)	Super bantamweight	December 29, 2025 – present	308 days

== Pound-for-pound (women) ==
As of 4 May 2026

Rank	Boxer	Record	Weight class
1	(Republic of Ireland) Katie Taylor	25-1-0 (6)	Junior Welterweight
2	(United States) Claressa Shields	17-0-0 (3)	Heavyweight / Middleweight
3	(United States) Mikaela Mayer	22-2-0 (5)	Junior Middleweight / Welterweight
4	(United Kingdom) Chantelle Cameron	21-1-0 (8)	Junior Welterweight
5	(Costa Rica) Yokasta Valle	34-3-0 (10)	Strawweight / Flyweight
6	(Denmark) Dina Thorslund	24-0-0 (9)	Featherweight
7	(United States) Gabriela Fundora	17-0-0 (9)	Flyweight
8	(Puerto Rico) Amanda Serrano	48-4-1 (31)	Junior Welterweight / Featherweight
9	(United Kingdom) Lauren Price	9-0-0 (2)	Welterweight
10	(United Kingdom) Ellie Scotney	11-0-0 (0)	Junior Featherweight

== also ==
- Lineal championship
