= Bernard Hopkins vs. Chad Dawson =

Boxing competition

Believe It Or Not
- Date: October 15, 2011
- Venue: Staples Center, Los Angeles, California
- Title(s) on the line: WBC and The Ring light heavyweight titles

Tale of the tape
Boxer	Bernard Hopkins	Chad Dawson
Nickname	The Executioner	Bad
Hometown	Philadelphia, Pennsylvania	New Haven, Connecticut
Purse	$1,000,000	$800,000
Pre-fight record	52–5–2 (1) (32 KO)	30–1 (1) (17 KO)
Age	46 years, 9 months	29 years, 3 months
Height	6 ft 1 in (185 cm)	6 ft 1 in (185 cm)
Weight	173 1/2 lb (79 kg)	174 1/4 lb (79 kg)
Style	Orthodox	Southpaw
Recognition	WBC and The Ring; Light Heavyweight Champion; 2-division world champion	WBC; No. 1 Ranked Light Heavyweight; The Ring; No. 3 Ranked Light Heavyweight; Former WBC and IBF light heavyweight champion

Result
- No contest (Originally TKO for Dawson, later ruled NC after an incorrect referee call)

Bernard Hopkins vs. Chad Dawson was a boxing match contested for the WBC and The Ring light heavyweight championships.

The fight took place at Staples Center, Los Angeles, California, United States on 15 October 2011. Hopkins was making the first defense of the titles he won from Jean Pascal in Montreal, Quebec, Canada earlier in 2011 while Dawson was looking to win the WBC title for a second time and the Ring title for the first time. The fight was the main event of an HBO pay-per-view presentation.

The fight ended in the second round when Dawson lifted Hopkins, who stumbled, fell, and landed on his shoulder. Referee Pat Russell, seeing Hopkins could not continue, awarded Dawson a technical knockout. The result was contested shortly after the fight, and the WBC declared a technical draw naming Hopkins its champion. On December 13, the California State Athletic Commission, whose results are official and binding, overturned Russell's original technical knockout decision and declared the fight a no contest. This ruling made Hopkins retain his title and still be considered the official champion.

== Background ==
=== Bernard Hopkins ===
Hopkins fought Pascal in a rematch of a fight that had ended in controversy on 18 December 2010 in Quebec City, Quebec. In that fight, Pascal was making the first defense of the Ring light heavyweight championship he won from Dawson in his last fight and the fourth defense of the WBC title he took from Adrian Diaconu on 19 June 2009. The fight ended in a majority draw, with two of the three judges voting the fight even while the third gave Hopkins the victory.

During the course of the fight Hopkins landed many more punches than the champion (131 to 70 total) and won a unanimous decision despite the referee not counting two potential knockdowns when Pascal's glove touched the canvas. Hopkins won a closer decision due to those calls, but with his victory he broke the record held by George Foreman as the oldest professional boxing champion ever. Hopkins was 46 when he won the fight, beating the old record Foreman set at 45 when he won his second heavyweight championship.

=== Chad Dawson ===
Dawson also fought on the card for the second contest, which was his first fight since losing a unanimous technical decision to Pascal after the fight was stopped due to Dawson being cut from an accidental clash of heads. Although Dawson had a rematch clause in his contract, he chose not to exercise it and then signed to fight former champion Diaconu with the winner getting the first shot at the winner of Pascal-Hopkins II. Dawson won by unanimous decision over Diaconu to set up the match with Hopkins.

== The fight ==
After an uneventful first round, controversy marred the second round and the fight itself. While in a clinch, Dawson pushed his shoulder into Hopkins to break it. Hopkins was lifted off the ground, stumbled back and fell through the ropes, landing awkwardly on his shoulder. Referee Pat Russell checked on Hopkins, who said he could continue "with one arm". Russell elected not to let Hopkins continue and stopped the fight, awarding Dawson a technical knockout. This would have been the first time Hopkins had been knocked out in his career.

== Aftermath ==
Hopkins and his promoter Richard Schaefer both said they would protest the result; Hopkins said a foul should have been called on Dawson and the result should have been a no contest. Dawson and his promoter Gary Shaw claimed that no matter what happens, he will not fight Hopkins again. Shaw said that the former champion "didn't want to fight." Hopkins later decided to seek a change from a no-contest to a disqualification of Dawson, which would have given him the victory.

On October 20, the WBC announced that it agreed that Dawson had thrown and pushed Hopkins with intent to injure him, and its new decision is a technical draw. The WBC has reinstated Hopkins as its light heavyweight champion. On December 13, the California State Athletic Commission declared that it had officially changed the decision to a no-contest and that Hopkins retained the title.

== Undercard ==
Confirmed bouts:

- Lightweight Championship bout: (Venezuela) Jorge Linares vs. (Mexico) Antonio DeMarco

DeMarco defeated Linares via Technical Knockout at 2:32 of the eleventh round.

- Light Welterweight bout: (United States) Danny Garcia vs. (United States) Kendall Holt

Garcia defeated Holt via Split Decision. (117-111, 115-113, 117-111)

- Welterweight bout: (United States) Paulie Malignaggi vs. (Mexico) Orlando Lora

Malignaggi defeated Lora via Unanimous Decision. (100-90, 98-92, 99-91)

=== Preliminary card ===
- Light Middleweight bout: (United States) Luis Collazo vs. (Mexico) Freddy Hernandez

Hernandez defeated Collazo via Unanimous Decision. (93-96, 93-96, 93-96)

- Welterweight bout: (United States) Nick Casal vs. (United States) Michael Anderson

Casal defeated Anderson via Technical Knockout at 2:51 of the third round.

- Middleweight bout: (United States) Donyil Livingston vs. (United States) Kurtiss Colvin

Livingston defeated Colvin via Unanimous Decision. (59-55, 58-56, 58-56)

- Cruiserweight bout: (United States) Dewey Bozella vs. (United States) Larry Hopkins

Bozella defeated Hopkins via Unanimous Decision. (38-37, 39-36, 39-36)

- Super Bantamweight bout: (United States) Manuel Avila vs. (United States) David Reyes

Avila defeated Reyes via Split Decision. (38-37, 39-36, 38-37)

=== Summary ===
The non-televised portion of the undercard was noted for featuring Dewey Bozella, who was fighting his first bout at the age of 52 after being incarcerated for a crime he did not commit for twenty-six years. Bozella, fighting at cruiserweight, defeated his opponent Larry Hopkins by unanimous decision in a four-round bout. Bozella will not fight again.

Former welterweight champion Luis Collazo also fought on the non-televised undercard against junior middleweight contender Freddy Hernandez, who defeated him by unanimous decision.

The three televised undercard bouts featured two former junior welterweight champions and a lightweight championship fight. In the first bout, fought at welterweight, Paulie Malignaggi defeated Orlando Lora in a lopsided ten-round decision. In the second fight, a twelve-rounder for the NABO junior welterweight championship and an elimination bout for the IBF title, undefeated Danny Garcia handed former WBO champion Kendall Holt his third loss in five fights by defeating him via split decision. In the second-to-last match of the evening, Antonio DeMarco defeated Jorge Linares to take his WBC lightweight championship.

=== Reported fight earnings ===
- Bernard Hopkins $1,000,000 vs. Chad Dawson $800,000
- Jorge Linares $100,000 vs. Antonio DeMarco $50,000
- Danny Garcia $75,000 vs. Kendall Holt $31,000
- Paul Malignaggi $75,000 vs. Orlando Lora $7,500
- Dewey Bozella $1,250 vs. Larry Hopkins $2,500

== International broadcasting ==
Country / Region	Broadcaster
Albania	SuperSport Albania
Argentina	TyC Sports
Australia	Main Event
Belgium	Be Sport 1
Czech Republic	Sport 1
Denmark	TV 2 Sport
France	Canal+ Sport
Hungary	Sport 1
Germany	Eurosport
Iceland	Stöð 2 Sport
Italy	Sportitalia
Japan	WOWOW
Malaysia	Astro SuperSport
Mexico	Televisa
New Zealand	Sky
Norway	Viasat Sport
Philippines	Solar Sports/TV5/IBC-13
Poland	Polsat Sport
Portugal	Sport TV
Qatar	Al Jazeera Sports
Romania	Sport.ro
Russia	NTV Plus
Slovakia	Sport 1
Spain	Digital+
Sweden	TV10
South Africa	SuperSport
United Kingdom	Primetime / BoxNation
United States	HBO PPV
Venezuela	Meridiano

Preceded by vs. Jean Pascal II	Bernard Hopkins' bouts 15 October 2011	Succeeded by Rematch
Preceded by vs. Adrian Diaconu	Chad Dawson's bouts 15 October 2011	Succeeded by Rematch
