= Dewey Bozella =

American boxer wrongly imprisoned for 26 years (born 1959)

- Born: 1959 (age 66–67); United States
- Known for: Served 26 years in prison for murder, conviction overturned after being proved innocent
- Awards: 2011 Arthur Ashe Courage Award

Dewey Bozella (born 1959) is a former professional boxer who is known for being wrongfully imprisoned. Convicted in 1983 for the murder of an elderly woman, Bozella served 26 years in prison before his conviction was overturned in 2009 after being proved innocent.

== Youth ==
Bozella was nine when his father beat his pregnant mother so badly that she later died. He was a witness to the beating. His father ran away and never returned. One of his brothers was stabbed to death, another was shot and killed, and a third died of AIDS. As a teenager, Bozella trained for a time with former two-time world Heavyweight champion boxer Floyd Patterson. At 20, Bozella was sentenced to nearly three years in prison for attempted robbery. He earned a bachelor's degree from Mercy College and a master's from New York Theological Seminary.

== Alleged offense and wrongful conviction ==
In 1977, 92-year-old Emma Crapser was murdered in her Poughkeepsie, New York apartment. Police alleged that Crapser walked in on a burglary that was being committed by a then 18-year-old Bozella, who then killed her. In 1983, Bozella was convicted of murder and sentenced to 20 years to life in prison. He continued to claim he was innocent and refused to admit to the crimes he was alleged to have committed, even when in front of the parole board, who denied him parole on four occasions. Bozella contacted the Innocence Project, who agreed to examine his case. When the Innocence Project discovered that there was no DNA evidence remaining to be tested, they referred the case to WilmerHale. Lawyers at WilmerHale discovered new evidence that had been suppressed by prosecutors showing Bozella was in fact innocent and had been framed. Supreme Court Justice James Rooney of Putnam County, New York agreed that the Dutchess County District Attorney, John King, had failed to disclose crucial evidence which would have proved Bozella's innocence. On October 28, 2009, Bozella was finally released from prison after serving 26 years.

=== Prison life ===
Bozella was imprisoned in New York State, including at Sing Sing Correctional Facility in Ossining, New York. While incarcerated at Sing Sing, he became the prison's light heavyweight boxing champion.

== Life after prison ==
On October 28, 2009, after being released from custody, Bozella began working with youths at a local gym in Newburgh, New York. At the gym, which is now closed, he worked with teenagers teaching them about boxing and about the dangers of joining gangs. He frequently visits various organizations to deliver speeches about his life experiences. Bozella is a frequent sight at New York City area boxing cards.

Bozella currently lives in Fishkill, New York with his wife, Trena. While accepting an award in 2011, he told an ESPN reporter that he still dreamed of having at least one professional fight one day. In 2011, boxing champion Bernard Hopkins helped Bozella's dream come true.

=== 2011 ESPY Awards ===
On July 13, 2011, Bozella's life was chronicled in ESPN's annual ESPY Award show in the Nokia Theatre at L.A. Live in Los Angeles, where he was honored as the recipient of the Arthur Ashe Courage Award.

=== Professional debut ===
On October 15, 2011, at the age of 52 years, Bozella won his professional boxing debut on the undercard of the Bernard Hopkins vs Chad Dawson match-up at Staples Center in Los Angeles, California, against Larry Hopkins by a 4-round unanimous decision. Bozella had been training with Bernard Hopkins in Philadelphia. President Barack Obama telephoned Bozella to wish him luck in the upcoming fight.

=== Appearances ===
In 2012, Bozella was a guest at the Ring 10 Veteran's Boxing Foundation 2nd Annual Fundraiser where he credited boxing and the champions with whom he shared the dais for saving his life.

=== Memoir ===
In 2016, Bozella published his memoir, Stand Tall: Fighting For My Life, Inside and Outside the Ring.

== Professional boxing record ==
1 Wins (0 knockouts), 0 Losses, 0 Draws, 0 No Contest
Res.	Record	Opponent	Type	Rd., Time	Date	Location	Notes
Win	1-0	(United States) Larry Hopkins	UD	4 (4)	2011-10-15	(United States) Staples Center, Los Angeles, California	Bozella's professional debut.

== See also ==
- Rubin "Hurricane" Carter, a boxer who served 18 years for murder before his conviction was set aside in 1985
- Innocent prisoner's dilemma
- List of wrongful convictions in the United States
