= Bernard Hopkins vs. Chad Dawson II =

Boxing competition

Once and For All
- Date: April 28, 2012
- Venue: Boardwalk Hall, Atlantic City, New Jersey, U.S.
- Title(s) on the line: WBC and The Ring light heavyweight titles

Tale of the tape
Boxer	Bernard Hopkins	Chad Dawson
Nickname	The Executioner	Bad
Hometown	Philadelphia, Pennsylvania, U.S.	New Haven, Connecticut, U.S.
Pre-fight record	52–5–2 (2) (32 KO)	30–1 (2) (17 KO)
Age	47 years, 3 months	29 years, 9 months
Height	6 ft 1 in (185 cm)	6 ft 1 in (185 cm)
Weight	174 lb (79 kg)	175 lb (79 kg)
Style	Orthodox	Southpaw
Recognition	WBC and The Ring; Light Heavyweight Champion; 2-division world champion	WBC; No. 1 Ranked Light Heavyweight; The Ring; No. 2 Ranked Light Heavyweight

Result
- Dawson wins via majority decision (117–111, 117–111, 114–114)

Bernard Hopkins vs. Chad Dawson II, billed as Once and For All, was a professional boxing match contested on April 28, 2012, for the WBC and The Ring light heavyweight titles.

== Background ==
The match was a rematch of their first controversial fight from a year earlier in Los Angeles, California, United States, which ended when Hopkins was unable to continue due to a dislocated shoulder suffered when Dawson lifted Hopkins off the ground with his own shoulder, causing Hopkins to fall to the canvas after a clinch. The fight was originally ruled as a technical knockout victory for Dawson in the second round, but was later changed to a no contest by the California State Athletic Commission and a technical draw by the World Boxing Council.

The rematch took place at Boardwalk Hall in Atlantic City, New Jersey, USA, and was televised on HBO as part of its World Championship Boxing series. The rematch was contested for Hopkins' WBC and The Ring light heavyweight championships, both of which were returned to him after the reversed decision.

Since neither fighter was able to garner a decision in the previous fight, they entered the contest with the same records they had when they fought the first time. Hopkins' record stood at 52-5-2-1, and counting the first fight he had not lost in his last six fights dating back to his 2008 defeat at the hands of Joe Calzaghe, which cost him The Ring light heavyweight championship he had won from Antonio Tarver. Dawson entered the fight having only been defeated one time, when Jean Pascal beat him for his WBC and International Boxing Organization titles in Montreal, Quebec, Canada in 2010. Hopkins entered the bout as a 7 to 2 underdog.

Eddie Cotton was the referee for the fight, with Dick Flaherty, Luis Rivera, and Steve Weisfeld as judges.

== The fight ==
In the fourth round of the fight, Hopkins hit the challenger with an accidental headbutt which caused Dawson to begin to bleed from his eye. Later on in that round Dawson again tried to lift Hopkins off the canvas as he had in the previous fight but was unsuccessful.

Although Hopkins continued to inflict damage to Dawson's face, Dawson kept hitting Hopkins and won a majority of the rounds. Hopkins went for a knockout victory which he needed later in the fight, but Dawson held him off and lasted the full twelve rounds. Dawson won a majority decision victory. Flaherty and Weisfeld both saw him as a 117–111 winner while Rivera scored the fight even at 114–114.

HBO's unofficial scorer Harold Lederman scored it 117–111 as did The Guardian, while ESPN's Dan Rafael scored the bout 118–110 all in favor of Dawson.

== Aftermath ==
Hopkins was not pleased with the loss and stormed out of the ring afterward, saying "let the public judge for themselves" if he won. Dawson called Hopkins a dirty fighter and said that if you could go twelve rounds with him you could go twelve rounds with anyone.

Dawson was linked to a unification bout with WBO champion Nathan Cleverly.

== Undercard ==
Confirmed bouts:

The co-featured contest on the HBO card featured a heavyweight bout between Seth Mitchell and Chazz Witherspoon for the vacant NABO heavyweight championship, which was won by Mitchell via a third-round technical knockout.

== Broadcasting ==
Country	Broadcaster
Australia	Main Event
Hungary	Sport 1
Poland	Polsat Sport
United Kingdom	BoxNation
United States	HBO

Preceded by First bout	Bernard Hopkins's bouts 28 April 2012	Succeeded by vs. Tavoris Cloud
Preceded by First bout	Chad Dawson's bouts 28 April 2012	Succeeded by vs. Andre Ward
