= Jean Pascal vs. Bernard Hopkins =

Boxing competition

Dynasty
- Date: December 18, 2010
- Venue: Colisée de Québec, Quebec City, Quebec, Canada
- Title(s) on the line: WBC, IBO, and The Ring light heavyweight titles

Tale of the tape
Boxer	Jean Pascal	Bernard Hopkins
Nickname		"The Executioner"
Hometown	Laval, Quebec, Canada	Philadelphia, Pennsylvania, U.S.
Pre-fight record	26–1 (16 KO)	51–5–1 (1) (32 KO)
Age	28 years, 1 month	45 years, 11 months
Height	5 ft 11 in (180 cm)	6 ft 1 in (185 cm)
Weight	174 1/4 lb (79 kg)	174 1/2 lb (79 kg)
Style	Orthodox	Orthodox
Recognition	WBC, IBO and The Ring; Light Heavyweight Champion	The Ring; No. 4 Ranked Light Heavyweight; 2-division world champion

Result
- Majority draw

Jean Pascal vs. Bernard Hopkins, billed as Dynasty, was a professional boxing match contested on December 18, 2010, for the WBC, IBO, and The Ring Light Heavyweight championship. The bout was held on December 18, 2010, at Colisée Pepsi, Quebec City, Quebec, Canada and was televised on Showtime.

== Background ==
Following Pascal's upset victory over Chad Dawson, 45-year-old former champion Bernard Hopkins was soon named his next opponent. Within the first 48 hours of tickets being on sale for Pascal/Hopkins, more than 15,000 tickets were sold. In preparation for the fight, Pascal spent forty days training in Miami.

Hopkins was looking to surpass George Foreman as the oldest boxing champion in history.

== The fight ==
The fight started at a good pace, with both fighters getting combinations and landing good shots. Hopkins was knocked down in the 1st round, and again in the 3rd. He complained that it was a blow to the back of the head that caused him to go down in the final seconds of the 1st, but the Montreal ref, Michael Griffin, scored it a knockdown. The knockdown was clearer in the 3rd, when Pascal tagged B-Hop with a left. Hopkins dropped to the canvas and got up with no problem. Pascal began to wear down and Hopkins picked up the pace, knowing he was down on the scorecards. The Canadian boxer was the younger and quicker but was not able to do much and was not that active. He was hit repeatedly in the final six rounds.

Hopkins launched a desperate flurry in the final round but failed to put Pascal down. "The 12th round was vicious," Hopkins said. "He looked to be tired from the sixth round. He was gasping. He held every time I got close. And I just kept coming forward throwing punches. He was holding on for dear life."

The fight went the full 12 rounds, judge Steve Morrow scored it 114–112 for Hopkins, while Claude Paquette and Daniel Van de Wiele both scored it even (113–113, 114–114 respectively) resulting in a majority draw with Pascal retaining his titles.

== Aftermath ==
There was some early debate over whether the Canadian and Belgian judges' cards had been altered, but that notion was discarded by both camps. Hopkins reluctantly accepted a draw on Pascal's turf, even if he felt he won—and insists he would if they fought again. Hopkins said he wants a rematch, but not in Canada.

"Look at my record -- anyone I fought twice I destroyed," he said.

Eventually, the rematch happened 5 months later in May 21, taking place in Bell Centre. In a closely contested bout, Hopkins would emerge victorious via unanimous decision on all 3 scorecards (116-112, 115-114, 115-113), and surpasses George Foreman as the oldest boxer to win a championship at 46 years and 126 days old.

== Undercard ==
Confirmed bouts:

=== Televised ===
- Welterweight bout: (United States) Paul Malignaggi vs. (Mexico) Michael Lozada
  - Malignaggi defeats Lozada via TKO at 2:33 of round 6.
- Middleweight bout: (United States) Peter Quillin vs. (Canada) Martin Desjardins
  - Quillin defeats Desjardins via KO at 2:53 of round 1.
- Super Middleweight bout: (United States) Daniel Jacobs vs. (United States) Jesse Orta
  - Jacobs defeats Orta via TKO at round 5.

=== Preliminary card ===
- Welterweight bout: (Canada) Kevin Bizier vs. (United States) Ronnie Warrior Jr
  - Bizier defeats Warrior via RTD at 3:00 of round 3.
- Lightweight bout: (Canada) Pier-Olivier Côté vs. (Mexico) Cesar Soriano
  - Cote defeats Soriano via TKO at 0:30 of round 1.
- Heavyweight bout: (United Kingdom) Tyson Fury vs. (United States) Zack Page
  - Fury defeats Page via unanimous decision.
- Heavyweight bout: (Canada) Eric Martel Bahoeli vs. (Puerto Rico) Ruben Rivera
  - Bahoeli defeats Rivera via unanimous decision.
- Light Middleweight bout: (Canada) Mikaël Zewski vs. (Peru) Leonardo Rojas
  - Zewski defeats Rojas via TKO at 2:59 of round 2.

== Broadcasting ==
Country	Broadcaster
Canada	Canal Indigo
Poland	Polsat
United States	Showtime

Preceded by vs. Chad Dawson	Jean Pascal's bouts 18 December 2010	Succeeded by Rematch
Preceded by vs. Roy Jones, Jr.	Bernard Hopkins's bouts 18 December 2010	Succeeded by Rematch
