= La Farrell Bunting =

American boxer

Lafarrell Deshun Bunting (born October 1, 1980, in Memphis, TN) is an American boxer.

== Professional career ==
Known as "Fabulous Fairway", Bunting began his professional career in 2001, and fought in the ShoBox Super Middleweight eliminator tournament, but lost to Anthony Hanshaw via TKO. In 2007 he lost a decision to contender Jean Pascal.

== The Contender ==
He was one of the featured boxers on the 3rd season of the boxing reality TV series, The Contender, The Contender (season 3), which premiered September 4, 2007 on ESPN.
