= George Blades (boxer) =

American boxer

Personal information
- Nickname: Honey Boy
- Born: August 27, 1974 (age 51) Orlando, Florida, U.S.
- Height: 5 ft 11 in (1.80 m)
- Weight: Light heavyweight; Cruiserweight

Boxing career

Boxing record
- Total fights: 30
- Wins: 23
- Win by KO: 16
- Losses: 7

George Blades (born August 27, 1974) is an American former professional boxer who competed from 1999 to 2014 and challenged for the WBO light heavyweight title in 2007.

== Professional career ==
On June 16, 2007, Blades fought Zsolt Erdei for the WBO light heavyweight title, but lost by eleventh-round technical knockout.

On September 28, 2013, Blades fought Jean Pascal, but lost by fifth-round technical knockout.

On June 21, 2014, Blades fought Chad Dawson, but lost by first-round knockout.

== Professional boxing record ==
| 30 fights | 23 wins | 7 losses |
|---|---|---|
| By knockout | 16 | 5 |
| By decision | 7 | 2 |

| No. | Result | Record | Opponent | Type | Round, time | Date | Location | Notes |
|---|---|---|---|---|---|---|---|---|
| 30 | Loss | 23–7 | Marcus Browne | KO | 1 (8), 1:25 | 11 Dec 2014 | Pechanga Resort and Casino, Temecula, California, U.S. | |
| 29 | Loss | 23–6 | Chad Dawson | KO | 1 (10), 2:35 | 21 Jun 2014 | StubHub Center, Carson, California, U.S. | |
| 28 | Loss | 23–5 | Jean Pascal | TKO | 5 (10), 2:54 | 28 Sep 2013 | Bell Centre, Montreal, Quebec, Canada | |
| 27 | Win | 23–4 | James Morrow | TKO | 7 (8), 2:18 | 16 Feb 2013 | Dupont Pavilion State Fairgrounds, Indianapolis, Indiana, U.S. | |
| 26 | Win | 22–4 | Shawn Kirk | UD | 6 | 5 Jun 2010 | National Guard Armory, Evansville, Indiana, U.S. | |
| 25 | Loss | 21–4 | Jose Luis Herrera | TKO | 3 (8), 1:18 | 23 Jan 2008 | Deauville Beach Resort, Miami Beach, Florida, U.S. | |
| 24 | Loss | 21–3 | Zsolt Erdei | TKO | 11 (12), 2:27 | 16 Jun 2007 | Syma Sport and Events Centre, Budapest, Hungary | For WBO light heavyweight title |
| 23 | Win | 21–2 | John Romans William | TKO | 7 (10), 0:53 | 19 Jan 2007 | Mallory Square, Key West, Florida, U.S. | Won vacant WBC Latino light heavyweight title |
| 22 | Win | 20–2 | Tyrone Jackson | UD | 6 | 10 Sep 2004 | Henry Fonda Theater, Hollywood, California, U.S. | |
| 21 | Win | 19–2 | Kevin Miller | TKO | 3 (8), 1:19 | 7 May 2004 | Farm Bureau Building, Indianapolis, Indiana, U.S. | Won vacant NABC cruiserweight title |
| 20 | Win | 18–2 | Paul Eakle | TKO | 2 (4), 1:32 | 25 Nov 2003 | Pepsi Coliseum, Indianapolis, Indiana, U.S. | |
| 19 | Win | 17–2 | Tyrone Muex | TKO | 3 (6), 1:53 | 26 Sep 2003 | Farm Bureau Building, Indianapolis, Indiana, U.S. | |
| 18 | Loss | 16–2 | Charles Tanner | MD | 10 | 29 Jul 2003 | Civic Center, Hammond, Indiana, U.S. | |
| 17 | Win | 16–1 | John Basil Jackson | UD | 4 | 8 May 2003 | Trap Nightclub, Nashville, Tennessee, U.S. | |
| 16 | Win | 15–1 | Michael Shanks | KO | 1 (4), 1:33 | 15 Feb 2003 | Zorah Shrine Temple, Terre Haute, Indiana, U.S. | |
| 15 | Loss | 14–1 | Nick Cook | UD | 8 | 20 Jul 2002 | Conseco Fieldhouse, Indianapolis, Indiana, U.S. | For USA Indiana State light heavyweight title |
| 14 | Win | 14–0 | John Basil Jackson | TKO | 4 (4), 0:50 | 1 Jun 2002 | Cumberland Place, West Lafayette, Indiana, U.S. | |
| 13 | Win | 13–0 | Donnie Penelton | UD | 6 | 21 May 2002 | 8 Second Saloon, Indianapolis, Indiana, U.S. | |
| 12 | Win | 12–0 | Conley Person | KO | 1 | 26 Apr 2000 | Horizon Theatre, Muncie, Indiana, U.S. | |
| 11 | Win | 11–0 | Tyrone Mack | KO | 3 (4), 1:35 | 19 Apr 2002 | Farm Bureau Building, Indianapolis, Indiana, U.S. | |
| 10 | Win | 10–0 | Curtis Reed | TKO | 5 (8) | 27 Jan 2001 | Johanning Civic Center, Kokomo, Indiana, U.S. | |
| 9 | Win | 9–0 | Gerald Armfield | TKO | 2 (8), 1:58 | 21 Nov 2000 | Pepsi Coliseum, Indianapolis, Indiana, U.S. | |
| 8 | Win | 8–0 | Barton Spears | TKO | 2 (4), 2:00 | 3 Oct 2000 | Farm Bureau Building, Indianapolis, Indiana, U.S. | |
| 7 | Win | 7–0 | Reggie Strickland | UD | 6 | 20 Jun 2000 | Farm Bureau Building, Indianapolis, Indiana, U.S. | |
| 6 | Win | 6–0 | Marcel Alexander | KO | 1 (4), 2:52 | 11 Apr 2000 | Farm Bureau Building, Indianapolis, Indiana, U.S. | |
| 5 | Win | 5–0 | Michael Shanks | TKO | 4 (4), 1:03 | 29 Feb 2000 | Pepsi Coliseum, Indianapolis, Indiana, U.S. | |
| 4 | Win | 4–0 | Brian Yates | UD | 4 | 23 Nov 1999 | Pepsi Coliseum, Indianapolis, Indiana, U.S. | |
| 3 | Win | 3–0 | Larry Hyatt | KO | 1 (4), 2:06 | 29 Oct 1999 | Farm Bureau Building, Indianapolis, Indiana, U.S. | |
| 2 | Win | 2–0 | John Moore | UD | 4 | 2 Oct 1999 | Aztar Casino, Evansville, Indiana, U.S. | |
| 1 | Win | 1–0 | Rick Enis | KO | 2 (4), 2:18 | 2 Sep 1999 | Adam's Mark Hotel, Indianapolis, Indiana, U.S. | |
