= Jean Pascal vs. Bernard Hopkins II =

Boxing competition

Dynasty II
- Date: May 21, 2011
- Venue: Bell Centre, Montreal, Quebec, Canada
- Title(s) on the line: WBC, IBO, and The Ring light heavyweight titles

Tale of the tape
Boxer	Jean Pascal	Bernard Hopkins
Nickname		"The Executioner"
Hometown	Laval, Quebec, Canada	Philadelphia, Pennsylvania, U.S.
Pre-fight record	26–1 (1) (16 KO)	51–5–2 (1) (32 KO)
Age	28 years, 6 months	46 years, 4 months
Height	5 ft 10 in (178 cm)	6 ft 1 in (185 cm)
Weight	174 3/4 lb (79 kg)	174 3/4 lb (79 kg)
Style	Orthodox	Orthodox
Recognition	WBC, IBO and The Ring; Light Heavyweight Champion	The Ring; No. 1 Ranked Light Heavyweight; 2-division world champion

Result
- Hopkins defeated Pascal via unanimous decision.

Jean Pascal vs. Bernard Hopkins II, billed as Dynasty II, was a professional boxing match contested on May 21, 2011, for the WBC, IBO, and The Ring light heavyweight championship.

== Background ==
Three weeks after they fought to a highly disputed draw, the WBC ordered a rematch between Jean Pascal and Bernard Hopkins, with the winner obligated to face Chad Dawson afterwards. When Pascal defeated Dawson by 11th-round technical decision in August 2010, Dawson had a rematch clause in his contract in the event of a loss which allowed both fighters to take interim bouts before the rematch was due. Dawson choose not take one but Pascal did, and fought Hopkins.

Despite claiming he didn't want a rematch in Canada, the bout was held at Bell Centre, Montreal, Quebec and was televised on HBO.

=== Referee and Judges ===
The referee for the fight was Brit Ian John-Lewis, and the judges were Philippines' Rey Danseco, Anek Hongtongkam of Thailand, and Italy's Guido Cavalleri.

== The fight ==
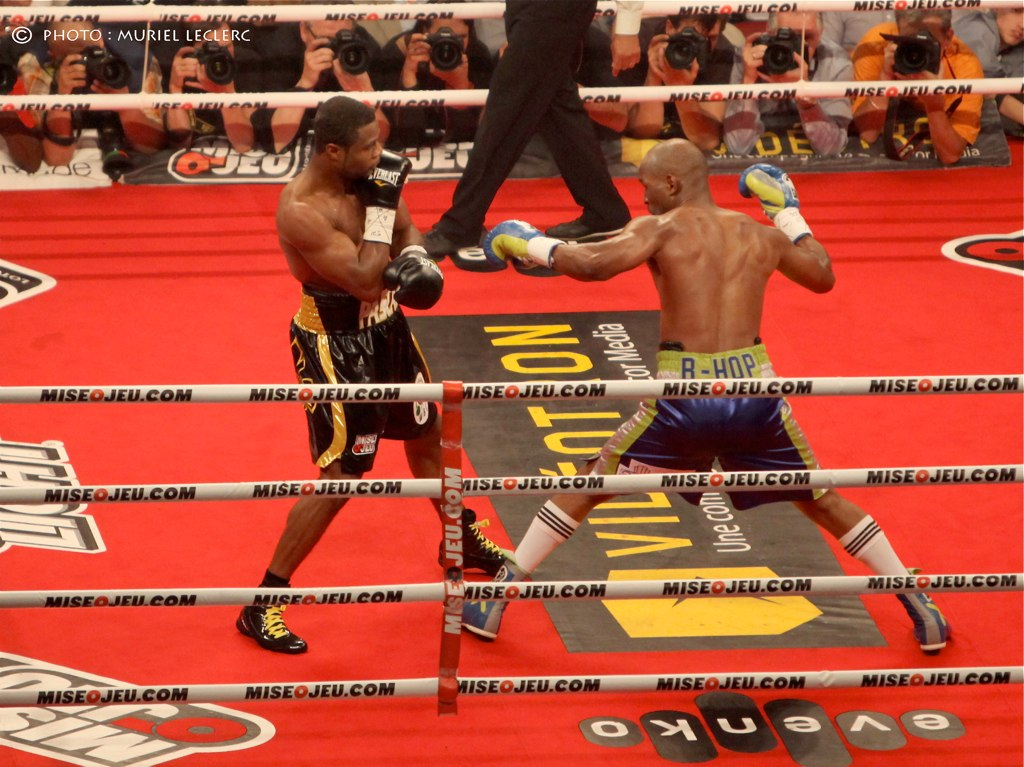
Pascal (left) vs. Hopkins, 2011

The bout began with both fighters feeling each other out for the first few rounds. In the third round, Hopkins began to find success with the right hand and shook the knees of Pascal. In the fourth round, both fighters exchanged power shots frantically with Hopkins looking slightly wobbled at the end of the round. Later on, before the seventh round began, Hopkins began doing push-ups in the ring. In the ninth round, Pascal's glove touched the mat after a cupping shot and was ruled a slip. This occurred again in the tenth. The fight again went the distance, with all three judges scoring the bout in favour of Hopkins, with scores of 116–112, 115–114 and 115–113. HBO's Harold Lederman had the bout scored 115–113 for Hopkins, while ESPN's Dan Rafael scored the bout a 114–114 draw.

This made Hopkins the oldest boxer in history to win a world title.

== Aftermath ==
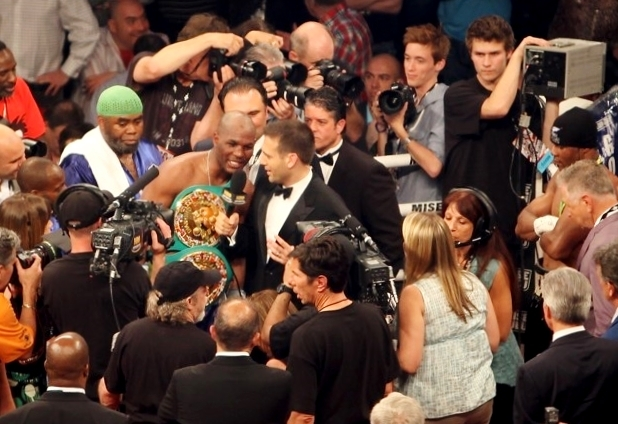
Bernard Hopkins with the WBC light heavyweight title during an interview.

With the victory, Hopkins not only won Pascal's WBC, IBO and The Ring Light Heavyweight titles, but also surpassed George Foreman for the oldest boxer to win a world title, at 46 years and 126 days old. After the announcement, Hopkins gave the WBC title back to a defeated Pascal, showing respect to his opponent amidst the pre-fight build-ups.

Following Chad Dawson's victory on the undercard of the fight, the deal was eventually set and he faced Hopkins in October, where Dawson was originally awarded the 2nd round TKO victory after lifting Hopkins up and landing on his shoulder, with the latter being injured in the process. The referee saw Hopkins unable to continue, calling the fight off. Eventually, the fight was ruled a no contest by the California State Athletic Commission on December 13, and Hopkins retained his titles.

After more than a year out of the ring, Pascal was slated to challenge Tavoris Cloud for the IBF light-heavyweight title on 11 August 2012, but a hand injury forced him to pull out of the fight. Pascal finally returned to the ring on 14 December 2012 against Aleksy Kuziemski.

== Undercard ==
Confirmed bouts:

=== Televised ===
- Light Heavyweight Championship (Canada) Jean Pascal vs. (United States) Bernard Hopkins
  - Hopkins defeated Pascal via unanimous decision. (115-113,116-112,115-114).
- Light Heavyweight bout: (United States) Chad Dawson vs. (Romania) Adrian Diaconu
  - Dawson defeated Diaconu via unanimous decision. (117-111, 118-110, 116-112).

=== Preliminary card ===
- Light Heavyweight bout: (Canada) Nicholson Poulard vs. (Mexico) Jaudiel Zepeda
  - Poulard defeated Zepeda via unanimous decision (100-90, 100-90, 100-90).
- Welterweight bout: (Canada) Kevin Bizier vs. (Mexico) Mauro Lucero
  - Bizier defeated Lucero via knockout at 3:00 in the fifth round.
- Cruiserweight bout: (Colombia) Eleider Alvarez vs. (Canada) David Whittom
  - Alvarez defeated Whittom via unanimous decision (40-36, 40-36, 40-36).
- Heavyweight bout: (Colombia) Oscar Rivas vs. (Hungary) Zsolt Zathureczky
  - Rivas defeated Zathureczky via technical knockout at 2:05 in the first round.
- Heavyweight bout: (Canada) Didier Bence vs. (Canada) Dwayne Storey
  - Bence defeated Storey via technical knockout at 1:38 in the second round.
- Light Middleweight bout: (Canada) Mikaël Zewski vs. (United States) Ruben Galvan
  - Zewski defeated Galvan via knockout at 1:44 in the third round.

== International broadcasting ==
Country	Broadcaster
Australia	Main Event
Canada	Viewers Choice
Canada	Canal Indigo
Hungary	Sport 2
Qatar	Al Jazeera Sports +8
Romania	Sport.ro
United States	HBO

Preceded by First bout	Jean Pascal's bouts 21 May 2011	Succeeded by vs. Aleksy Kuziemski
Preceded by First bout	Bernard Hopkins's bouts 21 May 2011	Succeeded by vs. Chad Dawson
