= Jean Pascal vs. Chad Dawson =

Boxing match

- Date: 14 August 2010
- Venue: Bell Centre, Montreal, Quebec, Canada
- Title(s) on the line: WBC, IBO and vacant The Ring light heavyweight titles

Tale of the tape
Boxer	Jean Pascal	Chad Dawson
Nickname		"Bad"
Hometown	Laval, Quebec, Canada	New Haven, Connecticut, U.S.
Purse	$1,050,000	
Pre-fight record	25–1 (16 KO)	29–0 (1) (17 KO)
Age	27 years, 9 months	28 years, 1 month
Height	5 ft 11 in (180 cm)	6 ft 1 in (185 cm)
Weight	174 1/4 lb (79 kg)	174 lb (79 kg)
Style	Orthodox	Southpaw
Recognition	WBC; Light Heavyweight Champion; The Ring; No. 2 Ranked Light Heavyweight	IBO and WBC "Interim"; Light Heavyweight Champion; The Ring; No. 1 Ranked Light Heavyweight; The Ring No. 6 ranked pound-for-pound fighter Former Light heavyweight champion

Result
- Pascal defeated Dawson by 11th round technical decision

Jean Pascal vs. Chad Dawson was a professional boxing match contested on 14 August 2010, for the WBC, IBO, and The Ring light heavyweight championship.

== Background ==
Since winning the WBC light heavyweight title against Adrian Diaconu, Jean Pascal had made two successful defences, in the second of which, a rematch with Diaconu had resulted in him requiring arthroscopic surgery for his right shoulder.

Unbeaten Dawson had previously held two versions of the Light heavyweight title, winning WBC against Tomasz Adamek in 2007, before vacating it to face IBF and IBO champion Antonio Tarver in October 2008, instead of facing his mandatory Diaconu. He defeated Tarver by unanimous decision to win the title and in the rematch before giving it up to have a rematch with Glen Johnson rather than face his mandatory challenger Tavoris Cloud. His victory made him the WBC interim titleholder.

In June 2010, Pascal re-signed a multi-million dollar contract with promoter Groupe Yvon Michel, the most lucrative ever given out to a boxer in Quebec boxing history. It stated that he was guaranteed $1,050,000 to defend his title against Chad Dawson, as well as another $1,500,000 guaranteed in the following fight. Pascal became the first Canadian boxer to receive more than a million dollars for a fight in Canada.

The champion Pascal was a 4–1 underdog.

== The fight ==
Pascal used movement and quick flurries to pick up round, with Dawson appearing unwilling to trade blows with the champion. Pascal staggered Dawson in the seventh round and appear to hurt him in the ninth. Dawson started the eleventh round strongly, as he backed up Pascal with a left upper cut prompting the champion to clinch to stop the attack. This caused an accidental clash of heads which opened up a gash over Dawson's right eye. The ringside doctor examined the gash and decided that Dawson could not continue. As a result, the bout went to the scorecards. Two judges scored the bout 106–103 and the other had it 108–101 all in favour of Pascal giving him a unanimous technical decision victory HBO's Harold Lederman had the bout scored 106–103 for Pascal.

== Aftermath ==
Speaking in the ring after the bout Pascal said "I knew with my speed in the ring I could beat Chad Dawson, I was not tired. I knew Chad was tired. I thought 'let him throw punches and I will get him at the end of the rounds'." Dawson claimed that he was repeatedly held and butted by Pascal, saying "We both fought a great fight, he was holding and head-butting me all night. I didn't complain, not one time." He also claimed that he would have stopped Pascal had the bout continued; "I was on the way to stopping him and he knew that, before they stopped the fight, I had him hurt. We had two more rounds to fight."

Despite having a rematch clause, Pascal was permitted another bout beforehand, with Lucian Bute, Bernard Hopkins, Joe Calzaghe and Nathan Cleverly either mentioned or seen as potential options.

== Undercard ==
Confirmed bouts:

== Broadcasting ==
Country	Broadcaster
Canada	Canal Indigo
Hungary	DigiSport
Poland	Polsat
United States	HBO

Preceded by vs. Adrian Diaconu II	Jean Pascal's bouts 14 August 2010	Succeeded by vs. Bernard Hopkins
Preceded by vs. Glen Johnson II	Chad Dawson's bouts 14 August 2010	Succeeded by vs. Adrian Diaconu
