= Jean Pascal =

Haitian-Canadian boxer

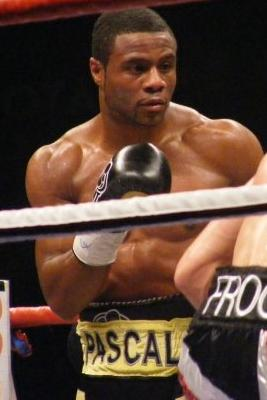
- Pascal vs. Froch, 2008

Personal information
- Nationality: Canadian
- Born: Jean-Thenistor Pascal; 28 October 1982 (age 44) Port-au-Prince, Haiti
- Height: 5 ft 10 1/2 in (179 cm)
- Weight: Super-middleweight; Light-heavyweight; Cruiserweight

Boxing career
- Reach: 72 in (183 cm)
- Stance: Orthodox

Boxing record
- Total fights: 45
- Wins: 37
- Win by KO: 21
- Losses: 9
- Draws: 1
- No contests: 1
Medal record
Men's amateur boxing
Representing Canada
Jeux de la Francophonie
Gold medal – first place	2001 Ottawa-Hull	Light-middleweight
Commonwealth Games
Gold medal – first place	2002 Manchester	Light-middleweight
Pan American Games
Bronze medal – third place	2003 Santo Domingo	Middleweight

Jean-Thenistor Pascal (born 28 October 1982) is a Haitian-born Canadian professional boxer. He held the WBA (Regular) light-heavyweight title from 2019 to 2021, and previously the WBC, IBO, Ring magazine and lineal light-heavyweight titles between 2009 and 2011, and challenged once for the WBC super-middleweight title in 2008.

== Early life and amateur career ==
Pascal was born in Port-au-Prince, Haiti. When Pascal was four, his mother (a nurse) and older brother (Nicholson Poulard) had left Haiti and settled in Laval, Quebec, just outside Montreal. His father, a well-respected politician, remained in Haiti. Pascal played hockey and soccer, but after watching his older brother become the Quebec Boxing Champion in 1996, Pascal, at 13 years of age, started to visit boxing gym "Club Champions St-Michel" once or twice every week. His first trainer was Sylvain Gagnon, who considered Pascal to be very talented. According to an interview from May 2005, Pascal's idol was Roy Jones Jr.

He represented Canada as a middleweight at the 2004 Olympics in Athens and won the gold medal at the Commonwealth Games in Manchester in 2002, against Paul Smith.

== Professional career ==
=== Super-middleweight ===
==== Early years ====
Pascal made his professional debut in February 2005. After nine wins, Pascal won the Canada National and Quebec boxing Council (CQB) super-middleweight titles in a national bout against Martin Desjardins, winning in round seven. After two more fights, Pascal won the TAB (Trans America Boxing) title against Darnell Boone. Pascal boxed Lucas Green Arias in September 2006 at the Montreal Casino for the vacant WBC Latino title. Pascal sent Arias to the canvas with a flurry of punches in the sixth round. Arias got up for the final second of the round, but moments later slid off the stool in his corner, vigorously rubbing his head. He was unable to get up for the seventh round, making Pascal the winner. He was given oxygen in the ring and then was taken to the hospital on a stretcher. It was revealed that he suffered a subdural hematoma.

On 18 November 2006, Pascal defeated Jermain Mackey by unanimous decision to win the NABO super-middleweight title. Pascal then defeated Lafarrell Bunteng by unanimous decision on 10 March 2007, defending the NABO belt.

Pascal defeated Christian Cruz by technical knockout in the tenth round to retain his NABO title and win the vacant NABA and NABF titles. This win solidified his reputation at the national level.

Pascal successfully defended the NABO/NABF/NABA super-middleweight titles with a ten-round unanimous decision over Brian Norman in December 2007.

==== Pascal vs. Froch ====
At 21–0, Pascal got his first world title shot when he was matched against British boxer Carl Froch for the vacant WBC super middleweight title on 6 December 2008 at the Trent FM Arena in Froch's hometown of Nottingham, England. Pascal held his own, with both men consistently tagging each other throughout the bout. However, Froch won a hard-fought, exciting contest which had many close rounds by a unanimous decision. The scorecards read 112–116, 111–117 and 110–118. Since the bout, Froch and Pascal have become friends on a personal level and have made a promise to face each other again in the future.

After the loss, Pascal fought Pablo Daniel Zamora Nievas on 4 April 2009 and won the fight by knockout in the fifth round to win the vacant WBO Inter-Continental super-middleweight title.

=== Light-heavyweight ===
Pascal then moved up in weight to the light-heavyweight division to challenge the WBC light-heavyweight champion Adrian Diaconu on 19 June 2009 at the Bell Centre in Montreal. Pascal won the bout and the title by a unanimous decision. About two months after the fight on 12 August 2009 the city of Laval honored Pascal.

Pascal defended his WBC light-heavyweight title for the first time on 25 September 2009 against the WBC's mandatory challenger, aged Italian veteran Silvio Branco, retaining his title with a tenth round stoppage.

Pascal's second title defense came on 11 December 2009 in a rematch against Adrian Diaconu. Just like the first fight against Diaconu, the fight ended in another win by decision. Throughout the fight Pascal seemed to be having problems with his right arm, starting around round five. However it did appear that his cutman, Russ Anber, was able to pop the shoulder back in before the start of round eleven. Five days after the fight on 16 December 2009 Pascal underwent arthroscopic surgery for his right shoulder. Doctors removed a bone chip and repaired the labrum in his shoulder.

In June 2010, Pascal re-signed a multi-million dollar contract with promoter Groupe Yvon Michel in which he was guaranteed $1,050,000 to defend his title against Chad Dawson, as well as another $1,500,000 guaranteed in the fight following Dawson, which happened to be Bernard Hopkins. The contract is the most lucrative ever given out to a boxer in Quebec boxing history. Pascal has become the first Canadian boxer to receive more than a million dollars for a fight in Canada.

==== Pascal vs. Dawson ====
For Pascal's third title defense, he fought Chad Dawson for Pascal's WBC light-heavyweight title, and the vacant Lineal & The Ring light-heavyweight titles. Pascal dominated the early action and worked well in the middle rounds but seemed to tire late and get frequently caught by the favored Dawson. Pascal won the fight by a technical decision part way through the eleventh round due to an accidental head butt that caused a major cut over Dawson's right eye and was stopped by the ring-side doctor. However Pascal easily won the fight according to the judges' scorecards with scores of 108–101 and 106–103.

==== Pascal vs. Hopkins I, II ====
Following Pascal's upset of Chad Dawson, 45-year-old Bernard Hopkins was soon named his next opponent for him to defend his WBC, Lineal, and The Ring light-heavyweight titles. Within the first 48 hours of tickets being on sale for Pascal/Hopkins, more than 15,000 tickets were sold. In preparation for the fight, Pascal spent forty days training in Miami.

The fight took place at the Colisée Pepsi in Quebec City on 18 December 2010. Pascal started strong in the fight, scoring two knockdowns in the first three rounds. One knockdown in the first round, which was disputed by Hopkins as an illegal blow to the back of the head and another knockdown in the third round. However, following the early rounds, the two fighters each held their own, only to have the fight end in a controversial majority draw.

At the end of 2010, The Ring magazine rated Pascal as the 14th best boxer in the world as part of their yearly Top One Hundred Boxers ranking. Pascal moved up fifty-one places on the list, compared to his 2009 ranking of 65. The jump in the rankings was directly attributed to Pascal's upset of Chad Dawson, since the list came out before Pascal fought Bernard Hopkins.

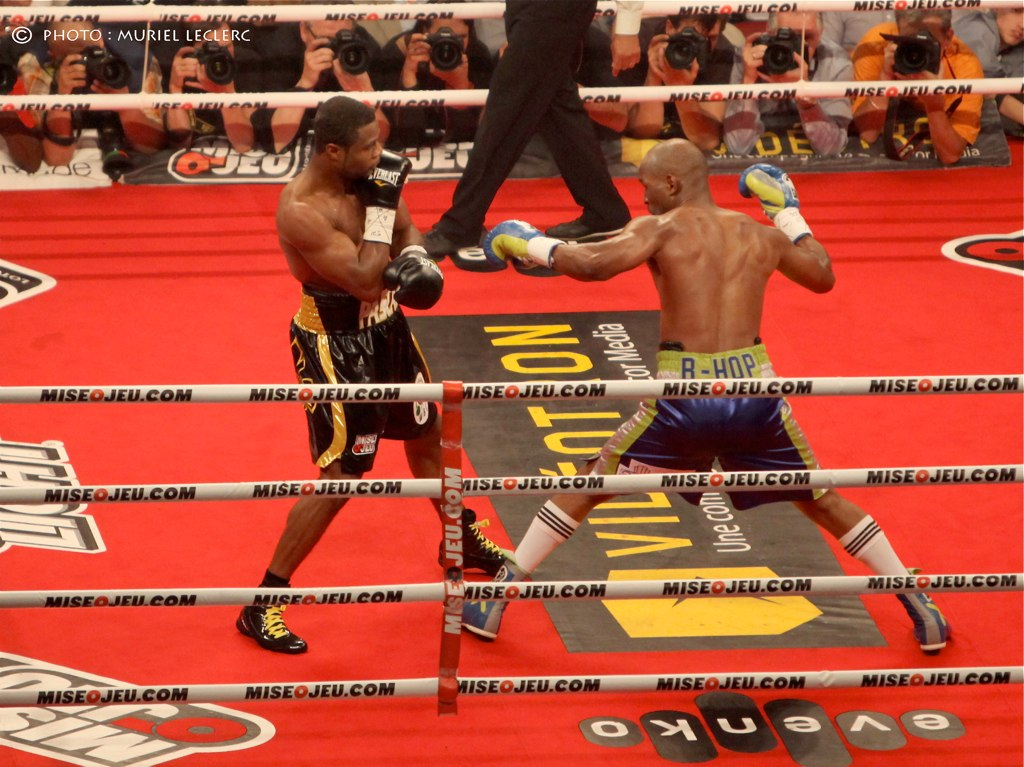
Pascal (left) vs. Hopkins, 2011

Following the controversial draw with Hopkins in December 2010, Hopkins expressed his frustration. Hopkins, who had refused to fight outside of the United States since 1994, felt there was a judging bias based on the fight being held in Quebec, Canada, as well as a discrimination of his age. Hopkins later criticized Pascal's performance, claiming that Pascal took more damage during the fight and that he clinched frequently. However, when Hopkins was asked about a potential rematch, he replaced most definitely only to claim that he was "too dangerous for anybody" and then went on to complain that GYM promotions was dragging the fight out to make him older so that he would lose.

Pascal defended his performance by noting the two knockdowns he scored early in the fight and defending the legitimacy of the judges. Pascal then expressed that he was unsatisfied with the decision and preferred to have won the fight rather than settle with a draw. When asked about a potential rematch he responded by saying: "If he wants a rematch, anytime."

The rematch with Bernard Hopkins was held on 21 May 2011 at the Bell Centre in Montreal, broadcast on HBO World Championship Boxing.

The bout began with both fighters feeling each other out for the first few rounds. In the third round, Hopkins began to find success with the right hand and shook the knees of Pascal. In the fourth round, both fighters exchanged power shots frantically with Hopkins looking slightly wobbled at the end of the round. Later on, before the seventh round began, Hopkins began doing push-ups in the ring. In the ninth round, Pascal's glove touched the mat after a cupping shot and was ruled a slip. This occurred again in the tenth. The fight concluded with the judges scoring the bout, 112–116, 114–115 and 113–115 in favor of Hopkins.

==== Pascal vs. Kuziemski, Bute ====
After many months under the radar, Pascal was slated to fight Tavoris Cloud for the IBF light-heavyweight title on 11 August 2012, but a hand injury forced him to pull out of the fight. Pascal finally returned to the ring on 14 December 2012 against Aleksy Kuziemski. He won the fight via wide unanimous decision, receiving the scores: 100–88, 98–88 and 98–90, from the fights' judges.

It was announced that Jean Pascal would be fighting Lucian Bute on 25 May 2013, at the Bell Centre in Montreal, Quebec for Bute's NABF light heavyweight title and the vacant WBC Diamond championship. The fight was rescheduled for 18 January 2014 due to an injury that required surgery to remove bone fragments from Bute's left hand. Pascal ended up winning the fight by unanimous decision.

==== Pascal vs. Kovalev I, Gonzalez ====
It was announced on 23 December 2014 that unified world champion Sergey Kovalev would defend his titles and fight Pascal on 14 March 2015 for the WBA, IBF and WBO world light heavyweight titles at the Bell Centre in Montreal, Quebec, Canada live on HBO. Kovalev had just been named Sports Illustrated's 2014 Fighter of the Year. Kovalev started the fight off aggressively as usual and took control of the fight earlier and eventually knocked Pascal down in the 3rd round. Pascal began to fight back and showed some signs of life in rounds 5 and 6, although Kovalev gained control of the fight again and began to hit Pascal with huge shots, wobbling him and in the 8th round the referee stopped the fight as he felt Pascal had taken too much punishment. Pascal felt the stoppage was unfair and demanded for a rematch. At the time of stoppage, Kovalev was leading 68–64 on all three judges' scorecards. CompuBox stats showed Kovalev landed 122 of 471 punches (26%) and Pascal connected on 68 of 200 (34%). The fight averaged 1.152 million viewers on HBO.

On 29 May, it was announced that Pascal would fight on the Kovalev vs. Mohammedi undercard at the Mandalay Bay Events Center in Nevada on 25 July against undefeated Cuban prospect Yunieski Gonzalez (16–0, 12 KOs). The fight was scheduled for 10 rounds. Gonzalez took the fight to Pascal in an entertaining affair that went the full 10 round distance. He was cheered on by the fans and HBO also praised his performance, as he was looking to make a statement in the light heavyweight division. Gonzalez looked to have outfought and out-landed Pascal, hurting him on a couple of occasions. The three judges' scored the fight an identical 96–94 in favour of Pascal. Many observers ringside had Gonzalez winning, some with a wide margin. HBO's unofficial scorekeeper Harold Lederman scored the fight 97-93 for Gonzalez. ESPN had the fight wider at 98-92 for Gonzalez. Gonzalez cried in the ring after losing the bout, feeling he had won. The win helped Pascal earn a rematch with Kovalev. CompuBox stats shows that Gonzalez landed 163 of 632 punches thrown (26%), while Pascal was the more accurate puncher landing 154 of his 397 thrown (39%).

==== Pascal vs. Kovalev II ====
On 5 December 2015 it was announced that the rematch between Kovalev and Pascal was set, to take place on 30 January 2016 at the Bell Centre in Montreal on HBO. Pascal was pumped for the rematch stating it would turn out differently to the first fight, "I put him down in the eighth round in the first fight, but [the referee] called it a slip. But I promise you that Kovalev is going to have a full plate in the rematch. I'm going to have a full plate as well, but I have a new trainer [Hall of Famer Freddie Roach]. I'm going to teach him respect and to respect Canadian boxing fans."

In front of 9,866, Kovalev dominated the fight, both outpunching and outlanding Pascal by wide margins. Kovalev won when Pascal's trainer Freddie Roach refused to let his fighter continue after the seventh round. At the time of stoppage, the scorecards read 70-62 three times, in favour of Kovalev. Round 5 was scored 10–8 on all three judges cards without there having been a knockdown. Kovalev landed 31 of 73 punches in round 5 alone. After the round, Roach threatened to pull Pascal. According to compubox stats, Kovalev landed 165 of 412 punches (40%) and Pascal landed 30 of 108 blows (28%).

==== Pascal vs. Ramallo ====
Pascal announced he would fight on 16 December 2016 against 33 year old journeyman Ricardo Marcelo Ramallo at the Cogeco Amphitheater in Trois-Rivières. Ramallo challenged for the vacant IBO International super middleweight title in 2015 in a losing attempt to Renold Quinlan. The fight took place at light heavyweight with Pascal weighing just over 181 pounds. Pascal stopped Ramallo in the 3rd round of their scheduled 10 round fight. In the opening rounds, Ramalo was connecting with his own shots from time to time, but did not have the same size, speed or the power of Pascal to do any further damage. Pascal knocked Ramallo down twice in the round 3 with the right hands to the head. Ramallo was hurt after the second knockdown. Although he seemed to have recovered, the referee stopped the fight rather than letting it go on.

==== Pascal vs. Álvarez ====
On 15 April 2017 it was announced that Pascal could fight Colombian Eleider Álvarez (22–0, 11 KOs) for the WBC Silver light heavyweight title on the undercard of Stevenson's world title defense against Fonfara at the Centre Bell in Montreal, Quebec, Canada on 3 June 2017. Álvarez was due to fight Stevenson next for the WBC world title, but took money to step aside. The event was scheduled to be shown live on Showtime and was confirmed on 21 April. Álvarez outboxed Pascal, winning a majority decision after 12 rounds. One judge scored the fight 114–114, whilst the other two scored it 117–111 and 116–112 in favour of Álvarez. Pascal suffered his third defeat in five fights. Álvarez controlled the fight with his superior jab, accuracy and general ring work. Pascal felt he had done enough to get the win and wanted a rematch with Álvarez.

==== Pascal vs. Elbiali ====
On 30 October 2017 Warriors Boxing Promotions announced a Friday night boxing card presented by Premier Boxing Champions would take place 8 December at the Hialeah Park in Miami, Florida. It was confirmed that Pascal would main event the card against Egyptian contender Ahmed Elbiali (16–0, 13 KOs), with former world champion Chad Dawson appearing as chief support, however he pulled out of his fight. Pascal told Ringtv it would be his final fight. Pascal retired with a stoppage win in round 6. Elbiali had begun to fade and looked exhausted by round 6. Pascal landed a flurry of shots trapping Elbiali against the ropes. Referee Telis Assimenios then intervened after the towel was thrown in. The time of stoppage was 2 minutes and 6 seconds of the sixth round.

=== Cruiserweight ===
==== Pascal vs. Bossé ====
The Montreal Journal and TVA Sports reported on 7 May 2018 that Pascal, despite announcing his retirement in 2017, would return to the ring on the Adonis Stevenson vs. Badou Jack undercard on 19 May in Toronto. His trainer Stephan Larouche later confirmed Pascal would fight again on 29 June. On 9 May, it was announced that Pascal would fight 36 year old former mixed martial arts fighter and hockey enforcer Steve Bossé on 29 June 2018. The fight was postponed to take place on 20 July. Pascal weighed 193 pounds for the fight. In front of around 3,300 fans, Pascal dominated and stopped Bossé in round 8 of their scheduled 10 round bout. The win meant for the first time in 12 years, dating back to 2006 that Pascal recorded back-to-back stoppage wins. Bossé tried to apply pressure on Pascal but was dropped once in round 3. Pascal continued to land heavy shots eventually dropping Bosse down a second time in round 8. The referee decided to stop the fight. It was reported that Bossé had suffered an injury during training on his right bicep and also suffered a broken jaw during the fight. Pascal stated he would continue boxing as he had "other goals to achieve", however did not state if he would continue to fight at cruiserweight or drop back down to light heavyweight.

=== Return to light-heavyweight ===
==== Pascal vs. Bivol ====
On 23 September, Groupe Yvon Michel announced that he had reached a deal for Pascal to fight Canadian cruiserweight champion Gary Kopas (10–11–2, 5 KOs) in Sydney, Nova Scotia on 9 November 2018 in a 12-round bout. The fight with Kopas was cancelled in early October after Sainvoyis Pascal, Jean's father, suffered a heart attack and died. Pascal needed time to attend the funeral. On 16 October, it was reported that Pascal was on the verge of returning to light heavyweight to challenge WBA champion Dmitry Bivol (14–0, 11 KOs) at the Etess Arena in Atlantic City on 24 November 2018. Bivol was initially in talks to make a defence against Joe Smith Jr., however Smith accepted a fight against IBF champion Artur Beterbiev in December instead. Later that same day, the fight was confirmed and would be televised by HBO.

Pascal lost by wide unanimous decision. Bivol’s right hook was established early in the fight, repeatedly hitting Pascal and knocking him off balance. Bivol saw this taking a toll on Pascal and became even more aggressive, landing body shots and leaving Pascal attempting to defend and not throw back. The home-crowd tried to cheer on Pascal. He had a good fourth round, but Bivol quickly reasserted his dominance. The judges scored the bout 119–109, 119–109, 117–111 in favor of Bivol. This was HBO's final event of the "World Championship Boxing" series, as they announced their exit from boxing. A crowd of 3,853 attended the event. CompuBox showed just how diminant Bivol was in landing 217 of 678 punches thrown (32%), and Pascal landed only 60 of 357 his thrown (17%). When asked who he would like to fight next, Bivol replied, "Doesn't matter to me. I'll fight anybody. I am ready to fight against Alvarez or Kovalev or Badou Jack. I'm ready. Let's make the fight." Pascal rated Bivol as the best in the division. According to Bivol, Pascal's power carried throughout the 12 rounds. Bivol was aware of this after the two sparred in 2016. The fight peaked 537,000 viewers and averaged 467,000 for HBO's final boxing telecast.

==== Pascal vs. Browne ====
On May 3, 2019, PBC announced that Showtime would televise a doubleheader from NRG Arena in Houston. The card was scheduled to take place on June 29, with Jermall Charlo vs. Brandon Adams as the main event. It was rumoured that Pascal would challenge WBA interim light heavyweight champion Marcus Browne (23–0, 16 KOs), who was coming off a career-best win over Badou Jack in January. A few weeks later, the Pascal-Browne bout was moved to the Barclays Center in Brooklyn on the undercard of Adam Kownacki vs. Chris Arreola, with the event now being televised by FOX. On June 6, a press release announced the card, making it official. Browne was arrested on June 12 for 'allegedly violating an order of protection' against his ex-girlfriend and their daughter. The said incident took place on May 22 after he barged into her home after dropping off their daughter. An argument broke out. It was said that this was the fourth time in the past 18 months where Browne had been in trouble, all involving the same woman. The arrest did not affect the fight with Pascal. Pascal did not underestimate Browne heading into the fight. He believed he was a rookie, but also hungry. He claimed they both knew each others styles very well. Pascal was going to rely on his experience to win the fight. At the kick off presser, Browne warned, "Don't blink, I'm knocking his ass out.", suggesting he was going for a stoppage win. Pascal laughed off his statement. Tensions rose during fight week. Pascal shoved Browne and then brought up his recent arrest. From a plastic bag, Pascal pulled out a wig and asked if Browne would still knock him out. Browne did not get up from his seat as Pascal shouted “You, woman-beater,” into his microphone. Browne weighed in 173½ pounds and Pascal was slightly heavier at 174½ pounds.

Browne was a heavy favourite going into the fight and although Browne won the majority of the rounds, Pascal knocked him down a total of three times in the fight, once in the fourth round and twice in the seventh round. This gave Pascal a lead of 75–74 on all three judges' scorecards at the time of the stoppage in the middle of the eighth round, when the fight was halted due to a clash of heads. As a result, Pascal emerged victorious via unanimous technical decision, and became the new WBA interim champion. All three knockdowns came from a right hand, but Browne outboxed Pascal for the majority of the fight. The cut which caused the premature stoppage of the fight was over Browne’s left eye. Speaking to FOX reporters after the fight, Pascal said, “Boxing is boxing. We clashed heads. But at the end of the day, I was winning the round. I dropped him three times. It was a close fight, but I believe I was winning.” The event drew 8,790 fans in attendance. According to Compubox, Browne landed 106 of 276 punches thrown (38%) and Pascal landed only 51 of his 264 thrown (19%). Browne did not stay for the post-fight interviews and made his way to NYU Lutheran Medical Center.

Unsure on how long it would take Browne to heal from the cut, Pascal's manager Greg Leon stated talks would be held with Browne's team for a potential rematch, as it was expected that Browne would activate the rematch clause. A preference was for the rematch to take place in Quebec, where Pascal was a well-known ticket seller. Although recent crowds drawn in Miami and Brooklyn meant there was other options. Pascal planned to take another fight before the year end, possibly a stay-busy whilst waiting for Browne to make a recovery. Pascal was back in the fold on the light heavyweight division.

==== Pascal vs. Jack ====
On October 25, 2019 it was announced that Pascal would defend his WBA (Regular) title against former two-division world champion Badou Jack on December 28 at State Farm Arena in Atlanta on the undercard of Gervonta Davis vs. Yuriorkis Gamboa. Jack was ranked #6 by the WBC and #11 by the WBA at light heavyweight. The card was televised on Showtime. The card marked the first time since 1998, in which a world title was contested in Atlanta. Pascal was ready to put on another performance in the US, but admitted Jack was a tough opponent. Both weighed 174½ pounds for the contest.

In what was a competitive, hard-fought fight, Pascal had the better start, winning the majority of the opening rounds and scoring a knockdown with a right hook in the fourth round. However, Jack found his way back into the fight, using his jab and body punches to render damage to his opponent and win rounds. In the final round, Jack returned the favor and dropped Pascal to the canvas with an overhand right and a flurry of right hooks. Despite Jack's success in the later stages of the fight, Pascal was deemed the winner by somewhat controversial split decision, with scores of 114–112, 114–112 in favor of Pascal, and 114–112 in favor of Jack. After five rounds, Pascal was ahead 50-44 on all three cards. According to CompuBox, Pascal landed 155 of 556 punches thrown (28%) while Jack landed 244 of 632 punches thrown (39%). Pascal acknowledged the fight was close, but adamant he did enough to win and claimed there was no robbery. As per the split decision outcome, Jack felt he did enough to win and asked Pascal if he would give him a rematch, to which Pascal replied, "Anytime." The event was attended by 14,129 fans, a near sell-out.

Mayweather Promotions' CEO Leonard Ellerbe spoke to reporters after the fight. He said. “We just can’t seem to catch a break. I feel bad, each and every fight he comes out there, he gives it his all. He’s come up short a few times.” The comment was in regards to many close world title decisions not going in Jack's favor.

==== Cancelled Badou Jack rematch ====
A rematch between Pascal and Badou Jack was signed and confirmed on February 13, 2020 to take place on FOX or Showtime, likely in May 2020. The rematch was put on hold due to the COVID-19 pandemic. Ellerbe stated Jack's first priority was to take the rematch with Pascal, but Pascal wanted to wait until fans are allowed to attend. Jack took stay busy fight on Triller Pay-Per-View, on the undercard of Mike Tyson vs. Roy Jones Jr. exhibition in November 2020. Jack won a lop-sided 8-round decision against Blake McKernan.

In April 2021, the rematch against announced to take place on the undercard of Floyd Mayweather Jr. vs. Logan Paul on 6 June 2021 on Showtime PPV at the Hard Rock Stadium in Miami Gardens, Florida. The fight was cancelled when it emerged on 28 May that Pascal had failed random Voluntary Anti-Doping Association-administered tests and had tested positive for three different banned PEDs: drostanolone, drostanolone metabolite and epitrenbolone. Jack posted on his twitter the fight was off, making a statement that his team believed Pascal was 'dirty' for the first bout. Jack's place on the card remained, now looking for a new opponent. Pascal responded to the news, saying that he was "shocked and embarrassed". He also stated this was an isolated incident. Undefeated Venezuelan Dervin Colina (15–0, 13 KOs) stepped in to fight Jack. On 3 June, reports surfaced that Pascal had failed yet another drugs test, testing positive for a fourth banned substance, erythropoietin, also known as EPO. Jack said to reporters on the fourth failed test, “It just proves he’s a piece of sh-t, and he should be banned for life, in my opinion.” Jack was hoping for the first fight to be changed to a 'no-contest'.

On July 10, the WBA removed Pascal as their "regular" champion and suspended him for six months. Ten days later, Pascal and veteran trainer Stéphan Larouche parted ways after working together since 2016. It was also reported after testing positive, he let go of his strength and conditioning coach. Pascal spoke positively towards his relationship with Larouch. He said, “Stephan is one of the best coaches I have worked with and I have no doubt that he will remain a staple in Quebec boxing for many years to come.”

==== Pascal vs. Fanlong ====
On March 8, 2022 it was reported that 34 year old Chinese boxer Meng Fanlong (17–0, 10 KOs) had turned down a catchweight fight against former world champion Sergey Kovalev in order to fight Pascal on May 20 in Plant City, Florida, promoted Probox, for their inaugural event. Fanlong agreed a 188 pound catchweight fight with Kovalev, which would have taken place on May 14 on Triller TV, however pulled out as the fight was never announced. Fanlong was ranked #1 with the IBF. The fight was made official on April 20. The promoters advised that there was PED testing for the fight, however later confirmed not administered by VADA. Head trainer Shaun George stated his boxer Fanlong chose to fight Pascal due to his name and wanted a big name on his record. Speaking on Pascal's previous failed tests, George said, “He’s a cheat. He’s a straight-up cheater. No matter what they say about they don’t know what happened, it was four different substances in his system ... He got caught and now he’s trying to save face.” At the time of the fight, Pascal had not fought for 28 months. He came in at the 175 limit and Fanlong was slightly lighter at 174.6 pounds.

Pascal scored a 12-round debatable unanimous decision win over Fanlong. Pascal's timing was off, more to do with his time out of the ring, so it took him a few rounds to get going. Fanlong controlled the first half of the fight. During the second half, Pascal came on stronger, beginning to land more effective shots and at the same time Fanlong was still dangerous. Pascal was given a questionable knockdown late in round 9 after a shot which hit Fanlong on his glove. Fanlong then slipped on to the canvas. Fanlong got to his feet and tried to explain to referee Christopher Young, that he slipped. Both traded shots during the final rounds. There was multiple breaks in the final rounds due to Fanlong's glove tape needing attention. The judge scores were 116–111, 115–112 and 114–113 in favor of Pascal. It was interesting to note that had the knockdown in the ninth round not been given, Fanlong was winning the round, and likely been given a 10–9. The end result would have been a split decision draw.

==== Pascal vs. Eifert ====
On July 23, 2022 the IBF formally ordered Pascal and unbeaten British boxer Joshua Buatsi (16–0, 13 KOs) to start negotiations for an eliminator. Pascal had gotten himself back into contention after beating Fanlong, who was previously ranked #1 with IBF. Both teams accepted the invitation, however no deal was reached and purse bids wee scheduled for August 30. During the negotiation period, Buatsi's promoter Eddie Hearn hinted that he could be up against Dmitry Bivol, who held the WBA belt. DiBella Entertainment won the rights of the fight after a winning bid of $975,000. Matchroom also made a bid, $875,000, which fell short. As per IBF rules, Buatsi was entitled to 60% ($585,000), with Pascal taking the remaining $390,000 purse. Contracts were never returned and IBF defaulted the purse bids. One of the reasons for Buatsi being pulled from the fight was Hearn having big plans in the coming year.

IBF ordered Pascal and German boxer Michael Eifert (11–1, 4 KOs) for the eliminator as he was next in line. A purse bid was set for November 1, this time with Pascal taking the 60% purse split. Eifert had never fought professionally outside of Germany before this fight was ordered. Purse bids were avoided as a deal was reached in time. Le Journal de Montreal reported that on the morning of November 25, Pascal was arrested in Montreal. He was suspected to be driving under the influence. The police stated there was a smell of alcohol when he stepped out of the vehicle and he failed a Breathalyzer test. Pascal later took to social media to speak out on the ordeal. He said, “The officer who arrested me did not read me my rights. He handcuffed me in public like I was some vulgar street gangster … I am 40 years old with no criminal history. Why such excessive force?” The post was quickly deleted. He tagged Montreal Police in his next post which read, “Justice for visible minorities!!!” The reason he was initially pulled over was due to taking a right turn at a red light.

Pascal vs. Eifert was announced to take place on February 9 at Place Bell in Laval, a homecoming fight for Pascal. This was Pascal's first fight in Quebec since 2018. Pascal revealed he was involved in some of the undercard matchmaking. After spending years with veteran promoter Yvon Michel, Pascal was interested in going down the boxer-turned-promoter route after he retired. Interestingly, after splitting from Michel in 2014, Pascal started Jean Pascal Promotions. The promotion never took off and soon after Pascal saw himself signing up with InterBox. The card was going to be available in Canada on PPV for $64.99 CAD on platforms Canal Indigo, Bell TV, Shaw TV, Fite.tv and GYMboxe.tv. In early January 2023, Pascal contracted COVID and had to push back his training. Doctors told Pascal he could resume training from February after he had recovered. The fight was pushed back to take place on March 16 at the same venue. Eifert's only loss in his five-year professional career came to Dmitry Bivol in 2018.

Eifert pulled off a big upset defeating Pascal by a one-sided unanimous decision. Pascal was a 7–1 favorite going into the fight. Eifert used one-two combinations and had a high volume of punches to help get the decision and ruin Pascal's homecoming. Pascal looked tired earlier on but never gave up in marching forward making Eifert work for the win. He did land some shots to the back of Pascal's head, which made him groggy. He was also given a warning in the tenth round for putting Pascal in a headlock. During the championship rounds, Eifert slowed down and did not have the power required to inflict more damage on Pascal, however it was the first time he went the 12-round distance. The scores read 117–111, 118–110 and 115–113. The win put Eifert next in line to challenge unified champion Artur Beterbiev. Speaking to reporters after the fight, Pascal said, “It’s always different in Quebec. Normally, the local boxer gets the benefit of the doubt, but that wasn’t the case [Thursday night]. I landed the best shots. I don’t understand this decision. At 118–110, does that mean I won only two rounds?” Orlando Cuellar, Pascal's trainer was also critical towards the results. He felt Eifert's shots mostly landed on Pascal's gloves and the latter still full of energy after the 12 rounds. Despite being in top shape, Pascal was unsure if having COVID just a few months before the fight affected him.

=== Cruiserweight ===
On July 24, 2024 Montreal Gazette reported that Pascal would return to the ring against Terry Osias (13–0, 6 KOs) on September 21 at the Colisée de Laval. At the time of the announcement, it was said that the two would fight for the WBC minor light heavyweight title. It was a back-and-forth encounter with some believing Osias was getting the better of Pascal. The end came when Pascal landed an overhand right, knocking out Osias, giving him the KO win in the tenth round. Going in to the final round, one judge had Osias 87–84 ahead, but overruled by the remaining two judges, who had it 89–82 and 86–85 for Pascal.

==== Pascal vs. Cieślak ====
In April 2025, it was reported that Yamil Perala was scheduled to fight Michal Cieślak on June 28, for the interim WBC cruiserweight title. Perala was ranked #2, with Cieślak at #3. However, there was complications in staging the bout, so the WBC called in Pascal to replace Perala instead to challenge for the interim title. At the time, Pascal was not ranked by the WBC in its top 40. Only the IBF had Pascal in their cruiserweight rankings. During the WBC rankings update for May, Pascal entered at #10, making him eligible to challenge for the belt. The fight was officially announced on May 16, at Place Bell in Laval in Quebec, Canada. Pascal weighed in a light 197.2 pounds, while Cieślak weighed a bit heavier at 199 pounds. Cieślak scored a fourth-round TKO win over a what appeared to be a faded Pascal. Cieślak had now won seven straight fights. In the opening round, Pascal showed some aggression. He came out quick on the attack, throwing hooks. It wasn't long until Cieślak took control of the bout. In the third round, Pascal fell into the ropes and was given a count. It was all Cieślak after this and in round 4, he stepped on the gas and had Pascal staggering around until his corner threw in the towel. The time of stoppage was 1:10.

=== Retirement ===
After losing to Cieślak, Pascal announced his retirement as a professional. He said,

“I wanted to do it. I still have the passion. I still have the gas in the tank. Just tonight I think this was a little too big for me. He was much taller, had a longer reach. Bigger. It was a hard task for me. I guess if I wanted to compete at that level I was going to have to gain more weight. Tonight, I was probably 205. He was probably 225 to 230. If I wanted to compete at that weight class I’d have to get way bigger. Every good thing has an end. Maybe it’s time for me to hang up the gloves. I’m not sure yet what I’m going to do.”

He finished his career with 37 wins, 8 losses and 1 draw.

== Professional boxing record ==
48 fights	37 wins	9 losses
By knockout	21	3
By decision	16	6
Draws	1	
No contests	1	

No.	Result	Record	Opponent	Type	Round, time	Date	Location	Notes
48	Loss	37-9-1 (1)	Francis Lafreniere	UD	10	27 Jun 2026	Colisée de Laval, Laval, Quebec, Canada	For vacant NABA Gold cruiserweight title
47	Loss	37–8–1 (1)	Michał Cieślak	TKO	4 (12), 1:10	28 Jun 2025	Place Bell, Laval, Quebec, Canada	For vacant WBC interim cruiserweight title
46	Win	37–7–1 (1)	Terry Osias	KO	10 (10), 0:56	21 Sep 2024	Colisée de Laval, Laval, Quebec, Canada	Won vacant WBO–NABO cruiserweight title
45	Loss	36–7–1 (1)	Michael Eifert	UD	12	16 Mar 2023	Place Bell, Laval, Quebec, Canada	
44	Win	36–6–1 (1)	Meng Fanlong	UD	12	20 May 2022	Whitesands Events Center, Plant City, Florida, U.S.	
43	Win	35–6–1 (1)	Badou Jack	SD	12	28 Dec 2019	State Farm Arena, Atlanta, Georgia, U.S.	Retained WBA (Regular) and WBC Silver light-heavyweight titles
42	Win	34–6–1 (1)	Marcus Browne	TD	8 (12), 1:49	3 Aug 2019	Barclays Center, Brooklyn, New York, U.S.	Won WBA interim and WBC Silver light-heavyweight titles; Unanimous TD: Browne cut from an accidental head clash
41	Loss	33–6–1 (1)	Dmitry Bivol	UD	12	24 Nov 2018	Etess Arena, Atlantic City, New Jersey, U.S.	For WBA light-heavyweight title
40	Win	33–5–1 (1)	Steve Bossé	TKO	8 (10), 3:00	30 Jul 2018	Place Bell, Laval, Quebec, Canada	
39	Win	32–5–1 (1)	Ahmed Elbiali	TKO	6 (10), 2:06	8 Dec 2017	Park Race Track, Hialeah, Florida, U.S.	
38	Loss	31–5–1 (1)	Eleider Álvarez	MD	12	3 Jun 2017	Bell Centre, Montreal, Quebec, Canada	For WBC Silver light-heavyweight title
37	Win	31–4–1 (1)	Ricardo Marcelo Ramallo	TKO	3 (10), 1:45	16 Dec 2016	Amphithéâtre Cogeco, Trois-Rivières, Quebec, Canada	
36	Loss	30–4–1 (1)	Sergey Kovalev	RTD	7 (12), 3:00	30 Jan 2016	Bell Centre, Montreal, Quebec, Canada	For WBA (Super), IBF and WBO light-heavyweight titles
35	Win	30–3–1 (1)	Yunieski Gonzalez	UD	10	25 Jul 2015	Mandalay Bay Events Center, Paradise, Nevada, U.S.	
34	Loss	29–3–1 (1)	Sergey Kovalev	TKO	8 (12), 1:03	14 Mar 2015	Bell Centre, Montreal, Quebec, Canada	For WBA (Super), IBF, and WBO light-heavyweight titles
33	NC	29–2–1 (1)	Roberto Bolonti	NC	2 (10), 2:29	6 Dec 2014	Bell Centre, Montreal, Quebec, Canada	Bolonti unable to continue after an accidental foul
32	Win	29–2–1	Lucian Bute	UD	12	18 Jan 2014	Bell Centre, Montreal, Quebec, Canada	Won WBC–NABF light-heavyweight title
31	Win	28–2–1	George Blades	TKO	5 (10)	28 Sep 2013	Bell Centre, Montreal, Quebec, Canada	
30	Win	27–2–1	Aleksy Kuziemski	UD	10	14 Dec 2012	Bell Centre, Montreal, Quebec, Canada	
29	Loss	26–2–1	Bernard Hopkins	UD	12	21 May 2011	Bell Centre, Montreal, Quebec, Canada	Lost WBC, IBO, and The Ring light-heavyweight titles
28	Draw	26–1–1	Bernard Hopkins	MD	12	18 Dec 2010	Colisée Pepsi, Quebec City, Quebec, Canada	Retained WBC, IBO, and The Ring light-heavyweight titles
27	Win	26–1	Chad Dawson	TD	11 (12), 2:06	14 Aug 2010	Bell Centre, Montreal, Quebec, Canada	Retained WBC light-heavyweight title; Won IBO and vacant The Ring light-heavyweight titles; Unanimous TD: Dawson cut from an accidental head clash
26	Win	25–1	Adrian Diaconu	UD	12	11 Dec 2009	Bell Centre, Montreal, Quebec, Canada	Retained WBC light-heavyweight title
25	Win	24–1	Silvio Branco	TKO	10 (12), 2:19	25 Sep 2009	Bell Centre, Montreal, Quebec, Canada	Retained WBC light-heavyweight title
24	Win	23–1	Adrian Diaconu	UD	12	19 Jun 2009	Bell Centre, Montreal, Quebec, Canada	Won WBC light-heavyweight title
23	Win	22–1	Pablo Daniel Zamora Nievas	KO	5 (12), 0:42	4 Apr 2009	Montreal Casino, Montreal, Quebec, Canada	Won vacant WBO Inter-Continental super-middleweight title
22	Loss	21–1	Carl Froch	UD	12	6 Dec 2008	Trent FM Arena, Nottingham, England	For vacant WBC super-middleweight title
21	Win	21–0	Omar Pittman	UD	10	11 Jan 2008	Hard Rock Live, Hollywood, Florida, U.S.	
20	Win	20–0	Brian Norman	UD	10	7 Dec 2007	Bell Centre, Montreal, Quebec, Canada	Retained WBC–NABF, WBA–NABA, and WBO–NABO super-middleweight titles
19	Win	19–0	Esteban Camou	KO	3 (10), 2:37	6 Oct 2007	Montreal Casino, Montreal, Quebec, Canada	
18	Win	18–0	Kingsley Ikeke	UD	12	3 Aug 2007	Centre Pierre Charbonneau, Montreal, Quebec, Canada	Retained WBC–NABF super-middleweight title
17	Win	17–0	Christian Cruz	TKO	10 (12), 2:00	8 Jun 2007	Uniprix Stadium, Montreal, Quebec, Canada	Retained WBO–NABO super-middleweight title; Won vacant WBC–NABF and WBA–NABA super-middleweight titles
16	Win	16–0	La Farrell Bunting	UD	12	10 Mar 2007	Montreal Casino, Montreal, Quebec, Canada	Retained WBO–NABO super-middleweight title
15	Win	15–0	Jermain Mackey	UD	12	18 Nov 2006	Colisée, Trois-Rivières, Quebec, Canada	Won WBO–NABO super-middleweight title
14	Win	14–0	Lucas Green Arias	TKO	6 (12), 3:00	30 Sep 2006	Montreal Casino, Montreal, Quebec, Canada	Won vacant WBC Latino super-middleweight title
13	Win	13–0	Darnell Boone	UD	10	23 Jun 2006	Uniprix Stadium, Montreal, Quebec, Canada	Won vacant TAB super-middleweight title
12	Win	12–0	Melroy Corbin	TKO	5 (8), 2:37	11 Mar 2006	Montreal Casino, Montreal, Quebec, Canada	
11	Win	11–0	Eric Howard	TKO	2 (8), 2:30	25 Feb 2006	Casino du Lac-Leamy, Gatineau, Quebec, Canada	
10	Win	10–0	Martin Desjardins	TKO	7 (10), 2:16	10 Dec 2005	Montreal Casino, Montreal, Quebec, Canada	Won vacant CBF and QBC super-middleweight titles
9	Win	9–0	Gerardo Soria	TKO	4 (8), 2:36	19 Nov 2005	Université, Sherbrooke, Quebec, Canada	
8	Win	8–0	James Crawford	TKO	3 (8), 1:47	29 Oct 2005	Casino du Lac-Leamy, Gatineau, Quebec, Canada	
7	Win	7–0	Jesse Sanders	KO	1 (6), 1:45	15 Oct 2005	Montreal Casino, Montreal, Quebec, Canada	
6	Win	6–0	Ricardo Kellman	TKO	2 (6), 2:50	10 Sep 2005	Montreal Casino, Montreal, Quebec, Canada	
5	Win	5–0	Homer Gibbins	TKO	2 (4), 1:45	13 Jul 2005	Métropolis, Montreal, Quebec, Canada	
4	Win	4–0	Donnie Pendelton	TKO	2 (4), 3:00	18 Jun 2005	Bell Centre, Montreal, Quebec, Canada	
3	Win	3–0	Eddie O'Neal	UD	4	3 Mar 2005	Club Soda, Montreal, Quebec, Canada	
2	Win	2–0	Jesse Londo	KO	1 (4), 0:50	12 Feb 2005	Montreal Casino, Montreal, Quebec, Canada	
1	Win	1–0	Justin Hahn	TKO	2 (4), 2:17	3 Feb 2005	Club Soda, Montreal, Quebec, Canada	

== Titles in boxing ==
=== Major world titles ===
- WBC light heavyweight champion (175 lbs)

=== Secondary major world titles (Note: The secondary champion lineage lists the Regular or Unified champions while the primary champion is occupied.) ===
- WBA (Regular) light heavyweight champion (Note: Promoted from interim and reigned as secondary champion from October 10, 2019 – July 9, 2021, but was never considered the primary champion.) (175 lbs)

=== The Ring magazine titles ===
- The Ring light heavyweight champion (175 lbs)

=== Interim/Silver world titles (Note: In 2010, the WBC created the "Silver Championship", intended as a replacement for interim titles.) ===
- WBA interim light heavyweight champion (175 lbs)
- WBC Silver light heavyweight champion (175 lbs)

=== Minor world titles ===
- IBO light heavyweight champion (175 lbs)

=== Regional/International titles ===
- CBF super middleweight champion (168 lbs)
- QBC (Note: Quebec Boxing Council.) super middleweight champion (168 lbs)
- TAB super middleweight champion (168 lbs)
- WBC Latino super middleweight champion (168 lbs)
- NABO super middleweight champion (168 lbs)
- NABF super middleweight champion (168 lbs)
- NABA super middleweight champion (168 lbs)
- WBO Inter-Continental super middleweight champion (168 lbs)
- NABF light heavyweight champion (175 lbs)
- NABO cruiserweight champion (200 lbs)

=== Honorary titles ===
- WBC Diamond light heavyweight champion

== See also ==
- List of world light-heavyweight boxing champions

== Notes and references ==
=== References ===
Sporting positions
Regional boxing titles
Vacant Title last held by Otis Grant	CBF super-middleweight champion 10 December 2005 – December 2007; Vacated	Vacant Title next held by Adonis Stevenson
New title	QBC super-middleweight champion 10 December 2005 – May 2006; Vacated	Vacant Title next held by Nicholson Poulard
New title	TAB super-middleweight champion 23 June 2006 – June 2009; Vacated	Title discontinued
Vacant Title last held by Librado Andrade	WBC Latino super-middleweight champion 30 September 2006 – November 2006; Vacated	Vacant Title next held by Pablo Oscar Natalio Farias
Vacant Title last held by Chad Dawson	WBO–NABO super-middleweight champion 18 November 2006 – June 2008; Vacated	Vacant Title next held by Andre Ward
Vacant Title last held by Lucian Bute	WBC–NABF super-middleweight champion 8 June 2006 – August 2008; Vacated	Vacant Title next held by Peter Manfredo Jr.
Vacant Title last held by Lucian Bute	WBA–NABA super-middleweight champion 8 June 2006 – December 2008; Vacated	Vacant Title next held by Derek Edwards
Vacant Title last held by Károly Balzsay	WBO Inter-Continental super-middleweight champion 9 April 2009 – June 2009; Vacated	Vacant Title next held by Eduard Gutknecht
Vacant Title last held by Lucian Bute	WBC–NABF light-heavyweight champion 18 January 2014 – March 2015; Vacated	Vacant Title next held by Isaac Chilemba
Minor world boxing titles
Preceded by Chad Dawson	IBO light-heavyweight champion 14 August 2010 – 21 May 2011; Vacant after loss to Hopkins	Vacant Title next held by Andrzej Fonfara
Major world boxing titles
Preceded by Adrian Diaconu	WBC light-heavyweight champion 19 June 2009 – 21 May 2011	Succeeded by Bernard Hopkins
Vacant Title last held by Joe Calzaghe	The Ring light-heavyweight champion 14 August 2010 – 21 May 2011	Succeeded by Bernard Hopkins
Preceded by Marcus Browne	WBA light-heavyweight champion Interim title 3 August 2019 – 10 October 2019; Promoted	Vacant Title next held by Dominic Boesel
Vacant Title last held by Badou Jack	WBA light-heavyweight champion Regular title 10 October 2019 – 8 July 2021; Stripped	Vacant Title next held by David Morrell
