= Adrian Diaconu =

Romanian boxer

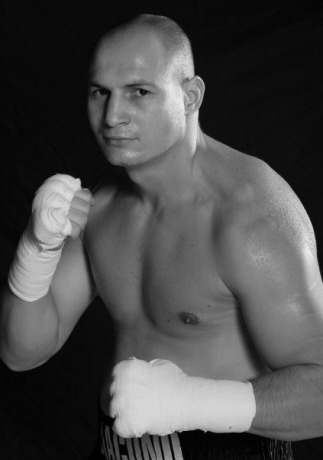
- Diaconu in 2007

Personal information
- Nickname: The Shark
- Nationality: Romanian
- Born: 9 June 1978 (age 48) Ploieşti, Romania
- Height: 1.75 m (5 ft 9 in)
- Weight: Light-heavyweight

Boxing career
- Reach: 183 cm (72 in)
- Stance: Orthodox

Boxing record
- Total fights: 30
- Wins: 27
- Win by KO: 15
- Losses: 3
Medal record
Representing Romania
Men's amateur boxing
World Championships
Silver medal – second place	1999 Houston	Middleweight
Bronze medal – third place	1997 Budapest	Light-middleweight
European Championships
Bronze medal – third place	1998 Minsk	Light-middleweight

Adrian Diaconu (born 9 June 1978) is a Romanian former professional boxer who competed from 2001 to 2011, and held the WBC light-heavyweight title from 2008 to 2009. As an amateur he won a silver medal in the middleweight division at the 1999 World Championships and bronze in the light-middleweight division at the 1997 World Championships. Diaconu was born in Ploieşti, Romania, but fought out of Montreal, Quebec, Canada for almost his entire professional career.

== Amateur career ==
Diaconu represented Romania at the 2000 Olympics in the middleweight division.

Olympic results:

- Defeated Abdelhani Kenzi (Algeria) 19-9
- Defeated Jitender Kumar (India) 12-3
- Lost to Jorge Gutiérrez (Cuba) KO 1

== Professional career ==
Following the Olympics, Diaconu made his professional debut in 2001 and competed exclusively as a light-heavyweight. He went on to claim his first regional championship in June 2005, winning the Canadian title with a fifth-round knockout of Conal MacPhee. In December 2005, Diaconu won the WBC International title after knocking out Darrin Humphrey. This was followed up with a knockout against Max Heyman to win the vacant WBA–NABA and TAB titles. Diaconu vacated his Canadian title to face Rico Hoye in an eliminator bout for the WBC world title. He was successful, dominating Hoye until a stoppage in the third round. With the win, Diaconu became the mandatory challenger for then-WBC world champion Chad Dawson.

In October 2007, world cruiserweight champion David Haye described Diaconu as "the future of the light-heavyweight division."

On 19 April 2008, Diaconu won the vacant WBC interim title with a twelve-round unanimous decision over Chris Henry in Romania; the interim title being at stake to allow full titleholder Chad Dawson to make an optional defense after a previous injury-produced delay to the mandated bout. In July 2008, Diaconu was elevated to full champion status after Dawson vacated the title to avoid having to make the mandatory defense.

Diaconu suffered his first career defeat and lost the WBC world title to Jean Pascal on 19 June 2009, and would go on to lose a rematch on 11 December 2009. Diaconu's final professional fight took place on 21 May 2011 against former champion Chad Dawson, who defeated Diaconu by a unanimous decision after twelve rounds. A year later, Diaconu announced his retirement from boxing, stating that he felt a lack of support from his promoters, Interbox, to organize significant fights for him.

== Professional boxing record ==
30 fights	27 wins	3 losses
By knockout	15	0
By decision	12	3

No.	Result	Record	Opponent	Type	Round, time	Date	Location	Notes
30	Loss	27–3	Chad Dawson	UD	12	21 May 2011	Bell Centre, Montreal, Quebec, Canada	
29	Win	27–2	Omar Sheika	UD	10	15 Oct 2010	Bell Centre, Montreal, Quebec, Canada	
28	Loss	26–2	Jean Pascal	UD	12	11 Dec 2009	Bell Centre, Montreal, Quebec, Canada	For WBC light-heavyweight title
27	Loss	26–1	Jean Pascal	UD	12	19 May 2009	Bell Centre, Montreal, Quebec, Canada	Lost WBC light-heavyweight title
26	Win	26–0	David Whittom	UD	8	4 Apr 2009	Bell Centre, Montreal, Quebec, Canada	
25	Win	25–0	Chris Henry	UD	12	19 Apr 2008	Polyvalent Hall, Bucharest, Romania	Won WBC interim light-heavyweight title
24	Win	24–0	Rico Hoye	TKO	3 (12), 0:32	9 May 2007	Studio Mel's, Montreal, Quebec, Canada	
23	Win	23–0	Orlando Rivera	UD	10	15 Sep 2006	Bell Centre, Montreal, Quebec, Canada	
22	Win	22–0	Andre Thysse	UD	12	16 May 2006	Bell Centre, Montreal, Quebec, Canada	Retained WBC International light-heavyweight title
21	Win	21–0	Max Heyman	KO	4 (12), 3:00	24 Mar 2006	Bell Centre, Montreal, Quebec, Canada	Won vacant WBA–NABA and TAB light-heavyweight titles
20	Win	20–0	Darrin Humphrey	TKO	11 (12), 2:56	2 Dec 2005	Bell Centre, Montreal, Quebec, Canada	Won vacant WBC International light-heavyweight title
19	Win	19–0	Conal MacPhee	TKO	2 (10), 2:00	16 Sep 2005	Bell Centre, Montreal, Quebec, Canada	Retained Canada light-heavyweight title
18	Win	18–0	Conal MacPhee	TKO	5 (10), 3:00	3 May 2005	Maurice Richard Arena, Montreal, Quebec, Canada	Won vacant Canada light-heavyweight title
17	Win	17–0	James Crawford	TKO	1 (8)	12 Apr 2005	Galaţi, Romania	
16	Win	16–0	Jesse Sanders	TKO	4 (6), 3:00	18 Mar 2005	Bell Centre, Montreal, Quebec, Canada	
15	Win	15–0	Roberto Coelho	UD	10	20 Mar 2004	Montreal Casino, Montreal, Quebec, Canada	
14	Win	14–0	Rico Cason	TKO	3 (8), 2:45	20 Dec 2003	Bell Centre, Montreal, Quebec, Canada	
13	Win	13–0	Tiwon Taylor	KO	2 (8), 1:14	22 Nov 2003	Bell Centre, Montreal, Quebec, Canada	
12	Win	12–0	Ronald Cobbs	TKO	3 (6)	17 May 2003	Petersen Events Center, Pittsburgh, Pennsylvania, US	
11	Win	11–0	Isidore Janvier	UD	8	5 Apr 2003	Arena Leipzig, Leipzig, Germany	
10	Win	10–0	Ron Johnson	KO	1 (8), 1:44	28 Feb 2003	Aréna Léonard-Grondin, Granby, Quebec, Canada	
9	Win	9–0	Shaun Creegan	UD	8	14 Dec 2002	Armory, Dorchester, Massachusetts, US	
8	Win	8–0	Kenny Bowman	MD	6	6 Sep 2002	Bell Centre, Montreal, Quebec, Canada	
7	Win	7–0	Ganny Dovidovas	KO	3 (8)	31 May 2002	Polyvalent Hall, Bucharest, Romania	
6	Win	6–0	Melroy Corbin	UD	6	26 Apr 2002	Hershey Centre, Mississauga, Ontario, Canada	
5	Win	5–0	Francis Doiron	KO	1 (6), 1:40	30 Nov 2001	Molson Centre, Montreal, Quebec, Canada	
4	Win	4–0	Claudio Ortiz	UD	4	20 Jul 2001	Stade L.P. Gaucher, Saint-Hyacinthe, Quebec, Canada	
3	Win	3–0	Eric Olds	UD	4	10 Jul 2001	Molson Centre, Montreal, Quebec, Canada	
2	Win	2–0	Todd Black	KO	1 (4), 0:36	5 Jun 2001	Pavillon de la Jeunesse, Trois-Rivières, Quebec, Canada	
1	Win	1–0	Mark Newton	TKO	1 (4), 2:34	2 Mar 2001	Molson Centre, Montreal, Quebec, Canada	Professional debut

Sporting positions
Regional boxing titles
Vacant Title last held by Éric Lucas	Canada light-heavyweight champion 3 June 2005 – June 2007; Vacated	Vacant Title next held by Jason Naugler
Vacant Title last held by Pietro Aurino	WBC International light-heavyweight champion 2 December 2005 – October 2007; Vacated	Vacant Title next held by Silvio Branco
Vacant Title last held by George Khalid Jones	WBA–NABA light-heavyweight champion 24 March 2006 – August 2007; Vacated	Vacant Title next held by Chris Henry
New title	TAB light-heavyweight champion 24 March 2006 – 2008; Vacated	Title discontinued
World boxing titles
Vacant Title last held by Roy Jones Jr.	WBC light-heavyweight champion Interim title 19 April 2008 – 11 July 2008; Promoted	Vacant Title next held by Chad Dawson
Preceded by Chad Dawson vacated	WBC light heavyweight champion 11 July 2008 – 19 June 2009	Succeeded by Jean Pascal
