= Chad Dawson =

American boxer

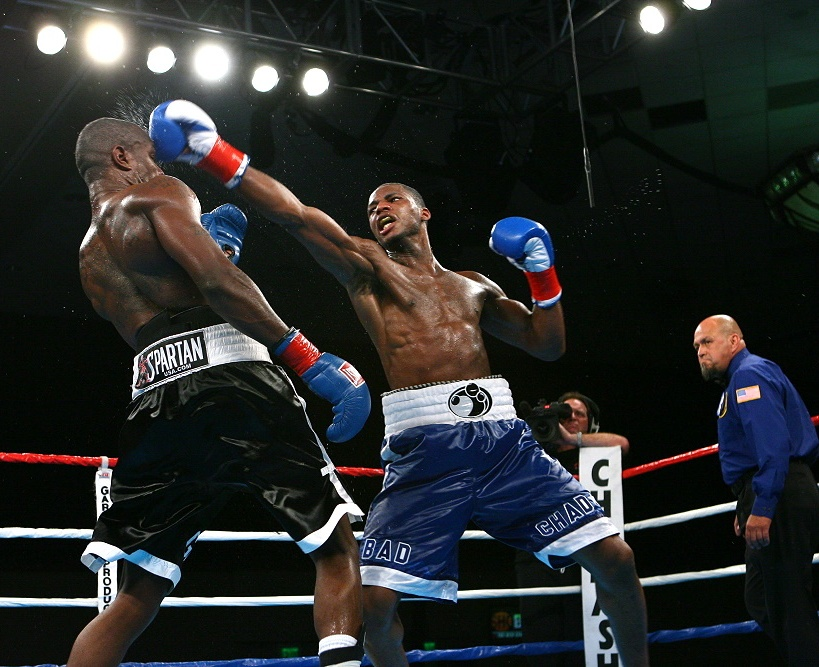
- Dawson (right) vs. Eric Harding, 2006

Personal information
- Nickname: Bad
- Born: July 13, 1982 (age 44) Hartsville, South Carolina, U.S.
- Height: 6 ft 1 in (185 cm)
- Weight: Middleweight; Super middleweight; Light heavyweight

Boxing career
- Reach: 76 1/2 in (194 cm)
- Stance: Southpaw

Boxing record
- Total fights: 43
- Wins: 36
- Win by KO: 19
- Losses: 5
- No contests: 2

Chad Dawson (born July 13, 1982) is an American former professional boxer who competed from 2001 to 2019. He held multiple world championships at light heavyweight, and was one of the most highly regarded boxers in that weight class between 2006 and 2013.

Dawson rose to prominence on the world stage in 2007, when he defeated Tomasz Adamek to win the World Boxing Council (WBC) light heavyweight title. After vacating that title, he defeated Antonio Tarver in 2008 to win the International Boxing Federation (IBF) and International Boxing Organization (IBO) titles, and defeated him in a rematch in 2009.

Dawson's first career setback was a loss to Jean Pascal in 2010. He would rebound by winning the WBC title for a second time, as well as the Ring magazine and lineal titles, by defeating Bernard Hopkins in 2012. In the same year, The Ring ranked Dawson as the world's tenth best active boxer, pound for pound.

Later in 2012, Dawson moved down to super middleweight, a division in which he had not competed since 2006, in order to challenge Andre Ward for his unified titles. In what would prove to be an ill-fated move, Ward handed him his second loss as it became clear that Dawson could no longer compete at a lower weight. In 2013, having returned to light heavyweight to defend his titles, Dawson was knocked out by Adonis Stevenson in one round.

== Early life ==
Dawson was born to Rick Dawson, a former boxer who compiled a 2–6–1 professional record, and Wanda Dawson. Chad has four brothers and two sisters. In search of work, Rick moved the family to New Haven, Connecticut in 1988. Chad attended James Hillhouse High School from 1996 to 2000.

== Professional career ==
=== Middleweight ===
Dawson, a southpaw, made his professional debut at middleweight, later moving up to super middleweight where defeated notable opponents such as Ian Gardner and Carl Daniels. His career took a temporary setback when he failed a post-fight drug test in 2004 for marijuana, which resulted in a six-month suspension from boxing. Dawson indicated that this proved to be a motivating factor in his rise as a light heavyweight. Because of this, Dawson's streak of fourteen consecutive wins came to end when his win over Aundalen Sloan on March 27, 2004, was changed to a no contest.

=== Light heavyweight ===
On June 2, 2006, in his bout with former title challenger and fellow southpaw Eric Harding, Dawson won a unanimous decision and claimed the regional NABF light heavyweight title. After suffering a flash knockdown in the opening seconds of the first round, Dawson dominated the fight and pulled away on the judges' scorecards by 117–110, 117–110, and 116–111.

==== WBC champion ====
At age 24, on February 3, 2007, Dawson won the WBC light heavyweight title against the undefeated, top-ten ranked champion Tomasz Adamek. The judges gave Dawson a unanimous decision victory, with scores of 118–108, 117–109, and 116–110. In June 2007, Dawson defended the WBC title for the first time, in a fight with Jesus Ruiz (19–5–0), winning by technical knockout in round six. The fight was broadcast on Showtime as part of a card that featured former light heavyweight champion Antonio Tarver. On September 29, 2007, Dawson defeated Epifanio Mendoza by fourth-round TKO in his second title defense. In April 2008 as his third title defense, Dawson retained the belt by a controversial unanimous decision victory against challenger Glen Johnson. The three judges each had the fight scored 116–112 in favor of the champion Dawson. Again aired on Showtime, for Dawson the card marked the second occasion for which he and Tarver fought in separate bouts on the same card, with Tarver winning each featured bout.

Dawson then vacated the WBC title in mid-2008.

==== IBF champion ====
On October 11, 2008, at the Palms Casino in Las Vegas, Dawson fought IBF light heavyweight title holder Antonio Tarver. Dawson, who controlled the pace and landed most of the significant punches for a majority of the fight, was more active in methodically wearing out his opponent. Tarver landed the occasional punch, but Dawson was in control for most of the fight. With 2:11 left in the final round, Dawson scored a knockdown against Tarver, the only knockdown in the fight. Dawson won the fight by unanimous decision with scores of 117–110 from two judges and 118–109 from the third judge. Dawson earned $800,000 for the fight and Tarver earned $1 million.

On November 9, the day after Joe Calzaghe's win over Roy Jones Jr., Dawson issued a press release challenging Calzaghe and offered to fight him on his home turf in Wales. Dawson stated "I'm ready to give Joe the opportunity to draw the curtain on his great career in front of his family and friends and 70,000 fans," and "It's the best fight in the light heavyweight division between two undefeated champions." Calzaghe was to retire weeks later, as had been expected prior to the Jones Jr bout. Dawson himself was complimentary about the departing Welsh champion, stating "I applaud Joe's decision. It's obvious he and his family gave it a lot of thought. Timing is everything, and to leave center stage at his peak is rare and certainly comparable to the retirements of Rocky Marciano and Jim Brown."

Seven months after their first fight, Dawson and Tarver fought a rematch on May 9, 2009, in Las Vegas. The fight was similar to their first, with Dawson in control most of the fight, outworking Tarver much of the fight, and earning another unanimous decision win. The judges scorecards were 117–111, 117–111 and 116–112, all in favor of Dawson.

On May 27, 2009, Dawson vacated the IBF light heavyweight title to negotiate a rematch with Glen Johnson. On November 7, 2009, Dawson once again outpointed Glen Johnson. This time was more convincing but the judges scored it 117–111, 115–113 and 115–113 all for Dawson.

==== First defeat against Pascal ====
The next step in Dawson's career was a shot to regain the WBC title against Top 10 light heavyweight Jean Pascal on August 14, 2010, in Montreal and was for The Ring light heavyweight title. Pascal won the fight by technical decision in round 11 after an accidental head butt. All three judges had Pascal winning by a considerably wide margin at the time of the stoppage.

Dawson returned to action on May 21, 2011, against Adrian Diaconu and defeated Diaconu by unanimous decision. His first bout under the guidance of Emanuel Steward.

==== Dawson vs. Hopkins I, II ====
Dawson initially won The Ring, WBC and lineal light heavyweight titles due to a controversial TKO win, when Hopkins was unable to continue after getting thrown from a clinch. However, on October 20, 2011, the TKO ruling was ruled a Technical Draw by the WBC and Hopkins remained the champion. On December 13, 2011, the California State Athletic Commission changed the official decision to a No Contest (NC). Two days later, the WBC ordered a rematch between Hopkins and Dawson.

Dawson and Bernard Hopkins met again on April 28, 2012, at Boardwalk Hall in Atlantic City. The fight was slow-paced, with Dawson controlling most of the action and pace of the fight. Hopkins would throw and land an occasional punch, but Dawson would land the harder and more effective punches and outwork Hopkins for much of the fight. Noteworthy to mention is a period after a middle round where his trainer, former contender Iceman John Scully, caught Dawson mentally slipping and motivated him back into focus. The key moment in the fight was noted during the broadcast by HBO's Emanuel Steward and Jim Lampley. Dawson went on to win the fight by majority decision, with the judges scorecards reading 114–114, 117–111 and 117–111.

Compubox had Dawson outlanding Hopkins throughout the fight. Dawson landed 151 of 431 (35%) of his total punches, to Hopkins' landing 106 of 400 (26%) of his. Dawson said after the fight he is very interested in fighting WBC super middleweight champion Andre Ward, as well as fighting in a rematch with Jean Pascal.

==== Dawson vs. Ward ====
On September 8, 2012, Dawson stepped down a weight division (a rarity in the sport) to take on WBA, WBC, The Ring and lineal super middleweight champion, Super Six World Boxing Classic winner and one of the universally recognized top pound-for-pound fighters in the world Andre Ward.

Reports surfaced that Dawson was knocked out by Edison Miranda in sparring for the Ward fight. The fight started quite cagey with both fighters feeling each other out and only exchanging single shots, with Dawson landing his jab on Ward comfortably. In the 3rd round, a clash of heads changed the entire landscape of the fight in Ward's favour, as he seemed to have found out his opponent and proceeded to catch Dawson with some telling shots, dropping him to one knee with a right to the body and short overhand left hook. Dawson quickly rose to an 8-count and appeared to be dazed but managed to see out the round and return to his corner. In round 4, Ward showed no sign of letting up, upping the tempo and again catching a sluggish Dawson with a close left hook, again causing him to drop to his knee and the ref gave Dawson another 8 count. Dawson showed great resilience to see out the round and went on for the next 4 rounds avoiding Wards' troublesome left hooks with little activity himself. In round 10, it all came to an end as Dawson looked to have tired from Wards' consistent battery and possibly because of the weight loss also, he was caught flush with 4 shots in a row appearing to voluntarily take a knee. The referee stepped in asking Dawson if he wanted the fight stopped, Dawson did not speak but had the body language of a defeated man. The fight was called off and Ward retained his titles.

==== Dawson vs. Stevenson ====
On June 8, 2013, after his loss to Ward, Dawson returned to light heavyweight and defended his WBC, lineal, and The Ring titles against Haitian-Canadian Adonis Stevenson, a super middleweight contender who was fighting his first match at light heavyweight. The fight took place in Montreal, Stevenson's adopted hometown and where Dawson was fighting for the third time in the past two years.

Although Dawson entered the fight as a favorite, many were worried that draining himself to fight Ward, and the Ward fight itself had taken something from Dawson. Early in the fight he was caught with a hard left hook and fell backwards to the canvas. Although he got up from the punch and rose before the count of eight, the referee noticed that Dawson's legs were unsteady and stopped the fight at 1:11 of the first round despite the protests of Dawson and his trainer Eddie Mustafa Muhammad. It was the first time in Dawson's career that he had been knocked out in the first round.

==== Return to the ring ====
After taking the rest of 2013 off Dawson accepted a fight with journeyman George Blades, which was televised as part of the preliminary bout undercard of a Showtime event on June 14, 2014. The fight was fought in the cruiserweight division, at a catchweight of 179 pounds. Dawson failed to make weight for the contest, weighing in at 182.8 pounds, and thus had to forfeit one-fifth of his $15,000 purse.

Dawson knocked Blades out in the first round after dropping him twice. After the fight he said he wanted to start competing for a world title again and would be fighting at light heavyweight.

However Dawson's career took another hit when on October 4, 2014, he lost a split decision to Tommy Karpency. Dawson looked listless in the fight, displaying little of his once vaunted athleticism. After the fight Dawson maintained that he injured his left hand in the third round, stating that it prevented him from throwing combinations.

== Personal life ==
Dawson, who is married and has three sons, still lives and trains in New Haven, Connecticut. His trainer is "Iceman" John Scully. He was formerly trained by Dan Birmingham, Floyd Mayweather Sr. and Eddie Mustafa Muhammad.

== Professional boxing record ==
43 fights	36 wins	5 losses
By knockout	19	3
By decision	17	2
No contests	2	

No.	Result	Record	Opponent	Type	Round, time	Date	Location	Notes
43	Win	36–5 (2)	Denis Grachev	UD	8	Oct 11, 2019	Convention Center, Hartford, Connecticut, U.S.	Won vacant WBC–USNBC light heavyweight title
42	Win	35–5 (2)	Quinton Rankin	UD	8	Jun 29, 2019	Foxwoods Resort Casino, Ledyard, Connecticut, U.S.	
41	Loss	34–5 (2)	Andrzej Fonfara	TKO	10 (10), 0:38	Mar 4, 2017	Barclays Center, New York City, New York, U.S.	
40	Win	34–4 (2)	Cornelius White	TKO	4 (10), 2:26	Apr 16, 2016	Foxwoods Resort Casino, Ledyard, Connecticut, U.S.	
39	Win	33–4 (2)	Shujaa El Amin	UD	10	Dec 8, 2015	Sun National Bank Center, Trenton, New Jersey, U.S.	
38	Loss	32–4 (2)	Tommy Karpency	SD	10	Oct 4, 2014	Foxwoods Resort Casino, Ledyard, Connecticut, U.S.	
37	Win	32–3 (2)	George Blades	KO	1 (10), 2:35	Jun 21, 2014	StubHub Center, Carson, California, U.S.	
36	Loss	31–3 (2)	Adonis Stevenson	TKO	1 (12), 1:16	Jun 8, 2013	Centre Bell, Montreal, Quebec, Canada	Lost WBC and The Ring light heavyweight titles
35	Loss	31–2 (2)	Andre Ward	TKO	10 (12), 2:45	Sep 8, 2012	Oracle Arena, Oakland, California, U.S.	For WBA (Super), WBC, and The Ring super middleweight titles
34	Win	31–1 (2)	Bernard Hopkins	MD	12	Apr 28, 2012	Boardwalk Hall, Atlantic City, New Jersey, U.S.	Won WBC and The Ring light heavyweight titles
33	NC	30–1 (2)	Bernard Hopkins	TKO	2 (12), 2:48	Oct 15, 2011	Staples Center, Los Angeles, California, U.S.	WBC and The Ring light heavyweight titles at stake; Originally TKO win for Dawson, later ruled NC after an incorrect referee call
32	Win	30–1 (1)	Adrian Diaconu	UD	12	May 21, 2011	Centre Bell, Montreal, Quebec, Canada	
31	Loss	29–1 (1)	Jean Pascal	TD	11 (12), 2:06	Aug 14, 2010	Centre Bell, Montreal, Quebec, Canada	For WBC and vacant The Ring light heavyweight titles; Unanimous TD: Dawson cut from an accidental head clash
30	Win	29–0 (1)	Glen Johnson	UD	12	Nov 7, 2009	XL Center, Hartford, Connecticut, U.S.	Won vacant WBC interim light heavyweight title
29	Win	28–0 (1)	Antonio Tarver	UD	12	May 9, 2009	The Joint, Paradise, Nevada, U.S.	Retained IBF light heavyweight title
28	Win	27–0 (1)	Antonio Tarver	UD	12	Oct 11, 2008	Pearl Concert Theater, Paradise, Nevada, U.S.	Won IBF and IBO light heavyweight titles
27	Win	26–0 (1)	Glen Johnson	UD	12	Apr 12, 2008	St. Pete Times Forum, Tampa, Florida, U.S.	Retained WBC light heavyweight title
26	Win	25–0 (1)	Epifanio Mendoza	TKO	4 (12), 2:30	Sep 29, 2007	ARCO Arena, Sacramento, California, U.S.	Retained WBC light heavyweight title
25	Win	24–0 (1)	Jesus Ruiz	TKO	6 (12), 2:00	Jun 9, 2007	Convention Center, Hartford, Connecticut, U.S.	Retained WBC light heavyweight title
24	Win	23–0 (1)	Tomasz Adamek	UD	12	Feb 3, 2007	Silver Spurs Arena, Kissimmee, Florida, U.S.	Won WBC light heavyweight title
23	Win	22–0 (1)	Eric Harding	UD	12	Jun 2, 2006	Chumash Casino Resort, Santa Ynez, California, U.S.	Won NABF light heavyweight title
22	Win	21–0 (1)	Jamie Hearn	TKO	3 (8), 2:07	Mar 4, 2006	MEN Arena, Manchester, England	
21	Win	20–0 (1)	Jason Naugler	UD	8	Feb 4, 2006	Don Haskins Center, El Paso, Texas, U.S.	
20	Win	19–0 (1)	Ian Gardner	TKO	11 (12), 1:12	Nov 18, 2005	Athletic Center, New Haven, Connecticut, U.S.	Won vacant NABO super middleweight title
19	Win	18–0 (1)	Ronald Boddie	TKO	3 (8)	Aug 6, 2005	St. Pete Times Forum, Tampa, Florida, U.S.	
18	Win	17–0 (1)	Efrain Garcia	RTD	4 (10), 3:00	Apr 1, 2005	City Wide Fieldhouse, New Haven, Connecticut, U.S.	Retained WBC Youth middleweight title
17	Win	16–0 (1)	Carl Daniels	TKO	7 (10), 3:00	Dec 10, 2004	Foxwoods Resort Casino, Ledyard, Connecticut, U.S.	Retained WBC Youth middleweight title
16	Win	15–0 (1)	Darnell Wilson	UD	10	Oct 29, 2004	Foxwoods Resort Casino, Ledyard, Connecticut, U.S.	Retained WBC Youth middleweight title
15	NC	14–0 (1)	Aundalen Sloan	UD	6	Mar 27, 2004	Foxwoods Resort Casino, Ledyard, Connecticut, U.S.	Originally UD win for Dawson, later ruled NC after he failed a drug test
14	Win	14–0	Dumont Welliver	RTD	8 (10), 3:00	Oct 31, 2003	Dunkin' Donuts Center, Providence, Rhode Island, U.S.	Won vacant WBC Youth middleweight title
13	Win	13–0	Brett Lally	TKO	4 (8)	Aug 1, 2003	Casino Ballroom, Hampton Beach, New Hampshire, U.S.	
12	Win	12–0	Earl Allen	TKO	3 (6), 2:59	May 2, 2003	Foxwoods Resort Casino, Ledyard, Connecticut, U.S.	
11	Win	11–0	Willie Lee	KO	3 (6), 2:38	Mar 21, 2003	Foxwoods Resort Casino, Ledyard, Connecticut, U.S.	
10	Win	10–0	Shannon Miller	UD	6	Feb 1, 2003	Mohegan Sun Arena, Montville, Connecticut, U.S.	
9	Win	9–0	John Romans William	TKO	4 (6)	Oct 25, 2002	Foxwoods Resort Casino, Ledyard, Connecticut, U.S.	
8	Win	8–0	Faustino Gonzalez	UD	6	Aug 3, 2002	Foxwoods Resort Casino, Ledyard, Connecticut, U.S.	
7	Win	7–0	Gary Grant	TKO	1 (4), 1:36	May 18, 2002	Mohegan Sun Arena, Montville, Connecticut, U.S.	
6	Win	6–0	Chad Sawyer	UD	4	Apr 27, 2002	Mohegan Sun Arena, Montville, Connecticut, U.S.	
5	Win	5–0	Martin Desjardins	UD	4	Mar 1, 2002	Foxwoods Resort Casino, Ledyard, Connecticut, U.S.	
4	Win	4–0	Jerald Lowe	TKO	1 (4), 2:56	Feb 16, 2002	Mohegan Sun Arena, Montville, Connecticut, U.S.	
3	Win	3–0	James Orso	KO	1 (4), 1:58	Dec 13, 2001	Mohegan Sun Arena, Montville, Connecticut, U.S.	
2	Win	2–0	Antonio Baker	KO	1 (4), 0:43	Sep 21, 2001	Rhodes-on-the Pawtuxet, Cranston, Rhode Island, U.S.	
1	Win	1–0	Steve Garrett	TKO	2 (4), 1:46	Aug 18, 2001	Mohegan Sun Arena, Montville, Connecticut, U.S.	

== See also ==
- List of light heavyweight boxing champions
- List of WBC world champions
- List of IBO world champions
- List of The Ring world champions

Sporting positions
Regional boxing titles
Vacant Title last held by Stephan Trabant	WBC Youth middleweight champion October 31, 2003 – August 2005; Vacated	Vacant Title next held by Grzegorz Proksa
Vacant Title last held by Librado Andrade	NABO super middleweight champion November 18, 2005 – February 2006; Vacated	Vacant Title next held by Jean Pascal
Preceded by Eric Harding	NABF light heavyweight champion June 2, 2006 – February 2007; Vacated	Vacant Title next held by Chris Henry
Vacant Title last held by Vyacheslav Shabranskyy	WBC–USNBC light heavyweight champion October 11, 2019 – present	Incumbent
Minor world boxing titles
Preceded by Antonio Tarver	IBO light heavyweight champion October 11, 2008 – August 14, 2010	Succeeded by Jean Pascal
Major world boxing titles
Preceded by Tomasz Adamek	WBC light heavyweight champion February 3, 2007 – July 11, 2008; Vacated	Succeeded by Adrian Diaconu promoted from interim status
Preceded by Antonio Tarver	IBF light heavyweight champion October 11, 2008 – May 27, 2009; Vacated	Vacant Title next held by Tavoris Cloud
Vacant Title last held by Adrian Diaconu	WBC light heavyweight champion Interim title November 7, 2009 – August 14, 2010; Failed to win full title	Vacant Title next held by Oleksandr Gvozdyk
Preceded by Bernard Hopkins	WBC light heavyweight champion April 29, 2012 – June 8, 2013	Succeeded by Adonis Stevenson
Preceded by Bernard Hopkins	The Ring light heavyweight champion April 29, 2012 – June 8, 2013	Succeeded by Adonis Stevenson
