= The Charlos vs. Derevyanchenko and Rosario =

Boxing event

The Charlos vs. Derevyanchenko and Rosario, also known as the Charlo Doubleheader VIII, was the eighth series of fights which involved both the Charlo twins (Jermell and Jermall) respectively. The event took place on September 26, 2020, at the Mohegan Sun Arena, Uncasville, Connecticut.

== Background ==
On 22 July 2020, Showtime announced a PPV double-header featuring the Charlo twins, with undefeated WBC middleweight champion Jermall Charlo facing three-time world title challenger Sergiy Derevyanchenko and a light middleweight unification bout between WBC champion Jermell Charlo and unified WBA and IBF champion Jeison Rosario. Due to COVID-19 restrictions the event was held without fans in attendance.

== The fights ==
=== Charlo vs. Derevyanchenko ===
Jermall Charlo vs. Sergiy Derevyanchenko
- Date: September 26, 2020
- Venue: Mohegan Sun Arena, Uncasville, Connecticut
- Title(s) on the line: WBC middleweight title

Tale of the tape
Boxer	(United States) Jermall Charlo	(Ukraine) Sergiy Derevyanchenko
Nickname	"Hitman"	"The Technician"
Hometown	Houston, Texas	Mykolaiv, Mykolaiv Oblast
Pre-fight record	30–0 (22 KO)	13–2 (10 KO)
Age	30 years, 4 months	34 years, 10 months
Height	6 ft 0 in (183 cm)	5 ft 9 in (175 cm)
Weight	159.8 lb (72 kg)	159.4 lb (72 kg)
Style	Orthodox	Orthodox
Recognition	WBC; Middleweight Champion; The Ring; No. 3 Ranked Middleweight; TBRB; No. 4 Ranked Middleweight; 2-division world champion	WBC; No. 1 Ranked Middleweight; TBRB; No. 3 Ranked Middleweight; The Ring; No. 4 Ranked Middleweight

Result
- Charlo wins via unanimous decision

The main event of the first card saw Jermall Charlo defend his middleweight belt against number one contender Sergiy Derevyanchenko.

Derevyanchenko was making his third attempt to win a world title, having lost a split decision against Daniel Jacobs in October 2018 and a competitive unanimous decision against Gennady Golovkin in October 2019.

On July 22, 2020 it was announced that the Charlo twins would co-headline a Showtime PPV. The card was scheduled to take place on September 26 at the Mohegan Sun Arena in Uncasville, Connecticut. Charlo would defend his WBC title against his toughest opponent to date, WBC #1 and The Ring #4 ranked Sergiy Derevyanchenko (13-2, 10 KOs). Derevyanchenko declined a lucrative offer to fight Saul Álvarez on September 12 at super middleweight, in order to challenge Charlo. For this card, it was revealed that Jermell would main event. Charlo wanted to cement his status as a top middleweight. The way he wanted to do this was by getting a stoppage win over Derevyanchenko. He had previously been dropped by Golovkin and Daniel Jacobs but took them both the distance, losing close decisions. At the press conference, Charlo said, “It would definitely deliver a statement to the world of boxing, to let them know that, yeah, the power’s for real and I can get in there with just about anybody.” Derevyanchenko believed his experience and skill level would be too much for Charlo and give him a win. He told reporters to expect a similar game plan and fight he gave to Golovkin. Both made weight with Charlo coming in at 159¾ pounds and Derevyanchenko weighing 159½ pounds.

==== The fight ====
Charlo would utilize his superior height and reach, and powerful jab to box effectively at the start of the bout, shaking the challenger late in the third with an overhand right. Derevyanchenko would grow into the bout in the middle rounds, being to close the distance and steadily land punches with both hands. Going to the body with left and landing right hands over the top. Although both boxers to would land many hard punches but Charlo's punches were usually more accurate, bruising Derevyanchenko's face and causing blood to flow from his left eye. Derevyanchenko would nevertheless keep coming forward and backing the champion along the ropes.

At the end of 12 rounds Charlo would score a unanimous decision victory, with scores of 116–112, 117–111, 118–110. Compubox showed that Charlo landed 219 of 627 punches thrown (34.9%) and Derevyanchenko landed 180 punches of 681 thrown (26.4%). This was the most that any opponent had landed on Charlo in his career.

==== Aftermath ====
Speaking after bout Charlo said "I made my team proud and I did what I was supposed to do, I executed the game plan. Ronnie Shields told me that I passed the test tonight. I'm happy to go back to the drawing board now and figure out what's next. He was tough, but I knew he was going to be tough. I knew he'd come to fight, I just didn't know how and when he'd try to turn it up. I felt like I never really let him turn it up and that was the game plan. I studied well and I didn't let the pandemic affect my training. I just want to keep fighting and not let any negative interrupt the positive."

Preceded by vs. Dennis Hogan	Jermall Charlo's bouts 26 September 2020	Succeeded by vs. Juan Macias Montiel
Preceded by vs. Gennady Golovkin	Sergiy Derevyanchenko's bouts 26 September 2020	Succeeded by vs. Carlos Adames

=== Charlo vs. Rosario ===
Jermell Charlo vs. Jeison Rosario
- Title(s) on the line: WBA (Super), WBC, IBF and vacant The Ring light middleweight titles

Tale of the tape
Boxer	(United States) Jermell Charlo	(Dominican Republic) Jeison Rosario
Nickname	"Iron Man"	"El Banana"
Hometown	Houston, Texas	Santo Domingo, Distrito Nacional
Pre-fight record	33–1 (17 KO)	20–1 (14 KOs)
Age	30 years, 4 months	25 years, 5 months
Height	5 ft 11 in (180 cm)	5 ft 11 in (180 cm)
Weight	153.8 lb (70 kg)	153.4 lb (70 kg)
Style	Orthodox	Orthodox
Recognition	WBC; Light Middleweight Champion; The Ring; No. 1 Ranked Light Middleweight; TBRB; No. 4 Ranked Light Middleweight	WBA (Super) and IBF; Light Middleweight Champion; TBRB; No. 1 Ranked Light Middleweight; The Ring; No. 2 Ranked Light Middleweight

Result
- Jermell wins via 8th-round knockout

The final bout saw Jermell Charlo face Jeison Rosario, with 3 of 4 155 lb titles on the line, plus the vacant The Ring belt. In case any boxer had to pull out of the contest or tested positive for COVID, Bakhram Murtazaliev (17-0, 13 KOs), IBF’s mandatory challenger, who was scheduled to fight on the non-televised portion of the undercard, was on standby to step in. During virtual workouts, Charlo spoke to PBC's Ray Flores. Charlo was aiming to finish the fight inside the distance and not wanting the judges to decide the outcome. As the last time Charlo went the distance, he lost a controversial decision, although he gained revenge on Harrison. For the fight, Charlo was a 4-1 favorite. At the weigh in, Charlo came in at 153¾ pounds and Rosario officially weighed 153½ pounds.

==== The fight ====
Charlo unified the WBC, WBA & IBF world title, knocking out Rosario in eight rounds. Charlo would start quickly, dropping Rosario with a left hook to the top of the head in the first round. In the next few rounds Rosario managed to outwork Charlo with a series of attacks to the body, keeping Charlo on his back foot. Near the end of the sixth however, another left hook had Rosario down again. This time, he was badly hurt and was saved by the bell. Rosario was knocked down for the third time with a left jab in the eight round and was unable to beat the count, giving Charlo the knockout victory. At the time of stoppage, Charlo was ahead 67-64, 67-64 & 66-65 on the cards. According to Compubox, Charlo landed 64 of 242 punches thrown (26.4%), with Rosario out landing him, connecting 85 of his 367 thrown (23.2%).

==== Aftermath ====
Speaking after the bout Charlo said "I definitely proved that I'm more than just a puncher, but I also showed again that I'm a big puncher. I'd give myself an A tonight, I stuck to my game plan and listened to my coach. Everything we did in camp, I used it in this fight. I pushed myself the whole way through training camp. It's been a journey for me. I'm bringing the straps home to my family like they told me to."

Preceded by vs. Tony Harrison II	Jermell Charlo's bouts 26 September 2020	Succeeded by vs. Brian Castaño
Preceded by vs. Julian Williams	Jeison Rosario's bouts 26 September 2020	Succeeded by vs. Erickson Lubin

== PPV price and reception ==
The PPV was priced at $74.95. Some felt the price mark was too high considering the twin brothers star attraction and that it was there first PPV. Some felt it was too high considering the pandemic, but at the same time, the cost would cover anyone who would have purchased tickets as there was to be no fans in attendance.

The event was reported to have generated around 120,000 PPV buys.

== Fight card ==
Confirmed bouts:

Weight Class	Weight Limit		vs.		Method	Round	Time	Notes
Main card 2
Light middleweight	154 lbs.	(United States) Jermell Charlo (c)	def.	(Dominican Republic) Jeison Rosario (c)	KO	8 (12)	:21	^{Note 5}
Super bantamweight	122 lbs.	(Mexico) Luis Nery	def.	(Mexico) Aarón Alameda	UD	12		^{Note 4}
Super bantamweight	122 lbs.	(United States) Daniel Roman	def.	(Dominican Republic) Juan Carlos Payano	UD	12
Main card 1
Middleweight	160 lbs.	(United States) Jermall Charlo (c)	def.	(Ukraine) Sergiy Derevyanchenko	UD	12		^{Note 3}
Super bantamweight	122 lbs.	(United States) Brandon Figueroa (c)	def.	(United States) Damien Vazquez	TKO	10 (12)	1:18	^{Note 2}
Bantamweight	118 lbs.	(Philippines) Johnriel Casimero (c)	def.	(Ghana) Duke Micah	TKO	3 (12)	:54	^{Note 1}
Under card
Light middleweight	154 lbs.	(Russia) Bakhram Murtazaliev	def.	(United States) Manny Woods	RTD	4 (10)	3:00

^Note 1 For WBO Bantamweight title ^Note 2 For WBA Super bantamweight title ^Note 3 For WBC middleweight title ^Note 4 vacant WBC Super bantamweight title ^Note 5 For unified WBA (Super), WBC, and IBF light middleweight titles

== Broadcasting ==
The fight was televised live in the USA on Showtime PPV, Latin America (inc. Dominican Republic) on ESPN, and streamed live in Ukraine on XSPORT.

Country	Broadcaster			
Country	Free-to-air	Cable/Pay TV	PPV	Stream
United States (host)	—N/a		Showtime	
Ukraine	—N/a			XSPORT
Latin America: Argentina; Bolivia; Brazil; Chile; Colombia; Costa Rica; Dominican Republic; Ecuador; El Salvador; Guatemala; Honduras; Mexico; Nicaragua; Panama; Paraguay; Peru; Uruguay; Venezuela	—N/a	ESPN	—N/a	ESPNPlayer
International (unsold markets)	—N/a		FITE TV	
Australia	—N/a	Fox Sports	—N/a	Foxtel Now
Australia	—N/a	Fox Sports	—N/a	Kayo Sports
France	—N/a	RMC Sport	—N/a	RMC Sport
Indonesia	tvOne	—N/a		
Japan	—N/a	Wowow	—N/a	Wowow
Kazakhstan	Khabar	—N/a		Khabar
Poland	TVP Sport	—N/a		TVP Stream
Russia	Match TV			
Turkey	—N/a			S Sport+
