= Yoelvis Gomez =

Cuban boxer

Personal information
- Nickname: La Joya
- Nationality: Cuban
- Born: 24 September 1997 (age 28) Havana, Cuba
- Height: 5 ft (152 cm) 10
- Weight: Middleweight

Boxing career
- Stance: Southpaw

Boxing record
- Total fights: 9
- Wins: 8
- Win by KO: 7
- Losses: 1

Yoelvis Gomez (born 24 September 1997) is a Cuban professional boxer who currently competes in the middleweight division.

== Amateur career ==
Gomez was inspired to box by his father Jose Gomez Mustelier who was also a fighter. He had a prolific amateur record of 207 wins and 35 losses.

== Professional career ==
=== Gomez vs Cota ===
After needing just 7 rounds to win the first 5 fights of his career Gomez was forced to go the distance for the first time against former contender Jorge Cota. Despite not getting a stoppage Gomez won every round on all three judges scorecards. The only good shot Cota landed was on the referee in round four.

=== Gomez vs Taylor ===
Gomez suffered a huge upset against American Marquis Taylor. Despite being a heavy favourite and causing a cut above the eye of Taylor early on, Gomez was dropped in the second round and lost on all three judges scorecards.

== Professional boxing record ==
9 fights	8 wins	1 loss
By knockout	7	0
By decision	1	1

No.	Result	Record	Opponent	Type	Round, time	Date	Location	Notes
9	Win	8-1	(Brazil) Diego Allan Ferreira Iablonski	RTD	4 (8), 3:00	6 Sep 2024	(United States) Vertu Motors Arena, Newcastle, Florida, U.S.	
8	Win	7-1	(Argentina) Marcelo Fabian Bzowski	TKO	6 (8), 2:44	8 Jun 2024	(United States) Caribe Royale Orlando, Orlando, Florida, U.S.	
7	Loss	7–0	(United States) Marquis Taylor	UD	10	8 Jul 2023	(United States) The Ballroom, Boardwalk Hall, Atlantic City, New Jersey, U.S.	
6	Win	6–0	(Mexico) Jorge Cota	UD	10	21 May 2022	(United States) Gila River Arena, Glendale, Arizona, U.S.	
5	Win	5–0	(United States) Clay Collard	TKO	1 (6), 2:11	25 Dec 2021	(United States) Prudential Center, Newark, New Jersey, U.S.	
4	Win	4–0	(Mexico) Jesus Pina Najera	KO	1 (6), 0:35	3 Apr 2021	Polideportivo Centenario, Los Mochis, Mexico	
3	Win	3–0	(Mexico) David Rangel	TKO	3 (6), 0:31	10 Dec 2020	Marinaterra Hotel Spa, San Carlos, Mexico	
2	Win	2–0	(Mexico) Edgar Alvarez Garcia	KO	1 (4), 1:19	12 Sep 2020	Krasiba, Lerma, Mexico	
1	Win	1–0	(Guatemala) Manuel Mendez	KO	1 (4) 2:50	31 Aug 2019	GImnasio House Of Champions, Guatemala City, Guatemala	
