= Jarrett Hurd =

American boxer (born 1990)

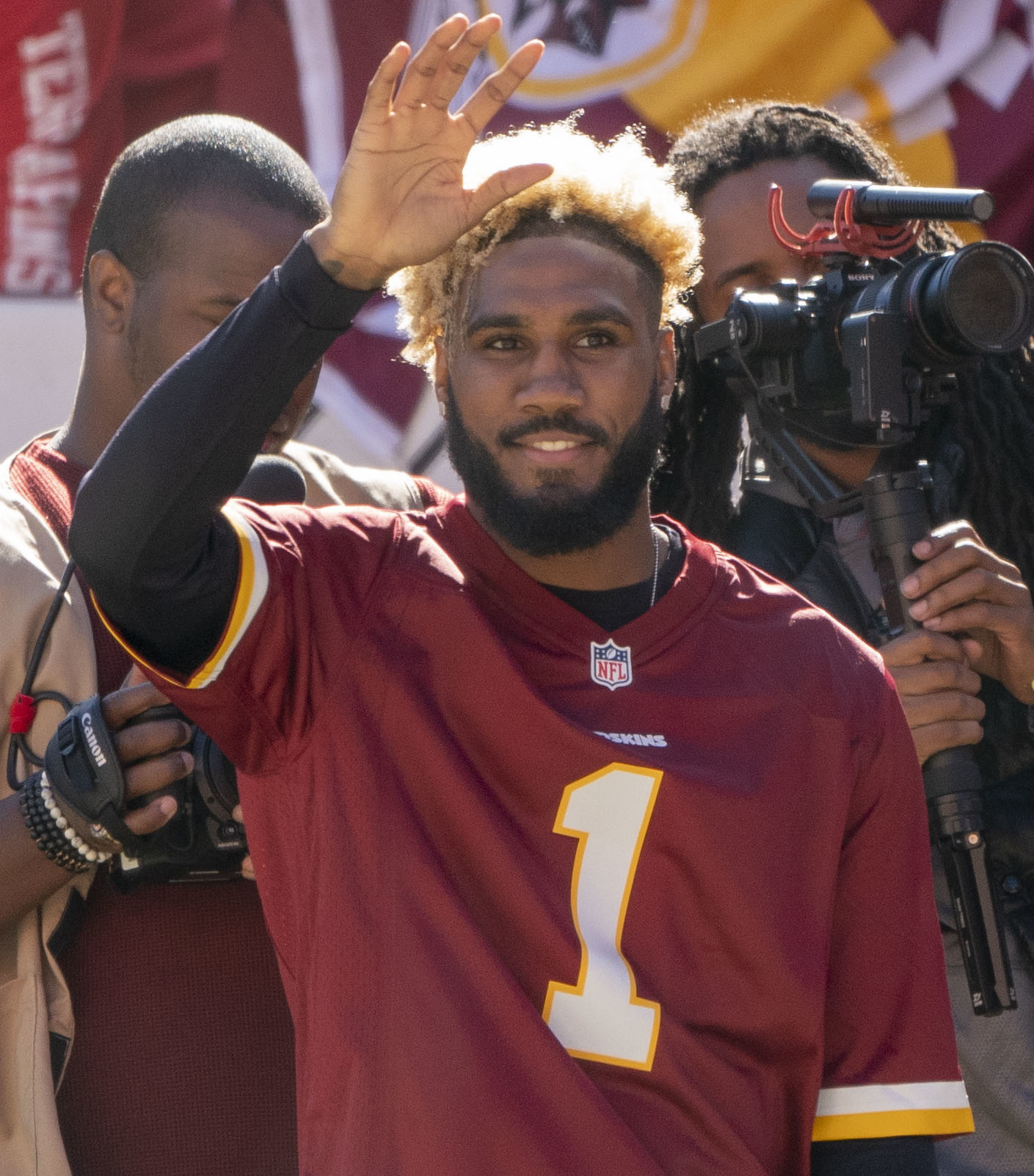
- Hurd at FedExField in 2018

Personal information
- Nickname: Swift
- Born: August 31, 1990 (age 35) Accokeek, Maryland, U.S.
- Height: 5 ft 11 1/2 in (182 cm)
- Weight: Light middleweight

Boxing career
- Reach: 78 in (198 cm)
- Stance: Orthodox

Boxing record
- Total fights: 30
- Wins: 25
- Win by KO: 17
- Losses: 4
- Draws: 1

Jarrett Hurd (born August 31, 1990) is a former American professional boxer. He was the unified light middleweight world champion, having held the WBA (Super), IBF and IBO titles between 2017 and 2019. In September 2019, Hurd was ranked as the world's second best active light middleweight by The Ring magazine, fourth best by the Transnational Boxing Rankings Board, and sixth by BoxRec.

== Amateur career ==
Hurd was raised in the suburbs of Accokeek, Maryland, and graduated from Gwynn Park High School. He wasn't a stand-out amateur, only compiling a 32–8 record in 40 amateur fights.

== Professional career ==
=== Early career ===
Despite Hurd's lack of accolades as an amateur, Ross Molovinsky, head of Washington metropolitan area promotional outfit Keystone Boxing, tapped him as a potential prospect. Hurd made his pro debut in September 2012. After winning his first 16 fights, Hurd made his TV debut on ShoBox: The New Generation against fellow unbeaten prospect Frank Galarza. Hurd started off slow, however after round 2, outclassed Galarza, who was unable to cope with Hurd's jab and movement. After six lopsided rounds, the referee stopped the fight, giving Hurd a TKO win. Showtime analyst Steve Farhood praised Hurd's performance.

On May 19, 2016, it was announced that Hurd would appear on the Keith Thurman vs. Shawn Porter undercard at the Barclays Center in Brooklyn New York on June 25 against former Olympian Óscar Molina in a 10-round bout. The fight was initially on the non-televised undercard, until three days before the fight, it was bumped up to open the broadcast on CBS. The reason Hurd's fight was bumped up was due to the Jesús Cuellar vs. Abner Mares was cancelled after Mares suffered an eye injury. Hurd defeated Molina with a round 10 TKO. Hurd dropped Molina in the first round with an uppercut. The last round stoppage was considered premature by some media members. Before round 10, the three judges' had their scorecards reading 87–83, 88–82, 90–80 in favor of Hurd.

Hurd was scheduled to fight Jorge Cota in November 2016, but Cota dropped out after undergoing an emergency appendectomy and was replaced by Jo Jo Dan (35-3, 18 KOs). The bout took place on November 12 at Temple University's Liacouras Center in Philadelphia. Hurd won the fight with a round 6 TKO, overwhelming Dan with crisp combinations. After the fight, Dan said "The weight was a big difference, I took the fight on short notice, but I'm a natural 147-pounder and I don't struggle to make that."

=== IBF light middleweight champion ===
==== Hurd vs Harrison ====
On January 24, 2017, it was announced that Hurd would next fight on Deontay Wilder's undercard on February 25 at the Legacy Arena in Birmingham, Alabama, against Tony Harrison (24-1, 20 KOs) on PBC on FOX. The fight was originally supposed to be an IBF title eliminator for the right to fight Jermall Charlo, but when Charlo vacated the title, the fight was elevated to be for the vacant title. Hurd defeated Harrison to win the vacant IBF light middleweight title. Hurd struggled at the start of the fight, being outboxed in the early rounds. As the fight went on, Harrison seemed to struggle coping with Hurd's power. Harrison was knocked down by a right hook, he got up but was unable to continue. After the fight, Hurd said "We wanted to take our time with him because Harrison can box and move, but every time he fights, he wears down toward the end." Both boxers earned a $125,000 purse.

==== Hurd vs Trout ====
On May 31, 2017, The Ring TV announced a deal was in place for Hurd to face former world champion Austin Trout for his first defense. The fight was scheduled for July 29 on the undercard of Mikey Garcia vs. Adrien Broner in New York. On July 20, Boxing Scene reported the fight was being lined up to take place on September 30, 2017, as part of a light middleweight double header alongside Jermell Charlo's WBC title defence against Erickson Lubin. Because Hurd was granted an exception from the IBF to make a voluntary defence the winner must fight mandatory challenger Cédric Vitu next. On August 24, it was announced that the fight would take place as part of a junior middleweight triple-header at the Barclays Center on 14 October 2017. On fight night, Trout started the fight well, winning the early rounds by jabbing and moving. However, during the third round, Hurd seemed to hurt Trout with some power shots. In the middle rounds, Hurd was able to stifle Trout's movement, making the fight more of a brawl, with both fighters trading power shots. Hurd seemed unfazed by Trout's punches, even though he seemed to tire during round 7. On the other hand, Trout was visibly backed up several times by Hurd's shots. Hurd was cut from a head clash during round 7, while Trout's right eye started swelling. Hurd backed up Trout once again towards the end of round 10. Trout's cornermen retired following round 10 to protect their fighter, to the chagrin of the former world champion. The announced attendance was 7,643. For the fight, Hurd earned $330,000, while Trout, who was stopped inside the distance for the first time since turning professional, was paid $225,000. In the action packed fight, Hurd landed 265 of 753 punches (35%) and Trout landed 208 of his 673 thrown (31%).

=== Unified light middleweight champion ===
==== Hurd vs Lara ====
On January 9, 2018, it was confirmed that a deal was being put in place for a unification fight between Hurd and WBA (Super) and IBO champion Erislandy Lara (25-2-2, 14 KOs) for April 2018 with Showtime televising the bout. On January 25, the fight was confirmed to take place on April 7. It was reported Lara would receive a large purse of $1 million and Hurd would receive a $500,000 purse. Lara weighed 153.5 pounds and Hurd came in slightly lighter at 153 pounds. Hurd won a 12-round split decision over Lara in what was a potential fight of a year candidate to become a unified light middleweight champion. With the fight in the balance, Hurd knocked Lara down with a short left hook in round 12 with a minute remaining. Lara was hurt from the knockdown, but was able to get up and still throw some nice shots. Hurd dominated the final round. Two judges scored the fight 114-113 for Hurd and the third judge had the same score for Lara, meaning the knockdown was the deciding factor in the fight. A lot of rounds where close with Lara using effective counter punching and combinations, whereas Hurd used his size to stalk Lara and land power shots. Lara's right eye began to swell from round 7 and was eventually cut at the start of round 12. Lara started the fight the better boxer of the two, due to Hurd not putting as much pressure on Lara until the later rounds. With the win, Hurd became seventh unified world title holder in light middleweight history, joining Hall of Famers Terry Norris, Félix Trinidad, Oscar De La Hoya and Winky Wright, as well as Floyd Mayweather Jr. and Canelo Álvarez.

Despite the knockdown, Lara thought he had a good enough lead to win the fight. Had Lara not been knocked down, the fight would have finished a majority draw with both boxers keeping their respective belts. In regards to the decision, Lara said, "Besides the last round, I thought I was winning this fight easily. That's not to decide the fight. One punch in a fight doesn't determine the fight. One hundred percent I want the rematch. The problem was the cut on the eye. I couldn't see in the last round." After the fight, Hurd said, "It was a tough one, but I went out there and did exactly what I said I was going to do -- fight all 12 rounds and get the victory. I didn't feel like that [12th-round knockdown for the win]. I feel like I was in control the whole fight, applying the pressure." According to CompuBox statistics, Hurd landed 217 of 824 punches thrown (26%) and Lara landed 176 of his 572 thrown (31%). Hurd outlanded Lara 106–71 in the final four rounds, with 96 being power shots compared to Lara's 58 power punches. The fight, televised on Showtime, averaged 490,000 viewers and peaked at 521,000 viewers.

Although the WBA ordered a direct rematch between Lara and Hurd, the latter rejected the idea stating he wanted to move on to bigger fights to become undisputed light middleweight champion.

==== Hurd vs. Welborn ====
In June 2018, Hurd underwent surgery on his shoulder, which he revealed was injured prior to his unification bout against Lara in April. In August, Hurd's trainer Ernesto Rodriguez stated the shoulder was healing well and he would look to return to the ring in November 2018. In October, it was announced that Hurd would return on the undercard of Deontay Wilder vs. Tyson Fury at the Staples Center in Los Angeles, California. His opponent was later confirmed to be British boxer Jason Welborn (24-6, 7 KOs), who would be dropping back down to light middleweight for the first time since 2016. Hurd weighed 152 1/2 pounds and his opponent Welborn came in at 152 1/2 pounds. For the fight, Hurd earned his first ever $1 million purse and Welborn would take home a $30,000 purse.

Hurd knocked Welborn out in round 4 to retain his light middleweight titles. Welborn started to attack Hurd from the opening bell, pinning him against the ropes many times. Hurd looked hurt a couple of times during the short fight. Hurd, who was usually a slow starter, became more active in round 3. In the beginning of round 4, Welborn came out again landed shot whilst Hurd again against the ropes was taking head shots. Hurd managed to move away from the ropes and started trading back eventually landing a hard body shot which dropped Welborn. Welborn stayed down too long, and barely beat the count. However, the referee Lou Moret halted the fight due to Welborn taking too long getting up. The official time of stoppage was 1 minute and 56 seconds of round 4. During Hurd's post-fight interview with Showtime reporter Jim Gray, WBC champion Jermell Charlo entered the ring claiming a fight with Hurd would be 'easy money' and he was ready to fight him next. Speaking off his recent shoulder surgery and how the fight went, Hurd said, "I'm just coming of surgery so I wanted to see how I worked off the jab. I felt good I was working behind the jab.I got caught with some shots and said, 'That's enough. He got enough TV time.' I heard the crowd and I didn't want to get brave, so I turned it up and got the knockdown." Hurd stated he would call the shots in the negotiations against Charlo.

==== Hurd vs. Williams ====
Hurd's next defence came on May 11, 2019, against Julian Wililams. Williams was ranked #1 by the IBF and #4 by the WBA at light middleweight. In what was a Fight of the Year candidate, both fighters came out aggressively. Williams managed to get the better out of Hurd, dropping him once in the second round, and outboxing Hurd on numerous occasions. All three judges saw Williams as the clear winner, scoring the fight 116–111, 115–112 and 115–112 to hand Hurd the first defeat of his professional career.

=== Post world title ===
==== Hurd vs. Santana ====
In his comeback fight on January 25, 2020, Hurd fought Francisco Santana. The fight revealed a changed Hurd, who fought more on the outside than on the inside. Hurd dominated the fight in every aspect, as he also managed to drop his opponent in the final round en route to a unanimous decision victory.

==== Hurd vs. Arias ====
On June 6, 2021, Hurd faced Luis Arias on the undercard of Floyd Mayweather Jr. vs Logan Paul. Hurd knocked his opponent down in the ninth round, but lost the bout by split decision with scores of 95–94 in favor of Hurd, and 97–93, 96–93 in favor of Arias.

==== Hurd vs. Gonzalez ====
Hurd faced Johan Gonzalez on March 1, 2025 at Barclays Center in Brooklyn. He lost via split decision and subsequently announced his retirement from professional boxing.

== Professional boxing record ==
30 fights	25 wins	4 losses
By knockout	17	1
By decision	8	3
Draws	1	

No.	Result	Record	Opponent	Type	Round, time	Date	Location	Notes
30	Loss	25–4–1	Johan Gonzalez	SD	10	Mar 1, 2025	Barclays Center, New York City, New York U.S.	
29	Draw	25–3–1	Jeison Rosario	SD	10	Aug 21, 2024	ProBox TV Events Center, Plant City, Florida, U.S.	
28	Win	25–3	Tyi Edmonds	RTD	4 (8), 3:00	Dec 8, 2023	Wind Creek Bethlehem, Bethlehem, Pennsylvania, U.S.	
27	Loss	24–3	José Armando Reséndiz	TKO	10 (10), 0:05	Mar 4, 2023	Toyota Arena, Ontario, California, U.S.	
26	Loss	24–2	Luis Arias	SD	10	Jun 6, 2021	Hard Rock Stadium, Miami, Florida, U.S.	
25	Win	24–1	Francisco Santana	UD	10	Jan 25, 2020	Barclays Center, New York City, New York, U.S.	
24	Loss	23–1	Julian Williams	UD	12	May 11, 2019	EagleBank Arena, Fairfax, Virginia, U.S.	Lost WBA (Super), IBF, and IBO light middleweight titles
23	Win	23–0	Jason Welborn	KO	4 (12), 1:55	Dec 1, 2018	Staples Center, Los Angeles, California, U.S.	Retained WBA (Super), IBF, and IBO light middleweight titles
22	Win	22–0	Erislandy Lara	SD	12	Apr 7, 2018	The Joint, Paradise, Nevada, U.S.	Retained IBF light middleweight title; Won WBA (Super) and IBO light middleweight titles
21	Win	21–0	Austin Trout	RTD	10 (12), 3:00	Oct 14, 2017	Barclays Center, New York City, New York, U.S.	Retained IBF light middleweight title
20	Win	20–0	Tony Harrison	TKO	9 (12), 2:24	Feb 25, 2017	Legacy Arena, Birmingham, Alabama, U.S.	Won vacant IBF light middleweight title
19	Win	19–0	Jo Jo Dan	TKO	6 (10), 1:08	Nov 12, 2016	Liacouras Center, Philadelphia, Pennsylvania, U.S.	
18	Win	18–0	Óscar Molina	TKO	10 (10), 2:02	Jun 25, 2016	Barclays Center, New York City, New York, U.S.	
17	Win	17–0	Frank Galarza	TKO	6 (10), 0:59	Nov 14, 2015	The Joint, Paradise, Nevada, U.S.	
16	Win	16–0	Jeff Lentz	TKO	7 (8), 2:59	Aug 14, 2015	Prudential Center, Newark, New Jersey, U.S.	
15	Win	15–0	Eric Mitchell	TKO	3 (8), 2:07	Apr 18, 2015	Valley Forge Casino Resort, Valley Forge, Pennsylvania, U.S.	
14	Win	14–0	Emmanuel Sanchez	MD	6	Dec 5, 2014	Harrah's Philadelphia, Chester, Pennsylvania, U.S.	
13	Win	13–0	Terry Cade	KO	1 (6), 2:39	Nov 1, 2014	DAR Constitution Hall, Washington, D.C., U.S.	
12	Win	12–0	Joshua Robertson	TKO	1 (6), 1:51	Jun 13, 2014	Rosecroft Raceway, Fort Washington, Maryland, U.S.	
11	Win	11–0	Chris Chatman	SD	6	Jan 17, 2014	Rosecroft Raceway, Fort Washington, Maryland, U.S.	
10	Win	10–0	George Armenta	KO	2 (6), 0:11	Dec 6, 2013	Rosecroft Raceway, Fort Washington, Maryland, U.S.	
9	Win	9–0	Frank Gedeon	UD	6	Oct 18, 2013	Rosecroft Raceway, Fort Washington, Maryland, U.S.	
8	Win	8–0	Issa Coulibaly	KO	3 (4), 1:59	Aug 10, 2013	Convention Center, Washington D.C., U.S.	
7	Win	7–0	Joshua Burns	TKO	2 (6), 2:39	Jul 13, 2013	Rosecroft Raceway, Fort Washington, Maryland, U.S.	
6	Win	6–0	Greg Hackett	UD	6	Apr 20, 2013	The Show Place Arena, Upper Marlboro, Maryland, U.S.	
5	Win	5–0	Thomas Baldwin	UD	4	Mar 2, 2013	Rosecroft Raceway, Fort Washington, Maryland, U.S.	
4	Win	4–0	Trenton Titsworth	UD	4	Jan 13, 2013	Rosecroft Raceway, Fort Washington, Maryland, U.S.	
3	Win	3–0	Anthony Jones	KO	1 (4), 1:09	Dec 8, 2012	Convention Center, Washington D.C., U.S.	
2	Win	2–0	Coy Lanbert	KO	4 (4), 2:08	Nov 3, 2012	Convention Center, Washington D.C., U.S.	
1	Win	1–0	Mike Arnold	TKO	1 (4), 1:30	Sep 29, 2012	Convention Center, Washington, D.C., U.S.	

== See also ==
- List of light-middleweight boxing champions

Sporting positions
Minor world boxing titles
Preceded by Erislandy Lara	IBO light middleweight champion April 7, 2018 – May 11, 2019	Succeeded by Julian Williams
Major world boxing titles
Vacant Title last held by Jermall Charlo	IBF light middleweight champion February 25, 2017 – May 11, 2019	Succeeded by Julian Williams
Preceded by Erislandy Lara	WBA light middleweight champion Super title April 7, 2018 – May 11, 2019	Succeeded by Julian Williams
Awards
Previous: Jermell Charlo	PBC Fighter of the Year; 2018	Incumbent
Previous: Anthony Joshua vs. Wladimir Klitschko	BWAA Fight of the Year vs. Erislandy Lara; 2018	Incumbent
Previous: Anthony Joshua vs. Wladimir Klitschko	ESPN Fight of the Year vs. Erislandy Lara; 2018	Incumbent
