= Erislandy Lara =

Cuban world champion boxer (b. 1983)

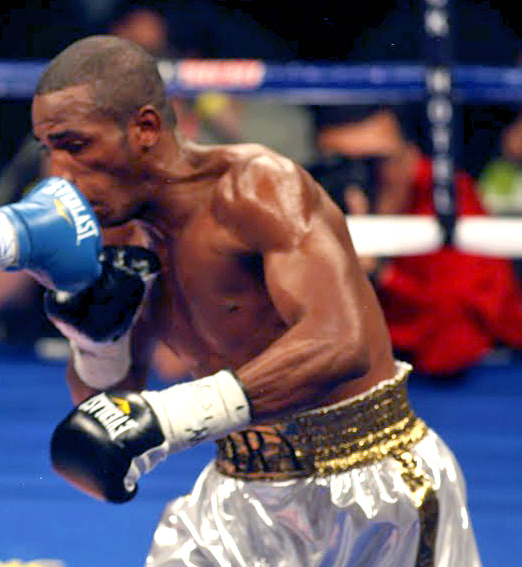
- Lara vs. Brewer, 2010

Personal information
- Nicknames: El Oro de Guantanamo; The American Dream
- Citizenship: Cuba (until 2017); United States (since 2017)
- Born: Erislandy Lara Santoya; 11 April 1983 (age 43) Guantanamo, Cuba
- Height: 5 ft 9 in (175 cm)
- Weight: Light middleweight; Middleweight

Boxing career
- Reach: 75 1/2 in (192 cm)
- Stance: Southpaw

Boxing record
- Total fights: 38
- Wins: 32
- Win by KO: 19
- Losses: 3
- Draws: 3
Medal record
Men's amateur boxing
Representing Cuba
World Championships
Gold medal – first place	2005 Mianyang	Welterweight
Central American and Caribbean Games
Gold medal – first place	2006 Cartagena	Welterweight
World Cup
Silver medal – second place	2005 Moscow	Welterweight

Erislandy Lara Santoya (born 11 April 1983) is a Cuban-American professional boxer. He has held multiple world championships in two weight classes, including the World Boxing Association (WBA) middleweight title since 2023 (Regular version from 2021 to 2023). Previously he held the WBA super welterweight title (Regular and Super versions) between 2014 and 2021.

In a career lasting over 16 years, Lara has long been regarded as one of the world's most technically skilled boxers. He was captain of the Cuban national amateur team, winning a welterweight gold medal at the 2005 World Championships as well as three consecutive Cuban national championships from 2005 to 2007.

== Amateur career ==
In 2003 and 2004, Lara lost four times against two-time world champion Lorenzo Aragón.

In 2005 after Aragon stepped down, Lara bested his countryman Yudel Jhonson Cedeno repeatedly and was sent to the world championships. There he avenged an earlier loss to Russian Andrey Balanov, beat American Boyd Melson, upset top favorite and Olympic champion Bakhtiyar Artayev (31–22), and won Gold against Magomed Nurutdinov (BLR).

Lara has lost twice to another Kazakh, Bakhyt Sarsekbayev. In their only meeting, Lara beat American world champion Demetrius Andrade 9–4.

=== Highlights ===
Boxing World Cup results 2005

  - Defeated Manon Boonjumnong (Thailand) 21–9
  - Defeated Stefan Dragomir (Romania) RSC–3
  - Defeated Bakhyt Sarsekbayev (Kazakhstan) 39–33
  - Lost to Andrey Balanov (Russia) 21–36

== Defection ==
Lara was considered a favorite to win the gold medal at the 2008 Beijing Olympic Games. However, in 2007, Lara and Guillermo Rigondeaux defected from Cuba during the Pan American Games in Rio de Janeiro, Brazil. Some weeks later, he was caught by Brazilian authorities and returned to Cuba where he was banned from practicing boxing indefinitely.

In 2008, Lara attempted a second defection, this time on a speed boat to Mexico. Lara was successful and made his way to Hamburg, Germany, where he joined former Olympic champions Odlanier Solis, Yan Bartelemí, and Yuriorkis Gamboa in the Arena Box-Promotion stable.

== Professional career ==
=== Early career ===
On 1 January 2009, Lara made his ESPN debut and scored a first-round Technical knockout (TKO) against Rodrigo Aguiar. Lara's following fight came on 20 February 2009, against Keith Gross. Lara dropped Gross with a left hand, but Gross beat the count on wobbly legs. Lara continued unleashing combinations to the head and body. A left uppercut finished the fight within round one. On 2 May 2009, on the Pacquiao vs. Hatton undercard, Lara faced Chris Gray. Lara won the fight via unanimous decision. On 22 May 2009, Lara faced aging Edwin Vazquez. Lara finished the fight with good combinations, prompting the referee to stop the fight in round four. On that same night, fellow Cuban boxer Guillermo Rigondeaux made his pro debut, which he also won via referee stoppage in the third round. After beating Edwin Vazquez, Lara went on to win nine straight fights punctuated by four consecutive first-round knockout victories.

=== Rise up the ranks ===
==== Lara vs. Molina, Williams ====
On 25 March 2011, at The Cosmopolitan in Las Vegas, Lara fought Carlos Molina to a ten-round majority draw. Lara started by frequently targeting Molina's body with the left uppercut when Molina would attempt to close the distance. Early on, Molina seemed to predict and nullify much of Lara's attempted one-two combinations. Although Lara had trouble connecting with his signature straight left hand initially, he found the distance by the middle rounds and began to mix in short hooks to the head while blocking most of Molina's constant body work. Molina, on the other hand, was rarely able to find Lara's head throughout the entire fight. Relying on looping punches, Molina stayed close and took advantage of the clinches to land to the body. Visibly fatigued, Molina developed a cut under his left eye near the beginning of the ninth round as Lara landed a hard, clean, straight left hand and pushed the pace. Molina's higher output and pressure were favored by one judge while Lara's cleaner, sharper output and defense went largely unnoticed by ringside commentators. The final scorecards read: 95–95, 95–95, and 97–93 in favor of Molina.

Lara fought former WBO welterweight champion Paul Williams on 9 July 2011, in Atlantic City, New Jersey, where he lost a majority decision. Judges Don Givens (116–114) and Hilton Whitaker II (115–114) both favored Williams, while Al Bennett scored it even at 114–114. Most boxing analysts and fans believed that Lara clearly won the fight and had been unfairly judged. Lara was able to land hard, clean left hands throughout the fight while maintaining superb defense. Williams appeared hurt in the later rounds but did, however, keep up a high output of punches despite their relative ineffectiveness. CompuBox recorded Lara landing 49% of his power punches compared to 21% by Williams. Lara also landed 7 more jabs and 17 more power punches than Williams, despite the near two-fold activity by Williams. Consequently, the New Jersey State Athletic Control Board suspended all three judges, and Lara received his first loss as a professional fighter in a highly controversial fashion.

==== Lara vs. Hearns, Martirosyan ====
On 20 April 2012, Lara made his comeback to the ring after nine months to fight Ronald Hearns for the WBC super welterweight semi-final eliminator spot at the Beau Rivage casino resort in Biloxi, Mississippi. The fight, which was scheduled to go ten rounds, simply lasted one minute and 34 seconds as Lara delivered an impressive TKO in the first round. Referee Keith Hughes decided to stop the fight after Lara had sent Hearns to the canvas with a clean left hook, following the eight-count by the referee, Lara immediately delivered two fast combinations (one of which also required a count) that seemed to be enough to overwhelm Hearns, who seconds before the stoppage appeared to be defenseless upon Lara's final combination.

On 10 November 2012, at the Wynn Resort in Las Vegas, Lara faced Vanes Martirosyan, who was undefeated at the time and known for his amateur wins over Andre Berto, Austin Trout, and Timothy Bradley. Lara connected on 42% of his power punches (40/95) while Martirosyan landed 16% of his (27/167) and only 6 jabs throughout the entire fight, according to CompuBox. Lara outlanded Martirosyan in overall punches, 74 to 33. After a clash of heads resulted in a gash over Martirosyan's left eye in the ninth round, the ringside doctor waved off the fight. The referee ordered the judges to score the final 26 seconds of the bout, which resulted in a technical draw (87–84 in favor of Lara, 86–85 in favor of Martirosyan, and 86–86). Dave Moretti was responsible for the tied scorecard and judged the ninth round as 10–10, disagreeing with the other two judges who scored the final 26 seconds as 10–9 for Lara.

=== WBA light middleweight champion ===
==== Lara vs. Angulo, Trout ====
On 8 June 2013, at the Home Depot Center in Carson, California, Lara received the first two knockdowns of his professional career en route to earning a TKO victory over Mexico's Alfredo Angulo along with the interim WBA super welterweight title. Angulo's left hook was vicious as he rushed in, guarded and low. Lara, in return, was able to utilize zigzag formations and vary the speed of his movement to bait Angulo's aggression. However, Lara struggled with the aggression of Angulo at times and was put on the canvas in rounds 4 and 9 courtesy of Angulo's vaunted left hook. Lara landed 56% of his power punches while Angulo landed 31% of his, according to CompuBox. The fight was stopped in round ten when Angulo refused to continue after a straight left hand by Lara caused swelling around his right eye. Angulo's injury was later revealed to be a broken orbital bone.

On 7 December 2013, Lara fought Austin Trout at Barclays Center in Brooklyn, New York. Considered the favorite to win, Trout had recently beaten Miguel Cotto. Lara, however, put on a dominant performance as he immediately nullified Trout's offense using deft footwork and clean punching. In outclassing Trout, Lara scored a knockdown in round eleven via straight left hand. Trout was hurt for the remainder of the round as Lara pressed the action. Lara cruised to the unanimous decision (117–111, 117–111, and 118–109) and retained his WBA interim super welterweight title.

==== Lara vs. Álvarez ====
Lara fought Canelo Álvarez on 12 July 2014, at the MGM Grand in a non-title match. Lara's WBA super welterweight title was not on the line as the fight took place at a 155-pound catchweight, and both fighters weighed in at precisely 155 pounds. Álvarez rehydrated to 171 pounds while Lara came into the ring at 166 pounds. In a very close and competitive fight that went to a split decision, Álvarez came out on top with two judges scoring 115–113 in favor of each fighter and the final judge scoring 117–111 in favor of Álvarez. The final scorecard was controversial as many observers considered it far too wide. According to CompuBox, Lara landed 55 jabs to nine from Álvarez, who landed the jab at a 5% connect rate. Álvarez managed to land 88 power punches (73 to the body) while Lara landed 53 power punches all to the head. Lara's clean punching along with his defense and movement were weighed against Álvarez's effective aggressiveness. Lara came out in dominant fashion, utilizing a stick-and-move style and capturing the early rounds. Álvarez was later able to hammer away to the body when he had Lara on the ropes but never adjusted to Lara's one-two combinations. Lara's lead hand played a huge role in this combination's effectiveness, but his output dropped in the middle rounds. Álvarez was able to cut Lara with a lead left uppercut in the seventh round. Although the decision remains controversial, any talk of a rematch in the future was dismissed by Oscar De La Hoya who went on to say, "No one wants a rematch." This fight resulted in Lara's second professional loss.

==== Lara vs. Smith ====
On 12 December 2014, at the Alamodome in San Antonio, Texas, Lara showcased his ability to move in range to punch and then swiftly escape without taking damage against Ishe Smith. Lara consistently landed the straight left hand after “blinding” or “occupying” Smith's guard with the lead hand. Lara would move in a forward direction towards Smith and escape in a linear direction, oftentimes sidestepping, while landing the one-two combination. This lateral movement was enhanced by Lara's wide boxing stance, which also enhanced Lara's punching power. Lara was frequently able to turn Smith into additional punches by stepping around Smith's lead foot, thus enabling Lara to set traps. Lara dominated the fight and successfully defended his WBA (Regular) super welterweight title by unanimous decision with the scorecards reading: 119–109, 119–109, and 117–111.

=== WBA and IBO super welterweight champion ===
==== Lara vs. Rodríguez, Zaveck ====
On 12 June 2015, Lara defended his WBA (Regular) super welterweight title and won the vacant IBO title against Delvin Rodríguez at the UIC Pavilion in Chicago. In a technical exhibition, Lara's exquisite timing and fast hands allowed him to out land Rodríguez 233 to 63 in total punches and connect on 62% of his power punches. Lara was able to score a knockdown in round six via straight left hand. In a virtual shutout, Lara earned a unanimous decision with all three judges agreeing 120–107.

On 25 November 2015, Lara defended his WBA and IBO super welterweight titles against Jan Zaveck in Hialeah, Florida. On a wetted canvas due to prior heavy rain, Lara began by walking down Zaveck who was relying on wide punches. Lara continued to stay in the pocket and countered Zaveck, halting his aggression. At the end of round two, Zaveck was hurt after Lara split his jab with a clean left hand. Lara landed a straight left hand at the start of round three followed by a series of combinations punctuating with an uppercut at which point Zaveck put his hand out, turned away, and refused to continue. Zaveck appeared to be in quite a lot of pain after the fight, which was stopped 41 seconds into round three.

==== Lara vs. Martirosyan II ====
It was announced that Lara would be defending his titles in a rematch from 2012 with Vanes Martirosyan, which ended in a draw. The fight was to take place as part of a triple header also including the Charlo twins and Austin Trout. The fight took place on 21 May 2016, in Las Vegas. On fight night, Lara unofficially weighed 160.5 pounds while Martirosyan came in at 170 pounds. Martirosyan spent much of the fight attempting to impose his strength and body work on Lara. As a result, Martirosyan inadvertently landed multiple low blows until he was deducted a point in the eleventh round. The bout was also plagued by head clashes much like during their previous encounter. In the early rounds both men stayed in perfect range, each relying on their own reflexes and quick transitions from defense to offense. Lara found openings for his sharp punches. As the fight progressed, he was more mobile and dictated the pace, outmaneuvering Martirosyan while managing to land flashy 1-2-1 combinations. After seizing ring generalship, Paulie Malignaggi noted Lara's "fluid footwork" and a resemblance to Pernell Whitaker as he often ducked low and displayed tricky pivot moves to evade Martirosyan's punches by inches. Lara landed 63 jabs and 60% of his power punches to Martirosyan's 16 jabs and 23% power punch connect rate. The fight averaged 491,000 viewers and peaked at 545,000 viewers.

==== Lara vs. Foreman ====
Early reports on 30 November 2016, stated that there were talks of Lara to defend his WBA and IBO titles against former WBA super welterweight champion Yuri Foreman (34–2, 10 KOs). Lara's team was also in talks with Luis Collazo. It was confirmed that the fight against Foreman would headline the Premier Boxing Champions on 13 January 2017. The fight was held at the Hialeah Park Racing and Casino in Miami, Florida, in front of a largely Cuban crowd. Foreman was knocked down in round three. Upon closer inspection, the fall could easily have been ruled a slip. Lara won the fight after delivering a knockout in the fourth round via left uppercut. Although Foreman beat the count, he was on unsteady legs after multiple attempts to get back up. The referee promptly waved off the bout. In the post-fight interview, Lara expressed his desire to finally face off with unified middleweight titlist Gennady Golovkin and rematch lineal middleweight titlist Canelo Álvarez. The fight averaged 547,000 viewers on Spike TV and peaked at 707,000.

==== Lara vs. Gausha ====
It was confirmed on 24 August 2017, by Ringtv that Lara would fight former Olympian Terrell Gausha (20–0, 9 KOs) as part of a super welterweight triple header on 14 October 2017, at the Barclays Center in New York City. Other fights on the card would include Jermell Charlo's mandatory title defence against top prospect Erickson Lubin and Jarrett Hurd defending his IBF title against former champion Austin Trout. In front of 7,643, Lara knocked down Gausha en route to a 12-round unanimous decision to retain his world titles. Lara used his accurate jab and left hand putting on a clinic winning with the scorecards 116-111 and 117-110 twice in his favour. Lara connected with a left hook followed by a left straight, which floored Gausha in the fourth round. Lara landed 121 of 528 punches (23%), while Gausha connected with 77 of 329 (23%), which appeared to do little damage. Lara praised his opponent in the post-fight interview, "We want to give a lot of credit to Gausha. He's an Olympian. I take the rhythm of the boxing match, and that's when I take over. He's fighting with the best in the division. He's not a stupid fighter, but he knew who he was facing today." Lara earned $700,000 for the fight and Gausha had a $250,000 purse. This fight, which was the main event of a triple header, averaged 399,000 viewers and peaked at 476,000 viewers on Showtime.

==== Lara vs. Hurd ====
Demetrius Andrade vacated his WBA (Regular) title on 22 October 2017, after making his debut at middleweight. The WBA, in their efforts to reduce the number of titles in each weight division, promoted Interim titleholder Brian Castaño (14–0, 10 KOs) to WBA (Regular) champion. On 29 October, the WBA ordered the fight between Lara and Castaño. On 9 January 2018, it was confirmed that a deal was being put in place for a unification fight between Lara and IBF junior middleweight champion Jarrett Hurd (21–0, 15 KO) for April 2018 with Showtime televising the bout. On 25 January, the fight was confirmed to take place on 7 April. It was reported Lara would receive a purse of $1 million and Hurd would receive a $500,000 purse. Lara weighed 153.5 pounds and Hurd came in slightly lighter at 153 pounds.

Hurd won a 12-round split decision over Lara in what was a potential fight of a year candidate to become a unified light middleweight champion. With the fight in the balance, Hurd knocked Lara down with a short left hook in round 12 with a minute remaining. Lara was hurt from the knockdown, but was able to get up and still throw some nice shots. Hurd dominated the final round. Two judges scored the fight 114-113 for Hurd and the third judge had the same score for Lara, meaning the knockdown was the deciding factor in the fight. A lot of rounds where close with Lara using effective counter punching and combinations, whereas Hurd used his size to stalk Lara and land power shots. Lara's right eye began to swell from round 7 and was eventually cut at the start of round 12. Lara started the fight the better boxer of the two, due to Hurd not putting as much pressure on Lara until the later rounds. With the win, Hurd became seventh unified world title holder in light middleweight history, joining Hall of Famers Terry Norris, Félix Trinidad, Oscar De La Hoya and Winky Wright, as well as Floyd Mayweather Jr. and Canelo Álvarez.

Despite the knockdown, Lara thought he had a good enough lead to win the fight. Had Lara not been knocked down, the fight would have finished a majority draw with both boxers keeping their respective belts. In regards to the decision, Lara said, "Besides the last round, I thought I was winning this fight easily. That's not to decide the fight. One punch in a fight doesn't determine the fight. One hundred percent I want the rematch. The problem was the cut on the eye. I couldn't see in the last round." After the fight, Hurd said, "It was a tough one, but I went out there and did exactly what I said I was going to do -- fight all 12 rounds and get the victory. I didn't feel like that [12th-round knockdown for the win]. I feel like I was in control the whole fight, applying the pressure." According to CompuBox statistics, Hurd landed 217 of 824 punches thrown (26%) and Lara landed 176 of his 572 thrown (31%). Hurd outlanded Lara 106-71 in the final four rounds, with 96 being power shots compared to Lara's 58 power punches. The fight, televised on Showtime, averaged 490,000 viewers and peaked at 521,000 viewers.

Although the WBA ordered a direct rematch between Lara and Hurd, the latter rejected the idea stating he wanted to move on to bigger fights to become undisputed light middleweight champion.

=== Later career ===
In October 2018, at the WBC annual convention in Kyiv, it was announced that Jermell Charlo would be allowed to make another voluntary defence and Lara was ordered to fight Julian Williams (25-1-1, 15 KOs, 1 NC) in a final eliminator. At the time, Williams was already IBF's #1 ranked. On 30 October, according to Brian Castaño's manager Sebastian Contursis, a deal was being worked out to have Castaño fight Lara. A date in January 2019 was being discussed. In order for Castaño to defend his WBA (Regular) belt against Lara, the WBA granted him a special permit.

==== Lara vs. Castano ====
On 2 March 2019, Lara faced Brian Castano for the WBA world super welterweight title and fought to a split-decision draw. One judge had it 115-113 for Lara, one had it 115-113 for Castano while the third judge saw it as a draw, scoring the fight 114-114. The split-decision draw was met with approval from both boxing fans and pundits alike.

==== Lara vs. Alvarez ====
In his next fight, Lara ranked #2 by the WBA at super welterweight, fought Ramon Alvarez, the brother of Canelo Alvarez, who was ranked #6 by the WBA, for the vacant WBA super welterweight title. Lara labeled the fight personal because of his history with the Alvarez family. Lara dominated the fight and stopped Alvarez within two rounds, to earn yet another title belt in his career.

==== Lara vs. Vendetti ====
In his first title defence, Lara faced WBA #11, Greg Vendetti. Vendetti showed a lot of courage and fight, but Lara was simply too good for him, outboxing him in almost every round of the fight. All three judges saw it that way, as Lara won the fight via unanimous decision in his second successful title defence.

=== WBA middleweight champion ===
==== Lara vs. Zerafa ====
On March 30, 2024 at T-Mobile Arena in Las Vegas, Lara defeated Michael Zerafa via second-round TKO and made the second successful defense of his WBA middleweight title.

==== Lara vs. Garcia ====
Lara was scheduled to make the third defense of his WBA middleweight title against Danny Garcia at T-Mobile Arena in Las Vegas on September 14, 2024. Lara won the fight by ninth-round stoppage.

==== Lara vs. Gonzalez ====
Lara was scheduled to face IBF and WBO middleweight Janibek Alimkhanuly for the unified titles, in San Antonio, Texas, on December 6, 2025. On December 2, 2025, it was announced that Alimkhanuly failed VADA anti-doping test, and was replaced by Johan Gonzalez.

==== Lara vs. Tszyu ====
Lara is scheduled to fight Tim Tszyu for the WBA middleweight title on 13 December 2026 at Cbus Super Stadium on the Gold Coast, Queensland in what has been dubbed one of the biggest boxing events in Australian boxing history.

== Professional boxing record ==
38 fights	32 wins	3 losses
By knockout	19	0
By decision	13	3
Draws	3	

No.	Result	Record	Opponent	Type	Round, time	Date	Location	Notes
38	Win	32–3–3	Johan Gonzalez	UD	12	6 Dec 2025	Frost Bank Center, San Antonio, Texas, U.S.	Retained WBA middleweight title
37	Win	31–3–3	Danny Garcia	RTD	9 (12), 3:00	14 Sep 2024	T-Mobile Arena, Paradise, Nevada, U.S.	Retained WBA middleweight title
36	Win	30–3–3	Michael Zerafa	TKO	2 (12), 2:59	30 Mar 2024	T-Mobile Arena, Paradise, Nevada, U.S.	Retained WBA middleweight title
35	Win	29–3–3	Gary O'Sullivan	TKO	8 (12), 0:23	28 May 2022	Barclays Center, New York City, New York, U.S.	Retained WBA (Regular) middleweight title
34	Win	28–3–3	Thomas LaManna	KO	1 (12), 1:20	1 May 2021	Dignity Health Sports Park, Carson, California, U.S.	Won vacant WBA (Regular) middleweight title
33	Win	27–3–3	Greg Vendetti	UD	12	29 Aug 2020	Microsoft Theater, Los Angeles, California, U.S.	Retained WBA (Regular) light middleweight title; Won vacant IBO light middleweight title
32	Win	26–3–3	Ramón Álvarez	TKO	2 (12), 2:03	31 Aug 2019	Minneapolis Armory, Minneapolis, Minnesota, U.S.	Won vacant WBA (Regular) light middleweight title
31	Draw	25–3–3	Brian Castaño	SD	12	2 Mar 2019	Barclays Center, New York City, New York, U.S.	For WBA (Regular) light middleweight title
30	Loss	25–3–2	Jarrett Hurd	SD	12	7 Apr 2018	The Joint, Paradise, Nevada, U.S.	Lost WBA (Super) and IBO light middleweight titles; For IBF light middleweight title
29	Win	25–2–2	Terrell Gausha	UD	12	14 Oct 2017	Barclays Center, New York City, New York, U.S.	Retained WBA (Super) and IBO light middleweight titles
28	Win	24–2–2	Yuri Foreman	KO	4 (12), 1:47	13 Jan 2017	Park Race Track, Hialeah, Florida, U.S.	Retained WBA (Super) and IBO light middleweight titles
27	Win	23–2–2	Vanes Martirosyan	UD	12	21 May 2016	Cosmopolitan of Las Vegas, Paradise, Nevada, U.S.	Retained WBA and IBO light middleweight titles
26	Win	22–2–2	Jan Zaveck	TKO	3 (12), 0:41	25 Nov 2015	Park Race Track, Hialeah, Florida, U.S.	Retained WBA (Regular) and IBO light middleweight titles
25	Win	21–2–2	Delvin Rodríguez	UD	12	12 Jun 2015	UIC Pavilion, Chicago, Illinois, U.S.	Retained WBA (Regular) light middleweight title; Won vacant IBO light middleweight title
24	Win	20–2–2	Ishe Smith	UD	12	12 Dec 2014	Alamodome, San Antonio, Texas, U.S.	Retained WBA (Regular) light middleweight title
23	Loss	19–2–2	Canelo Álvarez	SD	12	12 Jul 2014	MGM Grand Garden Arena, Paradise, Nevada, U.S.	
22	Win	19–1–2	Austin Trout	UD	12	7 Dec 2013	Barclays Center, New York City, New York, U.S.	Retained WBA interim light middleweight title
21	Win	18–1–2	Alfredo Angulo	TKO	10 (12), 1:11	8 Jun 2013	Home Depot Center, Carson, California, U.S.	Won vacant WBA interim light middleweight title
20	Draw	17–1–2	Vanes Martirosyan	TD	9 (12), 0:26	10 Nov 2012	Wynn Las Vegas, Paradise, Nevada, U.S.	Split TD: Martirosyan cut from an accidental head clash
19	Win	17–1–1	Freddy Hernández	UD	10	30 Jun 2012	Fantasy Springs Resort Casino, Indio, California, U.S.	
18	Win	16–1–1	Ronald Hearns	TKO	1 (10), 1:34	20 Apr 2012	Beau Rivage, Biloxi, Mississippi, U.S.	
17	Loss	15–1–1	Paul Williams	MD	12	9 Jul 2011	Boardwalk Hall, Atlantic City, New Jersey, U.S.	
16	Draw	15–0–1	Carlos Molina	MD	10	25 Mar 2011	Cosmopolitan of Las Vegas, Paradise, Nevada, U.S.	
15	Win	15–0	Delray Raines	KO	1 (10), 2:59	14 Jan 2011	Fantasy Springs Resort Casino, Indio, California, U.S.	
14	Win	14–0	Tim Connors	TKO	1 (10), 1:38	27 Nov 2010	MGM Grand Garden Arena, Paradise, Nevada, U.S.	Won vacant WBA Fedelatin light middleweight title
13	Win	13–0	Willie Lee	TKO	1 (10), 1:48	18 Aug 2010	Civic Center, Monroe, Louisiana, U.S.	
12	Win	12–0	William Correa	TKO	1 (10), 2:34	9 Jul 2010	Softball Country Arena, Denver, Colorado, U.S.	
11	Win	11–0	Danny Perez	UD	10	2 Apr 2010	The Joint, Paradise, Nevada, U.S.	
10	Win	10–0	Grady Brewer	TKO	10 (10), 2:44	29 Jan 2010	The Joint, Paradise, Nevada, U.S.	
9	Win	9–0	Luciano Perez	UD	10	12 Dec 2009	UIC Pavilion, Chicago, Illinois, U.S.	
8	Win	8–0	Jose Varela	KO	1 (8), 2:12	19 Sep 2009	MGM Grand Garden Arena, Paradise, Nevada, U.S.	
7	Win	7–0	Darnell Boone	UD	6	17 Jul 2009	Planet Hollywood Resort and Casino, Paradise, Nevada, U.S.	
6	Win	6–0	Edwin Vazquez	TKO	4 (8), 1:13	22 May 2009	Fontainebleau Hotel, Miami Beach, Florida, U.S.	
5	Win	5–0	Chris Gray	UD	4	2 May 2009	MGM Grand Garden Arena, Paradise, Nevada, U.S.	
4	Win	4–0	Keith Gross	KO	1 (4), 1:09	20 Feb 2009	Don Taft University Center, Fort Lauderdale, Florida, U.S.	
3	Win	3–0	Rodrigo Aguiar	TKO	1 (4), 2:59	9 Jan 2009	Buffalo Bill's, Primm, Nevada, U.S.	
2	Win	2–0	Deniss Aleksejevs	TKO	1 (4), 2:19	12 Sep 2008	Kugelbake-Halle, Cuxhaven, Germany	
1	Win	1–0	Ivan Maslov	PTS	4	4 Jul 2008	Buyuk Anadolu Hotel, Ankara, Turkey	

== Pay-per-view bouts ==
United States
Date	Fight	Billing	Buys	Network	Revenue
12 July 2014	Canelo vs. Lara	Honor and Glory	300,000	Showtime	$17,997,000

== See also ==
- List of world light-middleweight boxing champions
- List of world middleweight boxing champions

Sporting positions
Regional boxing titles
Vacant Title last held by Austin Trout	WBA Fedelatin light middleweight champion November 27, 2010 – June 2011; Vacated	Vacant Title next held by Jonathan González
Minor world boxing titles
Vacant Title last held by Zaurbek Baysangurov	IBO light middleweight champion June 12, 2015 – April 7, 2018	Succeeded by Jarrett Hurd
Vacant Title last held by Jeison Rosario	IBO light middleweight champion August 29, 2020 – September 1, 2021; Vacated	Vacant Title next held by Sam Eggington
Major world boxing titles
Preceded by Anthony Mundine stripped	WBA light middleweight champion Interim title June 8, 2013 – March 13, 2014; Promoted	Vacant Title next held by Jack Culcay
Vacant Title last held by Austin Trout	WBA light middleweight champion Regular title March 13, 2014 – January 19, 2016; Status changed	Vacant Title next held by Jack Culcay
Vacant Title last held by Miguel Cotto	WBA light middleweight champion January 19, 2016 – June 8, 2016; Promoted	Vacant Title next held by Israil Madrimov
Vacant Title last held by Floyd Mayweather Jr.	WBA light middleweight champion Super title June 8, 2016 – April 7, 2018	Succeeded by Jarrett Hurd
Vacant Title last held by Brian Castaño	WBA light middleweight champion Regular title August 31, 2019 – August 31, 2021; Vacated	Vacant Title next held by Title discontinued
Vacant Title last held by Ryōta Murata	WBA middleweight champion Regular title May 1, 2021 – March 9, 2023; Promoted	Vacant Title next held by Title discontinued
Preceded by Gennady Golovkin as Super champion	WBA middleweight champion March 9, 2023 – present	Incumbent
