= Jermell Charlo =

American boxer (born 1990)

Personal information
- Nickname: Iron Man
- Born: Jermell DeAvante Charlo; May 19, 1990 (age 36) Lafayette, Louisiana, U.S.
- Height: 5 ft 11 in (180 cm)
- Weight: Light middleweight; Super middleweight

Boxing career
- Reach: 73 in (185 cm)
- Stance: Orthodox

Boxing record
- Total fights: 38
- Wins: 35
- Win by KO: 19
- Losses: 2
- Draws: 1

Jermell DeAvante Charlo (/dʒɜːrˈmɛl/; born May 19, 1990) is an American professional boxer. He held the undisputed championship (Note: Four-belt era: World Boxing Association (WBA) (Super version), World Boxing Council (WBC), International Boxing Federation (IBF), and World Boxing Organization (WBO) titles) at light middleweight from 2022 to 2023 and The Ring light middleweight title from 2020 to 2024.

His identical twin brother, Jermall Charlo, is also a professional boxer and a world champion.

== Early life ==
Jermell is younger than his identical twin Jermall by one minute. Both brothers are graduates of Alief Hastings High School in Houston, Texas.

== Amateur career ==
They began boxing when they started following their father, a former boxer, into the gym. Jermell graduated to the elite level on the amateur boxing scene after two years, winning a bronze medal at the 2005 Junior Olympics at age fifteen. He ended his amateur career with a record of 56 wins and 8 losses.

== Professional career ==
=== Early career ===
He began his professional career at the age of 17 on December 8, 2007, with a four-round decision win over Corey Sommerville. On April 19, 2008, he stopped Jesus Villareal in three rounds and after scoring an impressive first-round TKO over Dwayne Jones in June, Charlo added the names Rodrigo Villareal (TKO4) and Deon Nash (W6) to his victims list before the year was out. In 2009, he scored a shutout four-round decision over Juan Serrano on February 28, got a decision win over Carlos Garcia over six rounds on April 4, TKO'd Federico Flores Jr. in the eighth round on June 26, defeated Vardan Gasparyan in six, and then finished up the year with a second-round knockout of unbeaten prospect Abdon Lozano.

Charlo scored a sensational one-punch knockout of Chicago's Chris Chatman in the third round. Chatman's only previous loss was a six-round decision to 2008 U.S. Olympian Demetrius Andrade in 2009, but he was no match for Charlo, who controlled his awkward opponent for most of the fight. In the third round, he landed a flush straight right hand to Chatman's chin and knocked him out at 1 minute, 22 seconds. With this win, at the age of 22, Charlo had a record of 17 wins, with no losses with 8 wins inside the distance.

On June 8, 2013, Charlo fought former light welterweight contender Demetrius Hopkins (33-2-1, 13 KOs). In a close back and forth affair were Charlo controlled the action in the early rounds with his aggression and power shots, he defeated Hopkins by unanimous decision. All three judges scored it 115-113. The crowd seemed to be displeased with the performances.

Charlo next fought in October against 34 year old Jose Angel Rodriguez (17-2-1, 2 KOs) in a scheduled 10 round fight at the BB&t Center in Sunrise, Florida. Charlo won the fight in the last round via TKO.

=== Rise up the ranks ===
==== Charlo vs. Rosado ====
In November 2013, it was reported that Charlo would step up and fight Philadelphia veteran boxer and former world title challenger Gabriel Rosado (21-7, 13 KOs) on January 25, 2014, at D.C. Armory in Washington, D.C., on Showtime. Prior to the fight, Rosado was 0-2-1 in his last three fights. He was also moving back down to light middleweight after having little success at middleweight and claimed he would be Charlo's toughest fight. Charlo passed the biggest test of his career and looked good doing so as he easily out boxed Rosado to win a lopsided 10-round unanimous decision. The judges scored the fight 100-90, 99-91 and 97-93 all in Charlo's favor. Charlo landed 50% of his punches thrown compared to Rosado's 18%. The fight averaged 472,000 viewers on Showtime.

On May 24, 2014, Charlo defeated Charlie Ota at the Bell Centre in Montreal, Quebec. Charlo was dropped in round 3 but he still won a unanimous decision after twelve rounds, with the scorecards reading 118-109 twice and 115-111.

==== Charlo vs. Andrade negotiations ====
Charlo was scheduled to fight Demetrius Andrade (21-0, 14 KOs) at Mandalay Bay Resort & Casino on December 13, 2014, for WBO light middleweight title but on November 16 was cancelled due to purse issues. Andrade was reportedly offered $250,000, but later increased to what would be a career high $300,000 purse.

Following the cancellation of the Andrade fight, Charlo fought in December 2014 against Mario Alberto Lozano on the undercard of Amir Khan vs. Devon Alexander at the MGM Grand Arena in Las Vegas. Charlo won a clear 100-90 on all three scorecards of the 10 round fight.

In January 2015, Banner Promotions who promote Andrade stated the fight was back on and likely to take place in the Spring of 2015. The following month, Star Boxing and Banner Promotions announced a deal was being worked out, however a fight did not materialise.

==== Charlo vs. Martirosyan ====
On February 17, 2015, Showtime announced that Charlo would appear on a doubleheader at the Palms Casino Resort in Las Vegas. on March 28 against former world title challenger Vanes Martirosyan (35-1-1, 25 KOs). Other venues discussed for the bout were Illusions Theatre in San Antonio, Texas, and StubHub Center in Carson, California. The fight was contested over 10 rounds. Martirosyan weighed 153 pounds, however Charlo stood on the scales at 154.75 pounds. Because there was no title at stake, there was not a hard weight limit in place. It appeared the contract stated there was a +/- 1 lb. tolerance. This is a common case in non-title fights. Charlo won a fairly contentious unanimous decision. The scores were 97-93, 96-94, 96-94. Both fighters started the fight slow utilizing their respected jabs. Charlo landed the faster punches but they came with little damage, although they were point scoring shots. Martirosyan was the boxer coming forward more and managing to find the bigger shots. By round 4, Martirosyan began to miss most of his punches with Charlo countering well. The remainder of the fight was closely contested. In round 8, there was a timeout period following an accidental clash of heads. The ringside doctor checked Martirosyan's left eye. Martirosyan felt he won the fight.

On September 25, Premier Boxing Champions announced that Charlo would next fight former light middleweight champion Joachim Alcine (35-7-2, 21 KOs) On October 31 at the NRG Arena in Houston, Texas. Charlo won the fight after knocking Alcine out in round 6 of their scheduled 12 round bout. Charlo outboxed Alcine for 5 rounds eventually dropping him in round 6 with a right hand to the head. Alcine beat the count but looked badly hurt. Charlo followed on by landing a barrage of punches to which Alcine had no reply to causing referee Jon Schorle to stop the fight at 1 minute and 20 seconds. After the fight, Charlo called out the recently retired Floyd Mayweather. At the age of 39, this was Alcine's final professional fight as he announced his retirement.

=== WBC light middleweight champion ===
==== Charlo vs. Jackson ====
During the annual WBC Convention in Kunming, China it was announced that Charlo would fight John Jackson (20-2, 15 KOs) for the vacant WBC light middleweight title. The title became vacant following the retirement of Floyd Mayweather Jr. The fight took place on May 21, 2015, at The Cosmopolitan of Las Vegas, in Las Vegas. The card also included top light middleweight boxers Erislandy Lara, Vanes Martirosyan, Austin Trout and brother Jermall, who successfully defended his IBF title. Through the first 7 rounds, Charlo had only won one round on all three judges scorecards, badly trailing (64-69). In round 8, Charlo hit Jackson with a right hand to the head followed by two lefts as Jackson turned away to adjust his mouthpiece and failed to keep his guard up. Referee Tony Weeks immediately jumped in to protect Jackson, who was knocked into the corner turnbuckle, and signaled the knockout 51 seconds into the round.

==== Charlo vs. Hatley ====
In December 2016, at the WBC 54th Convention in Miami, Florida. It was announced that Charlo would be due to fight two mandatory fights. The first of the two defenses would be in February 2017 against Charles Hatley, ranked No. 2 by WBC. The second mandatory would be decided when the winner of No. 5 ranked Erickson Lubin vs. Jorge Cota ranked No. 8 on March 4 fight the winner of No. 3 ranked Martirosyan and another contender. Lubin knocked Cota out in round 4 of their fight moving towards becoming the youngest world champion at the age of 21.

Charlo's defence against Hatley was pushed back to April 22, 2017, on the Shawn Porter vs. Andre Berto undercard. It was confirmed before the fight that Charlo would earn $100,000 and Hatley would receive a $85,000 purse. Charlo successfully defended his WBC title for the first time when he knocked Hatley out unconscious in round 6 after a right hook to the head. Before the end, Charlo was in control landing successive power shots. Hatley was also knocked down in round 3 following a combination of shots from Charlo. In the aftermath of the fight, Charlo spoke about a potential unification fight against Jarret Hurd, who won the vacant IBF title in February 2017, the title that previously belonged to Jermell's twin brother Jermall who moved up to middleweight. The fight averaged 401,000 viewers on Showtime.

==== Charlo vs. Lubin ====
On May 11, 2017, the WBC updated their rankings, placing 21 year old undefeated American prospect Erickson Lubin (18-0, 13 KOs) at number one. He moved up following his win over Cota. The ranking made Lubin the mandatory challenger for Charlo's world title. On July 20, Boxing Scene reported the fight could take place on September 30, 2017, as part of a double header, which would include Jarrett Hurd defending his IBF title against former light middleweight champion Austin Trout on Showtime. On August 24, Ringtv announced that the fight between Charlo and Lubin would take place on October 14 at the Barclays Center in New York City. Also on the card would see Erislandy Lara defend his WBA title against Terrell Gausha, with the card being billed as a super welterweight triple-header.

In front of 7,643, Charlo won the fight via first-round knockout to retain his WBC title. The opening round was cagey, with Charlo and Lubin not throwing much and hardly getting hit. The end came in the closing stages of the round when Charlo landed a huge right hand, landing flush on Lubin, dropping him backwards onto the canvas. Lubin did manage to get up, but the fight had already been stopped by referee Harvey Dock, who halted the fight immediately after Lubin was dropped and seeing him in pain. After the fight, Charlo called out IBF champion Jarrett Hurd, "Give me another title. I want Hurd. Hurd just fought. He just won. Give me Hurd. I want Hurd." Lubin believed he could have continued, but admitted the stoppage was fair, stating "He caught me with a blind shot. I didn't see it coming. He landed it. I got up. I felt like I could keep fighting, but it happens. I wanted to entertain the crowd. He caught me with a blind shot that I didn't see." The official time of stoppage was 2 minutes, 41 seconds. A member of Lubin's camp threw a chair at Jermall Charlo after the fight ended. Charlo earned a purse of $450,000, while Lubin earned $225,000 for the fight. The fight averaged 495,000 viewers and peaked 537,000 viewers on Showtime.

==== Charlo vs. Trout ====
At a Showtime press conference on January 24, 2018, it was announced that Charlo would make a third defence of his WBC title on June 9 on the undercard of Santa Cruz vs. Mares II at the Staples Center in Los Angeles. On April 10, it was announced that Charlo would fight former world champion Austin Trout (31-4, 17 KOs). The fight would mark Trout's third world title attempt in his last four fights. In October 2017, he suffered his first stoppage defeat to the hands of IBF champion Jarrett Hurd and prior to that, in May 2016, he lost a decision to Jermell's brother and then-IBF titleholder Jermall Charlo. Coming into this fight, Trout defeated Colombian boxer Juan De Angel via an 8 round unanimous decision in February 2018. Charlo retained his title defeating Trout in a close bout. One judge scored the bout 113-113, however the remaining two judges scored the bout 115-111 and 118-108 for Charlo, giving him the majority decision win. Charlo knocked Trout down in rounds 3 and 9. The bout, which was mostly a tactical affair, was not well received by the fans in attendance. They booed during the bout and again during the post fight interview of Charlo. The first knockdown came with a combination of punches finished with a left hook to the head. After the knockdown, Trout began to fight more defensively. A counter left hook dropped Trout a second time. After the fight, Trout said, "Take away the knockdowns, and I won the fight." Charlo stated his frustrations, "I knew he would come in and try to survive. I could catch him with my hook." According to CompuBox, Charlo landed 106 of 421 punches (25%) and Trout landed 82 of 407 his punches (20%). For his defence, Charlo was paid $750,000 and Trout received a $250,000 paycheck. The fight averaged 532,000 and peaked at 575,000 viewers.

==== Charlo vs. Harrison ====
In October 2018, Premier Boxing Champions announced a doubleheader for the Charlo twins on December 22, 2018, at the Barclays Center in Brooklyn, New York. The card, which would be televised by FOX, would feature Charlo defending his WBC light middleweight title against Tony Harrison (27-2, 21 KOs) and Jermall Charlo defending his WBC interim middleweight title. The twins flipped a coin to see who would close the show. Harrison was coming into the fight having won his last three bouts since his loss to Jarrett Hurd in February 2017. The official press conference took place on October 25. Hurd, who held the unified WBA & IBF titles, was hoping for a call out after the fight. Hurd was to be in attendance for the fight and said he would enter the ring following the fight, if his name was called. Both boxers weighed the same 153½ pounds for the bout. Charlo was listed as a 12-1 favorite.

There was an announced crowd of 9,177 fans in attendance. In a major upset, Charlo lost the bout via unanimous decision for his first defeat as a professional boxer, losing his title in the process. Harrison showed urgency and landed the cleaner shots for most of the fight. The first six rounds were dominated by Harrison, working behind his jab. He stepped off a little in the championship rounds, which allowed Charlo to come back and take the last few rounds in his favour. In comparison, some felt it was a poor effort by Charlo. He had previously struggled with boxers who come forward with powering shots. The three judges scorecards read 116-112, 115-113 and 115-113 in Harrison's favour, to a chorus of jeers from the crowd. With it being a voluntary defence, it was likely a rematch would take place. It was worth noting that PBC broadcasters did not agree with the decision, including trainer Joe Goossen and Fox's unofficial scorer Larry Hazzard Sr. scored the fight 117-111 in favour of Charlo, as did Dan Rafael of ESPN. Speaking after the fight, Charlo said, "They took that fight from me. I was pressing the action. He didn't win that fight. I'm going to get my belts back." Harrison, who was also in the ring replied, "Jermell -- you gave me a shot. I'll give you a rematch." According to CompuBox statistics, Charlo landed 160 of 548 punches thrown (29%) and Harrison landed 128 of his 377 punches (34%).

During the post-fight press conference, Charlo revealed there was a rematch clause in the contract and would take place within four months. Charlo appeared teary and upset at the conference. He said, “I ain’t no loser. You know what I mean? I don’t f*cking take losses easy. I don’t even play video games because I don’t like losing. Straight up.” Harrison had the same attitude in wanting the rematch next.

The average viewership for the card, which was PBC's return to FOX, was 2,114,184. The card peaked 2,421,000 viewers, which was during the main event. The fight was picked as BoxingScene’s 2018 Upset of the Year.

==== Charlo vs. Cota ====
Despite Charlo activating a rematch clause, the WBC ordered an immediate rematch in January 2019, and in May the fight was announced to take place on June 23, a special Sunday telecast, at the Mandalay Bay Events Center in Paradise, Nevada on FOX. The kick-off press conference was heated as soon as both boxers arrived. Both admitted the rematch felt more personal but on different levels. Harrison was disappointed the rematch was not taking place in his home city of Detroit. He last fought in Detroit in May 2014. He pushed for it to happen, but didn't believe Charlo would have agreed to it. On June 3, PBC announced the fight would be postposed to later in the year. Harrison tore ligaments on his right ankle. He would not be able to resume training for at least 10-weeks. The card was still scheduled to go ahead with Charlo now fighting Mexican boxer Jorge Cota (28-3, 25 KOs), who last saw action in April, losing a split-decision to Jeison Rosario. Cota was coming into the bout with extreme motivation after watching his fellow countryman Andy Ruiz upset Anthony Joshua for the heavyweight world titles. Cota was WBC's #1 ranked contender.

Charlo destroyed Cota with 20 seconds left in the third round with a big right to the chin. Cota proved to be overmatched, even before the match, with Charlo being listed as a 50-1 favorite. He was knocked down twice in the third. Referee Jay Nady stopped the fight after the second knockdown. Cota took the first round on all three judges scorecards. Charlo praised Cota post-fight, saying, “I wanna give a thank you and a congratulations to Jorge Cota. Even though he took the defeat, he still stepped in the ring. You know, the guy that [has] the title backed out the fight, and he was the one who stepped in the ring as fast as he did.” Harrison was in attendance for the fight. The fight averaged 1,832,000 viewers, with the whole card averaging 1,265,000 viewers across all FOX platforms.

==== Charlo vs. Harrison II ====
On November 5, the rematch between Charlo and Harrison (28-2, 21 KOs) was made official to take place on December 21 at Toyota Center in Ontario, California on FOX. Harrison had not fought since the first meeting, having pulled out of the original date set for the rematch. Speaking on the delay, Harrison said it made him hungrier for the fight. He explained his game plan was to work smarter. Charlo retained his stance that he won the first fight. The aim was to find a stoppage in the rematch and not leave it for the judges to decide the winner. PBC released a face-to-face which showed both boxers argue and debate over the rematch being cancelled and whether Harrison really wanted to take the rematch. Harrison explained he would not have been here otherwise, to which Charlo responded, Harrison has no option as it was ordered by the WBC. Despite the animosity, the weigh in was straight forward. Harrison scaled in at 153¼ pounds and Charlo weighed 153¼ pounds. Harrison then taunted Charlo with the belt during the face off. Harrison referred himself as the 'B' side in the rematch.

The fight was as close as the first bout until the 11th round when Harrison was dropped twice and referee Jack Reiss called a halt to the contest, giving Charlo the win, regaining his WBC title. Every shot Charlo threw, was with power. He dropped Harrison in round 2 during an exchange, which was considered a flash knockdown. Harrison took control following the third round. Unlike the first bout, which saw Harrison move more, this time he planted his feet more and traded. In round 11, it was a left hook which dropped Harrison. This came after Harrison had taunted Charlo in the ring. He beat the count, but was again in trouble as Charlo piled on the pressure of hard shots, dropping him again. The fight not called off here, despite Charlo climbing on the corner rope. Another barrage of punches followed, with Reiss finally stopping the fight at 2 minutes, 28 seconds. At the time of stoppage, two judges had the score 96-93 for Charlo, whilst the remaining judge had it 95-94 for Harrison.

During the post-fight, Charlo said, "I got the belt back and I didn't leave it up to the judges. Tony is a former champion. He had a lot on the line. I dominated and I knocked him out." Harrison congratulated Charlo, making no excuses, "I started getting a little lax and got caught. I hate it, but he earned it. The game plan was to do a little boxing. But taking a year off, my body wasn't used to it. He earned it and no excuses, I got caught slipping." There was talks of a trilogy. According to Compubox, Harrison landed 121 of 389 punches thrown (31.1%) and Charlo was less accurate, landing 127 of his 582 thrown (21.8%), of which 108 were power shots. The fight averaged 2.223 million viewers, with the whole card peaking 2.233 million viewers. This was the second highest for the year. Charlo was open to a third fight with Harrison in the future, but only if it headlined pay-per-view.

=== Unified light middleweight champion ===
==== Charlo vs. Rosario ====
On July 22, 2020 it was announced that the Charlo twins would co-headline a Showtime PPV. The card was scheduled to take place on September 26 at the Mohegan Sun Arena in Uncasville, Connecticut. It was announced that Charlo defend his title against the unified WBA (Super) & IBF light middleweight champion Jeison Rosario, in a unification bout, which included the vacant The Ring belt. Rosario vacated the lesser IBO title shortly after defeating Julian Williams in January 2020. Due to COVID restrictions, the event would take place without any fans in attendance. Showtime revealed the PPV price of $74.95. This was a promise from Showtime to suggest they would not increase costs and remain in line with the current market. In case any boxer had to pull out of the contest or tested positive for COVID, Bakhram Murtazaliev (17-0, 13 KOs), IBF’s mandatory challenger, who was scheduled to fight on the non-televised portion of the undercard, was on standby to step in. During virtual workouts, Charlo spoke to PBC's Ray Flores. Charlo was aiming to finish the fight inside the distance and not wanting the judges to decide the outcome. As the last time Charlo went the distance, he lost a controversial decision, although he gained revenge on Harrison. For the fight, Charlo was a 4-1 favorite. At the weigh in, Charlo came in at 153¾ pounds and Rosario officially weighed 153½ pounds.

Charlo unified the WBC, WBA & IBF world title, knocking out Rosario in eight rounds. Charlo would start quickly, dropping Rosario with a left hook to the top of the head in the first round. In the next few rounds Rosario managed to outwork Charlo with a series of attacks to the body, keeping Charlo on his back foot. Near the end of the sixth however, another left hook had Rosario down again. This time, he was badly hurt and was saved by the bell. Rosario was knocked down for the third time with a left jab in the eight round and was unable to beat the count, giving Charlo the knockout victory. Speaking after the bout Charlo said "I definitely proved that I'm more than just a puncher, but I also showed again that I'm a big puncher. I'd give myself an A tonight, I stuck to my game plan and listened to my coach. Everything we did in camp, I used it in this fight. I pushed myself the whole way through training camp. It's been a journey for me. I'm bringing the straps home to my family like they told me to." At the time of stoppage, Charlo was ahead 67-64, 67-64 & 66-65 on the cards. According to Compubox, Charlo landed 64 of 242 punches thrown (26.4%), with Rosario out landing him, connecting 85 of his 367 thrown (23.2%).

Following the fight, Rosario found it difficult to stand and was helped to his dressing room. He was then taken to hospital after feeling dizzy and nauseous. He underwent tests including MRI and EKG and was released on Sunday morning.

=== Undisputed light middleweight champion ===
==== Charlo vs Castaño ====
In April 2021 it was announced that Charlo would next defend his world titles in an attempt to unify and create an undisputed champion against WBO light middleweight champion Brian Castaño (17-0-1, 12 KOs). Castaño was known for his draw with Erislandy Lara in March 2019, having previously held the WBA (Regular) light middleweight title. He won the WBO title, dethroning Brazilian boxer Patrick Teixeira by unanimous decision in February 2021. It was rumoured the fight would take place in Charlo's hometown of Houston. The fight would be broadcast on Showtime on June 17, and it was revealed the card would take place at the AT&T Center in San Antonio. The winner would be crowned the first ever undisputed light middleweight champion in history, in the four-belt era. This was the fight which Charlo expected would put him in the boxing hall of fame. Most bookmakers listed Charlo a 2-1 favorite. Charlo stated this was the biggest fight of his career, and whilst showing respect towards Castaño, he felt he had fought tougher opponents in the past. Charlo was asked if predicted a knockout win, to which he responded, “I don’t know.” The weigh in took place at the Thompson San Antonio-Riverwalk hotel, where Charlo weighed 153 pounds, while Castaño officially weighed 153¼ pounds.

A competitive fight between them ended in a split draw, with scores of 117-111 Charlo, 114-113 Castaño and 114-114 even. Charlo won the final three round on all three judges scorecards to avoid an upset loss. Castaño set a good pace for the first nine rounds, beat Charlo to the punch, pushing him against the ropes and avoided a lot of Charlo's attack. A counter left hook in the tenth round from Charlo began to steer the fight in his direction. Castaño was put on unsteady legs. Fans anticipated the end was near, however Castaño began exchanging with Charlo. Before the last round, Charlo's trainer Derrick James told him he needed a knockout to win. The result was controversial, with much attention being brought to judge Nelson Vazquez’s 117-111 Charlo card, which was described as "terrible" by Andre Ward. In the post-fight press conference, Charlo commented "...honestly I think it was a closer fight than it seems. Somebody had it like 117-111... 117-111 was kind of a large range." Charlo thought he'd won, believing he hurt Castaño more than he hurt him. Castaño felt he was robbed off a win. Both boxers were open to rematch, in order to finally crown an undisputed champion. WBC president Mauricio Sulaiman stated the result was fair.

According to Compubox, Charlo landed 151 of 533 punches thrown (28.3%) and Castaño landed 173 of his 586 thrown (29.5%). He out-landed Charlo in power punches 164-98. The fight averaged 422,000 viewers and peaked at 536,000 viewers, which came towards the end, on Showtime, which made the fight the most-watched live boxing match since December 2019.

==== Charlo vs Castaño II ====
Following the controversial draw, both boxers spoke openly with the media about a rematch. Castaño said, “I think if Charlo is not afraid for a rematch, and I don’t think he is afraid, I don’t know what his plans are. If he’s planning to move up to 160, that’s up to him. But like I said before, I need the three belts that he has, so I’m up for a rematch, of course. But I don’t know what, exactly, are his plans.” Charlo said he would take the rematch, but did not know when. On November 27, 2021, it was revealed by ESPN that Castaño and Charlo had agreed to face each other in a rematch. The WBO agreed to not order any mandatories to allow the rematch to take place. The fight was officially announced on February 8, 2022, to take place on March 19 at the Crypto.com Arena in Los Angeles, California.

After suffering a slight biceps tear during training, Castaño was forced to withdraw on February 17. This caused the fight to me postponed for at least four weeks. A day later, the WBO ordered Castaño to show cause as to why Charlo shouldn't be scheduled to make an overdue mandatory title defense against Tim Tszyu. The WBO took some time in making a decision, but ultimately approved the rematch, which was rearranged to take place on May 14 at the Dignity Health Sports Park in Carson, California. Castaño officially weighed 153¾ pounds and Charlo weighed one pound lighter at 152¾ pounds.

Like the first fight, the rematch was competitive, the two men spent the opening rounds trading blows before Charlo began to build a lead. In the 10th round, Charlo scored 2 knockdowns, the first with a body shot followed up by a left hook. The second was left to the head and another body shot sent Castaño back to the canvas badly hurt, he did not beat the count and Charlo was awarded a KO victory. Charlo unified the WBO belt with his WBA, WBC and IBF light middleweight belts, becoming the 7th male four-belt undisputed champion in history and the first undisputed light middleweight champion since Winky Wright in 2004. Castaño was down on all three of the judges' scorecards at the time of the stoppage, with scores of 84–87, 83–88 and 82–89.

Speaking after the bout Charlo said "I showed the fans, I showed these haters I can stand there and trade. One thing I changed up is try not to be on the ropes too much ... place shots on really precise parts on the body and wear him out." Castaño was gracious in defeat saying "We both were fighting back and forth. It was power back and forth, and then his right hand came over and stopped the fight. He's a champion. He hit me. He got me. We showed that we are warriors. That's the main thing. We have to feed our families." According to Compubox, Charlo 173 of 559 punches thrown (30.9%), and Castaño landed 194 of his 610 thrown (31.8%), 174 of which were power punches. Both landed over 40% of their power punches. The fight averaged 756,000 viewers, peaking at 832,000 viewers, making it Showtime's biggest audience for boxing match in three years.

==== Cancelled Tim Tszyu fight ====
WBO's mandatory challenger Tim Tszyu (21-0, 15 KOs) was at the arena to watch Charlo become undisputed champion. He made it known that he wanted to fight Charlo in the United States, and not in his native Australia, as there would be more money involved, more eyes and his status within the American audience. Whenever Charlo was asked about fighting Tszyu, he always sounded off to suggest he was not interested in the fight. No Limit Promotions, who deal on behalf of Tszyu, confirmed talks were underway. Tszyu was adamant he had his shot next at the titles, whether that be with Charlo, or a vacant title. According to Tszyu, Charlo had four months to decide whether he was going to defend his titles against him or vacate. On May 31, the WBO officially ordered the bout, giving both partied until June 20, to come to an agreement. George Rose, CEO of No Limit Promotions, eyed the end of 2022, potentially in Las Vegas or Los Angeles. By June 12, terms were agreed. A spanner was thrown in the works after Main Events, promoter of long-time IBF mandatory challenger Bakhram Murtazaliev (20-0, 15 KOs), claimed he should be next according to the rotation system. A contract was drawn up and a promise in writing by Charlo and TGB Promotions, which read either Charlo would vacate the IBF title or defend against Murtazaliev. To help matters, Tszyu stated, should he beat Charlo, he would make his first defence against Murtazaliev. Tszyu stated there was more public interest in him against Charlo. The fight was officially announced to take place on January 28, 2023 at the Michelob ULTRA Arena at Mandalay Bay Resort and Casino in Las Vegas on Showtime.

A month before the fight was scheduled to take place, Charlo broke his hand in two different place, forcing the bout to be postponed. The injury happened during a sparring session. Charlo visited a specialist and two doctors, as the hand was placed in a cast and would remain so for at least two months. Charlo was disappointed, as was Tszyu, who expected to still reschedule a new fight date. While some questioned the untimely injury, the WBO issued a 'Notice of Medical Certification'. Charlo took to social media to silence the media, posting a note from Dr. Vincent Chau Phan stated, “Jermell Charlo was seen in my clinic on 12/23/2022. He has sustained a left scaphoid fracture and 5th metacarpal base fracture. He will be placed in a short arm cast at this time. It is my recommendation that Jermell should refrain from upper extremity training that involves impact for 2 months.” In the meantime, former world champion Tony Harrison, offered to step in and fight Tszyu. In March 2023, Tszyu knocked out Harrison in Australia, to claim the vacant interim WBO title. Tszyu came out of the bout without any injuries with his team looking to make the fight with Charlo in July 2023. Charlo appeared on The Last Stand Podcast, giving a positive update. Although he was not training, the recovery as going well and he expected to be back in the ring in the Summer. Tszyu wanted to stay busy, defending his interim WBO title in June, stopping Carlos Ocampo in the first round. He then joked at the post-fight press conference, suggesting Charlo would move up from the light middleweight division.

=== Super middleweight ===
==== Charlo vs. Álvarez ====
Instead of defending his titles against Tszyu, Charlo moved up two weight divisions to challenge undisputed super middleweight champion Canelo Álvarez (59–2–2, 39 KOs) on September 30, at the T-Mobile Arena in Las Vegas. In order to make the fight, Álvarez, signed a 3-fight deal with Charlo's handlers, PBC. For months, rumours circulated Álvarez would be fighting Jermall, so the news that he was fighting Jermell came as a shock to many in the boxing industry, mostly because Charlo had never competed above 154 pounds at championship level.

The fight was billed as "Undisputed vs. Undisputed". The WBO would allow Charlo to enter the ring and be announced by the MC as the undisputed light middleweight champion, however, after the first bell rung, he would be stripped of the WBO title, elevating Tszyu to full championship status. Charlo spoke on the matter calling it unfair by the WBO, as he only recently won the title and fully intended to fight at the light middleweight division after the fight with Álvarez. When asked about not fighting Tszyu, Charlo said, “I know Tim Tszyu was my [mandatory] challenger. But he does nothing for my career.” Both boxers weighed the same 167.4 pounds for the fight, a career-high for Charlo.

Both fighters were cautious early and landed just one punch each in the opening round, but from the second round Álvarez would largely control the pace the bout, backing Charlo into the ropes and landing heavy punches to the body. About a minute into the 7th round, Álvarez sent Charlo to his knee with a right hook and right uppercut. It was just the second time that Charlo had been knocked down in his career. Charlo beat the count but by this time, appeared to be focused on just trying to survive and see the final bell. Whenever Álvarez cut inside, Charlo moved out of range without engaging. At the end of 12 rounds, all three judges scored the bout for Álvarez with scores of 119–108, 118–109 and 118–109 giving him a unanimous decision victory.

According to Compubox, Álvarez landed 134 of 385 punches thrown (35%) compared to Charlo, who landed 71 of his 398 thrown (18%). According to Dan Rafael, the PPV sold up to 700,000 units, generating $59,500,000 in revenue, which was in the top 3 PPV's for the year after Davis-Garcia sold 1.2 million and Spence-Crawford sold around 700,000 PPV's.

=== Return to light middleweight ===
==== Losing the world titles ====
Less than two weeks removed from his second professional loss, the IBF ordered Charlo to start negotiations with long-time mandatory challenger Bakhram Murtazaliev (22–0, 15 KOs), with both teams given 30 days to agree terms. By early November, only little progress had been made and the bout looked likely to head towards purse bids, which was then scheduled for November 21. On the day of the purse bids, the IBF announced that Charlo had chosen to vacate the IBF title, rather than fight Murtazaliev, who would be ordered to fight Jack Culcay, the next available ranked contender, for the vacant title. Charlo had now lost two of his world titles without stepping into the ring.

The WBC were more flexible with Charlo, as they approved the Castaño rematch and instead ordered for the next highest ranked contenders to contest for the WBC interim championship. At the 61st annual WBC convention in November 2023, they officially ordered Sebastian Fundora to fight Serhii Bohachuk. In January 2024, the WBC re-classified Charlo's status to “champion in recess”, allowing Fundora and Bohachuk to fight for the full championship.

On March 2, 2024 the WBA officially stripped Charlo of his world title, which meant he had lost the WBO, IBF, WBC and now the WBA titles all in the space of nine months. This allowed the Israil Madrimov vs. Magomed Kurbanov fight, the following week in Riyadh, to be contested for the WBA title. The title was won by Madrimov. In April, Charlo's team wrote to the WBA, invoking his right to challenge Madrimov (10–0–1, 7KOs) for the title. At the same time, this was putting a dent in Turki Alalshikh's plans to have Madrimov defend the title against Terence Crawford (40–0, 31 KOs), who was moving up a weight division, aiming to win a world title in a fourth weight. The fight was allowed to take place after the WBA offered a resolution, were Charlo could fight the winner.

On March 21, 2025 Tom Brown told Lance Pugmire that Charlo was in the gym and training, looking for a comeback later in the year.

In August 2025, Charlo posted an image depicting a lion consuming a shark, representing his nickname "the lion" and Errol Spence's nickname "the shark." This imagery suggested a possible matchup between the two, as both athletes aimed to rebound from their recent defeats. The prospect of this fight became more compelling following Spence's separation from trainer Derrick James, which resulted from a disagreement concerning compensation. Jacob Spence, the cousin of Errol, issued a caution to Charlo concerning their prospective fight. He stated, "We could do him worse than Canelo did." Earlier this year, Spence was in negotiations with WBC super-welterweight champion Sebastian Fundora, but the discussions did not reach a conclusion due to disagreements. According to Mike Coppinger, on September 10, the two teams were in talks to fight in 2026.

==== Return to the ring ====
On November 1, 2026, it was reported that Charlo would end his 3-year off and return on the Tim Tszyu vs. Erislandy Lara undercard in December 2026. It was likely that he would fight a local boxer. Days later, it was announced that he would fight Brock Jarvis (23–2, 21 KOs) in a 10 round contest on December 12.

== Legal issues ==
Charlo was arrested in Texas on December 16, 2023 and charged with misdemeanor assault. The Daily Mail reported he allegedly attacked a family member. He was released on December 23.

== Professional boxing record ==
38 fights	35 wins	2 losses
By knockout	19	0
By decision	16	2
Draws	1	

No.	Result	Record	Opponent	Type	Round, time	Date	Location	Notes
38	Loss	35–2–1	Canelo Álvarez	UD	12	Sep 30, 2023	T-Mobile Arena, Las Vegas, Nevada, U.S.	For WBA (Super), WBC, IBF, WBO, and The Ring super middleweight titles
37	Win	35–1–1	Brian Castaño	KO	10 (12), 2:33	May 14, 2022	Dignity Health Sports Park, Carson, California, U.S.	Retained WBA (Super), WBC, IBF, and The Ring light middleweight titles; Won WBO light middleweight title
36	Draw	34–1–1	Brian Castaño	SD	12	Jul 17, 2021	AT&T Center, San Antonio, Texas, U.S.	Retained WBA (Super), WBC, IBF, and The Ring light middleweight titles; For WBO light middleweight title
35	Win	34–1	Jeison Rosario	KO	8 (12), 0:21	Sep 26, 2020	Mohegan Sun Arena, Montville, Connecticut, U.S.	Retained WBC light middleweight title; Won WBA (Super), IBF, and vacant The Ring light middleweight titles
34	Win	33–1	Tony Harrison	TKO	11 (12), 2:28	Dec 21, 2019	Toyota Arena, Ontario, California, U.S.	Won WBC light middleweight title
33	Win	32–1	Jorge Cota	KO	3 (12), 0:46	Jun 23, 2019	Mandalay Bay Events Center, Paradise, Nevada, U.S.	
32	Loss	31–1	Tony Harrison	UD	12	Dec 22, 2018	Barclays Center, New York City, New York, U.S.	Lost WBC light middleweight title
31	Win	31–0	Austin Trout	MD	12	Jun 9, 2018	Staples Center, Los Angeles, California, U.S.	Retained WBC light middleweight title
30	Win	30–0	Erickson Lubin	KO	1 (12), 2:41	Oct 14, 2017	Barclays Center, New York City, New York, U.S.	Retained WBC light middleweight title
29	Win	29–0	Charles Hatley	KO	6 (12), 0:32	Apr 22, 2017	Barclays Center, New York City, New York, U.S.	Retained WBC light middleweight title
28	Win	28–0	John Jackson	TKO	8 (12), 0:51	May 21, 2016	Cosmopolitan of Las Vegas, Paradise, Nevada, U.S.	Won vacant WBC light middleweight title
27	Win	27–0	Joachim Alcine	TKO	6 (10), 1:21	Oct 31, 2015	NRG Arena, Houston, Texas, U.S.	
26	Win	26–0	Vanes Martirosyan	UD	10	Mar 28, 2015	Pearl Concert Theater, Paradise, Nevada, U.S.	
25	Win	25–0	Miguel Alberto Lozano	UD	10	Dec 13, 2014	MGM Grand Garden Arena, Paradise, Nevada, U.S.	
24	Win	24–0	Charlie Ota	UD	12	May 24, 2014	Bell Centre, Montreal, Quebec, Canada	
23	Win	23–0	Gabriel Rosado	UD	10	Jan 25, 2014	D.C. Armory, Washington, D.C., U.S.	
22	Win	22–0	Jose Angel Rodriguez	TKO	10 (10), 1:41	Oct 14, 2013	BB&T Center, Sunrise, Florida, U.S.	
21	Win	21–0	Demetrius Hopkins	UD	12	Jun 8, 2013	Home Depot Center, Carson, California, U.S.	Won USBA light middleweight title
20	Win	20–0	Harry Joe Yorgey	KO	8 (10), 1:09	Jan 26, 2013	The Joint, Paradise, Nevada, U.S.	Won vacant WBC Continental Americas light middleweight title
19	Win	19–0	Dashon Johnson	UD	10	Nov 24, 2012	Citizens Business Bank Arena, Ontario, California, U.S.	
18	Win	18–0	Denis Douglin	KO	5 (10), 1:12	Jun 23, 2012	Staples Center, Los Angeles, California, U.S.	
17	Win	17–0	Chris Chatman	TKO	3 (10), 1:22	Mar 24, 2012	Reliant Arena, Houston, Texas, U.S.	
16	Win	16–0	Francisco Santana	UD	8	Oct 7, 2011	Texas Station, North Las Vegas, Nevada, U.S.	
15	Win	15–0	Larry Smith	UD	6	Jun 17, 2011	State Farm Arena, Hidalgo, Texas, U.S.	
14	Win	14–0	Luis Grajeda	UD	8	Nov 12, 2010	State Farm Arena, Hidalgo, Texas, U.S.	
13	Win	13–0	Quinton Whitaker	TKO	2 (8), 2:44	Aug 6, 2010	Don Haskins Center, El Paso, Texas, U.S.	
12	Win	12–0	Adan Murillo	TKO	1 (6), 1:03	Jun 18, 2010	Convention Center, McAllen, Texas, U.S.	
11	Win	11–0	Gerardo Cesar Prieto	UD	8	Mar 27, 2010	The Joint, Paradise, Nevada, U.S.	
10	Win	10–0	Abdon Lozano	KO	2 (6), 2:11	Dec 12, 2009	UIC Pavilion, Chicago, Illinois, U.S.	
9	Win	9–0	Vito Gasparyan	UD	6	Aug 22, 2009	Toyota Center, Houston, Texas, U.S.	
8	Win	8–0	Federico Flores Jr.	TKO	8 (8), 0:42	Jun 26, 2009	Desert Diamond Casino, Tucson, Arizona, U.S.	
7	Win	7–0	Carlos Garcia	UD	6	Apr 4, 2009	Frank Erwin Center, Austin, Texas, U.S.	
6	Win	6–0	Juan Serrano	UD	4	Feb 28, 2009	Toyota Center, Houston, Texas, U.S.	
5	Win	5–0	Deon Nash	UD	6	Oct 10, 2008	Desert Diamond Casino, Tucson, Arizona, U.S.	
4	Win	4–0	Rodrigo Villarreal	TKO	4 (4), 0:15	Sep 6, 2008	Toyota Center, Houston, Texas, U.S.	
3	Win	3–0	Dwayne Jones	TKO	1 (4), 2:36	Jun 13, 2008	Sundance Square, Fort Worth, Texas, U.S.	
2	Win	2–0	Jesus Villareal	TKO	3 (4), 1:30	Apr 19, 2008	Thomas & Mack Center, Paradise, Nevada, U.S.	
1	Win	1–0	Corey Sommerville	UD	4	Dec 8, 2007	Fitzgerald's Casino and Hotel, Tunica, Mississippi, U.S.	

== Titles in boxing ==
=== Major world titles ===
- WBA (Super) light middleweight champion (154 lbs)
- WBC light middleweight champion (154 lbs) (2×)
- IBF light middleweight champion (154 lbs)
- WBO light middleweight champion (154 lbs)

=== The Ring magazine titles ===
- The Ring light middleweight champion (154 lbs)

=== Regional/International titles ===
- WBC Continental Americas light middleweight champion (154 lbs)
- USBA light middleweight champion (154 lbs)

=== Undisputed titles ===
- Undisputed light middleweight champion

== Pay-per-view bouts ==
United States
No.	Date	Fight	Buys	Network	Revenue
1	September 26, 2020	The Charlos vs. Derevyanchenko and Rosario	120,000	Showtime	$9,000,000
2	September 30, 2023	Canelo vs. Charlo	700,000	Showtime	$59,500,000
	Total sales		820,000		$68,500,000

== See also ==
- List of world light-middleweight boxing champions

== Notes ==
Sporting positions
Regional boxing titles
Vacant Title last held by James Kirkland	WBC Continental Americas light middleweight champion January 26, 2013 – June 2013; Vacated	Vacant Title next held by Julian Williams
Preceded by Demetrius Hopkins	USBA light middleweight champion June 8, 2013 – October 2013; Vacated	Vacant Title next held by Michel Soro
World boxing titles
Vacant Title last held by Floyd Mayweather Jr.	WBC light middleweight champion May 21, 2016 – December 22, 2018	Succeeded by Tony Harrison
Preceded by Tony Harrison	WBC light middleweight champion December 21, 2019 – January 26, 2024; Status changed: Champion in recess	Vacant Title next held by Sebastian Fundora
Preceded by Jeison Rosario	WBA light middleweight champion Super title September 26, 2020 – March 5, 2024; Status changed: Champion in recess	Vacant Title next held by Israil Madrimov as Champion
Preceded by Jeison Rosario	IBF light middleweight champion September 26, 2020 – November 21, 2023; Vacated	Vacant Title next held by Bakhram Murtazaliev
Vacant Title last held by Floyd Mayweather Jr.	The Ring light middleweight champion September 26, 2020 – July 13, 2024; Stripped	Vacant
Preceded by Brian Castaño	WBO light middleweight champion May 14, 2022 – September 30, 2023; Stripped	Succeeded by Tim Tszyu
Vacant Title last held by Winky Wright	Undisputed light middleweight champion May 14, 2022 – September 30, 2023; Titles fragmented	Vacant
Awards
Previous: Carl Frampton	PBC Fighter of the Year; 2017	Next: Jarrett Hurd
Previous: Nonito Donaire	PBC Fighter of the Year; 2022	Next: Canelo Álvarez
