= Charlie Ota =

American boxer

Personal information
- Born: Charles Bellamy; August 24, 1981 (age 44) New York, New York, U.S.
- Height: 5 ft 7 in (170 cm)
- Weight: Light middleweight

Boxing career
- Reach: 72 in (183 cm)
- Stance: Orthodox

Boxing record
- Total fights: 31
- Wins: 26
- Win by KO: 17
- Losses: 3
- Draws: 2

Charlie Ota (born Charles Bellamy; 24 August 1981) is an American professional boxer, who held the OPBF light middleweight title between 2010 and 2013.

== Career ==
Ota is a former U.S. Navy serviceman. Towards the end of his tour in Yokosuka, he joined a boxing gym in Hachiouji as a way to stay in shape. He participated in a Japanese national amateur tournament, where he did well. Ota decided to stay in Japan and pursue a career in boxing.

In March 2010, Ota defeated Akio Shibata to claim the OPBF light middleweight title, as well as the Japanese national title. Ota went on to successfully defend his OPBF title eight times. Ota sought to step up and face Nobuhiro Ishida or former OPBF champion Yuki Nonaka as he pursued a world title shot but was unable to finalize a deal with either of them. In March 2012, Ota debuted in his hometown of New York at the Madison Square Garden, on the undercard of a Sergio Martínez fight. Ota defeated Gundrick King with a round 7 TKO.

In January 2014, Ota vacated his OPBF title in order to pursue a world title. It was later announced the Ota would be fighting highly touted prospect Jermell Charlo in Montreal. Ota managed to drop Charlo in round 3 but was outclassed through most of the fight, losing a unanimous decision (111-115, 109–118, 109–118). In December 2014, Ota faced Yuki Nonaka, seeking to reclaim the Japanese light middleweight title. The fight was extremely close, but the judges seemed to prefer Nonaka's sharper work over Ota's aggression, as Nonaka won a split decision (97-93, 96–95, 95–96).
