= Akio Shibata =

Japanese boxer

Akio Shibata (柴田 明雄, Shibata Akio; born 19 November 1981 in Yokohama, Japan) is a Japanese professional boxer who held OPBF and Japanese national titles at light middleweight and middleweight, with his middleweight reign stretching between 2013 and 2016. Shibata started his career with a lackluster 9-5-1 but in November 2009, he beat Yuki Nonaka to become OPBF and Japanese champion at light middleweight. He lost the crown on his next fight to Charlie Ota. Ota would also beat him in a rematch, both times by stoppage. Shibata went on to become OPBF and Japanese champion at middleweight. He lost to Olympic medalist Ryōta Murata in a non-title fight, but he made four successful defenses of his titles between 2013 and 2016. Shibata retired following a stoppage loss to Hikaru Nishida.
