= Bakhram Murtazaliev =

Russian boxer (born 1993)

Personal information
- Nickname: Murda
- Born: Bakhram Sait-Khamzatovich Murtazaliev; 2 January 1993 (age 33) Grozny, Chechnya, Russia
- Height: 6 ft 0 in (183 cm)
- Weight: Light-middleweight

Boxing career
- Reach: 72 in (183 cm)
- Stance: Orthodox

Boxing record
- Total fights: 24
- Wins: 23
- Win by KO: 17
- Losses: 1

Bakhram Sait-Khamzatovich Murtazaliev (Russian: Бахрам Сайт-Хамзатович Муртазалиев; born 2 January 1993) is a Russian professional boxer who held the International Boxing Federation (IBF) light-middleweight title from 2024 to 2026.

== Professional career ==
On 17 July 2021, Murtazaliev defeated Khiary Gray by unanimous decision at AT&T Center in San Antonio, Texas, USA.

=== IBF super-welterweight championship ===
On 6 April 2024, Murtazaliev knocked out Jack Culcay in the 11th round of their fight for the vacant IBF light-middleweight title at Stadthalle in Falkensee, Germany.

==== Murtazaliev vs. Tszyu ====
Tim Tszyu was expected to make his ring return on 22 September 2024 in Australia, battling it out in the IBF super welterweight title eliminator. On 3 September 2024, it was announced that Tszyu would challenge Murtazaliev for his IBF super-welterweight title on 19 October 2024 at Caribe Royale in Orlando, Florida, USA. Murtazaliev won by third round stoppage in a fight where Tszyu was knocked to the canvas four times before his corner threw in the towel to end the contest.

==== Murtazaliev vs. Kelly ====
Murtazaliev was scheduled to defend his title for the second time against Josh Kelly at Newcastle Arena in Newcastle, England, on 31 January 2026. He lost by majority decision with the judges' scorecards reading 111–115, 113–114 and 113–113.

== Professional boxing record ==
24 fights	23 wins	1 loss
By knockout	17	0
By decision	6	1

No.	Result	Record	Opponent	Type	Round, time	Date	Location	Notes
24	Loss	23–1	Josh Kelly	MD	12	31 Jan 2026	Newcastle Arena, Newcastle upon Tyne, England	Lost IBF light-middleweight title
23	Win	23–0	Tim Tszyu	TKO	3 (12), 1:55	19 Oct 2024	Caribe Royale, Orlando, Florida, U.S.	Retained IBF light-middleweight title
22	Win	22–0	Jack Culcay	KO	11 (12), 2:50	6 Apr 2024	Stadthalle, Falkensee, Germany	Won vacant IBF light-middleweight title
21	Win	21–0	Roberto Valenzuela Jr.	UD	8	17 Dec 2022	The Cosmopolitan, Paradise, Nevada, U.S.	
20	Win	20–0	Ahmad Cheikho	TKO	1 (10), 1:10	26 Mar 2022	Armory, Minneapolis, Minnesota, U.S.	
19	Win	19–0	Khiary Gray	UD	8	17 Jul 2021	AT&T Center, San Antonio, Texas, U.S.	
18	Win	18–0	Manny Woods	TKO	4 (10)	26 Sep 2020	Mohegan Sun Arena, Uncasville, Connecticut, U.S.	
17	Win	17–0	Jorge Fortea	UD	12	2 Nov 2019	MGM Grand Garden Arena, Paradise, Nevada, U.S.	Won vacant EBP light-middleweight title
16	Win	16–0	Bruno Leonardo Romay	TKO	1 (10), 1:50	18 Apr 2019	Colosseum Sport Hall, Grozny, Russia	
15	Win	15–0	Elvin Ayala	TKO	9 (10), 2:05	2 Feb 2019	Ford Center at The Star, Frisco, Texas, U.S.	Retained WBC USA light-middleweight title
14	Win	14–0	Norberto González	UD	10	13 Oct 2018	The Joint, Paradise, Nevada, U.S.	Won vacant WBC USA light-middleweight title
13	Win	13–0	Fernando Carcamo	KO	1 (10), 0:41	4 Aug 2018	Etess Arena, Atlantic City, New Jersey, U.S.	
12	Win	12–0	Kenneth McNeil	TKO	5 (10), 2:08	3 Mar 2018	MSG Theater, New York City, New York, U.S.	
11	Win	11–0	Carlos Galvan	TKO	5 (10), 1:35	25 Nov 2017	MSG Theater, New York City, New York, U.S.	
10	Win	10–0	Robson Assis	TKO	1 (6), 1:14	5 Oct 2017	Mohegan Sun Arena, Uncasville, Connecticut, U.S.	
9	Win	9–0	Alex Sandro Duarte	TKO	1 (6), 1:33	17 Jun 2017	Mandalay Bay Events Center, Paradise, Nevada, U.S.	
8	Win	8–0	Josue Obando	KO	4 (6), 2:46	27 Jan 2017	Sportsmen's Lodge, Los Angeles, California, U.S.	
7	Win	7–0	Botirsher Obidov	KO	2 (8), 2:52	19 Nov 2016	T-Mobile Arena, Paradise, Nevada, U.S.	
6	Win	6–0	Magomedkamil Musaev	TKO	2 (6), 0:40	11 Jul 2016	DIVS, Yekaterinburg, Russia	
5	Win	5–0	Artem Vychkin	TKO	3 (6), 1:20	22 Apr 2015	Almaz, Chelyabinsk, Russia	
4	Win	4–0	Mikhail Krinitsyn	UD	6	29 Jan 2015	Markstadt, Chelyabinsk, Russia	
3	Win	3–0	Andriy Danichkin	TKO	2 (6), 1:40	22 Aug 2014	Victory Garden, Chelyabinsk, Russia	
2	Win	2–0	Andrey Tylilyuk	TKO	1 (4), 2:33	26 Jun 2014	Markstadt, Chelyabinsk, Russia	
1	Win	1–0	Vasif Mamedov	UD	4	31 May 2014	Central Stadium, Chelyabinsk, Russia	

== See also ==
- List of world light-middleweight boxing champions

Sporting positions
Regional boxing titles
Vacant Title last held by Neeco Macias	WBC USA light-middleweight champion 13 October 2018 – 2019; Vacated	Vacant Title next held by Madiyar Ashkeyev
Vacant Title last held by Aram Amirkhanyan	EBP light-middleweight champion 2 November – 2019; Vacated	Vacant Title next held by Alan Khugaev
World boxing titles
Vacant Title last held by Jermell Charlo	IBF light-middleweight champion 6 April 2024 – 31 January 2026	Succeeded by Josh Kelly
