= Jeison Rosario =

Dominican Republic boxer (born 1995)

Personal information
- Nickname: Banana
- Nationality: Dominican
- Born: Jeison Manuel Rosario Bastardo; 7 April 1995 (age 31) Santo Domingo, Dominican Republic
- Height: 5 ft 11 in (180 cm)
- Weight: Welterweight; Light middleweight; Middleweight

Boxing career
- Reach: 70 in (178 cm)
- Stance: Orthodox

Boxing record
- Total fights: 31
- Wins: 24
- Win by KO: 18
- Losses: 5
- Draws: 2

Jeison Manuel Rosario Bastardo (Spanish pronunciation: [ˈxejson roˈsaɾjo]; born 7 April 1995) is a Dominican professional boxer who held the unified WBA (Super) and IBF light middleweight titles in 2020.

== Professional career ==
=== Rosario vs. Williams ===
Rosario compiled a record of 19–1–1 before facing and defeating Julian Williams to win the WBA (Super), IBF, and IBO light middleweight titles.

=== Rosario vs. Charlo ===
In his next bout, Rosario faced Jermell Charlo for the WBC and vacant The Ring super welterweight championship. Rosario was knocked down by Charlo with a left jab in the eight round and was unable to get up, earning Charlo the KO victory.

=== Rosario vs. Lubin ===
In his next fight, Rosario faced Erickson Lubin, who was ranked #1 by the WBC and #6 by The Ring at super-welterweight. Lubin won the fight by KO after dropping Rosario twice in the sixth round.

=== Rosario vs. Ramos ===
Rosario faced Jesus Ramos in a 10-round super welterweight bout at T-Mobile Arena in Las Vegas on February 1, 2025. He lost by technical knockout in the eighth round.

== Professional boxing record ==
31 fights	24 wins	5 losses
By knockout	18	5
By decision	4	0
By disqualification	2	0
Draws	2	

No.	Result	Record	Opponent	Type	Round	Date	Location	Notes
31	Loss	24–5–2	Jesus Ramos	TKO	8 (10), 2:18	Feb 1, 2025	T-Mobile Arena, Paradise, Nevada, U.S.	
30	Draw	24–4–2	Jarrett Hurd	SD	10	Aug 21, 2024	ProBox TV Events Center, Plant City, Florida, U.S.	
29	Win	24–4–1	Valerio Nina	TKO	2 (10), 1:10	Nov 10, 2023	Pabellon de Esgrima, Santo Domingo, Dominican Republic	
28	Loss	23–4–1	Brian Mendoza	KO	5 (10), 0:35	5 Nov 2022	Minneapolis Armory, Minneapolis, Minnesota, US	
27	Win	23–3–1	Francisco Ernesto Sanchez	TKO	2 (10), 3:00	10 Jul 2022	Club de Villa Francisca, Santo Domingo, Dominican Republic	
26	Win	22–3–1	Jesus Perez	TKO	4 (10), 2:14	20 Feb 2022	Pabellon de Esgrima, Santo Domingo, Dominican Republic	
25	Win	21–3–1	Reinaldo Gonzalez	TKO	2 (10), 2:39	21 Nov 2021	Pabellon de Esgrima, Santo Domingo, Dominican Republic	
24	Loss	20–3–1	Erickson Lubin	KO	6 (12), 1:42	26 Jun 2021	State Farm Arena, Atlanta, Georgia, US	For WBC Silver light middleweight title
23	Loss	20–2–1	Jermell Charlo	KO	8 (12), 0:21	26 Sep 2020	Mohegan Sun Arena, Montville, Connecticut, US	Lost WBA (Super) and IBF light middleweight titles; For WBC and vacant The Ring light middleweight titles
22	Win	20–1–1	Julian Williams	TKO	5 (12), 1:37	18 Jan 2020	Liacouras Center, Philadelphia, Pennsylvania, US	Won WBA (Super), IBF, and IBO light middleweight titles
21	Win	19–1–1	Jorge Cota	SD	10	20 Apr 2019	Dignity Health Sports Park, Carson, California, US	
20	Win	18–1–1	Mark Anthony Hernandez	TKO	9 (10), 2:45	23 Feb 2019	Minneapolis Armory, Minneapolis, Minnesota, US	
19	Win	17–1–1	Juan Carlos Rodríguez	KO	3 (10), 1:47	30 Nov 2018	Hotel Dominican Fiesta, Santo Domingo, Dominican Republic	
18	Win	16–1–1	Jamontay Clark	UD	10	24 Aug 2018	Minneapolis Armory, Minneapolis, Minnesota, US	
17	Win	15–1–1	Justin DeLoach	UD	10	26 May 2018	Beau Rivage Resort & Casino, Biloxi, Mississippi, US	
16	Draw	14–1–1	Mark Anthony Hernandez	SD	6	17 Feb 2018	Don Haskins Center, El Paso, Texas, US	
15	Win	14–1	Salim Larbi	TKO	5 (8), 2:58	8 Sep 2017	The Joint, Las Vegas, Nevada, US	
14	Win	13–1	David Antonio Nunez	TKO	2 (6), 2:27	24 Jun 2017	Hotel Jaragua, Santo Domingo, Dominican Republic	
13	Loss	12–1	Nathaniel Gallimore	TKO	6 (10), 2:15	29 Apr 2017	Sam's Town Hotel & Gambling Hall, Las Vegas, Nevada, US	
12	Win	12–0	Carlos Rafael Cruz	KO	2 (10), 2:04	23 Sep 2016	Salon de Eventos P. C. Sambil, Santo Domingo, Dominican Republic	
11	Win	11–0	Rafael Lorenzo	TKO	2 (10), 2:35	15 Apr 2016	Hotel Jaragua, Santo Domingo, Dominican Republic	
10	Win	10–0	Euri González	TKO	3 (9), 2:47	19 Nov 2015	Salón la Fiesta, Hotel Jaragua, Santo Domingo, Dominican Republic	Won vacant WBA Fedecaribe light middleweight title
9	Win	9–0	Rafael Lorenzo	KO	1 (6), 1:43	18 Apr 2015	Coliseo Carlos 'Teo' Cruz, Santo Domingo, Dominican Republic	
8	Win	8–0	Jose Vidal Soto	TKO	2 (10), 2:08	29 Nov 2014	Polideportivo, Villa Altagracia, Dominican Republic	Won vacant Dominican Republic welterweight title
7	Win	7–0	Rafael De la Cruz	TKO	2 (6), 0:45	27 Sep 2014	Coliseo Pedro Julio Nolasco, La Romana, Dominican Republic	
6	Win	6–0	Joselito Del Rosario	DQ	2 (6), 0:53	26 Jul 2014	Club María Auxiliadora, Santo Domingo, Dominican Republic	
5	Win	5–0	Raidy Martinez	DQ	1 (6), 1:00	2 Feb 2014	Polideportivo, Villa Altagracia, Dominican Republic	
4	Win	4–0	Franklin Frias	UD	4	16 Dec 2013	Casa de Los Clubes, Villa Juana, Dominican Republic	
3	Win	3–0	Alexis Rafael Castillo	KO	3 (6), 1:31	28 Sep 2013	Bánica, Dominican Republic	
2	Win	2–0	Victor Moya	TKO	2 (4), 0:51	9 Aug 2013	Club Luperon, Santo Domingo, Dominican Republic	
1	Win	1–0	Confesor Guzman	TKO	1 (4), 2:19	18 May 2013	Club Mauricio Baez, Santo Domingo, Dominican Republic	

== See also ==
- List of world light-middleweight boxing champions

Sporting positions
Regional boxing titles
Vacant Title last held by Melvin Betancourt	Dominican Republic welterweight champion 29 November 2014 – 2015	Vacant Title next held by Ranses Payano
Vacant Title last held by Alfonso Blanco	WBA Fedacarabine light middleweight champion 19 November 2015 – 2016	Vacant Title next held by Wilky Campfort
Minor world boxing titles
Preceded by Julian Williams	IBO light middleweight champion 18 January – 1 April 2020; Vacated	Vacant Title next held by Erislandy Lara
Major world boxing titles
Preceded by Julian Williams	WBA light middleweight champion Super title 18 January 2020 – 26 September 2020	Succeeded by Jermell Charlo
Preceded by Julian Williams	IBF light middleweight champion 18 January 2020 – 26 September 2020	Succeeded by Jermell Charlo
