= Erickson Lubin =

American boxer (born 1995)

Personal information
- Nickname: The Hammer
- Born: Erickson Lubin; October 1, 1995 (age 31) Orlando, Florida, U.S.
- Height: 5 ft 9 1/2 in (177 cm)
- Weight: Light middleweight

Boxing career
- Reach: 74 1/2 in (189 cm)
- Stance: Southpaw

Boxing record
- Total fights: 30
- Wins: 27
- Win by KO: 19
- Losses: 3

Erickson Lubin (born October 1, 1995) is an American professional boxer who challenged for the WBC super welterweight title in 2017. As of January 2022, he is ranked as the world's fourth best active super welterweight by The Ring magazine seventh by BoxRec, and third by the Transnational Boxing Rankings Board.

== Early life and amateur career ==
Lubin was born to Haitian parents Erick Lubin and Marjorie in Orlando, Florida where he grew up as idolizing Oscar De La Hoya and other boxers. Lubin won the 2013 Golden Gloves as a welterweight. He was expected to qualify for the 2016 Olympics but turned professional instead.

Lubin had a record of 143–7.

== Professional career ==
Lubin made his professional debut in November 2013.

=== Lubin vs. Cota ===
After 17 wins, 12 of them by way of knockout, Lubin faced Jorge Cota in a WBC super welterweight title eliminator. The fight was scheduled for 4 March 2017 as a co-feature to Keith Thurman-Danny García. Cota went down on the fourth round, he would rise but the referee deemed him unable to continue. With the win, Lubin became Jermell Charlo's mandatory challenger.

=== Lubin vs. Charlo ===
On August 24, RingTV announced that the fight between Jermell Charlo and Lubin would take place on October 14 at the Barclays Center in Brooklyn, New York. The fight card would also feature Erislandy Lara defending his WBA title against Terrell Gausha and Jarrett Hurd defending his IBF title against Austin Trout, with the event being billed as a super welterweight triple-header. Charlo made swift work of Lubin, knocking him out toward the end of the first round, as Lubin dipped directly into a right uppercut in an attempt to dodge a left jab.

Lubin rebounded from his loss to Charlo with a series of wins.

=== Lubin vs. Gallimore ===
On October 26, 2019, Lubin fought Nathaniel Gallimore and defeated him via unanimous decision, winning 99–91 on all three scorecards.

=== Lubin vs. Gausha ===
On September 19, 2020, he captured the vacant WBC Silver super welterweight title with a 12-round unanimous decision victory against former world title challenger Terrell Gausha, who was ranked #6 by the WBA at super welterweight, winning with scores of 115–113, 116–112, and 118–110.

=== Lubin vs. Rosario ===
On June 26, 2021, Lubin prevailed in a WBC final eliminator against former unified world champion Jeison Rosario with a sixth-round knockout victory. Rosario was ranked #3 by the WBC, #6 by the WBA, #10 by the IBF and #4 by The Ring at super welterweight.

=== Lubin vs. Fundora ===
On April 9, 2022, Lubin faced Sebastian Fundora for the vacant WBC interim super welterweight title. Although Lubin got knocked down in round 2 and returned the favor in round 7, he would lose the bout by 9th round corner retirement as his face was heavily damaged. This was a contender for 2022 Fight of the Year.

=== Lubin vs. Ramos ===
On September 30, 2023 at T-Mobile Arena in Las Vegas, Lubin defeated undefeated 22 year old prospect Jesus Ramos Jr via controversial Unanimous 12-round decision in the co-feature to Canelo Alvarez vs. Jermell Charlo.

=== Lubin vs. Ortiz ===
On November 8, 2025 Lubin lost via 2nd round TKO to Vergil Ortiz Jr. for his interim WBC super welterweight title in Fort Worth, TX.

== Professional boxing record ==
30 fights	27 wins	3 losses
By knockout	19	3
By decision	8	0

No.	Result	Record	Opponent	Type	Round, time	Date	Location	Notes
30	Loss	27–3	Vergil Ortiz Jr.	TKO	2 (12), 1:30	Nov 8, 2025	Dickies Arena, Fort Worth, Texas, USA	For WBC interim super welterweight title
29	Win	27–2	Ardreal Holmes Jr	TKO	11 (12), 2:00	May 10, 2025	Silver Spurs Arena, Kissimmee, Florida, US	
28	Win	26–2	Jesus Ramos	UD	12	Sep 30, 2023	T-Mobile Arena, Las Vegas, Nevada, US	
27	Win	25–2	Luís Arias	KO	5 (10), 2:11	Jun 24, 2023	Minneapolis Armory, Minneapolis, Minnesota, US	
26	Loss	24–2	Sebastian Fundora	RTD	9 (12), 3:00	Apr 9, 2022	Virgin Hotels, Paradise, Nevada, U.S.	For vacant WBC interim super welterweight title
25	Win	24–1	Jeison Rosario	KO	6 (12), 1:42	Jun 26, 2021	State Farm Arena, Atlanta, Georgia, U.S.	Retained WBC Silver super welterweight title
24	Win	23–1	Terrell Gausha	UD	12	Sep 19, 2020	Mohegan Sun Casino, Montville, Connecticut, U.S.	Won vacant WBC Silver super welterweight title
23	Win	22–1	Nathaniel Gallimore	UD	10	Oct 26, 2019	Santander Arena, Reading, Pennsylvania, U.S.	
22	Win	21–1	Zakaria Attou	TKO	4 (12), 1:19	Jun 29, 2019	NRG Arena, Houston, Texas, U.S.	
21	Win	20–1	Ishe Smith	RTD	3 (10), 3:00	Feb 9, 2019	Dignity Health Sports Park, Carson, California, U.S.	
20	Win	19–1	Silverio Ortiz	TKO	4 (10) 3:00	Apr 28, 2018	Don Haskins Convention Center, El Paso, Texas, U.S.	
19	Loss	18–1	Jermell Charlo	KO	1 (12), 2:41	Oct 14, 2017	Barclays Center, New York City, New York, U.S.	For WBC super welterweight title
18	Win	18–0	Jorge Cota	TKO	4 (12), 1:25	Mar 4, 2017	Barclays Center, New York City, New York, U.S.	
17	Win	17–0	Juan Ubaldo Cabrera	KO	2 (10), 2:09	Dec 10, 2016	Galen Center, Los Angeles, California, U.S.	
16	Win	16–0	Ivan Montero	UD	8	Jul 16, 2016	Legacy Arena, Birmingham, Alabama, U.S.	
15	Win	15–0	Daniel Sandoval	TKO	3 (8), 2:36	Jun 18, 2016	UIC Pavilion, Chicago, Illinois, U.S.	
14	Win	14–0	Jose De Jesus Macias	UD	10	Jan 31, 2016	Seminole Casino, Immokalee, Florida, U.S.	
13	Win	13–0	Alexis Camacho	TKO	2 (10), 0:42	Nov 28, 2015	The Bomb Factory, Dallas, Texas, U.S.	
12	Win	12–0	Orlando Lora	TKO	6 (10), 1:58	Sep 18, 2015	Full Sail University, Winter Park, Florida, U.S.	
11	Win	11–0	Ayi Bruce	KO	1 (8), 2:49	Jun 26, 2015	Little Creek Casino Resort, Shelton, Washington, U.S.	
10	Win	10–0	Kenneth Council	TKO	1 (8), 1:33	Mar 6, 2015	MGM Grand Marquee Ballroom, Paradise, Nevada, U.S.	
9	Win	9–0	Michael Finney	UD	8	Feb 6, 2015	Beau Rivage, Biloxi, Mississippi, U.S.	
8	Win	8–0	Norberto Gonzalez	UD	8	Nov 14, 2014	Consol Energy Center, Pittsburgh, Pennsylvania, U.S.	Won vacant WBC FECARBOX super welterweight title
7	Win	7–0	Francisco Javier Reza	RTD	1 (6), 3:00	Aug 8, 2014	Consol Energy Center, Pittsburgh, Pennsylvania, U.S.	
6	Win	6–0	Noe Bolanos	UD	8	Jul 10, 2014	American Airlines Arena, Miami, Florida, U.S.	
5	Win	5–0	Jovan Ramirez	KO	2 (4), 0:18	Apr 18, 2014	Convention Center, Monroeville, Pennsylvania, U.S.	
4	Win	4–0	Tirobio Ball	TKO	3 (4), 2:01	Feb 22, 2014	Sands Event Center, Bethlehem, Pennsylvania, U.S.	
3	Win	3–0	Roberto Acevedo	TKO	1 (4), 3:00	Feb 7, 2014	UIC Pavilion, Chicago, Illinois, U.S.	
2	Win	2–0	Luis Santiago	KO	1 (4), 1:01	Jan 3, 2014	Target Center, Minneapolis, Minnesota, U.S.	
1	Win	1–0	Eric De Jesus	TKO	1 (4), 0:35	Nov 26, 2013	Beau Rivage, Biloxi, Mississippi, U.S.	

Sporting positions
Amateur boxing titles
Previous: Alex Martin	Golden Gloves welterweight champion 2013	Next: Sammy Valentin
Awards
Previous: Takuma Inoue	The Ring Prospect of the Year; 2016	Next: Jaime Munguia
