= Jorge Cota =

Mexican boxer (born 1987)

Personal information
- Nickname: Demonio
- Born: Jorge Luis Cota Lugo; December 11, 1987 (age 38) Los Mochis, Sinaloa, Mexico
- Height: 1.80 m (5 ft 11 in)
- Weight: Welterweight; Light Middleweight; Middleweight

Boxing career
- Reach: 187 cm (74 in)
- Stance: Orthodox

Boxing record
- Total fights: 38
- Wins: 31
- Win by KO: 28
- Losses: 7

Jorge Cota (born December 11, 1987) is a Mexican professional boxer. He has competed in many weight classes, most notably the light middleweight division.

== Professional career ==
In November 2010, Cota beat the veteran Daniel Eduardo Yocupicio by T.K.O. in the fourth round, the bout was held at Guaymas, Sonora, Mexico. On June 23, 2019, Cota lost via third-round knockout against Jermell Charlo after being a late replacement for Tony Harrison.

== Professional boxing record ==
38 fights	31 wins	7 losses
By knockout	28	5
By decision	3	2

No.	Result	Record	Opponent	Type	Round, Time	Date	Location	Notes
38	Loss	31–7	Fiodor Czerkaszyn	TKO	5 (8), 2:52	May 24, 2024	Hala na Podpromiu, Rzeszów, Poland	
37	Win	31–6	Christian Soto Valverde	KO	5 (8), 1:19	Dec 14, 2022	Guasave, Mexico	
36	Loss	30–6	Yoelvis Gomez	UD	10	May 21, 2022	Gila River Arena, Glendale, Arizona, U.S.	
35	Loss	30–5	Sebastian Fundora	TKO	4 (12), 2:35	May 1, 2021	Dignity Health Sports Park, Carson, California, U.S.	
34	Win	30–4	Thomas LaManna	TKO	5 (10), 1:22	Jan 18, 2020	Liacouras Center, Philadelphia, Pennsylvania, U.S.	
33	Win	29–4	Cesar Chavez	KO	3 (10), 1:37	Oct 4, 2019	Salon SNTE 53, Guasave, Mexico	
32	Loss	28–4	Jermell Charlo	KO	3 (12), 0:46	Jun 23, 2019	Mandalay Bay Resort & Casino, Paradise, Nevada, U.S.	
31	Loss	28–3	Jeison Rosario	SD	10	Apr 20, 2019	Dignity Health Sports Park, Carson, California, U.S.	
30	Win	28–2	Euri González	TKO	4 (8), 2:25	Nov 30, 2018	Hotel Dominican Fiesta, Santo Domingo, Dominican Republic	
29	Win	27–2	Roberto Valdez	KO	2 (10), 1:37	Oct 20, 2017	Polideportivo Centenario, Los Mochis, Mexico	
28	Win	26–2	Fidel Damian Lopez	TKO	1 (8), 2:33	Sep 8, 2017	Polideportivo Centenario, Los Mochis, U.S.	
27	Loss	25–2	Erickson Lubin	TKO	4 (12), 1:25	Mar 4, 2017	Barclays Center, Brooklyn, New York, U.S.	
26	Win	25–1	Yudel Johnson	UD	10	Aug 2, 2015	Full Sail University, Winter Park, Florida, U.S.	
25	Win	24–1	Esau Herrera de la Cruz	TKO	7 (8), 0:48	Dec 5, 2014	Arena Union, Los Mochis, Mexico	
24	Win	23–1	Gustavo Octavio Castro	UD	8	Aug 1, 2014	Arena Union, Los Mochis, Mexico	
23	Win	22–1	Rene Fernandez Lopez	TKO	2 (8), 1:42	Dec 7, 2013	Hotel Ixtapa Azul, Zihuatanejo, Mexico	
22	Win	21–1	Humberto Flores	KO	3 (8)	Jun 22, 2013	Hotel Azul Ixtapa, Ixtapa Zihuatanejo, Mexico	
21	Win	20–1	Josue Atilano Mendoza	TKO	7 (10)	Apr 27, 2013	Gimnasio Municipal, Agua Prieta, Mexico	
20	Win	19–1	Oscar Solis	TKO	3 (6), 2:08	Jan 26, 2013	Gimnasio Manuel Bernardo Aguirre, Chihuahua, Mexico	
19	Win	18–1	Ignacio Miranda Hernandez	UD	10	Nov 17, 2012	Unidad Deportiva, Acapulco, Mexico	
18	Win	17–1	Joel Juarez Cota	TKO	3 (8)	Oct 6, 2012	Palenque de la Feria, Tepic, Mexico	
17	Loss	16–1	Marco Antonio Rubio	TKO	7 (12), 1:49	Jun 30, 2012	Auditorio Centenario, Torreón, Mexican	For vacant IBF International middleweight title
16	Win	16–0	Francisco Madrigal	KO	2 (8), 1:35	Mar 3, 2012	Gimnasio German Evers, Mazatlán, Mexico	
15	Win	15–0	Francisco Rios Amezquita	KO	5 (10)	Feb 11, 2012	Arena Union, Los Mochis, Mexico	
14	Win	14–0	Yori Boy Campas	TKO	8 (10), 2:52	Nov 19, 2011	Estadio Centenario, Los Mochis, Mexico	
13	Win	13–0	Cristian Arizmendi	KO	3 (6)	Jul 2, 2011	Centro de Usos Multiples, Hermosillo, Mexico	
12	Win	12–0	Ernesto Gomez	TKO	2 (10), 0:30	Apr 29, 2011	Polideportivo Centenario, Los Mochis, Mexico	
11	Win	11–0	Juan Manuel Hernandez	TKO	1 (6), 1:35	Feb 12, 2011	Coliseo Olimpico de la UG, Guadalajara, Mexico	
10	Win	10–0	Pedro Lopez	TKO	3 (6)	Dec 18, 2010	Estadio 20 de Noviembre, Campeche, Mexico	
9	Win	9–0	Daniel Yocupicio Mendez	KO	4 (8)	Nov 5, 2010	Guaymas, Sonora, Mexico	
8	Win	8–0	Roberto Vasquez	KO	3 (8)	Aug 7, 2010	Estadio Héctor Espino, Hermosillo, Mexico	
7	Win	7–0	Paul Rodriguez	TKO	3 (8), 2:15	Jul 24, 2010	Polideportivo Centenario, Los Mochis, Mexico	
6	Win	6–0	Guadalupe Leonardo Valdez	KO	2 (6)	Apr 24, 2010	Centro de Usos Multiples, Ciudad Obregón, Mexico	
5	Win	5–0	Luis Lopez	TKO	3 (6)	Feb 20, 2010	Dicoteca El Albrije, Acapulco, Mexico	
4	Win	4–0	Raymundo Verdugo	KO	1 (4), 1:30	Dec 4, 2009	Polideportivo Centenario, Los Mochis, Mexico	
3	Win	3–0	Juan Cortez	TKO	3 (4), 1:58	Nov 21, 2009	Palenque dela EXPOMEX, Nuevo Laredo, Mexico	
2	Win	2–0	Roberto Verdugo	TKO	2 (4)	Jul 31, 2009	Polideportivo Centenario, Los Mochis, Mexico	
1	Win	1–0	Sergio Mendez Lopez	KO	2 (4), 0:27	Jun 27, 2009	Plaza de Toros, Nuevo Laredo, Mexico	
