= Julian Williams (boxer) =

American boxer (born 1990)

Personal information
- Nickname: J Rock
- Born: Julian Taige Williams; April 5, 1990 (age 36) Philadelphia, Pennsylvania, U.S.
- Height: 5 ft 10 in (178 cm)
- Weight: Light middleweight; Middleweight

Boxing career
- Reach: 72 1/2 in (184 cm)
- Stance: Orthodox

Boxing record
- Total fights: 36
- Wins: 29
- Win by KO: 17
- Losses: 5
- Draws: 1
- No contests: 1

Julian "J-Rock" Williams (born April 5, 1990) is an American professional boxer. He held the WBA (Super), IBF, and IBO light middleweight titles from 2019 to 2020.

== Amateur career ==
Williams started boxing at the age of 12. He had an amateur record of 77-10. He reached number five in the rankings at national level, although never won a national tournament. Williams' trainer, Stephen Edwards, said that Williams' preparation as an amateur boxer was erratic, so began working on a more rigorous training regime as Williams turned pro.

== Professional career ==
Williams made his professional debut in May 2010, beating Antonio Chaves Fernandez technical knockout (TKO) in the first round. In April 2013, Williams became the second fighter to stop journeyman Dashon Johnson, improving his record to 12–0–1 with a third-round TKO. In his next fight, Williams won a unanimous decision (77-72, 77-72, 77-72) over former world champion Joachim Alcine. Alcine was dropped three times, but he rallied and won the final three rounds, landing significant shots on Williams. The prospect would survive and take the win. Williams next faced fellow prospect Hugo Centeno Jr., but the fight ended in a no contest after an accidental headbutt.

On 10 December 2016, Williams challenged IBF champion Jermall Charlo. Charlo retained his title with a fifth-round stoppage of Williams. Charlo dropped Williams in the second round with a powerful jab. Williams came back and fought a clever fight, making Charlo miss, slipping punches, and landing some good counters. In round five, Charlo landed a right uppercut, dropping Williams hard. Williams got up, however Charlo went for the finish, and got it with a third knockdown after a barrage of punches ending with a left hook. After the referee stopped the fight, Williams went over to congratulate Charlo. Charlo didn't want to embrace and told Williams, “I don’t want your congratulations, I want your apology.” The crowd, noticing the heat between the two corners, started to boo Charlo. In the post fight interview, Charlo stated Williams had disrespected him leading up to the fight.

On 11 May 2019, Williams beat Jarrett Hurd by unanimous decision for the unified light middleweight championship. In an early fight of the year candidate, both fighters went at war, but it was Williams who managed to drop Hurd in the second round, and got the better of him throughout the fight.

In the first time defending his belts, Williams faced Jeison Rosario, who was ranked #5 by the IBF and #9 by the WBA, at the Liacouras Center in Philadelphia, Pennsylvania, on January 18, 2020. Williams boxed well in the beginning, but Rosario looked like the bigger man and was holding up well to Williams' attacks. In the fifth round, Rosario dominated Williams, shaking Williams up badly and forcing the referee to stop the fight to get the win.

Williams faced Yoenis Tellez for the WBA interim light-middleweight title at the Barclays Center in Brooklyn, New York, on March 1, 2025, losing via unanimous decision.

== Personal life ==
Julian was raised in West Philadelphia and is a Muslim.

== Professional boxing record ==
36 fights	29 wins	5 losses
By knockout	17	3
By decision	12	2
Draws	1	
No contests	1	

No.	Result	Record	Opponent	Type	Round, time	Date	Location	Notes
36	Loss	29–5–1 (1)	Yoenis Tellez	UD	12	Mar 1, 2025	Barclays Center, New York City, New York, U.S.	For vacant WBA interim light-middleweight title
35	Win	29–4–1 (1)	Gustavo David Vittori	TKO	2 (8), 0:43	Jan 12, 2024	Showboat Hotel, Atlantic City, New Jersey, U.S.	
34	Loss	28–4–1 (1)	Carlos Adames	TKO	9 (12), 2:45	Jun 24, 2023	Armory, Minneapolis, Minnesota, U.S.	For WBC interim middleweight title
33	Win	28–3–1 (1)	Rolando Mansilla	UD	8	Nov 5, 2022	Armory, Minneapolis, Minnesota, U.S	
32	Loss	27–3–1 (1)	Vladimir Hernandez	SD	10	Oct 9, 2021	T-Mobile Arena, Paradise, Nevada, U.S.	
31	Loss	27–2–1 (1)	Jeison Rosario	TKO	5 (12), 1:37	Jan 18, 2020	Liacouras Center, Philadelphia, Pennsylvania, U.S	Lost WBA (Super), IBF, and IBO light-middleweight titles
30	Win	27–1–1 (1)	Jarrett Hurd	UD	12	May 11, 2019	EagleBank Arena, Fairfax, Virginia, U.S.	Won WBA (Super), IBF, and IBO light-middleweight titles
29	Win	26–1–1 (1)	Francisco Castro	KO	2 (8), 2:40	Dec 1, 2018	Staples Center, Los Angeles, California, U.S.	
28	Win	25–1–1 (1)	Nathaniel Gallimore	MD	12	Apr 7, 2018	Hard Rock Hotel & Casino, Paradise, Nevada, U.S.	
27	Win	24–1–1 (1)	Ishe Smith	UD	10	Nov 18, 2017	Cosmopolitan of Las Vegas, Paradise, Nevada, U.S.	
26	Win	23–1–1 (1)	Joshua Conley	TKO	7 (10), 0:58	Jun 30, 2017	Huntington Center, Toledo, Ohio, U.S.	
25	Loss	22–1–1 (1)	Jermall Charlo	KO	5 (12), 2:06	Dec 10, 2016	Galen Center, Los Angeles, California, U.S.	For IBF light-middleweight title
24	Win	22–0–1 (1)	Marcello Matano	TKO	7 (12), 2:24	Mar 5, 2016	Sands Casino Resort, Bethlehem, Pennsylvania, U.S.	
23	Win	21–0–1 (1)	Luciano Cuello	TKO	1 (10), 1:33	Sep 22, 2015	Sands Casino Resort, Bethlehem, Pennsylvania, U.S.	Retained WBC Continental Americas light-middleweight title
22	Win	20–0–1 (1)	Arman Ovsepyan	TKO	6 (10), 2:43	Jun 13, 2015	Bartow Arena, Birmingham, Alabama, U.S.	Retained WBC Continental Americas light-middleweight title
21	Win	19–0–1 (1)	Joey Hernandez	UD	10	Apr 4, 2015	Colisée Pepsi, Quebec City, Canada	
20	Win	18–0–1 (1)	Jamar Freeman	TKO	8 (10), 0:29	Dec 20, 2014	Little Creek Casino Resort, Shelton, Washington, U.S.	Won vacant WBC Continental Americas light-middleweight title
19	Win	17–0–1 (1)	Eliezer Gonzalez	UD	8	Sep 11, 2014	Hard Rock Hotel & Casino, Paradise, Nevada, U.S.	
18	Win	16–0–1 (1)	Michael Medina	KO	8 (10), 1:59	May 24, 2014	Bell Centre, Montreal, Canada	
17	Win	15–0–1 (1)	Freddy Hernández	TKO	3 (10), 0:35	Mar 17, 2014	House of Blues, Boston, Massachusetts, U.S.	
16	Win	14–0–1 (1)	Orlando Lora	TKO	3 (10), 0:34	Dec 7, 2013	Barclays Center, New York City, New York, U.S.	
15	NC	13–0–1 (1)	Hugo Centeno Jr.	NC	4 (10), 0:59	Sep 12, 2013	MGM Grand Premier Ballroom, Paradise, Nevada, U.S.	For vacant WBC International light-middleweight title
14	Win	13–0–1	Joachim Alcine	UD	8	Jun 22, 2013	Barclays Center, New York City, New York, U.S.	
13	Win	12–0–1	Dashon Johnson	TKO	3 (6), 1:43	Apr 20, 2013	Alamodome, San Antonio, Texas, U.S.	
12	Win	11–0–1	Jeremiah Wiggins	TKO	7 (8), 1:05	Jan 26, 2013	Hard Rock Hotel & Casino, Paradise, Nevada, U.S.	
11	Win	10–0–1	Jonel Tapia	TKO	7 (8), 2:10	Nov 17, 2012	Boardwalk Hall, Atlantic City, New Jersey, U.S.	
10	Win	9–0–1	Hector Rosario	UD	8	Apr 28, 2012	Boardwalk Hall, Atlantic City, New Jersey, U.S.	
9	Win	8–0–1	Eberto Medina	UD	6	Sep 30, 2011	National Guard Armory, Philadelphia, Pennsylvania, U.S.	
8	Win	7–0–1	Raul Rodriguez	UD	6	Jul 22, 2011	Morongo Casino, Resort & Spa, Cabazon, California, U.S.	
7	Draw	6–0–1	Francisco Santana	PTS	6	May 13, 2011	Chumash Casino Resort, Santa Ynez, California, U.S.	
6	Win	6–0	Marteze Logan	UD	4	Mar 19, 2011	Fitzgerald's Casino & Hotel, Tunica, Mississippi, U.S.	
5	Win	5–0	Allan Moore	TKO	1 (4), 0:28	Jan 29, 2011	Silverdome, Pontiac, Michigan, U.S.	
4	Win	4–0	Mario Evangelista	UD	6	Dec 3, 2010	Chumash Casino Resort, Santa Ynez, California, U.S.	
3	Win	3–0	Wes Parkhurst	TKO	1 (4), 1:27	Nov 9, 2010	Remington Park, Oklahoma City, Oklahoma, U.S.	
2	Win	2–0	Dean Peters Jr.	TKO	1 (4), 0:24	Oct 1, 2010	Chumash Casino Resort, Santa Ynez, California, U.S.	
1	Win	1–0	Antonio Chaves	TKO	1 (4), 1:00	May 7, 2010	2300 Arena, Philadelphia, Pennsylvania, U.S.	

== See also ==
- List of male boxers
- List of world light-middleweight boxing champions

Sporting positions
Regional boxing titles
Vacant Title last held by Jermell Charlo	WBC Continental Americas light-middleweight champion December 20, 2014 – 2016; Won interim title	Vacant Title next held by Eric Walker
Minor world boxing titles
Preceded by Jarrett Hurd	IBO light-middleweight champion May 11, 2019 – January 18, 2020	Succeeded by Jeison Rosario
Major world boxing titles
Preceded by Jarrett Hurd	WBA light-middleweight champion Super title May 11, 2019 – January 18, 2020	Succeeded by Jeison Rosario
Preceded by Jarrett Hurd	IBF light-middleweight champion May 11, 2019 – January 18, 2020	Succeeded by Jeison Rosario
