= Artemio =

Artemio is a given name. Notable people with the name include:

- Artemio Franchi (1922–1983), Italian football administrator
- Artemio Lomboy Rillera (1947–2011), the Roman Catholic bishop of San Fernando de La Union, Philippines
- Artemio Panganiban (born 1936), the 21st Supreme Court Chief Justice of the Philippines
- Artemio Reyes (born 1986), Mexican-American professional boxer in the Light Welterweight division
- Artemio Ricarte (1866–1945), Filipino general during the Philippine Revolution and the Philippine–American War
- Artêmio Sarcinelli (1932–2006), Brazilian footballer
- Comrade Artemio, former leader of the Shining Path, a Maoist guerrilla group in Peru

== See also ==
- Artemio Franchi Trophy, competition between the champions of the European Football Championship and the Copa América
- BRP Artemio Ricarte (PS-37), one of the three Jacinto class of corvettes in the Philippine Navy
- Stadio Artemio Franchi, football stadium in Florence, Italy
- Stadio Artemio Franchi – Montepaschi Arena, multi-purpose stadium in Siena, Italy
- The Death of Artemio Cruz (Spanish: La muerte de Artemio Cruz) is a novel written in 1962 by Mexican writer Carlos Fuentes
