= Miguel Cotto vs. Austin Trout =

2012 boxing match

Showdown
- Date: December 1, 2012
- Venue: Madison Square Garden, New York City, New York, U.S.
- Title(s) on the line: WBA (Regular) super welterweight title

Tale of the tape
Boxer	Austin Trout	Miguel Cotto
Nickname	No Doubt	Junito
Hometown	Las Cruces, New Mexico, U.S.	Caguas, Puerto Rico
Purse	$240,000	$1,000,000
Pre-fight record	25–0 (14 KO)	37–3 (30 KO)
Age	27 years, 2 months	32 years, 1 month
Height	5 ft 9 1/2 in (177 cm)	5 ft 7 in (170 cm)
Weight	154 lb (70 kg)	154 1/2 lb (70 kg)
Style	Southpaw	Orthodox
Recognition	WBA (Regular); Super Welterweight Champion; The Ring; No. 4 Ranked Light middleweight	WBA; No. 1 Ranked Light Middleweight; The Ring; No. 2 Ranked Light middleweight 3-division world champion

Result
- Trout wins via 12–round unanimous decision (119–109, 117–111, 117–111)

Miguel Cotto vs. Austin Trout, billed as Showdown, was a professional boxing match contested on December 1, 2012 for the WBA (Regular) super welterweight title.

== Background ==
After losing the "super" version of the WBA super welterweight title to Floyd Mayweather Jr. in May 2012, Miguel Cotto announced his return to the ring at the beginning of September to challenge Austin Trout, the holder of the "regular" WBA super welterweight title, on 1 December at Madison Square Garden, in what would be his eighth fight at the venue where he was a perfect 7–0. Before settling on Trout, Cotto and his camp had discussions with Manny Pacquiao about a rematch of their 2009 fight, but the two sides could not agree on what weight the fight would be held at and Cotto instead pivoted to Trout.

The featured undercard bout was originally scheduled to feature reigning IBF featherweight champion Billy Dib defending his crown against undefeated prospect Jayson Vélez, who was promoted by Cotto. However, the fight was cancelled when Dib's promoter, rapper Curtis "50 Cent" Jackson, had a falling out with Mayweather Jr., who was then co-promoted by Golden Boy Promotions, who were also co-promoting the Cotto–Trout fight. As a result of the rift between Mayweather and 50 Cent, Golden Boy Promotions and Mayweather's manager Al Haymon allegedly pressured Showtime to drop Dib from the card. Showtime relented and Dib was subsequently replaced with Salvador Sánchez II.

Prior to the televised event, a memorial 10-count was held for Puerto Rican boxing legend Héctor Camacho. Camacho, who had been raised in New York City, had been shot and killed in his native Puerto Rico roughly a week before on November 24, 2012.

Trout was ranked as the 7th best Light middleweight by TBRB with Cotto ranked 2nd.

== Fight Details ==
Despite entering the fight as an underdog and Cotto's perceived home advantage, Trout cruised to a lopsided unanimous decision winning all but one round on one official scorecard (119–109), while taking the other two scorecards 117–111 (nine rounds to three). Trout got off to a good start, wobbling Cotto with a left in the first round and winning the first two rounds decisively. Cotto performed better in the third and took three of the next four rounds on two of the judge's scorecards, but Trout regained control in the seventh and won every round but one on the scorecards thereafter to take the victory.

Using his height and reach advantage, Trout kept Cotto at bay for most of the fight and landed more jabs (46 to 29), power punches (192 to 154) and overall punches (238 to 183).

== Fight card ==
Confirmed bouts:

Weight Class	Weight		vs.		Method	Round	Time	Notes
Super Welterweight	154 lbs.	Austin Trout (c)	def.	Miguel Cotto	UD	12		^{note 1}
Featherweight	126 lbs.	Jayson Vélez	def.	Salvador Sánchez II	TKO	3/10	0:38	^{note 2}
Super Lightweight	140 lbs.	Michael Perez	def.	Fernando Carcamo	UD	8
Super Middleweight	168 lbs.	Daniel Jacobs	def.	Chris Fitzpatrick	RTD	5/8	3:00
Middleweight	160 lbs.	Jorge Melendez	def.	James Winchester	TKO	4/8	0:54
Light Middleweight	154 lbs.	Eddie Gomez	def.	Luis Hernandez	UD	6
Featherweight	126 lbs.	Jorge Diaz	def.	Victor Sanchez	UD	6
Lightweight	135 lbs.	Jeffrey Fontanez	def.	Pedro Arcos	TKO	2/6	1:23
Middleweight	160 lbs.	John Thompson	def.	Elie Augustama	UD	6

^Note 1 For WBA Super Welterweight Title
^Note 2 For Vacant WBC Silver Featherweight Interim Title

== Broadcasting ==
Country	Broadcaster
Australia	Main Event
Denmark	TV 2 Sport
United Kingdom	BoxNation
United States	Showtime

Preceded by vs. Delvin Rodríguez	Austin Trout's bouts 1 December 2012	Succeeded by vs. Canelo Álvarez
Preceded by vs. Floyd Mayweather Jr.	Miguel Cotto's bouts 1 December 2012	Succeeded by vs. Delvin Rodríguez
