= Canelo Álvarez vs. Kermit Cintrón =

Boxing match

- Date: November 26, 2011
- Venue: Plaza de Toros México, Mexico City, Mexico
- Title(s) on the line: WBC super welterweight title

Tale of the tape
Boxer	(Mexico) Saúl Álvarez	(Puerto Rico) Kermit Cintrón
Nickname	"Canelo"	"El Asesino"
Hometown	Tlajomulco de Zúñiga, Jalisco, Mexico	Carolina, Puerto Rico
Pre-fight record	38–0–1 (28 KO)	33–4–1 (28 KO)
Age	21 years, 4 months	32 years, 1 month
Height	5 ft 8 in (173 cm)	5 ft 11 in (180 cm)
Weight	154 lb (70 kg)	154 lb (70 kg)
Style	Orthodox	Orthodox
Recognition	WBC; Super Welterweight Champion; The Ring; No. 2 Ranked Light Middleweight	WBC; No. 14 Ranked Super Welterweight; Former IBF welterweight champion

Result
- Álvarez wins via 5th-round TKO

Canelo Álvarez vs. Kermit Cintrón was a professional boxing match contested on November 26, 2011, for the WBC super welterweight championship. The fight took place at the Plaza de Toros in Mexico City. It was a split-site doubleheader headlined which featured junior lightweight Adrien Broner against separate opponents from Broner's hometown in Cincinnati.

== Background ==
=== Álvarez ===
Alvarez made his third defense. He was coming off of the sixth-round knockout of Alfonso Gómez on Sept. 17 in Los Angeles.

=== Cintrón ===
A former welterweight champion, Cintrón has battled to a disputed draw with The Ring middleweight champion Sergio Martínez, been stopped twice by ex-beltholder Antonio Margarito and lost a four-round technical decision to former two-time beltholder Paul Williams. The hard-hitting Cintrón was coming off of a 10-round unanimous decision over Antwone Smith in August that helped him to rebound from a 10-round unanimous decision loss to Carlos Molina in July.

== The fight ==
Alvarez defeated Cintron via technical knockout in the fifth round of the match.

== Aftermath ==
The fight averaged 1.5 million viewers on HBO: Boxing After Dark.

== Undercard ==
Confirmed bouts:

=== Televised ===
- Super Welterweight Championship bout: (Mexico) Canelo Álvarez (c) vs. (Puerto Rico) Kermit Cintrón
  - Álvarez defeats Cintrón via technical knockout at 2:53 of the fifth round.

=== Preliminary card ===
- Featherweight bout: (Mexico) Salvador Sánchez II vs. (Colombia) Alexander Monterrosa
  - Sánchez defeats Monterrosa via split decision.
- Lightweight bout: (Mexico) Daniel Estrada vs. (Mexico) Carlos Parra
- Middleweight bout: (Mexico) Gilberto Ramirez Sanchez vs. (Colombia) Samuel Miller
  - Sanchez defeats Miller via technical knockout of the fourth round.
- Middleweight bout: (Japan) Nobuhiro Ishida vs. (Mexico) Edson Espinoza
  - Ishida defeats Espinoza via technical knockout of the first round.
- Bantamweight bout: (Mexico) Andrés Gutiérrez vs. (Venezuela) Franklin Varela
- Bantamweight bout: (Mexico) Willy Velazquez vs. (Mexico) Jesus Ceja
  - Velazquez defeats Ceja via unanimous decision.
- Light Flyweight bout: (Mexico) Saul Juarez vs. (Mexico) Oswaldo Novoa
- Super Flyweight bout: (Mexico) Léo Santa Cruz vs. (Mexico) Jorge Romero
  - Cruz defeats Romero via technical knockout at 1:10 of the third round.
- Bantamweight bout: (Mexico) Ramiro Robles vs. (Mexico) Efren Bautista

== International broadcasting ==
Country	Broadcaster
Hungary	Sport 1
Mexico	Televisa
United States	HBO

== See also ==
- Mexico–Puerto Rico boxing rivalry

Preceded by vs. Alfonso Gomez	Canelo Álvarez's bouts 26 November 2011	Succeeded by vs. Shane Mosley
Preceded by vs. Antwone Smith	Kermit Cintrón's bouts 26 November 2011	Succeeded by vs. Adrián Granados
