= Austin Trout =

American boxer (born 1985)

Personal information
- Nickname: No Doubt
- Born: Austin Dwayne Trout; September 18, 1985 (age 41) Las Cruces, New Mexico, U.S.
- Height: 5 ft 9 1/2 in (177 cm)
- Weight: Light middleweight; Middleweight

Boxing career
- Reach: 73 in (185 cm)
- Stance: Southpaw

Boxing record
- Total fights: 43
- Wins: 37
- Win by KO: 18
- Losses: 5
- Draws: 1

Austin Dwayne Trout (born September 18, 1985) is an American professional boxer and bare-knuckle boxer. In boxing he held the World Boxing Association (WBA) light middleweight title (Regular version) from 2011 to 2013. He extended his championship legacy by winning the Bare Knuckle Fighting Championship (BKFC) welterweight title in 2024. As of August 29, 2026, he is #5 in the BKFC men's pound-for-pound rankings, #4 in the welterweight rankings and #1 in the lightweight rankings.

== Early life ==
Trout graduated from Mayfield High School in Las Cruces, New Mexico.

== Amateur career ==
In 2004, Austin was the U.S. National Amateur Welterweight Champion.

Austin was the runner-up to make the 2004 U.S. Olympic Boxing Team. He would finish his amateur career with a final record of 163–42–1.

== Professional career ==
=== Early career ===
On September 1, 2005, Trout made his professional boxing debut at the age of 19 at the Isleta Casino & Resort in Albuquerque, New Mexico. He defeated 34 year old journeyman Justo Almazan (14–44–5, 1 KO) via TKO in round 3. The fight was scheduled for 4 rounds. His second fight was against Josh Pankey, who was making his debut, in December. Trout made easy work of Pankey stopping him after 1 minute and 45 seconds of round 1.

Trout fought a further five times in 2006, winning all bouts inside the distance. In January 2007, Trout knocked out 30 year old Raul Munoz (19–9–1, 15 KOs) in the fifth round of their scheduled six round fight. Three months later, Trout was taken the six round distance when he defeated Mexican boxer Julio Perez with scores of (60–54, 60–54 and 59–55). Less than a month later, Trout was taken the six round distance again, this time against 33 year old journeyman Abdias Castillo. He won the fight comfortably on all three scorecards (60–54, 60–54 and 60–54). Trout fought and won 3 more times in 2007. By the end of the year, his record read 13 wins, 10 inside the distance and no losses.

In November 2009, he beat Taronze Washington to win the vacant WBC Continental Americas light middleweight title.

By climbing up the ranks, he became a mandatory challenger for the WBA light middleweight title. While waiting for his opportunity to fight for Miguel Cotto for the championship title, Austin ended up working with DeAngelo Singleton to help with early stages of PR. Eventually, Trout would fight for and win a world title.

=== WBA (Regular) light middleweight champion ===
Trout fought the WBA (Regular) light middleweight title against Interim champion Rigoberto Álvarez, brother of Canelo Álvarez. The fight was scheduled to take place on February 5, 2011, at the Arena Coliseo in Guadalajara, Jalisco, Mexico. Álvarez was on a three-fight win streak coming into the bout. Trout proved to be the superior boxer of the two winning a lop-sided unanimous decision (119–108, 119–108, 119–108). Trout lost one round on each of the three cards.

==== Early defences ====
In April 2011, soon after winning the WBA (Regular) title, Trout's first defence was announced to take place against mandatory challenger David Alonso López (42–12, 23 KOs) on June 11 in Mexico. Trout dropped López in round 11 as he went on to successfully retain his WBA "regular" title in a 12-round unanimous decision win with the judges scores of 119–109, 117–110 and 118–109 in his favour. Although López had some success, the majority of the rounds were controlled by Trout using his speed, movement and fast hands. A few days after the fight, it was reported that Trout tested positive for marijuana in the post-fight drug test. López's promoter Hector Garcia called for an immediate rematch. On June 29, the test was overturned and Trout was cleared.

Over the next months, Trout's team tried to make a deal to fight Australian contender Anthony Mundine, however the fight failed to take place. By October, a deal was set for Trout to defend his title against another Australian boxer, former welterweight champion Frank LoPorto (15–4, 7 KOs), who was ranked #14 by the WBA on November 11 at the Cohen Stadium in El Paso, Texas. The fight was carried by Showtime. Trout stopped LoPorto in round 6. In what some believed would be a mismatch, LoPorto was also dropped once in round 1 following a right hook. It was the last time LoPorto fought as a professional at the age of 33.

==== Trout vs. Rodriguez ====
On March 19, 2012, the WBA ordered purse bids for Trout vs. Mundine, who was their Interim champion, to take place at their headquarters on March 29. The purse bids never took place and in April, Trout announced he was close to finalizing a deal with former WBO champion Sergiy Dzinziruk (37–1, 23KOs) on August 25, his biggest fight to date. Days later, it was reported that Trout could instead fight Ring Top 10 Delvin Rodriguez (26–5–3, 14 KOs) on the June 2 at the Home Depot Center in Carson, California. Rodriguez was coming off a 10-round decision win against Pawel Wolak. During this time, Trout signed a deal with boxing advisor Al Haymon. The fight aired on Showtime. Trout dominated the fight, going on to win a one sided unanimous decision. The three judges scored the fight 120–108, 118–110, and 117–111 in favour of Trout. Trout was always in control of the fight and more active than Rodriguez, who only let his hands go in the final round. Over the 12 rounds, Trout landed 151 of 699 punches thrown (22%), this included 41% of his power punches landed and Rodriguez landed 89 of his 440 thrown (20%).

==== Trout vs. Cotto ====
On August 31, 2012, terms were agreed for Trout to defend his WBA (Regular) title against former three division champion and No. 2 ranked light middleweight Miguel Cotto (37–3, 30 KOs) on December 1 at Madison Square Garden in New York City. Cotto was coming off a loss in May 2012 against Floyd Mayweather. 13,096 attended the Garden. Trout started the fight off fast, using his quick combinations to continually get his punches off first against Cotto. Trout also used his superior footwork to evade most of Cotto's punches, and was able to out muscle Cotto off the ropes when he was cornered in the fight. During the middle rounds, Cotto found success trapping Trout on the ropes and keeping him there, ripping Trout with body shots and finding the range with his left hook. Trout regained control in the later rounds, even backing Cotto up later in the fight, and stunned Cotto several times down the stretch with his straight left hand. Trout won the fight by a wide unanimous decision, giving him the biggest win of his career thus far. The judges scores were 117–111, 117–111, 119–109. It was the first time Cotto had lost at the arena, having a record of 7–0 before the fight, also being 9–0 in New York. Trout landed 238 of 779 punches (31%) and Cotto landed 183 of 628 punches thrown (29%). After the fight, Trout called out fellow light middleweight champion Canelo Álvarez. The fight averaged 1.047 million and peaked at 1.4 million viewers, which set a record for Showtime boxing.

=== Consecutive losses ===
==== Trout vs. Álvarez ====
On April 20, 2013, Trout fought undefeated Canelo Álvarez at the Alamodome in San Antonio. The fight was supposed to take place during Cinco de Mayo weekend as the co-main event of the Floyd Mayweather Jr. bout against Robert Guerrero; however, due to a contract disagreement between Álvarez and Mayweather regarding their potential fight on September 14, 2013, Álvarez opted to headline his own card. Álvarez held a rematch clause in the contract if wanted however Trout did not. Due to the fight taking place in Texas, a moment of silence was held prior to the fight for the victims of the Boston Marathon bombings on April 15 and the victims of the fertilizer plant explosion on April 17 in West, Texas.

In front of 39,247 fans, Álvarez successfully defended his WBC light middleweight title and won the WBA (Regular) & the vacant The Ring magazine light middleweight title. During the first rounds, Trout seemed to have a good game plan. However, Álvarez's power took over after the third round, eventually scoring a knockdown in the seventh round to give Trout the first knockdown of his career. Álvarez set up the knockdown with a pawing left jab, followed by the straight right hand. The fight was closer than expected, but Álvarez still managed to dominate Trout throughout the fight with impressive head movement and shocking power. All three judges scorecards were in favor of Álvarez with a fair margin (115–112, 116–111 and 118–109). (Note: Recap: Canelo Alvarez vs. Austin Trout – SHOWTIME Boxing – Omar Figueroa vs. Abner Cotto (YouTube). Shosports. August 25, 2013.) Although the last score card (118–109) created controversy, the majority of sport analysts had Álvarez winning by at least 2 points. After 8 rounds, the judges scorecards read (80–71, 78–73 and 76–75) to Álvarez. CompuBox Stats showed that Trout was the busier fighter landing 154 of 769 punches thrown (20%) and Álvarez was the more accurate puncher landing 124 of his 431 thrown (29%). Immediately after the bout, Trout stated that he hadn't underestimated Álvarez but that he trained to fight a completely different fighter.

==== Trout vs. Lara ====
After losing to Álvarez, Trout next fought Cuban boxer Erislandy Lara (18–1–2, 12 KOs) for his WBA Interim light middleweight title. The fight was scheduled to take place on December 7, 2013, at Barclays Center in Brooklyn, New York. It was initially supposed take place on the Floyd Mayweather Jr. vs. Saul Alvarez card on September 14, 2013. Lara, however, put on a dominant performance as he immediately nullified Trout's offense using deft footwork and clean punching. In outclassing Trout, Lara scored a knockdown in round eleven via straight left hand. Trout was hurt for the remainder of the round as Lara pressed the action. Lara cruised to the unanimous decision (117–111, 117–111, and 118–109) and retained his interim WBA light middleweight title. Trout lost his second consecutive bout by decision.

=== Comeback trail ===
Following back to back defeats, Trout took time off before returning to the ring starting his comeback trail to regain a world title at light middleweight. His first comeback fight took place in August 2014 against former WBO light middleweight title challenger Daniel Dawson (40–3–1, 26 KOs) in a 10-round bout. Trout was knocked down twice in round 3 via straight right hands, but rallied on and won a unanimous decision in what was supposed to be an easy tune-up. After 10 rounds, the three judges scored it 97–90 for Trout. Trout next fought four months later in December against fringe contender Luis Grajeda (18–3–2, 14 KOs). Grajeda was knocked down once in round five and failed to come out for round 8, giving Trout a stoppage victory.

On May 9, 2015, Trout fought 33 year old Luis Galarza (20–3, 14 KOs) at the State Farm Arena in Hidalgo, Texas. Galarza was a late replacement for former titlist Anthony Mundine, who had picked up an injury before the fight. Galarza took the fight on 3 days notice and was on a three-fight win streak. Trout controlled the fight from the opening bell eventually forced the stoppage after round 6. In September 2015, Trout knocked out Joey Hernandez (24–3–1, 14 KOs) following a body shot in round 6. Hernandez was deducted a point in round 4 after he threw Trout to the canvas.

=== Title challenges ===
==== Trout vs. Jermall Charlo ====
On March 29, it was announced that Trout would challenge Jermall Charlo (23–0, 18 KOs) for the IBF title at The Cosmopolitan of Las Vegas in Las Vegas, Nevada. The card also included top light middleweights Erislandy Lara, Vanes Martirosyan and Jermell Charlo. At first, there were rumours that the fight would take place on the undercard of Wilder–Povetkin in a Showtime split site telecast. Another possibility was it could take place on the Ortíz–Berto II undercard. In a close contested bout, Charlo defeated Trout by a 12-round unanimous decision. The judges scored the fight 115–113, 116–112, 116–112. Charlo landed the harder shots to dominate the action in the first six rounds. However, Charlo seemed to gas out a little in the second half of the fight, and was outworked by Trout. Trout suffered a cut over his right eye in the 10th round from a clash of heads but fought well despite suffering the cut. The crowd booed loudly when the scores were read out to let the judges know that they felt Trout should have won. Charlo landed 130 of 474 punches thrown (27%) and Trout landed 117 of his 490 thrown (24%). Trout received a purse of $300,000 and Charlo earned a purse of $500,000.

==== Trout vs. Hurd ====
On May 31, 2017 The Ring TV announced a deal was in place for Trout to challenge undefeated American boxer Jarrett Hurd (20–0, 14 KOs) for his newly won IBF light middleweight title on July 29 on the undercard of Mikey Garcia vs. Adrien Broner in New York. Hurd won the then vacant title after stopping Tony Harrison in round 9 in February 2017. The title was left vacant by Jermall Charlo, who moved up to middleweight. On July 20, Boxing Scene reported the fight was being lined up to take place on September 30, 2017, as part of a light middleweight double header alongside Jermell Charlo's WBC title defence against Erickson Lubin. Because Hurd was granted an exception from the IBF to make a voluntary defence, however the winner must fight mandatory challenger Cedric Vitu (46–2, 19 KOs) by December 29, 2017. On August 24, Ringtv announced the fight would take place as part of a light middleweight triple-header at the Barclays Center in New York City on October 14, 2017. The third world title fight on the card would feature Erislandy Lara defending his WBA title against Terrell Gausha.

On fight night, Trout started the fight well, winning the early rounds by jabbing and moving. However, during the third round, Hurd seemed to hurt Trout with some power shots. In the middle rounds, Hurd was able to stifle Trout's movement, making the fight more of a brawl, with both fighters trading power shots. Hurd seemed unfazed by Trout's punches, even though he seemed to tire during round 7. On the other hand, Trout was visibly backed up several times by Hurd's shots. Hurd was cut from a head clash during round 7, while Trout's right eye started swelling. Hurd backed up Trout once again towards the end of round 10. Trout's cornermen retired following round 10 to protect their fighter, to the chagrin of the former world champion. The announced attendance was 7,643. For the fight, Hurd earned $330,000, while Trout, who was stopped inside the distance for the first time since turning professional, was paid $225,000. In the action packed fight, Hurd landed 265 of 753 punches (35%) and Trout landed 208 of his 673 thrown (31%).

On January 11, 2018, it was announced that Trout would make a ring return against Colombian boxer Juan De Angel on the Devon Alexander vs. Victor Ortiz undercard on February 17 at the Don Haskins Center on the UTEP campus in El Paso, Texas. Trout won the bout via unanimous decision. All three judges scored the fight a shut-out 80–72 for Trout.

==== Trout vs. Jermell Charlo ====
At a Showtime press conference on January 24, 2018, it was announced that Jermell Charlo (30–0, 15 KOs) would make a third defence of his WBC title on June 9 on the undercard of Santa Cruz vs. Mares II at the Staples Center in Los Angeles. On April 10, it was announced that Trout would challenge Charlo in a fight which would mark Trout's third world title attempt in his last four fights. Charlo retained his title defeating Trout in a close bout. One judge scored the bout 113–113, however the remaining two judges scored the bout 115–111 and 118–108 for Charlo, giving him the majority decision win. Charlo knocked Trout down in rounds 3 and 9. The bout, which was mostly a tactical affair, was not well received by the fans in attendance. They booed during the bout and again during the post fight interview of Charlo. The first knockdown came with a combination of punches finished with a left hook to the head. After the knockdown, Trout began to fight more defensively. A counter left hook dropped Trout a second time. After the fight, Trout said, "Take away the knockdowns, and I won the fight." Charlo stated his frustrations, "I knew he would come in and try to survive. I could catch him with my hook." According to CompuBox, Charlo landed 106 of 421 punches (25%) and Trout landed 82 of 407 his punches (20%). For his defence, Charlo was paid $750,000 and Trout received a $250,000 paycheck. The fight averaged 532,000 and peaked at 575,000 viewers.

=== Later career ===
==== Trout vs. Gausha ====
On April 11, 2019, it was reported that Trout would fight 31-year-old former world title challenger Terrell Gausha (21–1, 10 KOs) in a 10-round light middleweight bout, headlining at the Beau Rivage Resort Casino in Biloxi, Mississippi, on May 25, on Fox Sports 1. Going into the bout, Trout felt a win would potentially earn him another opportunity at a world title. Gausha was coming off a first-round knockout of former Trout opponent Joey Hernandez in December 2018.

In his next fight, Trout fought Rosbel Montoya. Trout made quick work out of his opponent, stopping him in the second round of the fight.

On 6 February 2021, more than a year after his last fight, Trout fought Juan Armando Garcia in Mexico. Trout dominated his opponent throughout the fight, as all three judges scored the fight 99–91 in his favour, awarding him the unanimous decision victory.

== Bare knuckle boxing ==
On February 2, 2024 at BKFC 57 in Hollywood, Florida, Trout defeated Luis Palomino to become the new BKFC welterweight champion.

Trout made his first title defense against Ricardo Franco on October 12, 2024 at BKFC on DAZN 1. He won the fight by unanimous decision.

Trout made his second title defense against undefeated contender Carlos Trinidad-Snake in the main event on April 4, 2025 at BKFC 71 Dubai: Day 1. After the first five rounds went to a draw, Trout won the fight by split decision. For unknown reasons, the belt was vacated.

In a lightweight bout, Trout faced Luis Palomino in a rematch on December 5, 2025 at BKFC 85. He won the fight by technical knockout at the end of the round, solidifying a title fight against Franco Tenaglia in 2026.

Trout faced interim champion Ben Bonner for the vacant BKFC Lightweight Championship on July 3, 2026, at BKFC Liberty Brawl held at the Wells Fargo Center in Philadelphia. He was knocked out in the second round.

== Outside of boxing ==
Trout appeared on "His Opinion...", an episode of reality TV show Say Yes to the Dress, when his fiancé Taylor chose her wedding dress.

== Championships and accomplishments ==
=== Bare-knuckle boxing ===
- Bare Knuckle Fighting Championship
  - BKFC Welterweight Championship (One time)
    - Two successful title defenses

=== Boxing ===
- WBA Regular light middleweight title, (4 Defenses)
- Texas State light middleweight title
- WBC Continental Americas light middleweight title
- WBA Fedelatin light middleweight title
- WBA International light middleweight title
- U.S. National Amateur Welterweight Champion

== Filmography ==
Television
Year	Title	Episode	Role
2012	Say Yes to the Dress	"His Opinion..."	Himself

== Professional boxing record ==
43 fights	37 wins	5 losses
By knockout	18	1
By decision	19	4
Draws	1	

No.	Result	Record	Opponent	Type	Round, time	Date	Location	Notes
43	Win	37–5–1	Omir Rodriguez	UD	8	Oct 14, 2023	Rudolf Weber-Arena, Oberhausen, Germany	
42	Win	36–5–1	Jose Sanchez Charles	UD	8	Dec 9, 2022	Payne Arena, Hidalgo, Texas, U.S.	Won vacant Texas State light middleweight title
41	Win	35–5–1	Florin Cardos	MD	8	Jul 15, 2022	Historische Stadthalle, Wuppertal, Germany	
40	Win	34–5–1	Alejandro Davila	UD	10	Aug 13, 2021	Hotel Atlantis The Palm, Dubai, UAE	
39	Win	33–5–1	Juan Armando Garcia	UD	10	Feb 6, 2021	Polideportivo Sur, Chihuahua, Mexico	
38	Win	32–5–1	Rosbel Montoya	TKO	2 (10), 1:09	Feb 1, 2020	Inn of the Mountain Gods Resort and Casino, Ruidoso, New Mexico, U.S.	
37	Draw	31–5–1	Terrell Gausha	SD	10	May 25, 2019	Beau Rivage Resort Casino, Biloxi, Mississippi, U.S.	
36	Loss	31–5	Jermell Charlo	MD	12	Jun 9, 2018	Staples Center, Los Angeles, California, U.S.	For WBC light middleweight title
35	Win	31–4	Juan De Angel	UD	8	Feb 17, 2018	Don Haskins Center, El Paso, Texas, U.S.	
34	Loss	30–4	Jarrett Hurd	RTD	10 (12), 3:00	Oct 14, 2017	Barclays Center, New York City, New York, U.S.	For IBF light middleweight title
33	Loss	30–3	Jermall Charlo	UD	12	May 21, 2016	Cosmopolitan of Las Vegas, Paradise, Nevada, U.S.	For IBF light middleweight title
32	Win	30–2	Joey Hernandez	KO	6 (10), 3:00	Sep 8, 2015	Hollywood Palladium, Los Angeles, California, U.S.	
31	Win	29–2	Luis Galarza	TKO	6 (10), 3:00	May 9, 2015	State Farm Arena, Hidalgo, Texas, U.S.	
30	Win	28–2	Luis Grajeda	RTD	7 (10), 3:00	Dec 11, 2014	Pechanga Resort & Casino, Temecula, California, U.S.	
29	Win	27–2	Daniel Dawson	UD	10	Aug 22, 2014	Pechanga Resort & Casino, Temecula, California, U.S.	
28	Loss	26–2	Erislandy Lara	UD	12	Dec 7, 2013	Barclays Center, New York City, New York, U.S.	For WBA interim light middleweight title
27	Loss	26–1	Canelo Álvarez	UD	12	Apr 20, 2013	Alamodome, San Antonio, Texas, U.S.	Lost WBA (Regular) light middleweight title; For WBC and vacant The Ring light middleweight titles
26	Win	26–0	Miguel Cotto	UD	12	Dec 1, 2012	Madison Square Garden, New York City, New York, U.S.	Retained WBA (Regular) light middleweight title
25	Win	25–0	Delvin Rodríguez	UD	12	Jun 2, 2012	Home Depot Center, Carson, California, U.S.	Retained WBA (Regular) light middleweight title
24	Win	24–0	Frank LoPorto	TKO	6 (12), 2:32	Nov 11, 2011	Cohen Stadium, El Paso, Texas, U.S.	Retained WBA (Regular) light middleweight title
23	Win	23–0	David Alonso López	UD	12	Jun 11, 2011	Auditorio Miguel Barragán, San Luis Potosí City, Mexico	Retained WBA (Regular) light middleweight title
22	Win	22–0	Rigoberto Álvarez	UD	12	Feb 5, 2011	Arena Coliseo, Guadalajara, Mexico	Won vacant WBA (Regular) light middleweight title
21	Win	21–0	Taronze Washington	UD	12	Nov 5, 2009	Petroleum Club, Dallas, Texas, U.S.	Won vacant WBC Continental Americas light middleweight title
20	Win	20–0	Nilson Julio Tapia	MD	11	Sep 5, 2009	Roberto Durán Arena, Panama City, Panama	Won WBA Fedelatin light middleweight title
19	Win	19–0	Marcos Primera	UD	8	Jul 31, 2009	Pan American Center, Las Cruces, New Mexico, U.S.	
18	Win	18–0	Shawn Garnett	UD	8	Jun 26, 2009	Casino Rama, Rama, Ontario, Canada	
17	Win	17–0	Martin Avila	TKO	4 (12)	Mar 14, 2009	Coliseo Centenario, Torreón, Mexico	Won vacant WBA International light middleweight title
16	Win	16–0	Bradley Thompson	RTD	3 (4), 0:10	Nov 20, 2008	Grand Plaza Hotel, Houston, Texas, U.S.	
15	Win	15–0	Byron Tyson	UD	8	Jul 9, 2008	Grand Plaza Hotel, Houston, Texas, U.S.	
14	Win	14–0	Steve Verdin	TKO	2 (6), 2:26	May 2, 2008	County Coliseum, El Paso, Texas, U.S.	
13	Win	13–0	Erik Rafael Esquivel	UD	6	Dec 21, 2007	Dickerson's Event Center, Las Cruces, New Mexico, U.S.	
12	Win	12–0	Roderick McGary	TKO	1 (6), 1:17	Nov 17, 2007	Kruse Auction Park, Auburn, Indiana, U.S.	
11	Win	11–0	Nelson Estupinan	TKO	2 (6), 0:46	Jul 27, 2007	Isleta Resort & Casino, Albuquerque, New Mexico, U.S.	
10	Win	10–0	Abdias Castillo	UD	6	May 25, 2007	Isleta Resort & Casino, Albuquerque, New Mexico, U.S.	
9	Win	9–0	Julio Perez	UD	6	Apr 27, 2007	Grand Plaza Hotel, Houston, Texas, U.S.	
8	Win	8–0	Raul Munoz	KO	5 (6), 2:21	Jan 5, 2007	Dickerson's Event Center, Las Cruces, New Mexico, U.S.	
7	Win	7–0	Cardyl Finley	KO	2 (6), 1:30	Dec 15, 2006	Grand Plaza Hotel, Houston, Texas, U.S.	
6	Win	6–0	Dustin Lilly	TKO	1 (4)	Sep 29, 2006	Burnin' Downtown Festival, Topeka, Kansas, U.S.	
5	Win	5–0	Jerry Perez	KO	3 (6), 0:56	Sep 1, 2006	Route 66 Casino Hotel, Albuquerque, New Mexico, U.S.	
4	Win	4–0	Jeremy Berger	TKO	1 (4), 2:59	Mar 4, 2006	Landon Arena, Topeka, Kansas, U.S.	
3	Win	3–0	Anthony Torres	TKO	3 (4), 1:04	Feb 4, 2006	Don Haskins Center, El Paso, Texas, U.S.	
2	Win	2–0	Josh Pankey	TKO	1 (4), 1:45	Dec 10, 2005	American Legion Hall, Blairstown, Iowa, U.S.	
1	Win	1–0	Justo Almazan	TKO	3 (4), 1:43	Sep 16, 2005	Isleta Resort & Casino, Albuquerque, New Mexico, U.S.	

== Bare-knuckle boxing record ==
Professional record breakdown
6 matches	5 wins	1 loss
By knockout	2	1
By decision	3	0

Res.	Record	Opponent	Method	Event	Date	Round	Time	Location	Notes
Loss	5–1	Ben Bonner	KO	BKFC Liberty Brawl	July 3, 2026	2	0:30	Philadelphia, Pennsylvania, United States	For vacant BKFC Lightweight Championship
Win	5–0	Luis Palomino	TKO (doctor stoppage)	BKFC 85	December 5, 2025	3	2:00	Hollywood, Florida, United States	Lightweight debut.
Win	4–0	Carlos Trinidad-Snake	Decision (split)	BKFC 71 Dubai: Day 1	April 4, 2025	6	2:00	Dubai, United Arab Emirates	Defended the BKFC Welterweight Championship. The first five rounds went to a draw
Win	3–0	Ricardo Franco	Decision (unanimous)	BKFC on DAZN: Tenaglia vs. Soto	October 12, 2024	5	2:00	Marbella, Spain	Defended the BKFC Welterweight Championship.
Win	2–0	Luis Palomino	Decision (unanimous)	BKFC 57	February 2, 2024	5	2:00	Hollywood, Florida, United States	Won the vacant BKFC Welterweight Championship.
Win	1–0	Diego Sanchez	TKO (doctor stoppage)	BKFC KnuckleMania 3	February 17, 2023	4	1:44	Albuquerque, New Mexico, United States	

Sporting positions
Amateur boxing titles
Previous: Juan McPherson	U.S. welterweight champion 2004	Next: Demetrius Andrade
Regional boxing titles
Vacant Title last held by Anthony Small	WBA International super welterweight champion March 14, 2009 – September 5, 2009; Won Fedelatin title	Vacant Title next held by Vanes Martirosyan
Preceded by Nilson Julio Tapia	WBA Fedelatin super welterweight champion September 5, 2009 – November 2009; Vacated	Vacant Title next held by Erislandy Lara
Preceded by Carson Jones	WBC Continental Americas super welterweight champion November 5, 2009 – July 2010; Vacated	Vacant Title next held by Alfredo Angulo
World boxing titles
Vacant Title last held by Miguel Cotto	WBA super welterweight champion Regular title February 5, 2011 – April 20, 2013; Lost bid for Super title	Vacant Title next held by Erislandy Lara
