= Anthony Martinez =

Anthony Martinez may refer to:

- Anthony Martinez (politician) (born 1963), Belizean politician
- Anthony Martinez (drummer)
- Anthony Martinez, victim of serial killer Joseph Edward Duncan
- Anthony Martinez (boxer)
