= Nobuhiro Ishida =

Japanese boxer

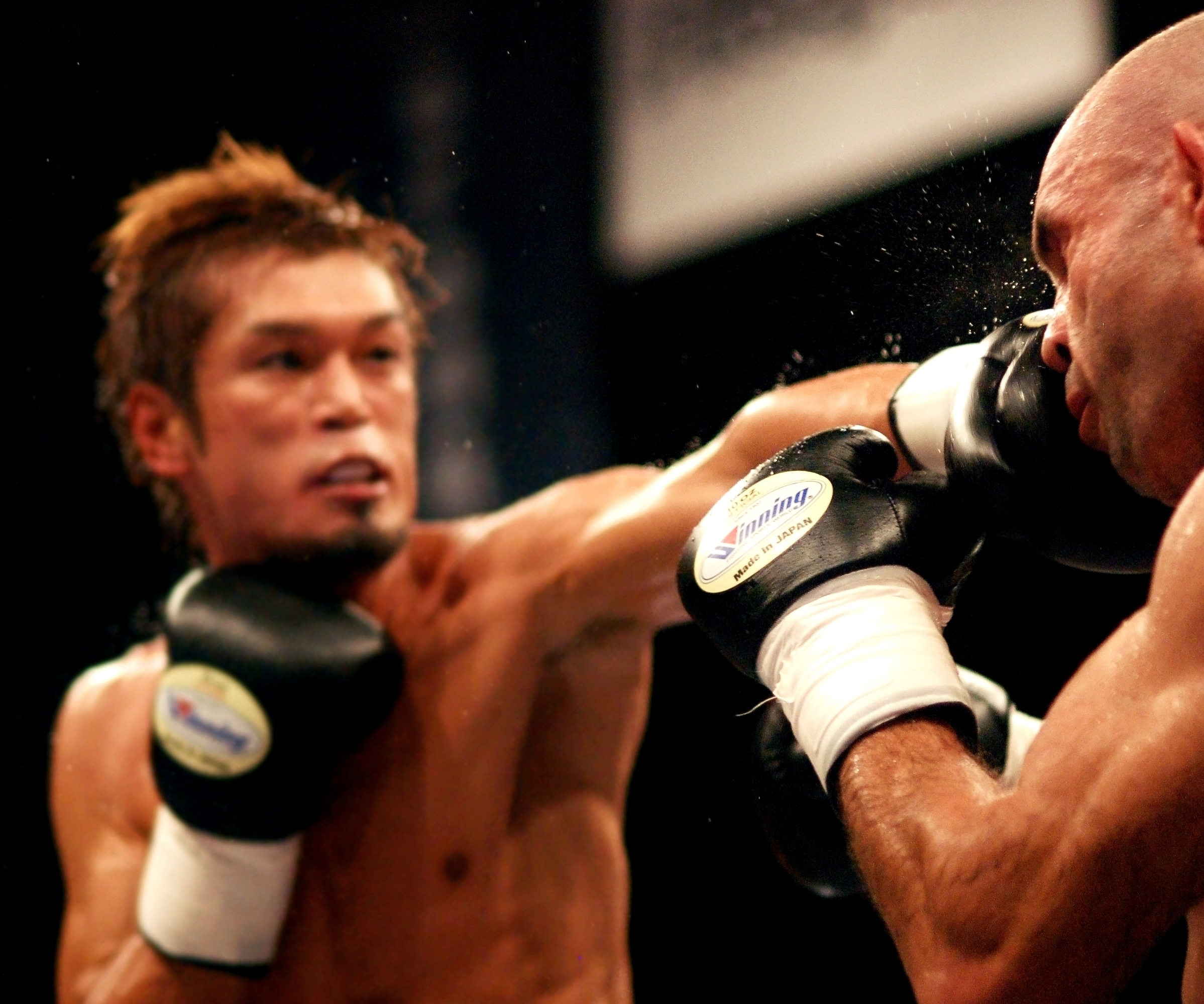
- Ishida fighting against Álvarez in 2010

Personal information
- Nationality: Japanese
- Born: 18 August 1975 (age 50) Nagasu, Japan
- Height: 6 ft 1 1/2 in (187 cm)
- Weight: Light middleweight Middleweight; Heavyweight

Boxing career
- Reach: 72 in (183 cm)
- Stance: Orthodox

Boxing record
- Total fights: 40
- Wins: 27
- Win by KO: 11
- Losses: 11
- Draws: 2

Nobuhiro Ishida (石田 順裕, Ishida Nobuhiro; born August 18, 1975) is a Japanese former professional boxer. He is a former WBA interim super welterweight champion who is best known for knocking out James Kirkland in a middleweight bout at the MGM Grand Las Vegas in April 2011. Ishida has so far been promoted by Canelo Promotions and Golden Boy Promotions among others and has been co-trained by Rudy Hernández and Daisuke Okabe, while residing back and forth between Los Angeles, California, United States and Osaka, Japan.

== Early life and amateur career ==
Ishida was born in Tamana District, Kumamoto and moved to Neyagawa, Osaka soon after. He began boxing at the Osaka Teiken Boxing Gym at the sixth grade of elementary school (at age eleven). When Ishida was a high school freshman, he fought as an in-fighter in the flyweight division at 176 centimeters (5 feet 10 inches) tall. He won the national high school invitational tournament in the lightweight division in 1993.

After graduating from Kinki University, Ishida won another amateur title in the light middleweight in 1998. He compiled an amateur record of 101–15 (50 KOs). Ishida worked for the child welfare for two years and two months from August 1998. He paused his boxing career to pursue studies, and qualified as a social welfare secretary. Ishida worked at an orphanage. His experience of living with the orphans motivated him to turn professional.

== Professional career ==
=== Super Welterweight ===
Ishida restarted his boxing career in 2000. He made his professional debut on May 20 of that year under the management of Kanazawa Boxing Gym. There he received Toshihiro Fujitani's guidance until the end of 2010. Ishida won the OPBF super welterweight title via a technical decision on March 1, 2001. The bout was stopped in the eleventh round as Ishida's right eye was injured after the accidental headbutt. He managed to get his first title in his sixth match. He lost the unification match against the OPBF interim champion by a twelve-round unanimous decision on May 13, 2001. That was his first loss in his professional career. Ishida lost the Japanese super welterweight title shot in his next fight on September 24 of that year by a ten-round majority decision. In June and October, 2002, Ishida fought for the OPBF and interim Japanese title respectively in the same weight division, but lost two in a row.

At that time, Ishida trained in Los Angeles for the first time to get out of the slump. He watched the boxing matches in Las Vegas and felt that he would like to someday fight there. Loren Goodman noted the words of Ishida in his book published in 2006.

...I went to L.A. at first...but the atmosphere of the gym was really good. L.A. Gym. It was like, "I've come to the Mecca of boxing." It felt really good, and the atmosphere of the gym was good. At first, I went for about a month. America was fun—it was...fun.

— Loren Goodman, Endless Punchers: Body, Narrative, and Performance in the World of Japanese Boxing

Ishida married on Christmas Day, 2003. His wife has worked as a clinical psychologist. They have one daughter and two sons. Ishida captured the vacant Japanese super welterweight title on December 2, 2006, and defended the title twice before vacating it. He has often trained under the guidance of Rudy Hernández at the Maywood Boxing Club in Maywood, California. When Ishida who used to be a in-fighter outpointed the WBA number six and WBC number seven ranked Javier Alberto Mamaní with scores of 100–91, 100–91, 98–94 in October 2007, he had turned into a good defensive out-fighter controlling the fight with his left jabs and forehand blows.

==== Interim WBA World title ====
Ishida won the WBA super welterweight title eliminator over Venezuelan Marco Antonio Avendaño via a split decision at the Osaka Prefectural Gymnasium on September 22, 2008. He had decided to be a bullfighter for that fight. However, the world title shot against the regular champion Daniel Santos did not materialize. Ishida won the interim WBA world super welterweight title over Avendaño via a wide margin unanimous decision in front of spectators including one hundred children and staff whom he invited from the orphanage where he had worked before his professional debut, at the Osaka Prefectural Gymnasium on August 30, 2009. In order to make that matchup, his manager Kanazawa mortgaged building which served as the gym and his home. The purse was not paid to Ishida. Although it was an interim title, no Japanese boxers have regained the world super welterweight title since Tadashi Mihara was dethroned in February 1982. Yet, on that day, the general election where the historical change of government occurred was made in Japan, so Ishida's fight was broadcast only on a pay TV channel, sky-A sports+. Santos lost the title to Yuri Foreman in November 2009. Ishida was eager to fight in a unification match against Foreman, saying that he would go anywhere in the world for it and was confident to win it with his own fighting style and with a way which he most want to show to the audience. But Foreman lost the title in his first defense against Miguel Cotto in June 2010, and Ishida's matchup against Cotto did not happen.

In the first defense of the interim title on December 29, 2009, Ishida defeated Colombian Oney Valdéz by a unanimous decision after knocking him down in the tenth round on the undercard of Kazuto Ioka's non-title light flyweight ten round bout at the Osaka Prefectural Gymnasium. While he had been negotiating to fight against Rigoberto Álvarez, Austin Trout arbitrarily released the fight against Ishida in the United States in late August 2010. So the negotiations for the fight between Ishida and Álvarez were halted. When the WBA upgraded Cotto to the status of a super champion in September of that year, Ishida was not automatically promoted to a regular champion. The WBA instructed Ishida and Trout to compete for the vacant WBA regular title. Ishida and Trout were supposed to bid for the match at the WBA headquarters on September 21, but both sides did not participate in it, so the bid was not met. After more twists and turns, the WBA decided Álvarez as Ishida's opponent for the vacant WBA world title, and announced it on their official website in late September.

Ishida fought against Rigoberto Álvarez for the vacant WBA world super welterweight championship as his first expedition match in Tepic, Nayarit, Mexico on October 9, 2010, and lost there. (Note: Except non-Japanese nationals, Ishida is the Japan's ninth world champion who risked his title across the sea. At that point, the only one among nine successfully defended his world title outside of Asia.) It was after several hours of the fight that Ishida was informed that the result was a narrow split decision with scores of 112–115, 113–114 and 114–113. Ishida does not think that he lost the fight, partially because of the controversial knock down call against Ishida in the seventh round which appeared to have been a slip, but he did not protest the decision. In the WBA official ratings published on October 15, Álvarez was designated as an interim champion, Ishida was ranked number four, and the regular champion remained vacant. The JBC (Japan Boxing Commission) immediately asked the WBA about the title of that fight. Instead of a reply, the WBA posted an article where they released the championship for the vacant regular title between Álvarez and Trout in December on their official website. As the WBA ordered, Ishida vs. Álvarez was held as a regular championship by the promoter. Ishida, Álvarez, Televisa which aired that fight and the media in many countries had recognized that they fought for the world title. Nevertheless, after all, it was positioned as per the WBA official ratings as a defense of the interim title which Ishida had held.

After that defeat, Ishida's team had to change his fighting style yet again, especially because once he decided to fight outside of his own country. Ishida signed a management contract with Japan's Green-Tsuda Boxing Club (Note: However, in practice, that procedure was not completed for several troubles until October 25, 2011.) and a three-fight promotional contract with Mexico's Canelo Promotions under the supervision of Edison Reynoso who handled the previous fight.

=== Middleweight ===
==== Ishida vs. Kirkland ====
Ishida moved up in weight division to knock out the previously undefeated James Kirkland whose record was 27–0 (24 KOs), flooring him three times in one minute and fifty-two seconds of the first round in an eight-round middleweight bout on the HBO pay-per-view televised undercard of Erik Morales vs. Marcos Maidana at the MGM Grand Las Vegas on April 9, 2011, in less than a month after the Tōhoku earthquake. Nori Takatani (who was the manager of Genaro Hernández, Oscar Albarado and others), Rudy Hernández, Daisuke Okabe and Hidenobu Honda from Green-Tsuda (who was the Japanese champion and two-time world title challenger) were in Ishida's corner. The fight was released just about two weeks before the fight. During the short preparation time, Ishida trained in Las Vegas and California, including sparring with big boxers such as Peter Quillin. Prior to the fight, Ishida's team decided to never throw roundhouse punches, and was careful with where on the ring he should be. The announcer Jim Lampley said that it was a bigger upset than Buster Douglas beating Mike Tyson in 1990. It was voted as the Upset of the Year in The Ring's 83rd Annual Ring Awards and SI.com's 2011 Boxing Awards. In addition, in the RingTV.com's year-end polls for 2011, it attracted 22.6 percent of the vote for the Upset of the Year (ranking third), and 9.2 percent of the vote for the KO of the Year (ranking second by a large margin). Ishida was not happy with the status of the former interim champion, and was still not satisfied with knocking out Kirkland on such a big stage.

After that upset, Reynoso announced he has a big plan for Ishida. Sampson Lewkowicz, the adviser of Sergio Martínez, made an offer to Ishida as one of the possible opponents for Martínez. Ishida was once scheduled to fight Paul Williams at a maximum weight of 155 pounds on July 9, 2011, at the Boardwalk Hall in Atlantic City, New Jersey. However it was canceled. Soon as Julio César Chávez, Jr. told that Ishida was his possible opponent, Ishida phoned from Sacramento, California, and welcomed the match. They had been negotiating the fight, but it was not also signed. Despite the efforts of Eric Gomez, the vice president and matchmaker of Golden Boy Promotions, Ishida's opponent was quite undecided.

According to a YouTube video by Canelo Promotions and Ishida's blog as of November 2011, although Ishida is most comfortable in the middleweight division, he is willing to move in weight classes, since he thinks he had better prepare the opportunity in possible multiple classes than pick a weight class, until the right offer comes. Having trained in Los Angeles from July 2011, he served as Saúl Álvarez's sparring partner at his training camp in Mexico from November of that year. Ishida won by a technical knockout in the first round against late substitute opponent Edson Espinoza on the undercard of Canelo Álvarez vs. Kermit Cintrón on November 26, 2011.

=== Return to Super Welterweight ===
==== Ishida vs. Williams ====
Ishida fought against Paul Williams in a twelve-round super welterweight bout held as the main event on Showtime Championship Boxing at the American Bank Center in Corpus Christi, Texas, on February 18, 2012. (Note: "Williams vs. Ishida - Sat Feb 18, 10PM ET-PT". Showtime Sports. 2012. (includes links to video)) For that fight, he sparred with Hugo Centeno, Jr., Ray Rivera and others, in Maywood, Bell, Carson and East Los Angeles, California. Ishida made it an inside fight where power punches accounted for a larger proportion than jabs. Williams' bodywork skills and holding tactics did not allow Ishida to throw accurate punches, compared with the five fights against Kirkland, Álvarez, Valdéz and Avendaño twice. Ishida's single shots and not many combinations, although they were sometimes shorter and sharper than those of his opponent as were his characteristic ways and made Williams' face swollen, were not enough to make up for the lack of power and physical strength which has often been pointed out. He lost the fight via a unanimous decision by the identical scores of 108–120, but managed to put himself in position to earn another decent opportunity. Ishida's rankings dropped slightly to number three and number nine in the WBA super welterweight and WBO middleweight, respectively.

=== Return to Middleweight ===
==== Ishida vs. Pirog ====
Subsequently, Ishida lost to Dmitry Pirog via a unanimous decision in the WBO middleweight title bout at the Sport Complex Krylatskoe in Moscow, Russia on May 1 of that year. As the JBC had been hesitant to allow that fight, Ishida resigned his JBC license on April 27, 2012. Hence, Ishida had not been permitted to fight in Japan from that time forward in principle. He has been licensed in California and Texas. In June 2012, Ishida underwent surgery to remove bone chips in his left elbow that had plagued him for years.

==== Ishida vs. Golovkin ====
On March 15, 2013, just before the JBC joined the WBO and the IBF, they gave Ishida permission to fight under the JBC license. Thus, he is allowed to fight anywhere in the world.

Ishida fought for the WBA and IBO middleweight titles against Gennady Golovkin at the Salle des Étoiles in Monte Carlo, Monaco on March 30, 2013. The bout was co-featured to the "Monte Carlo Million Dollar Super Four", a light heavyweight elimination tournament. He was knocked out for the first time in his career by Golovkin's overhand right in the third round. (Note: Gennady GGG Golovkin vs. Nobuhiro Ishida, Fight Night (a documentary video from YouTube). GGG Promotions. April 1, 2013. Golovkin vs. Ishida 0:55.)

Ishida made a return to the ring in Japan in August 2013.

== Professional boxing record ==
40 fights	27 wins	11 losses
By knockout	11	1
By decision	16	10
Draws	2	

No.	Result	Record	Opponent	Type	Round, time	Date	Location	Notes
40	Loss	27–11–2	Kyotaro Fujimoto	SD	10 (10)	2015-04-30	Korakuen Hall, Tokyo, Japan	
39	Win	27–10–2	Kotatsu Takehara	RTD	4 (8), 3:00	2014-12-27	Sumiyoshi Ward Center, Osaka, Japan	
38	Win	26–10–2	David Radeff	UD	8 (8)	2014-09-14	Osaka Prefectural Gymnasium, Osaka, Japan	
37	Loss	25–10–2	Kyotaro Fujimoto	UD	8 (8)	2014-04-30	Korakuen Hall, Tokyo, Japan	
36	Win	25–9–2	Elly Pangaribuan	KO	2 (10)	2013-08-04	IMP Hall, Osaka, Japan	
35	Loss	24–9–2	Gennady Golovkin	KO	3 (12), 2:11	2013-03-30	Salle des Étoiles, Monte Carlo, Monaco	For WBA and IBO middleweight titles
34	Loss	24–8–2	Dmitry Pirog	UD	12 (12)	2012-05-01	Krylatskoye Sports Palace, Moscow, Russia	For WBO middleweight title
33	Loss	24–7–2	Paul Williams	UD	12 (12)	2012-02-18	American Bank Center, Corpus Christi, Texas, U.S.	For vacant WBC International Silver middleweight title
32	Win	24–6–2	Edson Espinoza	TKO	1 (4), 2:58	2011-11-26	Plaza de Toros México, Mexico City, Distrito Federal, Mexico	
31	Win	23–6–2	James Kirkland	TKO	1 (8), 1:52	2011-04-09	MGM Grand Garden Arena, Las Vegas, Nevada, U.S.	
30	Loss	22–6–2	Rigoberto Álvarez	SD	12 (12)	2010-10-09	Mesón de los Deportes, Tepic, Nayarit, Mexico	Lost interim WBA super welterweight title
29	Win	22–5–2	Oney Valdéz	UD	12 (12)	2009-12-29	Osaka Prefectural Gymnasium, Osaka, Japan	Retained interim WBA super welterweight title
28	Win	21–5–2	Marco Antonio Avendaño	UD	12 (12)	2009-08-30	Osaka Prefectural Gymnasium, Osaka, Japan	Won interim WBA super welterweight title
27	Win	20–5–2	Marco Antonio Avendaño	SD	12 (12)	2008-09-22	Osaka Prefectural Gymnasium, Osaka, Japan	
26	Win	19–5–2	Tatsuki Kawasaki	TKO	6 (10), 1:41	2008-04-02	Korakuen Hall, Tokyo, Japan	Retained Japanese super welterweight title
25	Win	18–5–2	Javier Alberto Mamaní	UD	10 (10)	2007-10-06	Osaka Prefectural Gymnasium, Osaka, Japan	
24	Win	17–5–2	Tatsuki Kawasaki	TKO	6 (10), 1:39	2007-04-05	Korakuen Hall, Tokyo, Japan	Retained Japanese super welterweight title
23	Win	16–5–2	Shinsuke Matsumoto	MD	10 (10)	2006-12-02	Osaka Prefectural Gymnasium, Osaka, Japan	Won vacant Japanese super welterweight title
22	Win	15–5–2	Hyung-Won Jung	KO	4 (10), 2:39	2006-06-11	IMP Hall, Osaka, Japan	
21	Draw	14–5–2	Takuji Matsuhashi	PTS	4 (4)	2005-11-19	Korakuen Hall, Tokyo, Japan	Won Japan's 2nd B:Tight! 154 lb tournament after an extra fifth round.
20	Win	14–5–1	Kōzō Watanabe	UD	4 (4)	2005-08-20	Korakuen Hall, Tokyo, Japan	
19	Win	13–5–1	Teruo Nagase	UD	4 (4)	2005-05-07	Korakuen Hall, Tokyo, Japan	
18	Win	12–5–1	Yūki Nonaka	UD	10 (10)	2004-12-22	Nanba Grand Kagetsu, Osaka, Japan	
17	Loss	11–5–1	Crazy Kim	UD	10 (10)	2004-06-14	Korakuen Hall, Tokyo, Japan	For Japanese super welterweight title
16	Win	11–4–1	Shinsuke Matsumoto	MD	8 (8)	2004-04-23	Osaka Prefectural Gymnasium, Osaka, Japan	
15	Win	10–4–1	Akira Ōhigashi	UD	10 (10)	2003-09-26	Osaka Municipal Central Gymnasium, Osaka, Japan	
14	Win	9–4–1	Toshihiko Itagaki	UD	8 (8)	2003-07-09	Korakuen Hall, Tokyo, Japan	
13	Win	8–4–1	Jō Asano	TKO	2 (8), 1:02	2003-04-14	Korakuen Hall, Tokyo, Japan	
12	Loss	7–4–1	Crazy Kim	UD	10 (10)	2002-10-10	Ryōgoku Kokugikan, Tokyo, Japan	For interim Japanese super welterweight title
11	Loss	7–3–1	Nader Hamdan	UD	12 (12)	2002-06-20	Osaka Prefectural Gymnasium, Osaka, Japan	For OPBF super welterweight title
10	Win	7–2–1	Moechrody	KO	5 (10), 1:04	2001-03-01	Osaka Prefectural Gymnasium, Osaka, Japan	
9	Draw	6–2–1	Kevin Kelly	SD	10 (10)	2001-12-03	Osaka Prefectural Gymnasium, Osaka, Japan	Kelly was knocked down in the first round.
8	Loss	6–2	Jōya Kawai	MD	10 (10)	2001-09-24	Yokohama Arena, Yokohama, Japan	For Japanese super welterweight title
7	Loss	6–1	Seiji Takechi	UD	12 (12)	2001-05-13	Sakaide Saty Hall, Kagawa, Japan	Lost OPBF super welterweight title
6	Win	6–0	Kook-Yul Song	TD	11 (12), 2:11	2001-03-01	Osaka Prefectural Gymnasium, Osaka, Japan	Won OPBF super welterweight title
5	Win	5–0	Boy Nituda	KO	2 (10), 0:59	2000-12-12	Maizu Arena, Osaka, Japan	
4	Win	4–0	Tata Regatuna	KO	2 (10), 2:03	2000-10-02	Osaka Prefectural Gymnasium, Osaka, Japan	
3	Win	3–0	Haris Pujono	UD	8 (8)	2000-08-27	Osaka Prefectural Gymnasium, Osaka, Japan	
2	Win	2–0	Eiji Kanō	UD	6 (6)	2000-07-02	Osaka, Japan	
1	Win	1–0	Hiroaki Obata	UD	6 (6)	2000-05-20	Osaka, Japan	Ishida was knocked down once in the fight.

== Titles and recognitions ==
Amateur titles:

- The 4th National High school Boxing Invitational Championships Lightweight Tournament Winner
- The 50th All Japan Citizen Boxing Championships Light Middleweight Winner

Professional titles:

- The 2nd B:Tight! Super Welterweight Tournament Winner
- The 22nd OPBF Super Welterweight Champion (Defense: 0)
- The 28th Japanese Super Welterweight Champion (Defenses: 2)
- Interim WBA World Super Welterweight Champion (Defense: 1)

Recognitions:

- 2011 The Ring Upset of the Year
- 2011 Sports Illustrated Upset of the Year

== Bibliography ==
- Goodman, Loren (2006). Endless Punchers: Body, Narrative, and Performance in the World of Japanese Boxing. Ann Arbor, Michigan, United States. pp. 132, 478, 479, 487–488, 537. ISBN 9780542777479.
- Boxing Magazine editorial department (with Japan Boxing Commission, Japan Pro Boxing Association), ed. (March 10, 2001). "2000年 出場選手全記録". 日本ボクシング年鑑2001 (Japan Boxing Year Book 2001) (in Japanese). Tokyo, Japan: Baseball Magazine Sha Co., Ltd. p. 71. ISBN 978-4-583-03633-5.
- Boxing Magazine editorial department (with Japan Boxing Commission, Japan Pro Boxing Association), ed. (April 30, 2005). "2004 World, OPBF, Japan 全タイトルマッチ 73 Fights", "2004年 出場選手全記録", "アマチュア・レコード". 日本ボクシング年鑑2005 (Japan Boxing Year Book 2005) (in Japanese). Tokyo, Japan: Baseball Magazine Sha Co., Ltd. pp. 25, 62, 206–207. ISBN 978-4-583-03849-0.
- Boxing Magazine editorial department, ed. (March 1, 2004). "石田順裕". 日本プロボクシングチャンピオン大鑑 (in Japanese). Tokyo, Japan: Baseball Magazine Sha Co., Ltd. p. 132. ISBN 978-4-583-03784-4.
- Tanigawa, Shunki (November 9, 2010). スポーツ千夜一夜 – 彼が賭けて戦ったものは… (in Japanese). Jiji Press. pp. 1–3.
- Donovan, Jake (April 2012). "Upset of the Year". The Ring. No. May 2012 issue. Pennsylvania, United States: Sports and Entertainment Publications, LLC. pp. 44–45.
- Boxing Beat editorial department (February 15, 2012). MACC Publications Inc (ed.). インタビュー 高山勝成. Ironman. Boxing Beat (in Japanese) (special issue). Tokyo, Japan: Fitness Sports Co., Ltd.: 78.

Sporting positions
World boxing titles
Vacant Title last held by Alejandro García	WBA super welterweight champion Interim title August 30, 2009 – October 9, 2010	Succeeded by Rigoberto Álvarez
Awards
Previous: Jason Litzau W10 vs. Celestino Caballero	The Ring magazine Upset of the Year; KO1 vs. James Kirkland; 2011	Next: Sonny Boy Jaro KO6 vs. Pongsaklek Wonjongkam
