= Canelo Álvarez vs. Austin Trout =

Boxing match

Showdown of the Champions
- Date: April 20, 2013
- Venue: Alamodome, San Antonio, Texas, U.S.
- Title(s) on the line: WBA (Unified), WBC and The Ring super welterweight titles

Tale of the tape
Boxer	Saul Álvarez	Austin Trout
Nickname	Canelo ("Cinnamon")	No Doubt
Hometown	Guadalajara, Jalisco, Mexico	Las Cruces, New Mexico, U.S.
Purse	$2,300,000	$950,000
Pre-fight record	41–0–1 (30 KO)	26–0 (14 KO)
Age	22 years, 9 months	27 years, 7 months
Height	5 ft 8 in (173 cm)	5 ft 9 1/2 in (177 cm)
Weight	153 1/2 lb (70 kg)	154 lb (70 kg)
Style	Orthodox	Southpaw
Recognition	WBC; Super Welterweight Champion; The Ring; No. 2 Ranked Light middleweight	WBA (Regular); Super Welterweight Champion; The Ring; No. 3 Ranked Light middleweight

Result
- Álvarez wins via 12–round unanimous decision (118–109, 116–111, 115–112)

Canelo Álvarez vs. Austin Trout, billed as Showdown of the Champions, was a professional boxing match contested on April 20, 2013 for the WBA (Unified), WBC and The Ring super welterweight titles.

== Background ==
In his previous fight on December 1, 2012, reigning WBA (Regular) super welterweight titleholder Austin Trout scored an upset victory over heavy favorite Miguel Cotto, the 4th successful defence of the secondary belt. In attendance was Saúl "Canelo" Álvarez, who was tentatively scheduled to meet Cotto the following May in a unification bout, but the fight was scrapped after Cotto's unexpected loss. Instead, Álvarez and Trout's teams engaged in talks to face each other next and, after nearly three months of negotiations, the Álvarez–Trout fight was announced in late February to take place on April 20th at San Antonio's Alamodome.

Originally, Álvarez and Trout had been scheduled to take place on May 4 as the featured undercard bout on a card headlined by the Floyd Mayweather–Robert Guerrero fight, after which Mayweather and Álvarez, the heavy favorites in their respective fights, would face each other later in the year. However, Álvarez decided to pull out of the May 4th bout and instead headline his own card on April 20 after being unable to reach a contractual agreement with Mayweather.

Trout was ranked as the 2nd best Light middleweight by TBRB with Álvarez ranked 4th.

== Fight Details ==
Álvarez used constant movement, counter-punching and a more defensive approach to take the early rounds, but Trout stayed busy and constantly threw punches and was able to get back in the fight by winning some of the middle rounds on Shellenberger and Danseco's scorecards. However, the turning point came early in the seventh when Álvarez scored the lone knockdown of the bout, dropping Trout to his knees for the first time as a professional with a right hand. Though Trout did rebound to take some of the later rounds on all three scorecards, Álvarez had accumulated and big enough lead on the scorecards that Trout was unable to overcome.

The fight went the full 12-round distance, with Álvarez earn a somewhat close unanimous decision victory, winning one scorecard, that of renowned South African judge Stanley Christodoulou, by the lopsided score of 118–109 (ten rounds to two), but winning the other two scorecards by rather close scores of 116–111 on Texas local Oren Shellenberger's card and 115–112 on Filipino Rey Danseco's card.

The unofficial scorecards from boxing pundits across the broadcast media were nearly split amongst the two fighters with notable media members such as Dan Rafael from ESPN and Bob Velin from USA Today scoring the fight narrowly for Álvarez 114–113, while others such as Brian Campbell, also from ESPN, and British fighter Stephen Smith had Trout winning 115–112 and 115–114 respectively.

== Fight card ==
Confirmed bouts:

Weight Class	Weight		vs.		Method	Round	Time	Notes
Super Welterweight	154 lbs.	Canelo Álvarez (c-WBC)	def.	Austin Trout (c-WBA)	UD	12		^{note 1}
Lightweight	135 lbs.	Omar Figueroa Jr.	def.	Abner Cotto	KO	1/10	2:57	^{note 2}
Preliminary Card
Light Middleweight	154 lbs.	Jermall Charlo	def.	Orlando Lora	RTD	4/8	3:00
Super Bantamweight	122 lbs.	Andrés Gutiérrez	def.	Salvador Sánchez II	TKO	5/10	1:25	^{note 3}
Super Middleweight	168 lbs.	Terrell Gausha	def.	William Waters	UD	4
Light Middleweight	154 lbs.	Julian Williams	def.	Dashon Johnson	TKO	3/6	1:43
Bantamweight	118 lbs.	Iván Morales	def.	Raul Hidalgo	UD	8
Super Bantamweight	122 lbs.	Omar Gonzalez	def.	Raúl Martínez	SD	4
Super Featherweight	130 lbs.	Miguel Flores	def.	Guadalupe De Leon	UD	4

^Note 1 For WBA, WBC and The Ring Super Welterweight Titles
^Note 2 For Vacant WBA-NABA Interim, WBC FECARBOX and WBC Silver Lightweight Interim Title
^Note 3 For Vacant WBC Silver Super Bantamweight Title

== Broadcasting ==
Country	Broadcaster
Australia	Main Event
Mexico	Televisa
Norway	Viasat Sport
Panama	RPC
United Kingdom	BoxNation
United States	Showtime

Preceded by vs. Josesito López	Canelo Álvarez's bouts 20 April 2013	Succeeded by vs. Floyd Mayweather Jr.
Preceded by vs. Miguel Cotto	Austin Trout's bouts 20 April 2013	Succeeded by vs. Erislandy Lara
