= Alan Sanchez (boxer) =

Mexican boxer (born 1991)

Alan Sánchez
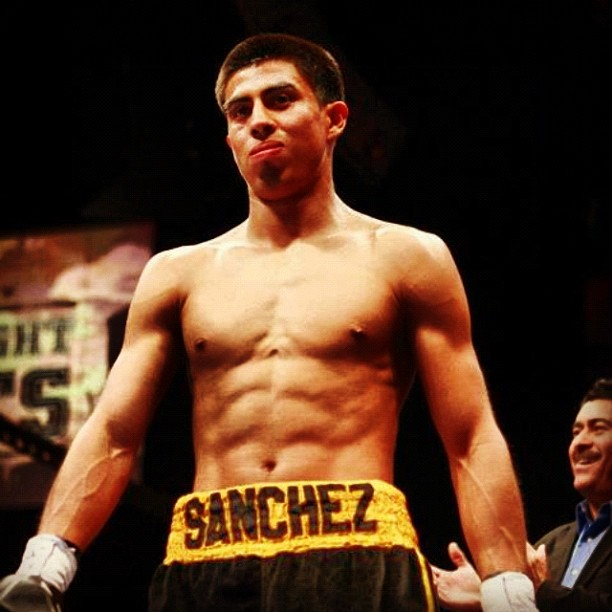

Personal information
- Nationality: Mexican
- Born: Alan Leonardo Sanchez Rivera; February 26, 1991 (age 35) Guadalajara, Jalisco, Mexico
- Height: 5 ft 11 in (1.80 m)
- Weight: Welterweight

Boxing career
- Reach: 69 in (175 cm)
- Stance: orthodox

Boxing record
- Total fights: 33
- Wins: 24
- Win by KO: 10
- Losses: 8
- Draws: 1

Alan Sánchez (born February 26, 1991) is a Mexican professional boxer based in Fairfield, California.

Sánchez is the former WBC Continental Americas welterweight Champion.

== Professional career ==
Sánchez fought on August 25, 2012, in Fairfield, California against welterweight contender Manuel Leyva winning via TKO stoppage in the 10th and final round, the main event of Solo Boxeo Tecate from the Allan Witt Sports Center.

== Professional boxing record ==
33 fights	24 wins	8 losses
By knockout	10	4
By decision	14	4
Draws	1	

No.	Result	Record	Opponent	Type	Round, time	Date	Location	Notes
33	Loss	24–8–1	Omari Jones	TKO	2 (8), 0:49	2 Oct 2026	Caribe Royale, Orlando, Florida, U.S.	
32	Loss	24–7–1	Nicklaus Flaz	TKO	4 (10), 2:07	10 May 2025	Silver Spurs Arena, Kissimmee, Florida, U.S.	
31	Win	24–6–1	Salvador Briceno	MD	8	21 Sep 2024	Thunder Valley Casino Resort, Lincoln, California, U.S.	
30	Loss	23–6–1	Luis Lopez	UD	8	6 Jul 2024	Honda Center, Anaheim, California, U.S.	
29	Win	23–5–1	Angel Beltran	UD	8	5 Aug 2023	American Airlines Center, Dallas, Texas, U.S.	
28	Win	22–5–1	Saul Bustos	MD	8	29 Oct 2022	Cache Creek Casino Resort, Brooks, California, U.S.	Won vacant WBA Fedecentro welterweight title
27	Win	21–5–1	Jose Miguel Borrego	SD	8	1 May 2021	Whitesands Events Center, Plant City, Florida, U.S.	
26	Loss	20–5–1	Daniyar Yeleussinov	TKO	5 (10), 0:19	20 Dec 2019	Talking Stick Resort Arena, Phoenix, Arizona, U.S.	
25	Loss	20–4–1	Alexander Besputin	TKO	9 (10), 1:44	14 Sep 2018	Save Mart Center, Fresno, California, U.S.	For vacant IBF-USBA welterweight title
24	Win	20–3–1	Ramses Agaton	UD	8	10 Feb 2018	Cache Creek Casino Resort, Brooks, California, U.S.	
23	Win	19–3–1	Miguel Angel Huerta	RTD	5 (8), 3:00	23 Jun 2017	Woodland Community Senior Center, Woodland, California, U.S.	
22	Win	18–3–1	Pablo César Cano	SD	10	6 May 2016	Toshiba Plaza, Paradise, Nevada, U.S.	Won vacant WBC Continental Americas welterweight title
21	Win	17–3–1	John Karl Sosa	TKO	6 (8), 2:14	20 Nov 2015	Hard Rock Hotel and Casino, The Joint, Paradise, Nevada, U.S.	
20	Win	16–3–1	Carlos Lozano	UD	8	26 Jun 2015	Salinas Storm House, Salinas, California, U.S.	
19	Win	15–3–1	Ed Paredes	UD	10	4 Dec 2014	Del Mar Fairgrounds, San Diego, California, U.S.	
18	Win	14–3–1	José Luis Ramírez Jr.	KO	3 (8), 2:12	16 Aug 2014	StubHub Center, Carson, California, U.S.	
17	Win	13–3–1	Jorge Silva	TKO	6 (10), 0:42	18 Apr 2014	Illusions Theatre, San Antonio, Texas, U.S.	
16	Loss	12–3–1	Luis Collazo	UD	10	2 Sep 2013	Cowboys Dance Hall, San Antonio, Texas, U.S.	For vacant WBA International welterweight title
15	Yes	12–2–1	Miguel Angel Munguia	TKO	2 (8), 1:43	1 Dec 2012	Georgie Duke Center, Vacaville, California, U.S.	
14	Yes	11–2–1	Manuel Leyva	KO	10 (10), 1:46	25 Aug 2012	Sports Center, Fairfield, California, U.S.	
13	Yes	10–2–1	Artemio Reyes	KO	1 (10), 2:08	13 Apr 2012	Hard Rock Hotel and Casino, The Joint, Paradise, Nevada, U.S.	
12	Yes	9–2–1	Alberto Herrera	UD	8	16 Dec 2011	Woodland Community Senior Center, Woodland, California, U.S.	
11	Yes	8–2–1	Clint Coronel	TKO	7 (8), 2:41	24 Jun 2011	Sports Center, Fairfield, California, U.S.	
10	Yes	7–2–1	John Ryan Grimaldo	UD	8	11 Feb 2011	Sports Center, Fairfield, California, U.S.	
9	Yes	6–2–1	Cristian Favela	UD	8	7 Jan 2011	Sports Center, Fairfield, California, U.S.	
8	Draw	5–2–1	Luis Grajeda	UD	8	10 Sep 2010	Four Points Sheraton Hotel, San Diego, California, U.S.	
7	Loss	5–2	Artemio Reyes	SD	6	18 Jun 2010	Doubletree Hotel, Ontario, California, U.S.	
6	Yes	5–1	Alberto Morales	TKO	5 (6), 0:35	20 Mar 2010	Doubletree Hotel, Ontario, California, U.S.	
5	Loss	4–1	Ricky Duenas	MD	4	5 Dec 2009	Citizens Business Bank Arena, Ontario, California, U.S.	
4	Win	4–0	Raymundo Ortega	UD	4	12 Nov 2009	Four Points Sheraton Hotel, San Diego, California, U.S.	
3	Win	3–0	Mikhail Lyubarsky	TKO	2 (4), 1:06	22 Oct 2009	Tachi Palace Hotel & Casino, Lemoore, California, U.S.	
2	Win	2–0	Mario Angeles	UD	4	27 Aug 2009	Four Points Sheraton Hotel, San Diego, California, U.S.	
1	Win	1–0	Jesse Isais	UD	4	4 Jun 2009	Four Points Sheraton Hotel, San Diego, California, U.S.	
