= Andrés Gutiérrez =

Mexican boxer (born 1993)

Personal information
- Nickname: Jaguarcito
- Born: Andrés Gutiérrez Vera; 8 July 1993 (age 33) Querétaro City, Querétaro, Mexico
- Height: 1.70 m (5 ft 7 in)
- Weight: Bantamweight; Super bantamweight; Featherweight; Super featherweight; Light welterweight

Boxing career
- Reach: 178 cm (70 in)
- Stance: Orthodox

Boxing record
- Total fights: 44
- Wins: 40
- Win by KO: 26
- Losses: 2
- Draws: 2

Andrés Gutiérrez Vera (born 8 July 1993) is a Mexican professional boxer who competed in boxing from 2009 to 2021. He challenged for the WBA featherweight title in 2017.

== Professional career ==
On 7 August 2010 Gutiérrez beat veteran Carlos Aboyte by first round K.O. In July 2017, he was expected to face former WBA featherweight champion Carl Frampton but the fight was cancelled due to Gutierrez slipping in his shower. Frampton had previously missed weight. Gutiérrez lost to Abner Mares in October 2017.

== Personal life ==
Gutiérrez has a family boxing gym in Querétaro, Mexico named "Los 4 Jaguares".

== Professional boxing record ==
| 44 fights | 40 wins | 2 losses |
|---|---|---|
| By knockout | 26 | 0 |
| By decision | 14 | 2 |
| Draws | 2 | |

| No. | Result | Record | Opponent | Type | Round, time | Date | Location | Notes |
|---|---|---|---|---|---|---|---|---|
| 44 | Win | 40–2–2 | Saúl Baños Juárez | TKO | 4 (6), 2:42 | Aug 27, 2022 | Querétaro, Querétaro, Mexico | |
| 43 | Win | 39–2–2 | Jesús Antonio Pérez López | UD | 6 | May 13, 2022 | Hospital Moscati, Querétaro, Mexico | |
| 42 | Draw | 38–2–2 | Ángel Hernández | SD | 8 | Jun 26, 2021 | State Farm Arena, Atlanta, Georgia, U.S. | |
| 41 | Win | 38–2–1 | Tomás Rojas | UD | 12 | Jun 22, 2019 | San Juan del Río, Querétaro, Mexico | |
| 40 | Win | 37–2–1 | Ramiro Blanco | UD | 12 | Nov 10, 2018 | Lienzo Charro Hermanos Ramírez, Corregidora, Mexico | |
| 39 | Win | 36–2–1 | Juan José Martínez | UD | 8 | May 19, 2018 | Polifórum, Playa del Carmen, Mexico | |
| 38 | Loss | 35–2–1 | Abner Mares | TD | 10 (12), 2:40 | Oct 14, 2017 | StubHub Center, Carson, California, U.S. | For WBA (Regular) featherweight title; Unanimous TD: Gutiérrez cut from an accidental head clash |
| 37 | Win | 35–1–1 | Wallington Orobio | TKO | 6 (10), 0:50 | Oct 8, 2016 | Palenque del Ecocentro Expositar El Marqués, Querétaro, Mexico | |
| 36 | Loss | 34–1–1 | Cristian Mijares | RTD | 9 (12), 3:00 | Jun 4, 2016 | Oasis Hotel Complex, Cancún, Mexico | Vacant WBC Silver featherweight title at stake only for Mijares as Gutiérrez missed weight |
| 35 | Win | 34–0–1 | Manuel Dionisio Echenique | RTD | 9 (12), 3:00 | Feb 13, 2016 | Palenque del Ecocentro Expositor El Marqués, Querétaro, Mexico | |
| 34 | Win | 33–0–1 | Daniel Diaz | TKO | 4 (10), 0:51 | Sep 19, 2015 | Emiliano Zapata Sports Center, Ecatepec de Morelos, Mexico | |
| 33 | Win | 32–0–1 | Jhon Gemino | UD | 10 | Jul 11, 2015 | Centro Internacional Acapulco, Acapulco, Mexico | |
| 32 | Win | 31–0–1 | Jairo Ochoa Martínez | UD | 10 | Nov 8, 2014 | Auditorio General Arteaga, Querétaro, Mexico | |
| 31 | Win | 30–0–1 | Mario Antonio Macias | UD | 12 | Aug 9, 2014 | Auditorio General Arteaga, Querétaro, Mexico | Retained WBC Silver super bantamweight title |
| 30 | Win | 29–0–1 | Jairo Ochoa Martínez | MD | 10 | May 10, 2014 | Arena Solidaridad, Monterrey, Mexico | |
| 29 | Win | 28–0–1 | Ernie Sanchez | UD | 12 | Nov 2, 2013 | Auditorio General Arteaga, Querétaro, Mexico | Retained WBC Silver super bantamweight title |
| 28 | Win | 27–0–1 | Rey Perez | UD | 12 | Jul 6, 2013 | Auditorio General Arteaga, Querétaro, Mexico | Retained WBC Silver super bantamweight title |
| 27 | Win | 26–0–1 | Salvador Sánchez II | TKO | 5 (10), 1:25 | Apr 20, 2013 | Alamodome, San Antonio, Texas, U.S. | Won vacant WBC Silver super bantamweight title |
| 26 | Win | 25–0–1 | José Carmona | KO | 2 (10), 3:07 | Feb 2, 2013 | Auditorio General Arteaga, Querétaro, Mexico | Retained WBC FECARBOX featherweight title |
| 25 | Win | 24–0–1 | Hugo Berrio | KO | 4 (10), 1:34 | Nov 24, 2012 | Foro Polanco, Mexico City, Mexico | Won vacant WBC FECARBOX featherweight title |
| 24 | Win | 23–0–1 | Carlos Valcárcel | UD | 6 | Sep 15, 2012 | MGM Grand Garden Arena, Paradise, Nevada, U.S. | |
| 23 | Win | 22–0–1 | Onalvi Sierra | RTD | 9 (12) | Jun 23, 2012 | Gimnasio Miguel Hidalgo Puebla, Mexico | Won vacant IBF International bantamweight title |
| 22 | Win | 21–0–1 | Devis Pérez | RTD | 4 (12), 3:00 | 10 Mar 2012 | Gimnasio de las Liebres, Río Bravo, Mexico | |
| 21 | Win | 20–0–1 | Franklin Varela | TKO | 7 (10), 1:31 | Nov 26, 2011 | Monumental Plaza de Toros México, Mexico City, Mexico | |
| 20 | Win | 19–0–1 | Carlos Raúl Guzmán | TKO | 9 (10), 2:21 | Sep 24, 2011 | Plaza de Toros Juriquilla, Querétaro, Mexico | |
| 19 | Draw | 18–0–1 | Jesús Ruíz García | PTS | 9 | Aug 6, 2011 | Gimnasio Municipal, Navojoa, Mexico | For vacant WBA Fedcentro featherweight title |
| 18 | Win | 18–0 | Genaro Camargo | TKO | 5 (10), 1:58 | May 28, 2011 | Centro de Convenciones, Mazatlán, Mexico | |
| 17 | Win | 17–0 | Tomás Sierra | KO | 4 (10) | Feb 18, 2011 | Querétaro, Querétaro, Mexico | |
| 16 | Win | 16–0 | Juan Carlos Espinosa | TKO | 2 (10) | Dec 4, 2010 | Auditorio General Arteaga, Querétaro, Mexico | |
| 15 | Win | 15–0 | Andrés Romero | UD | 10 | Oct 23, 2010 | Gimnasio San Damián, San Martín Texmelucan, Mexico | |
| 14 | Win | 14–0 | Sergio Vargas | KO | 1 (6) | Sep 4, 2010 | Arena Solidaridad, Monterrey, Mexico | |
| 13 | Win | 13–0 | Juan Carlos Baoyte | KO | 1 (4) | Aug 7, 2010 | Estadio Héctor Espino, Hermosillo, Mexico | |
| 12 | Win | 12–0 | David Galindo Ramos | TKO | 2 (10), 2:55 | Jun 4, 2010 | Coliseo Olímpico de la UG, Guadalajara, Mexico | |
| 11 | Win | 11–0 | Armando Carmona | KO | 2 (10), 2:50 | May 2, 2010 | Auditorio General Arteaga, Querétaro, Mexico | |
| 10 | Win | 10–0 | Enrique Sánchez García | TKO | 3 (4) | Mar 27, 2010 | Arena Monterrey, Monterrey, Mexico | |
| 9 | Win | 9–0 | Rafael Falcón Estrella | KO | 2 (10), 1:32 | Jan 30, 2010 | Arena Municipal, Querétaro, Mexico | |
| 8 | Win | 8–0 | Saturnino Nava | UD | 6 | Nov 20, 2009 | Arena Municipal, Querétaro, Mexico | |
| 7 | Win | 7–0 | David Mercado | KO | 3 (6) | Oct 10, 2009 | Arena Municipal Querétaro, Mexico | |
| 6 | Win | 6–0 | Eduardo Avaca | TKO | 3 (6), 0:37 | Aug 15, 2009 | Auditorio Municipal, Tampico, Mexico | |
| 5 | Win | 5–0 | Cristian López | TKO | 3 (6) | May 30, 2009 | Mercado de Lomas de Casablanca, Querétaro, Mexico | |
| 4 | Win | 4–0 | Alfonso Eliud | TKO | 4 (4), 1:03 | Mar 21, 2009 | Lienzo Charro Dr. Agustín Zaragoza, Valle de Santiago, Mexico | |
| 3 | Win | 3–0 | Juan Manuel Armendáriz | KO | 2 (4) | Feb 21, 2009 | Auditorio Ernesto Rufo, Rosarito, Mexico | |
| 2 | Win | 2–0 | Marcelino Bojórquez | TKO | 2 (4), 1:53 | Feb 14, 2009 | Gimnasio Germán Evers, Mazatlán, Mexico | |
| 1 | Win | 1–0 | Víctor Orozco Mendoza | UD | 4 | Jan 24, 2009 | Coliseo Olímpico de la UG, Guadalajara, Mexico | |
