= Milton Núñez (boxer) =

Colombian boxer (born 1979)

Personal information
- Nickname: El Misil
- Born: Milton Núñez De Orta; 25 September 1979 (age 46) Barranquilla, Colombia
- Height: 1.75 m (5 ft 9 in)
- Weight: Heavyweight; Cruiserweight; Light heavyweight Super middleweight Middleweight; Light middleweight

Boxing career
- Stance: Orthodox

Boxing record
- Total fights: 80
- Wins: 41
- Win by KO: 33
- Losses: 38
- Draws: 1

Milton Núñez (born September 25, 1979) is a Colombian boxer. Núñez's biggest fight was against Gennadiy Golovkin for the interim WBA middleweight title. In this title fight, Núñez lost by knockout in 58 seconds.

Núñez also fought, and lost, against fellow Colombian Nilson Julio Tapia. Milton fought former IBF light middleweight title challenger Deandre Latimore on Showtime on February 24, 2012, where Milton lost by majority decision.

In 2016, Núñez fought future middleweight champion Janibek Alimkhanuly in his debut, losing by a first-round TKO. Other world champion or world title challenger opponents of Núñez include Sergio Mora, Daniel Jacobs, Dmitry Chudinov, and Matt Korobov—all ending in losses.

== Professional Boxing Record ==
80 fights	41 wins	38 losses
By knockout	33	29
By decision	8	9
Draws	1	

No.	Result	Record	Opponent	Type	Round, time	Date	Location	Notes
80	Loss	41–38–1	Phillip Hannah	TKO	4 (6), 0:35	Feb 28, 2026	Villa Olímpica, Santa Marta, Magdalena, Colombia	
79	Loss	41–37–1	Abner Guadalupe	TKO	9 (10), 1:15	May 17, 2025	Coliseo de Pescaito David Ruiz Ureche, Santa Marta, Magdalena, Colombia	
78	Loss	41–36–1	Almat Jumanov	UD	12	Apr 12, 2025	Gimnasio Elite, Cúcuta, Norte de Santander, Colombia	
77	Win	41–35–1	Ronald Montes	UD	8	Feb 28, 2025	Coliseo 16 de mayo, San Pedro de Urabá, Antioquia, Colombia	
76	Loss	40–35–1	Jeremiah Williams	UD	10	Dec 7, 2024	Coliseo de Pescaito David Ruiz Ureche, Santa Marta, Magdalena, Colombia	
75	Loss	40–34–1	Blake McKernan	KO	4 (6), 1:00	Sep 21, 2024	Thunder Valley Casino Resort, Lincoln, California, U.S.	
74	Win	40–33–1	Eduardo Flores	UD	8	Jul 27, 2024	Gimnasio OB Boxing Training, Cúcuta, Norte de Santander, Colombia	
73	Win	39–33–1	Raul Mosquera	UD	6	May 9, 2024	Coliseo Acero Pamplona, Cúcuta, Norte de Santander, Colombia	
72	Loss	38–33–1	Brandon Martin	UD	6	Mar 15, 2024	Olympia Athletic Center, Saint Charles, Missouri, U.S.	
71	Loss	38–32–1	Joshua Temple	KO	2 (6), 2:58	Aug 11, 2023	Ambassador Club, Saint Louis, Missouri, U.S.	
70	Loss	38–31–1	Lorenzo Medina	KO	2 (6), 1:30	Mar 22, 2023	Whitesands Events Center, Plant City, Florida, U.S.	
69	Loss	38–30–1	Carlos Fromento Romero	KO	1 (6), 2:31	Sep 24, 2022	Manual Artime Community Center Theater, Miami, Florida, U.S.	
68	Win	38–29–1	William Moreno Anaya	KO	2 (8), 1:17	May 24, 2022	Club La Amistad, Santa Marta, Sucre, Colombia	
67	Loss	37–29–1	István Bernáth	TKO	3 (8), 0:45	Apr 23, 2022	Abu-Bekr Temple, Sioux City, Iowa, U.S.	
66	Loss	37–28–1	Adrian Pinheiro	KO	2 (4), 1:05	Mar 19, 1977	Convention Center, Tampa, Florida, U.S.	
65	Loss	37–27–1	Siarhei Novikau	KO	2 (6), 2:59	May 22, 2021	Media Pro Studios, Medley, Florida, U.S.	
64	Loss	37–26–1	Andrey Mangushev	UD	6	Jan 30, 2021	Four Ambassadors Hotel, Miami, Florida, U.S.	For vacant American Boxing Federation Atlantic cruiserweight title
63	Loss	37–25–1	Carlouse Welch	RTD	6 (10), 3:00	Dec 10, 2020	Coliseo Renacimiento, Corozal, Sucre, Colombia	For IBA Intercontinental heavyweight title
62	Loss	37–24–1	Anthony Martinez	KO	1 (6), 2:59	Jan 17, 2020	Gulfstream Park Racing & Casino, Hallandale, Florida, U.S.	
61	Loss	37–23–1	Peter Manfredo Jr.	TKO	4 (10), 1:39	Dec 7, 2019	Foxwoods Resort, Mashantucket, Connecticut, U.S.	
60	Win	37–22–1	Edinson Teheran	KO	2 (8), 1:42	Oct 26, 2019	Coliseo Luis Patron Rosano, Santiago de Tolú, Sucre, Colombia	
59	Win	36–22–1	Jose Miguel Rodriguez Berrio	UD	8	Aug 9, 2019	Centro de Recreacion, Santiago de Tolú, Sucre, Colombia	
58	Loss	35–22–1	Frederic Julan	RTD	4 (8), 3:00	Mar 23, 2019	Showboat Hotel & Casino, Atlantic City, New Jersey, U.S.	
57	Loss	35–21–1	Alfonso Lopez	RTD	5 (8), 3:00	Nov 17, 2018	Humble Civic Center, Humble, Texas, U.S.	
56	Loss	35–20–1	Derrick Webster	UD	8	Sep 15, 2018	PAL Center, Hockessin, Delaware, U.S.	
55	Loss	35–19–1	Samuel Clarkson	RTD	3 (10), 3:00	Apr 26, 2018	Anatole Hotel, Dallas, Texas, U.S.	For vacant WBC Continental Americas cruiserweight title
54	Win	35–18–1	Jose Antonio Cervantes	KO	2 (8), 1:00	Feb 3, 2018	Gimnasio Jorge Garcia Beltran, Barranquilla, Atlántico, Colombia	Won NABF middleweight title
53	Win	34–18–1	Jose Miguel Rodriguez Berrio	TKO	3 (8)	Dec 29, 2017	Coliseo Municipal, Cienaga, Magdalena, Colombia	
52	Loss	33–18–1	Brian Vera	RTD	5 (8), 3:00	Jun 24, 2017	San Antonio Shrine Auditorium, San Antonio, Texas, U.S.	For vacant Texas light-heavyweight title (Texas Combative Sports Program)
51	Loss	33–17–1	Janibek Alimkhanuly	TKO	1 (6), 2:25	Oct 29, 2016	Almaty Arena, Almaty, Kazakhstan	
50	Win	33–16–1	Jose Miguel Rodriguez Berrio	UD	6	Aug 5, 2016	Barrio La Magdalena, Barranquilla, Atlántico, Colombia	
49	Loss	32–16–1	Alantez Fox	RTD	4 (8), 3:00	May 8, 2016	Lakeland Events Center, Lakeland, Florida, U.S.	
48	Win	32–15–1	Reynaldo Esquivia	KO	1 (8), 1:45	Mar 4, 2016	Coliseo Luis Patron Rosano, Santiago de Tolú, Sucre, Colombia	
47	Win	31–15–1	Javier Meza	KO	2 (8), 1:21	Dec 26, 2015	Coliseo Luis Patron Rosano, Santiago de Tolú, Sucre, Colombia	
46	Win	30–15–1	Oney Valdez	KO	5 (8), 1:20	Dec 19, 2015	Gimnasio Jorge Garcia Beltran, Barranquilla, Atlántico, Colombia	
45	Win	29–15–1	Edinson Teheran	KO	2 (8), 2:00	Nov 28, 2015	Barrio La Magdalena, Barranquilla, Atlántico, Colombia	
44	Loss	28–15–1	Demond Nicholson	TKO	1 (8), 2:25	Oct 17, 2015	EagleBank Arena, Fairfax, Virginia, U.S.	
43	Loss	28–14–1	Francy Ntetu	UD	8	May 8, 2015	Hilton Westchester, Rye Brook, New York, U.S.	
42	Loss	28–13–1	Gary O'Sullivan	TKO	3 (8), 2:20	Mar 14, 2015	Madison Square Garden, New York City, New York, U.S.	
41	Loss	28–12–1	Trevor McCumby	TKO	6 (8)	Dec 20, 2014	Celebrity Theatre, Phoenix, Arizona, U.S.	
40	Win	28–11–1	Javier Meza	KO	3 (8), 2:45	Sep 7, 2014	Gimnasio Cuadrilatero, Barranquilla, Atlántico, Colombia	
39	Loss	27–11–1	Wilky Campfort	TKO	3 (10), 2:57	Aug 1, 2014	Little Creek Casino Resort, Shelton, Washington, U.S.	
38	Win	27–10–1	Oney Valdez	UD	6	Apr 27, 2014	Colegio Aguas Blancas, Valledupar, Cesar, Colombia	
37	Loss	26–10–1	Daniel Jacobs	TKO	1 (10), 2:25	Mar 15, 2014	Coliseo Rubén Rodríguez, Bayamón, Puerto Rico	
36	Loss	26–9–1	Sergio Mora	KO	5 (8), 2:53	Nov 16, 2013	Citizens Business Bank Arena, Ontario, California, U.S.	
35	Win	26–8–1	Jose Florez	TKO	1 (6)	May 17, 2013	Barrio La Paz, Barranquilla, Atlántico, Colombia	
34	Loss	25–8–1	Manny Siaca	UD	8	Apr 6, 2013	Coliseo Guillermo Angulo, Carolina, Puerto Rico	
33	Loss	25–7–1	Dmitry Chudinov	KO	1 (12), 2:50	Mar 8, 2013	USC Soviet Wings, Moscow, Russia	For vacant interim PABA middleweight title
32	Win	25–6–1	Freddy Barrios	KO	3 (6), 1:50	Nov 24, 2012	Estadio de Softbol Cesar Tou Caraballo, Santiago de Tolú, Sucre, Colombia	
31	Loss	24–6–1	Matt Korobov	UD	8	Oct 27, 2012	County Coliseum, El Paso, Texas, U.S.	
30	Loss	24–5–1	Jorge Melendez	TKO	1 (10), 1:30	Aug 31, 2012	Coliseo Guillermo Angulo, Carolina, Puerto Rico	For WBO Latino junior-middleweight title
29	Win	24–4–1	Raul Mosquera	KO	1 (6), 1:05	Mar 31, 2012	Villa Olimpica, Galapa, Atlántico, Colombia	
28	Loss	23–4–1	Deandre Latimore	MD	10	Feb 24, 2012	Hard Rock Hotel and Casino, Las Vegas, Nevada, U.S.	
27	Win	23–3–1	Howard Cassiani	KO	1 (8), 0:59	May 25, 2011	Gimnasio Jorge Garcia Beltran, Barranquilla, Atlántico, Colombia	
26	Loss	22–3–1	Hugo Kasperski	KO	1 (10)	Mar 18, 2011	Maison des Sports, Clermont-Ferrand, France	For WBC Youth world and WBO Youth super-middleweight titles
25	Win	22–2–1	Javier Meza	KO	3 (8)	Nov 26, 2010	Estadio de Softbol Cesar Tou Caraballo, Santiago de Tolú, Sucre, Colombia	
24	Loss	21–2–1	Gennady Golovkin	KO	1 (12), 0:58	Aug 14, 2010	Arena Roberto Duran, Panama City, Panama	For vacant WBA interim middleweight title
23	Win	21–1–1	Anibal Miranda	TKO	3 (10), 2:00	Apr 17, 2010	Escuela Asociación Unidos de Sahagun, Sahagun, Córdoba, Colombia	Won vacant WBA Fedebol super-welterweight title
22	Win	20–1–1	Howard Cassiani	KO	2 (8), 2:25	Feb 4, 2010	Coliseo Kid Dumlop, Santa Marta, Magdalena, Colombia	
21	Win	19–1–1	Johnny De Horta	TKO	4 (8), 1:59	Jun 19, 2009	Teatro Santa Marta, Santa Marta, Magdalena, Colombia	
20	Win	18–1–1	Diego Castillo	KO	3 (10), 2:51	Feb 13, 2009	Coliseo Gaira, Santa Marta, Magdalena, Colombia	
19	Win	17–1–1	Edinson Teheran	UD	9	Dec 2, 2008	Centro Recreacional Las Vegas, Barranquilla, Atlántico, Colombia	
18	Win	16–1–1	Jose Antonio Cervantes	KO	1 (10)	Nov 13, 2008	Estadio Metropolitano, Barranquilla, Atlántico, Colombia	
17	Win	15–1–1	Ignacio Solar	TKO	2 (10)	Oct 23, 2008	Centro Recreacional Las Vegas, Barranquilla, Atlántico, Colombia	
16	Win	14–1–1	Johnny De Horta	KO	1 (6)	Sep 27, 2008	Coliseo Julio Monsalvo Castilla, Valledupar, Cesar, Colombia	
15	Draw	13–1–1	Segundo Herrera	PTS	8	Aug 16, 2008	Coliseo Menor de Villa Olímpica, Santa Marta, Magdalena, Colombia	
14	Win	13–1	Leo Cassiani	KO	1 (4)	Aug 1, 2008	Centro Recreacional Las Vegas, Barranquilla, Atlántico, Colombia	
13	Win	12–1	Fidel Barrios	KO	2 (6)	Jul 5, 2008	Barrio El Carmen, Barranquilla, Atlántico, Colombia	
12	Loss	11–1	Nilson Julio Tapia	TKO	1 (10), 1:44	Mar 27, 2008	Centro de Convenciones Atlapa, Panama City, Panama	For vacant WBA Fedalatin super-welterweight title
11	Win	11–0	Vicente Camargo	TKO	3 (8)	Dec 20, 2007	Centro Recreacional Las Vegas, Barranquilla, Atlántico, Colombia	
10	Win	10–0	Vicente Camargo	TKO	3 (6)	Oct 21, 2007	Gimnasio Kid Dumlop, Santa Marta, Magdalena, Colombia	
9	Win	9–0	Clemente Perez	KO	2 (6)	Sep 28, 2007	Centro Recreacional Las Vegas, Barranquilla, Atlántico, Colombia	
8	Win	8–0	Juan Morelo	TKO	2 (6)	Aug 25, 2007	Coliseo Humberto Perea, Barranquilla, Atlántico, Colombia	
7	Win	7–0	Felipe Polo	TKO	3 (6)	Jul 6, 2007	Coliseo Humberto Perea, Barranquilla, Atlántico, Colombia	
6	Win	6–0	Wilmer Salazar	KO	1 (4)	Jun 29, 2007	Centro Recreacional Las Vegas, Barranquilla, Atlántico, Colombia	
5	Win	5–0	Jairo Amaris	KO	1 (4)	May 18, 2007	Centro Recreacional Las Vegas, Barranquilla, Atlántico, Colombia	
4	Win	4–0	Eusebio Chiquillo	KO	1 (4)	Mar 31, 2007	Coliseo Kid Dumlop, Santa Marta, Magdalena, Colombia	
3	Win	3–0	Carlos Ortega	PTS	4	Mar 3, 2007	Chibolo, Magdalena, Colombia	
2	Win	2–0	Miguel Lora	KO	4 (4)	Dec 15, 2006	Centro Recreacional Las Vegas, Barranquilla, Atlántico, Colombia	
1	Win	1–0	Felipe Polo	RTD	3 (4)	May 12, 2006	Centro Recreacional Las Vegas, Barranquilla, Atlántico, Colombia	

Sporting positions
Regional boxing titles
Vacant Title last held by David Zegarra	WBA Fedebol super-welterweight champion 17 Apr 2010 – August 2010; Vacated	Vacant Title next held by Jean Carlos Prada
