= Luis Grajeda =

Mexican boxer

Luis Enríquez Grajeda
Personal information
- Born: Luis Enríquez Grajeda; 28 December 1986 (age 39) Chihuahua, Chihuahua, Mexico
- Height: 1.82 m (6 ft 0 in)
- Weight: welterweight

Boxing career
- Reach: 1.80 cm (1 in)
- Stance: Orthodox

Boxing record
- Total fights: 25
- Wins: 18
- Win by KO: 14
- Losses: 5
- Draws: 2
- No contests: 0

Luis Enríquez Grajeda (born 28 December 1986) is a Mexican professional boxer. He is signed with Oscar De La Hoya's Company Golden Boy Promotions.

== Amateur career ==
Grajeda had an impressive amateur career, winning the Mexican National Championships in 2005 and 2007. Luis would also get to the quarterfinals of the 2007 Pan American Games.

== Professional career ==
Grajeda turned professional on May 24, 2008, stopping Juan Pablo Vazquez in the 2nd round. He fought a tough four round battle with Jair Cena ending in an MD win, Grajeda has improved, winning each of his next 4 matches by 1st-round KO. In a Friday Night Fights card Grajeda took a four-round unanimous decision over Osvaldo Rojas.

=== Professional record ===
18 Wins (14 knockouts), 5 Losses, 2 Draw
Res.	Record	Opponent	Type	Rd., Time	Date	Location	Notes
Loss	18-5-2	(United States) Terrell Gausha	UD	8	2015-06-20	(United States) MGM Grand, Grand Garden Arena, Las Vegas, Nevada, US	
Loss	18-4-2	(United States) Austin Trout	RTD	7 (10)	2014-12-11	(United States) Pechanga Resort & Casino, Temecula, California	
Win	18-3-2	(Mexico) Charly Soto	TKO	3 (?)	2014-11-15	(Mexico) Club de Veteranos bamoa Pueblo, Guasave, Sinaloa	
Loss	17-3-2	(United States) Willie Nelson	UD	10	2014-08-08	(United States) Churchill County Fairgrounds, Fallon, Nevada	
Draw	17-2-2	(Morocco) Said El Harrak	SD	8	2014-05-20	(United States) Santa Monica Pier, Santa Monica, California	
Lose	17-2-1	(Mexico) Pablo Munguia	SD	8	2014-02-08	San Luis Potosi, San Luis Potosí, Mexico	
Win	17-1-1	(Mexico) Manuel Garcia	KO	8(8)	2013-10-19	Jose Cuervo Salon, Polanco, Distrito Federal, Mexico	
Win	16-1-1	(Mexico) Josue Atilano Mendoza	KO	1(8)	2013-09-27	Jose Cuervo Salon, Polanco, Distrito Federal, Mexico	
Win	15-1-1	(Mexico) Octavio Castro	TKO	7(12)	2013-05-31	Centro Historico, Chihuahua, Chihuahua, Mexico	
Win	14-1-1	(Mexico) Francisco Javier Reza	UD	10(10)	2012-11-16	Ciudad Parral, Chihuahua, Mexico	
Win	13-1-1	(Puerto Rico) Hector Camacho Jr	KO	6(1:28)	2012-07-28	Parque el Palomar, Chihuahua, Chihuahua, Mexico	
Win	12-1-1	(Mexico) Alberto Martinez	KO	?	2012-06-09	Gimnasio Manuel Bernardo Aguirre, Chihuahua, Chihuahua, Mexico	
Win	11-1-1	(Mexico) Nestor Antonio Figueroa	KO	1(1:44)	2012-03-03	Gimnasio Municipal, Delicias, Chihuahua, Mexico	
Loss	10-1-1	(United States) Jermell Charlo	UD	8(8)	2010-11-12	State Farm Arena, Hidalgo, Texas, United States	
Draw	10-0-1	(United States) Alan Sanchez	PTS	8(8)	2010-09-10	Four Points Sheraton Hotel, San Diego, California, United States	
Win	10-0-0	(Mexico) Cristian Favela	UD	6(6)	2010-06-11	Four Points Sheraton Hotel, San Diego, California, United States	
Win	9-0-0	(United States) Osvaldo Rojas	UD	4(4)	2010-02-26	Don Haskins Convention Center, El Paso, Texas, United States	
Win	8-0-0	(Mexico) Ruben Amezcua	TKO	6(8)	2009-12-12	Auditorio Miguel Barragan, San Luis Potosí, Mexico	
Win	7-0-0	(United States) Juan Carlos Diaz	KO	2(2:48)	2009-10-10	Nokia Theater, Los Angeles, California, United States	
Win	6-0-0	(Mexico) Aaron Martinez	TKO	1(0:31)	2009-04-25	Arena Miguel Canto Solis, Cozumel, Quintana Roo, Mexico	
Win	5-0-0	(Mexico) Alejandro Herrera	KO	1(4)	2009-02-21	Auditorio Benito Juárez, Zapopan, Jalisco, Mexico	
Win	4-0-0	(Mexico) Gilberto Avila	TKO	1(4)	2009-01-31	Palenque del FEX, Mexicali, Baja California, Mexico	
Win	3-0-0	(Mexico) Mario Ramirez	KO	1(1:28)	2008-11-01	Gimnasio Manuel Bernardo Aguirre, Chihuahua, Chihuahua, Mexico	
Win	2-0-0	(Mexico) Jair Cena	MD	4(4)	2008-09-20	Arena Coliseo, Monterrey, Nuevo León, Mexico	
Win	1-0-0	(Mexico) Juan Pablo Vazquez	TKO	2(1:09)	2008-05-24	La Feria de Santa Rita, Chihuahua, Chihuahua, Mexico	
