= Nilson Julio Tapia =

Colombian boxer (born 1985)

Personal information
- Nickname: Blade / El Arpía
- Nationality: Colombian
- Born: Nilson Alberto Julio Tapia; 5 September 1985 (age 40) Acandi, Colombia
- Height: 1.82 m (6 ft 0 in)
- Weight: Middleweight

Boxing career
- Stance: Orthodox

Boxing record
- Total fights: 20
- Wins: 15
- Win by KO: 11
- Losses: 3
- Draws: 1
- No contests: 1

Nilson Julio Tapia (born September 5, 1985) is a Colombian middleweight boxer. Nilson 's biggest fight was against Gennadiy Golovkin for the regular WBA middleweight title. In this title fight, Nilson lost by knockout in the third round.

Nilson has defeated fellow Colombian boxer Milton Nunez.

Regional Championships
Vacant Title last held by Alfonso Mosquera	WBA Super Welterweight Champion; Fedalatin title March 27, 2008 - October 5, 2009	Succeeded by Austin Trout
