= Loren Goodman =

American poet

Loren Goodman (born 1968) is an American postmodern poet and associate professor of English literature and creative writing at Underwood International College, Yonsei University, in Seoul, South Korea.

== Biography and education ==
Goodman is a native of Wichita, Kansas. He received a BA degree in philosophy from Columbia University (1991), a MFA degree in poetry from the University of Arizona, and PhD degrees in English literature and sociology from State University of New York at Buffalo (2006) and Kobe University, respectively.

== Yale Series of Younger Poets Competition ==
Goodman’s collection of poems Famous Americans (Yale University Press, 2003) was selected by Pulitzer Prize-winning American poet W. S. Merwin as the 2003 winner of the Yale Series of Younger Poets Competition, appearing as volume ninety-seven in the series. Merwin compared Goodman to the Dadaists and said the aim of his poetry is "plain ridicule” and the "revelation of nonsense” in the form of “comic writing” (Foreword, 2003, pp. vii, ix).

== Japanese Boxing ==
During his studies in Japan Goodman trained as an amateur boxer. He has also written on Japanese boxing culture, including a case study with interviews of professional middleweights Keitoku Senrima, Hisashi Teraji, Yoshinori Nishizawa, Tetsu Yokozaki, Kevin Palmer, Hiromi Amada, and Nobuhiro Ishida.

== Published books ==
- Famous Americans. New Haven, CT: Yale University Press, 2003. 81 pp. ISBN 978-0-300-10002-0.
- Suppository Writing. Southampton, MA: Chuckwagon, 2008. 24 pp. Unpaginated.
