= Jayson Vélez =

Puerto Rican boxer

Personal information
- Nickname: La Maravilla
- Nationality: Puerto Rican
- Born: Jayson Vélez Jiménez; March 9, 1988 (age 38) Caguas, Puerto Rico
- Height: 5 ft 8 in (173 cm)
- Weight: Super bantamweight; Featherweight; Super featherweight

Boxing career
- Reach: 68 in (173 cm)
- Stance: Orthodox

Boxing record
- Total fights: 41
- Wins: 30
- Win by KO: 21
- Losses: 10
- Draws: 1

Jayson Vélez Jiménez (born March 9, 1988) is a Puerto Rican professional boxer who challenged for the IBF featherweight title in 2014.

== Professional career ==
=== WBC Silver Featherweight Championship ===
Velez beat Salvador Sánchez II for the vacant WBC Silver Featherweight Championship.

== Professional boxing record ==
38 fights	29 wins	8 losses
By knockout	21	2
By decision	8	6
Draws	1	

No.	Result	Record	Opponent	Type	Round, time	Date	Location	Notes
38	Loss	29–8–1	(United States) Gabriel Flores Jr.	TKO	6 (10), 1:47	Feb 20, 2021	(United States) MGM Grand, Paradise, Nevada, U.S.	
37	Loss	29–7–1	(Mexico) Óscar Valdez	TKO	10 (10), 2:23	Jul 21, 2020	(United States) MGM Grand, Paradise, Nevada, U.S.	
36	Loss	29–6–1	(Panama) Jaime Abroleda	SD	12	Feb 8, 2020	(United States) PPL Center, Allentown, Pennsylvania, U.S.	
35	Win	29–5–1	(Mexico) Hector Ruben Ambriz Suarez	TKO	7 (10)	Jul 27, 2019	(United States) Royal Farms Arena, Baltimore, Maryland, U.S.	
34	Win	28–5–1	(Mexico) Victor Terrazas	TKO	4 (10)	Mar 16, 2019	Coliseo Rafael G Amalbert, Juncos, Puerto Rico	
33	Win	27–5–1	(Puerto Rico) Orlando Cruz	KO	2 (10)	Sep 22, 2018	Coliseo Rafael G Amalbert, Juncos, Puerto Rico	
32	Loss	26–5–1	(United States) Ryan Garcia	UD	10	May 4, 2018	(United States) StubHub Center, Carson, California, U.S.	
31	Win	26–4–1	(Puerto Rico) Juan Manuel López	TKO	12 (12), 1:54	Mar 3, 2018	Coliseo Mario Quijote Morales, Guaynabo, Puerto Rico	
30	Win	25–4–1	(Mexico) Giovanni Caro	KO	5 (8), 1:53	Jul 8, 2017	Palacio de los Deportes, Mayagüez, Puerto Rico	
29	Win	24–4–1	(Puerto Rico) Alberto Mercado	UD	10	Mar 4, 2017	Coliseo Fernando Hernández, Gurabo, Puerto Rico	
28	Loss	23–4–1	(Puerto Rico) Alfredo Santiago	MD	10	Dec 10, 2016	Coliseo Cosme Beitia Salamo, Cataño, Puerto Rico	
27	Loss	23–3–1	(Nicaragua) Rene Alvarado	SD	10	Jul 15, 2016	(United States) Fantasy Springs Resort Casino, Indio, California, U.S.	
26	Loss	23–2–1	(United States) Joseph Diaz	UD	10	Mar 26, 2016	(United States) Oracle Arena, Oakland, California, U.S.	
25	Loss	23–1–1	(United States) Ronny Rios	UD	10	Nov 21, 2015	(United States) Mandalay Bay Events Center Paradise, Nevada, U.S.	
24	Win	23–0–1	(Mexico) Daniel Ramirez	UD	10	Jun 4, 2015	(United States) Belasco Theatre, Los Angeles, California, U.S.	
23	Draw	22–0–1	(Russia) Evgeny Gradovich	SD	12	Nov 29, 2014	(United States) CenturyLink Center, Omaha, Nebraska, U.S.	For IBF featherweight title
