= Rigoberto Álvarez =

Mexican boxer (born 1978)

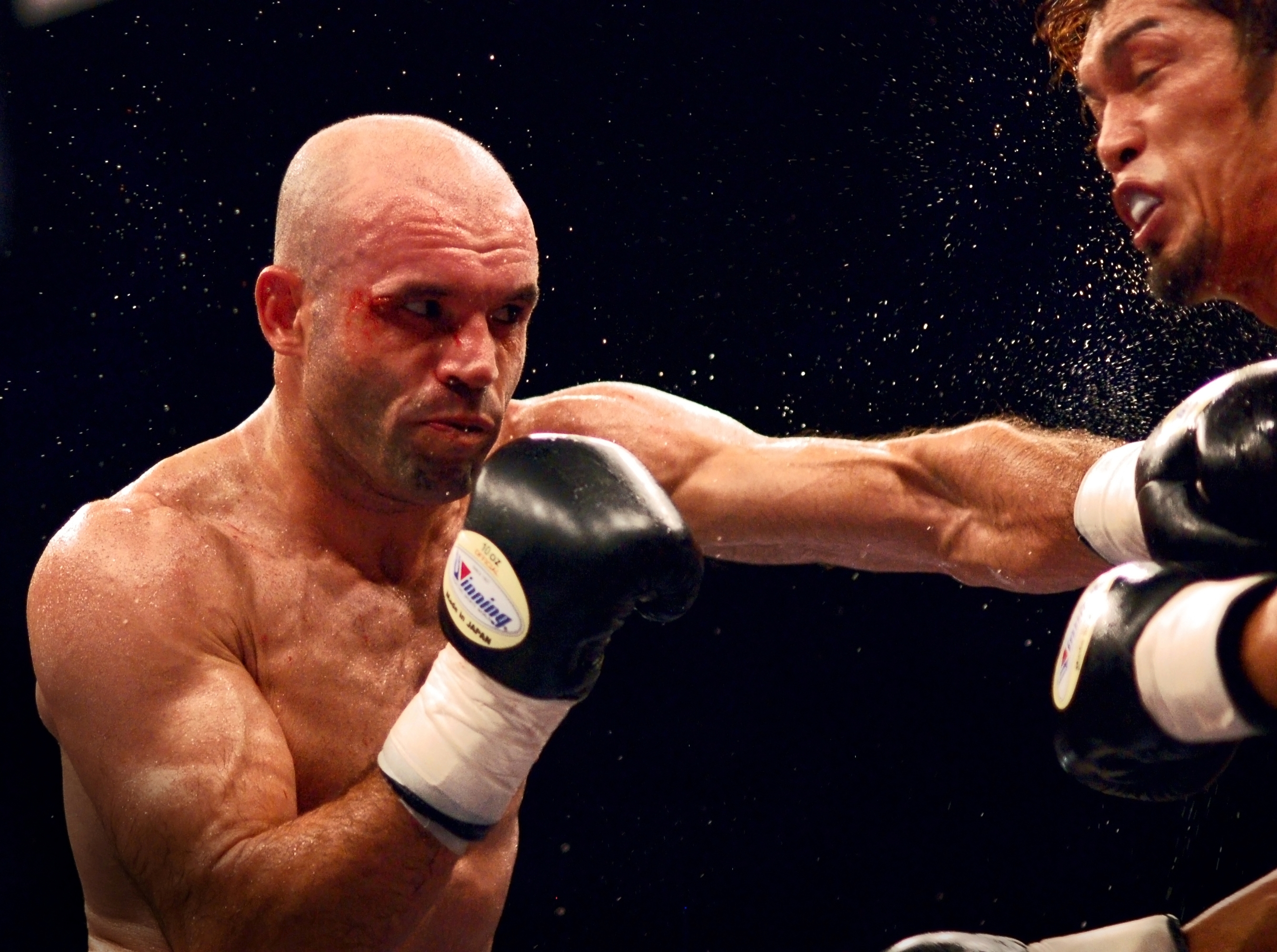
- Álvarez fighting against Ishida in 2010

Personal information
- Nicknames: El Español "The Spaniard"
- Born: Rigoberto Álvarez Barragán; January 20, 1978 (age 48) Tlajomulco de Zúñiga, Jalisco, Mexico
- Height: 5 ft 11 in (180 cm)
- Weight: Light middleweight Middleweight; Super middleweight

Boxing career
- Reach: 74 in (189 cm)
- Stance: Southpaw

Boxing record
- Total fights: 31
- Wins: 27
- Win by KO: 20
- Losses: 4

Rigoberto Álvarez Barragán (born January 20, 1978) is a Mexican former professional boxer who competed from 2000 to 2011. Rigo is a former WBC FECARBOX super middleweight and interim WBA light middleweight champion.

== Early life ==
Álvarez comes from a big boxing family, his brothers are welterweight prospects Ramón Álvarez, Ricardo Álvarez and the former Undisputed Super Middleweight champion, Canelo Álvarez.

== Professional career ==
Álvarez lost a close decision to William Gare in South Africa for the World Boxing Foundation super middleweight title.

In January 2010 he suffered his second loss by TKO to Marco Antonio Rubio for the WBC Latino middleweight title.

=== WBA World Light Middleweight championship ===
On October 9, 2010 Rigoberto fought Nobuhiro Ishida of Japan for his interim WBA Light Middleweight Championship. Álvarez defeated Ishida by decision.

== Professional boxing record ==
31 fights	27 wins	4 losses
By knockout	20	1
By decision	7	3

No.	Result	Record	Opponent	Type	Round, time	Date	Location	Notes
31	Loss	27–4	(Australia) Anthony Mundine	UD	12 (12)	2011-10-19	(Australia) Entertainment Centre, Newcastle	For WBA interim light middleweight title
30	Loss	27–3	(United States) Austin Trout	UD	12 (12)	2011-02-05	(Mexico) Arena Coliseo, Guadalajara	For vacant WBA (Regular) light middleweight title
29	Win	27–2	(Japan) Nobuhiro Ishida	SD	12 (12)	2010-10-09	(Mexico) Mesón de los Deportes, Tepic	Won WBA interim light middleweight title
28	Win	26–2	(Mexico) Alfredo Trevino	TKO	1 (8)	2010-07-10	(Mexico) Arena VFG, Guadalajara	
27	Win	25–2	(Mexico) Mauro Romero	TKO	2 (8)	2010-06-12	(Mexico) Centro de Convenciones, Puebla	
26	Loss	24–2	(Mexico) Marco Antonio Rubio	TKO	9 (12)	2010-01-16	(Mexico) Auditorio Centenario, Gomez Palacio	For WBC Latino Middleweight title
25	Win	24–1	(Mexico) Fernando Vela	RTD	3 (8)	2009-10-03	(Mexico) Coliseo Olimpico de la UG, Guadalajara	
24	Loss	23–1	(South Africa) William Gare	UD	12 (12)	2009-08-07	(South Africa) Mangaung Indoor Centre, Bloemfontein	
23	Win	23–0	(Mexico) Eduardo Ayala	RTD	6 (8)	2009-03-28	(Mexico) Plaza de Toros, Tijuana	
22	Win	22–0	(Mexico) Jose Humberto Corral	KO	4 (12)	2009-01-24	(Mexico) Coliseo Olimpico de la UG, Guadalajara	
21	Win	21–0	(Mexico) Erik Rafael Esquivel	KO	4 (12)	2008-10-04	(Mexico) Palenque Zapopum, Zapopan	
20	Win	20–0	(Mexico) Felipe Romero	KO	3 (12)	2008-06-28	(Mexico) Palenque Calle 2, Zapopan	Won Mexico Super Middleweight title
19	Win	19–0	(Mexico) Roberto Tena	KO	1 (12)	2008-05-30	(Mexico) Guadalajara	
18	Win	18–0	(Mexico) Juan Albarran	TKO	2 (10)	2008-04-04	(Mexico) Salon El General, Guadalajara	
17	Win	17–0	(Mexico) Alvaro Enriquez	TKO	2 (10)	2007-12-15	(Mexico) Auditorio Benito Juarez, Guadalajara	
16	Win	16–0	(Mexico) Arturo Elizalde	TKO	2 (10)	2007-10-19	(Mexico) Arena Jalisco, Guadalajara	
15	Win	15–0	(Mexico) Alfredo Contreras	KO	1 (8)	2007-08-18	(Mexico) Coliseo Olimpico de la UG, Guadalajara	
14	Win	14–0	(Mexico) Francisco Sierra	KO	10 (10)	2006-12-15	(Mexico) Arena Jalisco, Guadalajara	
13	Win	13–0	(Mexico) Hugo Lomeli	KO	4 (12)	2006-10-20	(Mexico) Guadalajara	
12	Win	12–0	(Mexico) Armando Patino	KO	1 (10)	2006-09-22	(Mexico) Guadalajara	
11	Win	11–0	(Mexico) Francisco Sierra	PTS	12 (12)	2006-04-15	(Mexico) Tuxpan	
10	Win	10–0	(Mexico) Juan Carlos Sanchez	KO	1 (8)	2006-02-24	(Mexico) Arena Coliseo, Guadalajara	
9	Win	9–0	(Mexico) Juan Carlos Sanchez	KO	1 (10)	2006-02-04	(Mexico) Guadalajara	
8	Win	8–0	(Mexico) Antonio Gonzalez	PTS	10 (10)	2005-08-26	(Mexico) Manzanillo	
7	Win	7–0	(Mexico) Roberto Cruz	PTS	8 (8)	2004-12-04	(Mexico) Manzanillo	
6	Win	6–0	(Mexico) Antonio Contreras	KO	1 (4)	2002-04-13	(Mexico) Tijuana	
5	Win	5–0	(Mexico) Julian Venegas	KO	1 (8)	2001-06-15	(Mexico) Tepic	
4	Win	4–0	(Mexico) Jaime Enriquez	PTS	8 (8)	2001-03-16	Mexico	
3	Win	3–0	(Mexico) Hugo Lomeli	UD	8 (8)	2000-11-02	(Mexico) Guadalajara	
2	Win	2–0	(Mexico) Jaime Enriquez	PTS	8 (8)	2000-09-08	(Mexico) Gimnasio Municipal, Ciudad Obregon	
1	Win	1–0	(Mexico) Ismael Rodriguez	KO	1 (8)	2000-02-01	(Mexico) Ciudad Guzman	

== See also ==
- Notable boxing families

Sporting positions
Regional boxing titles
Preceded by Felipe Romero	Mexico Super Middleweight champion June 28, 2008 – 2009; Vacated	Vacant Title next held by Francisco Sierra
World boxing titles
Preceded by Nobuhiro Ishida	WBA Super welterweight champion Interim title October 9, 2010 – February 5, 2011; Lost bid for full title	Vacant Title next held by Anthony Mundine
