= Joey Hernandez =

American boxer

Personal information
- Nickname: Twinkle Fingers
- Born: October 16, 1984 (age 41) Miami, Florida, US
- Height: 5 ft 8 in (173 cm)
- Weight: Light Middleweight

Boxing career
- Stance: Southpaw

Boxing record
- Total fights: 33
- Wins: 27
- Win by KO: 17
- Losses: 5
- Draws: 1
- No contests: 0

Joseph Alexander Hernandez (born October 16, 1984) is a Cuban American boxer.

== Professional boxing career ==
A southpaw, Hernandez turned professional on December 16, 2006, winning a four round decision over Eduardo Adorno at the Miccosukee Indian Gaming Resort in Miami, Florida. Hernandez won the vacant USBO light middleweight title on March 25, 2011, in River Grove, Illinois by disqualification in the eighth round of a scheduled twelve rounder when Angel Hernandez, his opponent, was disqualified after repeated fouling.

== Personal life ==
Hernandez resides in Miami Beach, Florida.
