= José Charles =

Mexican boxer (born 1993)

Jose Charles
Personal information
- Nickname: Matador
- Born: Jose Charles; 19 August 1993 (age 33) Reynosa, Tamaulipas, Mexico
- Height: 6 ft 1 in (185 cm)
- Weight: Light middleweight

Boxing career
- Reach: 75 in (192 cm)
- Stance: Orthodox

Boxing record
- Total fights: 20
- Wins: 18
- Win by KO: 13
- Losses: 1
- Draws: 1
- No contests: 0

Jose Charles (born 19 August 1993) is a Mexican professional boxer.

== Professional career ==
On April 2, 2011, Charles knocked out the veteran Juan Hernandez at the Arena JUBA in Reynosa, Tamaulipas, Mexico.
