= Anthony Martinez (boxer) =

American boxer

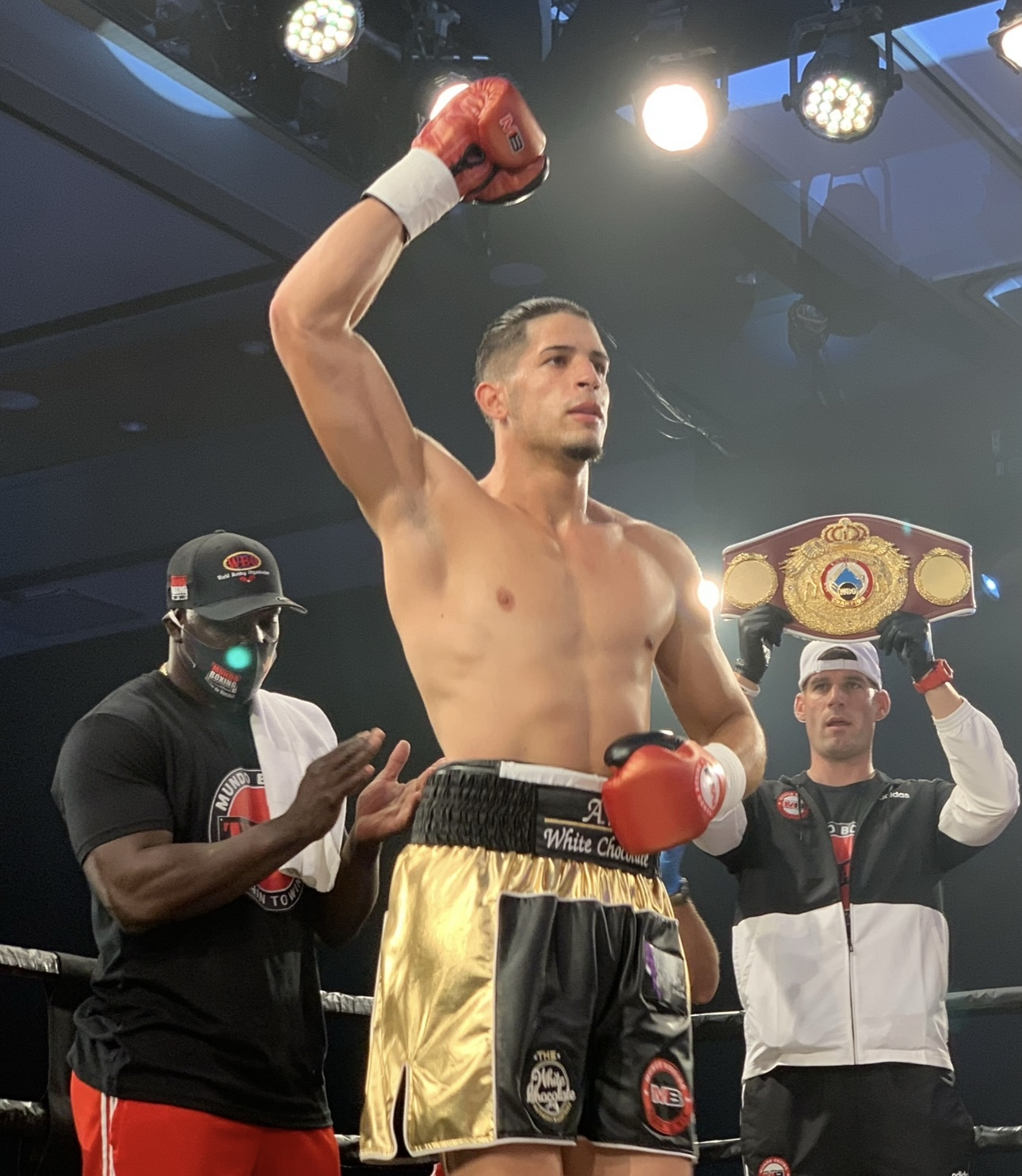

Personal information
- Nickname: White Chocolate
- Nationality: American
- Born: Anthony Martinez; January 8, 1999 (age 27) Miami, Florida
- Height: 6 ft 5 in (1.96 m)
- Weight: Cruiserweight; Heavyweight

Boxing career
- Reach: 78 in (198 cm)
- Stance: Orthodox

Boxing record
- Total fights: 22
- Wins: 20
- Win by KO: 18
- Losses: 2
- Draws: 0

Anthony Martinez also known as White Chocolate (born 8 January 1999), is an American professional boxer. He has held the WBA–NABA heavyweight title, the IBO Ibero-American heavyweight title, and the WBO Latino cruiserweight title.

== Early life ==
He was born in Miami, Florida, into a Cuban family. His father introduced him to boxing in Allapattah, Florida, at the age of 12 years old.

== Career ==
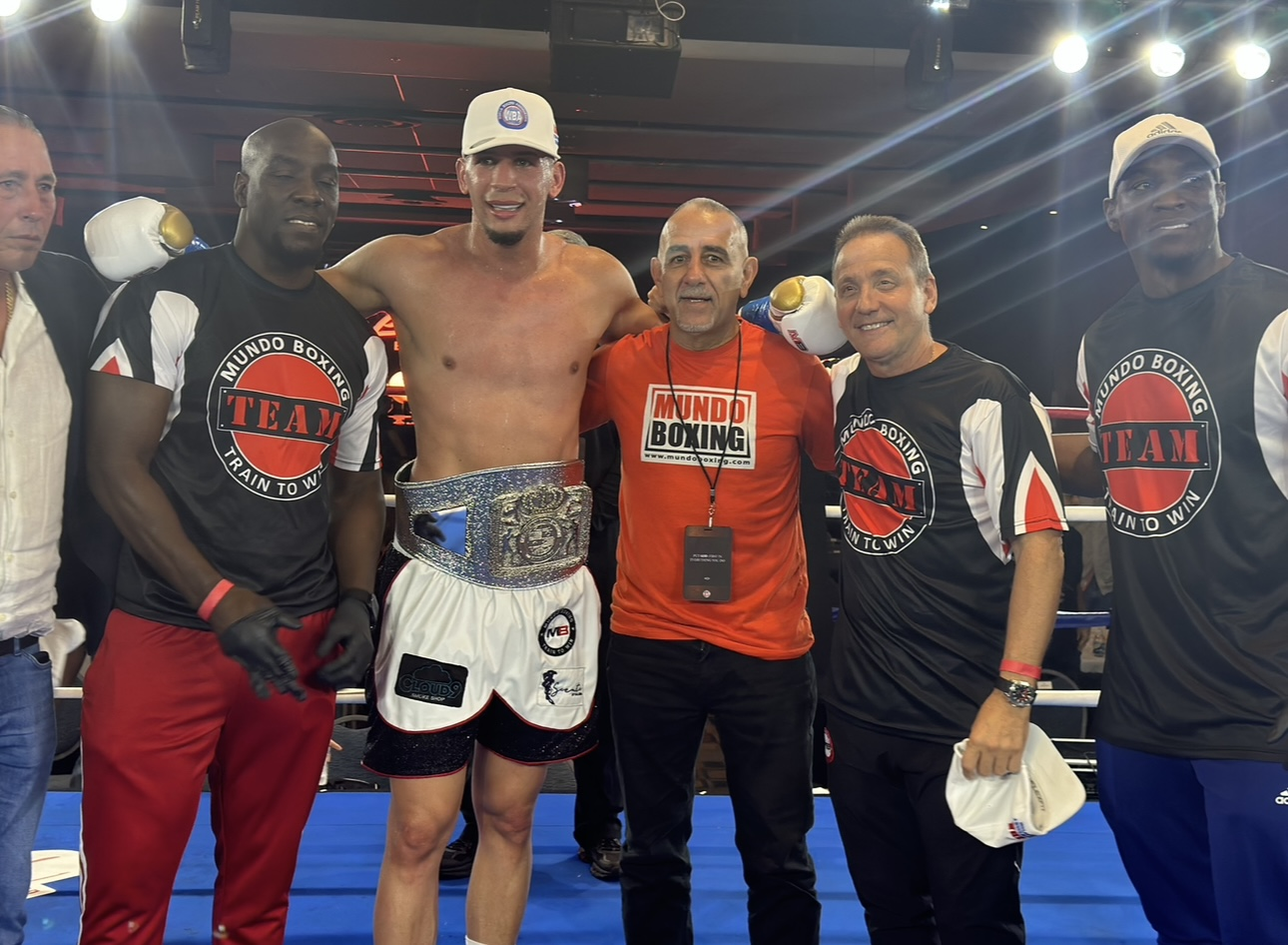

Martinez started participating in amateur boxing at age 12 during which he won state honors, including two Florida golden gloves championships and the Florida State P.A.L championship. At 17, he transitioned to professional boxing, joining Mundo Boxing, led by trainer Pedro Diaz. He is also trained by Cuban boxer Yordanis Despaigne. He debuted professionally on February 24, 2018. He became the WBO Latino champion on March 6, 2021, and successfully defended his title against Christian Galvez.

He was the training partner of Tyron Woodley in Woodley's fight against Jake Paul. He was ranked 15 in the WBO cruiserweight category in 2021 after winning his cruiserweight title against Evert Bravo. He has appeared in videos of rappers El Alfa and Farruko. He became the IBO Ibero-American heavyweight champion on Dec 14, 2024 upon defeating Brayan Santander.

Martinez has taken part in 22 fights, with a record of 20 wins and two losses, with 18 of his 20 wins by knockout. He has fought against Alejandro Berrio, Milton Nunez, Fulgencio Zuniga, Evert Bravo, amongst others during the course of his career. His two losses came from fighting Ismael Ocles and David Light, the former by a four-round split decision in just his second bout, and the latter by a first-round KO.

== Professional boxing record ==
22 fights	20 wins	2 losses
By knockout	18	1
By decision	2	1
Draws	0	

No.	Result	Record	Opponent	Type	Round, time	Date	Location	Notes
22	Win	20–2	Brayan Santander	KO	2 (10), 1:53	14 Dec 2024	Grand Hyatt Baha Mar, Nassau, Bahamas	Won vacant IBO Ibero-American heavyweight title
21	Win	19–2	Francisco Silvens Mateo	TKO	2 (10), 1:05	15 Jun 2024	Club Deportivo Cultural Rafael Lorenzo, Santo Domingo, Dominican Republic	
20	Win	18–2	Carlos Rafael Cruz	TKO	1 (10), 2:29	20 Dec 2023	Pabellon de Esgrima, Centro Olimpico, Santo Domingo, Dominican Republic	
19	Win	17–2	Jackson dos Santos	KO	2 (10), 2:30	7 Oct 2023	District Bar de la 93, Bogotá, Colombia	
18	Win	16–2	Epifanio Mendoza	RTD	2 (8), 3:00	5 Jul 2023	Coliseo de Pescaito David Ruiz Ureche, Santa Marta, Magdalena, Colombia	
17	Win	15–2	Santander Silgado Gelez	UD	10	3 Mar 2023	Miami Airport Convention Center, Miami, Florida, U.S.	Won vacant WBA–NABA heavyweight title
16	Win	14–2	Alejandro Berrio	TKO	3 (10), 2:49	19 Nov 2022	Coliseo de Pescaito David Ruiz Ureche, Santa Marta, Magdalena, Colombia	
15	Win	13–2	Deibis Berrocal	RTD	4 (10), 3:00	26 Sep 2022	Coliseo Menor de Villa Olímpica, Santa Marta, Magdalena, Colombia	
14	Loss	12–2	David Light	KO	1 (10), 2:57	31 Oct 2020	Hialeah Park Racing & Casino, Hialeah, Florida, U.S.	For vacant WBO International cruiserweight title
13	Win	12–1	Alejandro Gustavo Falliga	TKO	1 (8), 2:52	11 Feb 2022	Miami Airport Convention Center, Miami, Florida, U.S.	
12	Win	11–1	Deivis Casseres	KO	2 (10), 0:53	21 Nov 2021	Pabellon de Esgrima, Centro Olimpico, Santo Domingo, Dominican Republic	
11	Win	10–1	Cristian Galvez	TKO	2 (10), 1:28	4 Jun 2021	Hotel Catalonia Malecon Center, Santo Domingo, Dominican Republic	Defeded WBO Latino cruiserweight title
10	Win	9–1	Evert Bravo	TKO	3 (10), 0:58	6 Mar 2021	InterContinental Miami, Miami, Florida, U.S.	Won vacant WBO Latino cruiserweight title
9	Win	8–1	Samuel Miller	KO	1 (8), 2:45	29 Oct 2020	Colegio Millan Vargas, Sampués, Sucre, Colombia	
8	Win	7–1	Milton Núñez	KO	1 (6), 2:59	17 Jan 2020	Gulfstream Park Racing & Casino, Hallandale, Florida, U.S.	
7	Win	6–1	Fulgencio Zúñiga	UD	6	18 Nov 2019	Centro de Recreacion, Santiago de Tolú, Sucre, Colombia	
6	Win	5–1	Dumar Carrascal	RTD	2 (6), 3:00	21 Sep 2019	Bar Master Pub Unicentro, Girardot, Cundinamarca, Colombia	
5	Win	4–1	Jose Calyecac	KO	1 (4), 1:30	24 May 2019	Institución Educativa Simón Bolívar, Planeta Rica, Córdoba, Colombia	
4	Win	3–1	Aneudy Marte Rodriguez	TKO	1 (4), 0:48	14 Apr 2019	Club Luperon, Santo Domingo, Dominican Republic	
3	Win	2–1	Ivan Basurto Monroy	TKO	1 (4), 1:55	2 Feb 2019	Gimnasio Multiuso Nani Marrero, Santiago de los Caballeros, Dominican Republic	
2	Loss	1–1	Ismael Ocles	SD	4	31 Aug 2018	Convention Center, West Palm Beach, Florida, U.S.	
1	Win	1–0	Sebastian Palacios Rodriguez	TKO	4 (4)	24 Feb 2018	Arena Coliseo, Mexico City, Mexico	
