= Artêmio Sarcinelli =

Brazilian footballer

Sarcinelli
Personal information
- Full name: Artêmio Sarcinelli
- Date of birth: 29 December 1932
- Place of birth: Ibiraçu, Brazil
- Date of death: 28 November 2006 (aged 73)
- Place of death: João Neiva, Brazil
- Position: Forward

Youth career
- Ferroviária (João Neiva)

Senior career*
Years	Team	Apps	(Gls)
1952–1953	São Cristóvão		
1954–1956	São Paulo	23	(5)
1956–1957	Flamengo	4	(2)

Managerial career
- 1973: Desportiva-ES
- * Club domestic league appearances and goals as of 28 December 2023

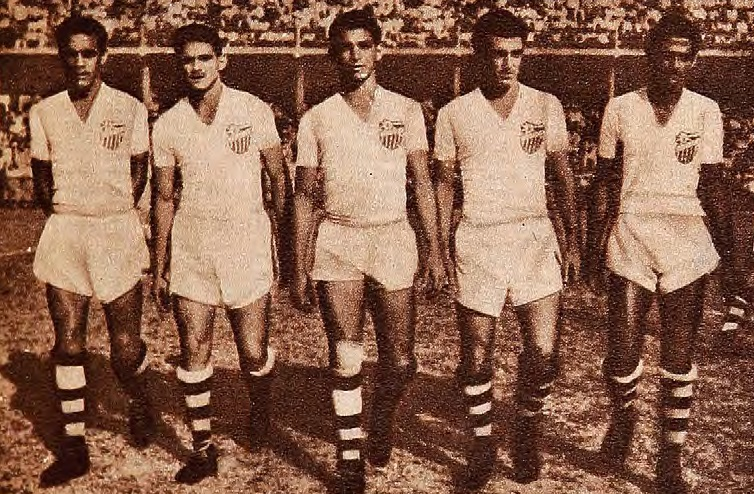

Artêmio Sarcinelli (29 December 1932 – 28 November 2006), simply known as Sarcinelli, was a Brazilian professional footballer who played as a forward.

== Career ==
Sarcinelli played professionally for just three clubs: São Cristóvão, São Paulo and Flamengo. In 1954, his name appeared on the list of 18 additional names sent by the then CBD and prepared by coach Zezé Moreira for that year's World Cup in case the 22 names registered for that world cup were replaced, as required by FIFA.

== Honours ==
São Paulo

- Torneio Triangular de Uberaba: 1954
- Trofeo Jarrito: 1955
- Small Club World Cup: 1955

Flamengo

- Taça dos Campeões Estaduais Rio-São Paulo: 1955

== Death ==
Sarcinelli died on 28 November 2006, in João Neiva, Espírito Santo, due to an intestinal infection. The AA Ferroviária stadium in João Neiva currently bears his name.
