= Artemio Reyes =

American boxer

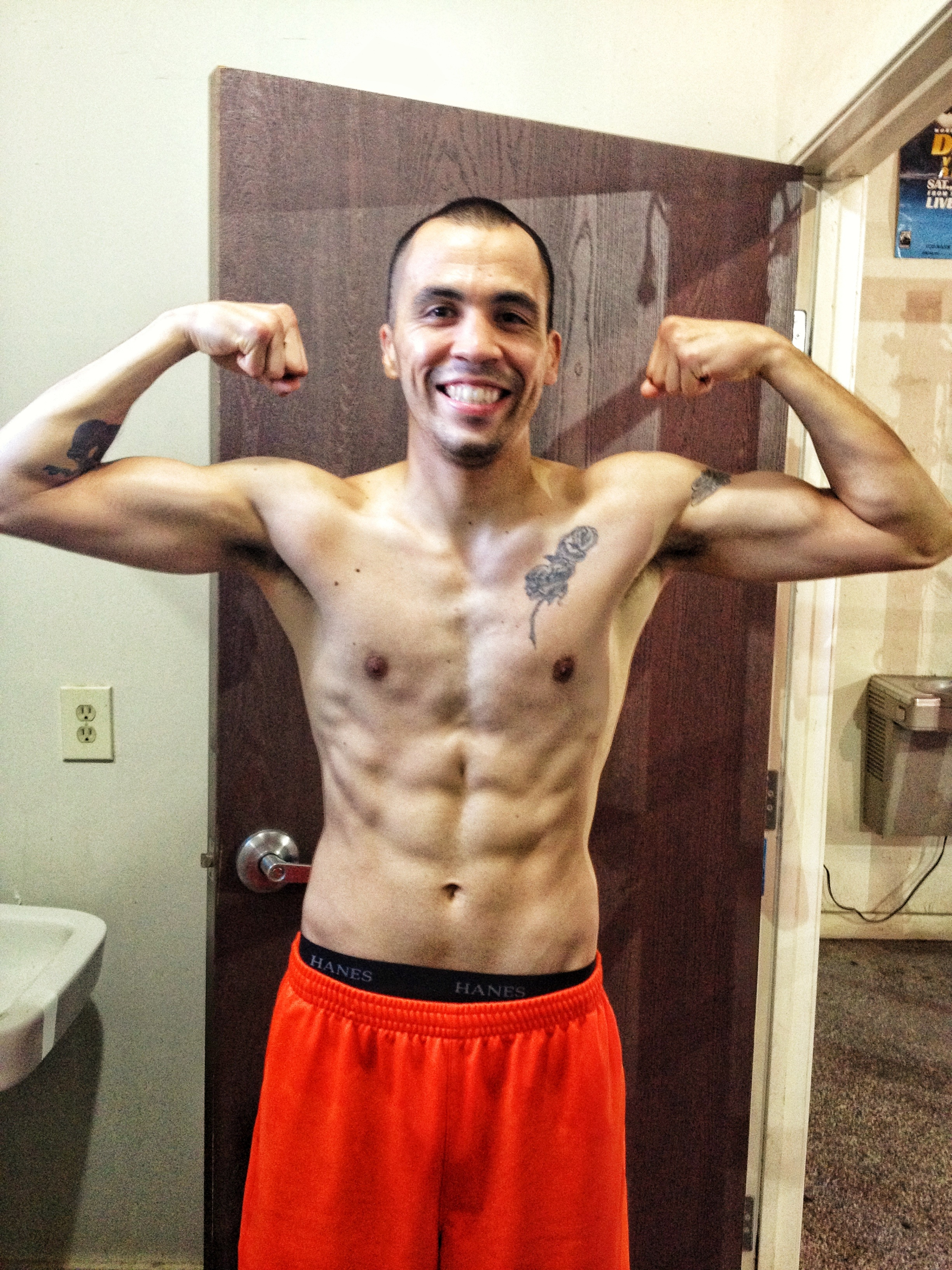
- Reyes after a workout

Personal information
- Nickname: King
- Born: September 22, 1986 (age 39) San Bernardino, California
- Height: 6 ft 0 in (183 cm)
- Weight: Welterweight

Boxing career
- Reach: 72 in (183 cm)
- Stance: Counterpuncher

Boxing record
- Total fights: 25
- Wins: 23
- Win by KO: 19
- Losses: 2
- Draws: 0
- No contests: 0

Artemio Reyes (born September 22, 1986) is an American professional boxer. He held the WBC FECARBOX welterweight title in 2012.

== Professional career ==
On October 28, 2011, Reyes upset undefeated prospect Javier Molina, this fight was the co main-event of a Showtime boxing card.
