= Salvador Sánchez II =

Mexican boxer (born 1985)

Salvador Sánchez
Personal information
- Nationality: (Mexico) Mexican
- Born: Salvador Sánchez Castro; 20 September 1985 (age 40) Santiago Tianguistenco, Mexico
- Height: 5 ft 8 in (173 cm)
- Weight: Featherweight

Boxing career
- Reach: 70 in (178 cm)
- Stance: Orthodox

Boxing record
- Total fights: 40
- Wins: 30
- Win by KO: 18
- Losses: 7
- Draws: 3
- No contests: 0

Salvador Sánchez Castro (born 20 September 1985) is a Mexican professional boxer and nephew of boxing legend Salvador Sánchez.

== Professional career ==
His first two fights were losses to undefeated boxers but has won 30 of his next 38 since then, winning the WBC CABOFE featherweight title in 2011. Salvador was signed to Bob Arum's Top Rank promotions.

== See also ==
- Notable boxing families
