= Professional boxing on the Gold Coast =

- Governing body: Australian National Boxing Federation

Professional boxing has taken place on the Gold Coast in Queensland, Australia since the 20th century and the city has developed the reputation as Australia's version of Las Vegas due to its entertainment options and most recently its ability to regularly host major professional boxing bouts that are televised internationally on broadcasting platforms such as DAZN and domestically on Foxtel as well as often drawing sellout in-person crowds.

== History ==
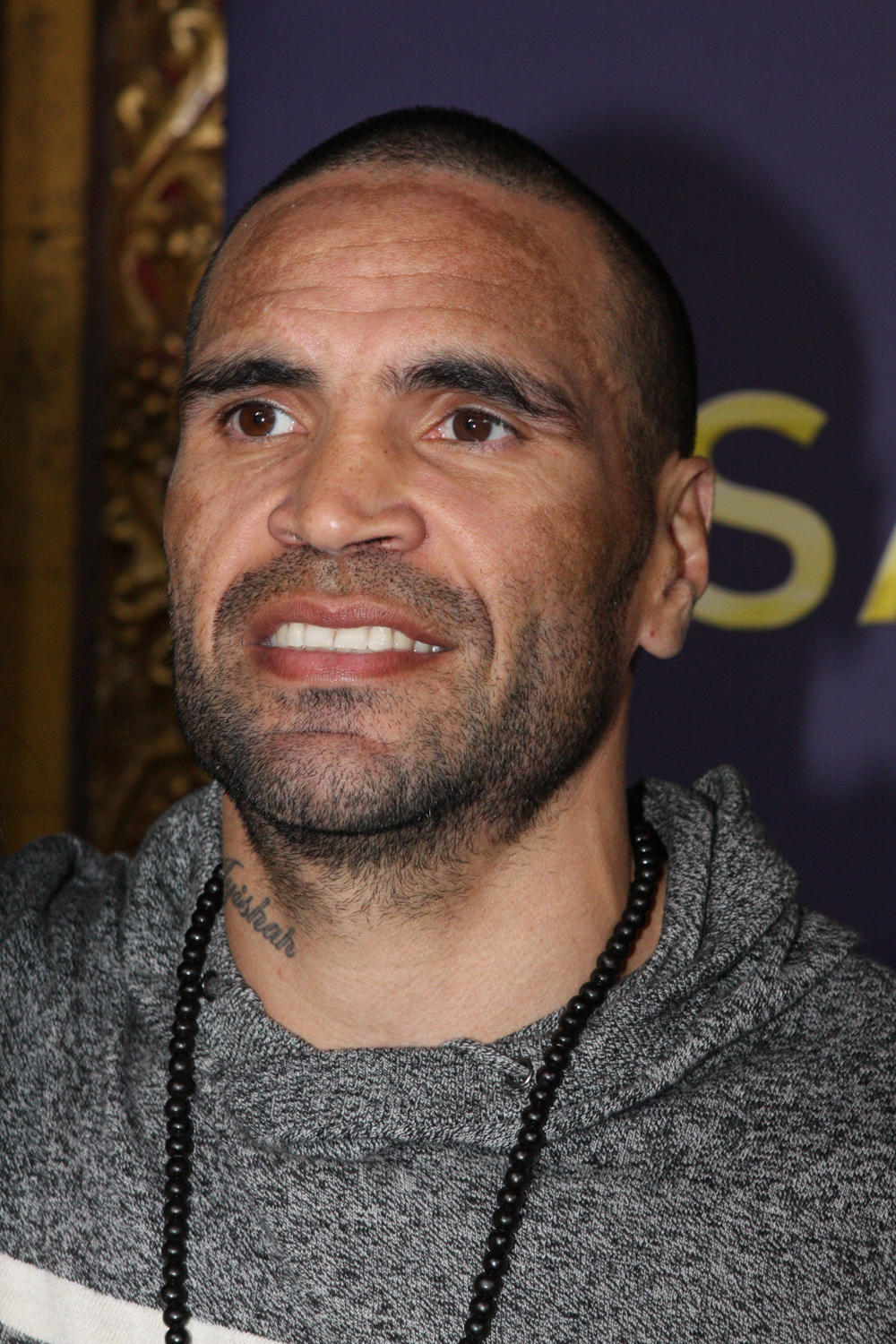
Australian boxer Anthony Mundine defended his WBA (regular) super middleweight world title on the Gold Coast in 2007.

Although professional boxing occurred on the Gold Coast on a small scale throughout most of the 20th century, it came to prominence in the 1990s when the first suitable indoor venue was built (Carrara Indoor Stadium) and British boxer Joe Bugner, who famously fought Muhammad Ali for the world heavyweight championship in 1975, permanently relocated to the Gold Coast and famously reinvented his image for his adopted nation as a beloved 'Aussie Joe' figure. Bugner fought in his new hometown of the Gold Coast several times in the 1990s and famously became the first boxer representing Australia to capture a world heavyweight championship at the age of 48 when he defeated American James 'Bonecrusher' Smith for the WBF heavyweight championship in front of a sold-out crowd at the Carrara Indoor Stadium in July 1998. In October 2005, Gold Coaster Sharon Anyos won the inaugural WBC female featherweight title when she defeated Argentinian Marcela Acuña by unanimous decision at the newly opened Gold Coast Convention and Exhibition Centre. Anthony Mundine was the first male boxer to fight for a major world title on the Gold Coast in June 2007 when he defeated Argentinian Pablo Daniel Zamora at the Gold Coast Convention and Exhibition Centre via unanimous decision to retain his WBA (regular) super-middleweight world title.

This is a city that's built for boxing.

— Nikita Tszyu commenting on the Gold Coast hosting his IBF world title eliminator against Ben Mahoney in August 2026.

In October 2021, it was revealed that No Limit Boxing co-owners Matt and George Rose were planning to transform the Gold Coast into Australia's boxing capital by hosting multiple major world title fights in the city every year. "We want to turn Gold Coast into the Vegas of Australia in terms of boxing – so when we stage our events, everyone gets super excited and wants to fly in for the weekend," said Rose. The ambition to turn the Gold Coast into Australia's premier boxing city were echoed by Matchroom Boxing promoter Eddie Hearn in December 2021. The Tasman Fighters promotion also showed interest in hosting future world title events on the Gold Coast.

Former undisputed light middleweight champion Jermell Charlo is scheduled to fight on the Gold Coast in December 2026.

In July 2022, Jai Opetaia overcame a broken jaw to defeat Latvian Mairis Briedis for the IBF and Ring cruiserweight world titles at the Gold Coast Convention and Exhibition Centre. In 2023, Tim Tszyu defended his WBO light middleweight title twice in front of sellout crowds at the Gold Coast Convention and Exhibition Centre with victories over Mexican Carlos Ocampo and American Brian Mendoza before Opetaia returned to defend his world titles three times on the Gold Coast in 2025 in front of sold-out crowds at the Gold Coast Convention and Exhibition Centre. When asked about his experience boxing in the city, Tim Tszyu said "I have had great experiences (fighting) here on the Gold Coast... It was unbelievable and I want to experience it again," and Opetaia expressed his satisfaction toward fighting on the Gold Coast following his world title fight against Claudio Squeo in 2025 when he said "I love fighting here." In August 2026, Nikita Tszyu fought Ben Mahoney in an IBF light-middleweight world title eliminator in front of a sellout crowd at the Gold Coast Convention and Exhibition Centre and the bout controversially ended in a split draw.

As of August 2026, no Australian boxer has ever lost a major world title fight that has been hosted on the Gold Coast. The city plans to build a 12,000 - 15,000 seat indoor Gold Coast Arena in order to host more boxing world title fights on a regular basis. The Gold Coast also regularly plays host to events that showcase emerging professional boxing talent at smaller venues such as the 2,500 capacity theatre at the Star Casino, which hosted a card headlined by upcoming heavyweight Teremoana Teremoana in August 2026, and the 1,000 capacity Events Centre at the Southport Sharks Sports Club.

On 4 November 2026, it was announced that the Gold Coast would host a historic triple-header boxing card at Cbus Super Stadium headlined by Australian Tim Tszyu fighting Cuban Erislandy Lara for the WBA middleweight title. The card will also include former undisputed champion American Jermell Charlo's return to the ring for the first time in more than three years when he takes on Australian Brock Jarvis and Russian Elnur Samedov will defend his WBA (Regular) super-featherweight title against Australian Liam Wilson. The event has been dubbed one of the biggest in Australian boxing history. In the lead up to the fight, Tszyu spoke about the good memories he had while defending his world titles on the Gold Coast in the past and that he pushed his management to schedule the Lara fight in the same city "I kept pushing the (No Limit) boys, Gold Coast, Gold Coast, Gold Coast." In November 2026, former undisputed light middleweight champion Jermell Charlo said he had done deep research into the Gold Coast and expressed elation towards fighting in the city in December 2026 - "I'm coming to Australia, the Gold Coast, baby. Oh, I'm excited!"

== Prominent local boxers ==
The Gold Coast has a long history of producing prominent local boxers who have held or challenged for world titles as well as boxers from elsewhere who have based themselves on the Gold Coast and had success on the international stage:

- Skye Nicolson - A two-weight world champion who currently holds the WBC female super bantamweight world championship and previously held the WBC female featherweight world title. She also captured the gold medal in the featherweight division at 2018 Commonwealth Games held on the Gold Coast. She was raised on the Gold Coast and began her boxing career at the Jamie Nicolson Memorial Gym in the Gold Coast's northern suburb of Yatala.
- Cherneka Johnson - A former undisputed female bantamweight world champion. She grew up on the Gold Coast where she began training at the Albert Boxing Club and currently trains on the Gold Coast in the southern suburb of Coolangatta.
- Che Kenneally - A former WBA female light heavyweight world champion. She grew up on the Gold Coast where she began training at the Albert Boxing Club and currently trains on the Gold Coast in the suburb of Burleigh Heads.
- Jai Opetaia - A two-time cruiserweight who has held the IBF world championship twice and current holds the The Ring world title. He moved to the Gold Coast as an adult to further his boxing career and currently trains on the Gold Coast at the Opetaia Boxing Club in the suburb of Burleigh Heads.
- Jason Moloney - Former WBO bantamweight world champion. He moved to the Gold Coast in his 20s and trains at the Undisputed Boxing Gym in Tweed Heads.
- Sharon Anyos - The inaugural WBC female featherweight champion. She moved to the Gold Coast in her teenage years and trained at the Force Martial Arts gym in Oxenford.
- Joe Bugner - A former WBF heavyweight world champion who famously fought Muhammad Ali and Joe Frazier during his career. He moved to the Gold Coast in the 1980s and trained at the Police Citizens Youth Club in the Gold Coast suburb of Broadbeach.
- Les Sherrington - A former WBF super middleweight world champion. He moved to the Gold Coast as a teenager and trained at the 350 Fitness gym in the suburb of Miami.
- Jacob Ng - Former top 5 IBF world ranked boxer in the lightweight division. Ng was born and raised on the Gold Coast where he trained at the Matrix Boxing Gym in Ashmore.
- Ben Mahoney - A top 10 IBF world ranked boxer in the junior middleweight division. He was born and raised on the Gold Coast where he currently trains at the Boonchu Gym in Burleigh Heads.
- Demsey McKean - Former top 10 WBO world ranked boxer in the heavyweight division. He moved to the Gold Coast in his late 20s and trains at the Matrix Boxing Gym in Ashmore.
- Jasmine Parr - An upcoming flyweight boxer who is the daughter of legendary 10-time kickboxing / muay thai champion and former Australian middleweight boxing champion John Wayne Parr. She was born and raised on the Gold Coast where she currently trains at the Boonchu Gym in Burleigh Heads.

== Notable boxing matches held on the Gold Coast ==
Date	Bout/s	Type	Round, time	Venue	Note/s
4 July 1998	(Australia) Joe Bugner def. (United States) James Smith	TKO	1	Carrara Indoor Stadium	Bugner captured the WBF heavyweight world title.
22 October 2005	(Australia) Sharon Anyos def. (Argentina) Marcela Acuña	UD	10	Gold Coast Convention and Exhibition Centre	Anyos won the inaugural WBC female featherweight title.
27 June 2007	(Australia) Anthony Mundine def. (Argentina) Pablo Daniel Zamora	UD	12	Gold Coast Convention and Exhibition Centre	Mundine retained WBA (Regular) super-middleweight title.
22 July 2022	(Australia) Jai Opetaia def. (Latvia) Mairis Briedis	UD	12	Gold Coast Convention and Exhibition Centre	Opetaia won the IBF and The Ring cruiserweight titles.
18 June 2023	(Australia) Tim Tszyu def. (Mexico) Carlos Ocampo	KO	1 (12), 1:28	Gold Coast Convention and Exhibition Centre	Tszyu retained WBO interim light middleweight title.
15 October 2023	(Australia) Tim Tszyu def. (United States) Brian Mendoza	UD	12	Gold Coast Convention and Exhibition Centre	Tszyu retained WBO light middleweight title.
8 January 2025	(Australia) Jai Opetaia def. (New Zealand) David Nyika	KO	4 (12), 2:17	Gold Coast Convention and Exhibition Centre	Opetaia retained the IBF and The Ring cruiserweight titles.
8 June 2025	(Australia) Jai Opetaia def. (Italy) Claudio Squeo	KO	4 (12), 0:36	Gold Coast Convention and Exhibition Centre	Opetaia retained the IBF and The Ring cruiserweight titles.
6 December 2025	(Australia) Jai Opetaia def. (Turkey) Huseyin Cinkara	KO	8 (12), 0:36	Gold Coast Convention and Exhibition Centre	Opetaia retained the IBF and The Ring cruiserweight titles.
26 August 2026	(Australia) Nikita Tszyu drew with (Australia) Ben Mahoney	SD	12	Gold Coast Convention and Exhibition Centre	The fight was scheduled to be an IBF light-middleweight world title eliminator.
13 December 2026	(Australia) Tim Tszyu vs. (Cuba) Erislandy Lara	-	(-)	Cbus Super Stadium	Tszyu vs. Lara for the WBA middleweight title.
13 December 2026	(United States) Jermell Charlo vs. (Australia) Brock Jarvis	-	(-)	Cbus Super Stadium	Former undisputed champion Charlo returns to the ring for the first time in over three years against upcoming Australian boxer Jarvis.
13 December 2026	(Russia) Elnur Samedov vs. (Australia) Liam Wilson	-	(-)	Cbus Super Stadium	Samedov vs. Wilson for the WBA (Regular) super-featherweight title.
