= Tim Tszyu vs. Erislandy Lara =

2026 boxing match

- Date: 13 December 2026
- Venue: Cbus Super Stadium, Gold Coast, Queensland, Australia
- Titles on the line: WBA middleweight title WBA (Regular) super-featherweight title

Tale of the tape
Boxer	Tim Tszyu	Erislandy Lara
Nickname	"The Phoenix"	"The American Dream"
Hometown	Sydney, New South Wales, Australia	Guantánamo, Cuba
Pre-fight record	23–3–0 (18 KO)	32–3–0 (19 KO)
Age	32 years, 1 month	43 years, 8 months
Height	5 ft 9 in (175 cm)	5 ft 9 in (175 cm)
Style	Orthodox	Southpaw
Recognition		WBA middleweight champion

Tim Tszyu vs. Erislandy Lara, is an upcoming professional boxing match for the WBA middleweight title. The event will take place 13 December 2026 at Cbus Super Stadium on the Gold Coast, Queensland, Australia.

== Background ==
On 4 November 2026, it was announced that the Gold Coast would host a historic triple-header boxing card at Cbus Super Stadium headlined by Australian Tim Tszyu fighting Cuban two-weight world champion Erislandy Lara for the WBA middleweight title. The card will also include former light middleweight undisputed champion Jermell Charlo's return to the ring for the first time in more than three years when he takes on Australian Brock Jarvis and Russian Elnur Samedov will defend his WBA (Regular) super-featherweight title against Australian Liam Wilson. The event has been dubbed one of the biggest in Australian boxing history. More card bouts were announced on 9 November 2026, which included exciting upcoming Australian boxers Callum Peters and Kirra Rushton.

In the lead up to the event, Tim Tszyu took a swipe at former rival and co-main eventer Jermell Charlo by referring to him as "little Charlo" due to the American fighting on Tszyu's undercard. Charlo responded to the comments days later by predicting a "greedy" Tszyu will be knocked out by Erislandy Lara in the main event and that he believed he should "become the face of Australian boxing because he [Tszyu] ain't doing a good job", before confirming that he would return to Australia to fight Tszyu in 2027 should both fighters be victorious in December 2026. A day later, Lara told reporters that he was determined to "expose" Tszyu in their main event fight and challenged him to live up to being "as great as his father was".

Tszyu promptly fired back at Charlo a day later by stating that Lara was a "10 times better fighter" than Charlo and reminding him that since Charlo had chosen to not fight him in the past that "maybe it’s time for you to wait your turn" this time around. No Limit Boxing confirmed in late November that tickets for several sections of the stadium had already sold out and the majority of the premium tickets for the event had been snapped up.

== Fight card ==
Confirmed bouts:

Weight Class		vs.		Result	Round	Notes
Middleweight	(Australia) Tim Tszyu	vs.	(Cuba) Erislandy Lara (c)			^{Note 1}
Middleweight	(United States) Jermell Charlo	vs.	(Australia) Brock Jarvis
Super featherweight	(Russia) Elnur Samedov (c)	vs.	(Australia) Liam Wilson			^{Note 2}
Light Heavyweight	(Australia) Kirra Rushton	vs.	(Dominican Republic) Sanderson Diaz
Middleweight	(Australia) Callum Peters	vs.	(Mexico) Saulo Saldivar

^Note 1 For WBA middleweight title
^Note 2 For WBA (Regular) super-featherweight title

== See also ==
- Professional boxing on the Gold Coast
