= Takeshi Inoue =

Takeshi Inoue may refer to:

- Takeshi Inoue (footballer) (井上 健, 1928 – 1992), Japanese footballer
- Takeshi Inoue (mixed martial artist) (井上 武, born 1980), Japanese mixed martial artist
- Takeshi Inoue, better known as Takeshi Rikio (born 1972), Japanese professional wrestler
- Takeshi Inoue (boxer) (井上岳志, born 1989), Japanese professional boxer
