= Dwight Ritchie =

Australian boxer (1992–2019)

Personal information
- Nickname: The Fighting Cowboy
- Born: Dwight Thomas Ritchie; 29 February 1992 Shepparton, Victoria, Australia
- Died: 9 November 2019 (aged 27) Keilor East, Victoria, Australia
- Weight: Light middleweight; Middleweight

Boxing career
- Stance: Orthodox

Boxing record
- Total fights: 25
- Wins: 19
- Win by KO: 2
- Losses: 2
- No contests: 4

Dwight Thomas Ritchie (29 February 1992 – 9 November 2019) was an Australian professional boxer. He held the Australian middleweight title from 2014 to 2015 and the IBF Youth junior middleweight title in 2017.

== Boxing career ==
Ritchie, nicknamed "The Fighting Cowboy", boxed professionally as a junior middleweight and middleweight for ten years between 2009 and 2019, compiling a professional record of 19–2 (two knockouts) and 4 no contests. Titles held by Ritchie during his career include the Victoria State middleweight title, the Australian middleweight title, the OPBF middleweight title, the WBF Asia Pacific middleweight title, the IBF Youth junior middleweight title and the IBF Australasian junior middleweight titles. In his last ring appearance on 14 August 2019, Ritchie lost his IBF Australasian title via ten-round unanimous decision to 14–0 Tim Tszyu at the ICC Exhibition Centre in Sydney, Australia.

== Professional boxing record ==
| 25 fights | 19 wins | 2 losses |
|---|---|---|
| By knockout | 2 | 0 |
| By decision | 17 | 2 |
| No contests | 4 | |

| No. | Result | Record | Opponent | Type | Round, time | Date | Location | Notes |
|---|---|---|---|---|---|---|---|---|
| 25 | Loss | 19–2 (4) | (Australia) Tim Tszyu | UD | 10 | 14 Aug 2019 | ICC Exhibition Centre, Sydney, Australia | Lost IBF Australasian junior middleweight title |
| 24 | Win | 19–1 (4) | (South Korea) Jung Hoon Yang | UD | 8 | 27 Apr 2019 | Whitehorse Club, Melbourne, Australia | |
| 23 | Win | 18–1 (4) | (Australia) Joel Camilleri | UD | 10 | 3 Aug 2018 | The Melbourne Pavilion, Melbourne, Australia | Won vacant IBF Australasian junior middleweight title |
| 22 | Win | 17–1 (4) | (Australia) Emmanuel Carlos | UD | 8 | 13 Apr 2018 | The Melbourne Pavilion, Melbourne, Australia | |
| 21 | Win | 16–1 (4) | (New Zealand) Shay Brock | UD | 10 | 8 Dec 2018 | The Melbourne Pavilion, Melbourne, Australia | Won vacant IBF Youth junior middleweight title |
| 20 | Win | 15–1 (4) | (Hungary) Peter Orlik | TKO | 2 (8) | 22 Apr 2017 | The Melbourne Pavilion, Melbourne, Australia | |
| 19 | Loss | 14–1 (4) | (Japan) Koki Tyson | UD | 12 | 23 Nov 2016 | Sumiyoshi SportsCenter, Osaka, Japan | Lost OPBF middleweight title |
| 18 | Win | 14–0 (4) | (Japan) Hikaru Nishida | UD | 12 | 7 Jun 2016 | Korakuen Hall, Tokyo, Japan | Won OPBF middleweight title |
| 17 | Win | 13–0 (4) | (Australia) Ryan Waters | UD | 10 | 21 Nov 2015 | Cronulla Sutherland Leagues Club, Sydney, Australia | Retained Australian middleweight title |
| 16 | Win | 12–0 (4) | (Australia) Mark Dalby | UD | 6 | 14 Aug 2015 | The Melbourne Pavilion, Melbourne, Australia | |
| 15 | Win | 11–0 (4) | (Republic of Ireland) Joe Rea | UD | 6 | 8 May 2015 | La Mirage Receptions & Convention Centre, Melbourne, Australia | |
| 14 | Win | 10–0 (4) | (Australia) Dean Mikelj | UD | 10 | 17 Oct 2014 | La Mirage Receptions & Convention Centre, Melbourne, Australia | Won vacant Australian middleweight title |
| 13 | Win | 9–0 (4) | (Australia) Dean Mikelj | MD | 8 | 21 May 2014 | Eatons Hill Hotel, Moreton Bay Region, Australia | |
| 12 | Win | 8–0 (4) | (France) Mohamed Labari | UD | 8 | 30 Aug 2013 | Club Italia, Melbourne, Australia | |
| 11 | Win | 7–0 (4) | (Thailand) Athit Praditphon | MD | 10 | 3 May 2013 | Grand Star Receptions, Melbourne, Australia | Won vacant WBF Asia Pacific middleweight title |
| 10 | Win | 6–0 (4) | (Thailand) Suwicha Ratidet | UD | 8 | 1 Mar 2013 | Grand Star Receptions, Melbourne, Australia | |
| 9 | Win | 5–0 (4) | (New Zealand) Jody Allen | TKO | 4 (6) | 30 Nov 2012 | Grand Star Receptions, Melbourne, Australia | |
| 8 | Win | 4–0 (4) | (Australia) Michael Hermann | UD | 6 | 18 May 2012 | The Melbourne Pavilion, Melbourne, Australia | |
| 7 | Win | 3–0 (4) | (Australia) Leroy Brown | UD | 8 | 22 Jul 2011 | Sunshine Roller Skating Centre, Melbourne, Australia | |
| 6 | Win | 2–0 (4) | (Australia) Ben Costello | UD | 8 | 18 Mar 2011 | Sunshine Roller Skating Club, Melbourne, Australia | Won vacant Victoria State middleweight title |
| 5 | Win | 1–0 (4) | (Thailand) Jakkirt Suwunnalirt | UD | 8 | 17 Apr 2010 | Yoogali Club, Griffith, Australia | |
| 4 | NC | 0–0 (4) | (Australia) Andy Colgrave | NC | 6 | 13 Nov 2009 | Veneto Club, Melbourne, Australia | Originally UD win for Ritchie, later ruled NC due to Ritchie being underage |
| 3 | NC | 0–0 (3) | (Australia) Tomas Vysokai | NC | 6 | 30 Oct 2009 | The Roundhouse, Sydney, Australia | Originally SD win for Ritchie, later ruled NC due to Ritchie being underage |
| 2 | NC | 0–0 (2) | (Australia) Geoff Frazer | NC | 4 | 25 Sep 2009 | Prestige Warehouse, Melbourne, Australia | Originally UD win for Ritchie, later ruled NC due to Ritchie being underage |
| 1 | NC | 0–0 (1) | (Australia) Wayne Martin | NC | 4 | 16 Jul 2009 | Melbourne Town Hall, Melbourne, Australia | Originally UD win for Ritchie, later ruled NC due to Ritchie being underage |

== Death ==
On 9 November 2019, during a sparring session with Michael Zerafa in preparation for Zerafa's rematch against Jeff Horn the following month in Australia, Ritchie took a body shot, retreated to his own corner and collapsed. Despite attempts to save him, he could not be revived and died. He was 27 years old and left behind a wife and three children.
