= Bryan Mendoza =

Bryan Mendoza may refer to:

- Bryan Mendoza (footballer, born 1993), Argentine football left back
- Bryan Mendoza (footballer, born 1997), Mexican football winger

== See also ==
- Brian Mendoza (born 1994), American boxer
