= Liam Wilson (boxer) =

Australian boxer (born 1996)

Personal information
- Nickname: Mr. Damage
- Nationality: Australian
- Born: 18 March 1996 (age 30) Redcliffe, Queensland, Australia
- Height: 1.76 m (5 ft 9 in)
- Weight: Super featherweight

Boxing career

Boxing record
- Total fights: 21
- Wins: 18
- Win by KO: 10
- Losses: 3

Liam Wilson (born 18 March 1996) is an Australian professional boxer. As of October 2026, he is world ranked #2 by the World Boxing Organization (WBO) and #5 by World Boxing Association (WBA) in the super featherweight division.

== Early life ==
Wilson was born in Redcliffe, Queensland and was raised in nearby Caboolture in the northern Greater Brisbane area. He began boxing at the age of 12 at the Caboolture Boxing Club.

== Professional career ==
Following an extensive 140-fight amateur boxing career, Wilson made his professional debut against Ricky Curline in June 2018 and came out victorious via unanimous decision. In February 2023, Wilson controversially lost a fight against WBO super featherweight champion Emanuel Navarrete after knocking down Navarette in the fourth round and the Mexican spat out his mouthguard to cause a prolonged count, before Navarette regathered and knocked out Wilson in the ninth round. In December 2026, Wilson is scheduled to face Russian Elnur Samedov for the WBA (Regular) super-featherweight title on the Tim Tszyu vs. Erislandy Lara undercard at Cbus Super Stadium on the Gold Coast.

== Professional boxing record ==
21 fights	18 wins	3 losses
By knockout	10	3
By decision	8	0

No.	Result	Record	Opponent	Type	Round, time	Date	Location	Notes
21	Win	18-3	Rodex Piala	TKO	4 (10)	15 Jan 2026	Brisbane Entertainment Centre, Brisbane, Australia	
20	Win	17-3	Jorge Santana	TKO	4 (10)	17 Sep 2025	Pat Rafter Arena, Brisbane, Australia	
