= Manny Pacquiao vs. Jeff Horn =

2017 boxing match

Battle of Brisbane
- Date: 2 July 2017
- Venue: Lang Park, Brisbane, Queensland, Australia
- Title(s) on the line: WBO and Lineal welterweight titles

Tale of the tape
| Boxer | Manny Pacquiao | Jeff Horn |
| Nickname | "Pac-Man" | "The Hornet" |
| Hometown | General Santos, South Cotabato, Philippines | Brisbane, Queensland, Australia |
| Purse | $10,000,000 | $500,000 |
| Pre-fight record | 59–6–2 (38 KO) | 16–0–1 (11 KO) |
| Age | 38 years, 6 months | 29 years, 4 months |
| Height | 5 ft 5 1/2 in (166 cm) | 5 ft 9 in (175 cm) |
| Weight | 145 3/4 lb (66 kg) | 146 1/4 lb (66 kg) |
| Style | Southpaw | Orthodox |
| Recognition | WBO; Welterweight Champion; TBRB; No. 1 Ranked Welterweight; The Ring; No. 4 Ranked Welterweight; 8-division world champion | WBO; No. 1 Ranked Welterweight |

Result
- Horn wins via 12-round unanimous decision (117–111, 115–113, 115–113)

Manny Pacquiao vs. Jeff Horn, billed as the Battle of Brisbane, was a professional boxing match for the WBO and Lineal welterweight championship. The event took place on 2 July 2017 at Suncorp Stadium in Brisbane, Queensland, Australia. Horn won the fight by controversial unanimous decision and claimed his first world title in boxing.

== Background ==
The bout was initially announced in January 2017. However, by the next month the fight was in doubt. Pacquiao decided to fight Amir Khan in the United Arab Emirates, but the fight fell through.

The fight was finalized in April 2017, with the city of Brisbane and the Queensland government financing it. Some in the media questioned the quality of the match-up.

On 1 June, it was reported that 40,000 tickets had been sold within over a month remaining until the fight.

It was reported that Horn would receive $500,000 from this fight and Pacquiao was guaranteed at least $10 million.

== Fight details ==
In front of 51,052, Pacquiao lost a hard fought fight via controversial unanimous decision when the three judges scored it 117–111, 115–113, 115–113 in favor of Horn. Many pundits, as well as many current and former boxers, believed Pacquiao had done enough to retain the WBO title. Pacquiao claimed Horn got away with numerous dirty tactics in the fight, using illegal blows including elbows and headbutts, causing him to be cut on three different occasions during the fight.

Although Horn was the aggressor and showed determination throughout the fight, it nearly came to an end in round 9 when Pacquiao took control and looked for the stoppage. Horn lasted the round and was told by referee Mark Nelson to show competitiveness or else he would stop the fight.

=== Official scorecards ===
| Judge | Fighter | 1 | 2 | 3 | 4 | 5 | 6 | 7 | 8 | 9 | 10 | 11 | 12 | Total |
|---|---|---|---|---|---|---|---|---|---|---|---|---|---|---|
| Waleska Roldan | Pacquiao | 9 | 9 | 10 | 9 | 9 | 9 | 9 | 10 | 10 | 9 | 9 | 9 | 111 |
| Waleska Roldan | Horn | 10 | 10 | 9 | 10 | 10 | 10 | 10 | 9 | 9 | 10 | 10 | 10 | 117 |
| Chris Flores | Pacquiao | 9 | 10 | 10 | 9 | 9 | 9 | 9 | 10 | 10 | 10 | 9 | 9 | 113 |
| Chris Flores | Horn | 10 | 9 | 9 | 10 | 10 | 10 | 10 | 9 | 9 | 9 | 10 | 10 | 115 |
| Ramon Cerdan | Pacquiao | 9 | 9 | 10 | 9 | 10 | 9 | 9 | 9 | 10 | 10 | 10 | 9 | 113 |
| Ramon Cerdan | Horn | 10 | 10 | 9 | 10 | 9 | 10 | 10 | 10 | 9 | 9 | 9 | 10 | 115 |

== Aftermath ==
Despite having lost 4 of his last 9 fights, Pacquiao said, “I’m professional. I respect the judges.”

Pacquiao stated he would activate the rematch clause and fight Horn again at the end of 2017. CompuBox stats showed that Pacquiao landed 182 out of 573 punches thrown (32%), whilst Horn landed 92 of 625 thrown (15%).

In regard to the controversial scorecards, ESPN's Dan Rafael scored the fight 117–111 and ESPN analyst Teddy Atlas scored it 116–111, both for Pacquiao. The Guardian and the International Business Times also scored the fight in favor of Pacquiao as well, 117–111. BoxingScene had it 116–112 for Pacquiao, while CBS Sports scored the fight 114–114 even. BoxNation's Steve Bunce scored the fight 115–113 for Horn. In total, 12 of 15 media outlets scored the bout for Pacquiao, 2 of 15 outlets ruled in favor of Horn and 1 scored a draw.

=== Reactions ===
Horn's upset win over Pacquiao was widely criticized by boxing analysts, sports journalists and fans alike, with many comparing the decision to that of the controversial Pacquiao vs. Timothy Bradley fight.

Post-fight stats showed that Pacquiao landed almost double the number of punches that Horn landed. Dieter Kurtenbach of Fox Sports described the fight as "rigged", and T. J. Quinn of ESPN commented, “No way in hell Horn won unanimously,” he tweeted. “A 117–111 card? Ridiculous. This is a hometown hit job. Manny looked old, but mostly in control".

Pacquiao's trainer Freddie Roach was disappointed in the results. “That was hard, sometimes I think people need to be investigated,” Roach commented, referring to the score of 117–111 from judge Waleska Roldan.

Pacquiao said after the fight that he plans to exercise his rematch clause and that he would return to Australia for that fight. Pacquiao, who stated that he respects the judges' decision, also said that he wants competent officials for the rematch. In August 2017, boxing promoter Bob Arum scheduled a rematch between Pacquiao and Horn in Brisbane that was likely to be set for November 2017. However, Pacquiao later stated that he couldn't fight Horn in November 2017, but would do so sometime in 2018.

=== Rescore by WBO ===
In response to a request from the Philippines Games and Amusements Board, the WBO agreed to rescore the fight between Pacquiao and Horn. It was scored round-by-round by five anonymous judges but the WBO stated that they do not have the power to reverse the original result of the fight. The WBO rescored the fight 115–113, 7 rounds to 5 in favour of Horn.

WBO's rescore:

Judge 1: 114–113 | Pacquiao
Judge 2: 114–114 | Draw
Judge 3: 113–115 | Horn
Judge 4: 113–114 | Horn
Judge 5: 113–114 | Horn

== Fight card ==
Confirmed bouts:

| Weight Class | | vs. | | Result | Round | Notes |
|---|---|---|---|---|---|---|
| Welterweight | (Australia) Jeff Horn | def. | (Philippines) Manny Pacquiao (c) | UD | 12 | ^{Note 1} |
| Super flyweight | (Philippines) Jerwin Ancajas (c) | def. | (Japan) Teiru Kinoshita | TKO | 7 | ^{Note 2} |
| Light heavyweight | (Australia) Damien Hooper | def. | (Russia) Umar Salamov (c) | UD | 10 | ^{Note 3} |
| Middleweight | (Australia) David Toussaint | def. | (United States) Shane Mosley Jr. | SD | 8 |
| Super lightweight | (Australia) Brent Dames | def. | (Philippines) Jonel Dapidran | UD | 6 | ^{Note 4} |
| Super bantamweight | (Republic of Ireland) Michael Conlan | def. | (Australia) Jarrett Owen | KO | 3 |
| Super bantamweight | (Australia) Brock Jarvis | def. | (Indonesia) Rasmanudin | KO | 1 | ^{Note 5} |

^Note 1 For WBO welterweight title
^Note 2 For IBF super flyweight title
^Note 3 For WBO International and vacant IBF light heavyweight International titles
^Note 4 Pre broadcast bout. Non-televised announced by Daniel Hennessey

== Broadcasting ==
The fight was broadcast as a pay-per-view (PPV) in the fighters' home countries of Australia and the Philippines, with the rights respectively held by Main Event and ABS-CBN's Sky PPV.

In the United States, the fight was acquired by ESPN; it marked a return of Top Rank boxing to the network, after having previously aired fights on ESPN from 1980 to 1996. It marked the first time that a Pacquiao bout would air on a non-premium, basic cable channel in the United States, and his first non-PPV bout in the U.S. since 2005. The event was a prelude to a long-term deal between ESPN and Top Rank, formally announced in August and replacing its former agreement with HBO (which discontinued boxing telecasts).

The ESPN broadcast achieved an average viewership of 2.812 million and a 1.6 Nielsen household rating, while ESPN reported an average audience of 3.1 million and a peak of 4.4 across both its English and Spanish-language broadcasts. ESPN stated that it was the most-watched boxing telecast in cable and ESPN history.

| Country | Broadcaster | | |
| Country | Free-to-air | Cable/pay television | PPV |
|---|---|---|---|
| Australia | —N/a | —N/a | Main Event |
| Brazil | RecordTV | SporTV | —N/a |
| Canada | —N/a | Super Channel | —N/a |
| Indonesia | tvOne | —N/a | —N/a |
| Mexico | TV Azteca | —N/a | —N/a |
| New Zealand | —N/a | —N/a | SKY Arena |
| Philippines | GMA Network; One Sports (2020) | —N/a | Sky PPV |
| Sub-Saharan Africa | —N/a | SuperSport | —N/a |
| United Kingdom | —N/a | BoxNation | —N/a |
| United States | —N/a | ESPN (English) | —N/a |
| United States | —N/a | ESPN Deportes (Spanish) | —N/a |

== See also ==
- Boxing in Australia
- Sport in Brisbane

| Preceded by vs. Jessie Vargas | Manny Pacquiao's bouts 2 July 2017 | Succeeded by vs. Lucas Matthysse |
| Preceded by vs. Ali Funeka | Jeff Horn's bouts 2 July 2017 | Succeeded by vs. Gary Corcoran |
