= Michael Zerafa =

Australian boxer (born 1992)

Personal information
- Nickname: Pretty Boy
- Nationality: Australian
- Born: 25 March 1992 (age 34) Melbourne, Victoria, Australia
- Height: 177 cm (5 ft 10 in)
- Weight: Light-middleweight; Middleweight

Boxing career
- Reach: 182 cm (72 in)
- Stance: Orthodox

Boxing record
- Total fights: 39
- Wins: 33
- Win by KO: 21
- Losses: 5
- No contests: 1

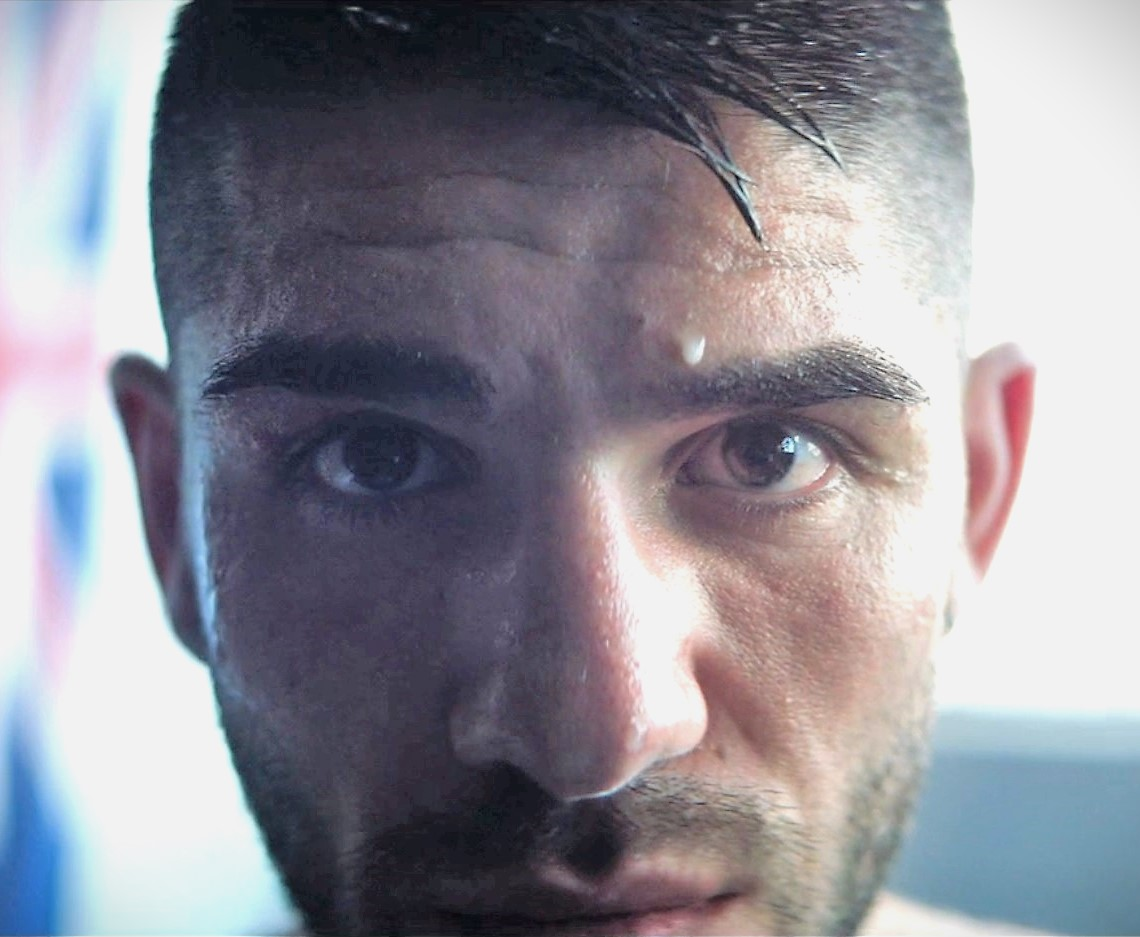
Michael Zerafa

Michael Zerafa (born 25 March 1992) is an Australian professional boxer. He held the Commonwealth light-middleweight title in 2018.

== Boxing career ==
Early in his career, he was the Victorian super-welterweight champion.

=== Zerafa vs. Magomedov ===
On 24 October 2014, he lost to Arif Magomedov in his first fight outside Australia when challenging for the WBO Youth and Asia Pacific middleweight titles.

=== Zerafa vs. Quillin ===
On 12 September 2015, he lost via knockout to Peter Quillin in his second fight outside Australia. The impact of the knockout caused him to leave the arena on a stretcher.

=== Zerafa vs. Kirima ===
On 22 April 2016, Zerafa defeated Yosuke Kirima for the IBF Pan Pacific middleweight title.

=== Zerafa vs. Harper ===
Zerafa faced Adam Harper for the vacant Commonwealth super-welterweight title at the Melbourne Pavilion in Flemington on 16 March 2018, winning by unanimous decision.

=== Zerafa vs. Brook ===
On 5 November 2018, it was announced Zerafa would face Kell Brook at the Sheffield Arena on 8 December 2018, in a WBA super-welterweight title eliminator. He lost the fight via unanimous decision.

=== Zerafa vs. Sherrington ===
On 12 April 2019, Zerafa returned home to Australia and defeated Les Sherrington via knockout.

=== Zerafa vs. Horn ===
He then defeated Jeff Horn for the WBA Oceania middleweight title in Bendigo on 31 August 2019, this time winning via technical knockout. Horn was ranked #3 by the WBA, #5 by the WBO and #14 by the IBF at middleweight at the time.

=== Zerafa vs. Ritchie ===
On 9 November 2019, Zerafa was sparring with Dwight Ritchie when Ritchie collapsed in between rounds after a hit to the chest. Ritchie could not be revived and later died.

=== Zerafa vs. Hardman ===
On 20 April 2022, Zerafa faced Isaac Hardman in an IBF title eliminator at Melbourne Convention and Exhibition Centre where Zerafa would knockout Hardman in the second round.

=== World title opportunity ===
Zerafa was originally slated to fight Esquiva Falcão for the vacant IBF middleweight world title. However, Zerafa opted to pursue a World Boxing Association title fight against Erislandy Lara, so Falcão is now slated to fight Vincenzo Gualtieri for the IBF title.

== Professional boxing record ==
38 fights	32 wins	5 losses
By knockout	20	2
By decision	12	3
No contests	1	

No.	Result	Record	Opponent	Type	Round, time	Date	Location	Notes
38	NC	32–5 (1)	Nikita Tszyu	TD	3 (10), 0:02	16 Jan 2026	Brisbane Entertainment Centre, Brisbane, Australia	For vacant WBO International middleweight title; Zerafa repeatedly reported to the doctor that he could not see. Based on these reports, the doctor advised that the fight be stopped, and the referee, following that advice, had no choice but to wave the fight off
37	Win	32–5	Tommy Browne	RTD	1 (8), 2:00	28 Aug 2024	ICC Sydney Theatre, Sydney, Australia	
36	Loss	31–5	Erislandy Lara	TKO	2 (12), 2:59	30 Mar 2024	T-Mobile Arena, Paradise, Nevada, U.S.	For WBA middleweight title
35	Win	31–4	Danilo Creati	UD	10	23 Nov 2022	Aware Super Theatre, Sydney, Australia	
34	Win	30–4	Issac Hardman	TKO	2 (12), 1:27	20 Apr 2022	Convention and Exhibition Centre, Melbourne, Australia	
33	Win	29–4	Siliveni Nawai	TKO	4 (10), 2:55	20 Dec 2021	Melbourne Pavilion, Melbourne, Australia	Retained WBA Oceania middleweight title
32	Win	28–4	Anthony Mundine	TKO	1 (10), 2:09	13 Mar 2021	Bendigo Stadium, Bendigo, Australia	Won vacant WBA Oceania middleweight title
31	Loss	27–4	Jeff Horn	MD	10	18 Dec 2019	Convention & Exhibition Centre, Brisbane, Australia	Lost WBA Oceania and WBO Oriental middleweight titles
30	Win	27–3	Jeff Horn	TKO	9 (10), 2:55	31 Aug 2019	Bendigo Stadium, Bendigo, Australia	Won WBA Oceania, WBO Oriental, and vacant IBF Asia Oceania middleweight titles
29	Win	26–3	Les Sherrington	KO	2 (8), 1:31	12 Apr 2019	Melbourne Pavilion, Melbourne, Australia	
28	Loss	25–3	Kell Brook	UD	12	8 Dec 2018	Sheffield Arena, Sheffield, England	
27	Win	25–2	José Agustín Julio	TKO	3 (10), 1:46	31 Aug 2018	Croatian Club, Melbourne, Australia	Retained WBA Oceania light middleweight title
26	Win	24–2	Wade Ryan	UD	10	1 Jun 2018	Melbourne Pavilion, Melbourne, Australia	Won vacant WBA Oceania light middleweight title
25	Win	23–2	Adam Harper	UD	12	16 Mar 2018	Melbourne Pavilion, Melbourne, Australia	Won vacant Commonwealth light middleweight title
24	Win	22–2	Tomás Andrés Reynoso	KO	6 (8), 2:58	17 Jun 2017	Melbourne Pavilion, Melbourne, Australia	
23	Win	21–2	Renato Oliveira	TKO	3 (10), 2:32	10 Dec 2016	Melbourne Park Function Centre, Melbourne, Australia	Retained IBF Pan Pacific middleweight title
22	Win	20–2	István Zeller	TKO	5 (10), 2:32	13 Aug 2016	Melbourne Park Function Centre, Melbourne, Australia	
21	Win	19–2	Yosuke Kirima	UD	12	22 Apr 2016	Melbourne Pavilion, Melbourne, Australia	Won vacant IBF Pan Pacific middleweight title
20	Win	18–2	Gustavo Alberto Sánchez	KO	4 (8)	6 Dec 2015	Melbourne Pavilion, Melbourne, Australia	
19	Loss	17–2	Peter Quillin	KO	5 (12), 1:06	12 Sep 2015	Foxwoods Resort Casino, Ledyard, Connecticut, US	
18	Win	17–1	Yuttana Wongda	TKO	4 (6), 0:49	27 Mar 2015	Malvern Town Hall, Melbourne, Australia	
17	Win	16–1	Bruno Carvalho	TKO	5 (6), 1:29	5 Dec 2014	La Mirage Reception & Convention Centre, Melbourne, Australia	
16	Loss	15–1	Arif Magomedov	UD	10	24 Oct 2014	Luzhniki Palace of Sports, Moscow, Russia	For vacant WBO Asia Pacific and WBO Youth middleweight titles
15	Win	15–0	Joe Rea	UD	8	27 Jun 2014	Malvern Town Hall, Melbourne, Australia	
14	Win	14–0	Luke Sharp	UD	8	27 Feb 2014	Eatons Hill Hotel, Brisbane, Australia	
13	Win	13–0	Athit Praditphon	TKO	8 (8)	13 Dec 2013	Club Italia Sporting Club, Melbourne, Australia	
12	Win	12–0	Amnat Daengphayap	KO	2 (8)	8 Nov 2013	Malvern Town Hall, Melbourne, Australia	
11	Win	11–0	Anton Olarte	UD	10	7 Jun 2013	Malvern Town Hall, Melbourne, Australia	
10	Win	10–0	Richard Kenneth Carr	TKO	3 (6), 0:27	19 Apr 2013	Moonee Valley Racecourse, Melbourne, Australia	
9	Win	9–0	Adrian Campbell	UD	10	21 Feb 2013	Melbourne Pavilion, Melbourne, Australia	Retained WBC-ABCO Continental light middleweight title
8	Win	8–0	David Galvin	UD	10	16 Nov 2012	Malvern Town Hall, Melbourne, Australia	Won vacant WBC-ABCO Continental light middleweight title
7	Win	7–0	Ariel Omongos	TKO	2 (8), 2:34	29 Jun 2012	Malvern Town Hall, Melbourne, Australia	
6	Win	6–0	Faisal Fayad	SD	8	11 Nov 2011	Malvern Town Hall, Melbourne, Australia	Won vacant ANBF Victoria State light middleweight title
5	Win	5–0	Xingxin Yang	TKO	4 (6), 1:03	26 Aug 2011	Coburg City Hall, Melbourne, Australia	
4	Win	4–0	Aswin Cabuy	UD	4	22 Jul 2011	Sunshine Roller Skating Centre, Melbourne, Australia	
3	Win	3–0	Jean Claude	TKO	1 (4), 0:45	8 Jul 2011	Malvern Town Hall, Melbourne, Australia	
2	Win	2–0	David Gall	UD	4	1 Apr 2011	Malvern Town Hall, Melbourne, Australia	
1	Win	1–0	Peter Makrypodis	KO	1 (4), 1:42	18 Mar 2011	Sunshine Roller Skating Centre, Melbourne, Australia	

== Personal life ==
His mother is from Australia and his father is from Malta.

Achievements
Preceded by Jeff Horn	WBO Oriental middleweight champion 31 August – 18 December 2019	Succeeded by Jeff Horn
