= Abass Baraou =

German boxer (born 1994)

Personal information
- Born: 28 October 1994 (age 31) Aalen, Germany
- Height: 5 ft 9 1/2 in (177 cm)
- Weight: Light middleweight

Boxing career
- Stance: Orthodox

Boxing record
- Total fights: 20
- Wins: 18
- Win by KO: 9
- Losses: 2
Medal record
Men's Amateur boxing
Representing Germany
World Championships
Bronze medal – third place	2017 Hamburg	Welterweight
European Championships
Gold medal – first place	2017 Kharkiv	Welterweight

Abass Baraou (born 28 October 1994) is a German-French professional boxer who has held the World Boxing Association (WBA) light-middleweight title from 2025 to 2026. As an amateur, he won a bronze medal at the 2017 World Championships and a gold at the 2017 European Championships, both while competing at welterweight.

== Early life ==
Baraou was born on 28 October 1994 in Aalen, Germany. Shortly after his birth, his family returned to their homeland of Togo, where he spent the first nine years of his life before moving back to Germany and settling in Oberhausen. Born to Togolese-French parents, Baraou holds both Togolese and French nationalities from his parents. When he was 13 years old, the energetic Baraou attended a trial boxing training session offered at a youth center near his apartment. Although he didn't like it all that much, thinking it was too boring, he was spotted by a trainer that saw him hit the punching bag and persuaded him to continue training with him.

He became the first German in seven years to win a gold medal at the continental stage when he took first place in the welterweight event at the 2017 European Championships in Ukraine, upsetting the favorite Pat McCormack in the final. Later that year at the World Championships in Hamburg he reached the semi-finals of the welterweight tournament, where he fell to two-time Olympic medalist Roniel Iglesias.

He was also a three-time national champion and a three-time winner of the prestigious Chemistry Cup.

=== Amateur results ===
- 2012 Youth National Championships in Cologne, Germany (welterweight)
  - Defeated Sandro Thalmann 22–10
  - Defeated Hasan Ozer AB2
  - Defeated Johannes Simsch 21–10 (gold)
- 2012 Brandenburg Youth Cup in Frankfurt, Germany (welterweight)
  - Defeated Adam Sakhnini (Sweden) 14–8
  - Defeated Michał Ostrowski (Poland) 18–8
  - Lost to Igor Kharitonov (Russia) 9–15 (silver)
- 2012 Youth World Championships in Yerevan, Armenia (welterweight)
  - Defeated Yurik Mikaelyan (Armenia) 22–14
  - Defeated Manjeet Singh (India) RSC2
  - Lost to Osman Aydin (Turkey) 9–14
- 2013 U-21 National Championships in Moers, Germany (welterweight)
  - Defeated Besir Ay 3–0
  - Defeated Jan Ualikhanov 3–0
  - Defeated Malek Ezzeldinne 3–0 (gold)
- 2014 Chemistry Cup in Halle, Germany (welterweight)
  - Defeated Slawa Kerber (Germany) 2–1
  - Defeated Michael Gunitzberger (Austria) 3–0
  - Defeated Stephen Donnelly (Republic of Ireland) 2–1
  - Defeated Liu Wei (China) 2–0 (gold)
- 2014 U-21 National Championships in Moers, Germany (welterweight)
  - Defeated Daniel Kornmeier TKO2
  - Defeated Hrach Movsisyan 2–1
  - Defeated Olcay Simsek 3–0 (gold)
- 2014 National Championships in Straubing, Germany (welterweight)
  - Defeated Darian Neumann TKO2
  - Defeated Harun Guler 3–0
  - Defeated Slawa Kerber 3–0 (gold)
- 2015 European Games in Baku, Azerbaijan (welterweight)
  - Defeated Andrei Hartsenko (Estonia) 3–0
  - Lost to Parviz Baghirov (Azerbaijan) 0–3
- 2015 Chemistry Cup in Halle, Germany (welterweight)
  - Defeated Viktor Agateljan (Czech Republic) 3–0
  - Defeated Igor Nesterov (Ukraine) 3–0
  - Lost to Byambyn Tüvshinbat (Mongolia) 1–2 (silver)
- 2015 National Championships in Straubing, Germany (welterweight)
  - Defeated Alan Unadzhev 3–0
  - Defeated Arthur Krischanowski TKO3
  - Defeated Slawa Kerber 3–0 (gold)
- 2016 Chemistry Cup in Halle, Germany (welterweight)
  - Defeated Byambyn Tüvshinbat (Mongolia) 3–0
  - Defeated Ilya Ochkin (Kazakhstan) 3–0
  - Defeated Andrey Zamkovoy (Russia) WO
  - Defeated Arajik Marutjan (Germany) WO (gold)
- 2016 Beogradski Pobednik in Belgrade, Serbia (welterweight)
  - Defeated Roberto Queiroz (Brazil) 2–1
  - Lost to Daniyar Eleusinov (Kazakhstan) 1–2 (silver)
- 2016 World Olympic Qualifying Tournament in Baku, Azerbaijan (welterweight)
  - Defeated Josh Nyika (New Zealand) KO
  - Defeated Eumir Marcial (Philippines) 2–1
  - Defeated Bahtiyor Mirzomukhammad (Tajikistan) 3–0
  - Lost to Imre Bacskai (Hungary) 0–3
- 2016 National Championships in Straubing, Germany (welterweight)
  - Defeated Olcay Simsek 3–0
  - Defeated Elah Al-Magamseh TKO3
  - Defeated Magomed Schachidov 3–0
  - Defeated Jonathan Zumbe 3–0 (gold)
- 2017 Chemistry Cup in Halle, Germany (welterweight)
  - Defeated Sergey Margaryan (Russia) UD
  - Defeated Xavier Kohlen (Netherlands) UD
  - Defeated Ablaikhan Zhussupov (Kazakhstan) MD (gold)
- 2017 Beogradski Pobednik in Belgrade, Serbia (welterweight)
  - Defeated Sion Yaxley (Wales) 5–0
  - Defeated Vasile Belous (MLD) RSCI3
  - Defeated Maulen Oskenbek (Kazakhstan) 5–0
  - Defeated Andrey Zamkovoy (Russia) WO (gold)
- 2017 European Championships in Kharkiv, Ukraine (welterweight)
  - Defeated Miroslav Kapuler (Israel) 4–1
  - Defeated Alexandros Tsanikidis (Greece) 4–1
  - Defeated Vincenzo Mangiacapre (Italy) 3–2
  - Defeated Vasile Belous (Moldova) 5–0
  - Defeated Pat McCormack (England) 4–1 (gold)
- 2017 World Championships in Hamburg, Germany (welterweight)
  - Defeated Juan Solano (Dominican Republic) 4–0
  - Defeated Byambyn Tüvshinbat (Mongolia) 5–0
  - Lost to Roniel Iglesias (Cuba) 1–4 (bronze)

== Professional career ==
Baraou made his professional debut under legendary trainer Ulli Wegner on 28 April 2018, defeating undefeated compatriot Artur Mueller via fourth-round technical knockout (TKO) at the Baden Arena in Offenburg. In his second fight he took the German BDB light-middleweight title from Denis Krieger (14–5–2, 9 KO) with a ten-round unanimous decision (UD) victory over the Moldovan-born fighter. As the final bell rang, Krieger spat at Baraou and insulted him in the post-fight interview. The Hanover crowd booed him as he offered the fans in attendance both middle fingers several times while exiting the venue. Four months later, on 6 October, Baraou retained his belt against Robert Maess (22–1, 20 KO), the man Krieger had originally beaten for the title in January. He knocked his opponent down with a powerful left in the second round, and even though Maess was saved by the bell, he retired in his corner to give Baraou the victory.

On 16 February 2019, less than ten months after his pro debut, he defeated Mexican former world champion Carlos Molina by unanimous decision after twelve rounds for the vacant WBC International light-middleweight title. In May he defeated former IBO world champion Ali Funeka in Frankfurt, stopping the 41-year-old veteran in the fifth round. He followed that up with his first fight abroad, a TKO victory over Egyptian prospect Abdelghani Saber (8–0–1, 8 KO) at the Caesars Palace in Dubai. After Baraou dropped him once in the first round, he floored him again with a body shot in the second that he was not able to get up from. One and a half months later he defended his WBC International title against John O'Donnell on the undercard of the Regis Prograis–Josh Taylor World Boxing Super Series super lightweight final at The O2 Arena in London. Baraou sent him to the canvas late in the sixth round, and continued his attack after O'Donnell got to his feet, prompting the referee to stop the fight with one second left in the period.

After a main event stoppage victory over Mexican rival Abraham Juarez in Hamburg in January 2020, Baraou moved to England to train under the tutelage of highly regarded coach Adam Booth.

Baraou lost his first fight as a professional when he was defeated via split decision against Jack Culcay at Havelstudios in Berlin on 28 August 2020.

He won the vacant European super-welterweight title with a majority decision victory over Sam Eggington at Telford International Centre in Telford, England, on 1 March 2024.

Baraou successfully defended the title by unanimous decision against Macaulay McGowan at Bolton Whites Hotel in Bolton, England, on 14 June 2024.

On 23 August 2025, he defeated WBA interim super-welterweight champion Yoenis Tellez via unanimous decision at Caribe Royale in Orlando, Florida, USA.

Having been elevated to full WBA super-welterweight champion when Terence Crawford was stripped off the title in September 2025, Baraou faced WBO title holder Xander Zayas in an unification bout at José Miguel Agrelot Coliseum in San Juan, Puerto Rico, on 31 January 2026, but lost by split decision with two of the ringside judges both scoring the fight 116-112 in favour of his opponent while the third had it for him by the same margin.

On 11 September 2026, Baraou defeated Giovani Santillan via majority decision at Frontwave Arena in Oceanside, California, United States, to win the vacant WBO Inter-Continental light-middleweight title.

== Professional boxing record ==
20 fights	18 wins	2 losses
By knockout	9	0
By decision	9	2

No.	Result	Record	Opponent	Type	Round, time	Date	Location	Notes
20	Win	18–2	Giovani Santillan	MD	10	11 Sep 2026	Frontwave Arena, Oceanside, California, U.S.	Won vacant WBO Inter-Continental light middleweight title
19	Loss	17–2	Xander Zayas	SD	12	31 Jan 2026	Coliseo Jose Miguel Agrelot, San Juan, Puerto Rico	Lost WBA light-middleweight title; For WBO light-middleweight title
18	Win	17–1	Yoenis Tellez	UD	12	23 Aug 2025	Caribe Royale, Orlando, Florida, U.S.	Won WBA interim light-middleweight title
17	Win	16–1	Macaulay McGowan	UD	12	14 Jun 2024	Bolton Whites Hotel, Bolton, England	Retained European light-middleweight title
16	Win	15–1	Sam Eggington	MD	12	1 Mar 2024	Telford International Centre, Telford, England	Won vacant European light-middleweight title
15	Win	14–1	Hugo Noriega	UD	8	8 Dec 2023	Caribe Royale, Orlando, Florida, U.S.	
14	Win	13–1	Ferenc Katona	TKO	3 (8), 0:25	31 Mar 2023	York Hall, London, England	
13	Win	12–1	Brian Damian Chaves	TKO	6 (10), 1:55	19 Mar 2022	Tempodrom, Berlin, Germany	Won vacant IBO Continental light-middleweight title
12	Win	11–1	Meriton Karaxha	UD	10	3 Dec 2021	Harzlandhalle, Ilsenburg, Germany	
11	Win	10–1	Jay Spencer	TKO	1 (8), 2:13	10 Sep 2021	Wörthersee Stadion, Klagenfurt, Austria	
10	Loss	9–1	Jack Culcay	SD	12	28 Aug 2020	Havelstudios, Berlin, Germany	
9	Win	9–0	Abraham Juarez	RTD	4 (10), 3:00	25 Jan 2020	Work Your Champ Arena, Hamburg, Germany	
8	Win	8–0	John O'Donnell	TKO	6 (10), 2:59	26 Oct 2019	The O2 Arena, London, England	Retained WBC International light-middleweight title
7	Win	7–0	Abdelghani Saber	TKO	2 (8), 2:01	13 Sep 2019	Caesars Palace, Dubai, United Arab Emirates	
6	Win	6–0	Ali Funeka	TKO	5 (10), 2:52	4 May 2019	Fraport Arena, Frankfurt, Germany	
5	Win	5–0	Carlos Molina	UD	12	16 Feb 2019	Conlog Arena, Koblenz, Germany	Won vacant WBC International light-middleweight title
4	Win	4–0	Sasha Yengoyan	UD	10	1 Dec 2018	Schwalbe Arena, Gummersbach, Germany	
3	Win	3–0	Robert Maess	RTD	2 (10), 3:00	6 Oct 2018	Wolfsburg, Germany	Retained German light-middleweight title
2	Win	2–0	Denis Krieger	UD	10	2 Jun 2018	Stadionsporthalle, Hanover, Germany	Won German light-middleweight title
1	Win	1–0	Artur Mueller	TKO	4 (6), 2:17	28 Apr 2018	Baden-Arena, Offenburg, Germany	

== See also ==
- List of male boxers
- List of world light-middleweight boxing champions

Sporting positions
Regional boxing titles
Preceded by Denis Krieger	German light-middleweight champion June 2, 2018 – 2019; Vacated	Vacant Title next held by Ali Celik
Vacant Title last held by JJ Metcalf	WBC International light-middleweight champion February 16, 2019 – 2020; Vacated	Vacant Title next held by Tursynbay Kulakhmet
Vacant Title last held by Stephen Danyo	IBO Continental light-middleweight champion March 19, 2022 – 2023; Vacated	Vacant Title next held by Sion Yaxley
Vacant Title last held by Milan Prat	European light-middleweight champion March 1, 2024 – August 23, 2025; Won world title	Vacant
World boxing titles
Preceded by Yoenis Tellez	WBA light-middleweight champion Interim title August 23 – September 13, 2025; Promoted	Vacant
Preceded by Terence Crawford; Stripped	WBA light-middleweight champion September 13, 2025 – January 31, 2026	Succeeded by Xander Zayas
