= Yoenis Tellez =

Cuban boxer (born 2000)

Personal information
- Nickname: El Bandolero ("The Bandit")
- Born: Yoenis Tellez Silega; 11 June 2000 (age 26) Santiago de Cuba, Cuba
- Height: 5 ft 10 in (178 cm)
- Weight: Light middleweight

Boxing career
- Reach: 73 in (185 cm)
- Stance: Orthodox

Boxing record
- Total fights: 13
- Wins: 12
- Win by KO: 8
- Losses: 1

Yoenis Tellez is a Cuban professional boxer. He held the WBA interim super-welterweight title in 2025.

== Amateur career ==
Tellez won national youth titles in 2017 and 2018. Telez defected from Cuba in 2020 to turn professional in Russia. After two fights there, he returned to Cuba before entering the United States in 2022 and joined Ronnie Shields' gym in Houston.

== Professional career ==
Tellez featured on the undercard of Terence Crawford vs Errol Spence where he faced Sergio Garcia. Tellez produced his best performance yet stopping the Spaniard in the third round.

Tellez was scheduled to face Johan Gonzalez at Caribe Royale Orlando, Orlando, Florida, on October 19, 2024. He won the fight via seventh-round technical knockout.

Tellez defeated Julian Williams by unanimous decision for the WBA interim super-welterweight title at Barclays Center in Brooklyn, New York, on March 1, 2025.

Back at the Caribe Royale Orlando, he lost the title in his first defense to Abass Baraou, going down to a unanimous decision defeat on August 23, 2025.

At the same venue on December 13, 2025, Tellez return to winning ways when his opponent, Kendo Castaneda, retired at the end of the fifth of their scheduled eight-round bout.

Tellez was scheduled to face Brian Mendoza on March 28, 2026, at MGM Grand Garden Arena in Las Vegas. He won by unanimous decision.

== Professional boxing record ==
13 fights	12 wins	1 loss
By knockout	8	0
By decision	4	1

No.	Result	Record	Opponent	Type	Round, time	Date	Location	Notes
13	Win	12–1	Brian Mendoza	UD	10	28 Mar 2026	MGM Grand Garden Arena, Paradise, Nevada, U.S.	
12	Win	11–1	Kendo Castaneda	RTD	5 (8), 3:00	13 Dec 2025	Caribe Royale Orlando, Orlando, Florida, U.S.	
11	Loss	10–1	Abass Baraou	UD	12	23 Aug 2025	Caribe Royale Orlando, Orlando, Florida, U.S.	Lost WBA interim light-middleweight title
10	Win	10–0	Julian Williams	UD	12	1 Mar 2025	Barclays Center, Brooklyn, New York, U.S.	Won vacant WBA interim super-welterweight title
9	Win	9–0	Johan Gonzalez	TKO	7 (10), 1:57	19 Oct 2024	Caribe Royale Orlando, Orlando, Florida, U.S.	Retained WBA Continental Latin America light-middleweight title
8	Win	8–0	Joseph Jackson	UD	10	26 Apr 2024	Caribe Royale Orlando, Orlando, Florida, U.S.	Retained WBA Continental Latin America light-middleweight title
7	Win	7–0	Livan Navarro	KO	10 (10), 1:21	15 Dec 2023	Caribe Royale Orlando, Orlando, Florida, U.S.	Won vacant WBA Continental Latin America light-middleweight title
6	Win	6–0	Sergio García	TKO	3 (10), 2:02	29 Jul 2023	T-Mobile Arena, Paradise, Nevada, U.S.	
5	Win	5–0	Cameron Krael	PTS	6	12 May 2023	Caribe Royale Orlando, Orlando, Florida, U.S.	
4	Win	4–0	Alberto Delgado	TKO	2 (4) 0:38	25 Feb 2023	Caribe Royale Orlando, Orlando, Florida, U.S.	
3	Win	3–0	Dario Guerrero-Meneses	TKO	3 (6) 0:27	5 Nov 2022	Armory, Minneapolis, Minnesota, U.S	
2	Win	2–0	Andrey Tomashchuk	TKO	3 (6), 0:27	31 Oct 2020	Red Arena, Krasnaya Polyana, Russia	
1	Win	1–0	Nikita Borisenkov	TKO	2 (4), 0:50	25 Jun 2020	Vegas City Hall, Krasnogorsk, Russia	

== See also ==
- List of male boxers

Sporting positions
Regional boxing titles
New title	WBA Continental Latin America light-middleweight champion December 15, 2023 – March 1, 2025; Won interim title	Vacant
World boxing titles
Vacant Title last held by Brian Castaño	WBA light-middleweight champion Interim title March 1, 2025 – August 23, 2025	Succeeded by Abass Baraou
