= 2017 AIBA World Boxing Championships – Welterweight =

Boxing competitions

Welterweight at the 2017 AIBA World Boxing Championships
- Venue: Alsterdorfer Sporthalle
- Location: Hamburg, Germany
- Dates: 26 August–2 September
- Competitors: 26 from 26 nations

Medalists
gold medal	Shakhram Giyasov	Uzbekistan
silver medal	Roniel Iglesias	Cuba
bronze medal	Ablaikhan Zhussupov	Kazakhstan
bronze medal	Abass Baraou	Germany

The Welterweight competition at the 2017 AIBA World Boxing Championships was held from 26 August to 2 September 2017.

== Draw ==
=== Final ===
Final
2 September
(Uzbekistan) Shakhram Giyasov	5
(Cuba) Roniel Iglesias	0

=== Top half ===
First round
26 August
(Zambia) Nkumbu Silungwe	0
(Ukraine) Ievgenii Barabanov	5
26 August
(Greece) Alexandros Tsanikidis	5
(Puerto Rico) Bryan Polaco	0
26 August
(Brazil) Jhonathan de Oliveira	0
(England) Pat McCormack	5
26 August
(Egypt) Walid Said	0
(Kazakhstan) Abilayhan Jusipov	5
26 August
(Moldova) Vasile Belous	2
(India) Manoj Kumar	3

Second round
28 August
(Uzbekistan) Shakhram Giyasov	5
(Ukraine) Ievgenii Barabanov	0
28 August
(Greece) Alexandros Tsanikidis	0
(England) Pat McCormack	5
28 August
(Italy) Vincenzo Mangiacapre	0
(Kazakhstan) Ablaikhan Zhussupov	4
28 August
(India) Manoj Kumar	1
(Venezuela) Gabriel Maestre	4

Quarterfinals
29 August
(Uzbekistan) Shakhram Giyasov	5
(England) Pat McCormack	0
29 August
(Kazakhstan) Ablaikhan Zhussupov	3
(Venezuela) Gabriel Maestre	1

Semifinals
1 September
(Uzbekistan) Shakhram Giyasov	4
(Kazakhstan) Ablaikhan Zhussupov	1

=== Bottom half ===
First round
26 August
(Poland) Damian Kiwior	0
(Mongolia) Byambyn Tüvshinbat	5
26 August
(South Korea) Lee Seung-hyeon	1
(Dominican Republic) Juan Solano	4
26 August
(Uganda) Muzamiru Kakande	0
(United States) Quinton Randall	5
26 August
(Mauritius) Merven Clair	0
(Russia) Sergei Sobylinskii	5
26 August
(Jordan) Zeyad Eashash	3
(Australia) Andrew Hunt	2

Second round
28 August
(Azerbaijan) Parviz Baghirov	1
(Mongolia) Byambyn Tüvshinbat	4
28 August
(Dominican Republic) Juan Solano	0
(Germany) Abass Baraou	4
28 August
(United States) Quinton Randall	3
(Russia) Sergei Sobylinskii	0
28 August
(Jordan) Zeyad Eashash	0
(Cuba) Roniel Iglesias	5

Quarterfinals
29 August
(Mongolia) Byambyn Tüvshinbat	0
(Germany) Abass Baraou	5
29 August
(United States) Quinton Randall	0
(Cuba) Roniel Iglesias	5

Semifinals
1 September
(Germany) Abass Baraou	1
(Cuba) Roniel Iglesias	4
