= Weljon Mindoro =

Filipino boxer (born 2000)

Personal information
- Nickname: Triggerman
- Nationality: Filipino
- Born: Weljon Sandag Mindoro; January 26, 2000 (age 26) Dumingag, Zamboanga del Sur, Philippines
- Height: 1.80 m (5 ft 11 in)
- Weight: Middleweight; Light middleweight

Boxing career
- Reach: 183 cm (72 in)
- Stance: Southpaw

Boxing record
- Total fights: 19
- Wins: 17
- Win by KO: 16
- Losses: 1
- Draws: 1
Medal record
Men's boxing
Representing the Philippines
SEA Games
Bronze medal – third place	2025 Thailand	Middleweight

Weljon Mindoro (born January 26, 2000) is a Filipino professional boxer in the middleweight division.

== Amateur career ==
Prior to going professional, Mindoro has competed in the Batang Pinoy and Palarong Pambansa.

The Association of Boxing Alliances in the Philippines has considered recruiting Mindoro for the 2025 SEA Games.

== Professional career ==
=== Early years ===
On April 13, 2019, Mindoro won his debut bout against journeyman compatriot Jerry Kalaw via 3rd round stoppage in Bacoor, Cavite. Mindoro would spend most of his early years fighting in the welterweight and light middleweight divisions before evolving into a middleweight on 2022, Mindoro would compose a praise-worthy record of 10 wins, 10 KOs and 0 losses before moving down to the light middleweight division to fight his career's biggest test against former WBO light middleweight title-challenger Takeshi Inoue in Inoue's first defense of his WBO Asia Pacific light middleweight title in the Okada Manila Grand Ballroom, Parañaque, their fight ended in a split draw.

=== Move up the ranks ===
After defeating journeyman Mao Tameda in the first round in his return to the middleweight division, Mindoro was scheduled to make his U.S. debut against Mexican veteran Mahonri Montes, however, the bout against Montes was scrapped and was replaced by former bare-knuckle fighter and experienced boxer Tyler Goodjohn on July 10, 2024, at ProBox TV Events Center in Plant City, Florida, Mindoro won via 2nd Round KO. Mindoro was announced to fight Puerto Rican former WBC FECARBOX titlist Marcos Osorio-Betancourt on November 9, 2024, at Osceola Heritage Park in Kissimmee, Florida. However, Osorio-Betancourt withdrew and Brazilian gatekeeper Lucas de Abreu stepped up as a replacement, Mindoro knocked Lucas de Abreu out with a petrifying right hand punch in the third round.

On November 10, 2024, Mindoro was already scheduled to fight the reigning IBF Pan Pacific middleweight champion and veteran Australian boxer Joel Camilleri in an exhibition bout on December 6, 2024, in Dubai, United Arab Emirates. Mindoro won the IBA Asian 65 kilograms belt via fourth-round TKO against Camilleri.

On August 29, 2026, Mindoro suffered the first defeat of his professional career against Carlos Ocampo at the USC Galen Center in Los Angeles, California, USA, losing by ninth-round technical knockout.

== Personal life ==
While Weljon Mindoro was born in Dumingag, Zamboanga del Sur, he fights out of Bacoor, Cavite professionally. He trains at MP Promotions's president Sean Gibbons's gym and promotion, the Knuckleheads Boxing Gym and Viva Promotions.

== Professional boxing record ==
19 fights	17 wins	1 loss
By knockout	16	1
By decision	1	0
Draws	1	

No.	Result	Record	Opponent	Type	Round, time	Date	Location	Notes
19	Loss	17–1–1	Carlos Ocampo	TKO	9 (10), 1:59	29 Aug 2026	USC Galen Center, Los Angeles, California, U.S.	
18	Win	17–0–1	Elias Espadas	UD	10	5 Jun 2026	College Park Center, Arlington, Texas, U.S.	
17	Win	16–0–1	Wellem Reyk	KO	2 (8)	21 Feb 2026	Mayor Vitaliano D. Agan Coliseum, Zamboanga City, Philippines	
16	Win	15–0–1	Dormedes Potes	RTD	3 (8), 3:00	15 Aug 2025	ProBox TV Events Center, Plant City, Florida, U.S.	
15	Win	14–0–1	Omar Munguía	KO	1 (8), 1:28	7 Jun 2025	Boeing Center at Tech Port, San Antonio, Texas, U.S.	
14	Win	13–0–1	Lucas de Abreu	KO	3 (8), 0:22	9 Nov 2024	Osceola Heritage Park, Kissimmee, Florida, U.S.	
13	Win	12–0–1	Tyler Goodjohn	KO	2 (8), 2:46	10 Jul 2024	ProBox TV Events Center, Plant City, Florida, U.S.	
12	Win	11–0–1	Mao Tameda	KO	1 (6), 2:10	28 Jul 2023	Rizal, Laguna, Philippines	
11	Draw	10–0–1	Takeshi Inoue	SD	12	13 May 2023	Okada Manila Hotel and Casino, Parañaque, Philippines	For WBO Asia Pacific light middleweight title
10	Win	10–0	Wellem Reyk	KO	3 (10), 1:34	12 Jan 2023	Sablayan Astrodome, Sablayan, Philippines	
9	Win	9–0	Junjesie Ibgos	TKO	1 (8), 2:23	23 Oct 2022	Elorde Sports Complex, Parañaque, Philippines	
8	Win	8–0	Jason Egera	TKO	6 (10), 0:43	5 Aug 2022	Yñares Sports Arena, Pasig, Philippines	
7	Win	7–0	Jerwin Mejes	KO	1 (8), 0:43	9 Apr 2022	Rizal, Laguna, Philippines	
6	Win	6–0	Michael Escobia	RTD	2 (8), 3:00	5 Mar 2020	Quibors Boxing Gym, Bacoor, Philippines	
5	Win	5–0	Lyndon Castillo	KO	1 (4), 1:53	21 Dec 2019	Manila Arena, Manila, Philippines	
4	Win	4–0	Jonel Borbon	KO	2 (6), 1:36	15 Nov 2019	Mamburao, Occidental Mindoro, Philippines	
3	Win	3–0	Menard Abila	TKO	2 (6), 2:38	20 Sep 2019	Mandaluyong City Hall Grounds, Mandaluyong, Philippines	
2	Win	2–0	Janie Canoy	TKO	2 (4), 1:33	20 Jul 2019	Quibors Boxing Gym, Bacoor, Philippines	
1	Win	1–0	Jerry Kalaw	TKO	3 (4), 2:58	13 Apr 2019	Quibors Boxing Gym, Bacoor, Philippines	

== IBA professional boxing record ==
1 fight	1 win	0 losses
By knockout	1	0

No.	Result	Record	Opponent	Type	Round, time	Date	Location	Notes
1	Win	1–0	Joel Camilleri	TKO	4 (8), 1:40	6 Dec 2024	Agenda Arena, Dubai, United Arab Emirates	Won inaugural IBA Asian middleweight title
