= Adam Harper (boxer) =

English boxer (born 1988)

Personal information
- Nickname: Hurricane
- Born: 15 May 1988 (age 38) Bath, Somerset, England
- Height: 5 ft 9 in (175 cm)
- Weight: Super-welterweight

Boxing career
- Stance: Orthodox

Boxing record
- Total fights: 11
- Wins: 9
- Losses: 2

Adam Harper (born 15 May 1988) is an English former professional boxer. He was English super-welterweight champion in 2018 and also challenged for the Commonwealth title in the same weight division.

== Career ==
A professional boxer since 2014, Harper won the vacant Midlands Area super-welterweight title by defeating Ryan Kelly on points 97–95 at the Utilita Arena in Birmingham on 13 May 2017.

In his next outing he faced Michael Zerafa for the vacant Commonwealth super-welterweight title at the Melbourne Pavilion in Flemington, Australia, on 16 March 2018, losing by unanimous decision.

Harper got back to winning ways in his next fight, claiming the vacant English super-welterweight title thanks to a majority decision win over Billy Bird at the Brentwood Centre in Brentwood, Essex, on 21 September 2018. Two of the ringside judges scored the contest 97–93 and 96–95 respectively in his favour, while the third had it a 95–95 draw.

In April 2019, he announced his retirement from professional boxing after failing a mandatory brain scan. However, he reversed his decision a year later having regained his boxing license following further in-depth medical testing.

Harper made his comeback against Anthony Fowler at Matchroom Sport Headquarters Garden in Essex on 7 August 2020. He was knocked to the canvas in the fourth round but recovered to continue the fight, eventually losing by stoppage in the seventh round.

That proved to be Harper's final bout as he returned to retirement, although he remained involved in the sport, and in September 2024 gained manager and match-maker licences.

== Professional boxing record ==
11 fights	9 wins	2 losses
By knockout	0	1
By decision	9	1

No.	Result	Record	Opponent	Type	Round, time	Date	Location	Notes
11	Loss	9–2	Anthony Fowler	TKO	7 (10), 1:34	7 Aug 2020	Matchroom Sport Headquarters Garden, Brentwood, Essex, England	
10	Win	9–1	Billy Bird	MD	10	21 Sep 2018	Brentwood Centre, Brentwood, Essex, England	Won vacant English super-welterweight title
9	Loss	8–1	Michael Zerafa	UD	12	16 Mar 2018	Melbourne Pavilion, Flemington, Victoria, Australia	For vacant Commonwealth super-welterweight title
8	Win	8–0	Ryan Kelly	PTS	10	13 May 2017	Utilita Arena, Birmingham, England	Won vacant Midlands Area super-welterweight title
7	Win	7–0	Sergei Melis	PTS	8	10 Dec 2016	Tewkesbury School, Tewkesbury, England	
6	Win	6–0	Andrej Cepur	PTS	4	2 Sep 2016	Bescot Stadium, Walsall, England	
5	Win	5–0	Deividas Sajauka	PTS	8	23 Jul 2016	Tewkesbury School, Tewkesbury, England	
4	Win	4–0	Lewis van Poetsch	PTS	8	20 Nov 2015	Hatherley Manor Hotel, Cheltenham, England	
3	Win	3–0	Baltazaras Bajorunas	PTS	6	12 Sep 2015	GL1 Leisure Centre, Gloucester, England	
2	Win	2–0	Dmitrijs Ovsjannikovs	PTS	6	18 Apr 2015	GL1 Leisure Centre, Gloucester, England	
1	Win	1–0	Edgars Sniedze	PTS	4	24 Oct 2014	Hatherley Manor Hotel, Cheltenham, England	
