= Takeshi Inoue (boxer) =

Japanese boxer

Personal information
- Born: 井上岳志; 1 December 1989 (age 36) Tokyo, Japan
- Height: 1.72 m (5 ft 8 in)
- Weight: Welterweight; Light Middleweight

Boxing career
- Reach: 173 cm (68 in)
- Stance: Orthodox

Boxing record
- Total fights: 25
- Wins: 20
- Win by KO: 12
- Losses: 2
- Draws: 3

Takeshi Inoue (Japanese:井上岳志, Inoue Takeshi) (born December 1, 1989) is a two-time OPBF Super Welterweight Champion and former WBO Super Welterweight title challenger.

== Professional career ==
=== Japanese Boxing Commission Super Welterweight Championship ===
After nine consecutive wins for Takeshi Inoue, he got a title shot for the vacant Japanese Boxing Commission Super Welterweight title against a more experienced Koshinmaru Saito at Korakuen Hall, in the seventh round Takeshi Inoue knocked Saito down and Saito didn't get to escape the ten-second count, Leading to Takeshi Inoue to be the new Japanese Boxing Commission Super Welterweight Champion.

On August 10, 2017, nearly four months after Inoue won the title, he the then undefeated, Riku Nagahama, where he is making a title defense where he won in the eighth round via TKO.

=== OPBF and WBO Asia Pacific Super Welterweight Championship ===
On November 10, 2017, after defending his Japanese Boxing Commission Super Welterweight title, Inoue took the then OPBF Super Welterweight champion Thai boxer, Niwat Kongkan, for not only the OPBF title, but also for the WBO Asia Pacific Super Welterweight title, where Inoue won via eighth-round TKO, just when the round was about to end.

=== World Championship ===
On January 26, 2019, Inoue finally got a shot at a world title, specifically the WBO Super Welterweight title against the unbeaten Mexican boxer, Jaime Munguía where Inoue fell short in a unanimous decision loss, giving Takeshi Inoue his first ever loss.

=== Regaining WBO Asia Pacific title ===
After losing to Jaime Munguía, Inoue made a comeback against the Thai, Komsan Polsan, to try and get the WBO Asia Pacific Super Welterweight title back, which was vacant before the fight, The match ended fast, with Inoue winning via second-round KO.

After winning a non-title match after his fight against Komsan Polsan, Inoue was to face the Hard-hitting southpaw Chinese boxer, Cheng Su for the WBO Asia Pacific title, where the match went to a second-round RTD win for Inoue.

=== Takeshi Inoue vs Tim Tszyu ===
On November 17, 2021, after Takeshi Inoue not fighting for a year, he fought the unbeaten, hard-hitting Tim Tszyu for the WBO Global (Tszyu's title) and WBO Asia Pacific (Inoue's title) Super Welterweight titles unification bout at Tszyu's home country, Australia, after 12 rounds, Tszyu proved to be too much for Inoue where he won via lopsided decision, with the scores of 120-107(x2) and 119-108 all for Tszyu.

=== Earning back past Championship titles ===
Back on November 10, 2017, Inoue won the OPBF and WBO Asia Pacific Super Welterweight titles, on November 5, 2022, he was given a chance to take those titles (Vacant titles) back together, after nearly five years after earning them the first time, against fellow Japanese boxer, Ryosuke Tenyu Maruki, where he won the match via TKO in the sixth round.

After earning the titles, Takeshi Inoue defended the WBO Asia Pacific Super Welterweight against hard-hitting Filipino boxer, Weljon Mindoro, where the fight ended in a rather controversial split draw.

== Professional boxing record ==
25 fights	20 wins	2 losses
By knockout	12	0
By decision	8	2
Draws	3	

No.	Result	Record	Opponent	Type	Round, Time	Date	Location	Notes
25	Draw	20–2–3	Wade Ryan	MD	12	18 Mar 2024	Korakuen Hall, Tokyo, Japan	Retained OPBF and WBO Asia Pacific super welterweight titles
24	Win	20–2–2	Saenganan Sithsaithong	TKO	6 (12) 2:02	12 Oct 2023	Ariake Arena, Koto-Ku, Japan	Retained WBO Asia Pacific super welterweight title
23	Draw	19–2–2	Weljon Mindoro	SD	12	13 May 2023	Okada Manila Hotel and Casino, Parañaque City, Philippines	Retained WBO Asia Pacific super welterweight title
22	Win	19–2–1	Ryosuke Tenyu Maruki	TKO	6 (12) 2:31	5 Nov 2022	Korakuen Hall, Tokyo, Japan	Won vacant OPBF and WBO Asia Pacific super welterweight titles
21	Win	18–2–1	Nath Nwachukwu	UD	10	4 Jun 2022	Korakuen Hall, Tokyo, Japan	
20	Loss	17–2–1	Tim Tszyu	UD	12	17 Nov 2021	Qudos Bank Arena, Sydney Olympic Park, Australia	Lost WBO Asia Pacific super welterweight title; For WBO Global super welterweight title
19	Win	17–1–1	Nath Nwachukwu	UD	8	7 Nov 2020	Korakuen Hall, Tokyo, Japan	
18	Win	16–1–1	Cheng Su	RTD	2 (12)	18 Jan 2020	Korakuen Hall, Tokyo, Japan	Retained WBO Asia Pacific super welterweight title
17	Win	15–1–1	Nicole Paradorn Gym	TKO	1 (10) 1:39	19 Oct 2019	M.U Den Boxing Group, Bangkok, Thailand	
16	Win	14–1–1	Patomsuk Pathompothong	KO	2 (12) 2:24	3 Aug 2019	Korakuen Hall, Tokyo, Japan	Won vacant WBO Asia Pacific super welterweight title
15	Loss	13–1–1	Jaime Munguía	UD	12	26 Jan 2019	Toyota Center, Houston, U.S.	For WBO super welterweight title
14	Win	13–0–1	Yuki Nonaka	UD	12	26 Apr 2018	Korakuen Hall, Tokyo, Japan	
13	Win	12–0–1	Niwat Kongkan	TKO	8 (12) 2:51	10 Nov 2017	Korakuen Hall, Tokyo, Japan	Won OPBF and vacant WBO Asia Pacific super welterweight titles
12	Win	11–0–1	Riku Nagahama	TKO	8 (10) 1:52	10 Aug 2017	Korakuen Hall, Tokyo, Japan	Retained Japanese super welterweight title
11	Win	10–0–1	Koshinmaru Saito	TKO	7 (10) 1:10	25 Apr 2017	Korakuen Hall, Tokyo, Japan	Won vacant Japanese super welterweight title
10	Win	9–0–1	Akinori Watanabe	UD	8	14 Jan 2017	Korakuen Hall, Tokyo, Japan	
9	Win	8–0–1	Chan Ho Lee	RTD	2 (8)	11 Nov 2916	Korakuen Hall, Tokyo, Japan	
8	Win	7–0–1	Fahsanghan Por Lasuor	TKO	3 (8) 0:34	4 Sep 2016	Meenayothin Camp, Bangkok, Thailand	
7	Win	6–0–1	Elfelos Vega	UD	8	22 Apr 2016	Korakuen Hall, Tokyo, Japan	
6	Win	5–0–1	Hideo Mikan	UD	8	13 Nov 2015	Korakuen Hall, Tokyo, Japan	
5	Win	4–0–1	Hisao Narita	SD	8	30 Jul 2015	Korakuen Hall, Tokyo, Japan	
4	Win	3–0–1	Seksan Choochit	KO	2 (8) 0:42	16 Apr 2015	Korakuen Hall, Tokyo, Japan	
3	Win	2–0–1	Kota Oguchi	UD	6	19 Feb 2015	Korakuen Hall, Tokyo, Japan	
2	Win	1–0–1	Samson Sor Meter	KO	3 (6) 1:18	14 Nov 2914	Korakuen Hall, Tokyo, Japan	
1	Draw	0–0–1	Daishi Nagata	MD	6	2 Aug 2014	Adachi Ward Sogo Sports Center, Tokyo, Japan	
