= Jeff Horn =

Australian boxer

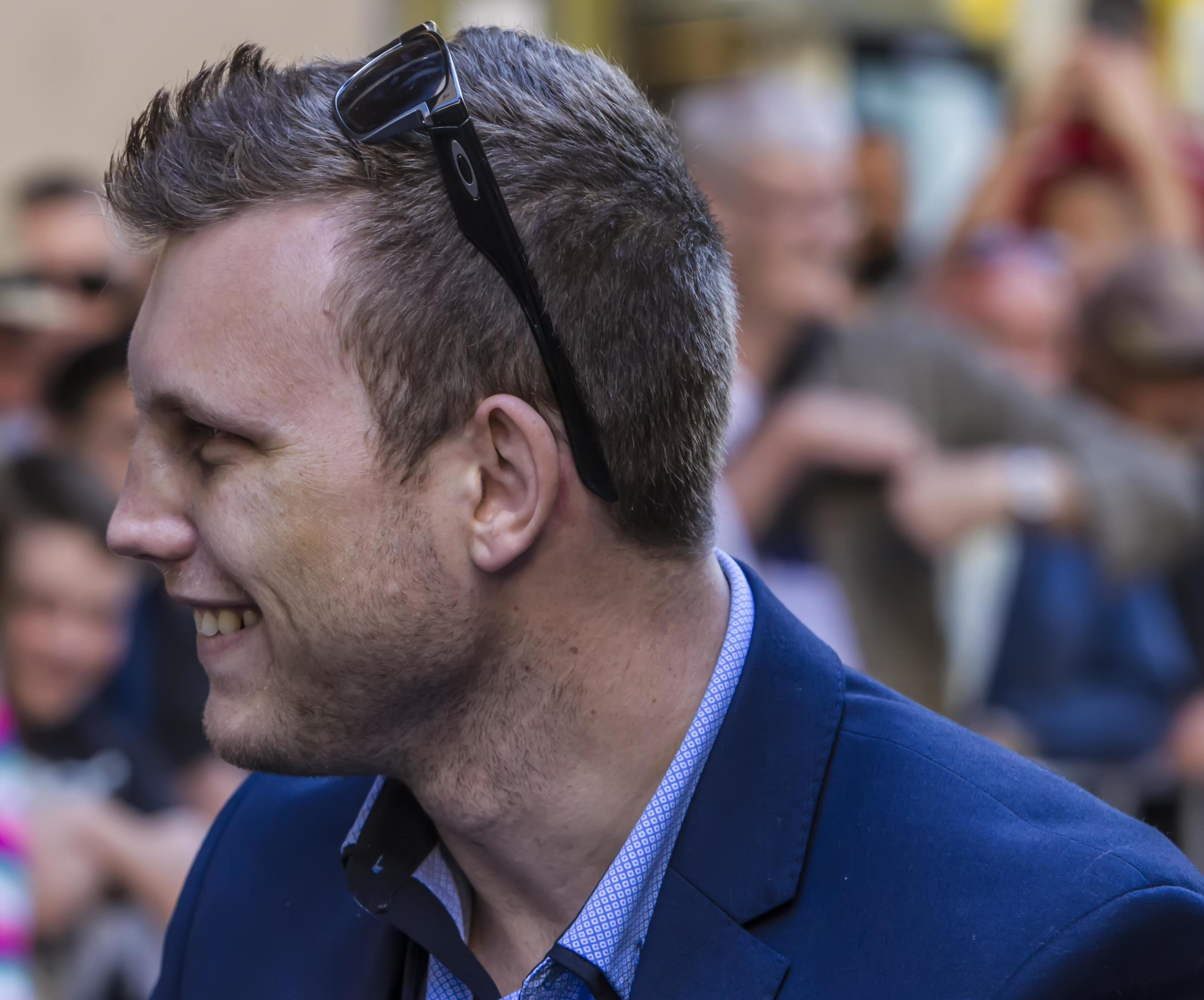
- Horn in 2017

Personal information
- Nicknames: The Hornet; The Fighting Schoolteacher
- Born: 4 February 1988 (age 38) Brisbane, Queensland, Australia
- Height: 5 ft 9 in (175 cm)
- Weight: Welterweight; Light Middleweight; Middleweight

Boxing career
- Reach: 69 1/2 in (177 cm)
- Stance: Orthodox

Boxing record
- Total fights: 24
- Wins: 20
- Win by KO: 13
- Losses: 3
- Draws: 1
Medal record
Men's amateur boxing
Representing Australia
Arafura Games
Gold medal – first place	2011 Darwin	Light-welterweight

Jeffrey Christopher Horn Jr. (born 4 February 1988) is an Australian former professional boxer who competed from 2013 to 2020. He held the WBO welterweight title from 2017 to 2018. As an amateur, he represented Australia at the 2012 Olympics, reaching the quarterfinals of the light-welterweight bracket.

== Amateur career ==
As a relative latecomer to the sport, Horn won his first Australian title in 2009 and repeated the feat in 2011. He went on to win a silver medal at the Gee-Bee Tournament in Helsinki and compete at the 2011 AIBA World Boxing Championships in Baku where he lost to eventual champion Everton Lopes in the second round. In 2012, he picked up his third Australian title and first Oceania title to earn a spot at the London Olympics.

=== 2012 London Olympics ===
==== Results ====
Men's light-welterweight (64 kg)

1. Round of 32 (first match): defeated Gilbert Choombe, Zambia (5)
2. Round of 16 (second match): defeated Abderrazak Houya, Tunisia (11)
3. Quarterfinals (third match): lost to Denys Berinchyk, Ukraine (21)

== Professional career ==
=== Early career ===
Horn made his professional debut in Melbourne on 1 March 2013, winning by second-round technical knockout. In just his seventh pro bout he outpointed two-time world title challenger and former IBF #1 contender Naoufel Ben Rabah. On 27 April 2016, Horn faced former two-division world champion Randall Bailey. After dropping Bailey in the second round, Horn was knocked down in the third round. Horn won by TKO after Bailey refused to get up from his corner before round eight. On 21 October 2016, Horn fought Rico Mueller and defeated the German by TKO in round nine. After the fight, the WBO ranked him the #2 welterweight in the world. On 10 December 2016, Horn faced former IBO welterweight champion Ali Funeka, whom he stopped in the sixth round. With Top Rank promoter Bob Arum in attendance, his win set up a potential showdown with eight-division world champion Manny Pacquiao.

=== Horn vs. Pacquiao ===
Horn signed up to face WBO welterweight champion Manny Pacquiao in Brisbane on 23 April 2017. The announcement of the fight was met with relative surprise and disappointment due to Horn's limited exposure on the world stage, which led Pacquiao to comment "I don't know who Jeff Horn is". A tweet on 12 February by Pacquiao complicated negotiations when he said that he planned to fight in the United Arab Emirates. On 26 February, Pacquiao and Amir Khan announced that they had reached an agreement to fight, leaving Horn without an opponent. On 7 March the fight with Khan was called off and on 5 April a deal for the Pacquiao–Horn fight was reached. A press conference on 10 April signaled confirmation of the fight, which took place at Suncorp Stadium on 2 July 2017. Horn defeated Pacquiao via unanimous decision after 12 rounds. CompuBox stats showed that Pacquiao landed 182 out of 573 punches thrown (32%), whilst Horn landed only 92 of 625 thrown (15%). Many pundits, as well as many current and former boxers, believed Pacquiao had done enough to retain the WBO title.

Horn's win over Pacquiao was also criticized by some boxing analysts, sports journalists and fans alike, with some comparing the decision to that of the controversial Pacquiao vs. Timothy Bradley fight. In regards to the controversial scorecards, ESPN's Dan Rafael scored the fight 117–111 and ESPN analyst Teddy Atlas scored it 116–111, both for Pacquiao. The Guardian and the International Business Times both scored the fight in Pacquiao's favor as well, 117–111. BoxingScene had it 116–112 for Pacquiao, while CBS Sports scored the fight 114–114 even. BoxNation's Steve Bunce scored the fight 115–113 for Horn. In total, 12 of 15 media outlets scored the bout for Pacquiao, 2 of 15 outlets ruled in favor of Horn and 1 scored a draw.

Pacquiao claimed Horn got away with numerous dirty tactics in the fight, using illegal blows including elbows and headbutts.

==== Rescore by WBO ====
In response to a formal request by the Philippine Games and Amusements Board, the WBO agreed to review the fight between Pacquiao and Horn. It was scored round-by-round by five anonymous judges, but the WBO stated that they do not have the power to reverse the original result of the fight. The WBO rescored the fight in favor of Horn winning seven rounds and Pacquiao winning five.

=== First title defence ===
Initially, Horn was to give Pacquiao a rematch, but the rematch was delayed and did not eventuate. As a result, Horn instead made a voluntary defence of the WBO title against Gary Corcoran on 13 December 2017. Corcoran's corner decided to throw in the towel in the eleventh round, thus Horn retained the title via TKO. Both fighters were cut during the fight, but Horn was leading on the scorecards at the time of the stoppage.

=== First loss ===
Horn was challenged by Terence Crawford on 9 June 2018, for the WBO welterweight title. Crawford defeated Horn via technical knockout in the ninth round, becoming the new WBO welterweight champion.

=== Middleweight ===
==== Horn vs Mundine ====
Horn moved up to middleweight after the loss to Crawford and faced Anthony Mundine on 30 November 2018. He defeated Mundine in just 96 seconds.

==== Horn vs Zerafa ====
Next, Horn faced Michael Zerafa on 31 August 2019 in Bendigo. For the second time in his career, Horn lost via technical knockout in the ninth round.

==== Horn vs Zerafa II ====
Horn however won the rematch on 18 December 2019 by majority decision to bring his record to 20–2–1.

==== Horn vs Tszyu ====
On 26 August 2020, Horn faced one of Australia's best up-and-coming fighters, Tim Tszyu. Tszyu was ranked #5 by the WBO at super welterweight. Tszyu dropped Horn twice, once in the third and once in the sixth round, and continued to dominate Horn until the end of the eighth round, when Horn's corner decided not to continue the fight.

=== Retirement ===
On 2 July 2023, Horn announced his retirement, so he could undertake his role as an ambassador for an anti-bullying foundation. He stated that he had passed up offers of $1 million to return to the ring after his August 2020 loss to Tim Tszyu.

== Personal life ==
Horn lives in Brisbane and his father, Jeff Horn Sr., is a builder. Horn's mother, Liza Dykstra, works for the Saint Vincent de Paul Society. His grandfather, Ray Horn, fought in exhibition boxing matches in the Queensland outback during the 1930s. His second cousin is Graham Quirk, the former Lord Mayor of Brisbane.

Horn holds a Bachelor of Education degree from Griffith University and formerly worked as a physical education teacher for Pallara State School in Brisbane.

His daughter was born in 2017.

In his youth, Horn had been a victim of bullying and cited this as the reason he started boxing, initially as a means to defend himself.

He is an ambassador for an Australian anti-bullying foundation, speaking at schools about conflict management.

== Awards and recognitions ==
- October 2017 - Sport Australia Hall of Fame Don Award, recognising the sporting achievement of the year which has inspired the people of Australia.
- November 2017 - Queensland Sport Star of the Year.
- December 2017 - Sporting Moment of The Year at the Australian Institute of Sport Awards.

== Professional boxing record ==
24 fights	20 wins	3 losses
By knockout	13	3
By decision	7	0
Draws	1	

No.	Result	Record	Opponent	Type	Round, time	Date	Location	Notes
24	Loss	20–3–1	Tim Tszyu	TKO	8 (10), 3:00	26 Aug 2020	Queensland Country Bank Stadium, Townsville, Australia	For IBF Australasian and WBO Global junior-middleweight titles
23	Win	20–2–1	Michael Zerafa	MD	10	18 Dec 2019	Convention & Exhibition Centre, Brisbane, Australia	Won WBO Oriental middleweight title
22	Loss	19–2–1	Michael Zerafa	TKO	9 (10), 2:55	31 Aug 2019	Bendigo Stadium, Bendigo, Australia	Lost WBO Oriental middleweight title; For vacant IBF Asia Oceania middleweight title
21	Win	19–1–1	Anthony Mundine	KO	1 (12), 1:36	30 Nov 2018	Suncorp Stadium, Brisbane, Australia	Won WBO Oriental middleweight title
20	Loss	18–1–1	Terence Crawford	TKO	9 (12), 2:33	9 Jun 2018	MGM Grand Garden Arena, Paradise, Nevada, US	Lost WBO welterweight title
19	Win	18–0–1	Gary Corcoran	TKO	11 (12), 1:35	13 Dec 2017	Convention & Exhibition Centre, Brisbane, Australia	Retained WBO welterweight title
18	Win	17–0–1	Manny Pacquiao	UD	12	2 Jul 2017	Suncorp Stadium, Brisbane, Australia	Won WBO welterweight title
17	Win	16–0–1	Ali Funeka	TKO	6 (10), 0:30	10 Dec 2016	Vector Arena, Auckland, New Zealand	Retained WBO Inter-Continental welterweight title
16	Win	15–0–1	Rico Mueller	TKO	9 (12), 2:19	21 Oct 2016	Sleeman Centre, Brisbane, Australia	Retained IBF Inter-Continental welterweight title
15	Win	14–0–1	Randall Bailey	RTD	7 (12), 3:00	27 Apr 2016	Convention & Exhibition Centre, Brisbane, Australia	Retained IBF Inter-Continental and WBO Oriental welterweight titles; Won vacant WBO Inter-Continental welterweight title
14	Win	13–0–1	Ahmed El Mousaoui	UD	10	5 Dec 2015	Claudelands Arena, Hamilton, New Zealand	Retained IBF Inter-Continental and WBO Oriental welterweight titles
13	Win	12–0–1	Alfredo Rodolfo Blanco	UD	10	15 Oct 2015	The Trusts Arena, Henderson, New Zealand	Retained WBA Pan African, IBF Inter-Continental, WBO Oriental and PABA welterweight titles; Won vacant WBA Oceania interim welterweight title
12	Win	11–0–1	Viktor Plotnikov	TD	7 (10), 3:00	1 Aug 2015	Stadium Southland, Invercargill, New Zealand	Retained WBA Pan African, WBO Oriental and PABA welterweight titles; Won IBF Inter-Continental welterweight title; Unanimous TD: Horn cut from an accidental head clash
11	Win	10–0–1	Richmond Djarbeng	TKO	3 (12), 2:03	13 Jun 2015	Arena Manawatu, Palmerston North, New Zealand	Retained WBO Oriental and PABA welterweight titles; Won WBA Pan African welterweight title
10	Win	9–0–1	Robson Assis	KO	5 (10)	6 Dec 2014	Claudelands Arena, Hamilton, New Zealand	Retained WBO Oriental and PABA welterweight titles
9	Win	8–0–1	Fernando Ferreira da Silva	UD	12	5 Jul 2014	Vodafone Events Centre, Manukau, New Zealand	Retained WBO Oriental welterweight title; Won vacant PABA welterweight title
8	Win	7–0–1	Rivan Cesaire	TKO	9 (12), 1:44	19 Mar 2014	Jupiters Theatre, Gold Coast, Australia	Won vacant WBO Oriental welterweight title
7	Win	6–0–1	Naoufel Ben Rabah	UD	6	6 Dec 2013	Metro City Northbridge, Perth, Australia	
6	Win	5–0–1	Aswin Cabuy	TKO	2 (8), 0:31	16 Nov 2013	Royal International Convention Centre, Brisbane, Australia	
5	Win	4–0–1	Samuel Colomban	KO	1 (10), 1:18	12 Sep 2013	Melbourne Pavilion, Melbourne, Australia	Won vacant ANBF welterweight title
4	Draw	3–0–1	Rivan Cesaire	TD	3 (8), 0:35	8 Aug 2013	Southport RSL Club, Gold Coast, Australia	Unanimous TD: Cesaire cut from an accidental head clash
3	Win	3–0	Nuengsiam Kiatsongsang	TKO	1 (4), 2:42	9 May 2013	Royal International Convention Centre, Brisbane, Australia	
2	Win	2–0	Torin Rophia	KO	1 (6), 1:33	27 Apr 2013	Fortitude Stadium, Brisbane, Australia	
1	Win	1–0	Jody Allen	TKO	2 (4), 2:22	1 Mar 2013	Grand Star Receptions, Melbourne, Australia	

Sporting positions
Regional boxing titles
Vacant Title last held by Fred Tukes	Australian welterweight champion 12 September 2013 – January 2014; Vacated	Vacant Title next held by Rivan Cesaire
Vacant Title last held by Samuel Colomban	WBO Oriental welterweight champion 19 March 2014 – June 2016; Vacated	Vacant Title next held by Alexandr Zhuravskiy
Vacant Title last held by Tewa Kiram	PABA welterweight champion 5 July 2014 – December 2015; Vacated	Vacant Title next held by Tewa Kiram
Vacant Title last held by Richmond Djarbeng	WBA Pan African welterweight champion 13 June 2015 – November 2015; Vacated	Vacant Title next held by Paul Kamanga
Preceded by Viktor Plotnikov	IBF Inter-Continental welterweight champion 1 August 2015 – February 2017; Vacated	Vacant Title next held by Tsiko Mulovhedzi
New title	WBA Oceania welterweight champion Interim title 15 October 2015 – December 2015; Vacated	Title discontinued
Vacant Title last held by Sadam Ali	WBO Inter-Continental welterweight champion 27 April 2016 – April 2017; Vacated	Vacant Title next held by Gary Corcoran
Preceded by Anthony Mundine	WBO Oriental middleweight champion 30 November 2018 – 31 August 2019	Succeeded by Michael Zerafa
Preceded by Michael Zerafa	WBO Oriental middleweight champion 18 December 2019 – August 2020; Vacated	Vacant Title next held by Issac Hardman
World boxing titles
Preceded by Manny Pacquiao	WBO welterweight champion 2 July 2017 – 9 June 2018	Succeeded by Terence Crawford
