= Gary Corcoran =

English boxer

Personal information
- Nickname: 'Hellraiser'
- Nationality: British
- Born: 12 November 1990 (age 35) Wembley, London, U.K.
- Height: 5 ft 9 in (175 cm)
- Weight: Welterweight

Boxing career
- Reach: 68 in (173 cm)
- Stance: Orthodox

Boxing record
- Total fights: 21
- Wins: 18
- Win by KO: 8
- Losses: 3

Gary Corcoran (born 12 November 1990) is a British welterweight boxer.

== Career ==
Corcoran defeated Danny Butler by unanimous decision to win the vacant WBO Inter-Continental super welterweight title.

He lost to Liam Williams challenging for the BBBofC super welterweight title. Corcoran defeated Larry Ekundayo by split decision to win the vacant WBO Inter-Continental welterweight title.

Corcoran fought Jeff Horn for the WBO world welterweight title on 13 December 2017 and lost by TKO in round 11.
