= Nikita Tszyu =

Australian professional boxer (born 1998)

Personal information
- Nickname: The Butcher
- Born: Nikita Konstantinovich Tszyu; 19 January 1998 (age 28) Sydney, Australia
- Height: 177 cm (5 ft 10 in)
- Weight: Light-middleweight, Middleweight

Boxing career
- Reach: 178 cm (70 in)
- Stance: Southpaw

Boxing record
- Total fights: 14
- Wins: 12
- Win by KO: 10
- Draws: 1
- No contests: 1

Nikita Tszyu (Никита Константинович Цзю) is an Australian professional boxer. He is the son of former world champion boxer Kostya Tszyu and younger brother of boxer Tim Tszyu.

== Early life ==
Tszyu was born in Sydney, New South Wales, to Russian parents. His father Kostya is of ethnic Russian, Korean and Mongolian descent and his mother Natasha Anikina is of ethnic Russian descent. His father, Kostya, is a former undisputed light-welterweight champion and his brother, Tim, is also a professional boxer. After winning the junior national championship on occasions, Tszyu quit boxing at the age of 16 to focus on his schooling. Following high school graduation at Newington College in 2015, he enrolled in a Bachelor of Architectural Design at the University of Technology Sydney and worked in the industry for multiple years before returning to boxing at the age of 23.

== Professional boxing career ==
Tszyu made his professional boxing debut against Aaron Stahl in March 2022 at Nissan Arena in Brisbane and was victorious via technical knockout (TKO) in the second round. His professional debut took place almost exactly 30 years after his father's first professional fight.

Tszyu faced Mason Smith on 11 May 2022. He won the bout via technical knockout in the first round. He faced Ben Horn on 20 July 2022. He won the bout via unanimous decision.

Tszyu faced Darkon Dryden on 8 October 2022. He won the bout via corner retirement in the third round. He faced Bo Belbin on 12 March 2023, winning the bout via technical knockout in the fourth round.

Tszyu faced Benjamin Bommber on 24 May 2023. He won the bout via technical knockout in the first round. He faced Jack Brubaker on 24 August 2023, winnr the bout via technical knockout in the sixth round.

Tszyu defeated Dylan Biggs on 22 November 2023 to win the Australian super-welterweight title. He was scheduled to defend his Australian super-welterweight title against Danilo Creati on 24 April 2024 in Sydney, Australia. He won the fight by unanimous decision.

Tszyu was then scheduled to face Koen Mazoudier in Sydney, Australia on August 28, 2024 for the vacant IBF Australasian and WBO Inter-Continental super welterweight titles. He won by technical knockout in the ninth round after a fierce back-and-forth fight.

He fought Michael Zerafa for the vacant WBO International middleweight title at Brisbane Entertainment Centre in Brisbane, Australia, on 16 January 2026. The bout ended in a no contest after it was stopped in the third round due to Zerafa repeatedly telling the ringside doctor that he could not see due to a cut caused by an accidental clash of heads which took place in the previous round.

On 6 May 2026, Tszyu won the vacant WBO International super-welterweight title when his opponent, the previously undefeated Oscar Diaz, retired at the end of the sixth round of their fight at Newcastle Entertainment Centre in Newcastle, Australia.

He fought Ben Mahoney in an eliminator for a shot at the IBF super-welterweight title at the Gold Coast Convention and Exhibition Centre in Broadbeach, Queensland, on 26 August 2026. The bout ended in a split draw with one ringside judge seeing it 117–113 for Tszyu, one favouring Mahoney 115–113 and the third ruling the contest a 114–114 tie.

== Professional boxing record ==
14 fights	12 wins	0 losses
By knockout	10	0
By decision	2	0
Draws	1	
No contests	1	

No.	Result	Record	Opponent	Type	Round, time	Date	Location	Notes
14	Draw	12–0–1 (1)	Ben Mahoney	SD	12	26 Aug 2026	Gold Coast Convention and Exhibition Centre, Broadbeach, Queensland, Australia	Retained WBO International super-welterweight title
13	Win	12–0 (1)	Oscar Diaz	RTD	6 (10), 3:00	6 May 2026	Newcastle Entertainment Centre, Broadmeadow, Newcastle, Australia	Won vacant WBO International super-welterweight title
12	NC	11–0 (1)	Michael Zerafa	TD	3 (10), 0:02	16 Jan 2026	Brisbane Entertainment Centre, Brisbane, Australia	For vacant WBO International middleweight title; Zerafa repeatedly reported to the doctor that he could not see. Based on these reports, the doctor advised that the fight be stopped, and the referee, following that advice, had no choice but to wave the fight off
11	Win	11–0	Lulzim Ismaili	RTD	1 (10), 3:00	20 Aug 2025	ICC Sydney Theatre, Sydney, Australia	Won vacant WBO Inter-Continental super-welterweight title
10	Win	10–0	Koen Mazoudier	TKO	9 (10), 2:05	28 Aug 2024	ICC Sydney Theatre, Sydney, Australia	Won vacant IBF Australasian and WBO Inter-Continental super-welterweight titles
9	Win	9–0	Danilo Creati	UD	10	24 Apr 2024	Hordern Pavilion, Sydney, Australia	Retained Australian super-welterweight title
8	Win	8–0	Dylan Biggs	TKO	5 (10), 2:58	22 Nov 2023	Newcastle Entertainment Centre, Newcastle, New South Wales, Australia	Won Australian super-welterweight title
7	Win	7–0	Jack Brubaker	TKO	6 (8), 2:52	24 Aug 2023	Hordern Pavilion, Sydney, Australia	
6	Win	6–0	Benjamin Bommber	TKO	1 (6), 2:13	24 May 2023	Margaret Court Arena, Melbourne, Australia	
5	Win	5–0	Bo Belbin	TKO	4 (6), 1:46	12 Mar 2023	Qudos Bank Arena, Sydney, Australia	
4	Win	4–0	Darkon Dryden	RTD	3 (6), 3:00	8 Oct 2022	Newcastle Entertainment Centre, Newcastle, New South Wales, Australia	
3	Win	3–0	Ben Horn	UD	6	20 Jul 2022	Hordern Pavilion, Sydney, Australia	
2	Win	2–0	Mason Smith	TKO	1 (6), 2:41	11 May 2022	Newcastle Entertainment Centre, Newcastle, New South Wales, Australia	
1	Win	1–0	Aaron Stahl	KO	2 (6), 1:54	3 Mar 2022	Nissan Arena, Brisbane, Australia	
