= Tim Tszyu =

Australian professional boxer (born 1994)

Personal information
- Born: Timofei Konstantinovich Tszyu; 2 November 1994 (age 32) Sydney, New South Wales, Australia
- Height: 5 ft 9 in (175 cm)
- Weight: Light-middleweight; Middleweight

Boxing career
- Reach: 70 1/2 in (179 cm)
- Stance: Orthodox

Boxing record
- Total fights: 31
- Wins: 28
- Win by KO: 18
- Losses: 3
Medal record
Men's amateur boxing
Representing Australia
Australian National Championships
| Bronze medal – third place | 2011 Melbourne | Light-welterweight |

Timofei Konstantinovich Tszyu (Russian: Тимофей Константинович Цзю, [tʲɪmɐˈfɛj kɐnstɐnˈtʲinəvit͡ɕ ˈdzːʲʉ] born 2 November 1994) is an Australian professional boxer who held the World Boxing Organization (WBO) light-middleweight title from 2023 to 2024. He is the son of former light-welterweight world champion Kostya Tszyu and the older brother of Nikita Tszyu.

== Early life ==
Tszyu was born in Sydney, New South Wales, to Russian parents. His father Kostya Tszyu is of ethnic Russian, Korean and Mongolian descent and his mother Natasha Anikina is of ethnic Russian descent. His father, Kostya, is a former undisputed light-welterweight champion who was inducted into the International Boxing Hall of Fame in 2011. Tim's first sporting interest began to develop at the age of six when enrolled in gymnastics and later switched sports to association football at the age of 10. As a soccer player, he was selected to play for multiple local representative teams but his interest in the sport began to wane at the age of 13 when he temporarily relocated to Moscow with his family for a few months before returning to Sydney. At the age of 15, Tszyu decided to quit football and began pursuing a career in boxing. He attended St George Christian School and Newington College throughout his teenage years and enrolled in a business degree at the University of Technology Sydney following high school graduation. His brother, Nikita, is also a professional boxer.

Tszyu amassed an amateur boxing record of 33–1 before turning professional in 2016 at the age of 22.

== Professional career ==
=== Early career ===
After being away from the sport for four years due to a hand injury, Tszyu made his professional debut in December 2016 when he defeated Zorran Cassidy by unanimous decision (UD) at the Sydney Cricket Ground.

Tszyu won the WBC-ABCO Continental light-middleweight title in his seventh bout, with a UD over Wade Ryan.

In November 2019, Tszyu defeated Jack Brubaker by technical knockout (TKO) in the fourth round.

=== Rise up the ranks ===
==== Tszyu vs. Horn ====
On 26 August 2020, Tszyu defeated former WBO welterweight champion Jeff Horn via eighth-round corner stoppage at the Queensland Country Bank Stadium.

==== Tszyu vs. Hogan ====
On 31 March 2021, Tszyu, ranked #9 by The Ring, #1 by the WBO, #3 by the IBF, #7 by the WBA and #11 by the WBC fought Dennis Hogan who was ranked #10 by the WBC. Tszyu beat Hogan via a fifth-round TKO.

==== Tszyu vs. Spark ====
In his next bout, Tszyu fought and defeated Steve Spark via a third-round TKO.

==== Tszyu vs. Inoue ====
In his next bout, Tszyu fought and defeated a very resilient Takeshi Inoue, with a convincing unanimous decision win, winning on all three scorecards, 120-107, 120-107 and 119-108.

==== Tszyu vs. Gausha ====
In his next bout, Tszyu defeated 2012 Olympian Terrell Gausha in his first fight in America at The Armory in Minneapolis. After suffering a first round knockdown, Tszyu recovered and dominated from the 2nd round to win convincingly by unanimous decision, 114-113, 116-111 and 115-112.

=== WBO interim light-middleweight champion ===
==== Tszyu vs. Harrison ====
On 22 January 2023 it was announced Tszyu would take on former WBC 154-lb champion Tony Harrison for the WBO interim junior middleweight title on 12 March in Australia. He won the fight by 9th round TKO.

==== Tszyu vs. Ocampo ====
On 18 June 2023, Tszyu made the first defense of his WBO interim junior middleweight title against Carlos Ocampo. He won the fight by a 87 second 1st round KO.

=== WBO light-middleweight champion ===
==== Tszyu vs. Mendoza ====
On October 15, 2023 Tszyu defeated Brian Mendoza to defend his WBO junior middleweight. He was elevated to a full champion once Jermell Charlo faced Canelo Alvarez inside the ring for his undisputed super middleweight title on September 30, 2023.

==== Tszyu vs. Fundora ====
On March 30, 2024 at T-Mobile Arena in Las Vegas, Tszyu was scheduled to face former champion Keith Thurman. The fight was set at a catchweight of 155 lbs. On March 18, 2024 it was announced that Thurman suffered injury in training and withdrew. He was replaced by former interim WBC 154-pound champion Sebastian Fundora in the 12-round bout for Tszyu's WBO super welterweight title and vacant WBC title. Fundora won the fight by split decision.

=== Post-title career ===
==== Tszyu vs. Ortiz Jr ====
Tszyu was scheduled to face Vergil Ortiz Jr. on August 3, 2024 at BMO Stadium in Los Angeles. On May 30, 2024 it was announced that the fight was canceled on medical advice, with Tszyu requiring more time to heal from the injury sustained in his previous bout against Fundora.

==== Tszyu vs. Murtazaliev ====
Tszyu was expected to make his ring return on September 22, 2024 in Australia, battling it out in the IBF super welterweight title eliminator. On September 3, 2024, it was announced that Tszyu would challenge Bakhram Murtazaliev for his IBF super welterweight title on October 19, 2024 in Orlando, FL. Tszyu lost by third-round stoppage in a fight where he was knocked to the canvas four times before his corner threw in the towel to end the contest.

==== Tszyu vs. Spencer ====
Tszyu defeated Joseph Spencer in a super welterweight bout at Newcastle Entertainment Centre in Broadmeadow, NSW, Australia on April 6, 2025.

==== Tszyu vs. Fundora 2 ====
In a rematch from the previous year, Tszyu challenged WBC super-welterweight champion Sebastian Fundora at the MGM Grand Garden Arena, Paradise, Nevada, USA, on 19 July 2025. He lost the fight when he retired at the end of the seventh round.

==== Tszyu vs. Velazquez ====
On 17 December 2025 at the TikTok Entertainment Centre in Sydney, Australia, Tszyu defeated Anthony Velazquez over 10 rounds via unanimous decision.

==== Tszyu vs. Nurja ====
Tszyu won the vacant WBO international middleweight title with a unanimous decision success over Denis Nurja at Wollongong Entertainment Centre in Wollongong, Australia, on 4 April 2026.

==== Tszyu vs. Spence ====
Tszyu defeated former unified welterweight champion Errol Spence Jr. by Unanimous Decision on the 25 July 2026 in Australia.

==== Tszyu vs. Lara ====
Tszyu is scheduled to fight Erislandy Lara for the WBA middleweight title on 13 December 2026 at Cbus Super Stadium on the Gold Coast, Queensland in what has been dubbed one of the biggest boxing events in Australian boxing history.

== Professional boxing record ==
| 31 fights | 28 wins | 3 losses |
|---|---|---|
| By knockout | 18 | 2 |
| By decision | 10 | 1 |

| No. | Result | Record | Opponent | Type | Round, time | Date | Location | Notes |
|---|---|---|---|---|---|---|---|---|
| 31 | Win | 28–3 | Errol Spence Jr. | UD | 12 | 26 Jul 2026 | Afterpay Arena, Sydney, Australia | |
| 30 | Win | 27–3 | Denis Nurja | UD | 10 | 4 Apr 2026 | Wollongong Entertainment Centre, Wollongong, Australia | Won vacant WBO International middleweight title |
| 29 | Win | 26–3 | Anthony Velazquez | UD | 10 | 17 Dec 2025 | TikTok Entertainment Centre, Sydney, Australia | |
| 28 | Loss | 25–3 | Sebastian Fundora | RTD | 7 (12), 3:00 | 19 Jul 2025 | MGM Grand Garden Arena, Paradise, Nevada, U.S. | For WBC light middleweight title |
| 27 | Win | 25–2 | Joseph Spencer | TKO | 4 (10), 2:18 | 6 Apr 2025 | Entertainment Centre, Newcastle, Australia | Won vacant WBO Inter-Continental light middleweight title |
| 26 | Loss | 24–2 | Bakhram Murtazaliev | TKO | 3 (12), 1:55 | 19 Oct 2024 | Caribe Royale, Orlando, Florida, U.S. | For IBF light middleweight title |
| 25 | Loss | 24–1 | Sebastian Fundora | SD | 12 | 30 Mar 2024 | T-Mobile Arena, Paradise, Nevada, U.S. | Lost WBO light middleweight title; For vacant WBC light middleweight title |
| 24 | Win | 24–0 | Brian Mendoza | UD | 12 | 15 Oct 2023 | Convention and Exhibition Centre, Gold Coast, Australia | Retained WBO light middleweight title |
| 23 | Win | 23–0 | Carlos Ocampo | KO | 1 (12), 1:28 | 18 Jun 2023 | Convention and Exhibition Centre, Gold Coast, Australia | Retained WBO interim light middleweight title |
| 22 | Win | 22–0 | Tony Harrison | TKO | 9 (12), 2:43 | 12 Mar 2023 | Qudos Bank Arena, Sydney, Australia | Won vacant WBO interim light middleweight title |
| 21 | Win | 21–0 | Terrell Gausha | UD | 12 | 26 Mar 2022 | Minneapolis Armory, Minneapolis, Minnesota, U.S. | Retained WBO Global light middleweight title |
| 20 | Win | 20–0 | Takeshi Inoue | UD | 12 | 17 Nov 2021 | Qudos Bank Arena, Sydney, Australia | Retained WBO Global light middleweight title; Won WBO Asia Pacific light middleweight title |
| 19 | Win | 19–0 | Steve Spark | TKO | 3 (10), 2:22 | 7 Jul 2021 | Entertainment Centre, Newcastle, Australia | Retained WBO Global light middleweight title; Won vacant Commonwealth light middleweight title |
| 18 | Win | 18–0 | Dennis Hogan | TKO | 5 (10), 2:29 | 31 Mar 2021 | Entertainment Centre, Newcastle, Australia | Retained WBO Global light middleweight title |
| 17 | Win | 17–0 | Bowyn Morgan | TKO | 1 (10), 1:47 | 16 Dec 2020 | Bankwest Stadium, Sydney, Australia | Retained IBF Australasian and WBO Global light middleweight titles |
| 16 | Win | 16–0 | Jeff Horn | RTD | 8 (10), 3:00 | 26 Aug 2020 | Queensland Country Bank Stadium, Townsville, Australia | Retained IBF Australasian and WBO Global light middleweight titles |
| 15 | Win | 15–0 | Jack Brubaker | TKO | 4 (12), 0:23 | 6 Dec 2019 | International Convention Centre, Sydney, Australia | Retained IBF Australasian and WBO Global light middleweight titles |
| 14 | Win | 14–0 | Dwight Ritchie | UD | 10 | 14 Aug 2019 | International Convention Centre, Sydney, Australia | Won IBF Australasian and inaugural WBO Global light middleweight titles |
| 13 | Win | 13–0 | Joel Camilleri | UD | 10 | 15 May 2019 | The Star, Sydney, Australia | Won Australian light middleweight title |
| 12 | Win | 12–0 | Denton Vassell | TKO | 2 (10), 0:23 | 8 Feb 2019 | Hordern Pavilion, Sydney, Australia | Won vacant WBA Oceania interim light middleweight title |
| 11 | Win | 11–0 | Marcos Jesus Cornejo | TKO | 1 (10), 2:31 | 8 Sep 2018 | Bendigo Stadium, Bendigo, Australia | |
| 10 | Win | 10–0 | Stevie Ongen Ferdinandus | KO | 1 (10), 1:41 | 3 Aug 2018 | Technology Park, Sydney, Australia | Retained WBC–ABCO Continental light middleweight title |
| 9 | Win | 9–0 | Larry Siwu | TKO | 4 (10), 0:44 | 24 May 2018 | The Star, Sydney, Australia | Retained WBC–ABCO Continental light middleweight title |
| 8 | Win | 8–0 | Ruben Webster | TKO | 5 (6), 2:15 | 7 Apr 2018 | Convention & Exhibition Centre, Brisbane, Australia | |
| 7 | Win | 7–0 | Wade Ryan | UD | 10 | 22 Oct 2017 | The Star, Sydney, Australia | Won vacant WBC–ABCO Continental light middleweight title |
| 6 | Win | 6–0 | Christopher Khan | TKO | 2 (5), 1:30 | 22 Jul 2017 | Rumours International, Toowoomba, Australia | |
| 5 | Win | 5–0 | Adam Fitzsimmons | RTD | 3 (6), 3:00 | 22 May 2017 | QT Hotel, Gold Coast, Australia | |
| 4 | Win | 4–0 | Ivana Siau | TKO | 2 (4), 2:45 | 6 May 2017 | Vodafone Events Centre, Auckland, New Zealand | |
| 3 | Win | 3–0 | Ben Nelson | TKO | 3 (4), 1:41 | 8 Apr 2017 | Doltone House, Sydney, Australia | |
| 2 | Win | 2–0 | Mark Dalby | TKO | 3 (4), 1:02 | 3 Feb 2017 | Adelaide Oval, Adelaide, Australia | |
| 1 | Win | 1–0 | Zorran Cassady | UD | 6 | 17 Dec 2016 | Sydney Cricket Ground, Sydney, Australia | |

== See also ==
- Notable boxing families
- List of world light-middleweight boxing champions

Sporting positions
Regional boxing titles
| New title | WBO Global light middleweight champion 14 August 2019 – 2022; Vacated | Vacant Title next held by Slawa Spomer |
| Vacant Title last held by JJ Metcalf | Commonwealth light middleweight champion 7 July – 2021; Vacated | Vacant Title next held by Louis Greene |
World boxing titles
| Vacant Title last held by Patrick Teixeira | WBO light middleweight champion Interim title 12 March – 30 September 2023; Promoted to full champion | Vacant Title next held by Terence Crawford |
| Preceded by Jermell Charlo stripped | WBO light middleweight champion 30 September 2023 – 30 March 2024 | Succeeded by Sebastian Fundora |
