= Brian Mendoza =

American boxer

Personal information
- Nickname: La Bala
- Born: Brian Marino Mendoza; February 13, 1994 (age 32) Albuquerque, New Mexico. U.S.
- Height: 5 ft 10 in (178 cm)
- Weight: Light middleweight; Middleweight

Boxing career
- Reach: 70 in (178 cm)
- Stance: Orthodox

Boxing record
- Total fights: 28
- Wins: 23
- Win by KO: 16
- Losses: 5

Brian Marino Mendoza (born February 13, 1994) is an American professional boxer who held the WBC (Interim) light-middleweight in 2023 and challenged for the WBO light-middleweight title in 2023.

== Professional career ==
Mendoza turned pro in 2014 and currently trains with Cuban trainer Ismael Salas.

After compiling a record of 20–2, he knocked out former world titleholder Jeison Rosario on just 10 days notice. Mendoza followed up this upset victory with a stunning 7th round KO over previously undefeated Sebastian Fundora to win the World Boxing Council Interim Light Middleweight World Title. though his success was short-lived. In his next match he lost to WBO junior middleweight champ Tim Tszyu, being stripped of his own title in the process.

In 2024, he took a fight at short notice against Serhii Bohachuk 23-1(23) for the vacant WBC interim junior middleweight championship, which was his old title. He lost by a unanimous decision.

Mendoza facef Yoenis Tellez on March 28, 2026, at MGM Grand Garden Arena in Las Vegas He lost by unanimous decision.

== Professional boxing record ==
28 fights	23 wins	5 losses
By knockout	17	0
By decision	6	5

No.	Result	Record	Opponent	Type	Round, time	Date	Location	Notes
28	Loss	23–5	Yoenis Tellez	UD	10	Mar 28, 2026	MGM Grand Garden Arena, Paradise, Nevada, U.S.	
27	Win	23–4	Jesus Antonio Rojas	TKO	4 (8), 0:10	Jul 4, 2025	Ciudad Juárez, Chihuahua, Mexico	
26	Loss	22–4	Serhii Bohachuk	UD	12	Mar 30, 2024	T-Mobile Arena, Paradise, Nevada, U.S.	For vacant interim WBC light-middleweight title
25	Loss	22–3	Tim Tszyu	UD	12	Oct 15, 2023	Gold Coast Convention Centre, Broadbeach, Australia	For WBO light-middleweight title
24	Win	22–2	Sebastian Fundora	KO	7 (12), 0:41	Apr 8, 2023	Dignity Health Sports Park, Carson, California, U.S.	Won interim WBC light middleweight title.
23	Win	21–2	Jeison Rosario	KO	5 (10), 0:35	Nov 5, 2022	Armory, Minneapolis, Minnesota, U.S.	
22	Win	20–2	Benjamin Whitaker	TKO	5 (8), 0:51	Mar 26, 2022	Armory, Minneapolis, Minnesota, U.S.	
21	Loss	19–2	Jesus Ramos	UD	10	Sep 5, 2021	Armory, Minneapolis, Minnesota, U.S.	
20	Win	19–1	Thomas LaManna	UD	10	Aug 29, 2020	Microsoft Theater, Los Angeles, California, U.S.	
19	Loss	18–1	Larry Gomez	SD	8	Nov 30, 2019	The Cosmopolitan of Las Vegas, Paradise, Nevada, U.S.	
18	Win	18–0	Rosemberg Gomez	KO	1 (8), 2:12	Aug 17, 2019	Banc of California Stadium, Los Angeles, California, U.S.	
17	Win	17–0	Carlos Mohamed Rodriguez	KO	2 (8), 1:45	May 4, 2019	Stockton Arena, Stockton, California, U.S.	
16	Win	16–0	John David Charles	TKO	3 (6), 0:40	Nov 11, 2017	Lujan Building, Albuquerque, New Mexico, U.S.	
15	Win	15–0	Tyler Pogline	TKO	2 (6)	Mar 18, 2017	Convention Center, Albuquerque, New Mexico, U.S.	
14	Win	14–0	Daniel Calzada	UD	6	Jul 9, 2016	Santa Santa Ana Star Center, Rio Rancho, New Mexico, U.S.	
13	Win	13–0	Joel Vargas	TKO	3 (6), 0:53	Feb 6, 2016	United Wireless Arena, Dodge City, Kansas, U.S.	
12	Win	12–0	Francisco Isata	TKO	2 (4), 2:49	Jan 16, 2016	ABC Sports Complex, Springfield, Virginia, U.S.	
11	Win	11–0	Anthony Hill	UD	4	Dec 19, 2015	Lea County Events Center, Hobbs, New Mexico, U.S.	
10	Win	10–0	Eddie Cordova	TKO	1 (6), 1:02	Nov 14, 2015	ABC Sports Complex, Springfield, Virginia, U.S.	
9	Win	9–0	Michael Pickett	TKO	1 (4), 2:08	Oct 9, 2015	Riverside Ballroom, Green Bay, Wisconsin, U.S.	
8	Win	8–0	John Rozema	TKO	1 (4), 2:16	Sep 5, 2015	Buffalo Thunder Casino, Pojoaque, New Mexico, U.S.	
7	Win	7–0	Eric Rosales	SD	4	Aug 22, 2015	United Wireless Arena, Dodge City, Kansas, U.S.	
6	Win	6–0	Dontre King	KO	3 (4), 1:35	Jun 6, 2015	ABC Sports Complex, Springfield, Virginia, U.S.	
5	Win	5–0	Ivan Lucero	TKO	1 (4), 1:57	May 9, 2015	Buffalo Thunder Casino, Pojoaque, New Mexico, U.S.	
4	Win	4–0	Javier Eduardo Rivera	UD	4	Feb 28, 2015	Celebrity Theatre, Phoenix, Arizona, U.S.	
3	Win	3–0	Lazaro Jay Dominguez	UD	4	Nov 15, 2014	Celebrity Theatre, Phoenix, Arizona, U.S.	
2	Win	2–0	Jesus Lopez	KO	1 (4), 1:49	Jul 26, 2014	Celebrity Theatre, Phoenix, Arizona, U.S.	
1	Win	1–0	Daniel Gonzalez	TKO	1 (4), 0:39	May 10, 2014	Buffalo Thunder Casino, Pojoaque, New Mexico, U.S.	

Sporting positions
World boxing titles
Preceded by Sebastian Fundora	WBC super welterweight champion Interim title April 8 – October 15, 2023; Stripped	Vacant Title next held by Serhii Bohachuk
