= Elnur Samedov =

Russian boxer (born 1993)

Elnur Samedov Эльнур Самедов
Personal information
- Nationality: Russian
- Born: August 2, 1993 (age 33) Şahağac, Azerbaijan
- Height: 5 ft 5 in (165 cm)
- Weight: Super featherweight; Lightweight

Boxing career
- Stance: Southpaw

Boxing record
- Total fights: 23
- Wins: 22
- Win by KO: 11
- Losses: 1

Elnur Mamed Ogly Samedov (Russian: Элнур Мамед Оглы Самедов, born August 2, 1993) is a Russian professional boxer.

== Professional career ==
Samedov turned professional in 2016. In his thirteenth fight he beat Zoravor Petrosyan via unanimous decision. In his first world title opportunity, Samedov would defeat John Lenon Gutierrez to win the WBA interim super-featherweight title.

== Professional boxing record ==
23 fights	22 wins	1 loss
By knockout	11	0
By decision	11	1

No.	Result	Record	Opponent	Type	Round, time	Date	Location	Notes
23	Win	22–1	John Lenon Gutierrez	TKO	11 (12), 2:47	Feb 14, 2026	Traktor Ice Arena, Chelyabinsk, Russia	Won WBA Interim super-featherweight title
22	Win	21–1	Moruff Akanji	KO	7 (8), 0:45	Nov 22, 2025	RCC Boxing Academy, Yekaterinburg, Russia	
21	Win	20–1	Saidi Mkola	TKO	6 (8), 0:47	Mar 15, 2025	RCC Boxing Academy, Yekaterinburg, Russia	
20	Win	19–1	Zhora Hamazaryan	UD	10	Sep 6, 2024	Traktor Ice Arena, Chelyabinsk, Russia	
19	Win	18–1	Dmitry Khasiev	RTD	4 (10), 3:00	Dec 23, 2023	Novy Urengoy, Russia	
18	Win	17–1	Andranik Grigorian	TKO	7 (8), 1:01	Aug 17, 2023	KRK Uralets, Yekaterinburg, Russia	
17	Win	16–1	Mirzamukhammad Khikmatullaev	RTD	3 (8), 3:00	Mar 7, 2023	Palace of Sporting Games, Yekaterinburg, Russia	
16	Win	15–1	Moussa Gholam	SD	10	Dec 11, 2022	Palace of Sporting Games, Yekaterinburg, Russia	
15	Win	14–1	Javokhirbek Karimov	KO	1 (8), 1:59	Jul 23, 2022	RCC Boxing Academy, Yekaterinburg, Russia	
14	Win	13–1	Stanislav Kalitskiy	TKO	5 (8), 0:20	May 21, 2022	RCC Boxing Academy, Yekaterinburg, Russia	
13	Win	12–1	Zoravor Petrosian	UD	10	Nov 4, 2021	RCC Boxing Academy, Yekaterinburg, Russia	
12	Win	11–1	Alexander Podolsky	TKO	8 (10), 2:47	Oct 15, 2020	Falcon Club, Minsk, Belarus	
11	Win	10–1	Gonzalo Omar Manriquez	UD	8	Nov 14, 2019	Hotel Azimut, Saint Petersburg, Russia	
10	Win	9–1	Aik Shakhnazaryan	RTD	8 (10), 3:00	Apr 20, 2019	Floyd Mayweather Boxing Academy, Zhukovka, Russia	
9	Win	8–1	Viskhan Murzabekov	SD	10	Feb 2, 2019	Vityazevo, Russia	Won vacant Russian lightweight title
8	Win	7–1	Islom Sadridinov	UD	6	Sep 29, 2018	Soviet Wings Sport Palace, Moscow, Russia	
7	Loss	6–1	Nikita Kuznetsov	SD	10	Mar 17, 2018	Floyd Mayweather Boxing Academy, Zhukovka, Russia	For vacant Russian lightweight title
6	Win	6–0	Dmitry Khasiev	UD	12	May 27, 2017	Korston Club, Moscow, Russia	Won vacant WBC CISBB lightweight title
5	Win	5–0	Milan Delic	TKO	3 (8), 2:30	Mar 25, 2017	RGK "Kapitan", Anapa, Russia	
4	Win	4–0	Taras Kovalenko	UD	6	Feb 12, 2017	Bulldog Fight Club, Krasnodar, Russia	
3	Win	3–0	Odiljon Mirzarakhimov	SD	6	Nov 26, 2016	Concert Hall, Pyatigorsk, Russia	
2	Win	2–0	Dmitry Drobnov	UD	4	Oct 14, 2016	Korston Club, Moscow, Russia	
1	Win	1–0	Evgeny Smelov	UD	4	Aug 19, 2016	Mandarin Hall, Adler, Russia	

== See also ==
- List of male boxers
- List of southpaw stance boxers
- List of world super-featherweight boxing champions

Sporting positions
Regional boxing titles
Vacant Title last held by Denis Shafikov	WBC CISBB lightweight champion May 27, 2017 – 2019; Vacated	Vacant Title next held by Vladimir Saruhanyan
Vacant Title last held by Nikita Kuznetsov	Russian lightweight champion Feb 2, 2019 – 2019; Vacated	Vacant Title next held by Aik Shakhnazaryan
World boxing titles
Vacant Title last held by Jazza Dickens	WBA super-featherweight champion Interim title February 14, 2026 – September 9, 2026; Promoted	Vacant
Preceded by Anthony Cacace as Champion; Status changed	WBA super-featherweight champion Regular title September 9, 2026 – present	Incumbent
