= Jermell Charlo vs. Brian Castaño =

Boxing competition

- Date: July 17, 2021
- Venue: AT&T Center, San Antonio, Texas, U.S.
- Title(s) on the line: WBA (Super), WBC, IBF, WBO, The Ring undisputed and TBRB light middleweight titles

Tale of the tape
Boxer	Jermell Charlo	Brian Castaño
Nickname	"Iron Man"	"El Boxi"
Hometown	Lafeyette, Louisiana, U.S.	Isidro Casanova, Buenos Aires Province, Argentina
Purse	$1,000,000	$500,000
Pre-fight record	34–1 (18 KO)	17–0–1 (12 KO)
Age	31 years, 1 month	31 years, 10 months
Height	5 ft 11 in (180 cm)	5 ft 7 1/2 in (171 cm)
Weight	153 lb (69 kg)	153 1/4 lb (70 kg)
Style	Orthodox	Orthodox
Recognition	WBA (Super), WBC, IBF, and The Ring; Light Middleweight Champion; TBRB; No. 1 Ranked Light Middleweight	WBO; Light Middleweight Champion; TBRB; No. 2 Ranked Light Middleweight; The Ring; No. 3 Ranked Light Middleweight

Result
- 12-round split draw (117-111, 114-114, 113-114)

Jermell Charlo vs. Brian Castaño was a unification professional boxing match contested between WBA (Super), WBC, IBF, and The Ring light middleweight champion, Jermell Charlo, and WBO light middleweight champion, Brian Castaño, with the winner set to become the first undisputed light middleweight champion since Winky Wright in 2004 and the first in the four-belt era. The bout took place on July 17, 2021 that ended in a split draw.

== Background ==
After regaining his WBC title with a technical knockout victory against Tony Harrison in 2019, Charlo unified the light middleweight division with a knockout victory against WBA (Super) and IBF champion Jeison Rosario in 2020, picking up the vacant Ring magazine title in the process. Following the win, reigning WBO champion Patrick Teixeira expressed a desire to face Charlo in a fight for the undisputed championship. However, Teixeira had to fulfill his obligation to face the WBO's mandatory challenger, former WBA (Regular) champion, Brian Castaño.

In late 2019, after Teixeira was elevated from interim to full champion, the WBO designated Castaño as Teixeira's mandatory challenger. The pair faced off in February 2021, with Castaño emerging victorious via unanimous decision. Before the win, Castaño spoke of a potential matchup with Charlo, saying, "Teixeira is a great fighter. But when I win this fight, I want to fight with [Jermell] Charlo next. He's a great fighter, the fights with him pay good and he has three titles. After this, he is my next victim."

In April 2021 it was announced that Charlo would next defend his world titles in an attempt to unify and create an undisputed champion against WBO light middleweight champion Castaño. It was rumoured the fight would take place in Charlo's hometown of Houston. The fight would be broadcast on Showtime on June 17, and it was revealed the card would take place at the AT&T Center in San Antonio. The winner would be crowned the first ever undisputed light middleweight champion in history, in the four-belt era. This was the fight which Charlo expected would put him in the boxing hall of fame. Most bookmakers listed Charlo a 2-1 favorite. Charlo stated this was the biggest fight of his career, and whilst showing respect towards Castaño, he felt he had fought tougher opponents in the past. Charlo was asked if predicted a knockout win, to which he responded, “I don’t know.” The weigh in took place at the Thompson San Antonio-Riverwalk hotel, where Charlo weighed 153 pounds, while Castaño officially weighed 153¼ pounds.

== The fight ==
A competitive fight between them ended in a split draw, with scores of 117-111 Charlo, 114-113 Castaño and 114-114 even. Charlo won the final three round on all three judges scorecards to avoid an upset loss. Castaño set a good pace for the first nine rounds, beat Charlo to the punch, pushing him against the ropes and avoided a lot of Charlo's attack. A counter left hook in the tenth round from Charlo began to steer the fight in his direction. Castaño was put on unsteady legs. Fans anticipated the end was near, however Castaño began exchanging with Charlo. Before the last round, Charlo's trainer Derrick James told him he needed a knockout to win. The result was controversial, with much attention being brought to judge Nelson Vazquez’s 117-111 Charlo card, which was described as "terrible" by Andre Ward. In the post-fight press conference, Charlo commented "...honestly I think it was a closer fight than it seems. Somebody had it like 117-111... 117-111 was kind of a large range." Charlo thought he'd won, believing he hurt Castaño more than he hurt him. Castaño felt he was robbed off a win. Both boxers were open to rematch, in order to finally crown an undisputed champion. WBC president Mauricio Sulaiman stated the result was fair.

According to Compubox, Charlo landed 151 of 533 punches thrown (28.3%) and Castaño landed 173 of his 586 thrown (29.5%). He out-landed Charlo in power punches 164-98.

The fight averaged 422,000 viewers and peaked at 536,000 viewers, which came towards the end, on Showtime, which made the fight the most-watched live boxing match since December 2019.

== Aftermath ==
A rematch was fought on May 15, 2022, when Charlo defeated Castano by a tenth round technical knockout to unify the championships.

== Fight card ==
Confirmed bouts:

Weight Class		vs.		Method	Round	Time	Notes
Light middleweight	(United States) Jermell Charlo (c)	vs.	(Argentina) Brian Castaño (c)	Split draw: 117-111, 114-114, 113-114	12/12		^{Note 1}
Lightweight	(United States) Rolando Romero (c)	def.	(Sweden) Anthony Yigit	Technical knockout	7 (12)	1:54	^{Note 2}
Middleweight	(Uruguay) Amílcar Vidal	def.	(United States) Immanuwel Aleem	Decision (majority): 97-93, 97-93, 95-95	10/10

^Note 1 For WBA (Super), WBC, IBF, WBO, and The Ring light middleweight titles
^Note 2 Romero's WBA interim lightweight title no longer at stake due to Yigit missing weight

== Broadcasting ==
Country	Broadcaster
Argentina	TyC Sports
United Kingdom	TrillerTV
United States	Showtime

Preceded by vs. Jeison Rosario	Jermell Charlo's bouts 17 July 2021	Succeeded by Rematch
Preceded by vs. Patrick Teixeira	Brian Castaño's bouts 17 July 2021	Succeeded by Rematch
