= Andrew Hernandez =

American boxer

Personal information
- Nickname: Hurricane
- Nationality: Mexican-American
- Born: 29 December 1985 (age 40) Phoenix, Arizona, USA
- Height: 5 ft 10 in (178 cm)
- Weight: Middleweight

Boxing career
- Reach: 70 in (178 cm)
- Stance: Orthodox

Boxing record
- Total fights: 33
- Wins: 21
- Win by KO: 9
- Losses: 8
- Draws: 2
- No contests: 2

Andrew “Hurricane” Hernandez (born December 29, 1985) is an American professional boxer.

== Professional boxing record ==
30 fights, 20 wins (9 knockouts), 7 loss, 2 draw, 1 NC
No.	Result	Record	Opponent	Type	Rd., Time	Date	Location	Notes
30	Draw	20-7-2 (1)	(United States) Fidel Hernandez	MD	10	Oct 20, 2018	(United States) Celebrity Theater, Phoenix, Arizona, U.S.	
29	Win	20-7-1 (1)	(United States) Roberto Yong	UD	8	Jun 30, 2018	(United States) Celebrity Theater, Phoenix, Arizona, U.S.	
28	NC	19-7-1 (1)	(United States) Mike Gavronski	NC	10	Nov 18, 2017	(United States) Emerald Queen Casino, Tacoma, Washington, U.S.	
27	Loss	19-7-1	(United States) Caleb Plant	UD	10	Sep 8, 2017	(United States) Hard Rock Hotel and Casino, Las Vegas, Nevada, U.S.	
26	Loss	19-6-1	(Brazil) Patrick Teixeira	UD	8	Jul 29, 2017	(United States) Casino Del Sol, Tucson, Arizona, U.S.	
25	Win	19-5-1	(Mexico) Charly Valdez	KO	2 (6)	Apr 29, 2017	(United States) Celebrity Theater, Phoenix, Arizona, U.S.	
24	Win	18-5-1	(United States) Sijuola Ade Shabazz	UD	10	Feb 25, 2017	(United States) Celebrity Theater, Phoenix, Arizona, U.S.	Won vacant NABA - USA middleweight title
23	Win	17-5-1	(Mexico) Charly Soto	KO	2 (6)	Jan 21, 2017	Club Deportivo Tecate de Bachoco, Guasave, Sinaloa, Mexico	
22	Loss	16-5-1	(United States) Jesse Hart	TKO	3 (10)	Nov 4, 2016	(United States) Treasure Island Casino, Las Vegas, Nevada, U.S.	
21	Win	16-4-1	(Mexico) Adrian Lopez	TKO	4 (6)	Oct 14, 2016	Score Sports Bar, Guasave, Sinaloa, Mexico	
20	Win	15-4-1	(Mexico) David Cuen	KO	2 (6)	Sep 3, 2016	CUM Aguaprieta, Agua Prieta, Sonora, Mexico	
19	Win	14-4-1	(Mexico) Jorge Silva	RTD	6 (10)	Aug 26, 2016	(United States) Legends Event Center, Phoenix, Arizona, U.S.	
18	Win	13-4-1	(Mexico) Mario Alexander Blanco	KO	1 (6)	Jul 29, 2016	Score Sport Bar, Guasave, Sinaloa, Mexico	
17	Win	12-4-1	(Russia) Arif Magomedov	UD	10	May 21, 2016	(United States) Las Vegas Event Center, Las Vegas, Nevada, U.S.	Won vacant WBC-USNBC middleweight title
16	Win	11-4-1	(Colombia) Dionisio Miranda	RTD	7 (10), 3:00	March 26, 2016	(United States) Emerald Queen Casino, Tacoma, Washington, U.S.	
15	Loss	10-4-1	(Egypt) Ahmed Elbiali	UD	8	January 12, 2016	(United States) Cowboys Dance Hall, San Antonio, Texas, U.S.	
14	Loss	10-3-1	(United States) Kyrone Davis	UD	6	December 29, 2015	(United States) Event Center, Bethlehem, Pennsylvania, U.S.	
13	Win	10-2-1	(United States) Jeff Page Jr	TKO	10 (10), 1:17	November 7, 2015	(United States) Beech Activity Center, Wichita, Kansas, U.S.	Won vacant UBF Inter-Continental super middleweight title
12	Loss	9-2-1	(United States) Louis Rose	TKO	8 (8), 2:02	August 15, 2015	(United States) We Ko Pa Casino, Fort McDowell, Arizona, U.S.	For WBC-NABF light middleweight title
11	Win	9-1-1	(Mexico) Eduardo Tercero	UD	6	June 13, 2015	(United States) Glendale Renaissance Hotel, Glendale, Arizona, U.S.	
10	Loss	8-1-1	(United States) Jerry Odom	TKO	1 (8), 2:47	March 13, 2015	(United States) The Space at Westbury, Westbury, New York, U.S.	
9	Win	8-0-1	(United States) Jerry Odom	DQ	4 (6), 0:30	January 9, 2015	(United States) Madison Square Garden Theater, New York City, U.S.	
