= Canelo Álvarez vs. Jermell Charlo =

Boxing match

Undisputed vs. Undisputed
- Date: 30 September 2023
- Venue: T-Mobile Arena; Paradise, Nevada, United States
- Title(s) on the line: WBA (Super), WBC, IBF, WBO The Ring and TBRB undisputed super middleweight titles

Tale of the tape
| Boxer | Saúl Álvarez | Jermell Charlo |
| Nickname | Canelo ("Cinnamon") | Iron Man |
| Hometown | Guadalajara, Jalisco, Mexico | Lafayette, Louisiana, U.S. |
| Pre-fight record | 59–2–2 (39 KO) | 35–1–1 (19 KO) |
| Age | 33 years, 2 months | 33 years, 4 months |
| Height | 5 ft 71/2 in (243 cm) | 5 ft 11 in (180 cm) |
| Weight | 167 1/2 lb (76 kg) | 167 1/2 lb (76 kg) |
| Style | Orthodox | Orthodox |
| Recognition | WBA (Super), WBC, IBF, WBO, The Ring and TBRB undisputed Super Middleweight Champion; The Ring No. 4 ranked pound-for-pound fighter 4-division world champion | WBA (Super), WBC, IBF, WBO, The Ring and TBRB undisputed Light Middleweight Champion |

Result
- Álvarez wins via 12-round unanimous decision (118-109, 118-109, 119-108)

Canelo Álvarez vs. Jermell Charlo, billed as Undisputed vs. Undisputed, was a professional boxing match contested on 30 September 2023, for the undisputed Super Middleweight championship.

== Background ==
After beating John Ryder on home soil in May 2023, Canelo Álvarez was linked to both undefeated former champion David Benavidez, Jermall Charlo, and a rematch with Light heavyweight champion Dmitry Bivol. On 23 June he confirmed a September return to the ring as well his switch to Premier Boxing Champions on a three-fight deal after choosing to part ways with Matchroom Sport.

Undisputed Light middleweight champion Jermell Charlo had been out of the ring since he unified the division in his rematch with Brian Castaño in May 2022. A planned bout with WBO mandatory Tim Tszyu on 29 January was postponed, following Charlo reporting that he had broken two bones in his left hand. Tszyu would subsequently win the Interim title and the WBO would order Charlo to defend their belt against Tszyu before September 30 or be stripped.

In June, it was announced, instead of defending his titles against Tszyu, Charlo (35–1–1, 19 KOs) would instead move up two-weight divisions to challenge Undisputed super middleweight champion Álvarez (59–2–2, 39 KOs) in September 2023. In order to make the fight, Álvarez, signed a 3-fight deal with Charlo's handlers, PBC. For months, rumours circulated Álvarez would be fighting Jermall, so the news that he was fighting Jermell came as a shock to many in the boxing industry, mostly because Charlo had never competed above 154 pounds at championship level. The fight was expected to be on PPV.

The fight was being billed as "Undisputed vs. Undisputed". The WBO would allow Charlo to enter the ring and be announced by the MC as the undisputed light middleweight champion, however, after the first bell rung, he would be stripped of the WBO title, elevating Tszyu to full championship status. Charlo spoke on the matter calling it unfair by the WBO, as he only recently won the title and fully intended to fight at the light middleweight division after the fight with Álvarez. When asked about not fighting Tszyu, Charlo said, “I know Tim Tszyu was my [mandatory] challenger. But he does nothing for my career.” Despite what many believed, the fight was not announced to take place on Mexican Independence Weekend, but instead on September 30, at the T-Mobile Arena in Las Vegas.

Charlo stated he was not surprised to get the call. He said, "I wasn't surprised [to get the call to fight Álvarez],” Charlo said on Showtime. This is nothing new for me. This is something that I knew was going to manifest anyways. It's happening. September 30, I'll be prepared." At the time of the fight announcement, Álvarez was also surprised he was not offered Jermall, as he was closer to his weight, however felt Jermell was the superior boxer, with the better resume. During the two-city press tour, Charlo was respectful towards Álvarez, which came to a shock, as Charlo was usually confrontational towards his past opponents. Álvarez appreciated this and said it showed that there does not need to be controversy to sell a fight. For Charlo, it would be 16-months out of the ring, by the time the fight took place. On the previous hand injury, Charlo said there was no issues. For this fight, Álvarez moved his full training camp to Lake Tahoe, a high-altitude location, rather than his usual camp which takes place in San Diego. Álvarez stated he preferred to be more isolated, and chose to settle in Truckee, which had a population of around 20,000 residents and 5,817 feet above sea level.

As always, the WBC announced the winner would receive the Puebla belt, a commemorative belt, created for the bout. During fight week, Showtime's Stephen Espinoza revealed the event was projected to exceed $20 million in ticket revenue. Both boxers weighed the same 167.4 pounds for the fight, a career-high for Charlo.

== The fight ==
Both fighters were cautious early, but from the second round Álvarez would largely control the pace the bout, backing Charlo into the ropes and landing heavy punches to the body. About minute into the 7th round, Álvarez sent Charlo on to his knee with a right hook and right uppercut. It was just the second time that Charlo had been knocked down in his career. Charlo beat the count but by this time, appeared to be focused on just trying to survive and see the final bell. Whenever Álvarez cut inside, Charlo moved out of range without engaging. At the end of 12 rounds, all three judges scored the bout for Álvarez with scores of 119–108, 118–109 and 118–109 giving him a unanimous decision victory. According to Compubox, Álvarez landed 134 of 385 punches thrown (35%) compared to Charlo, who landed 71 of his 398 thrown (18%). Both landed just one punch each in the opening round.

== Aftermath ==
During the post-fight interviews, Álvarez said, "Nobody can compete with this Canelo. Two months in the mountains [training near Lake Tahoe] without my family. I still love boxing. I love boxing so f---ing much. Boxing is my life. Boxing made me the person I am today." Charlo said, "I feel like it wasn't me in there. I don't make excuses. You win some, you lose some. I'm undisputed in my weight; I was daring to be great. I'm proud of myself. He didn't knock me out; he knocked all the other guys out." When asked who he would like to fight next, Álvarez replied, "Whoever. I don't f---ing care."

Álvarez was asked about Terence Crawford being a potential opponent in the future, to which he responded, “You know, I always say if the fight make sense, why not? But he is not in the plan. ... You know, like I say, if it makes sense, maybe. I don’t know right now. I just wanna enjoy this fight and please, let me enjoy this fight. And then you’re gonna know what is next for sure.”

== Reception ==
According to Dan Rafael, the PPV sold up to 700,000 units, generating $59,500,000 in revenue, which was in the top 3 PPV's for the year after Davis-Garcia sold 1.2 million and Spence-Crawford sold around 700,000 PPV's.

== Undercard ==
Confirmed bouts:

| Winner | Loser | Weight division/title belt(s) disputed | Result |
|---|---|---|---|
| (United States) Erickson Lubin | (United States) Jesus Ramos | Vacant WBC Diamond Super welterweight title | Unanimous decision |
| (United States) Mario Barrios | (Cuba) Yordenis Ugás | WBC Interim World Welterweight title | Unanimous decision |
| (United States) Elijah Garcia | (Mexico) Jose Armando Resendiz | Middleweight (10 rounds) | 8th-round TKO |
| (Cuba) Frank Sánchez | (United States) Scott Alexander | WBC Continental Americas Heavyweight title | 4th-round RTD |
| (United States) Terrell Gausha | (United States) KeAndrae Leatherwood | Middleweight (8 rounds) | Majority decision |
| (Ukraine) Oleksandr Gvozdyk | (Brazil) Isaac Rodrigues | Light heavyweight (8 rounds) | 2nd-round KO |
Preliminary bouts
| (Mexico) Gabriel Gollaz Valenzuela | (Colombia) Yeis Gabriel Solano | Super lightweight (8 rounds) | 6th-round KO |
| (Kazakhstan) Bek Nurmaganbet | (Nigeria) Abimbola Osundairo | Super middleweight (6 rounds) | 3rd-round TKO |
| (United States) Justin Viloria | (United States) Angel Barrera | Super featherweight (6 rounds) | Unanimous decision |
| (Kazakhstan) Abilkhan Amankul | (United States) Joeshon James | Middleweight (4 rounds) | Majority draw |
| (United States) Curmel Moton | (United States) Ezequiel Flores | Super featherweight (4 rounds) | 1st-round TKO |

== Broadcasting ==
| Country | Broadcaster |
|---|---|
| Panama | Telemetro |
| Ireland | DAZN |
| United States | Showtime |

| Preceded by vs. John Ryder | Canelo Álvarez's bouts 30 September 2023 | Succeeded by vs. Jaime Munguía |
| Preceded by vs. Brian Castaño II | Jermell Charlo's bouts 30 September 2023 | Succeeded by TBA |
