= Magomed Kurbanov =

Magomed Kurbanov may refer to:

- Magomed Kurbanov (boxer)
- Magomed Kurbanov (wrestler)
- Magomed Kurbanov (footballer)
