= Terrell Gausha =

American boxer (born 1987)

Personal information
- Nickname: Terrible
- Nationality: American
- Born: September 9, 1987 (age 38) Cleveland, Ohio, U.S.
- Height: 5 ft 10 in (178 cm)
- Weight: Light middleweight; Middleweight

Boxing career
- Reach: 72 in (183 cm)
- Stance: Orthodox

Boxing record
- Total fights: 31
- Wins: 24
- Win by KO: 12
- Losses: 6
- Draws: 1

Terrell Maurice Gausha (/təˈrɛl ɡəˈʃeɪ/ tə-REL gə-SHAY; born September 9, 1987) is an American professional boxer who challenged for the World Boxing Association (WBA) super welterweight title in 2017. As an amateur he represented the United States at the 2012 Summer Olympics in the middleweight division.

== Early life and education ==
A 2005 graduate of Glenville High School in Cleveland, Ohio, Gausha has been boxing since the age of 10. He started boxing under coach Bob Davis at The Glenville Recreation Center. He was later coached by Renard Safo.

== Amateur career ==
After winning the USA National Title in 2009, Gausha competed in the 2009 World Amateur Boxing Championships and several international dual matches. Between 2010 and 2012, Gausha participated in the World Series of Boxing. His record in the World Series was 5–2.

On February 26, 2012 Gausha entered the USA Championship tournament in Colorado Springs, Colorado as an unseeded at-large entry. He upset the field, defeating a National Golden Gloves Champion (Jesse Hart), the #2 National Boxer and the previous #1 boxer. Gausha won 6 fights in a 7-day span. On March 3, 2012 he captured the USA National Championship by defeating the previous champion, Caleb Plant. Winners of the 2011 US Olympic trials who failed to qualify for the Olympic Tournament at the 2011 AIBA World Boxing Championships, like middleweight Jesse Hart, had to return to the 2012 US Championships to once again battle for the chance to represent Team USA. Winners of the 2012 US Championships would earn the opportunity to qualify for the Olympic field at the AIBA Olympic Qualifying Tournament for the Americas.

On May 9, 2012 Gausha won the quarterfinal match of the Americas Olympic Qualification Tournament in Rio de Janeiro, Brazil. That victory gave him a guaranteed berth in the 2012 Olympics. On May 13, 2012 he won the gold medal in the Americas Olympic Qualification Tournament, defeating Junior Castillo 6–2.

On July 28, 2012 Gausha won his first Olympic bout, defeating Armenian boxer Andranik Hakobyan, with a sensational knock out. However, he would be eliminated from the Olympics because of a controversial decision to India's Vijender Singh in his next bout.

== Professional career ==
On November 9, 2012 Gausha began his professional career by knocking out Dustin Caplinger during a show televised on ShoBox. Gausha was knocked down on his fourth professional fight by William Waters. Gausha won the four-round bout by unanimous decision (38-37, 38–37, 38–37).

On August 12, 2017 it was announced that Gausha would challenge WBA (Super) and IBO champion Erislandy Lara. The fight was part of a light middleweight triple header on October 14, 2017 at the Barclays Center in New York City. Other fights on the card included Jermell Charlo's mandatory title defence against top prospect Erickson Lubin and Jarrett Hurd defending his IBF title against former champion Austin Trout. Lara knocked down Gausha en route to a 12-round unanimous decision to retain his world titles. Lara used his accurate jab and left hand, putting on a clinic winning with the scorecards 116–111 and 117–110 twice in his favour. Due to lack of action, boos were heard from the crowd.

In his next fight, Gausha bounced back with an easy first-round TKO win against Joey Hernandez.

On May 25, 2019, Gausha, ranked No. 13 by the WBA, fought Austin Trout, who was ranked No. 6 by the WBC at the time. Gausha looked dominant throughout most of the fight, the announcers giving him a wide lead on the scorecards. The judges, however, saw it differently, with one judge scoring it 99-91 for Gausha, another judge scoring it 96-94 for Trout, and the third judge scoring it even, 95-95.

Gausha's following fight was a WBC super-welterweight title eliminator, against Erickson Lubin. The fight was not packed with a lot of action from both fighters, but Lubin's performance was more convincing as he managed to win most of the rounds. Lubin defeated Gausha comfortably on the scorecards, 118–110, 116-112 and 115–113.

Gausha fought Jamontay Clark on March 13, 2021. Gausha knocked him out in the second round.

=== WBC Middleweight Championship ===
==== Adames vs. Gausha ====
Gausha was scheduled to challenge Carlos Adames for his WBC middleweight title at MGM Grand Garden Arena in Las Vegas on June 15, 2024. He lost the fight by unanimous decision.

==== Gausha vs. Garcia ====
On January 3, 2025 it was reported that Gausha would face Elijah Garcia on February 15, 2025. Gausha lost the fight against Garcia by split decision on March 22, 2025 in Las Vegas.

==== Gausha vs. Garcia ====
Gausha faced Yoenlis Hernández for the vacant WBO-NABO middleweight title at the MGM Grand Garden Arena in Las Vegas on 28 March 2026. He lost by stoppage in the fourth round.

== Professional boxing record ==
31 fights	24 wins	6 losses
By knockout	12	1
By decision	12	5
Draws	1	

No.	Result	Record	Opponent	Type	Round, time	Date	Location	Notes
31	Loss	24–6–1	Yoenlis Hernández	TKO	4 (10), 1:17	Mar 28, 2026	MGM Grand Garden Arena, Paradise, Nevada, U.S.	For vacant WBO-NABO middleweight title
30	Loss	24–5–1	Elijah Garcia	SD	10	Mar 22, 2025	Michelob Ultra Arena, Paradise, Nevada, U.S.	
29	Loss	24–4–1	Carlos Adames	UD	12	Jun 15, 2024	MGM Grand Garden Arena, Paradise, Nevada, U.S.	For WBC middleweight title
28	Win	24–3–1	KeAndrae Leatherwood	MD	8	Sep 30, 2023	T-Mobile Arena, Las Vegas, Nevada, U.S.	
27	Win	23–3–1	Brandyn Lynch	KO	9 (10), 0:50	Mar 4, 2023	Toyota Arena, Ontario, California, U.S.	
26	Loss	22–3–1	Tim Tszyu	UD	12	Mar 26, 2022	Minneapolis Armory, Minneapolis, Minnesota, U.S.	
25	Win	22–2–1	Jamontay Clark	KO	2 (10), 2:27	Mar 13, 2021	Mohegan Sun Arena, Uncansville, Connecticut, U.S.	
24	Loss	21–2–1	Erickson Lubin	UD	12	Sep 19, 2020	Mohegan Sun Arena, Uncasville, Connecticut, U.S.	
23	Draw	21–1–1	Austin Trout	SD	10	May 25, 2019	Beau Rivage Resort Casino, Biloxi, Mississippi, U.S.	
22	Win	21–1	Joey Hernandez	TKO	1 (10), 2:51	Dec 22, 2018	Barclays Center, New York City, New York, U.S.	
21	Loss	20–1	Erislandy Lara	UD	12	Oct 14, 2017	Barclays Center, New York City, New York, U.S.	For WBA (Super) and IBO light middleweight titles
20	Win	20–0	Luis Hernandez	UD	10	Feb 10, 2017	Huntington Center, Toledo, Ohio, U.S.	
19	Win	19–0	Steven Martinez	MD	10	Aug 27, 2016	Honda Center, Anaheim, California, U.S.	
18	Win	18–0	Orlando Lora	RTD	7 (10), 3:00	Apr 30, 2016	StubHub Center, Carson, California, U.S.	
17	Win	17–0	Said El Harrak	UD	10	Dec 12, 2015	AT&T Center, San Antonio, Texas, U.S.	
16	Win	16–0	Eliezer Gonzalez	UD	8	Sep 26, 2015	Legacy Arena, Birmingham, Alabama, U.S.	
15	Win	15–0	Luis Grajeda	UD	8	Jun 20, 2015	MGM Grand Garden Arena, Paradise, Nevada, U.S.	
14	Win	14–0	Norberto Gonzalez	TKO	2 (8), 0:51	Mar 7, 2015	MGM Grand Garden Arena, Paradise, Nevada, U.S.	
13	Win	13–0	Cesar Vila	KO	8 (8), 2:30	Dec 11, 2014	Pechanga Resort & Casino, Temecula, California, U.S.	
12	Win	12–0	Juan Carlos Rojas	UD	6	Sep 6, 2014	U.S. Bank Arena, Cincinnati, Ohio, U.S.	
11	Win	11–0	Ronnie Warrior Jr.	KO	1 (8), 2:59	Jul 25, 2014	Fantasy Springs Casino, Indio, California, U.S.	
10	Win	10–0	James Winchester	UD	10	Jun 6, 2014	Fantasy Springs Casino, Indio, California, U.S.	
9	Win	9–0	Charles Whittaker	UD	8	Apr 26, 2014	StubHub Center, Carson, California, U.S.	
8	Win	8–0	George Sosa	UD	8	Feb 10, 2014	Cowboys Dance Hall, San Antonio, Texas, U.S.	
7	Win	7–0	Andres Calixto Rey	KO	1 (8), 1:50	Nov 11, 2013	Cowboys Dance Hall, San Antonio, Texas, U.S.	
6	Win	6–0	Bruce Runkle	TKO	1 (6), 2:48	Sep 12, 2013	MGM Grand Premier Ballroom, Paradise, Nevada, U.S.	
5	Win	5–0	Austin Marcum	KO	2 (6), 1:04	Aug 19, 2013	Best Buy Theater, New York City, New York, U.S.	
4	Win	4–0	William Waters	UD	4	Apr 20, 2013	Alamodome, San Antonio, Texas, U.S.	
3	Win	3–0	Lekan Byfield	UD	4	Feb 23, 2013	Masonic Temple Masonic Theater, Detroit, Michigan, U.S.	
2	Win	2–0	Kenneth Taylor Schmitz	TKO	1 (4), 1:42	Jan 12, 2013	BB&t Center, Sunrise, Florida, U.S.	
1	Win	1–0	Dustin Caplinger	KO	2 (4), 1:55	Nov 3, 2012	Fantasy Springs Casino, Indio, California, U.S.	
