= Jesse Hart =

American boxer (born 1989)

Personal information
- Nickname: Hard Work
- Born: August 14, 1989 (age 37) Philadelphia, Pennsylvania, U.S.
- Height: 6 ft 3 in (191 cm)
- Weight: Super middleweight Light heavyweight

Boxing career
- Reach: 77 1/2 in (197 cm)
- Stance: Orthodox

Boxing record
- Total fights: 33
- Wins: 30
- Win by KO: 24
- Losses: 3

Jesse Hart (born August 14, 1989) is an American professional boxer who has challenged twice for the WBO super middleweight title; firstly in 2017 and again in 2018.

== Early life and amateur career ==
Jesse Hart is the son of former Philly middleweight contender Eugene Hart. Eugene trains his son to this day. In 2011, Hart won the National Golden Gloves Championships, and the US National Championships at Middleweight. He was, at one time, the number one rated amateur boxer at Middleweight in the US. Hart failed to qualify to the 2012 Summer Olympics, losing to Terrell Gausha on countback at the final match of the US Olympic Trials. Hart accumulated an 85-11 record as an amateur.

== Professional career ==
=== Early career ===
Hart turned pro in June 2012, signing with promotional outfit Top Rank. Hart won his first 16 fights against mediocre opposition, with 13 wins coming by way of knockout. In May 2015, Hart fought Mike Jimenez in the undercard of Mayweather-Pacquiao. Hart won in dominant fashion, breaking Jimenez down before winning by technical knockout in round 6. With the win, Hart claimed the USBA and the NABO super middleweight titles. Hart defended his North American titles four times against the likes of Dashon Johnson and Andrew Hernandez. Johnson gave Hart an extremely tough fight, despite the former's 19-18-3 record going into the fight. Hart seemed to tire in the latter half of the fight and Johnson dropped Hart in the final round. In the end, Hart took the win by unanimous decision (98-91, 97-92, 95-94).

=== Ramírez vs. Hart ===
Jesse Hart reached an agreement to fight WBO world champion Gilberto Ramírez on September 22, 2017 in Tucson, Arizona. On August 22, the fight was made official and an announcement was made for the venue. The fight was to take place at the Convention Center.

In front of 4,103 fans, Ramírez retained his WBO super middleweight title in a hard-fought battle against a game Hart, which went the 12 round distance. The final judges scorecards were 115-112, 115-112, and 114-113 in favour of Ramírez. He started off strong, dropping Hart in round 2 following a left uppercut, which Hart did not see coming. Hart beat the count and survived the round. In round 4, Hart took tremendous punishment, but managed to stay on his feet. The last 6 rounds saw the fight turnaround in favour of Hart. He landed many power shots to the head of Ramírez, who held his own. Ramírez seemed to have tired out during the closing rounds. Round 11 saw Hart rock Ramírez badly, but not realizing that his legs had given way, thus failing to go for the finish. Had Hart not been dropped in round 2, the fight would have ended via majority decision. After the fight, Ramírez said, "This one was for all the Dreamers, all the people of Mexico and what they are going through with the earthquake. The plan was push, push, push and put a lot of pressure on him and keep him off balance. I wanted to put on a really big body attack every round. There was nothing easy in this fight." Hart was humble in defeat, "I take nothing away from him. He's a good champ. He has my respect. The knockdown was my fault. Zurdo's a really good fighter." Ramírez landed 220 punches from 690 thrown (32%), this included 40 of his 70 power shots thrown. Hart landed 132 of his 497 thrown (27%).

On December 14, 2018, Hart faced Ramirez in a rematch for the WBO super middleweight title. Ramirez was punishing Hart throughout the fight, especially being efficient on the inside. Hart was able to hurt Ramirez back in the final round, but it was too late to make any significant impact on the scoring. In the end, Ramirez won the fight via majority decision, with two judges seeing Ramirez as the winner, 115-113 and 115-113, and one scoring the fight a draw, 114-114.

In his next fight, Hart battled veteran Sullivan Barrera. In what was his debut at light heavyweight, Hart managed to secure a win on points. It was a dirty fight in which referee Jay Nady had to intervene multiple times and threaten the boxers with a point deduction.

== Professional boxing record ==
31 fights	28 wins	3 losses
By knockout	22	0
By decision	6	3

No.	Result	Record	Opponent	Type	Round, time	Date	Location	Notes
31	Win	28–3	(United States) David Murray	TKO	3 (8), 2:20	Dec 11, 2021	(United States) 2300 Arena, Philadelphia, Pennsylvania, U.S.	
30	Win	27–3	(United States) Mike Guy	UD	8	Sep 17, 2021	(United States) 2300 Arena, Philadelphia, Pennsylvania, U.S.	
29	Loss	26–3	(United States) Joe Smith Jr.	SD	10	Jan 11, 2020	(United States) Hard Rock Hotel & Casino, Atlantic City, New Jersey, U.S.	
28	Win	26–2	(Cuba) Sullivan Barrera	UD	10	Jun 15, 2019	(United States) MGM Grand Garden Arena, Paradise, Nevada, US	
27	Loss	25–2	(Mexico) Gilberto Ramirez	MD	12	Dec 14, 2018	(United States) Corpus Christi, Texas, U.S.	For WBO super middleweight title
26	Win	25–1	(United States) Mike Gavronski	TKO	3 (10), 0:52	Aug 18, 2018	(United States) Ocean Resort Casino, Atlantic City, U.S	Retained NABF super middleweight title
25	Win	24–1	(United States) Demond Nicholson	TKO	7 (10), 2:26	Apr 28, 2018	(United States) Liacouras Center, Philadelphia, U.S	Won vacant NABF super middleweight title
24	Win	23–1	(Ghana) Thomas Awimbono	TKO	1 (10), 1:28	Feb 3, 2018	(United States) Bank of America Center, Corpus Christi, U.S.	
23	Loss	22–1	(Mexico) Gilberto Ramírez	UD	12	Sep 22, 2017	(United States) Convention Center, Tucson, Arizona, U.S.	For WBO super middleweight title
22	Win	22–0	(Mexico) Alan Campa	TKO	5 (10), 0:44	Apr 8, 2017	(United States) MGM National Harbor, National Harbor, Maryland, U.S.	Retained USBA and NABO super middleweight titles
21	Win	21–0	(United States) Andrew Hernandez	TKO	3 (10), 1:59	Nov 4, 2016	(United States) Treasure Island Casino, Paradise, Nevada, U.S.	Retained USBA and NABO super middleweight titles
20	Win	20–0	(United States) Dashon Johnson	UD	10	Mar 18, 2016	(United States) 2300 Arena, Philadelphia, Pennsylvania, U.S.	Retained USBA and NABO super middleweight titles
19	Win	19–0	(Mexico) Andrik Saralegui	TKO	1 (8), 0:54	Dec 12, 2015	(United States) Convention Center, Tucson, Arizona, U.S.	
18	Win	18–0	(United States) Aaron Pryor Jr.	TKO	9 (10), 2:51	Sep 11, 2015	(United States) Cosmopolitan of Las Vegas, Paradise, Nevada, U.S.	Retained USBA and NABO super middleweight titles
17	Win	17–0	(United States) Mike Jimenez	TKO	6 (10), 2:13	May 2, 2015	(United States) MGM Grand Garden Arena, Las Vegas, Nevada, U.S.	Retained NABF junior super middleweight title Won vacant USBA and vacant NABO super middleweight titles
16	Win	16–0	(Colombia) Samuel Miller	TKO	2 (8), 2:07	Dec 13, 2014	(United States) 2300 Arena, Philadelphia, Pennsylvania, U.S.	
15	Win	15–0	(Puerto Rico) Roberto Acevedo	KO	4 (8), 1:15	Oct 4, 2014	(United States) Bally's Atlantic City, Atlantic City, New Jersey, U.S.	
14	Win	14–0	(United States) Shujaa El Amin	TKO	6 (8), 1:36	Jun 14, 2014	(United States) Bally's Atlantic City, Atlantic City, New Jersey, U.S.	
13	Win	13–0	(United States) Samuel Clarkson	UD	8	Apr 11, 2014	(United States) Mandalay Bay Events Center, Paradise, Nevada, U.S.	
12	Win	12–0	(United States) Derrick Findley	UD	6	Jan 25, 2014	(United States) Madison Square Garden, New York, New York, U.S.	
11	Win	11–0	(United States) Tyrell Hendrix	TKO	1 (6), 1:20	Dec 7, 2013	(United States) Boardwalk Hall, Atlantic City, New Jersey, U.S.	
10	Win	10–0	(United States) Terrence Wilson	KO	1 (4), 1:57	Sep 28, 2013	(United States) Bally's Event Center, Atlantic City, U.S.	
9	Win	9–0	(United States) Steven Tyner	TKO	1 (6), 1:20	Aug 10, 2013	(United States) Texas Station Casino, Las Vegas, U.S.	
8	Win	8–0	(United States) Eddie Hunter	TKO	2 (6), 1:17	Jul 12, 2013	(United States) Bally's Event Center, Atlantic City, U.S.	
7	Win	7–0	(United States) Thomas Turner	TKO	1 (6), 2:15	Jun 1, 2013	(United States) Radio City Music Hall, New York, U.S.	
6	Win	6–0	(United States) Marlon Farr	TKO	3 (6), 1:33	Apr 13, 2013	(United States) Temple University McGonigle Hall, Philadelphia, U.S.	
5	Win	5–0	(United States) Steven Tyner	UD	4	Dec 8, 2012	(United States) Wynn Resort, Las Vegas, U.S.	
4	Win	4–0	(United States) Joshua Meyers	TKO	3 (4), 2:01	Nov 10, 2012	(United States) Harrah's Philadelphia, Chester, U.S.	
3	Win	3–0	(United States) Lekan Byfield	KO	1 (4), 0:48	Sep 14, 2012	(United States) Boardwalk Hall, Atlantic City, New Jersey, U.S.	
2	Win	2–0	(United States) Steven Chadwick	TKO	1 (4), 2:38	Jul 7, 2012	(United States) Bally's Atlantic City, Atlantic City, U.S.	
1	Win	1–0	(United States) Manuel Eastman	TKO	1 (4), 0:33	Jun 9, 2012	(United States) MGM Grand, Grand Garden Arena, Las Vegas, U.S.	
