= Michel Soro =

Ivorian-French boxer (born 1987)

Personal information
- Nationality: (France) French
- Born: Michel Soro; 30 October 1987 (age 39) Abidjan, Ivory Coast
- Height: 5 ft 10 1/2 in (179 cm)
- Weight: Light middleweight; Middleweight

Boxing career
- Reach: 70 in (178 cm)
- Stance: Orthodox

Boxing record
- Total fights: 45
- Wins: 39
- Win by KO: 28
- Losses: 4
- Draws: 2

Michel Soro (born 30 October 1987) is an Ivorian-French professional boxer. He has held the IBO middleweight title since June 2026. Soro also challenged for the WBO and IBO light middleweight titles in 2012, and the WBA interim super welterweight title in 2017. At regional level, he has held the EBU European middleweight title, the WBO European junior middleweight title twice, and the WBA International super welterweight title.

== Professional career ==
In 2017, he challenged Brian Castaño for the interim WBA Jr. Middleweight title, losing by split decision.

In his next fight, Soro bounced back with a third round stoppage against Ivan Montero. He was the aggressor from the opening bell, and managed to drop his opponent in the third round, who was not able to beat the count with 1:53 left on the clock.

On 8 December 2018, Soro got an easy stoppage win over American Greg Vendetti.

After that fight, Soro was scheduled to a rematch against Brian Castano. However, the fight fell through, with Castano's team alleging that Soro's team did not want to deposit Castano's purse, nor provide evidence of VADA testing.

On 15 November 2019, Soro continued his dominant streak, with another one-sided victory, this time against French veteran Cedric Vitu. Soro's aggression throughout the fight culminated with a left hook to Vitu's temple in the fifth round, which sent Vitu on the canvas and forced the referee to stop the fight.

Soro fought Hassan Mwakinyo for the vacant IBO middleweight title in Abidjan, Ivory Coast on 10 June 2026. He won by technical knockout in the ninth round.

He is scheduled to make the first defense of his IBO middleweight title against unbeaten English boxer George Liddard at Salle des Étoiles in Monte Carlo, Monaco, on 12 December 2026.

== Professional boxing record ==
45 fights	39 wins	4 losses
By knockout	28	1
By decision	11	3
Draws	2	

No.	Result	Record	Opponent	Type	Round, time	Date	Location	Notes
45	Win	39–4–2	Hassan Mwakinyo	TKO	9 (12), 1:57	10 Jun 2026	Abidjan, Ivory Coast	Won vacant IBO middleweight title
44	Win	38–4–2	Evander Castillo	TKO	5 (10)	10 Oct 2025	Palais des Sports, Marseille, Bouches-du-Rhône, France	
43	Win	37–4–2	Asis Rodriguez Garcia	TKO	4 (8)	14 June 2025	Concession BMW Metz-Epagny, Annecy, France	
42	Win	36–4–2	Oziel Santoyo	KO	2 (10)	31 May 2024	Palais des Sports de Gerland, Lyon, France	
41	Loss	35–4–2	Magomed Kurbanov	SD	12	6 May 2023	KRK Uralets, Ekaterinburg, Russia	
40	Draw	35–3–2	Israil Madrimov	TD	3 (12), 2:20	9 Jul 2022	The O2 Arena, London, United Kingdom	
39	Loss	35–3–1	Israil Madrimov	TKO	9 (12), 3:00	17 Dec 2021	Hotel Renaissance, Tashkent, Uzbekistan	
38	Win	35–2–1	Cédric Vitu	TKO	5 (12), 2:03	15 Nov 2019	Accor Hotel Arena, Paris, France	
37	Win	34–2–1	Anderson Prestot	TKO	5 (12), 2:48	20 Jul 2019	Palais des Sports, Marseille, France	Won WBA Gold light middleweight title
36	Win	33–2–1	Greg Vendetti	TKO	2 (12), 2:34	8 Dec 2018	Palais des sports Marcel Cerdan, Levallois-Perret, France	
35	Win	32–2–1	John Vera	UD	12	24 Mar 2018	Palais des Sports, Marseille, France	
34	Win	31–2–1	Ivan Montero	KO	3 (10), 1:53	2 Dec 2017	La Palestre, Le Cannet, France	
33	Loss	30–2–1	Brian Castaño	SD	12	1 Jul 2017	Casino d'Evian, Evian-les-Bains, France	For WBA interim light middleweight title
32	Win	30–1–1	Javier Francisco Maciel	TKO	3 (12), 2:29	22 Apr 2017	Astroballe, Villeurbanne, France	Retained WBA International light middleweight title
31	Win	29–1–1	Nuhu Lawal	KO	10 (12), 1:17	17 Dec 2016	Stade de l'Est, Saint-Denis, France	Retained WBA International light middleweight title
30	Win	28–1–1	Hector Saldivia	TKO	3 (12)	30 Jul 2016	La Palestre, Le Cannet, France	Won WBA International light middleweight title
29	Win	27–1–1	Emanuele Blandamura	KO	8 (12), 2:12	20 Jun 2015	Teatro Principe, Milan, Italy	Won vacant European middleweight title
28	Win	26–1–1	Glen Tapia	TKO	4 (10), 2:10	8 May 2015	Prudential Center, Newark, New Jersey, U.S.	
27	Win	25–1–1	Anderson Clayton	KO	2 (8)	6 Mar 2015	Gymnase Mado Bonnet, Lyon, France	
26	Win	24–1–1	Sandor Micsko	KO	1 (10)	30 Jan 2015	Salle Polyvalente des Ramiers, Blagnac, France	
25	Draw	23–1–1	Antoine Douglas	MD	10	25 Jul 2014	Turning Stone Resort & Casino, Verona, New York, U.S.	For WBA International middleweight title
24	Win	23–1	Alexey Ribchev	KO	5 (8)	7 May 2014	Salle Raphael de Barros, Villeurbanne, France	
23	Win	22–1	Jean Michel Hamilcaro	UD	10	9 Nov 2013	Salle René-Tys, Reims, France	
22	Win	21–1	Frederic Serre	UD	10	4 May 2013	Salle Raphael de Barros, Villeurbanne, France	
21	Win	20–1	Kris Carslaw	UD	12	12 Jan 2013	La Palestre, Le Cannet, France	Won WBO European light middleweight title
20	Win	19–1	Magomed Abdurakhmanov	KO	1 (12)	13 Jul 2012	Palais des Sports Robert Oubron, Creteil, France	
19	Loss	18–1	Zaurbek Baysangurov	UD	12	12 May 2012	Ice Palace "Terminal", Brovary, Ukraine	For WBO and IBO light middleweight titles
18	Win	18–0	Sergei Melis	TKO	6 (10)	12 Nov 2011	Maison des sports, Villeurbanne, France	
17	Win	17–0	Albert Starikov	KO	6 (8)	15 Oct 2011	Halle Clemenceau, Grenoble, France	
16	Win	16–0	David Makaradze	UD	12	29 Jul 2011	Casino du Lyon vert, La Tour-de-Salvagny, France	Won WBO European light middleweight title
15	Win	15–0	Jurijs Boreiko	TKO	2 (8)	7 May 2011	Salle Jacques Anquetil, Venissieux, France	
14	Win	14–0	Giorgi Ungiadze	TKO	6 (8)	2 Apr 2011	La Palestre, Le Cannet, France	
13	Win	13–0	Roman Dzhuman	TKO	4 (10)	12 Feb 2011	Maison des sports, Villeurbanne, France	
12	Win	12–0	Tadas Jonkus	TKO	4 (8)	13 Nov 2010	Salle Raphael de Barros, Villeurbanne, France	
11	Win	11–0	Ahmed Merichiche	KO	2 (6)	19 Jul 2010	Salle Francois Mauriac, Vaulx-en-Velin, France	
10	Win	10–0	Anthony Somarriba	PTS	6	29 May 2010	Gymnase Massot, Le Puy-en-Velay, France	
9	Win	9–0	Robert Blazo	TKO	7 (8)	17 Apr 2010	Palais des sports Jean Capievic, Vaulx-en-Velin, France	
8	Win	8–0	Hakim Rouassi	PTS	8	27 Feb 2010	Salle Raphael de Barros, Villeurbanne, France	
7	Win	7–0	Jonathan Bertonnier	TKO	2 (6)	9 Jan 2010	Salle Raphael de Barros, Villeurbanne, France	
6	Win	6–0	Ousmane Kone	PTS	6	4 Apr 2009	Salle Raphael de Barros, Villeurbanne, France	
5	Win	5–0	Ibamata Sidibe	PTS	6	14 Mar 2009	Jacques Anquetil, Venissieux, France	
4	Win	4–0	Kevin Mpiga	PTS	4	27 Feb 2009	Salle La Cotonne, Saint-Etienne, France	
3	Win	3–0	Jeremy Facq	TKO	1 (4)	14 Feb 2009	Salle Maurice Herzog, Oullins, France	
2	Win	2–0	Sebastien Allais	PTS	4	11 Dec 2008	Cirque d'Hiver, Paris, France	
1	Win	1–0	Said Moulkraloua	TKO	3 (4)	2 Oct 2008	Cirque d'Hiver, Paris, France	
