= Amílcar Vidal =

Uruguayan boxer

Personal information
- Nickname: Pety
- Born: Amílcar Vidal Jr. 26 February 1996 (age 30) Montevideo, Uruguay
- Height: 1.83 m (6 ft 0 in)
- Weight: Middleweight

Boxing career
- Reach: 189 cm (74 in)
- Stance: Orthodox

Boxing record
- Total fights: 18
- Wins: 17
- Win by KO: 13
- Losses: 1

Amílcar Vidal Jr. (born 26 February 1996) is an Uruguayan professional boxer who has held the WBC Latino middleweight title since 2019.

== Early life ==
Vidal was born on 26 February 1996 in Montevideo, growing up in the Unión neighborhood of the city. His father, also named Amílcar, was an amateur boxer in the 1960s and opened his own gym in 2010. His older brothers, Richard and Alejandro, boxed as well, inspiring Amílcar Jr. to enter the ring at age five.

As an amateur, Vidal made his debut at the age of 16 in Brazil and had 60 bouts.

== Professional career ==
Vidal made his professional debut on 14 April 2018, knocking out compatriot Rodrigo Ferrari in Mercedes, Uruguay. On 26 January 2019, he stopped an undefeated Carlos Capelari with a hook to the liver in the first round of their bout in Montevideo to win the vacant WBC FECONSUR middleweight title. Vidal retained the belt with an eighth-round technical knockout (TKO) win over Martín Bulacio in Buenos Aires that May. On 3 August 2019, he defeated Nicolás Luque Palacios via unanimous decision at the Palacio Peñarol in Montevideo to win the vacant WBC Latino middleweight title, with the judges' scorecards reading 99–91, 97–93 and 96–94. It was Vidal's first fight to go the distance, ending his streak of eight consecutive stoppage victories. He ended the year by making his U.S. debut against fellow undefeated contender Zach Prieto on a ShoBox card at the WinnaVegas Casino Resort in Sloan, Iowa. Vidal floored Prieto twice early on, forcing referee Mark Nelson to wave off the fight with one second remaining in the first round. After another first-round TKO win over an undefeated Leopoldo Reyna, he knocked out an undefeated Edward Ortiz in two rounds at the Staples Center in Los Angeles.

On 17 July 2021, Vidal went the distance with Immanuwel Aleem, scoring a majority decision victory over the American veteran on the undercard of the Jermell Charlo vs. Brian Castaño world title unification bout at the AT&T Center in San Antonio, Texas. WBC president Mauricio Sulaimán said that Vidal "had a sensational fight, in which he proved to be a real prospect, worthy of being ranked highly." On 29 December 2021, he defeated Martín Bulacio in a rematch via unanimous decision (99–91, 97–93, 96–94) to retain his WBC Latino middleweight title, improving his record to 14–0.

== Personal life ==
Vidal temporarily moved to Mexico in 2016 to train and continue his amateur career. He was run over by a truck while jogging in the State of Mexico, spending over two months in the hospital. Vidal suffered a broken pelvis and had to undergo surgery on his left arm, being told he would never walk again.

Vidal's father and trainer, Amílcar Sr., died about a month after his win over Immanuwel Aleem in 2021.

== Professional boxing record ==
17 fights	16 wins	1 loss
By knockout	12	1
By decision	4	0

No.	Result	Record	Opponent	Type	Round, time	Date	Location	Notes
17	Loss	16–1	(United States) Elijah Garcia	KO	4 (10), 2:17	4 Mar 2023	(United States) Toyota Arena, Ontario, California, US	Lost WBC Latino middleweight title
16	Win	16–0	(Argentina) Gabriel Omar Diaz	UD	10	29 Jul 2022	Estadio American Box, Montevideo, Uruguay	Retained WBC Latino middleweight title
15	Win	15–0	(Paraguay) Osmar Gustavo Dominguez Chamorro	TKO	2 (10), 1:22	2 Apr 2022	Polideportivo Municipal Roberto De Vicenzo, Berazategui, Argentina	Retained WBC Latino middleweight title
14	Win	14–0	(Argentina) Martín Bulacio	UD	10	29 Dec 2021	Polideportivo Municipal Roberto De Vicenzo, Berazategui, Argentina	Retained WBC Latino middleweight title
13	Win	13–0	(United States) Immanuwel Aleem	MD	10	17 Jul 2021	(United States) AT&T Center, San Antonio, Texas, U.S.	
12	Win	12–0	(United States) Edward Ortiz	KO	2 (10), 1:58	14 Nov 2020	(United States) Staples Center, Los Angeles, California, U.S.	
11	Win	11–0	(Mexico) Leopoldo Reyna	TKO	1 (10)	4 Jan 2020	Radisson Victoria Plaza, Montevideo, Uruguay	
10	Win	10–0	(United States) Zach Prieto	TKO	1 (8), 2:59	15 Nov 2019	(United States) WinnaVegas Casino Resort, Sloan, Iowa, U.S.	
9	Win	9–0	(Argentina) Nicolás Luque Palacios	UD	10	3 Aug 2019	Palacio Peñarol, Montevideo, Uruguay	Won vacant WBC Latino middleweight title
8	Win	8–0	(Argentina) Martín Bulacio	TKO	8 (10)	10 May 2019	Estadio F.A.B., Buenos Aires, Argentina	Retained WBC FECONSUR middleweight title
7	Win	7–0	(Argentina) Carlos Capelari	KO	1 (10)	26 Jan 2019	Radisson Victoria Plaza, Montevideo, Uruguay	Won vacant WBC FECONSUR middleweight title
6	Win	6–0	(Argentina) Pablo Sergio Pastor	KO	2 (6), 1:09	24 Nov 2018	Club Atlético Rentistas, Montevideo, Uruguay	
5	Win	5–0	(Argentina) Walter Dario Lizardo	TKO	1 (4)	20 Oct 2018	Estadio F.A.B., Buenos Aires, Argentina	
4	Win	4–0	(Argentina) Genaro Daniel Nozzi	KO	2 (4), 1:13	11 Aug 2018	Fronton del Campus Municipal, Maldonado, Uruguay	
3	Win	3–0	(Argentina) Marcelo Marcos Madrid	TKO	1 (4), 1:17	16 Jun 2018	Pabellón de las Rosas, Piriápolis, Uruguay	
2	Win	2–0	(Argentina) Jonathan David Mason	KO	1 (4), 1:50	12 May 2018	Fronton del Campus Municipal, Maldonado, Uruguay	
1	Win	1–0	(Uruguay) Rodrigo Ferrari	KO	2 (4)	14 Apr 2018	Club de Remeros Mercedes, Mercedes, Uruguay	
