= Jesus Ramos =

American boxer (born 2001)

Personal information
- Nicknames: El Mono ("The Monkey")
- Born: Jesus Alejandro Ramos Jr; March 7, 2001 (age 25) Casa Grande, Arizona, U.S.
- Height: 5 ft 10 in (178 cm)
- Weight: Light middleweight; Middleweight

Boxing career
- Reach: 72 in (183 cm)
- Stance: Southpaw

Boxing record
- Total fights: 25
- Wins: 24
- Win by KO: 19
- Losses: 1

Jesus Alejandro Ramos Jr. (born March 7, 2001) is a Mexican-American professional boxer, who has held the interim WBC middleweight title since December 2025.

== Professional career ==
Ramos turned pro in 2018 and compiled a record of 20-0 before losing a controversial decision to Erickson Lubin in an eliminator for the WBA light middleweight title.

Ramos was scheduled to face Johan Gonzalez at T-Mobile Arena in Las Vegas on May 4, 2024. Ramos won the fight by TKO in the ninth round.

Ramos was scheduled to face Jeison Rosario in a 10-round super welterweight bout at T-Mobile Arena in Las Vegas on February 1, 2025. Ramos won the fight by TKO in the eighth round.

Ramos was scheduled to face Kevin Salgado in a 10-round super welterweight bout at Michelob Ultra Arena in Las Vegas on March 22, 2025. On March 10, 2025 it was announced that Salgado was replaced by Guido Emmanuel Schramm. Ramos defeated Schramm by TKO in the seventh round.

== Professional boxing record ==
25 fights	24 wins	1 loss
By knockout	19	0
By decision	5	1

No.	Result	Record	Opponent	Type	Round, time	Date	Location	Notes
25	Win	24–1	Shane Mosley Jr.	UD	12	Dec 6, 2025	Frost Bank Center, San Antonio, Texas, U.S.	Won interim WBC middleweight title
24	Win	23–1	Guido Emmanuel Schramm	TKO	7 (10), 1:38	Mar 22, 2025	Michelob Ultra Arena, Nevada, U.S.	
23	Win	22–1	Jeison Rosario	TKO	8 (10), 2:18	Feb 1, 2025	T-Mobile Arena, Paradise, Nevada, U.S.	
22	Win	21–1	Johan Gonzalez	TKO	9 (10), 2:56	May 4, 2024	T-Mobile Arena, Paradise, Nevada, U.S.	
21	Loss	20–1	Erickson Lubin	UD	12	Sep 30, 2023	T-Mobile Arena, Paradise, Nevada, U.S.	
20	Win	20–0	Joseph Spencer	TKO	7 (10), 1:25	Mar 25, 2023	MGM Grand Garden Arena, Paradise, Nevada, U.S.	
19	Win	19–0	Luke Santamaria	UD	10	May 28, 2022	Barclays Center, New York City, New York, U.S.	
18	Win	18–0	Vladimir Hernandez	TKO	6 (10), 2:21	Feb 5, 2022	Michelob Ultra Arena, Paradise, Nevada, U.S.	Won vacant WBC USA Silver light-middleweight title
17	Win	17–0	Brian Mendoza	UD	10	Sep 5, 2021	Armory, Minneapolis, Minnesota, U.S.	
16	Win	16–0	Javier Molina	UD	10	May 1, 2021	Dignity Health Sports Park, Carson, California, U.S.	
15	Win	15–0	Jesus Emilio Bojorquez	KO	2 (10), 1:44	Feb 27, 2021	Shrine Exposition Center, Los Angeles, California, U.S.	
14	Win	14–0	Naim Nelson	RTD	4 (10), 3:00	Dec 26, 2020	Shrine Exposition Center, Los Angeles, California, U.S.	
13	Win	13–0	Esteban Garcia	KO	2 (8), 2:45	Sep 6, 2020	Microsoft Theater, Los Angeles, California, U.S.	
12	Win	12–0	Ramal Amanov	RTD	6 (8), 3:00	Feb 1, 2020	Beau Rivage Resort & Casino, Biloxi, Mississippi, U.S.	
11	Win	11–0	Rickey Edwards	KO	3 (8), 2:40	Sep 21, 2019	Rabobank Theater, Bakersfield, California, U.S.	
10	Win	10–0	Kevin Shacks	UD	4	Jun 23, 2019	Mandalay Bay, Paradise, Nevada, U.S.	
9	Win	9–0	Seifullah Jihad Wise	KO	1 (6), 1:27	Apr 27, 2019	Celebrity Theatre, Phoenix, Arizona, U.S.	
8	Win	8–0	Ivan Chavela Resendiz	KO	2 (6), 2:26	Feb 22, 2019	Cheer's Bar, Tijuana, Baja California, Mexico	
7	Win	7–0	Rodolfo Lopez Alvarez	RTD	2 (6), 3:00	Dec 14, 2018	Polideportivo Juan S. Millan, Culiacan, Sinaloa, Mexico	
6	Win	6–0	Hugo Montoya	TKO	1 (6), 1:54	Oct 26, 2018	Cheer's Bar, Tijuana, Baja California, Mexico	
5	Win	5–0	Jose Vergara Grajeda	KO	1 (6), 1:24	Oct 5, 2018	Big Punch Arena, Tijuana, Baja California, Mexico	
4	Win	4–0	Jose Roberto Gracia	TKO	2 (4), 1:23	Sep 1, 2018	Cheer's Bar, Tijuana, Baja California, Mexico	
3	Win	3–0	Miguel Robinson Salmeron	KO	2 (6), 2:33	Aug 18, 2018	Gimnasio Municipal, Puerto Penasco, Sonora, Mexico	
2	Win	2–0	Martin Sosa	TKO	2 (4), 1:59	Jun 29, 2018	CUM Aguaprieta, Agua Prieta, Sonora, Mexico	
1	Win	1–0	Luis Romero	TKO	1 (4), 1:28	May 26, 2018	CUM Aguaprieta, Agua Prieta, Sonora, Mexico	

== Personal life ==
Ramos's uncle Abel Ramos is also a professional boxer.

== See also ==
- List of male boxers
- List of southpaw stance boxers

Sporting positions
Regional boxing titles
Vacant Title last held by Greg Vendetti	WBC USA Silver light-middleweight champion February 5, 2022 – 2022; Vacated	Vacant Title next held by Jose Cirilo Terrazas
World boxing titles
Vacant Title last held by Carlos Adames	WBC middleweight champion Interim title December 6, 2025 – pressnt	Incumbent
