= Brian Castaño =

Argentine boxer

Personal information
- Nickname: El Boxi
- Born: 12 September 1989 (age 37) Isidro Casanova, Argentina
- Height: 5 ft 6.5 in (169 cm)
- Weight: Light middleweight

Boxing career
- Reach: 68 in (173 cm)
- Stance: Orthodox

Boxing record
- Total fights: 20
- Wins: 17
- Win by KO: 12
- Losses: 1
- Draws: 2
Medal record
Representing Argentina
South American Games
Gold medal – first place	2010 Medellin	Welterweight

Brian Carlos Castaño (born 12 September 1989) is an Argentine professional boxer. He held the WBO light middleweight title between 2021 and 2022 and previously held the WBA interim light middleweight title from 2016 to 2018, and the WBA (Regular) light middleweight title from 2018 to 2019.

== Early life and amateur career ==
Castaño started boxing at 11, trained by his father Carlos, who was also a professional boxer. Castaño won a South American Games gold medal and tallied a 181–5–5 record as an amateur, with wins over Errol Spence Jr. and Esquiva Falcão. Castaño participated in the 2009 World Amateur Boxing Championships, winning his first two bout before losing to Jack Culcay-Keth. He also represented Argentina in the World Series of Boxing. Castaño accumulated a 3–0 record in the World Series, including a famous win over Sergiy Derevyanchenko, who had previously been unbeaten in the competition.

== Professional career ==
=== Early career ===
Castaño made his professional debut in September 2012, months after his win over Derevianchenko. He beat Alejandro Antonio Dominguez with a round 4 technical knockout at Luna Park. Castaño won his first 8 fights, 7 by way of knockout, before being sidelined due to an arrhytmia which caused several medical complications. After recovering, Castaño relocated to the United States. Castaño maintained his winning streak, winning four fights over the course of a year while fighting out of the U.S.

=== Rise up the ranks ===
In November 2016, Castaño fought Emmanuel de Jesús for the WBA interim super welterweight title. After knocking De Jesús down on round 1 with a flurry of punches, Castaño went down at the beginning of round 2, following a cross from De Jesús. Castaño survived the round and as the fight went on, De Jesús started slowing down. Castaño eventually won the fight with a body shot towards the end of round 6.

Castaño stepped up against former world title challenger and long-time contender, Michel Soro. Castaño won a close fight by split decision (115–113, 115–113, 112–116). The judges seemed to prefer Castaño's activity and consistency over Soro's calculated pressure, who admitted he had started slow in a post-fight interview. Two months after the fight, Castaño said that Soro's promoter, Univent, had yet to pay most of his purse.

=== WBA (Regular) light middleweight champion ===
==== Castaño vs. Vitu ====
After Demetrius Andrade vacated his WBA (Regular) title, the WBA elevated Castaño to regular champion. Shortly thereafter, the WBA ordered a fight between Castaño and WBA (Super) champion, Erislandy Lara. Castaño would first face Cedric Vitu on 10 March 2018. Castaño showcased his talent, and defeated Vitu via a 12th-round TKO, dominating him from start to finish to retain his WBA (Regular) title.

==== Castaño vs. Lara ====
On 2 March 2019, Castaño defended his title against former world champion Erislandy Lara. The fight ended in a split draw, one judge scoring it 115–113 for Castaño, one judge scoring it 115–113 for Lara while the third had it 114–114.

On June 25, 2019, the WBA announced that they are stripping Castaño of his belt, because he did not sign the contract for a rematch against Cedric Vitu, his immediate mandatory challenger.

In his next fight, Castaño faced veteran Wale Omotoso. The fight was a one-sided affair in favor of Castaño, up until the end of the fifth round, in which Omotoso declared a shoulder injury was too painful to proceed, awarding Castaño with the victory.

=== WBO light middleweight champion ===
==== Castaño vs. Teixeira ====
On 13 February 2021, Castaño defeated WBO light middleweight champion Patrick Teixeira via wide unanimous decision with judges' scores of 119–109, 120–108 and 117–111 in his favor.

==== Castaño vs. Charlo ====
Castaño faced unified light middleweight champion Jermell Charlo on 17 July 2021 in San Antonio, Texas in a showdown for the undisputed light middleweight championship. A competitive fight between them ended in a split draw, the second of Castaño's career, with scores of 117–111 Charlo, 114–113 Castaño and 114–114 even. The result was controversial, with much attention being brought to judge Nelson Vazquez's 117–111 Charlo card, which was described as "terrible" by Andre Ward. After the fight, an upset Castaño opined, "[Charlo] won the second, tenth and eleventh [rounds], that’s it... I don’t agree with [the result]. I felt I was robbed, and I demand a rematch."

==== Castaño vs. Charlo II ====
On November 27, 2021, it was revealed by ESPN that Castaño and Charlo had agreed to face each other in a rematch. The fight was officially announced on February 8, 2022, and was supposed to take place on March 19. Castaño was forced to withdraw on February 17 however, after suffering a slight biceps tear during training camp. A day later, the WBO ordered Castaño to show cause as to why Charlo should't be rescheduled to make an overdue mandatory title defense against Tim Tszyu. The fight was granted sanctioning approval by the WBO on May 3, under the condition that it takes place by May 14. The bout was officially announced for May 14, 2022, and took place at the Dignity Health Sports Park in Carson, California. He lost by 10th-round knockout after being knocked down twice. He was down on all three of the judges' scorecards at the time of the stoppage, with scores of 84–87, 83–88 and 82–89.

== Professional boxing record ==
20 fights	17 wins	1 loss
By knockout	12	1
By decision	4	0
By disqualification	1	0
Draws	2	

No.	Result	Record	Opponent	Type	Round, time	Date	Location	Notes
20	Loss	17–1–2	Jermell Charlo	KO	10 (12), 2:33	14 May 2022	Dignity Health Sports Park, Carson, California, U.S.	Lost WBO light middleweight title; For WBA (Super), WBC, IBF, and The Ring light middleweight titles
19	Draw	17–0–2	Jermell Charlo	SD	12	17 Jul 2021	AT&T Center, San Antonio, Texas, U.S.	Retained WBO light middleweight title; For WBA (Super), WBC, IBF, and The Ring light middleweight titles
18	Win	17–0–1	Patrick Teixeira	UD	12	13 Feb 2021	Fantasy Springs Resort Casino, Indio, California, U.S.	Won WBO light middleweight title
17	Win	16–0–1	Wale Omotoso	RTD	5 (10), 3:00	2 Nov 2019	MGM National Harbor, Oxon Hill, Maryland, U.S.	Won vacant WBO Inter-Continental light middleweight title
16	Draw	15–0–1	Erislandy Lara	SD	12	2 Mar 2019	Barclays Center, New York City, New York, U.S.	Retained WBA (Regular) light middleweight title
15	Win	15–0	Cédric Vitu	TKO	12 (12), 2:27	10 Mar 2018	La Seine Musicale, Boulogne-Billancourt, France	Retained WBA (Regular) light middleweight title
14	Win	14–0	Michel Soro	SD	12	1 Jul 2017	Casino d'Évian, Évian-les-Bains, France	Retained WBA interim light middleweight title
13	Win	13–0	Emmanuel de Jesús	KO	6 (12), 2:23	26 Nov 2016	Polideportivo Juan Domingo Perón, González Catán, Argentina	Won WBA interim light middleweight title
12	Win	12–0	Marcus Upshaw	TKO	5 (10), 2:03	12 Jul 2016	Robinson Rancheria Resort & Casino, Nice, California, U.S.	
11	Win	11–0	Aaron García	UD	8	18 Dec 2015	Palms Casino Resort, Paradise, Nevada, U.S.	
10	Win	10–0	Jonathan Batista	DQ	5 (6), 1:15	29 Aug 2015	Staples Center, Los Angeles, California, U.S.	Batista disqualified for low blows
9	Win	9–0	Todd Manuel	TKO	1 (6), 2:53	26 Jul 2015	Little Creek Casino Resort, Shelton, Washington, U.S.	
8	Win	8–0	Críspulo Javier Andino	TKO	2 (10), 0:07	4 Apr 2015	Club Almirante Brown, San Justo, Argentina	
7	Win	7–0	César Sastre Silva	TKO	4 (8), 0:19	6 Jun 2014	Villa La Ñata Sporting Club, Benavídez, Argentina	
6	Win	6–0	Juan Cuellar	TKO	2 (6), 2:40	12 Apr 2014	Estadio República de Venezuela, San Carlos de Bolívar, Argentina	
5	Win	5–0	Claudinei Lacerda	TKO	5 (8), 2:46	12 Oct 2013	Polideportivo Gustavo Toro Rodriguez, San Martín, Argentina	
4	Win	4–0	César Vélez	TKO	2 (10), 2:27	25 May 2013	Luna Park, Buenos Aires, Argentina	
3	Win	3–0	Pablo Roldan	UD	6	26 Jan 2013	Polideportivo Municipal, Monte Hermoso, Argentina	
2	Win	2–0	Jose Carlos Paz	TKO	5 (6), 1:40	20 Oct 2012	Luna Park, Buenos Aires, Argentina	
1	Win	1–0	Alejandro Antonio Dominguez	TKO	4 (6), 2:59	22 Sep 2012	Luna Park, Buenos Aires, Argentina	

== See also ==
- List of world light-middleweight boxing champions

Sporting positions
World boxing titles
Vacant Title last held by Jack Culcay	WBA light middleweight champion Interim title 26 November 2016 - 22 October 2017; Promoted	Title discontinued
Preceded by Demetrius Andrade; Vacated	WBA light middleweight champion Regular title 22 October 2017 - 20 June 2019; Vacated	Vacant Title next held by Erislandy Lara
Preceded by Patrick Teixeira	WBO light middleweight champion 13 February 2021 – 14 May 2022	Succeeded by Jermell Charlo
