= Magomed Kurbanov (boxer) =

Russian boxer

Personal information
- Native name: Магомед Курбанов
- Nickname: Black Lion
- Born: 3 August 1995 (age 31) Pervomayskoye, Kayakentsky District, Dagestan, Russia
- Height: 177 cm (5 ft 10 in)
- Weight: Light middleweight
- Website: VKontakte

Boxing career
- Stance: Orthodox

Boxing record
- Total fights: 28
- Wins: 26
- Win by KO: 14
- Losses: 2
Medal record
Men's boxing
Representing Russia
Youth World Championships
Gold medal – first place	2008 Guadalajara	Bantamweight

Magomed Ramazanovich Kurbanov (Russian: Магомед Рамазанович Курбанов; born 3 August 1995) is a Russian professional boxer who fights as a light middleweight. As an amateur he won a gold medal at the 2008 Youth World Championships.

== Early life ==
Magomed Kurbanov was born on 3 August 1995, in the village of Pervomayskoye, Kayakentsky District, Dagestan, Russia, into a simple Avar family.

When he was 12, he and his mother moved to Khanty-Mansiysk, a town in western Siberia. His uncle took him to a boxing gym. His first trainer was Alexander Sleptsov. Then he went to Yugra Boarding College of Olympic Reserve.

== Career ==
As an amateur, Kurbanov won titles at the national level, as well as the 2008 Youth World Championship. Kurbanov turned pro in 2015 under Russian promotional outfit RCC Boxing. He made his professional debut on June 19, 2015, winning by technical knockout against Cameroonian boxer Charlan Takam.

After winning his first six pro bouts, Kurbanov defeated Manuk Dilanyan by TKO in May 2016 for his first regional belt. Kurbanov won three more bouts during 2016, winning more regional and minor belts from various sanctioning bodies, and scoring at least one knockdown in each fight.

Kurbanov reached an agreement to fight former three-division world champion Shane Mosley in May 2017, but a month before the fight Mosley pulled out due to injury. Kurbanov instead faced Virgilijus Stapulionis, whom he defeated by TKO in the 9th round. The Mosley fight was rescheduled for September but Mosley would pull out once again due to the same back injury.

In September 2017, Kurbanov defeated number 5 WBO contender Štěpán Horváth by unanimous decision (116–112, 115–112, 115–113). Kurbanov was knocked down for the first time during this fight. He acquired a vacant WBO International light middleweight title.

In December 2017, he defended his title against Akinori Watanabe, in Yekaterinburg city, and won by a technical knockout in the eighth round.

== Personal life ==
Today he lives in the city of Yekaterinburg.

== Professional boxing record ==
28 fights	26 wins	2 losses
By knockout	14	1
By decision	12	1

No.	Result	Record	Opponent	Type	Round, time	Date	Location	Notes
28	Loss	26–2	Pavel Sosulin	SD	12	05 Jul 2025	DIVS, Yekaterinburg, Russia	
27	Win	26–1	Aslanbek Kozaev	TKO	6 (10), 0:40	11 Mar 2024	RCC Boxing Academy, Yekaterinburg, Russia	
26	Loss	25–1	Israil Madrimov	TKO	5 (12), 2:20	8 Mar 2024	Kingdom Arena, Riyadh, Saudi Arabia	For vacant WBA light-middleweight title
25	Win	25–0	Michel Soro	SD	12	5 May 2023	KRK Uralets Arena, Yekaterinburg, Russia	
24	Win	24–0	Johan Gonzalez	UD	10	11 Dec 2022	DIVS, Yekaterinburg, Russia	
23	Win	23–0	Patrick Teixeira	UD	10	9 Jul 2022	KRK Uralets Arena, Yekaterinburg, Russia	
22	Win	22–0	Liam Smith	UD	12	7 May 2021	KRK Uralets Arena, Yekaterinburg, Russia	Won vacant WBO International light middleweight title
21	Win	21–0	Dmitry Mikhaylenko	TKO	2 (10), 1:47	7 Nov 2020	RCC Boxing Academy, Yekaterinburg, Russia	
20	Win	20–0	Ilya Ochkin	KO	1 (10), 1:25	22 Aug 2020	RCC Boxing Academy, Yekaterinburg, Russia	
19	Win	19–0	Ismail Iliev	UD	10	7 Mar 2020	RCC Boxing Academy, Yekaterinburg, Russia	
18	Win	18–0	Diego Chaves	UD	12	2 Nov 2019	RCC Boxing Academy, Yekaterinburg, Russia	Won vacant WBO International light middleweight title
17	Win	17–0	Damian Ezequiel Bonelli	UD	10	22 Feb 2019	KRK "Uralets", Yekaterinburg, Russia	
16	Win	16–0	Juan Carlos Rodríguez	UD	10	13 Oct 2018	Yekaterinburg Expo, Yekaterinburg, Russia	
15	Win	15–0	Charles Manyuchi	UD	10	19 Aug 2018	DIVS, Yekaterinburg, Russia	
14	Win	14–0	Nikolozi Gviniashvili	RTD	7 (10), 3:00	22 Apr 2018	DIVS, Yekaterinburg, Russia	
13	Win	13–0	Akinori Watanabe	TKO	8 (12), 1:15	15 Dec 2017	DIVS, Yekaterinburg, Russia	Retained WBO International light middleweight title
12	Win	12–0	Štěpán Horváth	UD	12	9 Sep 2017	DIVS, Yekaterinburg, Russia	Won vacant WBO International light middleweight title
11	Win	11–0	Virgilijus Stapulionis	TKO	9 (10), 2:34	5 May 2017	DIVS, Yekaterinburg, Russia	Won vacant WBO Intercontinental light middleweight title
10	Win	10–0	Szabolcs Szabo	KO	2 (8), 2:19	17 Dec 2016	Yekaterinburg Expo, Yekaterinburg, Russia	Won vacant WBO Youth light middleweight title
9	Win	9–0	Dennis Laurente	UD	10	18 Nov 2016	KRK Uralets, Yekaterinburg, Russia	Retained WBC Asian Boxing Council Silver light middleweight title Won vacant WBC Eurasia Pacific Boxing Council light middleweight title
8	Win	8–0	Davi Eliasquevici	TKO	3 (10), 1:53	11 Jul 2016	KRK Uralets, Yekaterinburg, Russia	Retained WBC Asian Boxing Council Silver light middleweight title
7	Win	7–0	Manuk Dilanyan	TKO	9 (10), 0:45	6 May 2016	KRK Uralets, Yekaterinburg, Russia	Won vacant WBC Asian Boxing Council Silver light middleweight title
6	Win	6–0	Omar Marabayev	TKO	3 (6), 1:51	5 Mar 2016	Sports Palace, Beloyarsk, Russia	
5	Win	5–0	Ivan Antropov	TKO	2 (6), 1:38	16 Nov 2015	PNTZ Palace of Culture, Pervouralsk, Russia	
4	win	4–0	Alexey Evchenko	UD	6	26 Sep 2015	Arena (ex Rings), Yekaterinburg, Russia	
3	win	3–0	Shavkat Madaminov	UD	2 (8), 2:12	10 Sep 2015	Ambar, Tolyatti, Russia	
2	win	2–0	Maxim Potapov	RTD	3 (8), 3:00	30 Jul 2015	Ambar, Tolyatti, Russia	
1	win	1–0	Charlan Takam	TKO	2 (4), 1:46	19 Jun 2015	Vodoley, Yekaterinburg, Russia	
