= Elijah Garcia (boxer) =

American professional boxer (born 2003)

Elijah Lorenzo Garcia
Personal information
- Born: 26 April 2003 (age 23) Glendale, Arizona, U.S.
- Height: 6'0
- Weight: super middleweight

Boxing career
- Reach: 71
- Stance: Southpaw

Boxing record
- Total fights: 19
- Wins: 17
- Win by KO: 13
- Losses: 2

Elijah Garcia (born April 26, 2003) is an American professional boxer of Mexican descent who competes in the super middleweight division.

== Amateur career ==
Garcia had a short amateur career that included winning a US National Championship in 2017. After becoming a father at age 16 he decided to turn pro.

== Professional career ==
=== Garcia vs. Vidal Jr ===
After defeating his early opponents with ease Garcia faced unbeaten Uruguayan Amilcar Vidal Jr on the undercard of Brandon Figueroa vs Mark Magsayo in Ontario, California. Garcia dominated, dropping Vidal Jr in the fourth round and he was unable to beat the count.

=== Garcia vs. Resendiz ===
Garcia faced his toughest fight to date against Mexican Jose Armando Resendiz who was coming off a 10th round stoppage victory over former light middleweight champion Jarrett Hurd. The fight took place at the T-Mobile Arena on the undercard of Canelo Alvarez vs Jermell Charlo. In what turned out to be an all action fight, Garcia dropped Resendiz in the eight and soon after got the stoppage from a flurry.

=== Garcia vs. Davis ===
Garcia was scheduled to face Kyrone Davis on the undercard of Gervonta Davis vs Frank Martin on June 15, 2024 in Las Vegas. Garcia missed the middleweight limit by 3.2 pounds, and lost the fight by split decision.

=== Garcia vs. Gausha ===
On January 3, 2025 it was reported that Garcia would face Terrell Gausha on February 15, 2025. Garcia won the fight by split decision.

== Professional boxing record ==
19 fights	17 wins	2 losses
By knockout	13	0
By decision	4	2

No.	Result	Record	Opponent	Type	Round, time	Date	Location	Notes
19	Loss	17-2	Kevin Newman II	MD	10	Mar 28, 2026	MGM Grand Garden Arena, Paradise, Nevada, U.S.	
18	Win	17-1	Terrell Gausha	SD	10	Mar 22, 2025	Michelob Ultra Arena, Paradise, Nevada, U.S.	
17	Loss	16–1	Kyrone Davis	SD	10	Jun 15, 2024	MGM Grand Garden Arena, Paradise, Nevada, U.S	
16	Win	16–0	Armando Reséndiz	TKO	8 (10), 1:23	Sep 30, 2023	T-Mobile Arena, Paradise, Nevada, U.S	
15	Win	15–0	Kevin Salgado Zambrano	UD	10	Apr 22, 2023	T-Mobile Arena, Paradise, Nevada, U.S	
14	Win	14-0	Amilcar Vidal Jr.	KO	4 (10), 2:17	Mar 4, 2023	Toyota Arena, Ontario, California, U.S	
13	Win	13–0	Cruse Stewart	KO	2 (8), 1:33	Dec 17, 2022	Chelsea Ballroom, Paradise, Nevada, U.S	
12	Win	12–0	Edgar Valenzuela	KO	1 (6), 2:18	Oct 8, 2022	Dignity Health Sports Park, Carson, California, U.S	
11	Win	11–0	Rowdy Legend Montgomery	UD	6	May 21, 2022	Gila River Arena, Glendale, Arizona, U.S	
10	Win	10–0	Antonio Louis Hernandez	RTD	3 (6), 3:00	Feb 5, 2022	Footprint Center, Phoenix, Arizona, U.S	
9	Win	9-0	Todd Manuel	TKO	5 (6), 2:35	Nov 13, 2021	Footprint Center, Phoenix, Arizona, U.S	
8	Win	8–0	Michael Lemelle	TKO	3 (6), 2:55	Sep 18, 2021	Arizona Federal Theatre, Phoenix, Arizona, U.S	
7	Win	7-0	Fernando Hernandez	UD	4	Jul 2, 2021	Arizona Federal Theatre, Phoenix, Arizona, U.S	
6	Win	6–0	Phillip Carmouche	TKO	1 (4), 2:25	Jun 4, 2021	Arizona Federal Theatre, Phoenix, Arizona, U.S	
5	Win	5–0	Juan Jose Valencia Villegas	TKO	2 (4), 2:23	Apr 17, 2021	La Terraza Sports Bar, Agua Prieta, Mexico	
4	Win	4–0	Carlos Urrea Luzanilla	TKO	1 (4) 2:05	Jan 29, 2021	Agua Prieta, Mexico	
3	Win	3–0	Luis Munoz Duran	TKO	1 (4), 2:57	Sep 26, 2020	Salon CTM, San Luis Rio Colorado, Mexico	
2	Win	2–0	Noe Marquez Talamantes	KO	2 (4), 2:28	Mar 6, 2020	Auditorio Municipal, Ascension, Mexico	
1	Win	1–0	Jose Roberto Hernandez Serano	TKO	1 (4), 0:28	Feb 22, 2020	Salon CTM, San Luis Rio Colorado, Mexico	
