= Mike Jimenez =

American boxer

Mike Jimenez (born May 15, 1987) is an American professional boxer in the Super Middleweight division. Jimenez fought Jesse Hart for the USBA Super Middleweight title on the undercard of Mayweather-Pacquiao.
