= Canelo Álvarez vs. Jaime Munguía =

Boxing match

- Date: May 4, 2024
- Venue: T-Mobile Arena; Paradise, Nevada, United States
- Title(s) on the line: WBA (Super), WBC, WBO, IBF and The Ring super middleweight titles

Tale of the tape
Boxer	Saúl Álvarez	Jaime Munguía
Nickname	Canelo ("Cinnamon")	
Hometown	Guadalajara, Jalisco, Mexico	Tijuana, Baja California, Mexico
Purse	$35,000,000	$10,000,000
Pre-fight record	60–2–2 (39 KO)	43–0 (34 KO)
Age	33 years, 9 months	27 years, 6 months
Height	5 ft 8 in (173 cm)	5 ft 9 1/2 in (177 cm)
Weight	166 3/4 lb (76 kg)	167 1/2 lb (76 kg)
Style	Orthodox	Orthodox
Recognition	WBA (Super), WBC, WBO, IBF and The Ring; Super Middleweight Champion	WBC Silver; Super Middleweight Champion

Result
- Álvarez wins via 12-round unanimous decision (117–110, 116–111, 115–112)

Canelo Álvarez vs. Jaime Munguía was a professional boxing match contested on May 4, 2024, for the WBA (Super), WBC, WBO, IBF and The Ring super middleweight titles.

== Background ==
In early March 2024 it was announced the reigning undisputed super middleweight champion Canelo Álvarez would defend his crown against his undefeated countryman and former light middleweight champion Jaime Munguía two months later on May 4, 2024. The 27-year old Munguía had reportedly earned the title shot after impressively defeating former Álvarez opponent John Ryder via ninth-round technical knockout.

Initial plans were to see Álvarez face former 2-division champion Jermall Charlo after having defeated Charlo's twin brother Jermell in his previous fight, however, Álvarez was unable to come to financial terms with Premier Boxing Champions (PBC) causing the fight to fall through and Álvarez to temporarily part ways with the company despite having two fight remaining on his current deal. Álvarez would return to Premier Boxing Champions on a one-fight deal that would encompass the Munguía fight. The bout would appear on both Amazon Prime's pay-per-view service, which had a deal with PBC, and DAZN, which had an exclusive contract with Golden Boy Promotions, who promoted Munguía.

== Fight Details ==
Munguía got off to a good start and won all three of the first three rounds on two of the judge's scorecards and two of three on the third. However, Álvarez would take control of the fight starting in the fourth, scoring the lone knockdown of the fight after dropping Munguía with a right uppercut. Following the fourth, Álvarez would win most of the remaining rounds, with Munguía only winning the ninth round unanimously on the three official scorecards. The fight would end up going the full 12-round distance with Álvarez earning the victory via unanimous decision with scores of 117–110, 116–111 and 115–112.

== Fight card ==
Confirmed bouts:

Weight Class	Weight		vs.		Method	Round	Time	Notes
Super Middleweight	168 lbs.	Canelo Álvarez (c)	def.	Jaime Munguía	UD	12		^{note 1}
Welterweight	147 lbs.	Mario Barrios (c)	def.	Fabián Maidana	UD	12		^{note 2}
Featherweight	126 lbs.	Brandon Figueroa (c)	def.	Jessie Magdaleno	KO	9/12	2:59	^{note 3}
Welterweight	147 lbs.	Eimantas Stanionis (c)	def.	Gabriel Maestre	UD	12		^{note 4}
Preliminary Card
Super Welterweight	154 lbs.	Jesus Ramos	def.	Johan Gonzalez	TKO	9/10	2:56
Super Welterweight	154 lbs.	Vito Mielnicki Jr.	def.	Ronald Cruz	UD	10		^{note 5}
Non-TV bouts
Super Middleweight	168 lbs.	William Scull	def.	Sean Hemphill	UD	8
Super Bantamweight	122 lbs.	David Picasso	def.	Damien Vazquez	TKO	5/8	2:11
Lightweight	135 lbs.	Julian Bridges	def.	Jabin Chollet	UD	6
Cruiserweight	200 lbs.	Lawrence King	def.	Anthony Hollaway	UD	6
Lightweight	135 lbs.	Adrian Torres	def.	Arsen Poghosyan	UD	6

^Note 1 For WBA (Super), WBC, WBO, IBF and The Ring Super Middleweight Titles
^Note 2 For WBC Interim Welterweight Title
^Note 3 For WBC Interim Featherweight Title
^Note 4 For WBA (Regular) Welterweight Title
^Note 5 For Vacant WBC USA Super Welterweight Title

== Broadcasting ==
Country	Broadcaster
United States	Amazon Prime / DAZN

Preceded by vs. Jermell Charlo	Canelo Álvarez's bouts 4 May 2024	Succeeded by vs. Edgar Berlanga
Preceded by vs. John Ryder	Jaime Munguía's bouts 4 May 2024	Succeeded by vs. Erik Bazinyan
