= Cédric Vitu =

French boxer

Personal information
- Nickname: Titi
- Nationality: French
- Born: August 18, 1985 (age 41) Creil, Oise, France
- Height: 178 cm (5 ft 10 in)
- Weight: Light middleweight

Boxing career
- Reach: 180 cm (71 in)
- Stance: Southpaw

Boxing record
- Total fights: 52
- Wins: 48
- Win by KO: 19
- Losses: 4

Cédric Vitu (born August 18, 1985) is a French professional boxer. He held the European light middleweight title between 2015 and 2017, the European Union light middleweight title between 2011 and 2012, and challenged for the WBA light middleweight title in 2018.

== Professional career ==
Vitu first challenged for the EBU title on 2012, facing the undefeated Sergey Rabchenko in Manchester on the undercard of Ricky Hatton's comeback bout against Vyacheslav Senchenko. Rabchenko, promoted by Hatton, prevailed on a split decision.

In June 2015, Vitu got another shot at the EBU title against Orlando Fiordigiglio in Brescia. He won the title beating Fiordigiglio by technical knockout in round 11. Back in France, Vitu retained his belt against Roberto Santos in December 2015 and Ruben Varon in March 2016. He was named European Boxer of the Year by the EBU in June 2016. Vitu notched another successful defense against Isaac Real in January 2017. In May, he fought in an IBF title eliminator against Marcello Matano. Vitu defeated Matano with a round 10 TKO, becoming the mandatory challenger to IBF champion, Jarrett Hurd. Following his win, Vitu vacated the EBU title.

== Professional boxing record ==
53 fights	48 wins	4 losses
By knockout	19	2
By decision	29	2
Draws	1	

No.	Result	Record	Opponent	Type	Round, Time	Date	Location	Notes
53	Draw	48–4–1	Ognjen Raukovic	MD	6	27 Nov 2021	Espace Mayenne, Laval, France	
52	Win	48–4	Konstantin Aleksandrov	UD	6	3 Jul 2021	Place Gerald Palteau, Pont-Sainte-Maxence	
51	Loss	47–4	Michel Soro	TKO	5 (12), 2:03	15 Nov 2019	Accor Hotel Arena, Paris, France	For WBA Gold super-welterweight title
50	Win	47–3	Predrag Cvetkovic	UD	6	21 Dec 2018	Salle Albert Camus, Creil, France	
49	Loss	46–3	Brian Castaño	TKO	12 (12), 2:27	10 Mar 2018	La Seine Musicale, Boulogne-Billancourt	For WBA (Regular) super welterweight title
48	Win	46–2	Marcello Matano	TKO	10 (12), 1:16	18 May 2017	Cirque d'Hiver, Paris, France	IBF super-welterweight title eliminator
47	Win	45–2	Isaac Real	UD	12	21 Jan 2017	Palais des Sport Marcel Cerdan, Levallous-Perret, France	Retained European super-welterweight title
46	Win	44–2	Ruben Varon	TKO	4 (12), 1:23	12 Mar 2016	Palais des Sport Marcel Cerdan, Levallois-Perret, France	Retained European super-welterweight title
45	Win	43–2	Roberto Santos	MD	12	17 Dec 2015	Cirque d'Hiver, Paris, France	Retained European super-welterweight title
44	Win	42–2	Orlando Fiordigiglio	TKO	11 (12), 2:27	13 Jun 2015	Palasport San Filippo, Brescia, Italy	Won vacant European super-welterweight title
43	Win	41–2	Davit Ribakoni	UD	6	13 Feb 2015	salle Marcel Dufour, Louvroil, France	
42	Win	40–2	Kobe Vandekerkhove	UD	6	15 Nov 2014	Salle Marcel Coene, Montataire, France	
41	Win	39–2	Artem Karasev	UD	6	3 Oct 2014	Cosec, Vireux-Wallerand, France	
40	Win	38–2	Laurent Ferra	UD	6	15 May 2014	Parc des Sports et Loisirs, Pont-Audemer, France	
39	Win	37–2	Renat Samedov	TKO	3 (6)	29 Mar 2014	Salle Georges Tainturier, Compiègne, France	
38	Win	36–2	Andreas Reimer	PTS	6	20 Apr 2013	Palais des Sports, Toulon, France	
37	Loss	35–2	Sergey Rabchenko	SD	12	24 Nov 2012	Manchester Arena, Manchester, England	For European and vacant WBC Silver super-welterweight titles
36	Win	35–1	Sergei Melis	TKO	5 (8)	26 May 2012	Salle Albert Camus, Creil, France	
35	Win	34–1	Mounir Guebbas	UD	6	5 Apr 2012	Salle du Casino, Enghien, France	
34	Win	33–1	Konstantins Sakara	UD	6	24 Nov 2011	Salle du Casino, Enghien, France	
33	Win	32–1	Kai Kauramaki	TKO	7 (12)	18 Jun 2011	Salle de sports, Rantigny, France	Won vacant EBU European Union super-welterweight title
32	Win	31–1	Mehdi Nekaies	UD	10	4 Mar 2011	Salle Albert Camus, Creil, France	Retained French super-welterweight title
31	Win	30–1	Ionut Trandafir	PTS	6	4 Feb 2011	Salle Constant Saisis, Laval, France	
30	Win	29–1	Christophe Canclaux	UD	10	4 Dec 2010	Salle Jean Davesne, Soissons, France	Retained French super-welterweight title
29	Win	28–1	Nicolas Guisset	UD	10	6 Mar 2010	Salle Jean Davesne, Soissons, France	Won vacant French super-welterweight title
28	Win	27–1	Domingos Nascimento Monteiro	TKO	3 (6)	18 Dec 2009	Salle municipale, Rantigny, France	
27	Win	26–1	Bertrand Souleyras	TKO	6 (6)	4 Dec 2009	Palais des Sports, Agde, France	
26	Win	25–1	Georges Prestot	UD	6	9 Jun 2009	Parc des Sports, Pont-Audemer, France	
25	Win	24–1	Gogi Knezevic	KO	11 (12)	4 Apr 2009	Salle Renaux, Rosny-sur-Seine, France	Won vacant WBC Mediterranean super-welterweight title
24	Win	23–1	Florin Bogdan	TKO	5 (8)	5 Mar 2009	Halle Martenot, Rennes, France	
23	Win	22–1	Marius Racaru	TKO	1 (8)	30 Jan 2009	Salle Descartes, Creil, France	
22	Win	21–1	Hakim Rouassi	PTS	6	13 Dec 2008	Salle Marcel Coene, Montataire, France	
21	Win	20–1	Raul Asencio	PTS	8	15 Nov 2008	Salle la Soucoupe, Saint-Nazaire, France	
20	Win	19–1	Raul Saiz	TKO	1 (6)	21 Oct 2008	Salle David Douillet, Fourmies, France	
19	Loss	18–1	Hamlet Petrosyan	MD	12	17 May 2008	Salle Albert Camus, Creil, France	For IBF Inter-Continental super-welterweight title
18	Win	18–0	Eugenio Monteiro	TKO	2 (6)	4 Apr 2008	Salle Leo Lagrange, Pont-Sainte-Maxence	
17	Win	17–0	Mugurel Sebe	PTS	6	7 Mar 2008	Salle Leo Lagrange, Pont-Sainte-Maxence	
16	Win	16–0	Boubacar Sidibe	TKO	2 (6)	16 Feb 2008	Salle Aimé Bergal, Mantes-la-Ville, France	
15	Win	15–0	János Petrovics	PTS	6	7 Dec 2007	Salle Leo Lagrange, Pont-Sainte-Maxence, France	
14	Win	14–0	Mugurel Sebe	PTS	6	16 Nov 2007	Salle Marcel Coene, Montataire, France	
13	Win	13–0	Eugen Stan	PTS	6	30 Oct 2007	Centre Omnisports, Massy, France	
12	Win	12–0	Yacine Chouaou	UD	6	29 May 2007	Parc des Sports, Pont-Audemer, France	Finale du Tournoi de France ("Final of the French Tournament")
11	Win	11–0	Anthony Somarriba	PTS	6	31 Mar 2007	Salle des fetes, Châteauneuf-du-Pape, France	? Finale du Tournoi de France ("? Final of the French Tournament")
10	Win	10–0	Miroslav Dicky	PTS	6	23 Feb 2007	Salle Marcel Cerdan, Montataire, France	
9	Win	9–0	Alassane Coulibaly	RTD	4 (6)	30 Jan 2007	Salle Leo Lagrange, Pont-Sainte-Maxence, France	
8	Win	8–0	Assad Younes	PTS	6	15 Dec 2006	Salle Leo Lagrange, Pont-Sainte-Maxence, France	1/4 de finale du Tournoi de France ("1/4 final of the French Tournament")
7	Win	7–0	Lubomir Wejs	TKO	3 (6)	17 Nov 2006	Salle Marcel Coene, Montataire, France	
6	Win	6–0	Rumen Kostov	TKO	3 (4)	17 Jun 2006	Salle Pierre de Coubertin, Beauvais, France	
5	Win	5–0	Robert Blazo	PTS	4	3 Jun 2006	Montataire, Oise, France	
4	Win	4–0	Stefan Dimitrov	TKO	2 (4)	19 May 2006	Gymnase Georges Buffenoir, Rivery, France	
3	Win	3–0	Christian Marquette	PTS	4	11 Mar 2006	Salle Georges Berton, Saint-Just-en-Chaussée, France	
2	Win	2–0	Faisal Bahache	TKO	3 (4)	4 Feb 2006	Montataire, Oise, France	
1	Win	1–0	Larbi Ben Mahmoud	PTS	4	17 Dec 2005	Salle Georges Tainturier, Compiègne, France	
