= Patrick Teixeira =

Brazilian boxer

Personal information
- Born: Patrick Alen Teixeira; 5 December 1990 (age 35) Sombrio, Brazil
- Height: 5 ft 11 1/2 in (182 cm)
- Weight: Light middleweight; Middleweight

Boxing career
- Reach: 74 1/2 in (189 cm)
- Stance: Southpaw

Boxing record
- Total fights: 39
- Wins: 34
- Win by KO: 25
- Losses: 5

Patrick Alen Teixeira (born 5 December 1990) is a Brazilian professional boxer who held the WBO light middleweight title from 2019 to 2021.

== Professional career ==
Teixeira turned professional in 2009, winning his first 25 fights before facing Curtis Stevens on 7 May 2016 (on the undercard of Canelo Álvarez vs. Amir Khan), who stopped him in two rounds to win the vacant World Boxing Council Continental Americas middleweight title. Previously, on 15 March 2014, Teixeira defeated Ignacio Lucero Fraga by a first-round KO to become the Latino super welterweight champion. He signed with Golden Boy Promotions in 2015 and was predicted to become Brazil's best chance of winning a boxing world title.

On 1 September 2018, Teixeira fought Nathaniel Gallimore. Teixeira won via unanimous decision, winning 78–74 on all three scorecards.

On 30 November 2019, Teixeira fought his biggest fight up to date, fighting against Carlos Adames for the WBO interim light middleweight title. Teixeira was ranked #2 by the WBO, and #12 by the WBC and WBA at super welterweight at the time, while his opponent was ranked #1 by the WBO, #3 by the IBF, #4 by the WBA and #5 by the WBC in the same division. Teixeira, despite being the underdog, managed to secure a unanimous decision win, scoring 114–113 on two of the scorecards and 116–111 on the third one. Teixeira managed to drop Adames in the seventh round, which proved to be the decisive factor on the scorecards. Teixeira would get upgraded to full champion after Jaime Munguía moved up to middleweight, he would go on to lose the title in his first defence against Brian Castaño.

On 8 June 2024, Teixeira faced Xander Zayas at The Theater at Madison Square Garden in New York, he lost via unanimous decision.

== Professional boxing record ==
39 fights	34 wins	5 losses
By knockout	25	1
By decision	9	3
By disqualification	0	1

No.	Result	Record	Opponent	Type	Round, time	Date	Location	Notes
39	Loss	34–5	Xander Zayas	UD	10	8 Jun 2024	MSG Theater, New York City, New York, US	For WBO-NABO and WBC-NABF light-middleweight titles
38	Win	34–4	Edisson Saltarin	TKO	4 (10), 0:03	16 Mar 2024	Club Cassasp, São Paulo Brazil	
37	Win	33–4	Carlos Rivero	KO	2 (10), 1:45	27 Aug 2023	Mais Shopping, São Paulo, Brazil	Won vacant WBA Fedebol middleweight title
36	Win	32–4	Adrian Perez	KO	1 (8), 2:10	26 Nov 2022	Hotel Golden Park, Sorocaba, Brazil	
35	Loss	31–4	Magomed Kurbanov	UD	10	9 Jul 2022	KRK Uralets, Yekaterinburg, Russia	
34	Loss	31–3	Paul Valenzuela Cuesta	DQ	2 (10), 0:16	9 Apr 2022	Alamodome, San Antonio, Texas, US	
33	Loss	31–2	Brian Castaño	UD	12	13 Feb 2021	Fantasy Springs Resort Casino, Indio, California, US	Lost WBO light-middleweight title
32	Win	31–1	Carlos Adames	UD	12	30 Nov 2019	Cosmopolitan of Las Vegas, Paradise, Nevada, US	Won vacant WBO interim light middleweight title
31	Win	30–1	Mario Alberto Lozano	MD	10	13 Apr 2019	Arena Monterrey, Monterrey, Mexico	Retained WBO Latino light-middleweight title
30	Win	29–1	Nathaniel Gallimore	UD	8	1 Sep 2018	Fantasy Springs Resort Casino, Indio, California, US	
29	Win	28–1	Davi Eliasquevici	UD	10	7 Apr 2018	Jundiaí, Brazil	Won vacant WBO Latino light middleweight title
28	Win	27–1	Andrew Hernandez	UD	8	29 Jul 2017	Casino Del Sol, Tucson, Arizona, US	
27	Loss	26–1	Curtis Stevens	TKO	2 (10), 1:04	7 May 2016	T-Mobile Arena, Paradise, Nevada, US	For vacant WBC Continental Americas middleweight title
26	Win	26–0	Don Mouton	TKO	7 (10), 1:31	2 Oct 2015	Belasco Theatre, Los Angeles, California, US	
25	Win	25–0	Patrick Allotey	KO	2 (10), 2:03	18 Apr 2015	Turning Stone Resort Casino, Verona, New York, US	
24	Win	24–0	Ulises David Lopez	KO	3 (10)	15 Nov 2014	Ginásio Municipal Falcâo, Praia Grande, Brazil	Retained WBO Latino light-middleweight title
23	Win	23–0	Mateo Damian Veron	UD	10	30 Aug 2014	Sede A.G.B., Guarulhos, Brazil	
22	Win	22–0	Ignacio Lucero Fraga	KO	1 (12), 2:25	15 Mar 2014	São Carlos, Brazil	Retained WBO interim Latino light-middleweight title
21	Win	21–0	Alejandro Gustavo Falliga	TKO	5 (12)	13 Nov 2013	Jundiaí, Brazil	Won WBO interim Latino light-middleweight title
20	Win	20–0	Marcus Willis	UD	10	28 Jun 2013	Veteran's Coliseum, Jacksonville, Florida, US	
19	Win	19–0	Luis Acevedo	KO	1 (10)	12 Jan 2013	Foro Polanco, Mexico City, Mexico	
18	Win	18–0	Omar Vasquez	TKO	8 (10), 3:00	8 Sep 2012	Auditorio Teopanzolco, Cuernavaca, Mexico	Won vacant WBC Youth Intercontinental light-middleweight title
17	Win	17–0	Alfredo Chavez	TKO	1 (8), 0:13	14 Jul 2012	Foro Polanco, Mexico City, Mexico	
16	Win	16–0	Javier Hernandez	KO	1 (8)	4 May 2012	Foro Polanco, Mexico City, Mexico	
15	Win	15–0	Samir dos Santos Barbosa	TKO	1 (9), 2:59	6 Mar 2012	Ginasio Baby Barione, São Paulo, Brazil	Won vacant WBA Fedecentro middleweight title
14	Win	14–0	Filipe Dos Anjos Matos	TKO	1 (6), 1:35	12 Nov 2011	Ginasio Municipal, São Paulo, Brazil	
13	Win	13–0	Pablo Aguero	KO	2 (8), 1:13	23 Aug 2011	Ginasio Baby Barione, São Paulo, Brazil	
12	Win	12–0	David Lopez	SD	6	5 Feb 2011	Maywood Activity Center, Maywood, California, US	
11	Win	11–0	Dario Armando Matorras	TKO	1 (8), 2:53	7 Dec 2010	Ginasio Baby Barione, São Paulo, Brazil	
10	Win	10–0	Hector Martin Trinidad	KO	2 (8), 1:30	14 Sep 2010	Ginasio Baby Barione, São Paulo, Brazil	
9	Win	9–0	Eraldo Cesar Pereira	KO	3 (8), 2:56	29 Jun 2010	Ginasio Baby Barione, São Paulo, Brazil	
8	Win	8–0	Jailton De Jesus Souza	KO	1 (8), 1:04	1 Jun 2010	Ginasio Baby Barione, São Paulo, Brazil	
7	Win	7–0	Esmeraldo Jose da Silva	TKO	3 (8), 2:55	13 Apr 2010	Ginasio Baby Barione, São Paulo, Brazil	
6	Win	6–0	Joseph De los Santos	SD	6	19 Feb 2010	Miccosukee Resort & Gaming, Miami, Florida, US	
5	Win	5–0	Adan Martinez	RTD	3 (8), 3:00	8 Dec 2009	Ginasio Baby Barione, São Paulo, Brazil	
4	Win	4–0	Valdevan Pereira	TKO	5 (6), 0:31	24 Oct 2009	Casablanca, São Paulo, Brazil	
3	Win	3–0	Roberto Carlos	TKO	2 (4), 2:33	19 Sep 2009	Ginasio Municipal, São Paulo, Brazil	
2	Win	2–0	Flavio Pardinho	TKO	2 (4), 1:26	8 Sep 2009	Ginasio Baby Barione, São Paulo, Brazil	
1	Win	1–0	Fabio Pardinho	KO	2 (4), 1:02	11 Aug 2009	Ginasio Baby Barione, São Paulo, Brazil	

== See also ==
- List of southpaw stance boxers
- List of world light-middleweight boxing champions

Sporting positions
Regional boxing titles
Vacant Title last held by Nilson Julio Tapia	WBA Fedecentro middleweight champion March 6, 2012 – 2012; Vacated	Vacant Title next held by Rafael Sosa Pintos
Vacant Title last held by Martin Avila	WBC Youth Intercontinental light-middleweight champion September 8, 2012 – 2012; Vacated	Vacant
Vacant Title last held by Javier Francisco Maciel	WBO Latino light-middleweight champion November 15, 2014 – 2015; Vacated	Vacant Title next held by Daniel Rosario Cruz
Vacant Title last held by Ricardo Ruben Villalba	WBO Latino light-middleweight champion April 7, 2018 – November 30, 2019; Won interim title	Vacant Title next held by Damian Sosa
Vacant Title last held by Edisson Saltarin	WBA Fedebol middleweight champion August 27, 2023 – 2024; Vacated	Vacant
World boxing titles
Vacant Title last held by Lukáš Konečný	WBO light-middleweight champion Interim title November 30, 2019 – December 4, 2019; Promoted	Vacant Title next held by Tim Tszyu
Preceded by Jaime Munguía; Vacated	WBO light-middleweight champion December 4, 2019 – February 13, 2021	Succeeded by Brian Castaño
