= Jermell Charlo vs. Brian Castaño II =

Boxing match

- Date: May 14, 2022
- Venue: Dignity Health Sports Park, Carson, California, U.S.
- Title(s) on the line: WBA (Super), WBC, IBF, WBO, The Ring undisputed and TBRB light middleweight titles

Tale of the tape
Boxer	Jermell Charlo	Brian Castaño
Nickname	"Iron Man"	"El Boxi"
Hometown	Lafeyette, Louisiana, U.S.	Isidro Casanova, Buenos Aires Province, Argentina
Pre-fight record	34–1–1 (18 KOs)	17–0–2 (12 KOs)
Age	31 years, 11 months	32 years, 8 months
Height	5 ft 11 in (180 cm)	5 ft 7 1/2 in (171 cm)
Weight	152 3/4 lb (69 kg)	153 3/4 lb (70 kg)
Style	Orthodox	Orthodox
Recognition	WBA (Super), WBC, IBF, and The Ring; Light Middleweight Champion; TBRB; No. 1 Ranked Light Middleweight	WBO; Light Middleweight Champion; The Ring/TBRB; No. 2 Ranked Light Middleweight

Result
- Charlo defeats Castaño by 10th round KO

Jermell Charlo vs. Brian Castaño II was a professional boxing match contested on May 14, 2022, for the undisputed light middleweight championship.

== Background ==
On July 17, 2021, Charlo and Castaño faced each other for the first time, battling to a controversial split draw at the AT&T Center in San Antonio, Texas. Many believed Castaño did enough to win, and much attention was drawn to judge Nelson Vazquez's 117–111 scorecard in favor of Charlo, which was criticized by many prominent figures in the boxing world, including Andre Ward, Lou DiBella and Eddie Chambers. In the post-fight press conference, Charlo himself appeared to admit that he disagreed with Vazquez's scorecard, saying, "...honestly I think it was a closer fight than it seems. Somebody had it like 117–111... 117–111 was kind of a large range."

Following the controversial draw, both boxers spoke openly with the media about a rematch. Castaño said, “I think if Charlo is not afraid for a rematch, and I don’t think he is afraid, I don’t know what his plans are. If he’s planning to move up to 160, that’s up to him. But like I said before, I need the three belts that he has, so I’m up for a rematch, of course. But I don’t know what, exactly, are his plans.” Charlo said he would take the rematch, but did not know when. On November 27, 2021, it was revealed by ESPN that Castaño and Charlo had agreed to face each other in a rematch. The WBO agreed to not order any mandatories to allow the rematch to take place. The fight was officially announced on February 8, 2022, to take place on March 19 at the Crypto.com Arena in Los Angeles, California.

After suffering a slight biceps tear during training, Castaño was forced to withdraw on February 17. This caused the fight to me postponed for at least four weeks. Upon hearing the news, Charlo posted on Instagram, “[Two times] in a row they done tried to pull the same stunt. Naw I ain’t buying it.” A day later, the WBO ordered Castaño to show cause as to why Charlo shouldn't be scheduled to make an overdue mandatory title defense against Tim Tszyu. The WBO took some time in making a decision, but ultimately approved the rematch, which was rearranged to take place on May 14 at the Dignity Health Sports Park in Carson, California. Castaño was happy the fight was taking place in Southern California, which meant it was easier for his Latino fans to attend. Castaño did not want to leave the decision for the judges this time and aimed for a statement win. Castaño officially weighed 153¾ pounds and Charlo weighed one pound lighter at 152¾ pounds.

== The fight ==
Like the first fight, the rematch was competitive, the two men spent the opening rounds trading blows before Charlo began to build a lead. In the 10th round, Charlo scored 2 knockdowns, the first with a body shot followed up by a left hook. The second was left to the head and another body shot sent Castaño back to the canvas badly hurt, he did not beat the count and Charlo was awarded a KO victory. Charlo unified the WBO belt with his WBA, WBC and IBF light middleweight belts, becoming the 7th male four-belt undisputed champion in history and the first undisputed light middleweight champion since Winky Wright in 2004. Castaño was down on all three of the judges' scorecards at the time of the stoppage, with scores of 84–87, 83–88 and 82–89.

== Aftermath ==
Speaking after the bout Charlo said "I showed the fans, I showed these haters I can stand there and trade. One thing I changed up is try not to be on the ropes too much ... place shots on really precise parts on the body and wear him out." Castaño was gracious in defeat saying "We both were fighting back and forth. It was power back and forth, and then his right hand came over and stopped the fight. He's a champion. He hit me. He got me. We showed that we are warriors. That's the main thing. We have to feed our families." According to Compubox, Charlo 173 of 559 punches thrown (30.9%), and Castaño landed 194 of his 610 thrown (31.8%), 174 of which were power punches. Both landed over 40% of their power punches. The fight averaged 756,000 viewers, peaking at 832,000 viewers, making it Showtime's biggest audience for boxing match in three years, since Wilder vs. Breazeale.

A planned bout between Charlo and WBO mandatory Tszyu on January 29, 2023, was postponed, following Charlo reporting that he had broken two bones in his left hand. Tszyu would subsequently win an Interim title and the WBO would order Charlo to defend their belt against Tszyu before September 30 or be stripped.

When, on 1 July, it was announced that Charlo would move up two divisions to face Álvarez, Tszyu, who it was reported only found out about Charlo's change of plans on social media, said on Instagram "Canelo ducks benavidez. Charlo ducks Tszyu".

== Undercard ==
Confirmed bouts:

Winner	Loser	Weight division/title belt(s) disputed	Result
(United States) Jaron Ennis	(Canada) Custio Clayton	IBF welterweight title eliminator	2nd-round KO
(Mexico) Kevin Gonzalez	(Puerto Rico) Emanuel Rivera	Super bantamweight (10 rounds)	Unanimous decision
(Philippines) Marlon Tapales	(Mexico) Jose Estrella	Featherweight (8 rounds)	2nd-round KO
Preliminary bouts
(United States) Brandyn Lynch	(United States) Marcos Hernandez	Middleweight (8 rounds)	Unanimous decision
(United States) Anthony Cuba	(United States) Oscar Acevedo	Lightweight (6 rounds)	2nd-round KO
(United States) Jose Perez	(United States) Anthony Chavez	Super featherweight (6 rounds)	Majority decision
(Armenia) Gurgen Hovhannisyan	(United States) Jesse Bryan	Heavyweight (6 rounds)	2nd-round KO
(United States) Jerry Perez	(Nicaragua) Erick Lanzas Jr	Lightweight (6 rounds)	5th-round KO
(Cuba) Geovany Bruzon	(Mexico) Daniel Najera	Heavyweight (4 rounds)	4th round RTD
(Argentina) Jose Mejia	(United States) Matthew Reed	Light middleweight (4 rounds)	1st-round KO
(Argentina) Luciano Sanchez	(United States) Adrian Silva	Heavyweight (4 rounds)	2nd-round KO

== Broadcasting ==
Country	Broadcaster
Panama	RPC
United States	Showtime
United Kingdom	YouTube

Preceded by First bout	Jermell Charlo's bouts 14 May 2022	Succeeded by vs. Canelo Álvarez
Preceded by First bout	Brian Castaño's bouts 14 May 2022	Succeeded by TBA
