= Carlos Adames =

Dominican boxer (born 1994)

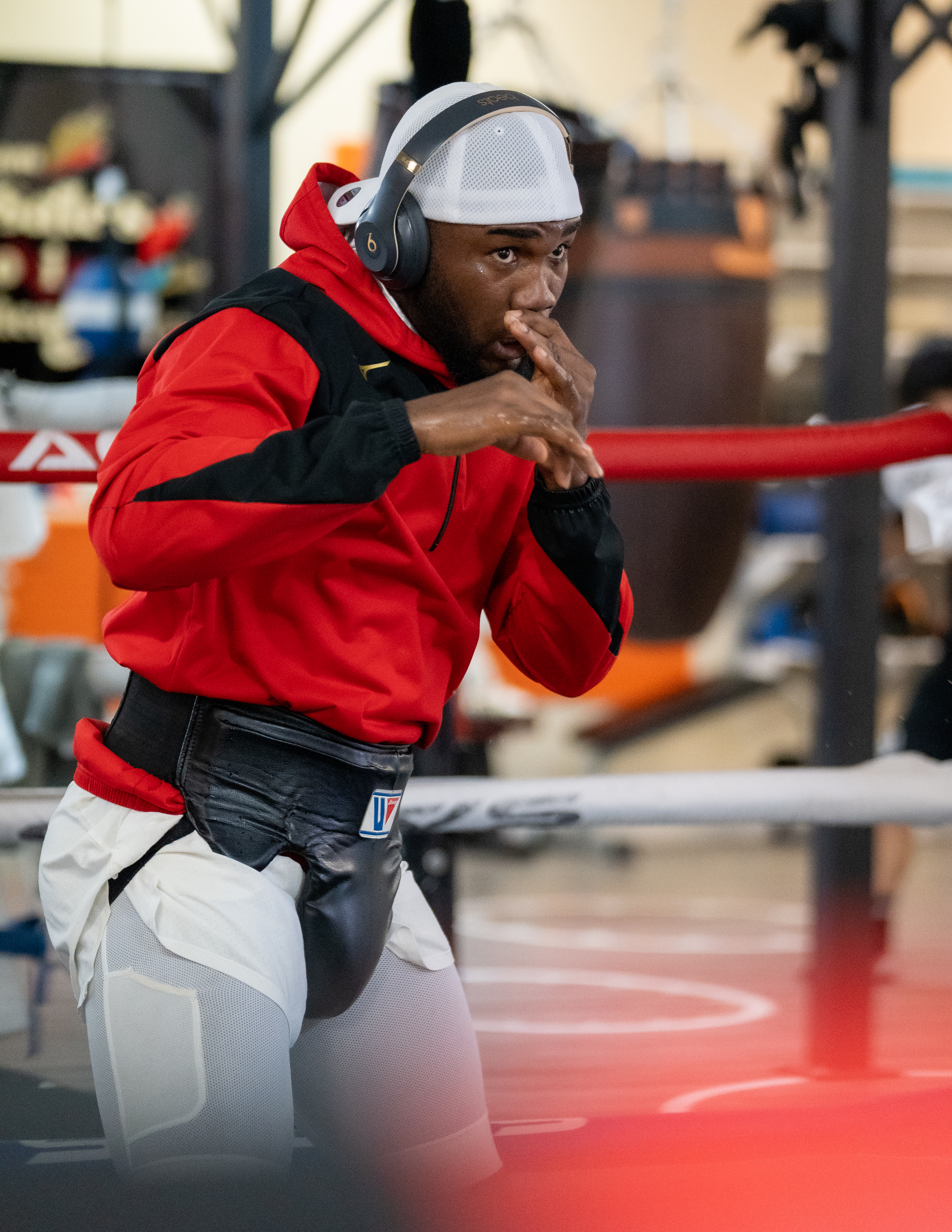

Personal information
- Nationality: Dominican
- Born: 7 May 1994 (age 32) Comendador, Dominican Republic
- Height: 5 ft 11 in (180 cm)
- Weight: Welterweight; Light middleweight; Middleweight

Boxing career
- Reach: 73 in (185 cm)
- Stance: Orthodox (Note: Listed by BoxRec as Orthodox, but regularly switch-hits as a Southpaw)

Boxing record
- Total fights: 28
- Wins: 26
- Win by KO: 18
- Losses: 1
- Draws: 1

Carlos Adames (Spanish pronunciation: [ˈkaɾlos ˈaðames]; born 7 May 1994) is a Dominican professional boxer. He has held the World Boxing Council (WBC) middleweight title since 2024.

== Professional career ==
Adames represented the Dominican Republic in the World Series of Boxing between 2014 and 2015, accumulating a 4–2 record.

=== Adames vs. Souffrant ===
Adames made his professional debut in July 2015, defeating Jeff Souffrant by unanimous decision after four rounds.

=== Adames vs. Figueroa ===
Adames won the vacant WBA Fedecaribe welterweight title in his seventh bout, beating Kelly Figueroa.

=== Adames vs. Lopez ===
He won another vacant title in his next fight, defeating Patrick Lopez with a fourth-round technical knockout for the WBA Fedelatin title.

=== Adames vs. Molina ===
In July 2017, he defeated welterweight contender Carlos Molina by unanimous decision (110–98, 110–98, 109–99) after eleven rounds. Adames put on a dominant performance, dropping Molina in round two and outclassing him through the rest of the fight. However, the fight ended a ten-fight knockout streak for Adames.

On November, Adames was scheduled to face Frank Rojas in a welterweight bout as part of the 96th WBA Convention in Medellín, but the bout was called off after he failed to make weight.

=== Adames vs. Teixeira ===
On 30 November 2019, Adames faced Patrick Teixeira for the vacant WBO interim super welterweight title. Teixeira was ranked #2 by the WBO and #12 by both the WBC and the WBA. Teixeira beat Adames by unanimous decision. The scorecards were announced as 111–116, 113–114, 113–114 in favor of Teixeira.

=== Adames vs. Derevyanchenko ===
On 5 December 2021, Adames fought Sergiy Derevyanchenko. Derevyanchenko was ranked #4 by The Ring, #3 by the WBC and #14 by the WBA at middleweight. Adames beat Derevyanchenko by majority decision, with the scorecards reading 95-95, 93–97, 94–96 in his favor.

=== Adames vs. Montiel ===
On 8 October 2022, at the Dignity Health Sports Park in Carson, California, Adames defeated Juan Macias Montiel by third-round knockout to win the vacant WBC interim middleweight title.

=== Adames vs. Williams ===
Adames made the first defense of his WBC interim middleweight title against Julian Williams on June 24, 2023, at the Minneapolis Armory in Minneapolis, Minnesota, U.S. He won by technical knockout in the ninth round.

=== WBC middleweight champion ===
On May 7, 2024, just mere hours after reigning middleweight champion Jermall Charlo was stripped of the title due to a DWI arrest, the World Boxing Council (WBC) elevated Adames from interim champion to full-fledged champion of the middleweight division.

==== Adames vs. Gausha ====
Adames was scheduled to defend his WBC middleweight title against Terrell Gausha at MGM Grand Garden Arena in Las Vegas on June 15, 2024. He won the fight by unanimous decision.

==== Adames vs. Sheeraz ====
Adames defended his title against unbeaten Hamzah Sheeraz at The Venue Riyadh Season in Riyadh, Saudi Arabia, on 22 February 2025. The fight ended in a split draw with one ringside judge scoring it 118–110 in his favour, another seeing it 115–114 for his opponent, while the third had it a 114–114 draw.

==== Adames vs. Williams ====
Adames was scheduled to defend his WBC middleweight title against Austin Williams at Caribe Royale in Orlando, Florida, on March 21, 2026. He won by unanimous decision.

=== Zuffa Boxing ===
On October 13, 2026, it was announced that Adames had signed a promotional contract with Zuffa Boxing.

==== Adames vs Warburton ====
Adames made his Zuffa Boxing debut against Gerome Warburton in a non-title catchweight 10-round bout at The Venue in Riyadh, Saudi Arabia, on November 14, 2026. He won via unanimous decision.

== Professional boxing record ==
28 fights	26 wins	1 loss
By knockout	18	0
By decision	8	1
Draws	1	

No.	Result	Record	Opponent	Type	Round, time	Date	Location	Notes
27	Win	26–1–1	Gerome Warburton	UD	10	14 Nov 2026	The Venue Riyadh Season, Riyadh, Saudi Arabia	
27	Win	25–1–1	Austin Williams	UD	12	21 Mar 2026	Caribe Royale, Orlando, Florida, US	Retained WBC middleweight title
26	Draw	24–1–1	Hamzah Sheeraz	SD	12	22 Feb 2025	The Venue Riyadh Season, Riyadh, Saudi Arabia	Retained WBC middleweight title
25	Win	24–1	Terrell Gausha	UD	12	15 Jun 2024	MGM Grand Garden Arena, Paradise, Nevada, U.S.	Retained WBC middleweight title
24	Win	23–1	Julian Williams	TKO	9 (12), 2:45	24 Jun 2023	Minneapolis Armory, Minneapolis, Minnesota, U.S.	Retained WBC interim middleweight title
23	Win	22–1	Juan Macias Montiel	KO	3 (12), 2:37	8 Oct 2022	Dignity Health Sports Park, Carson, California, U.S.	Won WBC interim middleweight title
22	Win	21–1	Sergiy Derevyanchenko	MD	10	5 Dec 2021	Staples Center, Los Angeles, California, U.S.	
21	Win	20–1	Alexis Salazar	TKO	3 (10), 2:59	26 Jun 2021	State Farm Arena, Atlanta, Georgia, U.S.	
20	Win	19–1	Byan Medina	TKO	6 (10), 0:17	12 Mar 2021	Hotel Catalonia Malecon Center, Santo Domingo, Dominican Republic	
19	Loss	18–1	Patrick Teixeira	UD	12	30 Nov 2019	Cosmopolitan of Las Vegas, Paradise, Nevada, U.S.	For vacant WBO interim light middleweight title
18	Win	18–0	Patrick Day	UD	10	28 Jun 2019	Pechanga Resort & Casino, Temecula, California, U.S.	Retained NABF and NABO light middleweight titles
17	Win	17–0	Frank Galarza	TKO	4 (10), 1:07	20 Apr 2019	Madison Square Garden, New York City, New York, U.S.	Retained WBC-NABF light middleweight title; Won vacant WBO-NABO light middleweight title
16	Win	16–0	Juan Ruiz	KO	3 (8), 1:57	18 Jan 2019	Turning Stone Resort Casino, Verona, New York, U.S.	
15	Win	15–0	Joshua Conley	TKO	2 (10), 2:17	13 Oct 2018	CHI Health Center, Omaha, Nebraska, U.S.	Won vacant WBC-NABF light middleweight title
14	Win	14–0	Alejandro Barrera	UD	10	12 May 2018	Madison Square Garden, New York City, New York, U.S.	
13	Win	13–0	Adrian Jose Perez Aparicio	RTD	6 (10), 3:00	18 Nov 2017	Hotel Jaragua, Santo Domingo, Dominican Republic	
12	Win	12–0	Carlos Molina	UD	11	26 Jul 2017	Hotel Jaragua, Santo Domingo, Dominican Republic	Retained WBA Fedelatin welterweight title
11	Win	11–0	Jean Carlos Prada	TKO	2 (10), 2:10	24 Feb 2017	Maunaloa Casino, Santo Domingo, Dominican Republic	
10	Win	10–0	John Renteria	KO	1 (11), 2:04	16 Dec 2016	Maunaloa Casino, Santo Domingo, Dominican Republic	Retained WBA Fedelatin welterweight title
9	Win	9–0	Iván Álvarez	RTD	4 (11), 3:00	16 Sep 2016	Hotel Jaragua, Santo Domingo, Dominican Republic	Retained WBA Fedelatin welterweight title
8	Win	8–0	Patrick López	TKO	4 (11), 2:59	15 Apr 2016	Hotel Jaragua, Santo Domingo, Dominican Republic	Won vacant WBA Fedelatin welterweight title
7	Win	7–0	Kelly Figueroa	RTD	4 (9), 3:00	6 Feb 2016	Hotel Jaragua, Santo Domingo, Dominican Republic	Won vacant WBA Fedecaribe welterweight title
6	Win	6–0	Devis Caceres	TKO	2 (6), 2:51	19 Nov 2015	Hotel Jaragua, Santo Domingo, Dominican Republic	
5	Win	5–0	José Vidal Soto	TKO	1 (6), 1:24	22 Oct 2015	Casa de los Clubes, Santo Domingo, Dominican Republic	
4	Win	4–0	Rudy Lozano	TKO	1 (6), 2:38	7 Oct 2015	B.B. King's Blues Club, New York City, New York, U.S.	
3	Win	3–0	Rasheed Lawal	KO	1 (4), 1:52	19 Sep 2015	Resorts World, New York City, New York, U.S.	
2	Win	2–0	Juan Carlos Santos	TKO	2 (4), 2:02	15 Aug 2015	Multiuso Leo Tavarez, Higüey, Dominican Republic	
1	Win	1–0	Jeff Souffrant	UD	4	24 Jul 2015	Masonic Temple, New York City, New York, U.S.	

== See also ==
- List of world middleweight boxing champions

== Notes ==
Sporting positions
Regional boxing titles
Vacant Title last held by Idiozan Matos	WBA Fedacaribe welterweight champion 6 February 2016 – March 2016	Vacant Title next held by John Renteria
Vacant Title last held by Emmanuel de Jesus	WBA Fedelatin welterweight champion 15 April 2016 – November 2017	Vacant Title next held by Ivan Matute
Vacant Title last held by Radzhab Butaev	NABF light-middleweight champion 13 October 2018 – October 2019; Vacated	Vacant Title next held by Travell Mazion
Vacant Title last held by Kanat Islam	NABO light-middleweight champion 20 April – October 2019; Vacated	Vacant Title next held by Xander Zayas
World boxing titles
Vacant Title last held by Jermall Charlo	WBC middleweight champion Interim title 8 October 2022 – 7 May 2024; Promoted	Vacant
Preceded by Jermall Charlo; Stripped	WBC middleweight champion 7 May 2024 – present	Incumbent
