= Split draw =

Outcome in combat sports

A split draw is an outcome in several full-contact combat sports, including boxing, mixed martial arts, and other sports involving striking. In a split draw, one of the three judges scores the contest in favor of one fighter, another judge scores it in favor of the other fighter, and the third judge scores the contest as a draw. The decision is announced as a draw.

== Notable examples ==
Date	Fight	A-side score	Even score	B-side score	Source	Result of rematch(es)
June 12, 1989	Sugar Ray Leonard vs. Thomas Hearns II	Leonard; 113–112	112–112	Hearns; 113–112		No subsequent rematch
December 17, 1994	Bernard Hopkins vs. Segundo Mercado	Hopkins; 114–111	113–113	Mercado; 116–114		Hopkins – TKO 7
March 13, 1999	Evander Holyfield vs. Lennox Lewis	Holyfield; 115–113	115–115	Lewis; 116–113		Lewis – UD
December 15, 2001	John Ruiz vs. Evander Holyfield III	Ruiz; 115–113	114–114	Holyfield; 116–112		No subsequent rematch
May 8, 2004	Juan Manuel Márquez vs. Manny Pacquiao	Márquez; 115–110	113–113	Pacquiao; 115–110		Pacquiao – SD; Pacquiao – MD; Márquez – KO 6
January 1, 2011	Frankie Edgar vs. Gray Maynard II	Edgar; 48–46	47–47	Maynard; 48–46		Edgar – KO 4
September 16, 2017	Canelo Álvarez vs. Gennady Golovkin	Álvarez; 118–110	114–114	Golovkin; 115–113		Álvarez – MD; Álvarez – UD
December 1, 2018	Deontay Wilder vs. Tyson Fury	Wilder; 115–111	113–113	Fury; 114–112		Fury – TKO 7; Fury – KO 11
December 7, 2019	Alexander Povetkin vs. Michael Hunter	Povetkin; 115–113	114–114	Hunter; 115–113		No subsequent rematch
November 28, 2020	Mike Tyson vs. Roy Jones Jr.	Tyson; 79–73	76–76	Jones; 80–76		No subsequent rematch
July 17, 2021	Jermell Charlo vs. Brian Castaño	Charlo; 117–111	114–114	Castaño; 114–113		Charlo – TKO 10
September 16, 2023	Alexa Grasso vs. Valentina Shevchenko	Grasso; 48-47	47-47	Shevchenko; 48-47		Shevchenko – UD

== See also ==
- 10 Point System
