= Pervomayskoye, Kayakentsky District =

Pervomayskoye Первомайское Уьч-Авлакъ
- Selo
- Location within Republic of Dagestan Location within Russia
- Coordinates: 42°29′N 47°53′E
- Country: Russia
- Region: Republic of Dagestan
- District: Kayakentsky District
- Time zone: UTC+3:00

Pervomayskoye (Russian: Первомайское; Kumyk: Уьч-Авлакъ, Üç-Avlaq) is a rural locality (a selo) in Kayakentsky District, Republic of Dagestan, Russia. The population was 8,930 as of 2010. There are 90 streets.

== Geography ==
Pervomayskoye is located 20 km northwest of Novokayakent (the district's administrative centre) by road. Sagasi-Deybuk and Izberbash are the nearest rural localities.

== Nationalities ==
Dargins live there.
