= Middleweight =

Weight class in combat sports

Middleweight is a weight class in combat sports.

== Boxing ==
=== Professional ===
In professional boxing, the middleweight division is contested above 154 lb (70 kg) and up to 160 lb (73 kg).

Early boxing history is less than exact, but the middleweight designation seems to have begun in the 1840s. In the bare-knuckle era, the first middleweight championship fight was between Tom Chandler and Dooney Harris in 1867. Chandler won, becoming known as the American middleweight champion. The first middleweight fight with gloves may have been between George Fulljames and Jack (Nonpareil) Dempsey (no relation to the more famous heavyweight Jack Dempsey).

==== Current world champions ====
Sanctioning Body	Reign Began	Champion	Record	Defenses
WBA	March 9, 2023	Erislandy Lara	32–3–3 (19 KO)	3
WBC	May 7, 2024	Carlos Adames	24–1–1 (18 KO)	2
IBF	August 8, 2026	Aaron Mckenna	21–0 (10 KO)	0
WBO	July 20, 2026	Denzel Bentley	22–3–1 (18 KO)	0

==== Current world rankings ====
===== The Ring =====
As of August 9, 2026.

Keys:

C Current The Ring world champion

Rank	Name	Record	Title(s)
C	vacant		
1	Carlos Adames	25–1–1 (18 KO)	WBC
2	Yoenlis Hernández	10–0 (9 KO)	
3	Erislandy Lara	32–3–3 (19 KO)	WBA
4	Troy Isley	15–0 (5 KO)	
5	Etinosa Oliha	22–1 (9 KO)	
6	Aaron Mckenna	21–0 (10 KO)	IBF
7	Amari Jones	15–0 (13 KO)	
8	Chris Eubank Jr.	35–4 (25 KO)	
9	Jesus Ramos	24–1 (19 KO)	WBC (Interim)
10	Jahi Tucker	17–1–1 (7 KO)	

===== BoxRec =====
As of October 21, 2026.

Rank	Name	Record	Title(s)
1	Erislandy Lara	32–3–3 (19 KO)	WBA
2	Carlos Adames	25–1–1 (18 KO)	WBC
3	Jesus Ramos	24–1 (19 KO)	WBC (Interim)
4	Chris Eubank Jr	35–4 (25 KO)	
5	Callum Walsh	16–0 (11 KO)	
6	Michael Zerafa	34–5 (1) (22 KO)	
7	Shane Mosley Jr.	23–5 (13 KO)	
8	Andreas Katzourakis	17–0 (11 KO)	
9	Amari Jones	17–0 (15 KO)	
10	Vito Mielnicki Jr.	23–1 (13 KO)	

==== Longest reigning world middleweight champions ====
Below is a list of longest reigning middleweight champions in boxing measured by the individual's longest reign. Career total time as champion (for multiple time champions) is not counted.

Rank	Name	Title Reign	Title Recognition	Successful Defenses	Beaten opponents	Fights
1.	Bernard Hopkins	10 years, 2 months, 18 days	IBF, WBA, WBC, WBO	20	17	
2.	Tommy Ryan	8 years, 7 months, 4 days	World	6	6	
3.	Gennady Golovkin	8 years, 1 months, 1 day	WBA (Super), IBF, WBC	20	19	
4.	Tony Zale	6 years, 11 months, 24 days	NBA (current WBA)	4	4	
5.	Carlos Monzón	6 years, 9 months, 9 days	WBA, WBC	14	11	
6.	Marvelous Marvin Hagler	6 years, 7 months, 10 days	WBC, WBA, IBF	12	10	
7.	Nonpareil Jack Dempsey	6 years, 6 months, 15 days	World	2	2	
8.	Felix Sturm	5 years, 4 months, 4 days	WBA	12	10	
9.	Jermall Charlo	7 years, 3 months, 3 weeks and 1 day	WBC	4	4	
10.	Demetrius Andrade	3 years, 10 month, 12 days	WBO	5	5	
11.	Bob Fitzsimmons	3 years, 8 months, 12 days	World	1	1	
12.	Erislandy Lara	3 years, 7 months, 1 week and 5 days	WBA	3	3	
13.	Arthur Abraham	3 years, 7 months, 2 days	IBF	10	10	

Active Title Reign
Reign has ended

=== Amateur ===
==== Olympic champions ====
- 1904: Charles Mayer (USA)
- 1908: John Douglas (GBR)
- 1920: Harry Mallin (GBR)
- 1924: Harry Mallin (GBR)
- 1928: Piero Toscani (ITA)
- 1932: Carmen Barth (USA)
- 1936: Jean Despeaux (FRA)
- 1948: László Papp (HUN)
- 1952: Floyd Patterson (USA)
- 1956: Gennadiy Shatkov (URS)
- 1960: Eddie Crook, Jr. (USA)
- 1964: Valeriy Popenchenko (URS)
- 1968: Chris Finnegan (GBR)
- 1972: Vyacheslav Lemeshev (URS)
- 1976: Michael Spinks (USA)
- 1980: José Gómez Mustelier (CUB)
- 1984: Shin Joon-Sup (KOR)
- 1988: Henry Maske (GDR)
- 1992: Ariel Hernández (CUB)
- 1996: Ariel Hernández (CUB)
- 2000: Jorge Gutiérrez (CUB)
- 2004: Gaydarbek Gaydarbekov (RUS)
- 2008: James DeGale (GBR)
- 2012: Ryota Murata (JPN)
- 2016: Arlen López (CUB)
- 2020: Hebert Conceição (BRA)

== Kickboxing ==
- International Kickboxing Federation (IKF) Middleweight (Pro & Amateur) 159.1–165 lb. or 72.4–75 kg
- In Glory promotion, a middleweight division is up to 85 kg (187 lb).
- In Bellator Kickboxing promotion, a middleweight division is up to 85 kg (187 lb).
- In ONE Championship, the middleweight division limit is 93 kg (205 lb).

== Bare-knuckle boxing ==
The limit for middleweight generally differs among promotions in bare-knuckle boxing:

- In Bare Knuckle Fighting Championship, the middleweight division has an upper limit of 175 lb (79 kg).
- In BYB Extreme Fighting Series, the middleweight division has an upper limit of 160 lb (73 kg).
- In BKB™, the middleweight division has an upper limit of 89 kg (196 lb).

== Lethwei ==
The World Lethwei Championship recognizes the middleweight division with an upper limit of 75 kg (165 lb). In World Lethwei Championship, Naimjon Tuhtaboyev is the Middleweight Champion.

== Mixed Martial Arts ==
In MMA, the middleweight division is from 171 lb (77.5 kg) to 185 lb (84 kg).

Anderson Silva is generally considered to be the greatest Middleweight MMA fighter of all time.

== Taekwondo ==
Category	Men's	Women's	Competitions	Note
Middleweight	78–84 kg	67–72 kg	World Championships, Continental Championships, Asian Games	since 1999
Middleweight	76–83 kg	65–70 kg	World Championships, Continental Championships, Asian Games	until 1998
Middleweight	68–80 kg	57–67 kg	Olympic Games, Pan Am Games, All-Africa Games	
