= Gennady Golovkin vs. David Lemieux =

Boxing Match

- Date: October 17, 2015
- Venue: Madison Square Garden New York City, New York, U.S.
- Title(s) on the line: WBC interim, WBA (Super), IBF, and IBO middleweight titles

Tale of the tape
Boxer	Gennady Golovkin	David Lemieux
Nickname	"GGG"	
Hometown	Karagandy, Karaganda Region, Kazakhstan	Montreal, Quebec, Canada
Purse	$2,000,000	$1,500,000
Pre-fight record	33–0 (30 KO)	34–2 (31 KO)
Age	33 years, 6 months	26 years, 9 months
Height	5 ft 10 1/2 in (179 cm)	5 ft 9 1/2 in (177 cm)
Weight	159.4 lb (72 kg)	159.8 lb (72 kg)
Style	Orthodox	Orthodox
Recognition	WBA (Super), IBO and WBC interim Middleweight Champion; The Ring/TBRB; No. 1 Ranked Middleweight; The Ring No. 4 ranked pound-for-pound fighter	IBF; Middleweight Champion; The Ring/TBRB; No. 4 Ranked Middleweight

Result
- Golovkin wins via 8th-round TKO

Gennady Golovkin vs. David Lemieux was a professional boxing match contested on October 17, 2015, for the WBA, IBF, IBO and WBC interim middleweight championship.

== Background ==
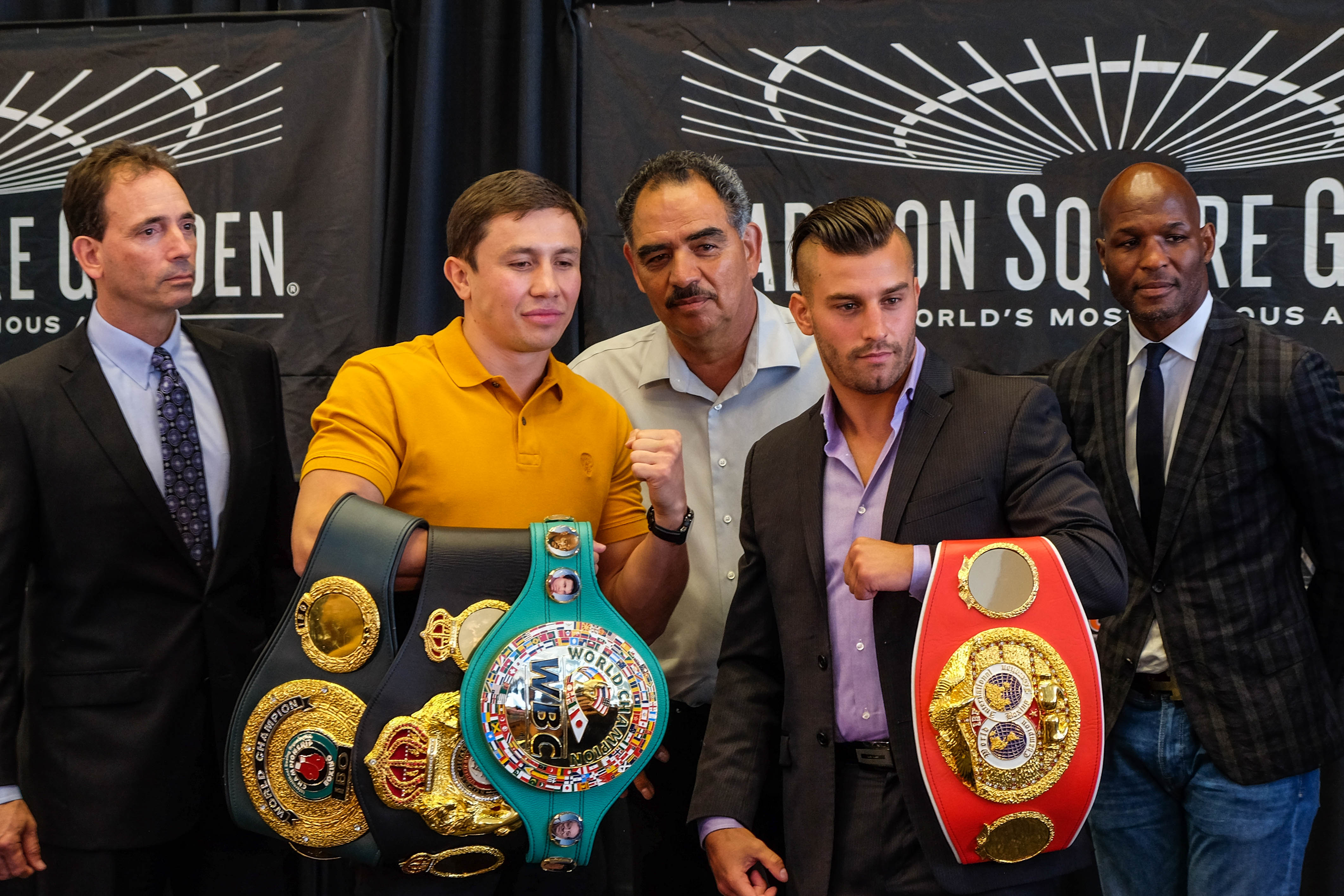
Golovkin and Lemieux Press Conference 18 August 2015

It was announced in July 2015 that WBA middleweight champion Gennady Golovkin would make the 10th defence of his world title in an unification fight against IBF champion David Lemieux at the Madison Square Garden in New York City on 17 October, live on HBO Pay-Per-View. Lemieux had won the then vacant IBF title by outpointing Hassan N'Dam N'Jikam in June 2015.

The card was promoted by Golden Boy Promotions and K2 Promotions.

== The fight ==
Golovkin established the pace with his jab while landing his power shots in between, keeping Lemieux off-balance the entire night. Lemieux was dropped by a body shot in the fifth round and sustained an additional punch to the head after he had taken a knee. He was badly staggered in the eighth, so the referee was forced to halt the bout, giving Golovkin a TKO victory. Golovkin landed 280 of 549 punches thrown (51%) whilst Lemieux landed 89 of 335 (27%).

== Aftermath ==
The PPV buys were 150,000. Tom Loefler of K2 Promotions said after the GGG vs. Jacobs fight that GGG vs. Lemieux did 163,000 PPV buys.

== Undercard ==
Confirmed bouts:

Weight Class	Weight		vs.		Method	Round	Time	Notes
Middleweight	160 lbs.	(Kazakhstan) Gennady Golovkin (c)	def.	(Canada) David Lemieux (c)	TKO	8/12	1:32	^{Note 1}
Flyweight	112 lbs.	(Nicaragua) Román González (c)	def.	(United States) Brian Viloria	TKO	9/12	2:53	^{Note 2}
Heavyweight	200+ lbs.	(Cuba) Luis Ortiz	def.	(Argentina) Matias Ariel Vidondo	KO	3/12	0:17	^{Note 3}
Middleweight	160 lbs.	(The Bahamas) Tureano Johnson	def.	(Republic of Ireland) Eamonn O'Kane	UD	12/12
Junior welterweight	140 lbs.	(United States) Maurice Hooker	def.	(Democratic Republic of the Congo) Ghislain Maduma	SD	10/10
Lightweight	135 lbs.	(United States) Lamont Roach Jr.	def.	(Mexico) Jose Bustos	UD	6/6
Junior welterweight	140 lbs.	(Kazakhstan) Ruslan Madiev	def.	(United States) Sean Gee	UD	4/4

^Note 1 For WBC interim, WBA (Super), IBF, and IBO middleweight titles.
^Note 2 For WBC flyweight title.
^Note 3 For WBA interim heavyweight title.

== Broadcasting ==
Country	Broadcaster
Germany	SAT 1
Hungary	Sport 1
Latin America	Canal Space
Panama	RPC
Poland	Polsat Sport
United Kingdom	BoxNation
United States	HBO

Preceded by vs. Willie Monroe Jr.	Gennady Golovkin's bouts 17 October 2015	Succeeded by vs. Dominic Wade
Preceded by vs. Hassan N'Dam N'Jikam	David Lemieux's bouts 17 October 2015	Succeeded by vs. Glen Tapia
