= David Lemieux =

David Lemieux may refer to:

- David Lemieux (archivist) (born 1970), Canadian audio and film archivist
- David Lemieux (boxer) (born 1988), Canadian boxer
