= Eamonn O'Kane =

Irish boxer (born 1982)

Personal information
- Nickname: King Kane
- Nationality: Irish
- Born: 18 March 1982 (age 44) Banagher, County Londonderry; Northern Ireland
- Height: 176 cm (5 ft 9 in)
- Weight: Middleweight

Boxing career
- Stance: Orthodox

Boxing record
- Total fights: 17
- Wins: 14
- Win by KO: 5
- Losses: 2
- Draws: 1
Medal record
Men's amateur boxing
Representing Ireland
European Amateur Boxing Championships
Bronze medal – third place	Liverpool 2008	Middleweight
Representing Northern Ireland
Commonwealth Games
Gold medal – first place	Delhi 2010	Middleweight

Eamonn O'Kane (born 18 March 1982) is a former professional boxer from Northern Ireland who competed from 2011 to 2015. At regional level, he held the Irish middleweight title in 2013, and won the Prizefighter series in 2012.

== Amateur career ==
As captain of the Northern Irish team, O'Kane won the gold medal at the 2010 Commonwealth Games in the middleweight division.

=== Commonwealth Games results ===
2010

- Defeated Ranil Jayathilakage (Sri Lanka) 5–0
- Defeated Nathon McKwen (New Zealand) 9–2
- Defeated Afaese Fata (Samoa) 7–2
- Defeated Keiran Harding (Wales) 12–6
- Defeated Anthony Ogogo (England) 16–4

== Professional career ==
In May 2012, O'Kane won the Prizefighter 24: All-Irish Middleweights tournament, defeating Anthony Fitzgerald via split decision in the quarter-finals, Ryan Greene via first-round technical knockout in the semi-finals and JJ McDonagh via unanimous decision in the final.

== Professional boxing record ==
17 fights, 14 wins (5 knockouts), 2 losses, 1 draw
Res.	Record	Opponent	Type	Rd., Time	Date	Location	Notes
Loss	14–2–1	(The Bahamas) Tureano Johnson	UD	12	17 Oct 2015	(United States) Madison Square Garden, New York City, New York	IBF Middleweight title eliminator.
Win	14–1–1	(United Kingdom) Lewis Taylor	MD	12	2015-05-02	(United Kingdom) Lavey Centre, Derry, Northern Ireland	Retained IBF Inter-Continental Middleweight title.
Win	13–1–1	(Hungary) Ferenc Hafner	TKO	4 (6), 1:32	2015-02-13	(United Kingdom) Oasis Leisure Centre, Swindon, Wiltshire	
Draw	12–1–1	(Lithuania) Virgilijus Stapulionis	TD	4 (12), 2:47	2014-09-06	(United Kingdom) Titanic Quarter, Belfast, Northern Ireland	Retained IBF Inter-Continental Middleweight title.
Win	12–1	(Mexico) Álvaro Gaona	KO	1 (10), 2:42	2014-04-04	(United Kingdom) Odyssey Arena, Belfast, Northern Ireland	Won vacant WBC International Silver Middleweight title.
Win	11–1	(United Kingdom) Kerry Hope	UD	12	2013-10-19	(United Kingdom) Odyssey Arena, Belfast, Northern Ireland	Won vacant IBF Inter-Continental Middleweight title.
Win	10–1	(Republic of Ireland) Anthony Fitzgerald	PTS	10	2013-07-12	(Republic of Ireland) Fairways Hotel, Dundalk, Ireland	Won vacant Irish Middleweight title.
Win	9–1	(United Kingdom) Gary Boulden	PTS	6	2013-02-09	(United Kingdom) Odyssey Arena, Belfast, Northern Ireland	
Loss	8–1	(United Kingdom) John Ryder	TKO	8 (10), 1:33	2012-12-08	(United Kingdom) Olympia, Kensington, London, England	British Middleweight title eliminator.
Win	8–0	(United Kingdom) Terry Carruthers	PTS	6	2012-09-22	(United Kingdom) Odyssey Arena, Belfast, Northern Ireland	
Win	7–0	(Republic of Ireland) JJ McDonagh	UD	3	2012-05-05	(United Kingdom) King's Hall, Belfast, Northern Ireland	Prizefighter 24: All-Irish Middleweights Final.
Win	6–0	(United Kingdom) Ryan Greene	TKO	1 (3), 2:22	2012-05-05	(United Kingdom) King's Hall, Belfast, Northern Ireland	Prizefighter 24: All-Irish Middleweights Semi-Final.
Win	5–0	(Republic of Ireland) Anthony Fitzgerald	SD	3	2012-05-05	(United Kingdom) King's Hall, Belfast, Northern Ireland	Prizefighter 24: All-Irish Middleweights Quarter-Final.
Win	4–0	(United Kingdom) Wayne Reed	PTS	6	17 Mar 2012	(United Kingdom) Motorpoint Arena Sheffield, Sheffield, England	
Win	3–0	(United Kingdom) Joe Rea	PTS	8	2011-09-10	(United Kingdom) Odyssey Arena, Belfast, Northern Ireland	
Win	2–0	(Republic of Ireland) Tommy Tolan	RTD	5 (6), 3:00	2011-06-25	(United Kingdom) Craigavon Leisure Centre, Craigavon, Northern Ireland	
Win	1–0	(Lithuania) Dmitrij Kalinovskij	TKO	1 (4), 2:33	2011-06-04	(United Kingdom) Motorpoint Arena Cardiff, Cardiff, Wales	Professional debut.
