= Makoto Fuchigami =

Japanese boxer

Personal information
- Born: July 30, 1983 (age 42) Akune, Kagoshima, Japan
- Height: 5 ft 11 in (1.80 m)

Boxing career

Boxing record
- Total fights: 35
- Wins: 23
- Win by KO: 14
- Losses: 12

Makoto Fuchigami (淵上 誠, Fuchigami Makoto) is a Japanese professional boxer. He has 23 wins, 12 losses, with 14 of those wins coming by way of knockout. He fights in the middleweight division. Fuchigami became the Japanese middleweight champion in 2010. On May 12, 2012, Fuchigami fought Gennady Golovkin for the WBA and IBO Middleweight championship of the world in Kyiv, Ukraine. Fuchigami was defeated by TKO in the third round.
