= Gennady Golovkin =

Kazakhstani boxer (born 1982)

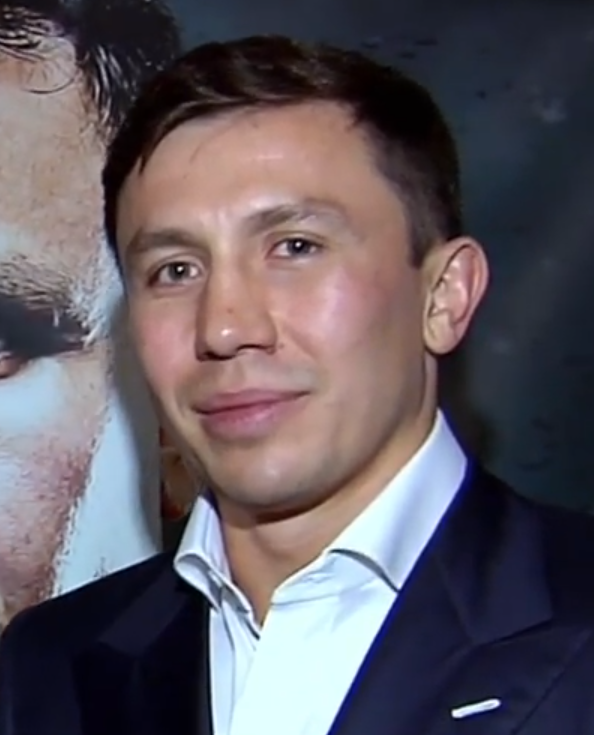
- Golovkin in 2017

Personal information
- Native name: Геннадий Геннадьевич Головкин
- Nickname: GGG ("Triple G")
- Nationality: Kazakh
- Born: Gennady Gennadyevich Golovkin; 8 April 1982 (age 44) Karaganda, Kazakh SSR, Soviet Union
- Height: 5 ft 10 1/2 in (179 cm)
- Weight: Middleweight; Super middleweight

Boxing career
- Reach: 70 in (178 cm)
- Stance: Orthodox

Boxing record
- Total fights: 45
- Wins: 42
- Win by KO: 37
- Losses: 2
- Draws: 1
Medal record
Men's amateur boxing
Representing Kazakhstan
Olympic Games
Silver medal – second place	2004 Athens	Middleweight
World Championships
Gold medal – first place	2003 Bangkok	Middleweight
Junior World Championships
Gold medal – first place	2000 Budapest	Light welterweight
World Cup
Silver medal – second place	2002 Astana	Light middleweight
Bronze medal – third place	2005 Moscow	Middleweight
Asian Games
Gold medal – first place	2002 Busan	Light middleweight
Asian Championships
Gold medal – first place	2004 Puerto Princesa	Middleweight
East Asian Games
Gold medal – first place	2001 Osaka	Welterweight

Gennadiy Gennadyevich Golovkin (Cyrillic: Геннадий Геннадьевич Головкин; also spelled Gennadiy; born 8 April 1982), often known by his nickname "GGG" or "Triple G", is a Kazakh former professional boxer who competed from 2006 to 2022. He has held multiple middleweight world championships, and is a two-time former unified champion. He held the World Boxing Association (WBA) (Super version), World Boxing Council (WBC) and International Boxing Federation (IBF) titles at varying points between 2014 and 2023, and challenged once for the undisputed super middleweight championship in 2022. He is also a former International Boxing Organization (IBO) middleweight champion, having held the title twice between 2011 and 2023. Golovkin was inducted into the International Boxing Hall of Fame in 2026.

Golovkin was ranked as the world's best boxer, pound for pound, from September 2017 to September 2018 by The Ring magazine. He was also ranked as the world's best active middleweight by The Ring, Transnational Boxing Rankings Board, ESPN, and BoxRec. His 20 consecutive middleweight title defenses are tied with Bernard Hopkins for the most in the division's history.

In 2010, Golovkin won the WBA interim middleweight title by defeating Milton Núñez. WBA later elevated him to Regular champion status in 2012. He won the IBO title the following year. In 2014, Golovkin was elevated to the status of WBA (Super) champion and successfully defended both his titles against Daniel Geale. Later that year he would go on to defeat Marco Antonio Rubio to win the WBC interim middleweight title, and in 2015 he would defeat David Lemieux for the IBF middleweight title. After Canelo Álvarez vacated his WBC middleweight title in 2016, Golovkin was elevated to full champion and held three of the four major world titles in boxing. Golovkin lost all his titles, including his undefeated record, following his highly controversial first loss to Álvarez in 2018. He regained his IBF and IBO titles by defeating Sergiy Derevyanchenko in 2019, and regained his WBA (Super) title by defeating Ryōta Murata in 2022 at age 40.

In his amateur career, Golovkin won a gold medal in the middleweight division at the 2003 World Championships. He went on to represent Kazakhstan at the 2004 Summer Olympics, winning a middleweight silver medal. Golovkin was appointed President of the National Olympic Committee of the Republic of Kazakhstan in 2024. He was appointed president of the World Boxing in 2025 after he played a key role in keeping Olympic boxing.

== Early life ==
Golovkin was born in the city of Karaganda in the Kazakh SSR, Soviet Union (present-day Kazakhstan) to a Russian coal miner father and an ethnic Korean mother, who worked as an assistant in a chemical laboratory. Golovkin's maternal grandfather, Sergey Pak, was an ethnic Korean living in Soviet Russia, who was forcefully moved to Kazakhstan.

He has three brothers, two elder named Sergey and Vadim and a twin, Max. Sergey and Vadim had encouraged Golovkin to start boxing when Golovkin was eight years old. As a youth, Golovkin would walk the streets with them, who went around picking fights for him with grown men. When asked, "Are you afraid of him?", Golovkin would respond "No", and be told to fight. "My brothers, they were doing that from when I was in kindergarten," Golovkin said. "Every day, different guys." When Golovkin was nine years old, Golovkin's two older brothers joined the Soviet Army. In 1990, the government had informed Golovkin's family that Vadim was dead. In 1994, the government told Golovkin's family that Sergey was dead.

Golovkin's first boxing gym was in Maikuduk, Karaganda, Kazakhstan, where his first boxing coach was Victor Dmitriev, whom he regards as "very good". A month after he first entered the gym, at age 10, the trainer ordered him to step into the ring to check his skills and he lost his first fight.

== Amateur career ==
Golovkin began boxing competitively in 1993, age 11, winning the local Karaganda Regional tournament in the cadet division. It took several years before he was allowed to compete against seniors, and seven years before he was accepted to the Kazakhstani national boxing team, and began competing internationally. In the meantime he graduated from the Karagandy State University Athletics and Sports Department, receiving a degree and a PE teacher qualification. He became a scholarship holder with the Olympic Solidarity program in November 2002.

"350 amateur fights, he knows what to do against anything."

— Roy Jones Jr. on Golovkin's ring experience.

At the 2003 World Amateur Boxing Championships in Bangkok, he won the gold medal beating future two-time champion Matvey Korobov (RUS) 19–10, Andy Lee (29–9), Lucian Bute (stoppage), Yordanis Despaigne in the semi-finals (29–26) and Oleg Mashkin in the finals. Upon his victory at the 2003 Championships, a boxing commentator calling the bout for NTV Plus Sports, said: "Golovkin. Remember that name! We sure will hear it again."

He fought 350 bouts, winning 345, and served as the long-time captain of Kazakhstan’s national team.

== Professional career ==
=== Early career ===
After ending his amateur career in 2005, Golovkin signed with the Universum Box-Promotion (UBP) and made his professional debut in May 2006 his first professional trainer was the German Tajik Magomed Schaburow a former amateur boxer. By the end of 2008, Golovkin's record stood at 14–0 (11 KO) and while he had few wins over boxers regarded as legitimate contenders, he was regarded as one of the best prospects in the world. Golovkin was given 4 more relatively easy bouts in 2009. In 2010, Universum started to run into financial issues after having been dropped by German television channel ZDF. This caused a number of issues for Golovkin who was effectively unable to fight in Germany, and contract disputes between the two parties got complicated.

Golovkin terminated his contract with Universum in January 2010 and stated the following in an interview: "The reason for this decision is that I've always been placed behind Felix Sturm and Sebastian Zbik by Universum. Our demands to fight against Felix Sturm or Sebastian Zbik have been always rejected on absurd grounds. Universum had no real plan or concept for me, they did not even try to bring my career forward. They would rather try to prevent me from winning a title as long as Sturm and Zbik are champions. Further more, bouts against well-known and interesting opponents were held out in prospect, but nothing happened. This situation was not acceptable. It was time to move forward."

After cutting ties with Universum, the WBA issued an interim title fight between Golovkin, ranked #1 at the time, and Milton Núñez (21–1–1, 19 KOs), who was ranked 13th at the time by the WBA. Golovkin routed Núñez, defeating him in 58 seconds to win the interim title. He tried to fight WBA (Super) champion Felix Sturm and Hassan N'Dam N'Jikam during this time, but was unable to get them in the ring. Oleg Hermann, Golovkin's manager, said "It is very hard to find a good opponent. Everybody knows that Felix Sturm is afraid of Gennady. Strictly speaking, Sturm should get out of boxing and become a marathon runner because he is running fast and long. He has an excellent chance to become a champion in athletics."

=== Fighting in the United States ===
Golovkin was determined to become a worldwide name, dreaming of following in the Klitschko brothers' footsteps by fighting in Madison Square Garden and Staples Center. He signed with K2 Promotions and went into training in Big Bear, California, with Abel Sanchez, the veteran trainer behind Hall of Famer Terry Norris and many other top talents. At first, Sanchez was misled by Golovkin's humble appearance: "I looked at him, I thought: 'Man! This guy is a choir boy!'." But soon he was stunned by and impressed with Golovkin's talent and attitude from their first meeting. He has since then worked to add Mexican-style aggression to Golovkin's Eastern European-style amateur discipline, thereby producing a formidable hybrid champion. "I have a chalkboard in the gym, and I wrote Ali's name, Manny Pacquiao's name and his name," Sanchez said. "I told him, 'You could be right there.' He was all sheepish, but once I felt his hands, and I saw how smart he was in the ring and how he caught on... sheesh. He's going to be the most-avoided fighter in boxing, or he's going to get the chance he deserves."

Golovkin was scheduled to make his HBO debut against Dmitry Pirog (20–0, 15 KOs) in August 2012. Pirog had vacated his WBO middleweight title to face Golovkin. This was because Pirog had been mandated to fight interim champion Hassan N'Dam N'Jikam. Weeks before the fight, it was announced that Pirog had suffered a back injury—a ruptured disc—that would prevent him from fighting on the scheduled date, but Golovkin would still face another opponent on HBO. Several comeback attempts by Pirog were thwarted by ongoing back problems, effectively forcing his premature retirement.

==== Golovkin vs. Proksa, Rosado ====
"Oh my goodness . . . There's a monster in the middleweight division!"

— Max Kellerman on the U.S. debut of Golovkin

On 20 July 2012, it was announced that Golovkin would defend his titles against European champion and The Ring's #10-rated middleweight Grzegorz Proksa (28–1, 21 KOs) on 1 September at the Turning Stone Casino in Verona, New York. The fight was televised on HBO in the United States and Sky Sports in the UK. Golovkin put on an impressive performance in his American debut by battering Proksa to a fifth-round technical knockout (TKO), which was Proksa's first loss by knockout. Proksa praised Golovkin's power, "The guy hits like a hammer. I tried everything, but it did not work. You have to give him credit, because he had a good handle on the situation and it was an honor to meet him in the ring." CompuBox Stats showed that Golovkin landed 101 of 301 punches thrown (34%) and Proksa landed 38 of his 217 thrown (18%). In October, when the WBA (Super) middleweight champion Daniel Geale signed to fight Anthony Mundine in a rematch, the WBA stripped Geale of the title and named Golovkin the sole WBA champion at middleweight.

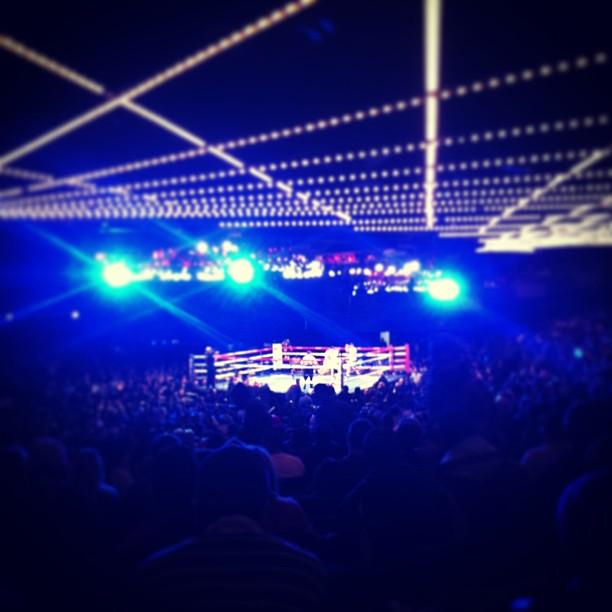
Distant view of Golovkin fighting against Gabriel Rosado at Madison Square Garden in January 2013

On 30 November 2012, it was announced that Golovkin would next fight The Ring's #9-rated light middleweight Gabriel Rosado (21–5, 13 KO) on the HBO Salido-Garcia card in the co-main event. On 19 January 2012, it was said that Golovkin would agree a catchweight of 158 pounds, two pounds below the middleweight limit. Rosado later rejected the proposal, stating he would fight at the full 160 pound limit.

Golovkin continued his stoppage-streak with a TKO victory over Rosado. The fight was halted when Rosado's corner threw in the towel to save Rosado, who was battered and bleeding heavily from his nose and left eye. At the time of the stoppage, Golovkin led on the judges' scorecards 60–54, 60–54, and 59–55. According to CompuBox Stats, Golovkin landed 208 of 492 punches thrown (42%) and Rosado landed only 76 of his 345 thrown (22%).

==== Golovkin vs. Ishida, Macklin ====
It was first reported on 31 January 2013, that a deal was close for Golovkin to defend his world titles against former WBA interim super welterweight champion Nobuhiro Ishida (24–8–2, 9 KO) in Monte Carlo on 30 March. Ishida had lost his last two fights, but had never been stopped in his 13-year career. Golovkin became the first to knock out Ishida, in what was said to be a 'stay busy fight', finishing him in the third round with a vicious overhand right. The referee did not begin a count and immediately waved an end to the bout.

Golovkin fought British former two-time world title challenger Matthew Macklin (29–4, 20 KOs) at the MGM Grand at Foxwoods Resort in Mashantucket, Connecticut on 29 June 2013. The fight was officially announced in April. Macklin previously lost back to back world title fights against Felix Sturm and Sergio Martinez in 2011 and 2012, respectively. Golovkin stated that he wanted to fight a further two times in 2013. This was rare to hear from a world champion as majority fight only 2 or 3 times a year. There was a total of 2,211 fans in attendance. Macklin was billed as Golovkin's toughest opponent to date. In round 1, Golovkin landed clean with his right hand and sent Macklin against the ropes, although it could have been ruled a knockdown because it appeared that only the roped kept Macklin on his feet, referee Eddie Cotton, ruled out the knockdown. Golovkin dominated the first two rounds. In the third round, Golvokin landed a right uppercut followed by a left hook to the body. Macklin, in pain, was counted out and the fight was stopped at 1 minute 22 seconds of the round. Macklin called Golovkin the best opponent he has fought in the post-fight interview. Golovkin retained his WBA and IBO world titles. CompuBox Stats showed that Golovkin landed 58 of 116 punches thrown (50%) and Macklin landed 29 of 118 (25%). He earned $350,000 compared to the $300,000 earned by Macklin. The fight averaged 1.1 million viewers.

==== Golovkin vs. Stevens ====
On 18 August 2013, Sports Illustrated announced that Golvokin would next defend with world titles against The Ring's #9-rated middleweight Curtis Stevens (25–3, 18 KO) at the Madison Square Garden Theater in Manhattan, New York, on 2 November. At the time, Stevens was ranked #5 WBC and #6 IBF. Main Events, who promote Stevens, initially turned down a $300,000 offer. It was likely K2 promotions offered an increase to get Stevens in the ring with Golovkin.

In front of 4,618, Golovkin successfully retained his titles against Stevens via an eighth-round technical knockout, methodically breaking down the latter with many ferocious punches to the head and body. Stevens went down hard in the 2nd from two left hooks to the head, and after watching their fighter absorb enormous punishment Stevens' corner called for a halt in the 8th. At the time of stoppage, Golovkin was ahead 80–71, 79–71, and 79–72. The event captured huge interest around the world, with it is broadcast in more than 100 countries worldwide, including Sky Sports in the United Kingdom, Channel 1 in Russia and Polsat TV in Poland. The win was Golovkin's 15th straight stoppage victory and further cemented his status as one of the greatest finishers in the middleweight division. After the fight, Golovkin said, "He was strong, and I was a little cautious of his strength, but I felt comfortable in there and never felt like I was in any trouble [...] I am ready to fight anybody, but, specifically, I want to fight lineal champion Sergio Martinez."

CompuBox Stats showed that Golovkin landed 293 of 794 punches thrown (37%), which included 49% of power punches landed, while Stevens landed 97 of 303 thrown (32%). Golovkin's purse was $400,000 while Stevens received $290,000. The fight averaged 1.41 million viewers on HBO and peaked at 1.566 million.

Golovkin's camp requested that he be awarded the WBA (Super) middleweight title in December 2013, but this was refused by the WBA, as Golovkin was already granted special permission for a fight prior to his mandatory commitment.

==== Golovkin vs. Adama ====
Golovkin's next title defense took place in Monte Carlo against former title challenger Osumanu Adama (22–3, 16 KO) on 1 February 2014. HBO released a statement on 22 January confirming they could not televise the bout in the US. The reason stated was because of the size of the venue Salle des Etoiles and production issues. Coming into the fight, Adama was ranked #12 by the WBA. Golovkin won via seventh-round stoppage. At the end of the 1st round, Golovkin dropped Adama with a solid jab and right hand. Golovkin went on to drop Adama again in the 6th by landing two sharp left hooks to his head, and then again in the 7th with a hard jab. Golovkin then nailed Adama with a left hook to the jaw, sending Adama staggering and forcing the referee to stop the bout. When the reporter asked Golovkin, after the fight, who he would to fight next, he replied, "I want to fight Sergio Martinez to prove who's the best middleweight." At the time of stoppage, one judge had it 60–52 and the other two at 59–53 in favor of Golovkin.

A day after defeating Adama, a fight with Irish boxer Andy Lee (31–2, 22 KOs) was being discussed for 26 April, which was the next time Golovkin would appear on HBO at the Theater at Madison Square Garden. It was reported on 28 February that a deal was close to being made, however on 1 March, the fight was called off when Golovkin's father died after suffering a heart attack, aged 68. Due to beliefs, they have a 40-day mourning period, K2 director Tom Loeffler explained.

=== Unified middleweight champion ===
"He's number one. I like him. I like the way he fights. If you watch him, see how he controls the ring, and how he cuts the ring off, and the way he sets people up for the big shots, he's much more intelligent fighter than people realize, he's very, very clever. I like it. I try to teach what he does to all my fighters, and not everyone can do it, but he's amazing at it. Ring generalship, no one thinks about it, 'cause nobody knows of it anymore, but it's the first thing I was taught by my trainer Eddie Futch, and it stuck with me my whole life: If you put yourself in a good position ninety percent of the time, ya'll win ninety percent of the fights, I promise you. That's what he does."

— Freddie Roach on Golovkin being the world's #1 pound-for-pound.

On 3 June 2014, after ten successful title defenses, the World Boxing Association officially elevated Golovkin from Regular middleweight champion to Super champion. Golovkin was also granted a special permission to defend his title against Daniel Geale. Golovkin had been previously ordered to face #2 Jarrod Fletcher.

==== Golovkin vs. Geale ====
K2 Promotions announced Golovkin would fight against The Ring's #2-rated middleweight Daniel Geale (30–2, 16 KOs) at the Madison Square Garden Theater in New York on 26 July 2014, live on HBO. In front of 8,572 at The Theater, Golovkin successfully defended his title, defeating Geale via a third round stoppage. Golovkin dropped Geale in the second round. A right hand in the third sent Geale down again from which he never recovered completely. A staggering Geale prompted a swift stoppage from referee Michael Ortega. Geale's defeat started from a stiff Golovkin Jab, according to GGG's trainer Abel Sanchez, "Gennady hit him with a jab in the second round and that was a telling point." The accuracy of punches by both fighters were at the 29% mark by Compubox, but the effectiveness of those that connected resulted in a noteworthy win for Golovkin in his record. Golovkin earned $750,000 compared to Geale who received $600,000. The fight averaged 984,000 viewers and peaked 1.048 million viewers on HBO. This was a big dip compared to what Golovkin achieved against Stevens, the last time he appeared on HBO.

==== Golovkin vs. Rubio ====
On 12 August 2014, it was rumored that Golovkin would next fight former multiple time world title challenger and then Interim WBC champion Marco Antonio Rubio (59–6–1, 51 KO). On 20 August, the fight between Golovkin and Rubio was made official. K2 Promotions announced the fight would place on 18 October 2014, on HBO at the StubHub Center in Carson, California. It would mark the first time Golovkin would fight in the West Coast. Golovkin spoke to ESPN about the announcement, "I'm very excited to fight in California. I always enjoy attending fights at the StubHub Center and look forward to a Mexican-style fight against Marco Antonio Rubio." Rubio failed to make weight, weighing in at 161.8 pounds, thus losing the Interim WBC title on the scales. Rubio was given the 2 hour timescales to lose the extra weight, but decided against this. The fight still went ahead.

The record attendance of 9,323 was announced. Golovkin outworked Rubio in a competitive first round, landing more punches. In the second round, Golovkin landed an overhand power left to the head of Rubio with Rubio on the ropes. Rubio then went to his back on the canvas, and took the full ten count in Spanish from referee Jack Reiss. After the knockout, Rubio got up and was motioning with a glove to the back of his head to the referee. However, the knockout blow was clean, and the count, which was given in Spanish was of normal speed. Golovkin retained his WBA (Super) and IBO middleweight titles and won the WBC Interim title which made him mandatory challenger to full titleholder Miguel Cotto. Golovkin in the post fight showed respect, "Rubio, he does not step back. He is a good fighter. I respect him. It was a very hard punch." Rubio earned $350,000 after having to forfeit $100,000 to Golovkin for not making weight, who earned a base purse of $900,000 not including any pay through his promoter. With this being Golovkin's 12th successive defense, it tied him with Marvelous Marvin Hagler and Felix Sturm for third-most in middleweight history. The number of defenses, however, is sometimes questioned as the WBA Regular belt, held by Golovkin previously, is regarded as a secondary title. ESPN reported the fight averaged 1.304 million viewers and peaked at 1.323 million.

==== Golovkin vs. Murray ====
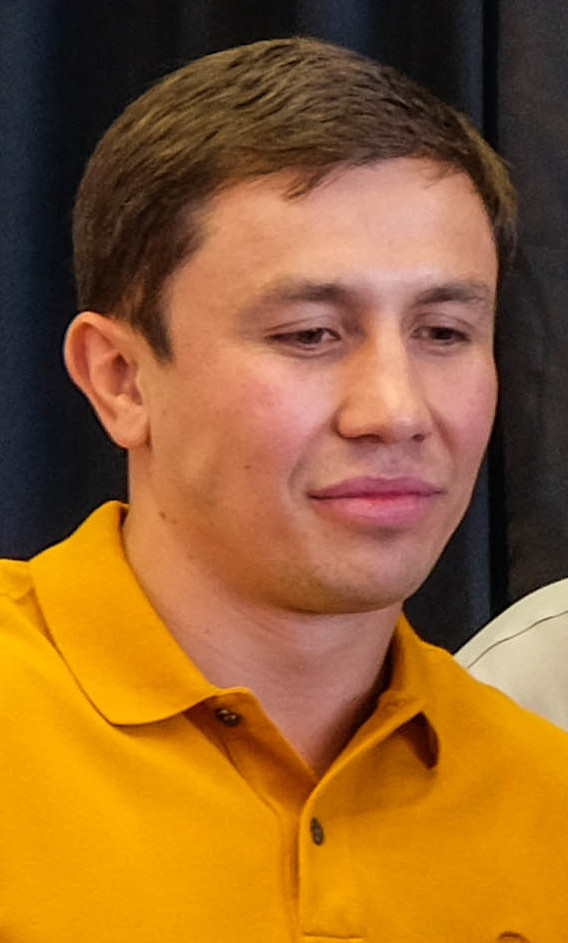
Golovkin in 2015

On 21 February 2015, Golovkin defended his middleweight titles against British boxer Martin Murray (28–1–1, 12 KOs) in Monte Carlo. The fight was officially announced in October 2014. Murray started the fight off well defensively, but by the fourth round Golovkin began to heat up and started finding Murray consistently. Murray was knocked down twice in the fourth round, even sustaining an additional punch to the head while down on a knee. Golovkin found it much easier to land his punches on Murray in the middle rounds. Although Murray's chin withstood a lot of Golovkin punches in those middle rounds, he eventually went down again in round 10 after sustaining a lot of punishment. Murray came out for round 11 and therefore had lasted longer in the ring with Golovkin than any other of his opponents so far, although Murray came out with a bloodied countenance and Golovkin continued to connect with shots, the referee stopped the bout as he felt Murray was not fighting back effectively and had taken too many punches. CompuBox statistics showed Golovkin landing 292 of 816 punches (36%), and Murray connected on 131 of 469 (28%). The fight aired on HBO in the USA during the afternoon and averaged 862,000 viewers. At the time of stoppage, the three judges had their respective scorecards reading 100–87, 99–88, and 99–88 in favor of Golovkin. The fight was televised live on HBO in the US in the afternoon and averaged 862,000 viewers, peaking at 938,000 viewers. Although it was a decline in viewership for Golovkin on HBO, it was expected as it was shown during the day and not peak time.

==== Golovkin vs. Monroe Jr. ====
Boxing Insider reported that a deal had been agreed for Golovkin to defend his titles against American Willie Monroe Jr. (19–1, 6 KOs) at The Forum, Inglewood, California on 16 May 2015. In front of 12,372, Golovkin defeated Monroe via sixth-round TKO, to extend his KO streak to 20. In the first minute of the first round, Monroe started fast with superior movement and jabs, but after that the pace slowed with GGG cutting off the ring and outworking him. In round six, GGG came forward and quickly caught an off guard Monroe with power shots along the ropes, and Monroe went down to his knees, just beating the ten count of referee Jack Reiss. Referee Reiss was willing to give Monroe another chance, but Monroe did not wish to continue, stating, "I'm done." Reiss immediately stopped the contest. Monroe was dropped a total of three times. At the time of the stoppage, the scorecards read 50–43, 50–43, and 49–44 for Golovkin. Golovkin landed 133 of 297 punches thrown (45%), Monroe landed 87 punches of 305 thrown (29%). In the post-fight, Golovkin said, "Willie is a good fighter, a tough fighter. I feel great. My performance was special for you guys. This was a very good drama show. This was for you." He then spoke about future fights, "I stay here. I am the real champion. I want unification. Let's go, let's do it guys. Who is No. 1 right now? Bring it on. I will show you." In regards to unification and big fights, the names of Miguel Cotto, Saúl Álvarez and Andre Ward were mentioned. Golovkin received a purse of $1.5 million and Monroe earned $100,000 for the fight. The fight drew an average viewership of 1.338 million and peaked at 1.474 million viewers.

==== Golovkin vs. Lemieux ====
It was announced in July 2015 that Golovkin would be defending his three world titles against IBF world champion David Lemieux (34–2, 31 KOs) in a unification fight at the Madison Square Garden in New York City on 17 October 2015, live on HBO pay-per-view. Both boxers took to Twitter to announce the news. Lemieux won the then vacant IBF title by outpointing Hassan N'Dam N'Jikam in June 2015.

Golovkin defeated Lemieux via eighth-round technical knockout to unify his WBA (Super), IBO, and WBC Interim middleweight titles with Lemieux's IBF title. Golovkin established the pace with his jab while landing his power shots in between, keeping Lemieux off-balance the entire night. Lemieux was dropped by a body shot in the fifth round and sustained an additional punch to the head after he had taken a knee. He was badly staggered in the eighth, so the referee was forced to halt the bout. Golovkin landed 280 of 549 punches thrown (51%) whilst Lemieux landed 89 of 335 (27%).

The fight generated 153,000 PPV buys on HBO and generated a further $2 million live gate from the sold out arena. The fight was replayed later in the week and averaged 797,000 viewers and peaked just over 1 million viewers.

==== Golovkin vs. Wade ====
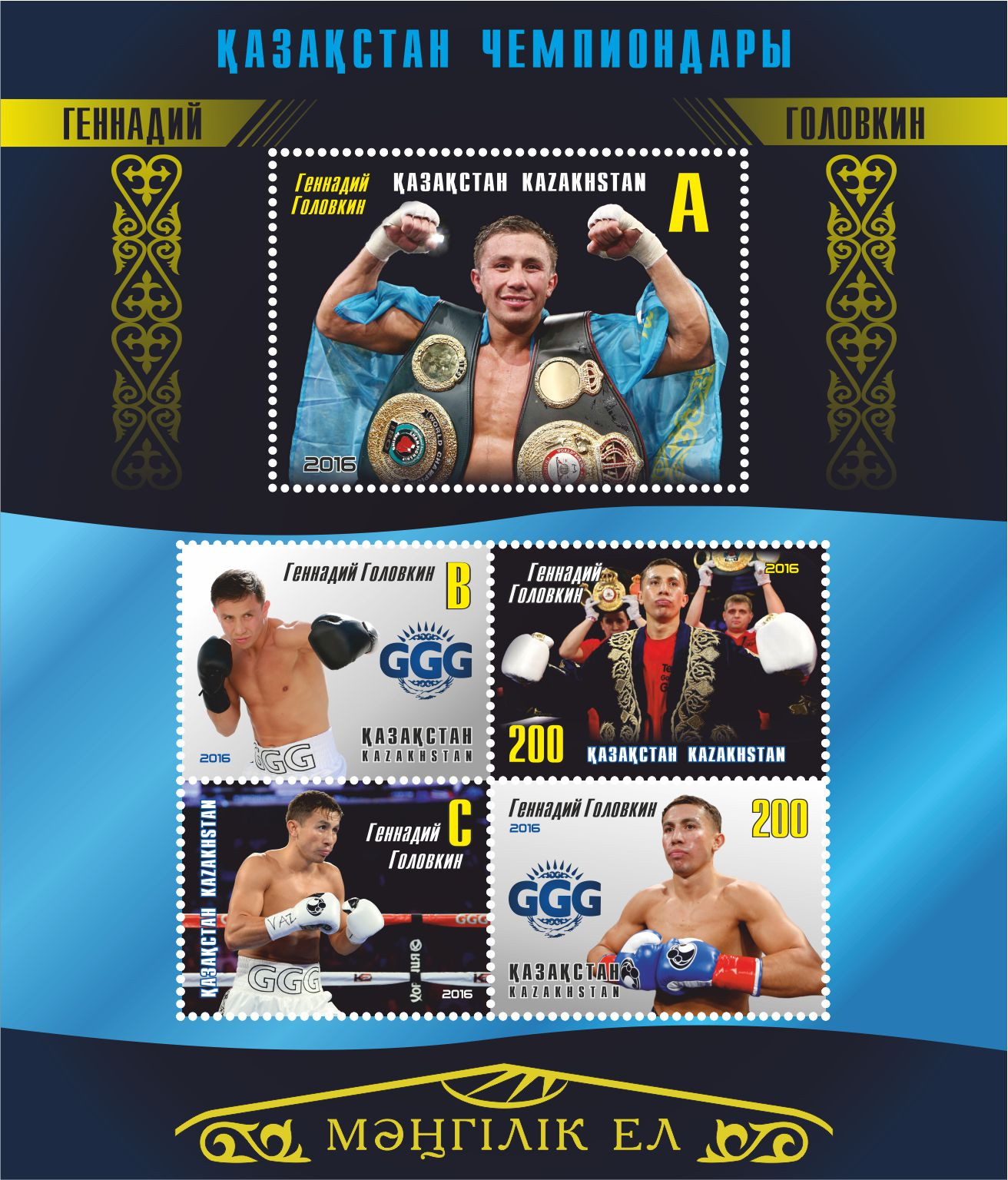
A 2016 stamp sheet dedicated to Golovkin issued by Kazakhstan

On 10 February 2016, it was announced that Golovkin would defend his IBF and WBA middleweight titles on HBO against IBF mandatory challenger Dominic Wade (18–0, 12 KOs) on 23 April at The Forum in Inglewood, California. This bout wasn't expected to be very competitive for Golovkin, who also stated that he wouldn't underestimate Wade and added, "I'm happy to fight again at the Forum in front of my fans and friends in Los Angeles, Dominic Wade is a very hungry and skilled middleweight who is undefeated and will be another big test for me." Wade was very thankful for getting the opportunity to fight Golovkin, "I am so grateful to be given the opportunity to fight 'GGG' for the IBF Middleweight Championship on April 23! I've worked hard my entire career to get to this point. I'm poised and ready to take on the challenge." The card was co-featured by Roman Gonzalez who successfully defended his WBC flyweight title with a unanimous points decision over McWilliams Arroyo. In front of a sellout crowd of 16,353, Golovkin successfully defended his middleweight titles with an early stoppage of Wade, his 22nd successive knockout. Wade was knocked down three times before the fight was stopped with 23 seconds remaining in round 2. According to CompuBox stats, Golovkin landed 54 of 133 punches (41%), with most being power punches. Wade managed to land 22 of his 75 thrown (29%). After the fight, when asked about Canelo Álvarez, Golovkin said, "I feel great. I'm here now, and I'm here to stay. I'm not going anywhere. Give me my belt, give me my belt! Let's fight," Golovkin reportedly earned a career high $2m for this fight compared to the $500,000 that Wade earned. The fight drew an average of 1,325,000 viewers and peaked at 3,888,000 on HBO.

==== Golovkin vs. Álvarez negotiations ====
Following Canelo Álvarez's victory against Miguel Cotto, talks began between the Golovkin and Álvarez camps over the future WBC title defense. In the end, an agreement was ultimately reached to allow interim bouts before the fight to, in the words of WBC president Mauricio Sulaiman, "maximize the interest in their highly anticipated showdown."

On 18 May 2016, Álvarez vacated the WBC middleweight title, which resulted in Golovkin being immediately awarded the title by the WBC who officially recognized him as their middleweight champion.

==== Golovkin vs. Brook ====
On 8 July 2016, it was announced that Golovkin would defend his world middleweight titles against undefeated British IBF welterweight champion Kell Brook (36–0, 25 KOs). The fight took place on 10 September 2016, at the O2 Arena in London, England. Brook was scheduled to fight in a unification bout against Jessie Vargas, whereas there was negotiations for Golovkin to fight Chris Eubank Jr.; however, negotiations fell through and Brook agreed to move up two weight divisions to challenge Golovkin. The fight aired in the United States on HBO and on Sky Box Office pay-per-view in the United Kingdom.

On 5 September, the WBA withdrew its sanction for the fight. Although they granted Golovkin a special permit to take the fight, they stated that their title would not be at stake. The reason for the withdrawal was because Brook had never competed in the middleweight division. WBA president Gilberto Mendoza Jr. said, "What I most regret is that there are no boxers at 160 pounds who will fight against 'Triple G,' and Brook has to move up two divisions to fight against him." The Golovkin camp were said to be disappointed with the decision with promoter Tom Loeffler saying, "somehow the WBA thought it was too dangerous for a welterweight to move up to middleweight to fight the biggest puncher in boxing. I guess that is a compliment to GGG as they sanctioned [Adrien] Broner moving up two divisions [from lightweight to welterweight] to fight Paulie [Malignaggi in 2013] and Roy Jones moving up two divisions [from light heavyweight to heavyweight] to fight John Ruiz [in 2003] for WBA titles, and Kell Brook is undefeated and considered a top pound-for-pound boxer."

"If this what the guy look like when he's sick, God knows what he look like when he's well."

— Bernard Hopkins on Golovkin's reported illness going into the Brook fight.

Golovkin came out aggressively, going as far as to buckle Brook's legs in the first round. He was met with stiff resistance as Brook began to fire back, connecting multiple clean combinations on Golovkin, none of which were able to faze him. In the second round Brook had his greatest success of the fight, but in the process had his right eye socket broken. Over the next three rounds, Golovkin began to break Brook down. The Englishman showed courage, determination and a great chin as he absorbed the bulk of a Golovkin onslaught. Despite the fight being even on two judges' scorecards, and one judge having Brook ahead by a point, the latter's corner threw in the towel to protect their fighter's damaged right eye, ending the fight in round 5 with both boxers still standing. Speaking after the fight, Golovkin said, "I promised to bring 'Big Drama Show,' like street fight. I don't feel his power. I feel his distance. He has great distance. He feels [my power], and after second round I understand that it's not boxing. I need street fight. Just broke him. That's it." Brook said, "I'm devastated. I expected him to be a bigger puncher. I think in the second round, he broke my eye socket. He caught me with a shot, and I was starting to settle into the fight, but I was seeing three or four of him, so it was hard to get through it. I was tricking him. His shots were coming underneath, and I was frustrating him. I was starting to settle into him, but when you see three or four of them, it is hard to carry on." Golovkin stated although Brook fought like a true champion, he was not a middleweight.

According to Compubox stats, Golovkin landed 133 of his 301 punches thrown (44.2%), whilst Brook landed 85 punches, having thrown 261 (32.6%). The fight was aired live on HBO in the afternoon and drew an average of 843,000 viewers and peaked at 907,000 viewers. This was considered by HBO to be a huge success for an afternoon showing. A replay was shown later in the evening as part of the world super flyweight title fight between Roman Gonzalez and Carlos Cuadras. The replay averaged 593,000 viewers. Golovkin earned a guaranteed $5 million purse. Brook was guaranteed slightly less, around £3 million, but earned an upside of PPV revenue.

==== Golovkin vs. Jacobs ====
Following the win over Brook, there were immediate talks of a WBA unification fight against 'Regular' champion Daniel Jacobs (32–1, 29 KOs), as part of WBA's plan to reduce the amount of world titles in each division from three to one. Team Golovkin spoke of fighting Billy Joe Saunders after the Jacobs fight which would be a middleweight unification fight for all the belts.

The date discussed initially was 10 December, which Golovkin's team had on hold for Madison Square Garden. The date was originally set by HBO for Álvarez after he defeated Liam Smith, but Canelo confirmed he would not be fighting again until 2017 after fracturing his right thumb. There was ongoing negotiations between Tom Loeffler and Al Haymon about the split in purses, if the fight goes to purse bids, it would be a 75–25 split with Golovkin taking the majority due to him being the 'Super' champion. As the negotiations continued, Jacobs wanted a better split, around 60–40. The WBA granted an extension for the negotiation period on 7 October, as the two sides originally had until 10 October to come to an arrangement or else a purse bid would be due. There was also a request to change the purse bid split to 60–40, which the WBA declined. Golovkin started his training camp for the fight on 17 October.

Loeffler told the LA Times on 18 October, although the negotiations remain active, the fight will not take place on 10 December. A new date for early 2017 would need to be set, still looking at Madison Square Garden to host the fight. Golovkin prides himself on being an extremely active fighter, and this is the first year since 2012 that he has been in fewer than three fights. WBA president Gilberto Mendoza confirmed in an email to RingTV that a deal had to be made by 5pm on 7 December or a purse bid would be held on 19 December in Panama. Later that day, the WBA announced a purse bid would be scheduled with a minimum bid of $400,000, with Golovkin receiving 75% and Jacobs 25%. Although purse bids were announced, Loeffler stated he would carry on negotiations, hopeful that a deal would be reached before the purse bid.

On 17 December, terms were finally agreed and it was officially announced that the fight would take place at Madison Square Garden in New York City on 18 March 2017, exclusively on HBO PPV. Golovkin tweeted the announcement whilst Jacobs uploaded a quick video on social media. At the time of the fight, both fighters had a combined 35 consecutive knockouts. It was reported that Golovkin's IBO world title would not be at stake. The IBO website later confirmed the belt would be at stake. HBO officially announced the fight on 22 December, being billed as "Middleweight Madness". Loeffler confirmed there was no rematch clause in place.

At the official weigh-in, a day before the fight, Golovkin tipped the scales at 159.6 lb, while Jacobs weighed 159.8 lb. Jacobs declined to compete for the IBF title by skipping a fight-day weight check. Unlike other major sanctioning bodies, the IBF requires participants in title fights to submit to a weight check on the morning of the fight, as well as the official weigh-in the day before the fight; at the morning weight check, they can weigh no more than 10 pounds (4.5 kg) above the fight's weight limit. Jacobs weighed 182 lb on fight night, 12 more than Golovkin.

In front of a sell out crowd of 19,939, the fight went the full 12 rounds. This was the first time that Golovkin fought 12 rounds in his professional career. Golovkin's ring control, constant forward pressure and effective jab lead to a 115–112, 115–112, and 114–113 unanimous decision victory, ending his 23 fight knockout streak which dated back to November 2008. ESPN had Golovkin winning 115–112. The opening three rounds were quiet with very little action. In the fourth round, Golovkin dropped Jacobs with a short right hand along the ropes for a flash knockdown. Jacobs recovered, but Golovkin controlled most of the middle rounds. Jacobs was effective in switching between orthodox and southpaw stance, but remained on the back foot. Both boxers were warned once in the fight by referee Charlie Fitch for rabbit punching. According to Compubox punch stats, Golovkin landed 231 of 615 punches (38%) which was more than Jacobs who landed 175 of 541 (32%). Following the fight, some doubted Golovkin did enough to win. Jacobs thought he had won the fight by two rounds and attributed the loss due to the potential big money fight that is Golovkin vs. Canelo. Jacobs also stated after being knocked down, he told Golovkin, "he'd have to kill me." In the post-fight interview, Golovkin said, "I'm a boxer, not a killer. I respect the game." Before revenue shares, it was reported that Golovkin would earn at least $2.5 million compared to Jacobs $1.75 million.

On 24 March, Tom Loeffler revealed the fight generated 170,000 pay-per-view buys. A replay was shown on HBO later in the week and averaged 709,000 viewers. Lance Pugmire from LA Times reported the live gate was $3.7 million, a big increase from the Golovkin vs. Lemieux PPV which did $2 million. He also said that merchandise and sponsors were higher.

==== Golovkin vs. Álvarez ====
After retaining his belts against Jacobs, Golovkin stated that he wanted to unify the middleweight division and hold all the belts available. The only major belt not belonging to him was the WBO title held by British boxer Billy Joe Saunders. After defeating Jacobs, Golovkin said, "My goal is all the belts in the middleweight division. Of course, Billy Joe is the last one. It is my dream." There was rumours of the fight taking place in Golovkin's home country Kazakhstan in June during the EXPO 2017. The last time Golovkin fought in his home country was in 2010. On 20 March, Golovkin said that he would fight Saunders in his native Kazakhstan or the O2 Arena in London.

Saunders tweeted on social media that although he didn't watch Golovkin's fight with Jacobs, he was ready to fight him. Saunders claimed to have signed the contract on his end and gave Golovkin a deadline to sign his. On 29 March, promoter Frank Warren also stated that Golovkin would have ten days to sign for the fight. Saunders later claimed to have moved on from Golovkin, until Warren said the deal was still in place. Over the next week, Saunders continued to insult Golovkin through social media. On 7 April, Warren told iFL TV, that Golovkin had a hand injury, which was the reason why the fight hadn't been made. In the interview, he said, "At the moment, they're saying that Golovkin's injured. So we're waiting to see where this is all going. But as far as I'm concerned, we agreed [to] terms." It was also noted that he would wait until 6 May, for any updates. On 11 April, it was reported that the fight would not take place and Golovkin would ultimately focus on a September 2017 fight against Canelo Álvarez.

Immediately after the Chavez fight on May 6, Canelo Álvarez announced that he would next fight Golovkin on the weekend of 16 September 2017, at a location to be determined. Golovkin, who before the fight stated he would not attend, was joined by his trainer Abel Sanchez and promoter Tom Loeffler. Golovkin joined him in the ring during the announcement to help promote their upcoming bout. Speaking through a translator, Álvarez said, "Golovkin, you are next, my friend. The fight is done. I've never feared anyone, since I was 15 fighting as a professional. When I was born, fear was gone." When Golovkin arrived in the ring, he said, "I feel very excited. Right now is a different story. In September, it will be a different style -- a big drama show. I'm ready. Tonight, first congrats to Canelo and his team. Right now, I think everyone is excited for September. Canelo looked very good tonight, and 100 percent he is the biggest challenge of my career. Good luck to Canelo in September." In the post-fight press conference, both boxers came face to face and spoke about the upcoming fight.

On 9 May, Eric Gomez, president of Golden Boy Promotions told the LA Times that Álvarez had an immediate rematch clause in place on his contract, whereas Golovkin, if he loses, won't be guaranteed a rematch. Oscar De La Hoya later also revealed in an interview with ESPN the fight would take place at the full middleweight limit of 160 pounds with no re-hydration clauses, meaning Golovkin and Álvarez would be able to gain unlimited amount of weight following the weigh in. On 5 June, the T-Mobile Arena in Las Vegas was announced as the venue of the fight, and would mark the first time Golovkin would fight in Nevada. The AT&T Stadium, Madison Square Garden and Dodger Stadium missed out on hosting the fight. Eric Gomez of Golden Boy Promotions said in a statement that Álvarez would fight for the IBF meaning he would participate in the second day weigh in, which the IBF require that each boxer weighs no more than 10 pounds over the 160 pound limit. Although he said there was no word on whether Álvarez would fight for the WBC title, Álvarez claimed that he would not be. On 7 July 2017, Golden Boy and K2 Promotions individually announced the tickets had sold out.

On 15 August, Golden Boy matchmaker Robert Diaz revealed that Álvarez would indeed attend the IBF mandatory second day weigh in and fully intended to fight for the IBF title along with the WBA title. He did make it clear that whilst Golovkin would still defend the WBC and IBO title, Álvarez would not pay their sanctioning fees. On 22 August, IBF president Daryl Peoples announced that they would be dropping the mandatory second day weigh in for unification fights, meaning neither fighters are required to participate, however they would still encourage them to do so. It was reported that Álvarez would earn a base minimum $5 million and Golovkin would earn $3 million, before any shares of the revenue are added to their purses.

On fight night, in front of a sold out crowd of 22,358, Golovkin and Álvarez fought to a split draw (118–110 Álvarez, 115–113 Golovkin, and 114–114). ESPN's Dan Rafael and HBO's Harold Lederman scored the fight 116–112 in favor of Golovkin. Judge Adalaide Byrd's scorecard of 118–110 in favor of Álvarez was widely ridiculed. Many observers felt that Golovkin had won a closely contested fight, and while a draw was justifiable, a card that wide in favor of Álvarez was inexcusable. Nevertheless, Bob Bennett, director of the Nevada Athletic Commission, said that he had full confidence in Byrd going forward. Despite the controversy, several mainstream media outlets referred to the bout as a "classic". The fight started with both boxers finding their rhythm, Álvarez using his footwork and Golovkin establishing his jab. During the middle rounds, particularly between 4 and 8, Álvarez started each round quick, but seemed to tire out after a minute, with Golovkin taking over and doing enough to win the rounds. The championship rounds were arguably the best rounds and Álvarez started to counter more and both fighters stood toe-to-toe exchanging swings, the majority of which missed. The draw saw Golovkin make his 9th consecutive defence. CompuBox stats showed that Golovkin was the busier of the two, landing 218 of 703 thrown (31%), while Álvarez was more accurate, landing 169 of his 505 thrown (33%). Golovkin out punched Álvarez in 10 of the 12 rounds. The replay, which took place a week later on HBO averaged 726,000, peaking at 840,000 viewers.

Speaking to Max Kellerman after the fight, Golovkin said, "It was a big drama show. [The scoring] is not my fault. I put pressure on him every round. Look, I still have all the belts. I am still the champion." Álvarez felt as though he won the fight, "In the first rounds, I came out to see what he had. Then I was building from there. I think I won eight rounds. I felt that I won the fight. I think I was superior in the ring. I won at least seven or eight rounds. I was able to counterpunch and made Gennady wobble at least three times. If we fight again, it's up to the people. I feel frustrated over my draw." Golovkin's trainer Abel Sanchez believed judge Byrd had her scorecard filled out before the first bell rang. Álvarez ruled out another fight in 2017, claiming he would return on Cinco de Mayo weekend in May 2018. At the post-fight press conference, Álvarez said through a translator, "Look, right now I wanna rest. Whatever the fans want, whatever the people want and ask for, we'll do. You know that's my style. But right now, who knows if it's in May or September? But one thing's for sure – this is my era, the era of Canelo." Golovkin's promoter Tom Loeffler stated that they would like an immediate rematch, but Golovkin, who prefers fighting at least three times in a calendar year, reiterated his desire to also fight in December. WBO middleweight champion Saunders said he was ready for Golovkin and looking to fight in December too.

The fight surpassed Mayweather-Álvarez to achieve the third highest gate in boxing history. ESPN reported the fight generated $27,059,850 from 17,318 tickets sold. 934 complimentary tickets were given out, according to the NSAC. Mayweather vs. Álvarez sold 16,146 tickets to produce a live gate of $20,003,150. The replay, which took place a week later on HBO averaged 726,000, peaking at 840,000 viewers. The LA Times reported the fight generated 1.3 million domestic PPV buys. Although HBO didn't make an official announcement, it is believed that the revenue would exceed $100 million.

==== Cancelled Álvarez rematch ====
Immediately after the controversial ending, talks began for a rematch between Álvarez and Golovkin. Álvarez stated he would next fight in May 2018, whereas Golovkin was open to fighting in December 2017. ESPN reported that Álvarez, who only had the rematch clause in his contract, must activate it within three weeks of their fight. On 19 September, Golden Boy Promotions president Eric Gomez told ESPN that everyone on their side was interested in the rematch and they would hold discussions with Tom Loeffler in the next coming days. Ringtv reported that the negotiations would begin on 22 September. On 24 September, Gomez said the rematch would likely take place in the first week of May 2018, or if a deal could be worked, we could see the fight take place as early as March. Despite ongoing negotiations for the rematch, at the 55th annual convention in Baku, Azerbaijan on 2 October, the WBC officially ordered a rematch. Golden Boy president Eric Gomez told ESPN, "Regardless of if they did or didn't order the rematch, we are going to try to make it happen. We'll do whatever it takes to make it happen." On 7 November, Eric Gomez indicated the negotiations were going well and Álvarez would make a decision in regards to the rematch in the coming weeks. It was believed that Golden Boy would wait until after David Lemieux and Billy Joe Saunders fought for the latter's WBO title on 16 December 2017, before making a decision. On 15 November, Eddie Hearn, promoter of Daniel Jacobs stated that he approached Tom Loeffler regarding a possible rematch between Golovkin and Jacobs if the Álvarez-Golovkin rematch failed to take place. On 20 December, Eric Gomez announced that the negotiations were close to being finalized after Álvarez gave Golden Boy the go-ahead to write up the contracts. On 29 January 2018, HBO finally announced the rematch would take place on 5 May on the Cinco de Mayo weekend. On 22 February, the T-Mobile Arena was again selected as the fight's venue. According to WBC, unlike the first bout, Álvarez would fight for their title.

On 5 March 2018, Álvarez tested positive for the banned substance clenbuterol ahead of the fight. Adding to the controversy, Golovkin's trainer Abel Sanchez claimed that Álvarez had his hands wrapped in an illegal manner for the first fight. On 23 March, the Nevada State Athletic Commission temporarily suspended Álvarez due to his two positive tests for the banned substance clenbuterol. Álvarez was required to appear at a commission hearing, either in person or via telephone, on the issue on 10 April. The commission would decide at the hearing whether the fight would be permitted to go ahead as scheduled. Tom Loeffler stated that Golovkin intended to fight on 5 May, regardless of his opponent being Álvarez or anyone else. On 26 March, former two-time light middleweight champion Demetrius Andrade (25-0, 16 KOs), who started campaigning at middleweight in 2017, put himself into the equation and offered to fight Golovkin on 5 May. On 29 March, IBF mandatory challenger Sergiy Derevyanchenko's manager Keith Connolly told Boxing Scene that Derevyanchenko would be ready to replace Álvarez and fight Golovkin in his place if the fight was to get postponed on 10 April. On 28 March, MGM Resorts International, who owns the T-Mobile Arena, started to offer full refunds to anyone who had already purchased tickets for the bout. They wrote, "In the event a fan requested a refund, they could get one at the original point of sale and in full." The Las Vegas Review-Journal reported the news. Álvarez's hearing was rescheduled for 18 April, as Bob Bennett filed a complaint against Álvarez. On 3 April, Álvarez officially withdrew from the rematch. Golden Boy mentioned during a press conference it was hinted that Álvarez would likely not be cleared at the hearing and they would not have enough time to promote the fight. At the hearing, Álvarez was given a six-month suspension, backdated to his first drug test fail on 17 February, meaning the ban would end on 17 August 2018. His promoter De La Hoya then announced that Álvarez would return to the ring on the Mexican Independence Day weekend.

==== Golovkin vs. Martirosyan ====
On 2 April, before Álvarez withdrew from the rematch, Loeffler stated that Golovkin would fight on 5 May, regardless of whether it would be Álvarez or another boxer and the fight would take place at the MGM Grand Garden Arena in Paradise. On fighting, Golovkin said, "I am looking forward to returning to Las Vegas for my 20th title defense and headlining my first Cinco De Mayo event on 5 May. It is time for less drama and more fighting," On 5 April, ESPN reported that Mexican boxer, Jaime Munguia (28–0, 24 KOs), a 21 year old untested prospect who previously fought at welterweight and light middleweight was going to step in and fight Golovkin. Later that day, Lance Pugmire of LA Times stated sources close to NSAC, although Tom Loeffler hadn't submitted any names forward, if Munguia's name was mentioned, it would not be approved. Derevyanchenko's promoter, Lou DiBella petitioned to the IBF to force a mandatory. With less than a month before the scheduled fight date, the NSAC cancelled the fight, meaning it would not take place at the MGM Grand. Prior to the NSAC cancelling the bout, Lance Pugmire of LA Times reported that Golovkin would still fight on 5 May, however it would take place at the StubHub Center in Carson, California on regular HBO. Former light middleweight world title challenger and California local Vanes Martirosyan (36–3–1, 21 KOs) became a front runner to challenge Golovkin. The IBF stated they would not sanction their belt if the fight was made and Golovkin could potentially be stripped of his title. Martirosyan was criticised as an opponent as he had been a career light middleweight, he was coming off a loss and he had not fought in two years. The WBC approved Martirosyan as a late replace opponent. On 18 April, Martirosyan was confirmed as Golovkin's opponent, with the event being billed as 'Mexican Style 2' on 5 May, at the StubHub Center. A day later the IBF stated that neither Golovkin or Loeffler made any request for exception, however if and when they did, the IBF would consider the request. On 27 April, the IBF agreed to sanction the bout as long as Golovkin would make a mandatory defence against Derevyanchenko by 3 August 2018.

On fight night, in front of 7,837 fans, Golovkin knocked Martirosyan out in round 2. Golovkin applied pressure immediately backing Martirosyan against the ropes and landing his jab. Martirosyan had short success at the end of round 1 when he landed a combination of punches. Again at the start of round 2, Golovkin started quick. He landed a right uppercut followed by a body shot. He then connected with nine power shots which were unanswered and eventually Martirosyan fell face first to the canvas. Referee Jack Reiss made a full 10-count. The time of stoppage was 1 minute 53 seconds. Speaking of Golovkin's power in the post-fight, Martirosyan said it felt like he was 'being hit by a train.' Golovkin said, "It feels great to get a knockout. Vanes is a very good fighter. He caught me a few times in the first round. In the second round, I came out all business after I felt him out in the first round." For the fight, Golovkin landed 36 of 84 punches thrown (43%) and Martirosyan landed 18 of his 73 thrown (25%). Golovkin's purse for the fight was $1 million and Martirosyan earned a smaller amount of $225,000. The fight averaged 1,249,000 viewers and peaked at 1,361,000 viewers, making most-watched boxing match on cable television in 2018.

==== Golovkin vs. Álvarez II ====
According to Golovkin on 27 April, before he defeated Martirosyan, a fight with Álvarez in the fall was still a priority. During a conference call, he stated it was the 'biggest fight in the world' and beneficial for all parties involved. Although Golovkin stated the rematch had a 10% chance of happening, Eric Gomez and Tom Loeffler agreed to meet and start negotiating after 5 May. One of the main issues preventing the rematch to take place was the purse split. Álvarez wanted 65–35 in his favor, the same terms Golovkin agreed to initially, however Golovkin wanted a straight 50–50 split.

On 6 June, Golovkin was stripped of his IBF world title due to not adhering to the IBF rules. The IBF granted Golovkin an exception to fight Martirosyan although they would not sanction the fight, however told Golovkin's team to start negotiating and fight mandatory challenger Sergiy Derevyanchenko by 3 August 2018. The IBF released a statement in detail. On 7 June, Golovkin's team stated they would accept a 55–45 split in favor of Álvarez. The split in the initial rematch negotiations, Golovkin accepted a 65–35 split in favor of Álvarez. On 12 June, Golden Boy gave Golovkin a 24-hour deadline to accept a 57½-42½ split in Álvarez's favor or they would explore other fights. At this time, Golden Boy were already in light negotiations with Eddie Hearn for a fight against Daniel Jacobs instead. At the same time, Loeffler was working closely with Frank Warren to match Saunders with Golovkin for the end of August. Golovkin declined the offer and De La Hoya stated there would be no rematch. Despite this, some sources indicated both sides were still negotiating after a "Hail Mary" idea came to light. Hours later, De La Hoya confirmed via his Twitter account that terms had been agreed and the fight would indeed take place on 15 September, at the T-Mobile Arena in Paradise, Nevada. Golovkin revealed to ESPN he agreed to 45%. Álvarez started training for the bout on 14 June, and stated his intention to apply for his boxing license on 18 August. It was confirmed that both boxers would not physically come face to face with each other until the fight week. A split-screen press conference took place on 3 July. On 3 September, due to a majority vote of the panel, it was announced The Ring Magazine's vacant middleweight title would be contested for the bout. Doug Fischer wrote, "We posed the question to the Ratings Panel, which, in a landslide, voted in favor the magazine's 160-pound championship being up for grabs when the two stars clash at T-Mobile Arena in Las Vegas." The IBO's middleweight title was only at stake for Golovkin as Canelo refused to pay the sanctioning fee.

In front of a sell out crowd of 21,965, the fight was again not without controversy as Álvarez defeated Golovkin via majority decision after 12 rounds. Álvarez was favored by judges Dave Moretti and Steve Weisfeld, both scoring the bout 115–113, the third judge Glenn Feldman scored it 114–114. The result was disputed by fans, pundits and media. Of the 18 media outlets scoring the bout, 10 ruled in favor of Golovkin, 7 scored a draw, while 1 scored the bout for Álvarez. The scorecards showed how close the bout was, with the judges splitting eight rounds. After 9 rounds, all three judges had their scores reading 87–84 for Álvarez

The fight was much different to the first bout in terms of action. Álvarez, who was described by Golovkin's team as a 'runner', altered his style and became more aggressive. Both boxers found use of their respective jabs from the opening round with Golovkin using his jab more as the fight went on. Big punches were landed by both fighters during the bout, with both Álvarez and Golovkin showing excellent chins. Despite the tense build up, both boxers showed each other respect after the fight. Álvarez made good use of his body attack, landing 46 compared to Golovkin's 6 landed. Compubox Stats showed that Golovkin landed 234 of 879 punches thrown (27%) and Álvarez landed 202 of his 622 punches (33%). In the 12 rounds, not once did Golovkin's back touch the ropes. Alvarez backed to the ropes twice late in the fight. In eight of the 12 rounds, Golovkin outlanded Álvarez. Harold Lederman scored this second fight, as he did the first, 116–112 in favor of Golovkin.

In the post-fight interviews, through a translator, Álvarez said, "I showed my victory with facts. He was the one who was backing up. I feel satisfied because I gave a great fight. It was a clear victory." He continued, "That was a great fight. But in the end, it was a victory for Mexico. And again, it was an opportunity. And I want to shout out to my opponent, the best in the sport of boxing. I am a great fighter, and I showed it tonight. If the people want another round, I'll do it again. But for right now, I will enjoy time with my family." Golovkin did not take part in the post fight and made his way backstage, where he received stitches for a cut over his right eye. He later responded to the defeat, "I'm not going to say who won tonight, because the victory belongs to Canelo, according to the judges. I thought it was a very good fight for the fans and very exciting. I thought I fought better than he did." Golovkin's trainer Abel Sanchez, who was very critical of Álvarez following the first fight, said, "We had a great fight, the one we expected the first time around. I had it close going into the 12th round. We had good judges, who saw it from different angles. I can't complain about the decision, but it's close enough to warrant a third fight. Canelo fought a great fight. Congratulations." Both fighters were open to a trilogy.

The fight generated a live gate of $23,473,500 from 16,732 tickets sold. This was lower than the first bout, however the fourth largest-grossing gates in Nevada boxing history. The fight sold 1.1 million PPV buys, lower than the first bout, however due to being priced at $84.95, it generated more revenue at around $94 million.

=== Career from 2019–2023 ===
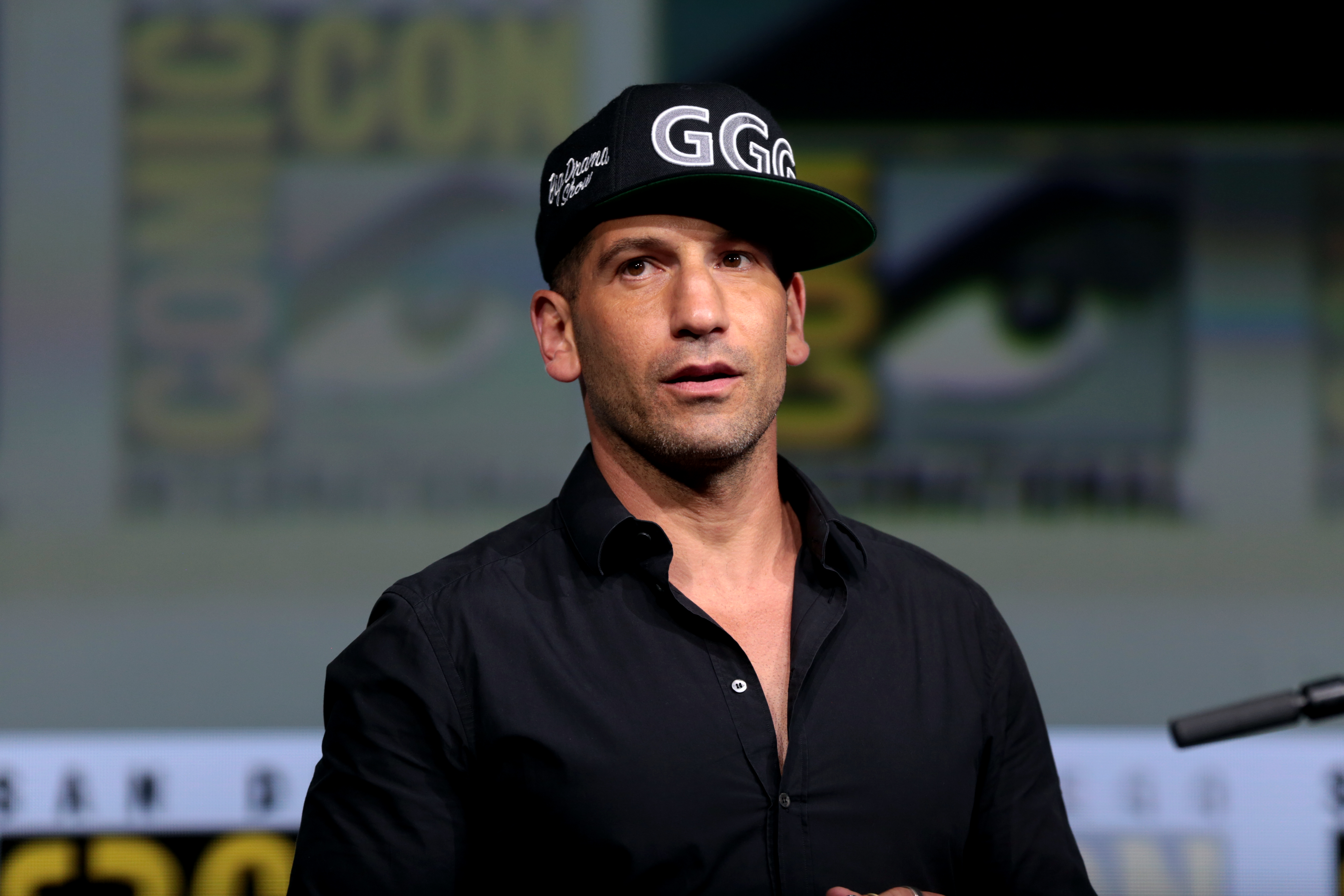
Golovkin's abbreviated nickname, and his catchphrase "Big Drama Show" became trademarks. Jon Bernthal is shown here wearing a recognizable GGG flat brim

In January 2019, Oscar De La Hoya instructed Golden Boy president Eric Gomez to start negotiating a deal for a third fight between Golovkin and Álvarez. Golden Boy had already booked in 4 May, Cinco De Mayo weekend at the T-Mobile Arena. A few days later, Gomez posted on social media, after preliminary talks with Golovkin's team, he felt as though Golovkin did not want a third fight. On 17 January, it was announced that Álvarez would take part in a middleweight unification bout against Daniel Jacobs on 4 May 2019.

On 1 February, theblast.com reported that Golovkin had filed a lawsuit against his former managers Maximilian and Oleg Hermann, seeking $3.5 million in damages. In the suit it claimed the Hermann brothers had taken advantage of Golovkin financially, taking higher percentages and 'intentionally failing to account for revenue' from previous fights. At the same time, it was reported that Golovkin was negotiating a broadcast deal with DAZN, Showtime/FOX and ESPN.

On 27 February, Tom Loeffler stated Golovkin was close to securing a deal, with some reports suggesting he was going to sign with DAZN. On 8 March, DAZN announced they had signed Golovkin on a 3-year, 6-fight agreement, worth around $100 million, which would see Golovkin fight twice a year on the platform. It was revealed part of the agreement was Golovkin would earn a purse of $30 million for a trilogy fight against Álvarez. Apart from Golovkin's own fights, the agreement also included for 2-fight cards per year in 2020 and 2021 for GGG Promotions, to showcase talent from Golovkin's own promotional company. It was rumoured that Golovkin was offered equity in DAZN through his fight purses. Golovkin's first bout under the new contract was scheduled for June 2019. Golovkin praised DAZN's global vision and highlighted that as one of the key reasons he signed with them.

==== Golovkin vs. Rolls ====
On 21 March 2019, Golovkin advised that he wanted to fight the best of the middleweight division, regardless of belts. He wanted to close out the remainder of his career, not chasing titles, but to only fight the best and be the best middleweight. On 16 April, Golovkin announced he would fight 35 year old Canadian boxer Steve Rolls (19–0, 10 KOs) on 8 June 2019, at Madison Square Garden in New York at a catchweight of 164 pounds. Other names in the running to fight Golovkin were Brandon Adams (21–2, 13 KOs), Kamil Szeremeta (19–0, 4 KO) and former world champion Hassan N'Dam. It was then reported that Adams would challenge Jermall Charlo (28–0, 21 KOs) instead. Speaking to Fight Hub TV, Loeffler explained Rolls was chosen as Golovkin's opponent to increase subscriptions in Canada. On 24 April, Golovkin released a statement announcing he had split with longtime trainer Abel Sanchez, after nine long years. Sanchez called Golovkin 'Greedy and ungrateful', also advising ESPN, Golovkin had offered him a pay cut, which he refused. In May, during a press conference, Golovkin revealed Johnathon Banks as his new trainer. Banks was best known for having trained former world heavyweight champion Wladimir Klitschko. Golovkin weighed 163 pounds, and Rolls came in at 163¾ pounds. Golovkin's official purse was listed as $2 million, however it was reported he would earn closer to $15 million. Rolls was paid $300,000.

There was an announced crowd of 12,357 in attendance. Golovkin won the bout via knockout in round 4. From round 1, Golovkin began closing the gap on Rolls and looked to hurt Rolls with body shots. Round 2 was fought in similar fashion by Golovkin, who managed to land many clean shots. Rolls also had success in round 2, landing a number of clean shots, notably a left hand to the head, which pushed Golovkin back. By round 4, Rolls was feeling Golovkin's power. Golovkin backed Rolls up against the ropes and began throwing with both hands. Golovkin landed a shot to the temple on Rolls, the same shot he knocked out Marco Antonio Rubio, causing Rolls to cover up. With Golovkin's continued attack against the ropes, he landed a left hook to Rolls' chin, dropping Rolls face first on to the canvas. Rolls tried to beat the count, but ultimately fell towards the ropes. Referee Steve Willis stopped the bout at 2 minutes and 9 seconds into round 4, declaring Golovkin the winner. After 3 rounds, Golovkin was ahead 29–28, 30–27, and 30–27 on all three judges' scorecards.

During the post-fight in-ring interviews, Golovkin said, "I feel great. I feel like a new baby. Right now, I feel completely different because I came back to my knockout. I love knockouts, and I love New York. It was a great night all around [...] The fans know who they want me to fight next, I'm ready for September. I'm ready for Canelo. Just bring him, just ask him. I'm ready. If you want big drama show, please tell him." New trainer Banks was pleased with the knockout. CompuBox statistics showed that Golovkin landed 62 of 223 punches thrown (28%) and Rolls landed 38 of his 175 thrown (22%).

==== Golovkin vs. Derevyanchenko ====
On 5 October 2019, Golovkin defeated Ukrainian Sergiy Derevyanchenko by unanimous decision for the vacant IBF and IBO middleweight titles at Madison Square Garden, New York.

After a tentative start to the opening round, which saw both fighters sizing each other up with probing jabs, Golovkin fired off a six punch combination ending with a right hook to Derevyanchenko's head, dropping the Ukrainian with 1 minute left in the first round. Derevyanchenko rose to his feet within seconds, showing no signs of being hurt. The knockdown appeared to spur Derevyanchenko into action as he began to answer Golovkin's punches with his own shots for the remainder of the round. In round two, Derevyanchenko began putting three and four punch combinations together behind a single and double jab, while Golovkin stuck to single punches, landing the occasional eye-catching hook. Towards the end of the round, Golovkin opened a cut above Derevyanchenko's right eye. The action replay appeared to show the cut was caused by a left hook, however, the New York State Athletic Commission deemed it to be the result of an accidental clash of heads, meaning if the fight was stopped due to the cut before the fourth round then the fight would be ruled a no contest, after the fourth, the result would be determined by the scorecards with a technical decision rather than a technical knockout win for Golovkin if the cut was deemed to be the result of a punch. After Golovkin started the opening seconds of the third round as the aggressor, Derevyanchenko quickly fired back to the body, appearing to hurt Golovkin as he backed up and kept his elbows tucked in close to his body to protect his mid-section. Derevyanchenko took advantage of Golovkin's defensive posture, landing several clean punches to the former champion's head. Towards the end of the round Golovkin had some success with a couple of sharp hooks to the head and a right uppercut. Golovkin was the aggressor for the majority of the fourth round, having partial success, with Derevyanchenko picking his moments to fire back with two and three punch combinations and continuing to work the body. In the last minute of the round, Derevyanchenko appeared to momentarily trouble Golovkin with a straight-left hand to the body. At the beginning of the fifth round, the ringside doctor gave the cut above Derevyanchenko's right-eye a close examination before the action resumed. Derevyanchenko controlled the pace of the round with a high punch-output, continuing with three and four punch combinations with lateral movement. Golovkin, meanwhile, stuck with single hooks and probing jabs, landing a solid uppercut halfway through the round. In the final 20 seconds, Derevyanchenko landed another body shot which again appeared to hurt Golovkin, who reeled backwards with his elbows down at his side, protecting his body. The sixth was an evenly fought round with both fighters landing several clean punches to the head, although Golovkin appeared to land the more significant blows which caught the attention of the crowd. Rounds seven, eight and nine were much of the same, back and forth engagements with Golovkin seeming to land the more eye catching blows. The tenth saw Derevyanchenko apply the pressure and back Golovkin up for the first half of the round. Golovkin had success in the last minute with left and right hooks landing on Derevyanchenko's head, only to see the Ukrainian answer with his own solid shots and back Golovkin up once again in the final 30 seconds of the round. The eleventh and twelfth were closely contested, both fighters having success, with Golovkin again appearing to land the more catching punches in the twelfth and final round. After twelve hard fought rounds, Golovkin won by unanimous decision with two judges scoring the bout 115–112 and the third scoring it 114–113, all in favour of Golovkin.

According to CompuBox stats, Golovkin landed a total of 243 (33.7%) punches out of 720, with 136 (43.3%) of 314 power punches, while Derevyanchenko landed a total of 230 (31.2%) punches out of 738, with 138 (29.3%) out of 472 power punches—the most an opponent has landed on Golovkin to date. In a post fight interview, promoter Eddie Hearn, who lead the promotion of DAZN in the U.S., stated: "...he won't say it, but Gennady has been ill, basically all week", alluding to the reason Golovkin did not appear on top form during the fight.

==== Golovkin vs. Szeremeta ====
Golovkin faced mandatory IBF challenger Kamil Szeremeta on 18 December 2020. Quickly establishing his powerful jab, Golovkin dropped Szeremeta to the canvas at the end of the first round from an uppercut followed by a left hand. Golovkin scored another knockdown in round two from a right hand followed by two more knockdowns in rounds four and seven. Between rounds seven and eight, the referee walked to Szeremeta's corner and stopped the bout. CompuBox statistics showed that Golovkin outlanded Szeremeta 228 to 59 and outlanded in jabs 94 to 10. Golovkin landed 56% of his power punches through the fight.

==== Golovkin vs. Murata ====
After multiple rumours of a unification match between Golovkin and WBA (Super) champion Ryōta Murata, it was announced on 27 October 2021 that a deal had been agreed between the two to stage the bout in the latter's home country of Japan, at the Saitama Super Arena in Saitama on 29 December 2021. On 2 December 2021, it was announced that the bout was postponed indefinitely due to announced restrictions in response to the rising Omicron variant of COVID-19 that prohibited foreigners from visiting Japan. The fight was eventually rescheduled for 9 April 2022.

On the night, Golovkin defeated Murata by ninth-round technical knockout. In his first fight in over a year, Golovkin made a slow start, with Murata landing the more meaningful punches in the early rounds, sustaining attacks to the body of Golovkin. From the fifth round onward, Golovkin settled into the fight, hurting his opponent as Murata's output dropping as the fight progressed. In the ninth round, Golovkin knocked his opponent down, prompting Murata's corner to throw in the towel.

=== Super middleweight ===
==== Golovkin vs. Álvarez III ====
On 24 May 2022, it was announced that Golovkin would be moving up to compete in the super middleweight division for the first time in his career, to face Canelo Álvarez on 17 September at the T-Mobile Arena in Paradise, Nevada, in a trilogy bout for the latter's undisputed super middleweight titles.

Golovkin lost the fight via unanimous decision with two judges scoring the fight 115–113 and the other judge had it 116–112, all in Álvarez's favor.

==== Vacating the middleweight titles ====
After the loss to Álvarez, Golovkin continued to hold the WBA (Super), IBF and IBO middleweight titles. On 8 February 2023, he vacated the IBF title after being ordered to face mandatory challenger Esquiva Falcão. On 9 March 2023, Golovkin relinquished the WBA (Super) title after being ordered to face WBA (Regular) champion Erislandy Lara. It was also confirmed that Golovkin would be taking a break from boxing for an "indefinite period of time." On 14 June 2023 IBO President Ed Levine announced that Golovkin had vacated his IBO world title. In November 2025, before becoming president of World Boxing, he did not rule out a return to the ring as a boxer and did not rule out retirement.

== Fighter profile ==
=== Boxing style ===
A pressure fighter, Golovkin is known for his powerful and precise punching, balance, and movement inside the ring. With a streak of 23 knockouts that spanned from 2008 to 2016, he holds the highest knockout-to-win ratio – 88.1% – in middleweight championship history. Golovkin was never knocked down or otherwise stopped in a total of 395 fights, 45 as a professional and 350 as an amateur.

=== Training ===
Golovkin is known for his hard sparring sessions, in which he often sparred with much larger opponents. Golovkin's notable regular sparring partners include Darnell Boone, David Benavidez, and brothers John and Julius Jackson.

Golovkin's ex-trainer Abel Sanchez praised him for his work ethic and humility: "He has been that way since I first got him eight years ago. He is humble and shy guy, like you see him now, and it's actually pretty pleasant to be around somebody like that, who's not just 'foam at the mouth' and trying to say who he's gonna kill next." Sanchez also stated that until 2019 Golovkin did not have a strength and conditioning coach or a nutritionist, for he prefers a traditional cuisine and training regimen, and because of Sanchez's determination to not have any assistants: "Along the track of Gennady being who he has become, I would get consistently emails, and messages, and letters from coaches, and nutritionists, and strength and conditioning coaches, that would tell me that if I use them, and if I bring them in, they promised me that they can make Gennady 50% better than he is right now. Could you imagine that? We couldn't get fights before! If he was 50% better we wouldn't be able to get any fights! He would be destroying everybody, there would be nobody that he could fight."

== Personal life ==
In 2006, Golovkin moved from his native Kazakhstan to Stuttgart, Germany, and then in 2013 to train with Abel Sanchez at Big Bear, California. In 2014, he moved to Santa Monica, California, where he lives with his family. He trains in Big Bear, California.

He and his wife Alina have a son and a daughter.

Golovkin speaks four languages: Kazakh, Russian, German, and English.

His fraternal twin brother Maxim, an amateur boxer, joined Gennady's camp and team in 2012.

Golovkin said he wanted his son to attend school in California because his training camp, team and promotions are based in California, he has many friends there and he considers it a beautiful place. Golovkin's favorite food is beef.

Golovkin enjoys playing games with his son and spending time with his family.

In an interview with Kazakh media, Golovkin said that he was frequently approached in the U.S. by ad- and film-making people, who asked him to make guest appearances, co-star in movies or appear in other media. Though he described himself as a media-friendly person, he added, "I avoid starring in movies, appear on magazine covers. I love boxing, and I don't want to divert from it. Right now my sports career is more important for me."

In October 2025, Golovkin was included in the International Boxing Hall of Fame (IBHOF) Class of 2026 ballot.

== Professional boxing record ==
45 fights	42 wins	2 losses
By knockout	37	0
By decision	5	2
Draws	1	

No.	Result	Record	Opponent	Type	Round, time	Date	Location	Notes
45	Loss	42–2–1	Canelo Álvarez	UD	12	17 Sep 2022	T-Mobile Arena, Paradise, Nevada, US	For WBA (Super), WBC, IBF, WBO, and The Ring super middleweight titles
44	Win	42–1–1	Ryōta Murata	TKO	9 (12), 2:11	9 Apr 2022	Super Arena, Saitama, Japan	Retained IBF and IBO middleweight titles; Won WBA (Super) middleweight title
43	Win	41–1–1	Kamil Szeremeta	RTD	7 (12), 3:00	18 Dec 2020	Seminole Hard Rock Hotel & Casino, Hollywood, Florida, US	Retained IBF and IBO middleweight titles
42	Win	40–1–1	Sergiy Derevyanchenko	UD	12	5 Oct 2019	Madison Square Garden, New York City, New York, US	Won vacant IBF and IBO middleweight titles
41	Win	39–1–1	Steve Rolls	KO	4 (12), 2:09	8 Jun 2019	Madison Square Garden, New York City, New York, US	
40	Loss	38–1–1	Canelo Álvarez	MD	12	15 Sep 2018	T-Mobile Arena, Paradise, Nevada, US	Lost WBA (Super), WBC, and IBO middleweight titles; For vacant The Ring middleweight title
39	Win	38–0–1	Vanes Martirosyan	KO	2 (12), 1:53	5 May 2018	StubHub Center, Carson, California, US	Retained WBA (Super), WBC, and IBO middleweight titles
38	Draw	37–0–1	Canelo Álvarez	SD	12	16 Sep 2017	T-Mobile Arena, Paradise, Nevada, US	Retained WBA (Super), WBC, IBF, and IBO middleweight titles; For The Ring middleweight title
37	Win	37–0	Daniel Jacobs	UD	12	18 Mar 2017	Madison Square Garden, New York City, New York, US	Retained WBA (Super), WBC, IBF, and IBO middleweight titles; IBF middleweight title at stake only for Golovkin after Jacobs missed same-day weight
36	Win	36–0	Kell Brook	TKO	5 (12), 1:52	10 Sep 2016	The O2 Arena, London, England	Retained WBC, IBF, and IBO middleweight titles
35	Win	35–0	Dominic Wade	KO	2 (12), 2:37	23 Apr 2016	The Forum, Inglewood, California, US	Retained WBA (Super), IBF, IBO, and WBC interim middleweight titles
34	Win	34–0	David Lemieux	TKO	8 (12), 1:32	17 Oct 2015	Madison Square Garden, New York City, New York, US	Retained WBA (Super), IBO, and WBC interim middleweight titles; Won IBF middleweight title
33	Win	33–0	Willie Monroe Jr.	TKO	6 (12), 0:45	16 May 2015	The Forum, Inglewood, California, US	Retained WBA (Super), IBO, and WBC interim middleweight titles
32	Win	32–0	Martin Murray	TKO	11 (12), 0:50	21 Feb 2015	Salle des Etoiles, Monte Carlo, Monaco	Retained WBA (Super), IBO, and WBC interim middleweight titles
31	Win	31–0	Marco Antonio Rubio	KO	2 (12), 1:19	18 Oct 2014	StubHub Center, Carson, California, US	Retained WBA (Super) and IBO middleweight titles; Won WBC interim middleweight title
30	Win	30–0	Daniel Geale	TKO	3 (12), 2:47	26 Jul 2014	Madison Square Garden, New York City, New York, US	Retained WBA (Super) and IBO middleweight titles
29	Win	29–0	Osumanu Adama	TKO	7 (12), 1:20	1 Feb 2014	Salle des Etoiles, Monte Carlo, Monaco	Retained WBA and IBO middleweight titles
28	Win	28–0	Curtis Stevens	RTD	8 (12), 3:00	2 Nov 2013	The Theater at Madison Square Garden, New York City, New York, US	Retained WBA and IBO middleweight titles
27	Win	27–0	Matthew Macklin	KO	3 (12), 1:22	29 Jun 2013	Foxwoods Resort Casino, Ledyard, Connecticut, US	Retained WBA and IBO middleweight titles
26	Win	26–0	Nobuhiro Ishida	KO	3 (12), 2:11	30 Mar 2013	Salle des Etoiles, Monte Carlo, Monaco	Retained WBA and IBO middleweight titles
25	Win	25–0	Gabriel Rosado	TKO	7 (12), 2:46	19 Jan 2013	The Theater at Madison Square Garden, New York City, New York, US	Retained WBA and IBO middleweight titles
24	Win	24–0	Grzegorz Proksa	TKO	5 (12), 1:11	1 Sep 2012	Turning Stone Resort Casino, Verona, New York, US	Retained WBA (Regular) and IBO middleweight titles
23	Win	23–0	Makoto Fuchigami	TKO	3 (12), 1:17	12 May 2012	Ice Palace "Terminal", Kyiv, Ukraine	Retained WBA (Regular) and IBO middleweight titles
22	Win	22–0	Lajuan Simon	KO	1 (12), 2:17	9 Dec 2011	Ballsaal Interconti-Hotel, Düsseldorf, Germany	Retained WBA (Regular) middleweight title; Won vacant IBO middleweight title
21	Win	21–0	Kassim Ouma	TKO	10 (12), 1:57	17 Jun 2011	Roberto Durán Arena, Panama City, Panama	Retained WBA (Regular) middleweight title
20	Win	20–0	Nilson Julio Tapia	KO	3 (12), 2:44	16 Dec 2010	Daulet National Tennis Centre, Astana, Kazakhstan	Retained WBA (Regular) middleweight title
19	Win	19–0	Milton Núñez	KO	1 (12), 0:58	14 Aug 2010	Roberto Durán Arena, Panama City, Panama	Won WBA interim middleweight title
18	Win	18–0	Mikhail Makarov	KO	2 (10), 1:24	21 Nov 2009	Sparkassen-Arena, Kiel, Germany	
17	Win	17–0	John Anderson Carvalho	KO	2 (12), 2:20	11 Jul 2009	Nürburgring, Nürburg, Germany	Won vacant WBO Inter-Continental middleweight title
16	Win	16–0	Anthony Greenidge	KO	5 (10), 0:59	25 Apr 2009	König Palast, Krefeld, Germany	
15	Win	15–0	Javier Alberto Mamani	TKO	1 (10), 2:52	17 Jan 2009	Burg-Wächter Castello, Düsseldorf, Germany	
14	Win	14–0	Malik Dziarra	RTD	2 (10), 3:00	22 Nov 2008	Stadthalle, Rostock, Germany	
13	Win	13–0	Amar Amari	UD	8	21 Jun 2008	Brøndby Hall, Copenhagen, Denmark	
12	Win	12–0	Ibrahim Sid	TKO	8 (8), 0:26	10 May 2008	Brandberge Arena, Halle, Germany	
11	Win	11–0	Ian Gardner	UD	8	5 Apr 2008	Burg-Wächter Castello, Düsseldorf, Germany	
10	Win	10–0	Tshepo Mashego	KO	1 (8), 2:04	29 Feb 2008	Alsterdorfer Sporthalle, Hamburg, Germany	
9	Win	9–0	Mehdi Bouadla	UD	8	7 Sep 2007	Burg-Wächter Castello, Düsseldorf, Germany	
8	Win	8–0	Sergey Khomitsky	TKO	5 (8), 1:59	25 May 2007	Fight Night Arena, Cologne, Germany	
7	Win	7–0	Simon Mokoena	RTD	5 (8), 3:00	27 Feb 2007	Kugelbake-Halle, Cuxhaven, Germany	
6	Win	6–0	Sylvain Gomis	KO	4 (6), 1:00	2 Dec 2006	Estrel Hotel, Berlin, Germany	
5	Win	5–0	Jorge Ariel Garcia	KO	2 (6), 2:28	21 Oct 2006	Brandberge Arena, Halle, Germany	
4	Win	4–0	Martins Kukulis	RTD	2 (4), 3:00	19 Sep 2006	Kugelbake-Halle, Cuxhaven, Germany	
3	Win	3–0	Daniel Urbanski	RTD	3 (4), 3:00	22 Aug 2006	Universum Gym, Hamburg, Germany	
2	Win	2–0	Sergei Navarka	TKO	3 (4), 1:10	29 Jul 2006	König Pilsener Arena, Oberhausen, Germany	
1	Win	1–0	Gabor Balogh	KO	1 (4), 1:28	6 May 2006	Burg-Wächter Castello, Düsseldorf, Germany	

== Titles in boxing ==
=== Major world titles ===
- WBA (Regular and Super) middleweight champion (Note: Held the WBA (Regular) title as Primary champion from November 2, 2012 – June 3, 2014; Promoted to and held the WBA (Super) title from June 3, 2014 – September 15, 2018 and again from April 9, 2022 – March 9, 2023.) (160 lbs) (2×)
- WBC middleweight champion (160 lbs)
- IBF middleweight champion (160 lbs) (2×)

=== Secondary major world titles ===
- WBA (Regular) middleweight champion (Note: Held the WBA (Regular) title as Secondary champion from October 14, 2010 – November 2, 2012.) (160 lbs)

=== Interim world titles ===
- WBA interim middleweight champion (160 lbs)
- WBC interim middleweight champion (160 lbs)

=== Minor world titles ===
- IBO middleweight champion (160 lbs) (2×)

=== Regional/International titles ===
- WBO Inter-Continental middleweight champion (160 lbs)

=== Honorary titles ===
- WBC Huichol II champion
- WBC Chiapaneco I champion

== Pay-per-view bouts ==
=== Professional boxing ===
United States
No.	Date	Fight	Billing	Buys	Network	Revenue
1	17 October 2015	Golovkin vs. Lemieux	Golovkin vs. Lemieux	153,000	HBO	$8,000,000
2	18 March 2017	Golovkin vs. Jacobs	Middleweight Madness	170,000	HBO	$10,000,000
3	16 September 2017	Canelo vs. Golovkin	Supremacy	1,300,000	HBO	$110,000,000
4	15 September 2018	Canelo vs. Golovkin II	Canelo vs. GGG 2	1,100,000	HBO	$120,000,000
5	17 September 2022	Canelo vs. Golovkin III	The Trilogy	1,060,000	DAZN	$79,500,000
	Total			3,783,000		$327,500,000

United Kingdom
Date	Fight	Network	Buys	Revenue
10 September 2016	Golovkin vs. Brook	Sky Box Office	752,000	£15,000,000
Total			752,000	£15,000,000

Totals (approximate): 3,783,000 buys and $327,500,000 in revenue.

== Awards and honors ==
=== Boxing awards ===
- WBN Fighter of the Year: 2013, 2014, 2015, 2017
- WBN Fight of the Year: 2018
- Fighter of the Year by the readers of The Ring magazine: 2013, 2017
- The Ring magazine Event of the Year: 2017
- The Ring magazine Fight of the Year: 2018
- Yahoo Sports Fighter of the Year: 2014, 2015
- Boxing News Fighter of the Year: 2015
- Jersey Joe Walcott Award by the IBF: 2017

=== Honors ===
In April 2025, Golovkin was awarded an honorary doctorate from KIMEP University in recognition of his outstanding contribution to enhancing the international reputation of Kazakhstan.

== Boxing presidencies ==
On 26 February 2024, Golovkin was appointed President of the National Olympic Committee of the Republic of Kazakhstan. In September 2024, he was appointed chair of the World Boxing Olympic Commission. As the only candidate listed on the final ballot, Golovkin was named President of World Boxing in November 2025.

Golovkin played a key role in saving boxing at the LA 2028 Olympics.

== See also ==
- List of world middleweight boxing champions

== Notes and references ==
=== Video references ===
Sporting positions
Regional boxing titles
Vacant Title last held by Sebastian Zbik	WBO Inter-Continental middleweight champion 11 July 2009 – April 2010; Vacated	Vacant Title next held by Max Bursak
Minor world boxing titles
Vacant Title last held by Avtandil Khurtsidze	IBO middleweight champion 9 December 2011 – 15 September 2018; Vacant after loss to Álvarez	Vacant Title next held by Himself
Vacant Title last held by Himself	IBO middleweight champion 5 October 2019 – 14 June 2023; Vacated	Vacant Title next held by Chris Eubank Jr.
Major world boxing titles
Vacant Title last held by Julio César Green	WBA middleweight champion Interim title 14 August 2010 – 14 October 2010; Promoted	Vacant Title next held by Hassan N'Dam N'Jikam
Vacant Title last held by Felix Sturm	WBA middleweight champion Regular title 14 October 2010 – 2 November 2012; Status changed	Vacant Title next held by Daniel Jacobs
Vacant Title last held by Felix Sturm	WBA middleweight champion 2 November 2012 – 3 June 2014; Promoted	Vacant Title next held by Erislandy Lara
Vacant Title last held by Daniel Geale	WBA middleweight champion Super title 3 June 2014 – 15 September 2018	Succeeded by Canelo Álvarez
Vacant Title last held by Marco Antonio Rubio	WBC middleweight champion Interim title 18 October 2014 – 18 May 2016; Promoted	Vacant Title next held by Jermall Charlo
Preceded by David Lemieux	IBF middleweight champion 17 October 2015 – 6 June 2018; Stripped	Vacant Title next held by Daniel Jacobs
Preceded by Canelo Álvarez stripped	WBC middleweight champion 18 May 2016 – 15 September 2018	Succeeded by Canelo Álvarez
Vacant Title last held by Canelo Álvarez	IBF middleweight champion 5 October 2019 – 6 February 2023; Vacated	Vacant Title next held by Vincenzo Gualtieri
Preceded by Ryōta Murata	WBA middleweight champion Super title 9 April 2022 – 9 March 2023; Vacated	Title discontinued
Achievements
Preceded by Andre Ward	The Ring pound for pound #1 boxer 26 September 2017 – 18 September 2018	Succeeded by Vasiliy Lomachenko
Awards
Previous: Anthony Joshua vs. Wladimir Klitschko	The Ring Fight of the Year vs. Canelo Álvarez II; 2018	Next: Naoya Inoue vs. Nonito Donaire
Records
Preceded by Sam Soliman; 40 years, 329 days	Oldest middleweight world champion 4 March 2023 – 12 March 2024	Succeeded by Erislandy Lara; 40 years, 336 days
