= David Lemieux (boxer) =

Canadian boxer (born 1988)

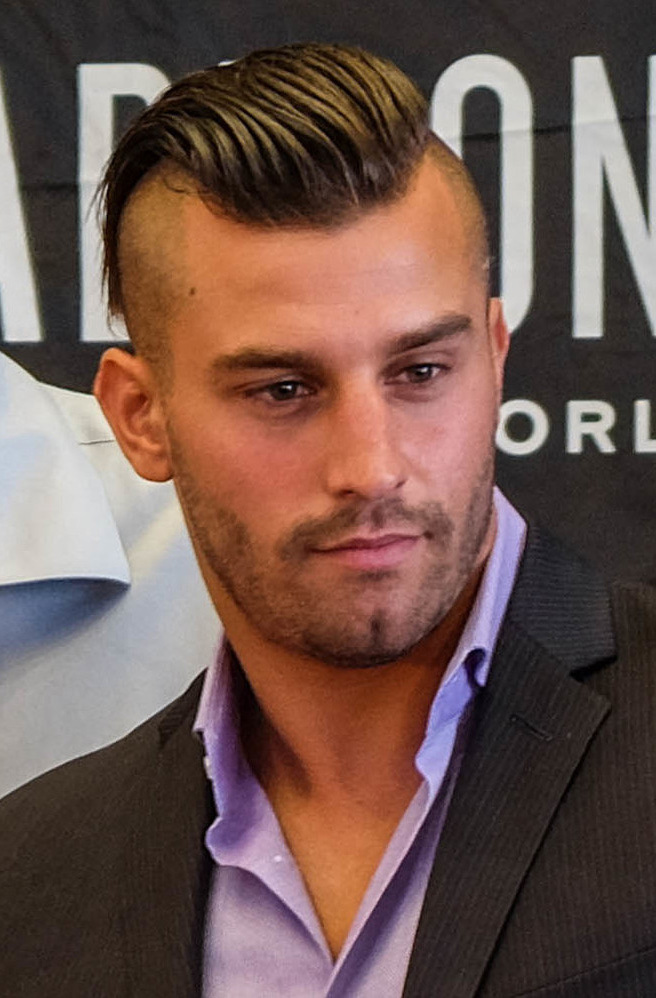
- Lemieux in 2015

Personal information
- Nickname: The Demolisher
- Born: December 22, 1988 (age 37) Montreal, Quebec, Canada
- Height: 5 ft 9 in (175 cm)
- Weight: Light middleweight; Middleweight; Super middleweight

Boxing career
- Reach: 70 in (178 cm)
- Stance: Orthodox

Boxing record
- Total fights: 48
- Wins: 43
- Win by KO: 36
- Losses: 5

David Lemieux (born December 22, 1988) is a Canadian former professional boxer who competed from 2007 to 2022. He held the IBF middleweight title in 2015.

== Early life ==
Lemieux was born in Montreal, Quebec, on December 22, 1988, to André Lemieux, a French Canadian, and Aznive Khavloudjian, an Armenian from Lebanon. The couple divorced after having one son, Kevinshire, two years senior to David. David was born after the departure of his father.

His mother remarried to an Armenian, Garo Melekian, who adopted the two children and became a mentor to David. Lemieux studied at the local Saint-François-de-Laval school, in the Ahuntsic district of Montréal, but did not excel in classes, spending most of time on the streets. He was eventually expelled from the school for street fights. Encouraged by his adoptive father to focus, he started training in Ring 83 located in Ahuntsic at the invitation of boxer Baha Laham, a neighbour of Lemieux.

== Amateur career ==
Lemieux began boxing at the age of nine. He won the Canadian Amateur Championship three times.

Lemieux lost his first four amateur fights, but then won 16 straight fights, including four national junior titles.

Lemieux is currently trained by Marc Ramsay. Previously, he was trained by Russ Anber and was featured with Anber in DVD tutorial series Title Boxing as a teenager. He also featured with Anber in the Rival Box tips series.

Lemieux was never interested in making a bid to join the Canadian Olympic boxing team which was woefully under-supported in the run-up to the Beijing Olympics. Instead, he and Russ Anber viewed the Olympic program as a dead-end which would have him competing against boxers with vastly more experience while limiting his training prospects in ways detrimental to a fighter with professional aspirations.

He finished his amateur career with 91 wins and 12 defeats.

== Professional career ==
=== Early career ===
Although Lemieux planned to turn pro at 17, he was required to wait until he turned 18 because of Canadian Boxing Federation rules. Quebec-based promotion company Groupe Yvon Michel (GYM) was quick to sign him to a multi-fight contract, pitting him against opponents in four-round bouts that quickly became crowd favorites in Montreal. Lemieux became a proven commodity, fighting televised six-rounders on ESPN's Friday Night Fights and filling out the undercard during several championship events. Lemieux won his first 20 bouts, all inside the distance.

==== Lemieux vs. Rubio ====
On March 11, 2011, it was announced that Lemieux would appear in a WBC final eliminator against Marco Antonio Rubio (49–5–1, 43 KOs) at the Bell Centre in Montreal, Quebec, on April 8 in the main event of ESPN's Friday Night Fights. Lemieux was favored to win in his hometown against the Mexican veteran. He came into the fight with a perfect record of 25 wins and no losses, with 24 wins inside the distance. Both fighters came in at 159 pounds. During the first five rounds, Lemieux dominated Rubio by landing hard power punches to his guard. Rubio came to life in round six and began to land hard punches as Lemieux tired. In the seventh round, Rubio knocked down Lemieux with a right hook to the head. Lemieux got up, but Rubio continued where he left off and threw more punches at him. With only seconds left in round seven, Lemieux's corner had seen enough and threw in the towel to stop the fight. After the fight Anber said that Lemieux still has a lot to work and improve on if he wants to reach the top level.

==== Lemieux vs. Alcine ====
In October 2011, Lemieux signed a deal with Eye of the Tiger Management. At the same time, his promoter Groupe Yvon Michel, announced that he would next fight former WBA light middleweight champion Joachim Alcine (32–2–1, 19 KOs) on December 10 at the Bell Centre in Montreal. In a huge upset, Alcine defeated Lemieux. Lemieux was quoted as a 5 to 1 favorite by the wagertrackers. The fight was declared a majority decision over 12 rounds, with scores of 116–112 by two judges and an even scoring of 114–114 by the third one. Alcine was awarded the WBC International Middleweight title. Most ringside observers thought Alcine won the fight. Speaking after the fight, Lemieux praised Alcine, however felt he did enough, "I tip my hat to him, he's a true champion. I really thought I won. Now I have to return to the gym and start working out. I was prepared for this fight and took it very seriously, but I may have mismanaged my energy. Joachim, he knew what he had to do. I know what mistakes I made and I know that I can beat him." Yvon Michel admitted they underestimated Alcine. Alcine contemplated a move back down to light middleweight, but stated he was open to a rematch.

=== Rise up the ranks ===
After the Alcine fight, Lemieux fought six straight bouts against opponents of mostly middling relevance, before facing Fernando Guerrero, a former light middleweight and middleweight contender who had only a year prior fought WBO middleweight champion Peter Quillin to a sixth round loss. The fight took place on the undercard of the WBC light heavyweight fight Stevenson vs. Fonfara on May 24, 2014. Lemieux dominated Guerrero, repeatedly dropping him before finishing him off in the third round with a brutal right uppercut. Lemieux won the NABF middleweight title with this win.

==== Lemieux vs. Rosado ====
His next bout was confirmed on October 20, 2014, to take place Barclays Center in Brooklyn against fringe contender Gabriel Rosado (21–8, 13 KOs), defending his NABF middleweight belt on December 6. The fight was promoted by Golden Boy Promotions as a 'one-off' deal, according to Lemieux's manager Camille Estephan. Going into the fight, Lemieux wanted to take the opportunity to introduce himself as a threat to the middleweight division. The fight was shown live on HBO Boxing After Dark. Lemieux similarly dominated Rosado, dropping him in the third and pounding away at his mostly outmatched foe until the referee stopped the bout in the tenth due to swelling and cuts surrounding Rosado's eyes. It was the first HBO televised bout for Lemieux, who was hoping to challenge unified middleweight champion Gennady Golovkin in the near future. In the post-fight interview, Lemieux praised Rosado, "Hats off to Rosado. He is one hell of a fighter. I had tremendous preparation. I wanted to show all of you what I could do. I wanted to make a statement. Rosado is even better than I thought. I hope you enjoyed it." There was 6,532 in attendance for the fight. At the time of stoppage, Lemieux was ahead 90–80, 89-81 and 88–82 on all three judges scorecards. According to CompuBox stats, Lemieux landed 227 of 621 punches thrown (37%) and Rosado landed 142 of his 398 thrown (36%) The fight averaged 906,000 viewers and peaked at 1.16 million viewers.

=== IBF middleweight champion ===
==== Lemieux vs. N'Dam ====
In February 2015, Lemieux accepted a fight against former interim WBO titleholder Hassan N'Dam N'Jikam (31–1, 18 KOs) for the vacant IBF middleweight championship. N'Dam became the mandatory challenger when he defeated Curtis Stevens in October 2014. Then-IBF champion Jermain Taylor, was facing legal issues, thus stripped of the title. The IBF originally ordered N'Dam vs. Felix Sturm for the vacant title, however Sturm stated he no longer wished to fight at 160 pounds. The IBF then ordered British contender Billy Joe Saunders, however he also passed as he was already mandated to fight for the WBO title. IBF then turned to their #5 ranked Lemieux. The purse bid was won by Golden Boy, who were the only promoter to turn up and bid the minimunt required $102,000 for the fight. On May 13, Golden Boy and Eye of the Tiger Management announced the fight would take place at the Bell Centre in Montreal on June 20. With over two weeks to go, it was confirmed the fight would be televised live on Fox Sports 2. HBO, who has recently signed Lemieux were unable to squeeze the bout into their boxing schedule for unknown reasons. Lemieux scored four knockdowns en route to a victory by unanimous decision. Two judges scored the bout 115-109 while the third saw it 114-110 for Lemieux, who improved to 34–2 with 31 knockouts. Over the 12 rounds, Lemieux landed 216 of 597 punches thrown (36%), while N'Dam landed 202 of his 627 thrown (32%). Lemieux out landed N'Dam in 4 of the rounds. Rounds 6, 7, 9 and 10 saw both fighters land equal amount of punches. The whole card only averaged 163,000 viewers. The win set up a showdown in October with unbeaten Golovkin, considered to be the best middleweight fighter in the world in 2015.

==== Lemieux vs. Golovkin ====
It was announced in July 2015 that Gennady Golovkin would be defending his three world titles against Lemieux in a unification fight at the Madison Square Garden in New York City on October 17, 2015, live by HBO Pay-Per-View. Both boxers took to Twitter to announce the news. Lemieux won the then vacant IBF title by outpointing Hassan N'Dam N'Jikam in June 2015.

Lemieux lost the IBF middleweight title to Golovkin before a sold-out crowd of 20,548 at Madison Square Garden. Lemieux was down once in round 5. Golovkin was dominant from the first bell, landing punch after punch before the referee mercifully stepped in and stopped the fight in the eighth round. Golovkin was also ahead on all three judges scorecards (70-62 3 times). Lemieux earned a career high payday of $1.5 million and was guaranteed a share of PPV revenue whilst Golovkin earned a career high $2 million also including a share of the PPV profits. According to CompuBox statistics, Lemieux only landed 89 of 335 punches thrown (27%). Golovkin had a connect rate of 51% landing 280 of 549 punches.

=== Comeback trail ===
It was announced on March 17, 2016, that Lemieux would fight on the undercard of Canelo-Khan at the new T-Mobile Arena in Las Vegas on May 7, 2016. His opponent was announced to be Glen Tapia (23–2, 15 KOs), who was newly signed to Golden Boy and moving up in weight. Lemieux was due to fight against James De La Rosa a week earlier at a 163lb catchweight, but he failed to make weight, many believe this was done intentionally so he could fight at the new arena. Lemieux showed an improved jab, footwork and head movement. He dominated the fight, shaking Tapia numerous times leading into the fourth round where he knocked Tapia down. Tapia's trainer Freddie Roach waved the fight off right after.

After a few months of trying to negotiate a deal to fight Curtis Stevens, it was confirmed by Eye of the Tiger promotions that Lemieux would be fighting unknown Argentine Cristian Fabian Rios (21–7–3, 6 KOs) at the Centre Bell in Montreal on October 22. Lemieux was taken the distance only the fourth time in his career as he won a one-sided 10 round unanimous decision. Lemieux attempted to score a knockout, but wasn't able to get the job done against a durable Rios. The three judges scored the fight 100–90, 100-90 and 99–91. The win ensured Lemieux a possible future fight against the likes of Saul Alvarez or WBO middleweight champion Billy Joe Saunders in early 2017.

==== Lemieux vs. Stevens ====
On January 16, 2017, a fight between Lemieux and former world title challenger Curtis Stevens (29–5, 21 KOs) was finally agreed to main event a HBO: Boxing After Dark card on March 11 at the Turning Stone Resort & Casino in Verona, New York. Lemieux won the fight after he knocked Stevens out with a short left hook. The referee Charlie Fitch waived the count immediately after Stevens was left unconscious The stoppage took place in round 3, at 1 minute and 59 seconds. Emergency personnel entered the ring immediately to attend to Stevens. He was conscious however whilst being stretchered out of the arena. The fight averaged 606,000 viewers and peaked at 672,000 viewers for HBO. On Sunday morning following the fight, Stevens representatives confirmed he was OK.

Only a month after knocking out Stevens, Lemieux was added to the Canelo vs. Chavez Jr. undercard at the T-Mobile Arena in Nevada on May 6, 2017. His opponent was announced as 29 year old Mexican boxer Marcos Reyes (35–4, 26 KOs) in a 10-round fight. Reyes, being (3-3) in his last six bouts, was known for going the 10 round distance in a losing effort to Julio Cesar Chavez Jr. in 2015. Both fighters agreed a catch-weight for the fight and weighed in at 163 pounds. It was reported that Lemieux would earn $200,000 compared to Reyes who would earn $45,000. Lemieux won the fight by unanimous decision. The judges scored the fight 99–90, 99-90 and 98–91 in his favor. Lemieux landed the harder and cleaner punches throughout the fight. Reyes showed great determination and stayed on his feet landing quick combinations, although receiving a cut above the right eye in round 2. Reyes also lost a point in round 8 for hitting after the bell. Lemieux gave a good effort from the start, but started to tire out through the middle rounds, although he did enough to still win them, landing the bigger punches. Lemieux got his second wind in round 8, but still did not have the same power that we'd seen in the early rounds.

==== Lemieux vs. Saunders ====
Lemieux made himself available as Miguel Cotto's final opponent, which would take place on December 2, 2017, on HBO at Madison Square Garden. According to a source, regardless of who Cotto fought, Lemieux would still appear on the card. After weeks of going back and forth with WBO champion Billy Joe Saunders (25–0, 12 KOs) on Twitter, on October 10, the WBO ordered them to meet in a mandatory fight with both camps having 30 days to negotiate a fight, which would likely take place early in 2018. On October 16, Lemieux's manager Camille Estephan stated the negotiations were going well for the fight and could possibly take place at the Bell Centre in Canada on December 16, 2017. He also stated that HBO were interested showcasing the fight. On October 17, WBO confirmed the fight had been signed to take place at the new Place Bell in Laval, Quebec. Lemieux failed in his attempt to regain a world title after losing to Saunders via a wide unanimous decision. The judges scored the fight 120–108, 117–111, 118–110. Both HBO and ESPN scored it a clear 120–108 for Saunders. Saunders picked Lemieux off with shots as he would plod forward trying to connect with his big power shots. The difference in hand speed and skills were vast. Saunders used his movement and jab effectively. Lemieux was never able to catch up to Saunders to land his big power shots. In the post-fight, Lemieux said, "I wasn't at my best. Hats off to Billy Joe, but as of the second round, my left hand, I couldn't use it the way I wanted to. And he was on the run, so I had a little bit of difficulties throwing my shots. So I gotta say it wasn't my best night." CompuBox showed that Saunders landed 165 of 430 punches (38%) and Lemieux landed 67 of his 356 thrown (19%). Saunders earned a minimum $1 million purse while Lemieux took home a $500,000 guaranteed purse. The fight averaged 716,000 viewers, peaking at 775,000 viewers.

A few days after the fight, Camille Estephan confirmed that Lemieux would be staying a middleweight, however will not be expected to fight until after April 2018 as he needed to rehab his shoulder.

=== Later career ===
On April 11, 2018, sources in Canada stated that Lemieux would return to the ring on May 26 in Quebec, Canada and a press conference would be announced by Eye of the Tiger Management. A day later, it was officially announced that Lemieux would fight French boxer Karim Achour (26–4–3, 4 KOs) at the Videotron Centre, with Achour's WBC international title at stake as well as the vacant WBC Francophone title. Going into the fight, Achour had not been stopped in his 4 losses and was unbeaten in 13 fights dating back to March 2013. Lemieux weighed 162 pounds. He was given time to reduce his weight further, however within an hour, Camille Estephan told the officials that Lemieux would not be making the middleweight limit. Estephan told the Journal de Montreal, Lemieux had a disciplined training camp, however before the night of the weigh in, he went to bed weighing 164 pounds. At that point, he knew he would not be able to lose the additional weight and thought about his own health first. On fight night, Lemieux dominated Achour through the bout, eventually dropping him in round 12, winning the fight via a wide unanimous decision. The scorecards were 119–108, 120-107 and 119–107.

==== Lemieux vs. O'Sullivan ====
In July 2018, Estephan began negotiating a deal for Lemieux to fight Irish boxer Gary O'Sullivan (28–2, 21 KOs) in the fall. The fight was likely to take place on the undercard of the Álvarez vs. Golovkin rematch, where O'Sullivan was already guaranteed a spot to fight. Lemieux had also been chasing the fight himself and taken to social media for months. After winning defeating Elias Espadas on July 21, Olympic medalist Yamaguchi Falcão, (16–0, 7 KOs) also made it known that he would fight Lemieux in September 2018. On August 1, via Irishboxing.com, O'Sulivan accepted the challenge and signed the contract a week later, awaiting confirmation of purse information. On August 20, the fight was made official. Lemieux won the fight via knockout after just 2 minutes and 44 seconds of round 1. Lemieux took advantage of a slow left hook thrown by O'Sullivan to counter him with a big left to the head which knocked him down. Referee Russell Mora stopped the fight almost immediately. After the fight, Lemieux said, "There's not a middleweight like David Lemieux. I felt great. I'm in superb shape. I give you guys great knockouts, great fights, and I hope you're happy." Despite the pre-fight trash talk, the two boxers embraced in the ring after the bout. For the bout Lemieux made $200,000 and O'Sullivan received a $400,000.

On October 31, 2018, it was first reported that Lemieux would appear on the Canelo Álvarez vs. Rocky Fielding undercard at Madison Square Garden on December 15, 2018. According to TVA Sports, Lemieux would be fighting Bahamian boxer Tureano Johnson (20–2, 14 KOs). On November 15, CBS Sports announced the undercard, which included Lemieux vs. Johnson. Speaking about the fight, Lemieux stated he did not take a break after his win over O'Sullivan and went back to the gym to start another training camp, with the ultimate goal being a world title fight against Álvarez. The fight was cancelled on the morning of the weigh-in after Lemieux was hospitalized due to severe dehydration.

==== Lemieux vs. Bursak ====
On December 7, 2019, Lemieux fought Max Bursak. Bursak dropped Lemieux twice, once in the opening round and once in the fifth round. Lemieux returned the favor, dropping Bursak in the sixth round. In the end, Lemieux did enough to earn the split-decision victory over Bursak, winning 94–93 on two of the scorecards, while the third scorecard was 93–94 in favor of Bursak.

==== Lemieux vs. Ntetu ====
On October 10, 2020, Lemieux fought and defeated Francy Ntetu in five rounds. Lemieux caught his opponent with big left hook and knocked him out to end the fight early.

==== Lemieux vs. Benavidez ====
On May 21, 2022, Benavidez and Lemieux faced off in a defending title match where ultimately Benavidez won in the 3rd round by TKO becoming the interim WBC super middleweight champion. Lemieux earned the respect of many in this match-up, showing a big heart when he continued to fight even though he received hard punches early in the first few rounds that had him dazed.

== Personal life ==
Lemieux identifies himself as both Québécois and Armenian. He is a resident of Cartierville, a Montreal suburb. Lemieux has a son, Léon from a previous relationship, the mother later left to Moscow. A second child; a daughter who speaks Armenian as her first language, was born through another relationship. Lemieux speaks five languages: French, English, Armenian, Arabic, and Spanish (with French & English being his primary two languages of everyday use). On August 3, 2021, he proposed to and got engaged to Canadian Olympic diver Jennifer Abel.

Lemieux was managed for many years by Group Yvon Michel (GYM). Starting January 2015 he was managed by Camille Estephan, a Canadian entrepreneur and promoter and owner of Eye of the Tiger Management (EOTTM).

== Professional boxing record ==
48 fights	43 wins	5 losses
By knockout	36	3
By decision	7	2

No.	Result	Record	Opponent	Type	Round, time	Date	Location	Notes
48	Loss	43–5	David Benavidez	TKO	3 (12), 1:31	May 21, 2022	Gila River Arena, Glendale, Arizona, U.S.	For vacant WBC interim super middleweight title
47	Win	43–4	David Zegarra	TKO	2 (10), 0:19	Jun 4, 2021	Hotel Holiday Inn, Cuernavaca, Mexico	
46	Win	42–4	Francy Ntetu	KO	5 (10), 1:58	Oct 10, 2020	Centre Gervais Auto, Shawinigan, Quebec, Canada	
45	Win	41–4	Max Bursak	SD	10	Dec 7, 2019	Bell Centre, Montreal, Quebec, Canada	
44	Win	40–4	Gary O'Sullivan	KO	1 (12), 2:44	Sep 15, 2018	T-Mobile Arena, Paradise, Nevada, U.S.	
43	Win	39–4	Karim Achour	UD	12	May 26, 2018	Videotron Centre, Quebec City, Quebec, Canada	
42	Loss	38–4	Billy Joe Saunders	UD	12	Dec 16, 2017	Place Bell, Laval, Quebec, Canada	For WBO middleweight title
41	Win	38–3	Marcos Reyes	UD	10	May 6, 2017	T-Mobile Arena, Paradise, Nevada, U.S.	
40	Win	37–3	Curtis Stevens	KO	3 (12), 1:59	Mar 11, 2017	Turning Stone Resort Casino, Verona, New York, U.S.	Won WBC Continental Americas and vacant WBO Inter-Continental middleweight titles
39	Win	36–3	Cristian Rios	UD	10	Oct 22, 2016	Bell Centre, Montreal, Quebec, Canada	
38	Win	35–3	Glen Tapia	TKO	4 (10), 0:56	May 7, 2016	T-Mobile Arena, Paradise, Nevada, U.S.	Won vacant WBO–NABO middleweight title
37	Loss	34–3	Gennady Golovkin	TKO	8 (12), 1:32	Oct 17, 2015	Madison Square Garden, New York City, New York, U.S.	Lost IBF middleweight title; For WBA (Super), IBO, and WBC interim middleweight titles
36	Win	34–2	Hassan N'Dam N'Jikam	UD	12	Jun 20, 2015	Bell Centre, Montreal, Quebec, Canada	Won vacant IBF middleweight title
35	Win	33–2	Gabriel Rosado	TKO	10 (12), 1:45	Dec 6, 2014	Barclays Center, New York City, New York, U.S.	Retained WBC–NABF middleweight title
34	Win	32–2	Fernando Guerrero	KO	3 (12), 1:56	May 24, 2014	Bell Centre, Montreal, Quebec, Canada	Won WBC–NABF middleweight title
33	Win	31–2	Jose Miguel Torres	TKO	7 (10), 1:48	Nov 30, 2013	Colisée Pepsi, Quebec City, Quebec, Canada	
32	Win	30–2	Marcus Upshaw	UD	8	Sep 28, 2013	Bell Centre, Montreal, Quebec, Canada	
31	Win	29–2	Robert Swierzbinski	KO	1 (8), 2:21	Jun 8, 2013	Bell Centre, Montreal, Quebec, Canada	
30	Win	28–2	Albert Ayrapetyan	TKO	2 (10), 1:26	Dec 14, 2012	Bell Centre, Montreal, Quebec, Canada	
29	Win	27–2	Álvaro Gaona	KO	1 (10), 2:48	Oct 12, 2012	Bell Centre, Montreal, Quebec, Canada	
28	Win	26–2	Jaudiel Zepeda	KO	2 (8), 1:47	Jun 8, 2012	Bell Centre, Montreal, Quebec, Canada	
27	Loss	25–2	Joachim Alcine	MD	12	Dec 10, 2011	Bell Centre, Montreal, Quebec, Canada	Lost WBC International middleweight title
26	Loss	25–1	Marco Antonio Rubio	TKO	7 (12), 2:36	Apr 8, 2011	Bell Centre, Montreal, Quebec, Canada	
25	Win	25–0	Purnell Gates	TKO	2 (10), 2:50	Dec 3, 2010	Bell Centre, Montreal, Quebec, Canada	
24	Win	24–0	Héctor Camacho Jr.	KO	1 (12), 3:00	Oct 29, 2010	Bell Centre, Montreal, Quebec, Canada	Retained WBC International middleweight title
23	Win	23–0	Elvin Ayala	KO	1 (12), 2:44	Jun 11, 2010	Uniprix Stadium, Montreal, Quebec, Canada	Won vacant WBC International middleweight title
22	Win	22–0	Walid Smichet	KO	2 (10), 0:57	Apr 3, 2010	Montreal Casino, Montreal, Quebec, Canada	Retained Canada super-middleweight title
21	Win	21–0	Jason Naugler	UD	10	Feb 6, 2010	Montreal Casino, Montreal, Quebec, Canada	Won vacant Canada super-middleweight title
20	Win	20–0	Delray Raines	KO	2 (10), 2:51	Dec 11, 2009	Bell Centre, Montreal, Quebec, Canada	Won vacant WBC Youth Intercontinental middleweight title
19	Win	19–0	Alfredo Contreras	KO	2 (8), 2:57	Nov 7, 2009	Montreal Casino, Montreal, Quebec, Canada	
18	Win	18–0	Donny McCrary	KO	1 (8), 2:07	Oct 3, 2009	Montreal Casino, Montreal, Quebec, Canada	
17	Win	17–0	Bladimir Hernandez	KO	5 (8), 3:00	Aug 28, 2009	Montreal Casino, Montreal, Quebec, Canada	
16	Win	16–0	Martin Avila	TKO	2 (6), 1:17	Jun 19, 2009	Bell Centre, Montreal, Quebec, Canada	
15	Win	15–0	Thomas Davis	KO	1 (6), 0:47	Apr 18, 2009	Montreal Casino, Montreal, Quebec, Canada	
14	Win	14–0	Luis Roberto Reyes	TKO	1 (8), 2:34	Mar 7, 2009	Montreal Casino, Montreal, Quebec, Canada	
13	Win	13–0	Rogelio Sanchez	TKO	3 (6), 3:00	Jan 30, 2009	Bell Centre, Montreal, Quebec, Canada	
12	Win	12–0	Patrick Tessier	TKO	2 (6), 2:50	Nov 1, 2008	Montreal Casino, Montreal, Quebec, Canada	Won vacant QBC light-middleweight title
11	Win	11–0	Lance Moody	KO	1 (6), 2:15	Oct 4, 2008	Montreal Casino, Montreal, Quebec, Canada	
10	Win	10–0	Ulises Duarte	TKO	1 (4), 1:45	Aug 1, 2008	Windsor Station, Montreal, Quebec, Canada	
9	Win	9–0	Oswaldo Gonzalez	TKO	2 (6), 1:53	Jul 11, 2008	Uniprix Stadium, Montreal, Quebec, Canada	
8	Win	8–0	Julio Gonzalez	TKO	2 (6), 2:28	Jun 6, 2008	Uniprix Stadium, Montreal, Quebec, Canada	
7	Win	7–0	Rodney Green	TKO	4 (4), 1:00	May 3, 2008	Montreal Casino, Montreal, Quebec, Canada	
6	Win	6–0	Guillermo Cortez	KO	1 (4), 2:44	Feb 9, 2008	Montreal Casino, Montreal, Quebec, Canada	
5	Win	5–0	Jesus Ortega	KO	1 (4), 1:30	Dec 7, 2007	Bell Centre, Montreal, Quebec, Canada	
4	Win	4–0	Rene Fernandez	KO	2 (4), 2:12	Sep 15, 2007	Montreal Casino, Montreal, Quebec, Canada	
3	Win	3–0	Andres Lovera	KO	2 (4), 2:59	Jun 8, 2007	Uniprix Stadium, Montreal, Quebec, Canada	
2	Win	2–0	Jose Luis Reyes	TKO	2 (4), 1:06	May 12, 2007	Montreal Casino, Montreal, Quebec, Canada	
1	Win	1–0	Jose Candelario Torres	TKO	2 (4), 3:00	Apr 14, 2007	Montreal Casino, Montreal, Quebec, Canada	

== Pay-per-view bouts ==
Date	Fight	Billing	Buys	Network
October 17, 2015	Golovkin vs. Lemieux	Golovkin vs. Lemieux	150,000	HBO

Sporting positions
Regional boxing titles
Vacant Title last held by Sébastien Demers	QBC light-middleweight champion November 1, 2008 – December 2009; Vacated	Vacant
New title	WBC Youth Intercontinental middleweight champion December 11, 2009 – June 11, 2010; Won International title	Vacant Title next held by Marlon Alta
Vacant Title last held by Adonis Stevenson	Canada super-middleweight champion February 6, 2010 – June 2010; Vacated	Vacant Title next held by Adam Trupish
Vacant Title last held by Dmitry Pirog	WBC International middleweight champion June 11, 2010 – December 10, 2011	Succeeded by Joachim Alcine
Vacant Title last held by Curtis Stevens	NABF middleweight champion May 24, 2014 – June 2015; Vacated	Vacant Title next held by Evhen Khytrov
Vacant Title last held by Arif Magomedov	WBO–NABO middleweight champion May 7, 2016 – February 2017; Vacated	Vacant Title next held by Francis Lafreniere
Preceded by Curtis Stevens	WBC Continental Americas middleweight champion March 11, 2017 – December 2017; Vacated	Vacant Title next held by Zhanibek Alimkhanuly
Vacant Title last held by Willie Monroe Jr.	WBO Inter-Continental middleweight champion March 11, 2017 – December 2017; Vacated	Vacant Title next held by Gary O'Sullivan
World boxing titles
Vacant Title last held by Jermain Taylor stripped	IBF middleweight champion June 20, 2015 – October 17, 2015	Succeeded by Gennady Golovkin
Awards
Previous: Canelo Álvarez; KO6 Amir Khan	The Ring Knockout of the Year; KO3 Curtis Stevens; 2017	Next: Naoya Inoue; KO1 Juan Carlos Payano
