= Glen Tapia =

American boxer

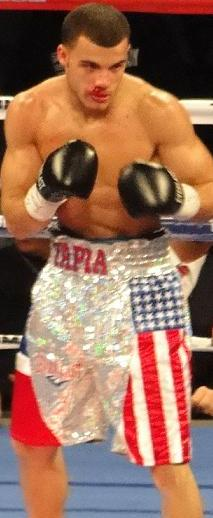
- Tapia in December 2011

Personal information
- Nickname: Jersey Boy
- Born: December 11, 1989 (age 36) Passaic, New Jersey, U.S.
- Height: 5 ft 11 in (180 cm)
- Weight: Light middleweight Middleweight

Boxing career
- Reach: 73 in (185 cm)
- Stance: Orthodox

Boxing record
- Total fights: 30
- Wins: 25
- Win by KO: 17
- Losses: 5

Glen Tapia (born December 11, 1989) is an American professional boxer.

== Personal life ==
Tapia was born and raised in Passaic, New Jersey to Dominican immigrants from Santo Domingo, DR. He is fluent in Spanish.

Glen has a daughter named Isabella Nouvel Tapia with his partner Carolin Francheli.

== Amateur career ==
Tapia compiled an amateur record of 130-13, he competed in the Junior Olympics, as well as placing in a number of silver gloves and junior golden gloves tournaments. Despite this amateur success, his style was much better suited for the pros.

== Professional career ==
Tapia won his pro debut against Edward Smith on December 13, 2008. He scored a six-round decision win against Eberto Medina on March 26, 2011. Tapia suffered his first loss on December 7, 2013, in a brutal fight against James Kirkland in which he was knocked out. This fight prompted Tapia to go back to the drawing board, which included replacing his trainer. Since that fight, Tapia has been trained by six time trainer of the year award winner Freddie Roach, who also trains superstar fighters Manny Pacquiao, Miguel Cotto, Ruslan Provodnikov and others. Tapia scored a second-round knockout over Mike Ruiz on the Miguel Cotto-Antonio Margarito undercard at the Madison Square Garden on December 3, 2011. On May 8, 2015, Tapia lost to Michel Soro.

== Professional record ==
23 Wins (15 Knockouts), 5 Losses (4 Knockouts), 0 Draws
Result	Record	Opponent	Type	Round, Time	Date	Venue and Location	Notes
Loss	23–5	(United States) Gabriel Rosado	TKO	6 (10), 1:15	2017-10-19	(United States) Monte Carlo Resort and Casino, Paradise, Nevada	
Loss	23-4	(Republic of Ireland) Jason Quigley	UD	10	2017-03-23	(United States) Fantasy Springs Casino, Indio, California	
Loss	23-3	(Canada) David Lemieux	TKO	4 (10), 0:56	2016-05-07	(United States) T-Mobile Arena, Las Vegas, Nevada	For vacant WBO-NABO Middleweight title.
Loss	23-2	(France) Michel Soro	TKO	4 (10), 2:10	2015-05-08	(United States) Prudential Center, Newark, New Jersey	For vacant USBA and WBO-NABO Light middleweight titles.
Win	23-1	(Australia) Daniel Dawson	TKO	3 (10), 1:42	2015-03-07	CotaiArena, Macau, China	Won WBO-NABO Light middleweight title.
Win	22-1	(Lithuania) Donatas Bondorovas	TKO	4 (10), 0:47	2014-10-04	(United States) Bally's Atlantic City, Atlantic City, New Jersey	
Win	21-1	(United States) Keenan Collins	TKO	1 (10), 1:22	2014-06-14	(United States) Bally's Atlantic City, Atlantic City, New Jersey	
Loss	20-1	(United States) James Kirkland	TKO	6 (10), 0:38	2013-12-07	(United States) Boardwalk Hall, Atlantic City, New Jersey	
Win	20-0	(Mexico) Elco Garcia	TKO	5 (10), 2:59	2013-09-28	(United States) Bally's Atlantic City, Atlantic City, New Jersey	
Win	19-0	(United States) Abraham Han	RTD	8 (10), 3:00	2013-07-12	(United States) Texas Station Casino, Las Vegas, Nevada	
Win	18-0	(Dominican Republic) Joseph De Los Santos	UD	8	2013-04-13	(United States) Radio City Music Hall, New York City, New York	
Win	17-0	(Ghana) Ayi Bruce	TKO	2 (8), 2:33	2013-01-19	(United States) Madison Square Garden, New York City, New York	
Win	16-0	(United States) Dashon Johnson	UD	6	2012-10-27	(United States) El Paso County Coliseum, El Paso, Texas	
Win	15-0	(Dominican Republic) Franklin Gonzalez	KO	1 (8), 2:05	2012-08-18	(United States) Bally's Atlantic City, Atlantic City, New Jersey	
Win	14-0	(Puerto Rico) Carlos Garcia	TKO	1 (6), 2:00	2012-07-07	Coliseo Antonio R. Barcelo, Toa Baja, Puerto Rico	
Win	13-0	(United States) Manuel Guzman	KO	3 (6), 0:27	2012-04-27	(United States) Reverb Center Reading, Pennsylvania, U.S.	
Win	12-0	(United States) Mike Ruiz	KO	2 (6), 2:27	2011-12-03	(United States) Madison Square Garden, New York City, New York, U.S.	
Win	11-0	(United States) Marcus Thompkins	UD	6	2011-09-16	(United States) Joyce Center, South Bend, Indiana, U.S.	
Win	10-0	(United States) Taronze Washington	UD	6	2011-06-25	(United States) South Philly Arena, Philadelphia, Pennsylvania, U.S.	
Win	9-0	(Ecuador) Eberto Medina	UD	6	2011-03-26	(United States) Boardwalk Hall, Atlantic City, New Jersey, U.S.	
Win	8-0	(United States) Quinton Whitaker	UD	6	2010-10-30	(United States) Bally's Atlantic City, Atlantic City, New Jersey, U.S.	
Win	7-0	(United States) Nick Runningbear	TKO	2 (6), 1:36	2010-06-12	(United States) Madison Square Garden, New York City, New York, U.S.	
Win	6-0	(United States) James Winchester	UD	4	2010-04-17	(United States) Boardwalk Hall, Atlantic City, New Jersey, U.S.	
Win	5-0	(Puerto Rico) Carlos Rodriguez	RTD	3 (4), 0:01	2010-03-20	(United States) Mallory Square, Key West, Florida, U.S.	
Win	4-0	(United States) Tyrone Miles	TKO	1 (4), 1:00	2010-02-27	(United States) Bally's Atlantic City, Atlantic City, New Jersey, U.S.	
Win	3-0	(United States) David Lopez	UD	4	13 Jun 2009	(United States) Madison Square Garden, New York City, New York, U.S.	
Win	2-0	(United States) Juan Carlos De Leon	TKO	2 (4), 0:34	2009-05-01	(United States) Hard Rock Hotel and Casino, Las Vegas, Nevada, U.S.	
Win	1-0	(United States) Edward Smith	TKO	2 (4), 1:00	2008-12-13	(United States) Boardwalk Hall, Atlantic City, New Jersey, U.S.	

== Sparring partners ==
Tapia gained some notoriety in the fall of 2010 when he performed well as a sparring partner for Manny Pacquiao while Pacquiao was getting ready to fight Antonio Margarito.
