= Dominic Wade =

American boxer

Personal information
- Born: April 12, 1990 (age 36) Washington, D.C., U.S.
- Height: 5 ft 10 1/2 in (179 cm)
- Weight: Middleweight; Light heavyweight

Boxing career
- Reach: 74 1/2 in (189 cm)
- Stance: Orthodox

Boxing record
- Total fights: 21
- Wins: 20
- Win by KO: 14
- Losses: 1
- Draws: 0

Dominic Wade (born April 12, 1990) is an American professional boxer.

== Professional career ==
Wade was a featured fighter on Showtime's ShoBox: The New Generation when he fought Sam Soliman in a bout which he won, by split decision, to stay undefeated.

The IBF ordered a championship bout between current IBF champion Gennady Golovkin and top contender Dominic Wade after mandatory contender Tureano Johnson was unable to take the bout with Golovkin due to shoulder injury. The bout took place on April 23, 2016. Wade was knocked out in the second round.

== Professional record ==
19 Wins (13 knockouts, 6 decisions), 1 Losses (1 knockouts, 0 decisions), 0 Draws
No.	Result	Record	Opponent	Type	Round, time	Date	Location	Notes
21	Win	20-1	(Mexico) Josue Obando	TKO	5 (8), 0:46	2019-02-23	(United States) Center Stage, Charlotte, North Carolina	
20	Win	19-1	(Argentina) Martin Fidel Rios	KO	1 (8), 1:48	2019-02-01	(United States) Main Street Armory, Rochester, New York	
19	Loss	18-1	(Kazakhstan) Gennady Golovkin	KO	2 (12), 2:37	2016-04-23	(United States) The Forum, Inglewood, California	For WBA (Super), IBF, IBO and WBC interim middleweight titles
18	Win	18–0	(Australia) Sam Soliman	SD	10 (10)	2015-06-26	(United States) Little Creek Casino Resort, Shelton, Washington	
17	Win	17–0	(United States) Eddie Hunter	TKO	2 (10), 2:08	2014-12-20	(United States) Little Creek Casino Resort, Shelton, Washington	
16	Win	16–0	(United States) Nick Brinson	UD	10 (10)	2014-06-27	(United States) Hard Rock Hotel and Casino, Las Vegas, Nevada	
15	Win	15–0	(United States) Marcus Upshaw	TKO	2 (8), 2:41	2014-04-19	(United States) DC Armory, Washington, D.C.	
14	Win	14–0	(United States) Dashon Johnson	UD	6 (6)	2014-01-25	(United States) DC Armory, Washington, D.C.	
13	Win	13–0	(United States) Roberto Ventura	TKO	1 8), 2:08	2013-10-26	(United States) Boardwalk Hall, Atlantic City, New Jersey	
12	Win	12–0	(United States) Marcus Brooks	TKO	2 (6)	2013-02-22	(United States) DC Armory, Washington, D.C.	
11	Win	11–0	(United States) Grover Young	UD	4 (4)	2011-02-18	(United States) Wicomico Civic Center, Salisbury, Maryland	
10	Win	10–0	(United States) Brian Norman	TKO	6 (6), 2:57	2011-01-29	(United States) Fitzgerald's Casino & Hotel, Tunica, Mississippi	
9	Win	9–0	(United States) Freddie Montoya	KO	2 (6)	2010-09-25	(United States) Fitzgerald's Casino & Hotel, Tunica, Mississippi	
8	Win	8–0	(United States) Troy Lowry	KO	1 (6), 2:29	2010-07-17	(United States) 4 Bears Casino & Lodge, New Town, North Dakota	
7	Win	7–0	(United States) Michael Faulk	UD	4 (4)	2010-05-22	(United States) Fitzgerald's Casino & Hotel, Tunica, Mississippi	
6	Win	6–0	(United States) Robert Kliewer	UD	4 (4)	2010-04-16	(United States) Wicomico Civic Center, Salisbury, Maryland	
5	Win	5–0	(United States) Bradley Thompson	TKO	1 (4), 0:19	2009-11-21	(United States) Fitzgerald's Casino & Hotel, Tunica, Mississippi	
4	Win	4–0	(United States) Tyrone Dowdy	TKO	1 (4), 2:25	2009-08-29	(United States) Fitzgerald's Casino & Hotel, Tunica, Mississippi	
3	Win	3–0	(United States) Anthony Cannon	TKO	2 (4), 1:46	2009-06-19	(United States) Wicomico Civic Center, Salisbury, Maryland	
2	Win	2–0	(United States) Luis Hodge	RTD	1 (4)	2009-04-03	(United States) Pepsi Pavilion, Memphis, Tennessee	
1	Win	1–0	(United States) Chris Davis	KO	1 (4), 0:28	2009-03-14	(United States) Fitzgerald's Casino & Hotel, Tunica, Mississippi	
