= Álvaro Gaona =

Mexican boxer (born 1985)

Personal information
- Nickname: La Cobra
- Born: Álvaro Gaona Vega; 15 June 1985 (age 41) Reynosa, Tamaulipas, Mexico
- Height: 6 ft 0 in (183 cm)
- Weight: Middleweight

Boxing career
- Reach: 76 in (194 cm)
- Stance: Orthodox

Boxing record
- Total fights: 21
- Wins: 14
- Win by KO: 9
- Losses: 7
- Draws: 0
- No contests: 0

Álvaro Gaona Vega (born 15 June 1985) is a Mexican professional boxer and is the current WBC FECARBOX middleweight champion.

== Professional career ==
On February 6, 2010, Gaona beat Gilberto Flores Hernandez by a 12-round unanimous decision to win the WBC FECARBOX middleweight title. The bout was held in Guadalajara, Mexico.
