= David Benavidez =

American boxer (born 1996)

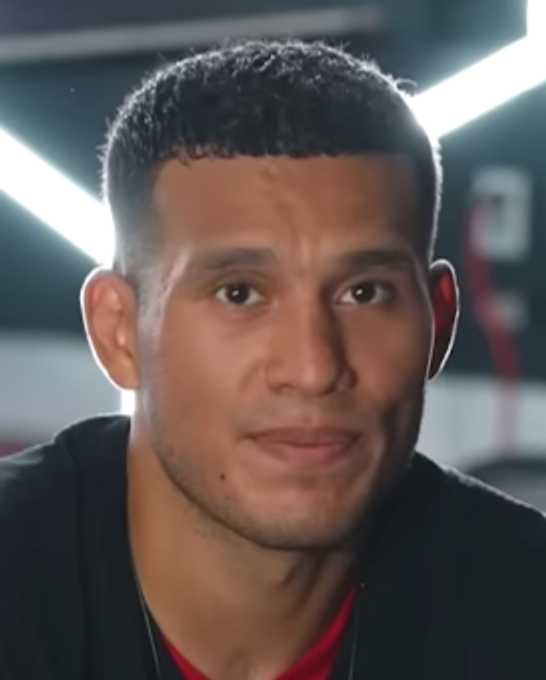
- Benavidez in 2024

Personal information
- Nicknames: El Bandera Roja ("The Red Flag"); The Mexican Monster
- Born: Anthony David Benavidez; December 17, 1996 (age 29) Phoenix, Arizona, U.S.
- Height: 6 ft 1 in (185 cm)
- Weight: Super middleweight; Light heavyweight; Cruiserweight

Boxing career
- Reach: 74 1/2 in (189 cm)
- Stance: Orthodox

Boxing record
- Total fights: 32
- Wins: 32
- Win by KO: 26

Anthony David Benavidez (born December 17, 1996) is an American professional boxer who has held world championships in three weight classes. He has held the unified World Boxing Association (WBA) (Super version) and World Boxing Organization (WBO) cruiserweight titles since May 2026. He previously held the World Boxing Council (WBC) super middleweight title twice between 2017 and 2020, the WBC, and the WBA (Regular version) light heavyweight titles from 2025 to 2026.

Claiming his first world title at 20 years, eight months, three weeks and one day old, Benavidez holds the record as the youngest super middleweight world champion in history.

== Early life ==
Benavidez was born to a Mexican father and an Ecuadorian mother. His older brother, José Benavidez Jr., is also a professional boxer who held the World Boxing Association (WBA) interim welterweight title. Both brothers are trained by their father. As a teenager, Benavidez's weight ballooned to 250 pounds, as he struggled with dieting and discipline.

== Amateur career ==
Benavidez, who started boxing at the age of three, had an amateur record of 15 wins and no losses. He has explained that his amateur career was limited due to him being overweight at age 13 and needing two years to lose the weight.

== Professional career ==
=== Early career ===
Benavidez made his pro debut at the age of 16, defeating Erasmo Moreno by knockout in one round in Puerto Peñasco. Benavidez won the NABF Junior light heavyweight title, his first belt, against Rollin Williams in April 2015. At the end of 2015, Benavidez had a record of 12 wins, with 11 stoppages and no losses. In October 2015, Benavidez signed a promotional deal with Sampson Lewkowicz's Sampson Boxing.

On January 7, 2016, it was announced that Benavidez would start the year against Kevin Cobbs (10–1, 4 KOs) on a Fox Sports 1 edition of PBC Toe-To-Toe Tuesdays on January 18 at Club Nokia in Los Angeles. Prior to the fight, Cobbs was on a 4-fight win streak. Benavidez started the contest quickly and kept Cobbs at a distance. He rocked Cobbs in round 2 on two occasions. After a few clinches, Benavidez hit Cobbs with a flurry of punches, prompting the referee to stop the fight at 1:08 of round 2.

=== Super middleweight ===
Benavidez next fought on April 30 on the undercard of Victor Ortiz vs. Andre Berto II at the StubHub Center in Carson, California. His opponent was Phillip Jackson Benson. Jackson was stopped in round 2 after being hurt many times in the opening round. The fight was scheduled for 8 rounds.

Benavidez would next take part on the undercard of the welterweight world title bout Keith Thurman vs. Shawn Porter, which was rescheduled to take place on June 25 at the Barclays Center in Brooklyn, against Francy Ntetu (16–0, 3 KOs) in an 8-round bout. In an entertaining fight, where both boxers traded, Benavidez won the fight via round 7 TKO. Benavidez seemed to get the better of the trades with Ntetu resorting to clinching by the end of round 2. After 1 minute and 30 seconds of round 7, the crowd booed as referee Shada Murdaugh stopped the fight due to the amount of punishment Ntetu had taken. It was noted that Barry Jordan, a NYSAC doctor, had taken a look at Ntetu and likely would have played a role. Benavidez led 58–56, 58–56 and 59–55 on the judges scorecards at the time of stoppage. Jordon later explained that it was upon his recommendation that the bout be stopped as Ntetu had taken a lot of punishment, mostly to the eye. In July 2015, PBC announced Benavidez would next fight on ESPN against contender Denis Douglin (20–4, 13 KOs) in his first 10-round bout on August 5 at the 2300 Arena in Philadelphia, Pennsylvania. Benavidez was taken to the tenth round but avoided hearing the final bell after stopping Douglin 35 seconds into the round. Benavidez simply broke down Douglin over the course of the fight. The referee stopped the fight as Douglin had taken punishment against the ropes.

Benavidez's first bout of 2017 took place on January 28 on the Carl Frampton vs. Léo Santa Cruz II undercard at the MGM Grand Garden Arena in Paradise, Nevada, against fellow prospect Sherali Mamajonov (14–1, 7 KOs). Benavidez started the fight cautiously before unloading heavy shots that dropped Mamajonov before the end of round 1. At the start of round 2, Benavidez continued to land flash combinations and eventually dropped Mamajanov again. He beat the count, but referee Russell Mora stopped the fight because he appeared to be badly hurt. Benavidez spoke about the win after the fight, "I am a little disappointed because I wanted to give the crowd a spectacular knockout. This is my first time fighting at MGM Grand and I will never forget it. The atmosphere here is amazing. This fight week has been the best experience of my life. I want to continue to fight as much as I can. I want to perfect my craft, train as hard as I can and be the best that I can be."

On March 24, 2017, it was announced that WBC agreed to sanction Benavidez against former world title challenger Rogelio Medina (37–7, 31 KOs) for the #2 mandatory spot on May 20 at the Laredo Energy Arena in Laredo, Texas. Benavidez knocked down Medina three times before the referee waved the fight off in round 8, giving Benavidez the win. Benavidez was considered one of the top prospects at super middleweight.

==== Benavidez vs. Gavril ====
Following his draw against James DeGale, Badou Jack vacated his WBC super middleweight title in order to fight at light heavyweight. The WBC ordered a match between Callum Smith and Anthony Dirrell, with the winner taking the vacant world title. With Smith taking part in WBSS, he was replaced through Benavidez. The bout was scheduled for September 2017. However, on August 5, the WBC announced Dirrell was out due to injury. Instead, Benavidez would face Romanian contender Ronald Gavril (18–1, 14 KOs) on September 8 for the world title at the Hard Rock Hotel & Casino in Nevada. Benavidez defeated Gavril after 12 rounds by split decision. Two judges scored the fight 117–111, 116–111 for Benavidez, whilst the third scored it 116–111 for Gavril. However, Gavril proved to be Benavidez's toughest test so far, with most rounds being closely contested. Benavidez seemed to struggle with conditioning and was knocked down in the final round. Speaking on his record-breaking win, Benavidez said, “It feels amazing to win this title. It’s everything I’ve dreamed about since I was a little kid. It’s everything I’ve dedicated myself to and I’ve worked hard for. It finally paid off.” According to CompuBox stats, Benavidez landed 222 of 863 punches thrown (26%) and Gavril landed 162 of his 817 thrown (20%).

==== Benavidez vs. Gavril II ====
Immediately after the first bout, rematch talks began. Gavril thought he won the first bout and disputed the decision. Benavidez's promoter Sampson Promotions confirmed on October 2, 2017, that negotiations had begun with Mayweather Promotions for a rematch to take place in January 2018. Benavidez stated he wanted to take the rematch to remove all doubt and set the record straight. In December 2017, a deal was close to being finalized for the rematch to take place on the undercard of Danny García vs. Brandon Ríos on Showtime on February 17, 2018. The deal was done a few days later with the bout taking place at the Mandalay Bay Events Center in Paradise, Nevada. In front of 6,240 fans, Benavidez dominated every round, winning via unanimous decision with the scores 120–108, 120–108 and 119–109. ESPN.com scored it a shutout 120-108 for Benavidez. he used different angles a variety of head and body shots throughout the fight leaving no doubt. Before round 11, the ringside doctor took a look at Gavril but allowed him to continue. For every one shot Gavril landed, Benavidez replied with fast combinations. Benavidez reduced the number of shots he threw in the final round, which allowed Gavril to give him some, but little trouble. After the fight, Benavidez said, "I knew he was going to come in aggressive. He's a one trick type of pony. He don't know how to do anything but pressure. I used that to my advantage -- jab, box him all day and when I saw the opening I took it. I didn't knock him out but he's a tough son of a gun." Punch stats showed that Benavidez landed 315 of 942 punches thrown (37%) and Gavril landed 176 of his 757 thrown (23%). For the bout, Benavidez earned $400,000 to Gavril's $125,000 purse. The fight averaged 458,000 viewers and peaked at 489,000 viewers.

=== Positive drug test, suspension, and title dispossession ===
On September 18, 2018, it was reported that Benavidez had tested positive for cocaine from a urine sample collected on August 27 by the Voluntary Anti-Doping Agency (VADA). He was eventually stripped of his title and received a four months-long suspension through February 2019 by the WBC. On December 19, 2018, it was announced that he would be returning to the ring on March 16.

==== Benavidez vs. Love ====
Five and a half months after being stripped of his (WBC) title, Benavidez faced American boxer J'Leon Love on March 16, 2019, at the AT&T Stadium, Arlington, Texas, U.S. and made relatively short work of him by knocking him out in the second round of their scheduled 10-round bout.

==== Benavidez vs. Dirrell ====
According to sources in Mexico back on May 17, 2018, before the Mexican Monster was stripped of his world champion status, a deal was close to being reached for Benavidez to defend his WBC title against Russian boxer Matt Korobov (28–1, 14 KOs) on the Mikey Garcia vs. Robert Easter Jr. lightweight unification under-card on July 28 at the Staples Center in Los Angeles, California. On May 23, Top Rank's Bob Arum revealed he signed Benavidez to his stable and given him a signing bonus of $250,000. Upon the signing, Sampson Lewkowicz filed a lawsuit. According to Lewkowicz, Benavidez signed an extension with his company in November 2017, which extended his contract until 2021. By June 13, the suit was settled and Benavidez returned the signing bonus to Top Rank. On June 21, it was reported a deal had been reached for Benavidez to defend his WBC title against mandatory challenger Anthony Dirrell (32–1–1, 24 KOs). The fight was ordered by the WBC on May 21 and scheduled purse bids were due on June 22. A deal was reached on June 21. The fight was reported to take place on the same card as Shawn Porter vs. Danny García on Showtime on September 8.

The bout between the two combatants would ultimately be pushed back an entire year later, with Benvadiz scoring a win against J'Leon Love and Direll becoming the new WBC super-middleweight title holder by defeating the WBC's then-ranked #2 super-middleweight contender Avni Yıldırım. And finally on Sep 28, 2019, at the Staples Center, Los Angeles, California, U.S., Benavidez and Direll found themselves at opposite ends of the ring.

And after 9 round of Benavidez pressuring, bloodying, and battering his opposition, Direll's corner threw in the towel. Thus granting Benavidez his 22nd victory and once again ownership of the WBC super-middleweight title.

Benavidez vs. Angulo

On August 15, 2020, Benavidez fought Roamer Alexis Angulo. Benavidez weighed in over the super middleweight limit during the weigh in, and was stripped of his title yet again. Benavidez dominated Angulo in a one-sided bout, which culminated in a tenth-round stoppage, after Benavidez unloaded a barrage of shots on Angulo.

==== Benavidez vs. Ellis ====
On March 13, 2021, Benavidez fought Ronald Ellis. Ellis was ranked #8 by the WBC at super middleweight. Benavidez stopped Ellis in the eleventh round via technical knockout.

==== Benavidez vs. Davis ====
On July 14, 2021, Showtime announced that Benavidez was scheduled for an August 28 bout against former titlist José Uzcátegui at the Phoenix Suns Arena. However, on October 28, Uzcátegui was pulled from the fight due to failing a drug test, and was replaced by Kyrone Davis who he would go on to defeat by way of technical knock out in the 7th round of their scheduled 10-round bout.

==== Benavidez vs. Lemieux ====
Benavidez faced former IBF middleweight champion David Lemieux on May 21, 2022, for the vacant WBC interim super middleweight title. Benavidez dominated the fight, dropping Lemieux hard in round 2 and scoring a stoppage in round 3 after a brutal assault.

==== Benavidez vs. Plant ====
On January 25, 2023, it was announced that Benavidez would be making the first defense of his WBC interim super middleweight title against former IBF world champion, Caleb Plant. The fight took place on Showtime PPV on March 25 at the MGM Grand Garden Arena in Las Vegas. On the night, Benavidez started slow, before relentlessly pressuring Plant in the second half of the fight with power punches to break down his opponent and win a unanimous decision, with judges' scorecards of 117–111, 116–112 and 115–113. Despite the pre-fight animosity between the two fighters, Benavidez gave credit to Plant, stating in his post-fight interview: "I wanna shout out Caleb Plant. I know there was a lot said between us, but in the end we settled this like men. He’s a helluva fighter." The victory meant that Benavidez retained his undefeated record and his position as the WBC's mandatory challenger for the undisputed super middleweight champion, Canelo Álvarez. He expressed his desire to face Álvarez in the post-fight press conference.

==== Benavidez vs. Andrade ====
According to ESPN's Mike Coppinger in August 2023, a deal between Benavidez and former two-weight world champion Demetrius Andrade (32–0, 19 KOs) was being finalised with a target date before the end of the year. Andrade had struggled to get a big name in the ring and Benavidez was considered as the bogeyman of the 168 weight division. Benavidez had beaten Caleb Plant in March 2023, a career-best win. On October 1, the fight and card was confirmed to take place on Showtime PPV, on November 25 at the Frost Bank Center in San Antonio, Texas. There was an interesting stat heading into the contest for Andrade, as Benavidez would mark the first time Andrade would ever compete against a former world champion in his 15-year professional career. At this stage, none of his previous opponents had ever gone on to win a world title. It was also Andrade's first PPV headline fight. The event was yet to be formally announced and a week later the handlers moved the event to take place in Las Vegas at the Michelob ULTRA Arena, before officially announcing the card on October 12. This would be Andrade's second time fighting in Las Vegas, last being November 2011.

Speaking at the press conference, Andrade said, “I’m having a great training camp and I can’t wait for November 25. I expect myself and David Benavidez to bring our best on fight night and give the fans a memorable matchup. I have the tools and ability to beat anybody, and I’ll win this fight because of the confidence I have in my skills.” Benavidez was expecting no less than a stoppage win for himself. The fight was contested for Benavidez's interim WBC super middleweight title. Andrade was confident he could find multiple ways to win by relying on his ability and movement. He hoped a win here would propel him on to even bigger fights and domination of the super middleweight division. Benavidez weighed in at 167 pounds, whilst Andrade was a little heavier at 167.6 pounds.

Before the fight, it was reported by ESPN Andrade had rehydrated to 190 pounds since the weigh in. Benavidez handed Andrade his first professional career defeat, stopping him by corner retirement after the sixth round. Andrade started the fight quick, winning the first few rounds. The tide changed in the fourth round however: Andrade was in his rhythm, boxing well until Benavidez connected with a hard right hand, dropping Andrade to the floor. Andrade beat the count, but was hit with a huge left hook followed by combinations. Instead of attempting to slow down the pace of the fight in round five, Andrade showed his toughness in trying to trade blows with Benavidez. Andrade again started the sixth round confidently, landing his own combinations and an uppercut, which pushed Benavidez back briefly. However, Benavidez continued to land hard shots. Andrade finished the round with blood pouring from his mouth. His corner then waived off the fight. At the time of stoppage, the three judges scorecards read 59–54, 58-55 & 57–56 in favour of Benavidez.

During the post-fight interviews, Benavidez was greeted by former heavyweight champion Mike Tyson and he called out for a super fight against Álvarez. Andrade congratulated him, “I thought overall I did everything I needed to do to get the bigger man off me. David’s definitely a hell of a fighter. Nobody was even willing to get in the ring with him. I tried to become a three-division world champion. That’s not far-fetched. David was the man tonight. Congratulations to him and his family. We move on, and we’re gonna keep pushing.” Benavidez thought Andrade would be tougher opponent, which was said with no disrespect. According to Compubox, Benavidez landed 117 of 336 punches thrown (35%), 78 of them which came in round 5 and 6 alone, and Andrade landed 68 of his 259 thrown (26%). It was reported that Andrade would have a base purse of $1.5 million. According to Rick Glaser, the fight did less than 60,000 PPV buys, generating below $5 million in revenue.

=== Light heavyweight ===
==== Benavidez vs. Gvozdyk ====
Following his win over Andrade, Benavidez moved up to light heavyweight to face Oleksandr Gvozdyk for the interim WBC belt at MGM Grand Garden Arena in Las Vegas on June 15, 2024. Despite entering the bout with a torn tendon in his right hand, Benavidez won via unanimous decision, with scores of 119–109, 117–111, and 116-112 all for Benavidez. He out-landed Gvozdyk 223 punches to 163 according to CompuBox.

==== Benavidez vs. Morrell ====
On October 8, 2024, it was announced that Benavidez would face David Morrell, who at that time held WBA (Regular) light heavyweight title.

On February 1, 2024, the two met at the T-Mobile Arena in Nevada, engaging in a highly competitive fight that saw both fighters throwing at a high volume. While Benavidez controlled most of the fight, Morrell scored a flash knockdown over Benavidez towards the end of the 11th, the second of Benavidez's career. However, following a furious exchange at the end of the round, Morrell threw a shot after the bell that connected on Benavidez, which prompted Thomas Taylor to deduct a point from Morrell. After a similarly high-paced 12th round, Benavidez won via a unanimous decision, with scores of 118–108 and 115–111 twice. CompuBox stats revealed that Benavidez landed 224 out of 553 punches, connecting at 40.5%, while Morrell landed 165 out of 601 with a connect percentage of 27.5%. With this win, Benavidez improved to 30–0, retaining his WBC interim light heavyweight belt and picking up the WBA (Regular) light heavyweight belt.

On March 7, 2025, following his win over Beterbiev, the WBC formally ordered Dmitry Bivol (24–1,12 KOs) to make a mandatory defence against Benavidez. Both teams had until April 8 to negotiate a deal. Turki Alalshikh stated he was “no longer interested” in the bout and intended to put on a trilogy between Bivol and Beterbiev. This suggested that Riyadh Season would not be involved in the negotiations. There were rumours a deal was close to being agreed until Sampson Lewkowicz squashed them. He stated he had sent a large offer to Bivol's team and was yet to hear back. On April 7, Bivol informed the WBC of his decision to relinquish the title, in order to move forward with a trilogy bout with Beterbiev. With this, Benavidez was upgraded to full titleholder. Two weeks later, the WBA presented Benavidez with their regular world title.

==== Benavidez vs. Yarde ====
In June 2025, Eddie Hearn revealed he had received an offer from PBC for Benavidez to defend his world title against British boxer Callum Smith (31–2, 22 KOs). The aim was for the fight to take place in October, most likely in Las Vegas. Sampson Lewkowicz said the fight could end up taking place in Liverpool, England, with another possibility being Dallas, Texas. Lewkowicz also mentioned Anthony Yarde as a potential opponent in the UK. In July, Turki Alalshikh posted on X, announcing Benavidez would be defending his world title against Yarde (27‑3, 24 KOs) in November 2025. On July 7, the fight was announced under 'Ring IV' card, to headlining a quadruple-header on November 22, 2025, at ANB Arena in Riyadh, Saudi Arabia. The fight was Benavidez's first outside of North America. He adjusted his sleep schedule to accommodate the time difference. He indicated that the weight cut was the easiest he had experienced in his career. Although he had not achieved any stoppage wins at light heavyweight, he believed he had the capability to knock out Yarde. He also observed that Yarde's activity tends to decrease in previous fights. He mentioned that he would concentrate more on footwork, distance, and head movement instead of solely depending on power. Both weighed within the limit, with Benavides coming in at 174.3 pounds, and Yarde, slightly lighter at 173.9 pounds.

Benavidez dominated Yarde throughout, securing a seventh-round TKO to retain his WBC light heavyweight title. From the first round, Benavidez set the pace, utilizing his quick hands and combination punching to keep Yarde on the defensive. Yarde found himself consistently pressured against the ropes, which limited his offensive capabilities. Although he had brief moments of success, Yarde was progressively worn down by Benavidez's continuous onslaught. In the seventh round, with Yarde bleeding profusely from the nose, Benavidez delivered a powerful series of punches in the corner, knocking Yarde down with a left hook. Two points were deducted for hitting Yarde while he was down, but referee Hector Afu ultimately halted the fight at 1:59 of the round, awarding a TKO win to Benavidez. This marked Benavidez's first stoppage in the light heavyweight division. After the fight, Benavidez said, "It's definitely what I expected," speaking on aggressive action throughout, followed by, "He stepped into Monster's world, and he got KO'd." At the time of the stoppage, he was leading on all three judges' scorecards. Benavidez was later honored with the World Boxing Council's Performance of the Year award for his efforts.

=== Cruiserweight ===
==== Benavidez vs. Ramírez ====
After defeating Yarde, Benavidez announced during his post fight ring interview that he would be moving up to challenge cruiserweight champion Gilberto Ramírez (48–1, 30 KOs) on Cinco de Mayo weekend in 2026. Ramírez was on 4-fight win streak since dropping a decision to Dmitry Bivol, and was the unified WBA and WBO champion. On January 13, 2026, ESPN reported that the fight would take place in Las Vegas on May 2. The fight would see Benavidez moving up in weight and attempting to become a three-weight world champion. In March, the fight was facing sanctioning conflicts. The WBA and WBO had been in discussions to possibly withdraw their sanctioning of the bout due to the WBC's unexpected involvement. The WBC reached out to both boxers for a ceremony unveiling a special “Tollan Tlatequi” belt for the winner. They were known for awarding the winner of the Cinco De Mayo fight every year; however, this time, it caused tension with the other organizations involved. The WBO and WBA wanted to maintain control of the championship recognition. Gustavo Olivieri (WBO) and Gilberto Mendoza (WBA) planned to send letters to the key promoters of the event to advise them that if the special belt was contested, they would not recognize the fight's winner with their belts. A few days later, the WBA confirmed it would sanction the fight despite the controversy. During fight week, all matters were resolved in regards to the world titles being on the line, by the sanctioning bodies involved. Ahead of the fight, Ramírez's trainer, Malik Scott, believed his fighter was being underrated and overlooked by boxing fans and experts. He criticized the boxing community, stating that Ramírez was going to be Benavidez's toughest opponent to date. Heading into the fight, Benavidez was listed as a 4–1 favorite, with DraftKings. Benavidez weighed in at 196.8 pounds, while Ramirez weighed exactly on the cruiserweight limit at 200 pounds. Benavidez would go on to win the fight via KO in the sixth-round to win the WBA and WBO cruiserweight titles. He became not only a three-division champion but the first boxer ever to win titles at super middleweight, light heavyweight and cruiserweight.

In June 2026, the WBC ordered Noel Mikaelian (28–3, 12 KOs) to defend his title against Benavidez in a three-belt unification. WBC president Mauricio Sulaimán publicly stated that Mikaelian could be stripped if he chose not to take the fight. On July 28, it was reported that Sampson Lewkowicz had sent contracts to Don King to make the fight. On August 4, Mikaelian announced that he had signed with Zuffa Boxing and would next challenge Jai Opetaia for his title on the Ryan Garcia vs. Conor Benn undercard scheduled for September 12 in Las Vegas. It was stated that taking the fight could likely cost Mikaelian his WBC title and may also expose him to legal action from promoter Don King. According to Dan Rafael, Don King and Benavidez's promoter, Sampson Lewkowicz, had already reached an agreement for a Mikaelian-Benavidez fight. Mikaelian's team disputed claims that a genuine offer for the Benavidez fight was ever formally presented. Opetaia criticised Benavidez, saying, "Credit to Noel for stepping up to the plate while others, yes, David Benavidez, I'm talking about you, continue to run and hide." Despite the controversy, Mikaelian stated that he intended to "defend my world championship" and described the contest as "the fight I've wanted since becoming a two-time world champion".

==== Benavidez vs. Cieślak ====
On August 18, 2026, it was reported that Benavidez would make a return to the ring on December 12 in Phoenix against veteran boxer Michał Cieślak (28–2, 22 KOs), the interim WBC cruiserweight champion. Cieślak was described as a 'solid operator' and on a seven-fight winning streak. His only losses came to former world champions Ilunga Makabu and Lawrence Okolie, in world title fights. On September 14, the WBC stripped Mikaelian ahead of his scheduled bout with Opetaia, which elevated Cieślak to full championship status. The WBC also ordered Cieślak to defend the title against Benavidez. In October, Benavidez revealed the fight against Cieślak would be his last with current manager Sampson Lewkowicz, having being signed with him for the majority of his professional career. He stated that he would continue working with PBC and Al Haymon, as co-promotion with his own company, DB Promotions. On October 22, the three-belt unification fight between Benavidez and Cieślak was announced to take place the Desert Diamond Arena in Glendale, Arizona, on December 5, 2026. Benavidez said whilst he respected Cieślak, for coming off a win over veteran Jean Pascal, he was looking for a statement win. Cieślak had not fought since beating Pascal in June 2025.

== Professional boxing record ==
32 fights	32 wins	0 losses
By knockout	26	0
By decision	6	0

No.	Result	Record	Opponent	Type	Round, time	Date	Location	Notes
32	Win	32–0	Gilberto Ramírez	KO	6 (12), 2:59	May 2, 2026	T-Mobile Arena, Paradise, Nevada, U.S.	Won WBA (Super) and WBO cruiserweight titles
31	Win	31–0	Anthony Yarde	TKO	7 (12), 1:59	Nov 22, 2025	anb Arena, Riyadh, Saudi Arabia	Retained WBA (Regular) and WBC light heavyweight titles
30	Win	30–0	David Morrell	UD	12	Feb 1, 2025	T-Mobile Arena, Paradise, Nevada, U.S.	Retained WBC interim light heavyweight title; Won WBA (Regular) light heavyweight title
29	Win	29–0	Oleksandr Gvozdyk	UD	12	Jun 15, 2024	MGM Grand Garden Arena, Paradise, Nevada, U.S.	Won vacant WBC interim light heavyweight title
28	Win	28–0	Demetrius Andrade	RTD	6 (12), 3:00	Nov 25, 2023	Michelob Ultra Arena, Paradise, Nevada, U.S.	Retained WBC interim super middleweight title
27	Win	27–0	Caleb Plant	UD	12	Mar 25, 2023	MGM Grand Garden Arena, Paradise, Nevada, U.S.	Retained WBC interim super middleweight title
26	Win	26–0	David Lemieux	TKO	3 (12), 1:31	May 21, 2022	Gila River Arena, Glendale, Arizona, U.S.	Won vacant WBC interim super middleweight title
25	Win	25–0	Kyrone Davis	TKO	7 (10), 0:48	Nov 13, 2021	Footprint Center, Phoenix, Arizona, U.S.	
24	Win	24–0	Ronald Ellis	TKO	11 (12), 2:03	Mar 13, 2021	Mohegan Sun Arena, Montville, Connecticut, U.S.	
23	Win	23–0	Roamer Alexis Angulo	RTD	10 (12), 3:00	Aug 15, 2020	Mohegan Sun Arena, Montville, Connecticut, U.S.	
22	Win	22–0	Anthony Dirrell	TKO	9 (12), 1:39	Sep 28, 2019	Staples Center, Los Angeles, California, U.S.	Won WBC super middleweight title
21	Win	21–0	J'Leon Love	TKO	2 (10), 1:14	Mar 16, 2019	AT&T Stadium, Arlington, Texas, U.S.	
20	Win	20–0	Ronald Gavril	UD	12	Feb 17, 2018	Mandalay Bay Events Center, Paradise, Nevada, U.S.	Retained WBC super middleweight title
19	Win	19–0	Ronald Gavril	SD	12	Sep 8, 2017	Hard Rock Hotel & Casino, Paradise, Nevada, U.S.	Won vacant WBC super middleweight title
18	Win	18–0	Rogelio Medina	TKO	8 (12), 1:01	May 20, 2017	Energy Arena, Laredo, Texas, U.S.	
17	Win	17–0	Sherali Mamajonov	KO	2 (8), 1:04	Jan 28, 2017	MGM Grand Garden Arena, Paradise, Nevada, U.S.	
16	Win	16–0	Denis Douglin	TKO	10 (10), 0:35	Aug 5, 2016	2300 Arena, Philadelphia, Pennsylvania, U.S.	
15	Win	15–0	Francy Ntetu	TKO	7 (8), 1:30	Jun 25, 2016	Barclays Center, New York City, New York, U.S.	
14	Win	14–0	Phillip Jackson Benson	KO	2 (8), 2:07	Apr 30, 2016	StubHub Center, Carson, California, U.S.	
13	Win	13–0	Kevin Cobbs	TKO	2 (8), 1:08	Jan 19, 2016	Club Nokia, Los Angeles, California, U.S.	
12	Win	12–0	Felipe Romero	TKO	1 (8), 2:00	Nov 14, 2015	Hard Rock Hotel & Casino, Paradise, Nevada, U.S.	
11	Win	11–0	Alberto Gutiérrez	TKO	1 (6), 0:55	Sep 5, 2015	CUM Aguaprieta, Agua Prieta, Mexico	
10	Win	10–0	Ricardo Campillo	TKO	2 (6), 1:21	May 15, 2015	US Airways Centre, Phoenix, Arizona, U.S.	
9	Win	9–0	Rollin Williams	TKO	1 (8), 2:59	Apr 25, 2015	Celebrity Theater, Phoenix, Arizona, U.S.	Won vacant NABF Junior light heavyweight title
8	Win	8–0	Azamat Umarzoda	UD	6	Dec 20, 2014	Celebrity Theatre, Phoenix, Arizona, U.S.	
7	Win	7–0	Juan Hernández	TKO	1 (4), 1:36	Oct 11, 2014	Gimnasio Municipal de box, Nogales, Mexico	
6	Win	6–0	Jairo Dolores	TKO	1 (4), 1:54	Aug 23, 2014	Campos Deportivos de la Casa Social Cerveceria, Tecate, Mexico	
5	Win	5–0	Erick Revueltas	KO	4 (4), 0:40	May 24, 2014	Auditorio Municipal, Tijuana, Mexico	
4	Win	4–0	Arturo Martínez	TKO	1 (4), 2:12	Apr 11, 2014	Hipódromo Caliente, Arena Tecate, Tijuana, Mexico	
3	Win	3–0	Omar Aispuro	TKO	1 (4), 1:15	Jan 31, 2014	Caliente Racetrack, Tijuana, Mexico	
2	Win	2–0	Édgar Gálvan	KO	1 (4), 2:02	Dec 4, 2013	Salón Las Pulgas, Tijuana, Mexico	
1	Win	1–0	Erasmo Mendoza	KO	1 (4)	Aug 17, 2013	El Chamizal, Puerto Peñasco, Mexico	

== Titles in boxing ==
=== Major world titles ===
- WBC super middleweight champion (168 lbs) (2×)
- WBC light heavyweight champion (175 lbs)
- WBA (Super) cruiserweight champion (200 lbs)
- WBO cruiserweight champion (200 lbs)

=== Secondary major world titles (Note: The secondary champion lineage lists the Regular or Unified champions while the primary champion is occupied.) ===
- WBA (Regular) light heavyweight champion (Note: Has been secondary champion since February 1, 2025.) (175 lbs)

=== Interim world titles ===
- WBC interim super middleweight champion (168 lbs)
- WBC interim light heavyweight champion (175 lbs)

=== Regional/International titles ===
- NABF Junior light heavyweight champion (175 lbs)

=== Honorary titles ===
- WBC super middleweight champion in recess

== See also ==
- List of male boxers
- Notable boxing families
- List of Mexican boxing world champions
- List of world super-middleweight boxing champions
- List of world light-heavyweight boxing champions
- List of world cruiserweight boxing champions
- List of boxing triple champions

== Notes and references ==
=== References ===
Sporting positions
Regional boxing titles
New title	NABF Junior light heavyweight champion April 25, 2015 – January 2016	Vacant Title next held by Ali Akhmedov
World boxing titles
Vacant Title last held by Badou Jack	WBC super middleweight champion September 8, 2017 – October 3, 2018; Status changed	Vacant Title next held by Anthony Dirrell
Preceded by Anthony Dirrell	WBC super middleweight champion September 28, 2019 – August 14, 2020; Stripped	Vacant Title next held by Canelo Álvarez
Vacant Title last held by Danny Green	WBC super middleweight champion Interim title May 21, 2022 – July 24, 2024; Vacated	Vacant Title next held by Christian M'billi
Vacant Title next held by Oleksandr Gvozdyk	WBC light heavyweight champion Interim title June 15, 2024 – April 7, 2025; Promoted	Vacant
Preceded by David Morrell	WBA light heavyweight champion Regular title February 1, 2025 – October 1, 2026; Vacated	Vacant
Preceded by Dmitry Bivol	WBC light heavyweight champion April 7, 2025 – October 9, 2026; Vacated	Vacant Title next held by Willy Hutchinson
Preceded by Gilberto Ramírez	WBA cruiserweight champion Super title May 2, 2026 – present	Incumbent
Preceded by Gilberto Ramírez	WBO cruiserweight champion May 2, 2026 – present	Incumbent
Honorary boxing titles
Vacant Title last held by Andre Ward	WBC super middleweight champion In recess October 3, 2018 – September 28, 2019; Regains title	Vacant
Records
Preceded by Darrin Van Horn; Age 22	Youngest super middleweight champion Age 20; September 8, 2017 – present	Incumbent
