= Uzcátegui =

Uzcátegui (Spanish pronunciation: usˈkateɣi) is a Basque surname. Notable people with the surname include:

- Aymet Uzcátegui (born 1995), Venezuelan tennis player
- José Uzcátegui (born 1990), Venezuelan boxer
- Giorgina Uzcátegui, (born 1996), Venezuelan businesswoman and entrepreneur
