= Anthony Dirrell =

American boxer

Personal information
- Nickname: The Dog
- Born: October 14, 1984 (age 41) Flint, Michigan, U.S.
- Height: 6 ft 1 1/2 in (187 cm)
- Weight: Super middleweight

Boxing career
- Reach: 74 1/2 in (189 cm)
- Stance: Orthodox

Boxing record
- Total fights: 39
- Wins: 34
- Win by KO: 25
- Losses: 3
- Draws: 2

Anthony Dirrell (born October 14, 1984) is an American former professional boxer. He was a two-time WBC super middleweight champion, having held the title in 2019 and previously from 2014 to 2015. He is the younger brother of 2004 Olympic bronze medalist Andre Dirrell, who is also a professional boxer.

== Professional career ==
Anthony Dirrell made his pro debut on January 27, 2005 against Henry Dukes. Dirrell stopped him in the first round. Dirrell had his next fight on February 11, 2005 against Dewayne Warren. Dirrell knocked Warren down twice in round one and twice again in round two. Dirrell won by TKO.

Dirrell had his third fight against Larry Brothers in which Dirrell won by TKO in the second round. Dirrell had his fourth fight against Mike Walthier knocking him out in the first round.

Dirrell had his fifth fight against Gabriel Rivera on August 13, 2005. Though Rivera was unbeaten in four fights, Dirrell won by TKO in the second. Dirrell had his sixth fight against Kevin Butts in which Dirrell knocked him out in the first round.

Dirrell had his seventh fight against Chris Grays in which Dirrell won by TKO in the first round. Dirrell had his eighth fight against Juan Carlos Ramos in which Dirrell won by TKO in the first round.

Dirrell had his ninth fight against James Morrow on June 23, 2006 in which Dirrell won by TKO in the first round. Dirrell won this fight in impressive fashion as he first knocked down Morrow with a huge right hand to the head, then followed up with a flurry in which Dirrell hit Morrow with a perfect left hook to the body which blew Morrow's mouthpiece out. Dirrell's tenth fight was against Billy Thompson in which he won by unanimous decision in 6 rounds.

On April 24, 2015 Anthony Dirrell debuted with Premier Boxing Champions vs. Badou Jack at the UIC Pavilion in Chicago, IL.

=== Dirrell vs. Bika ===
Following a 23 fight win streak, Dirrell earned the opportunity to become the mandatory challenger for the WBC Super Middleweight title. He recorded his 24th consecutive victory with a win over Renan St-Juste, when his opponent could not continue due to a shoulder injury. After another pair of wins, on December 12, 2013, Dirrell faced champion Sakio Bika at the Barclays Center in Brooklyn, New York for the title. After 12 rounds, the judges ruled the fight a draw.

On August 16, 2014, at the StubHub Center in Carson, California, Dirrell faced Bika in a championship rematch. After another 12 rounds, the judges awarded the fight and the title to Dirrell by unanimous decision.

=== Dirrell vs. Jack ===
Dirrell's next fight was on April 24, 2015 against Badou Jack at the UIC Pavilion in Chicago. Challenger Jack handed Dirrell his first full-fledged loss with a majority decision that saw the 31-year-old Swede control the fight through the middle rounds, relying on a strong jab and a confident aggression to outpoint Dirrell and win a majority decision victory.

=== WBC contention, injury ===
After Badou Jack vacated the WBC super middleweight title, WBC president Mauricio Sulaiman ordered Dirrell to face Callum Smith for the vacant belt. Following Smith's entry into the World Boxing Super Series, it was announced the fight for the vacant title would be between Dirrell and David Benavidez. On August 5, the WBC announced that Dirrell would be unable to compete due to injury and the bout for the vacant world title would be between Benavidez and Ronald Gavril.

=== Dirrell vs. Yıldırım ===
On February 23, 2019, Dirrell fought WBC's #2 Avni Yıldırım for the vacant WBC super middleweight title. Dirrell fought well but had a hard time dealing with Yıldırım at times. The fight was scheduled for twelve rounds, but the ringside physician made the recommendation to stop the fight, since Dirrell was dealing with a cut over his left eye, caused by an accidental head clash in the seventh round. Dirrell was leading on two of the scorecards at the time of stoppage, 96-94 and 96-94, while the third judge had it 98-92 for Yıldırım, which was enough for a technical split decision win for Dirrell.

=== Dirrell vs. Benavidez ===
In his first title defence, Dirrell faced David Benavidez. Benavidez, a former holder of the same belt, was undefeated and had never lost the belt in the ring. In a very competitive fight, Dirrell was fighting well in the opening four rounds. However, things started to go south for Dirrell in the fifth round, when he sustained a bad cut from a Benavidez jab. In the ninth round, after Benavidez unloaded a barrage of shots at Dirrell, Dirrell's corner decided to stop the fight.

=== Dirrell vs. Davis ===
In his next fight, Dirrell fought Kyrone Davis in an eliminator for the WBC super middleweight championship. The fight ended in a split-decision draw, both fighters winning on one scorecard apiece, 115-113, while the third judge had the fight a draw, 114-114.

== Outside the ring ==
It was announced by HBO Boxing After Dark announcer Larry Merchant on the June 16, 2007 telecast that Dirrell was currently undergoing chemotherapy for non-Hodgkin's lymphoma. He was cleared to box again after completing chemotherapy in 2008.

On January 28, 2008, Dirrell was held overnight in the Flint city lockup on suspicion of armed robbery. However, no charges were ever filed. Dirrell's grandfather claims that Dirrell was on his way to undergo chemotherapy for non-Hodgkin's lymphoma when the robbery took place.

== Professional boxing record ==
| 39 fights | 34 wins | 3 losses |
|---|---|---|
| By knockout | 25 | 2 |
| By decision | 9 | 1 |
| Draws | 2 | |

| No. | Result | Record | Opponent | Type | Round, time | Date | Location | Notes |
|---|---|---|---|---|---|---|---|---|
| 39 | Loss | 34–3–2 | Caleb Plant | KO | 9 (12), 2:57 | Oct 15, 2022 | Barclays Center, New York City, New York, U.S. | |
| 38 | Win | 34–2–2 | Marcos Hernandez | KO | 4 (10), 0:56 | Nov 6, 2021 | MGM Grand Garden Arena, Paradise, Nevada, U.S. | |
| 37 | Draw | 33–2–2 | Kyrone Davis | SD | 12 | Feb 27, 2021 | Shrine Exposition Center, Los Angeles, California, U.S. | |
| 36 | Loss | 33–2–1 | David Benavidez | TKO | 9 (12), 1:39 | Sep 28, 2019 | Staples Center, Los Angeles, California, US | Lost WBC super middleweight title |
| 35 | Win | 33–1–1 | Avni Yıldırım | TD | 10 (12), 1:55 | Feb 23, 2019 | Minneapolis Armory, Minneapolis, Minnesota, U.S. | Won vacant WBC super middleweight title; Split TD after Dirrell cut from accidental head clash |
| 34 | Win | 32–1–1 | Abraham Han | UD | 10 | Apr 28, 2018 | Don Haskins Center, El Paso, Texas, U.S. | |
| 33 | Win | 31–1–1 | Denis Douglin | TD | 6 (10), 1:58 | Nov 17, 2017 | Dort Federal Credit Union Event Center, Flint, Michigan, U.S. | Unanimous TD after Dirrell cut from accidental head clash |
| 32 | Win | 30–1–1 | Norbert Nemesapati | RTD | 6 (10), 3:00 | Jan 13, 2017 | Park Race Track, Hialeah, Florida, U.S. | |
| 31 | Win | 29–1–1 | Caleb Truax | TKO | 1 (10), 1:49 | Apr 29, 2016 | Etess Arena, Atlantic City, New Jersey, U.S. | |
| 30 | Win | 28–1–1 | Marco Antonio Rubio | UD | 10 | Sep 6, 2015 | American Bank Center, Corpus Christi, Texas, U.S. | |
| 29 | Loss | 27–1–1 | Badou Jack | MD | 12 | Apr 24, 2015 | UIC Pavilion, Chicago, Illinois, U.S. | Lost WBC super middleweight title |
| 28 | Win | 27–0–1 | Sakio Bika | UD | 12 | Aug 16, 2014 | StubHub Center, Carson, California, U.S. | Won WBC super middleweight title |
| 27 | Draw | 26–0–1 | Sakio Bika | SD | 12 | Dec 7, 2013 | Barclays Center, New York City, New York, U.S. | For WBC super middleweight title |
| 26 | Win | 26–0 | Anthony Hanshaw | TKO | 3 (10), 2:36 | Jul 27, 2013 | AT&T Center, San Antonio, Texas, U.S. | |
| 25 | Win | 25–0 | Don Mouton | UD | 8 | May 3, 2013 | The Cosmopolitan of Las Vegas, Paradise, Nevada, U.S. | |
| 24 | Win | 24–0 | Renan St-Juste | TKO | 4 (12), 2:54 | Dec 2, 2011 | Chumash Casino Resort, Santa Ynez, California, U.S. | |
| 23 | Win | 23–0 | Kevin Engel | KO | 2 (10), 1:44 | Jul 22, 2011 | Morongo Casino Resort & Spa, Cabazon, California, U.S. | |
| 22 | Win | 22–0 | Dante Craig | KO | 5 (10), 1:50 | Jul 2, 2011 | Atwood Stadium, Flint, Michigan, U.S. | Won vacant UBO InterContinental super middleweight title |
| 21 | Win | 21–0 | Alberto Mercedes | TKO | 3 (8), 2:48 | May 13, 2011 | Chumash Casino Resort, Santa Ynez, California, U.S. | |
| 20 | Win | 20–0 | Daryl Salmon | TKO | 3 (8), 2:34 | Oct 15, 2010 | Buffalo Run Casino, Miami, Oklahoma, U.S. | |
| 19 | Win | 19–0 | Jimmy Campbell | KO | 1 (6), 2:06 | Sep 17, 2010 | Star of the Desert Arena, Primm, Nevada, U.S. | |
| 18 | Win | 18–0 | Alfredo Contreras | TKO | 7 (8), 2:32 | Aug 7, 2009 | Star of the Desert Arena, Primm, Nevada, U.S. | |
| 17 | Win | 17–0 | Alexander Pacheco Quiroz | TKO | 1 (6), 0:51 | May 1, 2009 | Chumash Casino Resort, Santa Ynez, California, U.S. | |
| 16 | Win | 16–0 | Dominique Azeez | KO | 1 (4), 2:59 | Mar 28, 2009 | Buffalo Run Casino, Miami, Oklahoma, U.S. | |
| 15 | Win | 15–0 | Jose Medina | UD | 4 | Feb 14, 2009 | BankAtlantic Center, Sunrise, Florida, U.S. | |
| 14 | Win | 14–0 | Robert Kliewer | TKO | 2, 1:03 | Dec 5, 2008 | Chumash Casino Resort, Santa Ynez, California, U.S. | |
| 13 | Win | 13–0 | Andy Mavros | UD | 4 | Oct 11, 2008 | Pearl Concert Theater, Paradise, Nevada, U.S. | |
| 12 | Win | 12–0 | James Hopkins | TKO | 1 (8), 1:12 | Dec 22, 2006 | Perani Arena and Event Center, Flint, Michigan, U.S. | |
| 11 | Win | 11–0 | James North | TKO | 4 (6), 1:18 | Nov 17, 2006 | Soboba Casino, San Jacinto, California, U.S. | |
| 10 | Win | 10–0 | Billy Thompson | UD | 6 | Sep 2, 2006 | Staples Center, Los Angeles, California, U.S. | |
| 9 | Win | 9–0 | James Morrow | TKO | 1 (6), 1:37 | Jun 23, 2006 | Oracle Arena, Oakland, California, U.S. | |
| 8 | Win | 8–0 | Juan Carlos Ramos | TKO | 1 (6), 2:54 | May 25, 2006 | Pechanga Resort & Casino, Temecula, California, U.S. | |
| 7 | Win | 7–0 | Chris Grays | TKO | 1, 2:59 | Dec 17, 2005 | The Palace, Auburn Hills, Michigan, U.S. | |
| 6 | Win | 6–0 | Yameen I Muhammad | KO | 1 (6), 0:22 | Nov 4, 2005 | The Palace, Auburn Hills, Michigan, U.S. | |
| 5 | Win | 5–0 | Gabriel Rivera | TKO | 2 (6), 2:53 | Aug 12, 2005 | The Palace, Auburn Hills, Michigan, U.S. | |
| 4 | Win | 4–0 | Mike Walthier | KO | 1 (6), 1:43 | Apr 29, 2005 | The Palace, Auburn Hills, Michigan, U.S. | |
| 3 | Win | 3–0 | Larry Brothers | TKO | 2 (4), 1:14 | Mar 10, 2005 | Michael's Eighth Avenue, Glen Burnie, Maryland, U.S. | |
| 2 | Win | 2–0 | Dewayne Warren | TKO | 2 (4), 1:30 | Feb 11, 2005 | Philips Arena, Atlanta, Georgia, U.S. | |
| 1 | Win | 1–0 | Henry Dukes | TKO | 1 (4), 1:20 | Jan 27, 2005 | Michael's Eighth Avenue, Glen Burnie, Maryland, U.S. | |

Sporting positions
Minor world boxing titles
| Vacant Title last held by Joseph Kwadjo | UBO InterContinental super middleweight champion July 2, 2011 – October 2014; Vacated | Vacant Title next held by Varazdat Chernikov |
Major world boxing titles
| Preceded by Sakio Bika | WBC super middleweight champion August 16, 2014 – April 24, 2015 | Succeeded by Badou Jack |
| Vacant Title last held by David Benavidez stripped | WBC super middleweight champion February 23 – September 28, 2019 | Succeeded by David Benavidez |
