= Michel Rosales =

Mexican boxer

Personal information
- Nickname: El Bravo ("The Brave")
- Born: Michel Rosales Hernandez; 24 February 1983 (age 43) San Luis Potosí, Mexico
- Height: 5 ft 11 in (180 cm)
- Weight: Light welterweight; Welterweight; Light middleweight; Middleweight; Super middleweight

Boxing career
- Reach: 74 in (188 cm)
- Stance: Orthodox

Boxing record
- Total fights: 51
- Wins: 35
- Win by KO: 28
- Losses: 16

Michel Rosales (born 24 February 1983) is a Mexican former professional boxer.

== Professional career ==
Rosales became the WBC Continental Americas Light Welterweight champion with a second-round TKO over Colombian Dario Esalas.

On 11 April 2009 he lost against top Welterweight contender, Canelo Álvarez.

In November 2009, Michel had his best win as a pro, beating Mark Jason Melligen over ten rounds.

On 22 December 2012 he lost to Marco Antonio Rubio for the WBF super-middleweight title.

== Professional boxing record ==
51 fights	35 wins	16 losses
By knockout	28	14
By decision	7	2

No.	Result	Record	Opponent	Type	Round, time	Date	Location	Notes
51	Loss	35–16	Elio German Rafael	TKO	5 (12)	5 February 2022	Gym Sandoval, Mexico City, Mexico	
50	Loss	35–15	Salvador Zavala Molina	TKO	2 (6)	18 December 2021	Unidad Deportiva Hermanos López Rayón, Uruapan, Mexico	
49	Loss	35–14	Armando Reséndiz	TKO	4 (10)	26 October 2019	Palenque de la Feria, Tepic, Mexico	
48	Loss	35–13	Marcos Reyes	TKO	2 (8)	27 October 2018	Auditorio Miguel Barragán, San Luis Potosí, Mexico	
47	Loss	35–12	Josue Castaneda Perez	TKO	? (10)	22 September 2018	Palenque Vicente Fernandez, Gómez Palacio, Mexico	
46	Loss	35–11	Marcos Mendez	KO	1 (?)	5 March 2016	Centro Regional de Deporte de Las Américas, Ecatepec de Morelos, Mexico	
45	Loss	35–10	Alexis Salazar Flores	TKO	8 (10)	23 October 2015	Auditorio Heroes Potosinos, Matehuala, Mexico	
44	Loss	35–9	Ivan Montero	UD	8	21 February 2015	Auditorio Municipal, Ocozocoautla de Espinosa, Mexico	
43	Loss	35–8	Jose Pinzon	KO	7 (8)	31 May 2014	Complejo Deportivo La Inalámbrica, Mérida, Mexico	
42	Win	35–7	Manuel Mares	TKO	3 (6)	1 February 2014	Foro Polanco, Mexico City, Mexico	
41	Loss	34–7	José Uzcátegui	TKO	4 (8)	16 November 2013	El Domo, San Luis Potosí, Mexico	
40	Win	34–6	Gabriel Martinez	SD	6	25 October 2013	Deportivo del Sindicato del Metro, Mexico City, Mexico	
39	Win	33–6	Juan Manuel Mares	TKO	3 (6)	4 September 2013	Centro de Convenciones IMSS, Tlalpan, Mexico	
38	Loss	32–6	Marco Antonio Rubio	TKO	11 (12)	22 December 2012	Auditorio del Bicentenario, Morelia, Mexico	For WBF super-middleweight title
37	Loss	32–5	Daniel Sandoval	TKO	5 (10)	14 April 2012	Mexico City Arena, Mexico City, Mexico	
36	Win	32–4	Ricardo Lopez	TKO	4 (?)	25 February 2012	Coliseo Olimpico de la UG, Guadalajara, Mexico	
35	Win	31–4	Julio César García	UD	10	3 September 2011	Centro de Convenciones, San Luis Potosí, Mexico	
34	Loss	30–4	David Alonso López	MD	12	19 March 2011	Gimnasio de la AUT, Tampico, Mexico	For vacant NABA light-middleweight title
33	Win	30–3	Gustavo Octavio Castro	TKO	4 (10)	16 October 2010	Estadio Mobil Super, Monterrey, Mexico	
32	Win	29–3	Édgar Ruiz	TKO	3 (10)	4 September 2010	Arena Solidaridad, Monterrey, Mexico	
31	Win	28–3	Amilcar Edgardo Funes Melian	UD	12	26 June 2010	Gimnasio German Evers, Mazatlán, Mexico	Won vacant WBC FECARBOX light-middleweight title
30	Win	27–3	Eduardo Mondragon	TKO	1 (8)	19 May 2010	Auditorio Plaza Condesa, Mexico City, Mexico	
29	Win	26–3	Orlando Escobar	RTD	5 (6)	6 February 2010	Arena Monterrey, Monterrey, Mexico	
28	Win	25–3	Mark Melligen	SD	10	13 November 2009	House of Blues, Paradise, Nevada, U.S.	
27	Win	24–3	Luis Fernando Uribe	MD	8	20 June 2009	Gimnasio Oscar 'Tigre' García, Ensenada, Mexico	Won vacant WBC FECOMBOX light-middleweight title
26	Loss	23–3	Canelo Álvarez	TKO	10 (12)	11 April 2009	Gimnasio Niños Héroes, Tepic, Mexico	For NABF welterweight title
25	Win	23–2	Omar Vazquez Ramirez	TKO	10 (12)	27 September 2008	Baalbek Club Libanés Potosino, San Luis Potosí, Mexico	
24	Win	22–2	Jose Luis Reyes	KO	4 (12)	15 August 2008	Casa Blanca Disco, Uruapan, Mexico	
23	Win	21–2	Jose Luis Reyes	TKO	6 (12)	5 July 2008	Auditorio Miguel Barragán, San Luis Potosí, Mexico	
22	Loss	20–2	Mike Alvarado	TKO	7 (10)	9 May 2008	Isleta Casino & Resort, Albuquerque, New Mexico, U.S.	
21	Win	20–1	Ricardo Cano	TKO	4 (10)	5 April 2008	Arena Coliseo, San Luis Potosí, Mexico	
20	Win	19–1	Dairo Esalas	TKO	2 (12)	4 January 2008	Alameda Swap Meet, Los Angeles, California, U.S.	Retained WBC Continental Americas light-welterweight title
19	Win	18–1	Americo Santos	TKO	1 (12)	5 October 2007	Cliff Castle Casino Hotel, Camp Verde, Arizona, U.S.	Won vacant WBC Continental Americas light-welterweight title
18	Win	17–1	Gilbert Venegas	MD	8	17 August 2007	El Paso County Coliseum, El Paso, Texas, U.S.	
17	Loss	16–1	Jesús Soto Karass	TKO	11 (12)	20 October 2006	Cicero Stadium, Cicero, Illinois, U.S.	For WBC Continental Americas welterweight title
16	Win	16–0	Fernando Mena	UD	8	28 April 2006	Oceanview Pavilion, Port Hueneme, California, U.S.	
15	Win	15–0	Julio Gamez	TKO	3 (10)	14 April 2006	Arena Coliseo, Monterrey, Mexico	
14	Win	14–0	Manuel Garnica	TKO	7 (8)	16 December 2005	Arena Monterrey, Monterrey, Mexico	
13	Win	13–0	Franner Trinidad	TKO	4 (?)	30 September 2005	Mexico	
12	Win	12–0	Noel Cortez	TKO	3 (10)	2 September 2005	Arena Coliseo, Monterrey, Mexico	
11	Win	11–0	Francisco Villanueva	TKO	1 (6)	7 July 2005	Salon 21, Mexico City, Mexico	
10	Win	10–0	Guadalupe Rodriguez	TKO	3 (?)	1 July 2005	Mexico	
9	Win	9–0	Roque Medina	TKO	2 (4)	29 April 2005	Arena Coliseo, Monterrey, Mexico	
8	Win	8–0	Juan Popoca	KO	2 (10)	4 February 2005	Arena Coliseo, Monterrey, Mexico	
7	Win	7–0	Roberto Vera Ibarra	TKO	1 (8)	10 December 2004	Arena Coliseo, Monterrey, Mexico	
6	Win	6–0	Raymundo Cortez	TKO	3 (?)	21 November 2004	Mexico	
5	Win	5–0	Alfredo Hernandez	TKO	2 (6)	17 September 2004	Auditorio Municipal, San Luis Potosí, Mexico	
4	Win	4–0	Jose Luis Alvarez	TKO	2 (6)	20 August 2004	Arena Coliseo, Monterrey, Mexico	
3	Win	3–0	Freddy De los Santos	TKO	3 (6)	19 June 2004	Auditorio Miguel Barragán, San Luis Potosí, Mexico	
2	Win	2–0	Juan Manuel Sanchez	TKO	1 (?)	14 May 2004	Auditorio Miguel Barragán, San Luis Potosí, Mexico	
1	Win	1–0	Edgar Ibarra	TKO	1 (4)	13 March 2004	San Luis Potosí, Mexico	

== See also ==
- List of male boxers

Sporting positions
Regional boxing titles
Vacant Title last held by Emanuel Augustus	WBC Continental Americas light-welterweight champion 5 October 2007 – 2008; Vacated	Vacant Title next held by Devon Alexander
Vacant Title last held by Michael Medina	WBC FECOMBOX light-middleweight champion 20 June 2009 – 2009; Vacated	Vacant Title next held by Alejandro Barrera
Vacant Title last held by Iván Álvarez	WBC FECARBOX light-middleweight champion 26 June 2010 – 2010; Vacated	Vacant Title next held by Rafael Sosa Pintos
