= David Alonso López =

Mexican boxer (1977–2017)

Personal information
- Nickname: The Destroyer
- Born: David Alonso López; November 24, 1977 Nogales, Sonora, Mexico
- Died: July 6, 2017 (aged 39)
- Height: 6 ft 2 in (189 cm)
- Weight: Light Heavyweight; Middleweight; Light Middleweight

Boxing career
- Reach: 78 in (199 cm)
- Stance: Southpaw

Boxing record
- Total fights: 59
- Wins: 42
- Win by KO: 24
- Losses: 16
- Draws: 1
- No contests: 0

David Alonso López (November 24, 1977 – July 6, 2017) was a Mexican professional boxer who went by the nickname of The Destroyer. He held the IBA Middleweight title.

== Professional career ==
On August 28, 2010 López beat the veteran Saúl Román to win the WBC CABOFE Middleweight Championship.

On March 19 at the Gimnasio de la AUT in Tampico López beat the tough challenger Michel Rosales to win the vacant NABA Light Middleweight title.

In June 2011, López lost to WBA super welterweight champion Austin Trout in June. López defeated compatriot Michel Rosales in a WBA eliminator on March 19. López (40-12, 23 KO) hadn't lost a fight since 2005, going on a 16-fight win streak over that time, and a lot of the guys he's beaten are warriors.

== Death ==
On July 6, 2017 López was shot dead during an incident that took place in his native Nogales, Sonora. It was reported that he was travelling with a passenger just before midnight, when his truck was attacked by bullets. Lopez died immediately before the police arrived. The Red Cross paramedics attended to the second victim.

== Professional boxing record ==
41 Wins' (23 knockouts), 14 loss(s), 1 Draw, 0 No Contest
Res.	Record	Opponent	Type	Rd., Time	Date	Location	Notes
Loss	41-14-1	(Venezuela) José Uzcátegui	TKO	6 (10)	2014-03-08	Domo de la Macroplaza, Nogales, Sonora, Mexico	vacant WBO Latino super middleweight title.
Draw	41-13-1	(United States) Don George	SD	10 (10)	2013-03-22	UIC Pavilion, Chicago, Illinois, United States	
Win	41-13	(Mexico) Julio César García	UD	10 (10)	2012-05-26	Gimnasio Auditorio Jorge Campos, La Paz, Baja California Sur, Mexico	
Loss	40-13	(United States) Austin Trout	UD	12 (12)	2011-06-11	Auditorio Miguel Barragan, San Luis Potosí, Mexico	For the WBA World Light Middleweight Title.
Win	40-12	(Mexico) Michel Rosales	MD	12 (12)	2011-03-19	Gimnasio de la AUT, Tampico, Tamaulipas, Mexico	vacant NABA Light Middleweight title.
Win	39-12	(Mexico) Saúl Román	UD	12 (12)	2010-08-28	(Mexico) Gimnasio Municipal, Mexicali, Baja California	vacant WBC CABOFE Middleweight title.
