= Armando Reséndiz =

Mexican boxer (born 1999)

Personal information
- Nickname: Toro ("Bull")
- Born: José Armando Reséndiz García; February 15, 1999 (age 27) Rincón de Guayabitos, Nayarit, Mexico
- Height: 5 ft 11 in (180 cm)
- Weight: Super middleweight

Boxing career
- Reach: 69 in (175 cm)
- Stance: Orthodox

Boxing record
- Total fights: 20
- Wins: 17
- Win by KO: 11
- Losses: 3

José Armando Reséndiz García (born February 15, 1999) is a Mexican professional boxer who held the World Boxing Association (WBA) super-middleweight title in 2026.

== Professional career ==
=== WBA super-middleweight champion ===
==== Reséndiz vs. Plant ====
Reséndiz turned professional in 2018 and compiled a record of 15–2 before facing WBA interim super-middleweight champion Caleb Plant at Michelob Ultra Arena in Paradise, Nevada, on May 31, 2025, winning via split decision with the ringside judges' scorecards reading 116–112, 116–112, 113–115. He was elevated to full champion on 1 January 2026, after the title became vacant following Terence Crawford's retirement.

==== Reséndiz vs. Munguía ====
Reséndiz made the first defense of the WBA super-middleweight title against Jaime Munguía at T-Mobile Arena in Paradise, Nevada, on May 2, 2026. He lost by unanimous decision.

==== Resendiz vs. Mazoudier ====
On his return to the competitive boxing ring following the loss of his title, Reséndiz defeated Koen Mazoudier via unanimous decision over 10 rounds at The Cosmopolitan in Paradise, Nevada, on October 17, 2026.

== Professional boxing record ==
20 fights	17 wins	3 losses
By knockout	11	1
By decision	6	2

No.	Result	Record	Opponent	Type	Round, time	Date	Location	Notes
20	Win	17–3	Koen Mazoudier	UD	10	Oct 17, 2026	The Cosmopolitan, Paradise, Nevada, U.S.	
19	Loss	16–3	Jaime Munguia	UD	12	May 2, 2026	T-Mobile Arena, Paradise, Nevada, U.S.	Lost WBA super-middleweight title
18	Win	16–2	Caleb Plant	SD	12	May 31, 2025	Michelob Ultra Arena, Paradise, Nevada, U.S.	Won WBA interim super-middleweight title
17	Win	15–2	Fernando Paliza	TKO	5 (6), 1:35	Feb 21, 2025	Guadalajara, Mexico	
16	Loss	14–2	Elijah Garcia	TKO	8 (10), 1:23	Sep 30, 2023	T-Mobile Arena, Paradise, Nevada, U.S.	
15	Win	14–1	Jarrett Hurd	KO	10 (10), 0:05	Mar 4, 2023	Toyota Arena, Ontario, California, U.S.	
14	Win	13–1	Heber Rondon	TKO	2 (8), 2:59	Oct 15, 2022	Caribe Royale, Orlando, Florida, U.S.	
13	Loss	12–1	Marcos Hernandez	UD	10	Sep 5, 2021	Armory, Minneapolis, Minnesota, U.S.	
12	Win	12–0	Quilisto Madera	SD	8	Apr 20, 2021	Shrine Auditorium and Expo Hall, Los Angeles, California, U.S.	
11	Win	11–0	Joaquin Murrieta Lucio	RTD	8 (10), 3:00	Jan 25, 2020	Palenque de la Feria, Tepic, Mexico	
10	Win	10–0	Michel Rosales	TKO	4 (10), 2:42	Oct 26, 2019	Palenque de la Feria, Tepic, Mexico	
9	Win	9–0	Jaime Hernandez Lopez	TKO	10 (10), 2:30	Sep 21, 2019	Gimnasio de Combates de la Feria, Tepic, Mexico	
8	Win	8–0	Miguel Angel Suarez	TKO	2 (6), 0:47	Jun 22, 2019	Ahualulco de Mercado, Mexico	
7	Win	7–0	Alexander Rosales Cruz	TKO	4 (6), 1:40	Apr 6, 2019	Grand Oasis Arena, Cancún, Mexico	
6	Win	6–0	Jose Antonio Leos	TKO	3 (8), 2:45	Feb 16, 2019	Palenque de la Feria, Tepic, Mexico	
5	Win	5–0	Refugio Macoi	KO	1 (8), 2:26	Dec 1, 2018	Palenque de la Feria, Tepic, Mexico	
4	Win	4–0	Sergio Navarro Gutierrez	KO	2 (6), 2:30	Oct 6, 2018	San Vicente, Mexico	
3	Win	3–0	Gabriel Hernandez	UD	4	Jul 14, 2018	Tuxpan, Mexico	
2	Win	2–0	Reymundo Lopez	UD	4	Apr 28, 2018	Palenque de la Feria, Tepic, Mexico	
1	Win	1–0	Diego Emilio Mojarras	UD	4	Feb 23, 2018	Palenque de la Feria, Tepic, Mexico	

== See also ==
- List of male boxers
- List of Mexican boxing world champions
- List of world super-middleweight boxing champions

Sporting positions
World boxing titles
Preceded by Caleb Plant	WBA super-middleweight champion Interim title May 31, 2025 – December 16, 2025; Promoted	Vacant
Vacant Title last held by David Morrell as Regular champion	WBA super-middleweight champion January 1 – May 2, 2026	Succeeded by Jaime Munguia
