= Caleb Plant =

American boxer (born 1992)

- Plant in 2023

Personal information
- Nickname: Sweethands
- Born: Caleb Hunter Plant; July 8, 1992 (age 34) Ashland City, Tennessee, U.S.
- Height: 6 ft 1 in (185 cm)
- Weight: Super middleweight

Boxing career
- Reach: 74 in (188 cm)
- Stance: Orthodox

Boxing record
- Total fights: 26
- Wins: 23
- Win by KO: 14
- Losses: 3
Medal record
Men's amateur boxing
Golden Gloves
Gold medal – first place	2011 Indianapolis	Light heavyweight

Caleb Hunter Plant (born July 8, 1992) is an American professional boxer who has held the International Boxing Federation (IBF) super middleweight title from 2019 to 2021 and the World Boxing Association (WBA) interim super middleweight title from 2024 to 2025.

== Amateur career ==
Caleb Plant took up boxing at age 9. He won the 2011 Golden Gloves in the light heavyweight division. Plant was an alternate for the 2012 Summer Olympics. As an amateur, Caleb won numerous tournament titles while compiling a record of 97 wins with 20 defeats.

== Professional career ==
=== Early career ===
Plant made his professional debut on May 10, 2014, when he was scheduled to fight Travis Davidson. He won the fight by a first-round knockout, ending the fight after just 47 seconds. He won his next eight fights, five of them by stoppage. Plant won his next two fight against Jamar Freeman and Tyrone Brunson by decision, before scoring another two knockouts against Adasat Rodriguez and Carlos Galvan.

Plant fought Juan De Angel on August 23, 2016. It was the first ten-round fight in Plant's career. He won the fight by a convincing unanimous decision, with all three judges scoring the fight 100–89 in his favor.

Plant fought Thomas Awimbono in the main event of PBC on FOX, on February 25, 2017. Plant beat Awimbono by unanimous decision, with scores of 100–89, 100–89 and 99–90.

Plant fought Alan Campa on September 8, 2017. Campa later withdrew from the bout, for undisclosed reasons, and was replaced by Andrew Hernandez. The fight was Plant's Showtime Championship Boxing debut. Plant completely dominated his opponent, with the judges awarding him every single round of the fight.

Plant, at the time the #6 ranked IBF super middleweight was scheduled to fight the #12 ranked Rogelio Medina, on February 17, 2018. The match was an IBF super middleweight eliminator for the number #2 ranking slot, as well as for the position of the IBF mandatory title challenger. Plant utilized his jab to score points and accumulate damage on the advancing Medina, while using his superior ring-craft to stay out of Medina's punching range. Plant won the fight by a wide unanimous decision, with scores of 120–108, 119–109, 117–111.

=== IBF super middleweight champion ===
==== Plant vs. Uzcátegui ====
In his 18th professional fight, Plant was scheduled to challenge the reigning IBF super middleweight champion José Uzcátegui, on January 13, 2019. Uzcátegui was the former interim IBF super middleweight champion, and was later elevated to full champion when James DeGale vacated his title. It was Uzcátegui's first title defense. Plant was the IBF mandatory, having earned the right to challenge for the title after defeating Rogelio Medina by unanimous decision. The fight was later postponed, as Plant suffered a broken left hand in training camp. Plant needed surgery to repair the injury followed by rehabilitation. While Plant was recovering from his injury, Uzcátegui beat Ezequiel Maderna by unanimous decision, in a non-title bout contested on September 28, 2018. His fight with Uzcátegui was rescheduled for January 13, 2019. The eleven-month layoff from his bout with Medina was the longest in Plant's professional career. Plant came into the bout as a +161 underdog, while Uzcátegui was a -200 favorite to defend the title.

Plant got off to a great start, managing to score a knockdown in the second round. He had caught the off-balanced Uzcátegui with a left hook, which dropped the champion to the canvas. After sustaining a cut outside his right eye in the third round, Plant would once again knock the champion down with a left hook in the fourth round. Sticking to his outfighting gameplan, Plant remained dominant until the ninth round, during which he was staggered by a short uppercut from Uzcátegui. After losing both the ninth and tenth rounds, Plant made a comeback in the eleventh round. Plant won the fight by unanimous decision, with scores of 116–110, 116–110 and 115–111. Plant out-landed Uzcátegui by 217 to 157 punches, landing more jabs and power shots along the way.

==== Plant vs. Lee ====
Plant made his first IBF title defense against Mike Lee, on July 20, 2019. Lee had spent his career competing at light-heavyweight, but moved down to super middleweight to challenge for his first world championship. The fight was scheduled as the lead-in for the Manny Pacquiao vs. Keith Thurman pay-per-view. As Lee was moving down from light-heavyweight, and considering he had never faced the level of opposition that Plant had, Lee wasn't seen as a serious threat to Plant. Accordingly, Plant came into the bout as a -1944 favorite, while Lee was a +1119 underdog.

Plant completely dominated his opponent throughout the bout, earning a technical knockout victory midway through the third round. Plant knocked Lee down after just 37 seconds into the first round, and out-landed the challenger 18–3. Plant staggered Lee with a body shot in the second round, and increased the number of landed shots to 41, compared to Lee's seven. Plant knocked his opponent down three times in the third round: the first knockdown came after Plant landed a right straight, the second after a left hook, while the third knockdown was once again the result of a right straight. Referee Robert Byrd decided to stop the bout at the 1:29 minute mark. Lee's domination was such that The Ring magazine declared him a "glorified club fighter".

==== Plant vs. Feigenbutz ====
For his second title defense, Plant fought the #3 ranked IBF super middleweight and mandatory challenger Vincent Feigenbutz, on February 15, 2020. The fight was scheduled as the main event for PBC on Fox, and was Plant's first fight in his native Nashville. Feigenbutz was seen as yet another easy opponent for Plant, with The Athletic stating it would be "hard to envision Plant having much trouble defusing Feigenbutz's offense and then finding a rhythm and turning the bout into target practice". Plant came into the bout as an overwhelming favorite.

Plant justified his role as the favorite, winning by a tenth-round technical knockout, after dominating Feigenbutz through all ten rounds leading up to the knockout. Plant, the longer and taller fighter, utilized his jab to keep the shorter Feigenbutz at distance. After establishing his jab, Plant landed power shots to both the body and head of his opponent. Referee Malik Waleed finally stepped in at the 2:23 minute mark of the tenth round, deeming Feigenbutz unable to continue intelligently defending himself. Afterward, Feigenbutz said: "I can't disagree with the stoppage. The referee did a very good job".

==== Plant vs. Truax ====
Plant made his third title defense against the former IBF super middleweight titleholder Caleb Truax, on January 30, 2021. It was the second consecutive time that Plant headlined a PBC on Fox event. Truax was seen as a step-up in competition, compared to Plant's last two opponents. However, many fans expressed their disappointment with the match-up, as it was expected that Plant would fight Canelo Álvarez in a super middleweight title unification bout. Regarding the Canelo fight, Plant said in a pre-fight interview: "my manager Luis DeCubas just felt like with that being five weeks away, which is about four weeks of training, he just felt like a fight of that magnitude that he didn't want to pull the trigger on it".

Plant dominated the fight by outboxing Truax from a distance, while Truax tried unsuccessfully to get closer and force the action at close range. Truax suffered a bruise and a cut by the end of the fourth round. In the fifth, Truax upped the pressure, but Plant used his jab punch to stay out of trouble. Round eight saw Truax connect with a troublesome right to Plant's jaw, while Plant tried to get a knockout win in the ninth, becoming a bit more aggressive. In the twelfth and final round, Truax, seemingly sensing he needed a knockout to win the fight, threw punches from all angles in an effort to land a knockout punch, but Plant did not get hurt. After the scheduled twelve rounds of fighting were over, Plant was announced as winner by unanimous decision, the three judges scoring the bout by 120–108 in his favor, meaning he won all twelve rounds on each of the judges' scorecards.

==== Plant vs. Álvarez ====
Plant fought the reigning WBA (Super), WBC, WBO and The Ring super middleweight champion Canelo Álvarez in a title unification bout on November 6, 2021, at the MGM Grand Garden Arena in Paradise, Nevada, United States. The winner of the bout was set to become the first undisputed super middleweight champion in boxing history. Plant entered the bout as an underdog for the first time since his fight with José Uzcátegui, with most odds-makers having him as a +550 underdog. Plant lost the bout via eleventh-round technical knockout losing the IBF title, with the loss also being the very first in his professional career. At the time of the stoppage, Plant was behind on all three scorecards with 98–92, 96–94, and 97–93. Plant earned a $10 million guaranteed purse, plus 40% of the PPV proceeds.

=== Post championship career ===
==== Plant vs. Dirrell ====
Plant was booked to face the former two-time WBC super middleweight champion Anthony Dirrell in a WBC super middleweight title eliminator, on the undercard of the Deontay Wilder vs. Robert Helenius heavyweight bout, which took place at the Barclays Center in New York City. It was broadcast as part of a FOX Sports PBC pay-per-view on October 15, 2022. Plant knocked out Dirrell in the ninth round with an emphatic left hook to the head, before immediately celebrating by miming digging his opponent's grave while Dirrell was receiving medical attention, as he still remained motionless on the canvas. Although referee Harvey Dock was quick to attempt to prevent Plant from celebrating in this manner, Plant continued to mime grave-digging.

==== Plant vs. Benavidez ====
On November 3, 2022, Plant and David Benavidez both revealed that they had agreed terms to face each other. The fight was scheduled as the main event of a Showtime pay-per-view, which took place on March 25, 2023, at the MGM Grand Garden Arena in Las Vegas, Nevada. Despite starting off the fight fast, Benavidez found a way back and Plant was heavily stunned and hurt near the end of the bout. He lost by unanimous decision with the scores of 117–111, 116–112 and 115–113.

==== Plant vs. McCumby ====
Plant was set to face Trevor McCumby for the vacant interim WBA super middleweight title at T-Mobile Arena in Las Vegas on September 14, 2024. He won the fight via ninth-round TKO.

==== Plant vs. Resendiz ====
Plant was scheduled to defend his interim WBA super middleweight title against Jose Armando Resendiz at Michelob Ultra Arena in Las Vegas on May 31, 2025. A fight that Plant was the clear and heavy favorite. Resendiz fought spectacularly, putting Plant in a position that he has only been a handful of times. In the 6th Round, Resendiz rocked Plant, leaving him wobbling and on the verge of being KOed. Plant survived the entirety of the match, but Resendiz managed to pull one of this year’s biggest upsets in Professional Boxing.

==== Plant vs. Charlo ====
In November 2025, it was reported that talks had begun for a grudge match between Plant and former middleweight world champion Jermall Charlo (34-0, 23 KOs) to take place in 2026. This was despite the fact that Plant lost his last fight. In December, Charlo confirmed via Brian Custer’s YouTube channel, that the fight would take place January 31, 2026. Originally, he was aiming for the fight to take place before the year end, however, this was not possible.

== Personal life ==
Plant's daughter, Alia Plant, suffered an unknown medical condition that caused seizures. Alia died in January 2015, at the age of 19 months after she caught a respiratory infection which developed to pneumonia.

In March 2019, his mother, Beth Plant, was shot by police after pulling a knife on an officer. She later died in a hospital.

Plant is married to Jordan Plant, a Fox Sports reporter. They met in 2016 and were married in November 2019.

== Professional boxing record ==
26 fights	23 wins	3 losses
By knockout	14	1
By decision	9	2

No.	Result	Record	Opponent	Type	Round, time	Date	Location	Notes
26	Loss	23–3	Armando Reséndiz	SD	12	May 31, 2025	Michelob Ultra Arena, Paradise, Nevada, U.S.	Lost WBA interim super middleweight title
25	Win	23–2	Trevor McCumby	TKO	9 (12), 2:59	Sep 14, 2024	T-Mobile Arena, Paradise, Nevada, U.S.	Won vacant WBA interim super middleweight title
24	Loss	22–2	David Benavidez	UD	12	Mar 25, 2023	MGM Grand Garden Arena, Paradise, Nevada, U.S.	For WBC interim super middleweight title
23	Win	22–1	Anthony Dirrell	KO	9 (12), 2:57	Oct 15, 2022	Barclays Center, New York City, New York, U.S.	
22	Loss	21–1	Canelo Álvarez	TKO	11 (12), 1:05	Nov 6, 2021	MGM Grand Garden Arena, Paradise, Nevada, U.S.	Lost IBF super middleweight title; For WBA (Super), WBC, WBO, and The Ring super middleweight titles
21	Win	21–0	Caleb Truax	UD	12	Jan 30, 2021	Shrine Exposition Center, Los Angeles, California, U.S	Retained IBF super middleweight title
20	Win	20–0	Vincent Feigenbutz	TKO	10 (12), 2:23	Feb 15, 2020	Bridgestone Arena, Nashville, Tennessee, U.S.	Retained IBF super middleweight title
19	Win	19–0	Mike Lee	TKO	3 (12), 1:29	Jul 20, 2019	MGM Grand Garden Arena, Paradise, Nevada, U.S.	Retained IBF super middleweight title
18	Win	18–0	José Uzcátegui	UD	12	Jan 13, 2019	Microsoft Theater, Los Angeles, California, U.S.	Won IBF super middleweight title
17	Win	17–0	Rogelio Medina	UD	12	Feb 17, 2018	Don Haskins Center, El Paso, Texas, U.S.	
16	Win	16–0	Andrew Hernandez	UD	10	Sep 8, 2017	The Joint, Paradise, Nevada, U.S.	
15	Win	15–0	Thomas Awimbono	UD	10	Feb 25, 2017	Legacy Arena, Birmingham, Alabama, U.S.	
14	Win	14–0	Juan De Angel	UD	10	Aug 23, 2016	Sands Casino Event Center, Bethlehem, Pennsylvania, U.S.	
13	Win	13–0	Carlos Galvan	KO	4 (8), 1:24	Jun 3, 2016	Seminole Hard Rock Hotel & Casino, Hollywood, Florida, U.S.	
12	Win	12–0	Adasat Rodriguez	TKO	6 (8), 2:37	Jan 19, 2016	Club Nokia, Los Angeles, California, U.S.	
11	Win	11–0	Tyrone Brunson	UD	8	Oct 31, 2015	NRG Arena, Houston, Texas, U.S.	
10	Win	10–0	Jamar Freeman	UD	8	Sep 22, 2015	Sands Casino Event Center, Bethlehem, Pennsylvania, U.S.	
9	Win	9–0	Zoltan Sera	TKO	1 (6), 2:19	Aug 15, 2015	Place Bell, Laval, Quebec, Canada	
8	Win	8–0	Juan Carlos Rojas	TKO	4 (6), 1:03	Jun 27, 2015	Sands Casino Event Center, Bethlehem, Pennsylvania, U.S.	
7	Win	7–0	Jason Zabokrtsky	TKO	1 (6), 1:49	May 29, 2015	Stadium Holiday Inn, Philadelphia, Pennsylvania, U.S.	
6	Win	6–0	Daniel Henry	TKO	1 (6), 2:29	Mar 6, 2015	MGM Grand Marquee Ballroom, Paradise, Nevada, U.S.	
5	Win	5–0	Daryl Gardner	KO	1 (4), 1:35	Dec 5, 2014	Harrah's Philadelphia, Chester, Pennsylvania, U.S.	
4	Win	4–0	Jovan Ramirez	KO	1 (4), 2:09	Nov 1, 2014	UIC Pavilion, Chicago, Illinois, U.S.	
3	Win	3–0	Brian True	KO	3 (4), 2:55	Jul 25, 2014	Fantasy Springs Resort Casino, Indio, California, U.S.	
2	Win	2–0	Mike Noriega	UD	4	Jun 27, 2014	The Joint, Paradise, Nevada, U.S.	
1	Win	1–0	Travis Davidson	KO	1 (4), 0:47	May 10, 2014	Galen Center, Los Angeles, California, U.S.	

== Amateur kickboxing record ==
Amateur Kickboxing Record
37 Wins (16 (T)KO's), 8 Losses
Date	Result	Opponent	Event	Location	Method	Round	Time
2013-13-30	Win	(United States) Scott Legus	International Kickboxing Federation	Mounds View, Minnesota, United States	Decision (Unanimous)	5	3:00
Wins the IKF Amateur Full Contact Rules United States Middleweight (170 lbs) title.
2010-07-25	Win	(United States) Richie Plant	2010 IKF World Classic Amateur Championships, Tournament Final	Orlando, Florida, United States	TKO	1	2:59
Wins the 2010 IKF World Classic Amateur FCR Middleweight (170 lbs) title.
2010-07-24	Win	(United States) David Bourne	2010 IKF World Classic Amateur Championships, Tournament Semifinal	Orlando, Florida, United States	Decision (Unanimous)	3	3:00
2010-07-23	Win	(United States) Shawn Dahl	2010 IKF World Classic Amateur Championships, Tournament Quarterfinal	Orlando, Florida, United States	TKO	1	1:43
2009-10-09	Win	(England) Rob Burbridge	USA vs. UK: World Championship Kickboxing	Minneapolis, Minnesota, United States	Decision (Split)	5	3:00
Wins the IKF Amateur Full Contact Rules Super Middleweight (175 lbs) title.
2009-07-26	Loss	(United States) Simon Buettner	2009 IKF World Classic Amateur Championships, Tournament Final	Orlando, Florida, United States	Decision (Unanimous)	3	3:00
For the IKF World Classic Amateur FCR Light Heavyweight (180 lbs) title.
2009-07-25	Win	(United States) Joseph Corneroli	2009 IKF World Classic Amateur Championships, Tournament Semifinal	Orlando, Florida, United States	Decision (Unanimous)	3	3:00
2009-07-24	Win	(United States) Kevin Pearson	2009 IKF World Classic Amateur Championships, Tournament Semifinal	Orlando, Florida, United States	KO	1	1:40
2007-08-12	Win	(United States) Devin Ward	2007 IKF World Classic Amateur Championships, Tournament Final	Orlando, Florida, United States	TKO	3	0:50
Wins the 2007 IKF World Classic Amateur FCR Light Middleweight (160 lbs) title.
Legend: Win Loss Draw/No contest Notes

== Pay-per-view bouts ==
=== Professional boxing ===
United States
Date	Fight	Billing	Buys	Network	Revenue
November 6, 2021	Álvarez vs. Plant	Road to Undisputed	800,000	Showtime	$64,000,000
March 25, 2023	Benavidez vs. Plant	Benavidez vs. Plant	—N/a	Showtime	—N/a

== See also ==
- List of male kickboxers
- List of male boxers
- List of world super-middleweight boxing champions

Sporting positions
Amateur boxing titles
Previous: Robert Brant	Golden Gloves light heavyweight champion 2011	Next: Jerry Odom
World boxing titles
Preceded by José Uzcátegui	IBF super-middleweight champion January 13, 2019 – November 6, 2021	Succeeded by Canelo Álvarez
Vacant Title last held by David Morrell	WBA super-middleweight champion Interim title September 14, 2024 – May 31, 2025	Succeeded by Armando Reséndiz
