= Gilberto Ramírez =

Mexican boxer (born 1991)

Personal information
- Nicknames: Zurdo de Oro ("Golden Southpaw")
- Born: Gilberto Ramírez Sánchez; 19 June 1991 (age 35) Mazatlán, Sinaloa, Mexico
- Height: 6 ft 2 1/2 in (189 cm)
- Weight: Middleweight; Super middleweight; Light heavyweight; Cruiserweight

Boxing career
- Reach: 75 in (191 cm)
- Stance: Southpaw

Boxing record
- Total fights: 50
- Wins: 48
- Win by KO: 30
- Losses: 2

Gilberto Ramírez Sánchez (born 19 June 1991) is a Mexican professional boxer. He won titles in two weight class having previously held the World Boxing Organization (WBO) super middleweight title from 2016 to 2019 and the unified World Boxing Association (WBA) and the WBO cruiserweight titles from 2024 to 2026.

== Professional career ==
=== Super middleweight ===
==== Early career ====
In April 2010, Ramírez beat veteran Jesus Ayala by second-round knockout (KO) in Mazatlán, Sinaloa, Mexico.

On 17 December 2010, Ramírez knocked out the undefeated Rogelio Medina to win the vacant WBC Youth middleweight title. The bout was held at the Gimnasio German Evers in Mazatlán, Sinaloa, Mexico. Starting from 2011, Ramírez moved up to super-middleweight. In his first fight of the year, Ramírez fought 32 year old Antonio Arras and knocked him out via technical knockout (TKO) in round eight. Ramírez next stopped Francisco Villanueva in seven rounds. In July 2011, Ramírez moved back down middleweight to defend his WBC Youth title. He successfully defended the title beating Oney Valdez, Amilcar Edgardo Funes Melian and Samuel Miller all inside the distance. Ramírez went ten rounds with Jaime Barboza (17–6, 8 KOs). Ramírez won via unanimous decision (100–90, 100–91, 97–93). Ramírez next fought at super middleweight against Isaac Mendez, winning via TKO in round eight. Ramírez then went down to middleweight successfully defending the WBC Youth title a final two times against Richard Gutierrez, who Ramírez beat on all scorecards (100–90) and Marcus Upshaw, also winning via ten-round unanimous decision (98–92, 99–90 twice). According to sources in February 2013, Ramírez was on the verge of signing with promotional company Top Rank. This was later revealed to be true.

==== Fighting in the United States ====
Ramírez fought in the United States for the first time in his career on 24 August 2013 at the Civic Auditorium, Glendale, California. His opponent was American Derrick Findley in a scheduled ten-round bout which went the distance. Ramírez won on all three scorecards (100–90 x3). In February 2014, Ramírez defeated Don Mouton at the Laredo Energy Arena, Laredo, Texas. 35 year old Mouton, who had not been stopped in 20 previous professional bouts, was knocked out in round one. Two months later, Ramírez fought at Mandalay Bay Resort & Casino against his most credible opponent to date, 33 year old Giovanni Lorenzo (33–6, 25 KOs). Lorenzo was knocked down in round one, and twice in the fifth. Ramírez claiming the win via TKO and winning the vacant NABF super middleweight title and vacant WBO NABO super middleweight title. Ramírez averaged 30 landed punches per round.

Ramírez had a one off fight in Macau on the undercard of Rigondeaux-Kokietgym title fight. He defeated Junior Talipeau (20–2–1, 7 KOs) via first-round TKO, after knocking him down three times, in the process winning the vacant WBO Inter-Continental super middleweight title. Ramírez was back in US in November 2014 at the Alamodome, San Antonio, Texas, this time beating Fulgencio Zúñiga via eighth-round TKO to retain the titles. Zuniga's glove touched the canvas in round six, but the referee did not credit Ramírez with the knockdown. In round eight, Ramírez unleashed a barrage of punches which were unanswered, convincing the referee to stop the fight. Ramírez had an 80% knockout ratio after this fight, and it would be the last time he won inside the distance until seven fights later on 3 February 2017.

==== Rising up the ranks ====
On 18 December 2014 Top Rank matchmaker Brad Goodman announced that Ramírez would take on his toughest challenge to date on the undercard of Alvarado-Rios at the 1st Bank Center in Broomfield, Colorado, against Russian boxer Maxim Vlasov (30–1, 15 KOs) on 24 January 2015. The bout was set for a catchweight of 171 pounds and would mark the first time Ramírez fought on HBO. Ramírez defeated Vlasov in a closely contested ten round bout (96–94 & 97–93 twice). Ramírez landed 179 of 631 punches thrown (28%) and Vlasov landed 115 of his 411 thrown (28%).

On 18 April, it was announced that Ramírez would return to the ring on 12 June against 35 year old Derek Edwards (27–4–1, 14 KOs) on TruTV. It was pushed back two weeks to take place on 26 June instead. The fight took place at the State Farm Arena in Hidalgo, Texas, as Ramírez defeated Edwards via a ten-round decision. Ramírez won every round on all three judges' scorecards. Ramírez was the quicker boxer and used his reach advantage to box on the outside. Although there was exchanges throughout the fight, Ramírez was getting the better of them, landing the harder shots. Edwards' trainer Jeff Mayweather advised him to get closer and work on the inside, but he was unable to do so due to the reach and size advantage of Ramírez. The referee nearly stopped the fight before round eight ended when Edwards appeared hurt, but he managed to recover and make it to the end of the round. With the win, Ramírez moved closer to a potential world title fight after being ranked in the top 3 by the WBA, WBC, IBF, and WBO.

On 12 September, another edition of Top Rank's Metro PCS Friday Night Knockout series on TruTV was announced with Ramírez appearing on the undercard on 20 November. His opponent was later announced as 27 year old Dutch boxer Gevorg Khatchikian (23–1, 11 KOs) for a scheduled ten round fight at The Cosmopolitan of Las Vegas, Chelsea Ballroom, Las Vegas. Ramírez won on all scorecards (99–91 & 100–90 twice). After the fight, he said, "We came to win and that's what we did. All of the hard work and preparation paid off." With the win, Ramírez became the first boxer to successfully defend the NABF super middleweight title four times.

==== Ramírez vs. Abraham ====
It was announced on 18 January 2016 that #1 WBO Ramírez would be fighting WBO super middleweight champion Arthur Abraham (44–4, 29 KOs) in the co-feature bout on the 9 April undercard of the Manny Pacquiao vs. Timothy Bradley III card on HBO pay-per-view. Ramírez followed an intense training regimen in his hometown of Mazatlán before the fight. The fight card took at the MGM Grand in Las Vegas, Nevada. Ramírez put his name in Mexican boxing history, becoming the first fighter to win a super middleweight world title. All three judges scored the fight 120–108 for Ramírez, who also became only the second Mexican to win a world title in a division heavier than middleweight, the first one having been Julio César González as the WBO light heavyweight champion in 2003. Ramírez won on the punch count by outworking Abraham all night in almost very round. In the post fight interview, Ramírez said, "I took to him a Mexican boxing school. He was a very, very strong puncher, but he couldn't take any movement. I knew halfway through the fight I was going to win the fight. I came here to make history, and I did it." Ramírez improved his record to (34–0, 24 KOs).

On 31 May 2016, Top Rank promoter Bob Arum announced that Ramírez would fight on the undercard of the Terence Crawford-Viktor Postol unification fight on 23 July. Ramírez (34–0, 24 KOs), of Mexico, would have been making his first title defense against Germany's 28 year old Dominik Britsch (32–2–1, 11 KOs). Britsch had won four fights in a row since an eight-round decision loss in 2014, was about to take a big step up in competition. On 6 July, Ramírez suffered a hand injury while training, which ultimately called off the world title fight. Ramírez had a successful hand surgery and according to promoter Bob Arum, he should be able to make a ring return by the end of 2016.

==== Ramírez vs. Bursak ====
In January 2017, negotiations were taking place for a fight between Ramírez and Matt Korobov (27–1, 14 KOs) possibly on the undercard of the potential Manny Pacquiao-Jeff Horn fight in April. Bob Arum announced on 13 February 2017 that Ramírez would be making his first defence in Los Angeles, California, on April 22. It was also announced that Max Bursak (33–4–1, 15 KOs) would be the challenger. Ramírez retained his WBO title in his first fight in over a year as he won every round on all three judges scorecards (120–106). Bursak tried to attack and managed to land some punches, but lacked the punching power to hurt Ramírez who used his footwork to evade any punishment. Bursak was deducted a point in round five and also in round eleven for excessive holding.

==== Ramírez vs. Hart ====
On 19 June 2017, manager and trainer Hector Zápari announced a deal was in the works for Ramírez to defend his WBO title against mandatory challenger and WBO NABO titleholder Jesse "Hard Work" Hart (22–0, 18 KOs) with the fight possibly taking place in September 2017. It was revealed the fight would take place on 22 September 2017 in Tucson, Arizona. On 22 August the fight was made official and an announcement was made for the venue. The fight was to take place at the Convention Center. Hart stated that he wanted to win the WBO title for his father and trainer Eugene "Cyclone" Hart, a former professional boxer who fought in the Golden Ages of middleweights in the 1970s. His most famous opponent was Marvelous Marvin Hagler, which saw Hart lose via TKO. Hart never received a world title fight. Top Rank promoter Bob Arum credited Eugene Hart as being 'the hardest-punching middleweight of his time'.

In front of 4,103 fans, Ramírez retained his WBO super middleweight title in a hard-fought battle against a game Hart, which went the twelve round distance. The final judges scorecards were 115–112 twice, and 114–113 in favour of Ramírez. He started off strong, dropping Hart in round two following a left uppercut, which Hart did not see coming. Hart beat the count and survived the round. In round four, Hart took tremendous punishment, but managed to stay on his feet. The last six rounds saw the fight turnaround in favour of Hart. He landed many power shots to the head of Ramírez, who held his own. Ramírez seemed to have tired out during the closing rounds. Round eleven saw Hart rock Ramírez badly, but not realizing that his legs had given way, thus failing to go for the finish. Had Hart not been dropped in round two, the fight would have ended via majority decision. After the fight, Ramírez said, "This one was for all the Dreamers, all the people of Mexico and what they are going through with the earthquake. The plan was push, push, push and put a lot of pressure on him and keep him off balance. I wanted to put on a really big body attack every round. There was nothing easy in this fight." Hart was humble in defeat, "I take nothing away from him. He's a good champ. He has my respect. The knockdown was my fault. Zurdo's a really good fighter." Ramírez landed 220 punches from 690 thrown (32%), this included 40 of his 70 power shots thrown. Hart landed 132 of his 497 thrown (27%). The whole card averaged 706,000 viewers on ESPN.

==== Ramírez vs. Ahmed ====
Top Rank's Bob Arum spoke to Boxing Scene on 24 October 2017 outlining the future for Ramírez. He stated that Ramírez would return on 3 February 2018 in the United States, then return to Mazatlán, Mexico, which would mark his first fight in his home country since April 2013 and then likely see a third fight in 2018 possibly in Australia. Arum mentioned Australia boxer Rohan Murdock (20–1, 15 KOs) as a potential opponent.

On 14 November, Arum announced WBO Africa titleholder and #6 WBO ranked Habib "Wild Hurricane" Ahmed (22–0, 17 KOs) would challenge Ramírez on 3 February 2018. This would mark the first ever fight outside his native Ghana for Ahmed. The fight was scheduled to take place at the American Bank Center in Corpus Christi, Texas. Prior to the fight, Ahmed had won 8 of his last 9 fights via stoppage. In front of 3,200 in attendance Ramírez retained his WBO title against Ahmed via a 6th round stoppage win. Ahmed used his head movement and quick feet to make Ramírez miss a lot of his power shots, but was unable to avoid being hit with body shots. At the time of stoppage, Ramírez had won every round on all three judges scorecards. Ramírez suffered a cut over his left eye in round three from a clash of heads. After the fight, Ramírez said, "I would like to fight with anybody in a unification fight. I want to fight the other champions. I am ready for anyone. I want the winner of the (WBSS) tournament. I want Bob Arum to make that fight.I want to be the best in my division." The fight was stopped at 2:31 in round 6 after an onslaught to the head and body. Ramírez landed 123 of 406 punches thrown (30%) and Ahmed landed only 22 of his 190 (12%). Ahmed never landed more than 7 punches in any round, landing only 1 punch in round four. This was the first time in seven fights, dating back to November 2014, since Ramírez last stopped an opponent. The card averaged 741,000 viewers on ESPN.

==== Ramírez vs. Angulo ====
On 30 April 2018 ESPN's Dan Rafael reported that a deal close to being completed for Ramírez to make a fourth defence against 34-year-old Colombian boxer Roamer Alexis Angulo (23–0, 20 KO) on 30 June at the Chesapeake Energy Arena in Oklahoma City. At the time, Angulo was ranked #10 by the WBO. The card would also include light welterweight prospect Alex Saucedo (27–0, 17 KO) taking on veteran boxer Lenny Zappavigna (37–3, 27 KO). A day later, the bout was confirmed by Top Rank and would air live on ESPN. In front of a small crowd of 5,241 in attendance, Ramírez successfully retained his WBO title in defeating Angulo via unanimous decision. Although Ramírez was the clear winner, the crowd booed as the scores of 120–108, 119–109 and 119–109 were read out. Many media outlets including ESPN had the fight closer. Angulo turned out to be a tougher challenger than expected as he rocked Ramírez on a number of occasions, most notably in the third and seventh rounds, however lack of action on his part led to him losing most rounds. After being hurt by Angulo's hard right hand, Ramírez did well to avoid it for the remainder of the bout. In round twelve, Angulo trapped Ramírez but could not land the right hand. Ramírez, who was not happy with his performance, said, "I tried to do better. I want to go back to training with my team, and we need to keep working, working because I want to be a pound-for-pound fighter. (Angulo) was undefeated. He came in really hungry to come for my belt." Over the last three rounds, Ramírez out landed Angulo 51–28. In total, according to CompuBox Stats, Ramírez landed 178 of 648 punches thrown (28%) and Angulo landed 113 of his 485 thrown (23%). After the bout, Ramírez stated he wanted to unify the super middleweight division. The entire telecast averaged 632,000 viewers.

==== Ramírez vs. Hart II ====
By October 2018, Jesse Hart (25–1, 21 KOs) became the mandatory challenger for Ramírez's WBO title. It was slated the two would have a rematch in December 2018. In November, the fight was officially announced to take place at the American Bank Center in Corpus Christi, Texas, on 14 December 2018. Promoter Bob Arum believed both boxers had improved from their first bout, which took place in September 2017 and was a fight of the year candidate. The first bout was also considered as Ramírez's toughest WBO title defence. The bout was to main event the ESPN+ broadcast. The Mexican earned a narrow victory by majority decision, with two 115–113 scorecards and a 114–114.

=== Light Heavyweight ===
In February, 2019, Ramírez, with the support of his team and Top Rank, announced that he will be moving in weight to seek new fights at light heavyweight.

==== Ramírez vs. Karpency ====
On 12 April 2019, on the Lomachenko vs Crolla undercard, Ramírez made his debut at 175 pounds against former world title challenger Tommy Karpency. Ramírez managed to force Karpency to retire in his corner at the end of the fourth round, throwing 316 punches during the process, landing 83, of which 30 were body shots. Karpency later claimed that his ribs were broken after 30 seconds of action.

In early 2020, the Mexican was ordered by the WBO to fight Eleider Álvarez, but he did not confirm interest. After disagreements with Top Rank, he became a free agent in July 2020.

==== Ramírez vs. López ====
Ramírez knocked out Alfonso Lopez in the tenth round to claim the NABF title in Galveston, Texas. In his first bout in 20 months, Ramírez dropped Lopez in round two and dominated the fight by maintaining range.

==== Ramírez vs. Bivol ====
On 11 July 2022, the WBA ordered Dmitry Bivol (20–0, 11 KOs) to make a mandatory title defence against Ramírez. The teams had until 11 August to complete a deal before purse bids would be ordered. Bivol was coming off a career-best win, over pound-for-pound star Saul ‘Canelo’ Álvarez in May 2022. Bivol's promoters, Matchroom Boxing, asked for an exemption to bypass a mandatory title defence against Ramírez and instead face Joshua Buatsi. The request was rejected by the WBA on 10 August. A purse bid was called for 21 August as the pair failed to come to terms, with a minimum bid of $400,000, with a 75% split in favor of Bivol. The two camps came to an agreement on 21 August. Bivol and Ramírez would face each other on 5 November in the United Arab Emirates.

On 30 August the fight was officially announce via a press release with the debut of 'Champion Series' in Abu Dhabi, with the fight taking place at the Etihad Arena. Ramírez was on a 5-fight win streak at light heavyweight. On the fight finally being announced, Bivol said, “The fight with Zurdo has been brewing for some time, many things have been said. Now we have the chance to take care of things with our actions in the ring, and not our words outside of the ring.” Ramírez was confident heading into the fight. Due to the fight being a mandatory, there was no rematch clause in the contract, however Golden Boy Promotions' matchmaker Robert Diaz declared if the fight was one the public wanted to see again, they would work on a rematch. Ramírez made it known how he pushed for the fight. He argued that Bivol's team never wanted to make the fight, hence asking the WBA for an exemption, in order to fight Buatsi. Both boxers were present at the kick-off press conference and showed mutual respect towards each other. Afterwards, Ramírez spoke to reporters telling them he planned to outwork and outland Bivol in order to become world champion. During an interview with FightHype.com, Ramírez was asked if Bivol was best boxer he would fight. He replied, “Not really. I been in the ring with so many good fighters. I think this is really important for me because it’s a title fight but I been with really good fighters too.” Despite his response, it would be the first time he entered a fight as heavy underdog. His aim was to exact revenge for Mexico after Bivol defeated Álvarez. Both weighed below the limit with Bivol at 174.7 pounds and Ramírez weighing 174.6 pounds.

Bivol made a tenth successful defence of his WBA title, defeating Ramírez by unanimous decision. Bivol started slow losing a couple of the opening four rounds. Bivol dominated with his speed and combinations as Ramírez was out of his depth in the second half of the contest. From the fifth round, Bivol took over and regularly backed up Ramírez unloading sharp combinations to the head. Bivol was able to catch anything Ramírez threw his way with his gloves and arms. Bivol fought on the inside during the championship rounds, showing he was indeed far superior than his opponent. The judges scores were 117–111, 117–111 and 118–110. Bivol outlanded Ramírez 131 to 107 in overall punches and 64 to 38 in jabs, negating his opponent's narrow 69 to 67 lead in power connects. Bivol explained his change in strategy for the fight compared to his previous fight. Many believed Bivol would fight on the backfoot with Ramírez trying to get close to him, however it was Bivol who was coming forward. The reason he did this was to force Ramírez into action, tiring him quicker.

=== Cruiserweight ===
==== Ramírez vs. Smith Jr ====
On 7 October 2023, in Las Vegas, Ramírez made his cruiserweight debut against former WBO light heavyweight champion Joe Smith Jr. He won by unanimous decision.

==== Ramírez vs. Goulamirian ====
On 30 March 2024, at YouTube Theater inside SoFi Stadium in Inglewood, California, Ramírez was scheduled to challenge Arsen Goulamirian for the WBA cruiserweight title. He won the fight by unanimous decision, making him the first boxer from Mexico to win in a title in cruiserweight.

=== Unified WBA and WBO cruiserweight champion ===
==== Ramírez vs. Billam-Smith ====
Ramírez put his WBA cruiserweight title on the line in a world championship unification bout against WBO champion Chris Billam-Smith in Riyadh, Saudi Arabia on 16 November 2024. He won by unanimous decision.

==== Ramírez vs. Dorticos ====
Ramírez defended his unified WBA and WBO cruiserweight titles against former IBF champion Yuniel Dorticos on 28 June 2025, in Anaheim, CA, as the co-main event of Jake Paul vs. Julio César Chávez Jr.. Ramírez won the fight via unanimous decision. According to CompuBox, Ramírez 224 of 620 punches thrown (36.1%) and Dorticos landed 190 of his 616 thrown (30.8%). On July 19, Ramírez underwent a successful shoulder surgery.

==== Cancelled Robin Safar fight ====
It was first reported in January 2025 that negotiations would begin for a possible showdown between WBA and WBO champion Ramírez and IBF champion Jai Opetaia to unify the cruiserweight division. A date in the summer was first discussed, however nothing came from this and both boxers took on interim bouts. Following Ramírez's win over Dorticos, Opetaia's manager Mick Francis stated that negotiations would start and there was no other boxer that would make sense for Opetaia other than Ramírez. In November 2025, it was reported that Ramírez would make a ring return on the Alexis Rocha vs. Raul Curiel rematch undercard on DAZN, scheduled for 16 January 2026 at Acrisure Arena in Palm Desert, California. He was due to start a training camp on 10 November. On 23 November, his opponent was confirmed to be Robin Safar (18–0, 13 KOs), who was ranked at cruiserweight at #9 by Ring magazine. Safar was fairly unknown to the boxing world until he defeated former Pound-for-Pound boxer Sergey Kovalev in May 2024. He had won twice since that win. In December, it was reported that the fight would be postponed because Safar had injured his right hand during a fight in November. There were plans to potentially reschedule the fight for February 2026; otherwise, Ramírez would proceed directly to his fight with Benavidez, which was already scheduled for May 2.

==== Ramírez vs. Benavidez ====
After defeating Anthony Yarde on 22 November 2025, David Benavidez (31–0, 25 KOs) told reporters that he had agreed a fight with Ramírez to take place during Cinco de Mayo weekend in May 2026. Ramírez described the potential fight as a "fight of the year" candidate. On January 13, 2026, ESPN reported that the fight would take place in Las Vegas on May 2. The fight would see Benavidez moving up in weight and attempting to become a three-weight world champion. In March, the fight was facing sanctioning conflicts. The WBA and WBO had been in discussions to possibly withdraw their sanctioning of the bout due to the WBC's unexpected involvement. The WBC reached out to both boxers for a ceremony unveiling a special “Tollan Tlatequi” belt for the winner. They were known for awarding the winner of the Cinco De Mayo fight every year; however, this time, it caused tension with the other organizations involved. The WBO and WBA wanted to maintain control of the championship recognition. Gustavo Olivieri (WBO) and Gilberto Mendoza (WBA) planned to send letters to the key promoters of the event to advise them that if the special belt was contested, they would not recognize the fight's winner with their belts. A few days later, the WBA confirmed it would sanction the fight despite the controversy. During fight week, all matters were resolved in regards to the world titles being on the line, by the sanctioning bodies involved. Ahead of the fight, Ramírez's trainer, Malik Scott, believed his fighter was being underrated and overlooked by boxing fans and experts. He criticized the boxing community, stating that Ramírez was going to be Benavidez's toughest opponent to date. Heading into the fight, Benavidez was listed as a 4–1 favorite by DraftKings. Benavidez weighed in at 196.8 pounds, while Ramirez weighed exactly on the cruiserweight limit at 200 pounds.

== Professional boxing record ==
50 fights	48 wins	2 losses
By knockout	30	1
By decision	18	1

No.	Result	Record	Opponent	Type	Round, time	Date	Location	Notes
50	Loss	48–2	David Benavidez	KO	6 (12), 2:59	2 May 2026	T-Mobile Arena, Paradise, Las Vegas, U.S.	Lost WBA (Super) and WBO cruiserweight titles
49	Win	48–1	Yuniel Dorticos	UD	12	28 Jun 2025	Honda Center, Anaheim, California, U.S.	Retained WBA (Super) and WBO cruiserweight titles
48	Win	47–1	Chris Billam-Smith	UD	12	16 Nov 2024	The Venue Riyadh Season, Riyadh, Saudi Arabia	Retained WBA (Super) cruiserweight title; Won WBO cruiserweight title
47	Win	46–1	Arsen Goulamirian	UD	12	30 Mar 2024	YouTube Theater, Inglewood, California, U.S.	Won WBA (Super) cruiserweight title
46	Win	45–1	Joe Smith Jr.	UD	10	7 Oct 2023	Chelsea Ballroom, Paradise, Nevada, U.S.	
45	Loss	44–1	Dmitry Bivol	UD	12	5 Nov 2022	Etihad Arena, Abu Dhabi, United Arab Emirates	For WBA (Super) light heavyweight title
44	Win	44–0	Dominic Boesel	KO	4 (12), 1:33	14 May 2022	Toyota Arena, Ontario, California, U.S.	
43	Win	43–0	Yunieski Gonzalez	TKO	10 (12), 1:23	18 Dec 2021	AT&T Center, San Antonio, Texas, U.S.	
42	Win	42–0	Sullivan Barrera	KO	4 (12), 2:38	9 Jul 2021	Banc of California Stadium, Los Angeles California, U.S.	Retained NABF light heavyweight title
41	Win	41–0	Alfonso López	TKO	10 (12), 0:59	18 Dec 2020	Galveston Island Convention Center, Galveston, Texas, U.S.	Won NABF light heavyweight title
40	Win	40–0	Tommy Karpency	RTD	4 (10), 3:00	12 Apr 2019	Staples Center, Los Angeles, California, U.S.	
39	Win	39–0	Jesse Hart	MD	12	14 Dec 2018	American Bank Center, Corpus Christi, Texas, U.S.	Retained WBO super middleweight title
38	Win	38–0	Roamer Alexis Angulo	UD	12	30 Jun 2018	Chesapeake Energy Arena, Oklahoma City, Oklahoma, U.S.	Retained WBO super middleweight title
37	Win	37–0	Habib Ahmed	TKO	6 (12), 2:31	3 Feb 2018	American Bank Center, Corpus Christi, Texas, U.S.	Retained WBO super middleweight title
36	Win	36–0	Jesse Hart	UD	12	22 Sep 2017	Convention Center, Tucson, Arizona, U.S.	Retained WBO super middleweight title
35	Win	35–0	Max Bursak	UD	12	22 Apr 2017	StubHub Center, Carson, California, U.S.	Retained WBO super middleweight title
34	Win	34–0	Arthur Abraham	UD	12	9 Apr 2016	MGM Grand Garden Arena, Paradise, Nevada, U.S.	Won WBO super middleweight title
33	Win	33–0	Gevorg Khatchikian	UD	10	20 Nov 2015	Cosmopolitan of Las Vegas, Paradise, Nevada, U.S.	Retained WBO International and NABF super middleweight titles
32	Win	32–0	Derek Edwards	UD	10	26 Jun 2015	Dodge Arena, Hidalgo, Texas, U.S.	Retained WBO International and NABF super middleweight titles
31	Win	31–0	Maxim Vlasov	UD	10	24 Jan 2015	1stBank Center, Broomfield, Colorado, U.S.	
30	Win	30–0	Fulgencio Zúñiga	TKO	8 (10), 2:20	15 Nov 2014	Alamodome, San Antonio, Texas, U.S.	Retained WBO International and NABF super middleweight titles
29	Win	29–0	Junior Talipeau	TKO	1 (10), 1:58	7 Jul 2014	Cotai Arena, Macau, SAR	Retained NABF super middleweight title; Won vacant WBO International super middleweight title
28	Win	28–0	Giovanni Lorenzo	TKO	5 (10), 2:47	11 Mar 2014	Mandalay Bay Events Center, Paradise, Nevada, U.S.	Won vacant NABO & NABF super middleweight titles
27	Win	27–0	Don Mouton	TKO	1 (10), 1:31	1 Feb 2014	Energy Arena, Laredo, Texas, U.S.	
26	Win	26–0	Derrick Findley	UD	10	24 Aug 2013	Civic Auditorium, Glendale, California, U.S.	
25	Win	25–0	Juan De Angel	KO	3 (10), 2:06	20 Apr 2013	Mexico City Arena, Mexico City, Mexico	
24	Win	24–0	Marcus Upshaw	UD	10	17 Nov 2012	Teatro del Pueblo, Cuautlancingo, Mexico	Retained WBC Youth middleweight title
23	Win	23–0	Richard Gutierrez	UD	10	25 Aug 2012	Domo Deportivo, Tulum, Mexico	Retained WBC Youth middleweight title
22	Win	22–0	Isaac Mendez	TKO	8 (10), 2:20	16 Jun 2012	Mamita's Beach Club, Playa del Carmen, Mexico	
21	Win	21–0	Jaime Barboza	UD	10	14 Apr 2012	Auditorio Municipal, Arandas, Mexico	Retained WBC Youth middleweight title
20	Win	20–0	Samuel Miller	TKO	4 (10)	26 Nov 2011	Plaza de Toros, Mexico City, Mexico	Retained WBC Youth middleweight title
19	Win	19–0	Amilcar Edgardo Funes Melian	TKO	5 (10)	24 Sep 2011	Foro Polanco, Mexico City, Mexico	Retained WBC Youth middleweight title
18	Win	18–0	Oney Valdez	TKO	2 (10), 1:42	16 Jul 2011	Lobodome, Mazatlán, Mexico	Retained WBC Youth middleweight title
17	Win	17–0	Francisco Villanueva	TKO	7 (10), 2:13	13 May 2011	Gimnasio German Evers, Mazatlán, Mexico	
16	Win	16–0	Antonio Arras	TKO	8 (10), 2:20	18 Feb 2011	Gimnasio German Evers, Mazatlán, Mexico	
15	Win	15–0	Rogelio Medina	TKO	6 (10), 2:14	17 Dec 2010	Gimnasio German Evers, Mazatlán, Mexico	Won vacant WBC Youth middleweight title
14	Win	14–0	Christian Solano	KO	2 (10), 2:28	19 Oct 2010	Gimnasio German Evers, Mazatlán, Mexico	
13	Win	13–0	Gilberto Flores Hernandez	TKO	2 (8), 1:32	28 Aug 2010	Lobodome, Mazatlán, Mexico	
12	Win	12–0	Guillermo Romero	KO	2 (8), 1:35	30 Jul 2010	Gimnasio German Evers, Mazatlán, Mexico	
11	Win	11–0	Jorge Barrera	TKO	2 (8), 1:54	26 Jun 2010	Gimnasio German Evers, Mazatlán, Mexico	
10	Win	10–0	Jesus Ayala	KO	2 (6), 0:30	30 Apr 2010	Gimnasio German Evers, Mazatlán, Mexico	
9	Win	9–0	Hector Verduzco	KO	3 (6), 0:24	26 Mar 2010	Gimnasio German Evers, Mazatlán, Mexico	
8	Win	8–0	Luis Angel Padilla	KO	1 (4), 2:04	26 Feb 2010	Gimnasio German Evers, Mazatlán, Mexico	
7	Win	7–0	Adolfo Pimentel	UD	4	30 Jan 2010	Auditorio Siglo XXI, Puebla City, Mexico	
6	Win	6–0	Luis Ignacio Castro	UD	4	12 Dec 2009	Plaza de Toros Rea, Mazatlán, Mexico	
5	Win	5–0	Antonio Villanueva	TKO	1 (4), 2:36	21 Nov 2009	Palenque Expomex, Nuevo Laredo, Mexico	
4	Win	4–0	Eliud Duenas	KO	2 (4), 2:40	2 Oct 2009	Gimnasio German Evers, Mazatlán, Mexico	
3	Win	3–0	Blas Camacho	TKO	2 (4)	4 Sep 2009	Parque Revolución, Culiacán, Mexico	
2	Win	2–0	Joel Ramos	TKO	1 (4), 1:52	29 Aug 2009	Ciudad Deportiva, Mexicali, Mexico	
1	Win	1–0	Jeseth Magallanes	KO	1 (4), 0:41	21 Aug 2009	Gimnasio German Evers, Mazatlán, Mexico	

== Titles in boxing ==
=== Major world titles ===
- WBO super middleweight champion (168 lbs)
- WBA (Super) cruiserweight champion (200 lbs)
- WBO cruiserweight champion (200 lbs)

=== Regional/International titles ===
- WBC Youth middleweight champion (160 lbs)
- NABO super middleweight champion (168 lbs)
- NABF super middleweight champion (168 lbs)
- WBO International super middleweight champion (168 lbs)
- NABF light heavyweight champion (175 lbs)

== See also ==
- List of southpaw stance boxers
- List of Mexican boxing world champions
- List of world super-middleweight boxing champions
- List of world cruiserweight boxing champions

Sporting positions
Regional boxing titles
Vacant Title last held by Anton Novikov	WBC Youth middleweight champion 17 December 2010 – April 2014; Vacated	Vacant Title next held by Adam Etches
Vacant Title last held by Adonis Stevenson	NABO super middleweight champion 11 April 2014 – 19 July 2014; Won International title	Vacant Title next held by Jesse Hart
Vacant Title last held by Marco Antonio Peribán	NABF super middleweight champion 11 April 2014 – 9 April 2016; Won world title	Vacant Title next held by Ronald Gavril
Vacant Title last held by Balázs Kelemen	WBO International super middleweight champion 19 July 2014 – 9 April 2016; Won world title	Vacant Title next held by Arthur Abraham
Vacant Title last held by Alfonso López III	NABF light heavyweight champion 18 December 2022 – December 2022; Vacated	Vacant Title next held by Ahmed Elbiali
World boxing titles
Preceded by Arthur Abraham	WBO super middleweight champion 9 April 2016 – 13 May 2019; Vacated	Vacant Title next held by Billy Joe Saunders
Preceded by Arsen Goulamirian	WBA cruiserweight champion 30 March 2024 – 2 May 2026	Succeeded by David Benavidez
Preceded by Chris Billam-Smith	WBO cruiserweight champion 16 November 2024 – 2 May 2026	Succeeded by David Benavidez
