= Rogelio Medina =

Mexican boxer

Personal information
- Nickname: Porky
- Born: Rogelio Medina; September 16, 1988 (age 38) San Luis Río Colorado, Sonora, Mexico
- Height: 1.78 m (5 ft 10 in)
- Weight: Middleweight; Super Middleweight

Boxing career
- Reach: 73 in (185 cm)
- Stance: Orthodox

Boxing record
- Total fights: 50
- Wins: 41
- Win by KO: 35
- Losses: 9

Rogelio Medina (born September 16, 1988) is a Mexican professional boxer who challenged for the IBF super middleweight title in 2016.

== Early life and amateur career ==
Medina started practicing boxing as a kid. Medina would sneak out of his parents' house to practice at a boxing gym. They were unaware of the fact that Medina practiced boxing until he made the newspapers due to his early success. Medina won multiple medals representing Sonora at nation-wide competitions.

== Professional career ==
Medina debuted as a pro in June 2007, at the age of 19. In 2008, he won the WBC FECOMBOX super middleweight title. Following his March 2010 win over Demetrius Davis, Medina suffered two fractures in his right hand. The injury kept him sidelined for 8 months.

Medina won his first 22 fights, 16 of them by way of knockout. On December 17, 2010, Medina faced undefeated Gilberto Ramírez for the vacant WBC Youth middleweight title. The bout was held at the Gimnasio German Evers in Mazatlán, Sinaloa, Mexico. Medina was knocked down in round 6 before the referee waived the count, giving Ramírez the win. Medina then suffered another TKO loss to veteran Yori Boy Campas. Medina suffered a series of losses against the likes of José Uzcátegui and Badou Jack over the next few years, but a knockout win over highly touted prospect J'Leon Love in August 2014 vaunted him into world title contention. Medina was able to corner Love against the ropes and then caught him with a left hook that knocked Love out cold.

After José Uzcátegui was sidelined due to illness, Medina became the mandatory challenger to IBF champion James DeGale. The fight was scheduled to take place on 30 April 2016 at the DC Armory in Washington, DC. DeGale outpointed Medina in a harder than expected fight. DeGale won on all three judges scorecards (117–111, 116-112 and 115–113). The fight averaged of 342,000 viewers and peaked at 397,000 on Showtime. Medina threw over a thousand punches during the fight and he had some success cutting off the ring and cornering DeGale, but DeGale was ultimately able to win the fight with his skills, landing about half of his punches.

Medina was knocked out by David Benavidez in May 2017 in a WBC eliminator. On round 8, Benavidez landed an incredible flurry of punches to Medina's face that ended the fight in dramatic fashion. Medina was dropped twice during the fight.

== Professional boxing record ==
50 fights	41 wins	9 losses
By knockout	35	4
By decision	6	5

No.	Result	Record	Opponent	Type	Round, time	Date	Location	Notes
50	Win	41–9	Oscar Meza	KO	3 (8), 1:26	Oct 7, 2022	Centro de Usos Multiples, Hermosillo, Mexico	
49	Win	40–9	Javier Carrera Tinajero	TKO	3 (8), 1:33	Jul 2, 2022	Palenque de la Expo Gan, Hermosillo, Mexico	
48	Win	39–9	Edgar Santoyo Escalante	TKO	2 (8), 1:58	Jul 31, 2021	Mexico	
47	Win	38–9	Rafael Ortiz Moreno	KO	1 (10), 2:18	Sep 28, 2019	Gimnasio Municipal, San Luis Rio Colorado, Mexico	
46	Loss	37–9	Caleb Plant	UD	12	Feb 17, 2018	Don Haskins Center, El Paso, Texas, USA	
45	Win	37–8	Christian Solorzano	TKO	3 (8), 1:38	Sep 1, 2017	Gimnasio Solidaridad, Hermosillo, Sonora, Mexico	
44	Loss	36–8	David Benavidez	KO	8 (12), 1:01	May 20, 2017	Laredo Energy Arena, Laredo, Texas, USA	
43	Win	36–7	Ramon Olivas	TKO	2 (10), 0:39	Dec 23, 2016	Gimnasio Solidaridad, Hermosillo, Sonora, Mexico	
42	Loss	35–7	James DeGale	UD	12	Apr 30, 2016	D.C. Armory, Washington, D.C., USA	For IBF super middleweight title
41	Win	35–6	Samuel Miller	KO	2 (8), 1:13	May 9, 2015	State Farm Arena, Hidalgo, Texas, USA	
40	Win	34–6	Ernesto Aboyte	KO	1 (6), 1:55	Jan 22, 2015	Club Deportivo Tecate de Bachoco, Guasave, Sinaloa, Mexico	
39	Win	33–6	J'Leon Love	KO	3 (10), 0:39	Aug 8, 2014	Palms Casino and Resort, Pearl Theater, Las Vegas, Nevada, USA	
38	Loss	32–6	Jonathan González	SD	10	May 1, 2014	Hialeah Park Race Track, Hialeah, Florida, USA	
37	Win	32–5	Fortino Lugo	KO	1 (8), 2:59	Mar 21, 2014	Gimnasio del Estado, Hermosillo, Sonora, Mexico	
36	Loss	31–5	Badou Jack	TKO	6 (10), 2:30	Dec 6, 2013	Little Creek Casino Resort, Shelton, Washington, USA	
35	Loss	31–4	Marcos Reyes	MD	12	Oct 5, 2013	Gimnasio Manuel Bernardo Aguirre, Chihuahua, Chihuahua, Mexico	For vacant WBC FECOMBOX super middleweight title
34	Win	31–3	Victor Alfonso León	KO	1 (10), 2:43	Sep 13, 2013	Gimnasio del Estado, Hermosillo, Sonora, Mexico	
33	Loss	30–3	José Uzcátegui	UD	10	Feb 16, 2013	Auditorio Municipal Fausto Gutiérrez Moreno, Tijuana, Baja California, Mexico	
32	Win	30–2	Jaudiel Zepeda	TKO	3 (10), 2:15	Dec 7, 2012	Guaymas, Sonora, Mexico	
31	Win	29–2	Luis David Serrano	RTD	5 (10), 3:00	Sep 1, 2012	Arena TKT Box Tour, Los Mochis, Sinaloa, Mexico	Won WBC Silver super middleweight title
30	Win	28–2	Leonardo Resendiz	TKO	3 (8), 1:05	Jul 19, 2012	Las Pulgas, Tijuana, Baja California, Mexico	
29	Win	27–2	José Pinzón	TKO	1 (10), 2:50	Mar 31, 2012	Poliforum Zamna, Mérida, Yucatán, Mexico	
28	Win	26–2	Jorge Montoya	TKO	4 (8), 2:26	Mar 9, 2012	Expo Forum, Hermosillo, Sonora, Mexico	
27	Loss	25–2	Yori Boy Campas	TKO	6 (10), 1:18	Jun 17, 2011	Explanada Tecate, Navojoa, Sonora, Mexico	
26	Win	25–1	Joel Juarez	TKO	1 (10), 0:38	May 27, 2010	Gimnasio Solidaridad, Hermosillo, Sonora, Mexico	
25	Win	24–1	Arsenio Terrazas	TKO	1 (10)	Mar 11, 2010	Centro de Usos Multiples, Hermosillo, Sonora, Mexico	
24	Loss	23–1	Gilberto Ramírez	TKO	6 (10), 2:14	Dec 17, 2010	Gimnasio German Evers, Mazatlan, Sinaloa, Mexico	For vacant WBC Youth middleweight title
23	Win	23–0	Luis Ignacio Castro	TKO	4 (6)	Nov 5, 2010	Gimnasio Solidaridad, Hermosillo, Sonora, Mexico	
22	Win	22–0	Demetrius Davis	UD	10	Mar 5, 2010	San Carlos Nuevo Guaymas, Sonora, Mexico	
21	Win	21–0	Eduardo Ayala	UD	8	Dec 12, 2009	Gimnasio Municipal, Guaymas, Sonora, Mexico	
20	Win	20–0	Rogelio Sanchez	KO	2 (8)	Oct 16, 2009	Malecon Turistico, Guaymas, Sonora, Mexico	
19	Win	19–0	Jose Humberto Corral	TKO	2 (8)	Jul 31, 2009	Malecon Turistico, Guaymas, Sonora, Mexico	
18	Win	18–0	Jesus Arras Perea	UD	6	Jun 6, 2009	Explanada Tecate, Ciudad Obregón, Sonora, Mexico	
17	Win	17–0	Christian Solano	UD	8	Mar 28, 2009	Plaza de Toros, Tijuana, Baja California, Mexico	
16	Win	16–0	Joel Juarez	RTD	2 (8), 3:00	Feb 14, 2009	Expo Forum, Hermosillo, Sonora, Mexico	
15	Win	15–0	Eliu Dueñas	TKO	1 (10), 1:35	Dec 13, 2008	Gimnasio Municipal, San Luis Río Colorado, Sonora, Mexico	
14	Win	14–0	Daniel Yocupicio	RTD	1 (8), 3:00	Nov 14, 2008	Gimnasio German Evers, Mazatlán, Sinaloa, Mexico	
13	Win	13–0	Jose Humberto Corral	UD	6	Oct 4, 2008	Expo Forum, Hermosillo, Sonora, Mexico	
12	Win	12–0	Arturo Lopez	TKO	3 (12), 2:20	Aug 30, 2008	Expo Forum, Hermosillo, Sonora, Mexico	Won vacant WBC FECOMBOX super middleweight title
11	Win	11–0	Jesus Raul Paez	RTD	4 (6), 3:00	Jul 12, 2008	Palenque De La Expo, Hermosillo, Sonora, Mexico	
10	Win	10–0	Javier Arce	KO	1 (4), 2:55	Jun 13, 2008	Gimnasio Polifuncional, Hermosillo, Sonora, Mexico	
9	Win	9–0	Rogelio Sanchez	UD	6	May 30, 2008	Arena La Sauceda, Hermosillo, Sonora, Mexico	
8	Win	8–0	Fausto Sandoval Lopez	TKO	1 (6), 0:49	Apr 25, 2008	Gimnasio Solidaridad, Hermosillo, Sonora, Mexico	
7	Win	7–0	Noe Flores	KO	1 (6), 0:32	Mar 14, 2008	Hermosillo, Sonora, Mexico	
6	Win	6–0	Benito Abel Ruiz	KO	1 (4), 0:58	Mar 6, 2008	Auditorio Benito Juarez, Los Mochis, Sinaloa, Mexico	
5	Win	5–0	Armando Campas	TKO	1 (6), 0:50	Feb 22, 2008	Expo Forum, Hermosillo, Sonora, Mexico	
4	Win	4–0	Jesus Esquer	KO	1 (4), 1:09	Nov 16, 2007	Parque La Sauceda, Hermosillo, Sonora, Mexico	
3	Win	3–0	Antonio Contreras	KO	1 (4), 1:16	Sep 28, 2007	Salon Eventos Modelo, Guasave, Sinaloa, Mexico	
2	Win	2–0	Jesus Esquer	TKO	1 (4), 1:17	Sep 14, 2007	Parque Vicente Guerrero, Mexicali, Baja California, Mexico	
1	Win	1–0	Alberto Lopez	KO	1 (4), 1:40	Jun 29, 2007	Cesar Palace, Hermosillo, Sonora, Mexico	
