= Mark Melligen =

Filipino boxer

Personal information
- Nicknames: Mighty Mark; MJM Grand
- Nationality: (Philippines) Filipino
- Born: Mark Jason Melligen; 6 April 1986 (age 40) Bacolod, Negros Occidental, Philippines
- Height: 5 ft 7 in (1.70 m)
- Weight: Welterweight

Boxing career
- Stance: Southpaw

Boxing record
- Total fights: 26
- Wins: 23
- Win by KO: 16
- Losses: 3
- Draws: 0
Medal record
Men's boxing
Representing the Philippines
Asian Championships
Bronze medal – third place	2005 Ho Chi Minh	Light welterweight
SEA Games
Silver medal – second place	2005 Bacolod	Welterweight

Mark Jason Melligen (born April 6, 1986, in Bacolod, Negros Occidental, Philippines) is a Filipino former professional boxer.

Born in Bacolod, Melligen grew up in Cebu City, Cebu. He made his professional debut in 2006 and was at some time considered one of the top Filipino prospects in the junior welterweight division. After losing by knockout against Sebastian Andres Lujan in an upset in 2011, Melligen's career went downhill and he fought two more times in 2012 against little-known opponents, winning both matches by early TKO. Bothered by financial problems, Melligen became homeless and was arrested in June 2013 for drug use. He has not fought since this issue.

== Fighting style ==
A southpaw, Melligen is known for his powerful right hook.

== Career ==
Melligen made his professional debut on April 30, 2006, defeating Roland Malonhao at the Island City Mall in Tagbilaran City, Bohol, Philippines.

On August 15, 2009, Mark "MJM Grand" Melligen took on Ernesto "Baby" Zepeda of Mexico in the undercard of “Pinoy Power 2” at the Hard Rock Hotel and Casino in Las Vegas. The Filipino boxer was supposed to face Michel Rosales of Mexico in the 10-round fight. However, Zepeda took the place of Rosales after the latter failed to secure a visa.

Melligen, who fought in the non-title welterweight bout, knocked out Zepeda in the fourth round. The referee Joe Cortez stopped the fight at 2:40 because the Mexican was bleeding on his right eye. Melligen's TKO win improved his record to 16–1, with 12 coming by knockout while Zepeda fell at 39–13–4, with 32 knockouts. After receiving a warm welcome as he entered the ring, Melligen showed some aggressive moves in the first round such as uppercuts and left straight punches. The fighters continued along this way in the second round. In the third round, Melligen took the defensive but still aggressive style as Zepeda took the role of the aggressor. In the 4th, a left straight punch from Melligen sent the Mexican foe down. Referee Joe Cortez decides to stop the fight because of a laceration over Zepeda's right eye.

On November 13, 2009, Melligen was defeated by Mexican Michel Rosales (24–3–0) via a 10-round split decision.

In his next fight, Melligen defeated American Raymond Gatica on February 13, 2010, by TKO in the 6th round. This win marked the first victory for the Philippines in the Pinoy Power 3/Latin Fury 13 card. Melligen improved his record to 17-2 (13 KOs) and his foe experienced his first ever defeat, against 11 wins (with 6 KOs).

He fought Norberto Gonzales (18–1; 12 KO) of Mexico on April 10, 2010. The bout took place at the Hard Rock Hotel and Casino in Las Vegas, Nevada. Melligen won the fight by unanimous decision after 10 rounds, with the scores of 100–90 in all the judges' scorecards.

On July 1, 2011, Melligen faced Argentinian boxer Sebastian Andres Lujan at the Freeman Coliseum, San Antonio, Texas, USA. In what was supposed to be a big break for Melligen, the latter was caught cold, as he was knocked down four times by the underdog Lujan, once in the 6th, 7th, 8th & 9th rounds. Melligen eventually succumbed to Lujan's punches, losing the fight by knockout in the 9th round.

Following the Lujan fight, in the second half of 2012, Melligen fought two more times in the Philippines against little-known boxers, winning both matches by early TKO.

=== Controversy and arrest ===
After losing the fight against Sebastian Andres Lujan, Melligen became homeless and started having financial problems. In June 2013, a buy-bust operation in Mandaue City led to the arrest of Melligen, Joembee “Ombie” Mark Sencio and his younger brother. Melligen was caught using methamphetamine and arrested for drug use along with the Sencio brothers.

During interrogation, Melligen said he was living in the streets and admitted he became a drug user. He also expressed frustration due to being neglected by his trainers and his career going downhill since the Lujan loss.

== Professional boxing record ==
24 Wins (16 knockouts), 3 loss(s), 0 Draw, 0 No Contest
Res.	Record	Opponent	Type	Rd., Time	Date	Location	Notes
Win	23-3	(Thailand) Sapapetch Sor Sakaorat	TKO	2 (10) 2:08	2012-09-21	(Philippines) Cuneta Astrodome, Pasay, Metro Manila	
Win	22-3	(Philippines) Dondon Lapuz	TKO	1 (8) 1:17	2012-07-16	(Philippines) Public Plaza, Baliangao, Misamis Occidental	
Loss	21-3	(Argentina) Sebastian Andres Lujan	KO	9 (10) 0:35	2011-07-01	(United States) Freeman Coliseum, Arlington, Texas	
Win	21-2	(Mexico) Gabriel Martinez	UD	10 (10)	2011-02-19	(United States) Mandalay Bay Resort & Casino, Las Vegas, Nevada	
Win	20-2	(Mexico) Bladimir Hernandez	TKO	3 (10) 2:57	2010-10-30	(Philippines) Cebu City Waterfront Hotel & Casino, Barangay Lahug, Cebu City, Cebu	
Win	19-2	(Benin) Anges Adjaho	UD	10 (10)	2010-07-03	(United States) Grand Sierra Resort and Casino, Grand Theatre, Reno, Nevada	
Win	18-2	(Mexico) Norbelto Gonzalez	UD	10 (10)	2010-04-10	(United States) Hard Rock Hotel & Casino, Las Vegas, Nevada	
Win	17-2	(United States) Raymond Gatica	TKO	6 (8) 2:36	2010-02-13	(United States) Las Vegas Hilton, Las Vegas, Nevada	
Loss	16-2	(Mexico) Michael Rosales Hernandez	SD	10 (10)	2009-11-13	(United States) Mandalay Bay House of Blues, Las Vegas, Nevada	
Win	16-1	(Mexico) Ernesto Zepeda	TKO	4 (10) 2:40	2009-08-15	(United States) Hard Rock Hotel & Casino, Las Vegas, Nevada	
Win	15-1	(Mexico) Fabian Luque	TKO	2 (8)	2009-06-20	(Mexico) Gimbasio Oscar 'Tigre' García, Ensenada, Baja California	
Win	14-1	(Mexico) Ramon Montano	UD	8 (8)	3009-05-01	(United States) Hard Rock Hotel & Casino, Las Vegas, Nevada	
Win	13-1	(Mexico) Gerardo Cesar Prieto	TKO	5 (8) 3:00	2009-03-07	(United States) Mile High Events Center, Commerce City, Colorado	
Win	12-1	(Philippines) Cris Alag	KO	1 (12) 1:19	2008-07-12	(Philippines) West Negros University Gym, Bacolod City, Negros Occidental	Retained Philippine Games & Amusements Board(GAB) Filipino super-lightweight title
Win	11-1	(Thailand) Payakchai Sithparadorn	TKO	1 (6) 2:37	2008-05-02	(Australia) Knox Netball Centre, Ferntree Gully, Melbourne, Victoria	
Win	10-1	(Indonesia) Tia Koswara	UD	10 (10)	2008-02-02	(Philippines) Cebu City Waterfront Hotel & Casino, Barangay Lahug, Cebu City, Cebu	
Win	9-1	(Philippines) Dondon Lapuz	UD	10 (10)	2007-10-13	(Philippines) Calape Sports Center, Barangay Desamparados, Calape, Bohol	
Win	8-1	(Philippines) Jury Noda	RTD	6 (12) 3:00}{	2007-07-10	(Philippines) Island City Mall, Tagbilaran City, Bohol	Retained Philippine Games & Amusements Board(GAB) Filipino super-lightweight title
Win	7-1	(Philippines) Christopher Saluday	TKO	7 (12) 2:56	2007-04-21	(Philippines) New Victorias City Coliseum, Victorias City, Negros Occidental	Won vacant Philippine Games & Amusements Board(GAB) Filipino super-lightweight title
Loss	6-1	(Korea) Yong Sung Kim	KO	7 (12) 2:55	2007-02-09	(Korea) Lotte Hotel, Seoul, Seoul Capital Area	
Win	6-0	(Philippines) Rex Marzan	TKO	2 (10) 1:36	2006-12-08	(Philippines) Talisay City Sports Complex, Talisay City, Cebu	
Win	5-0	(Philippines) Cris Alag	UD	8 (8)	2006-10-21	(Philippines) Mandaue City Sports and Cultural Complex, Barangay Centro, Mandaue City, Cebu	
Win	4-0	(Philippines) Michael Tarsius	KO	3 (6) 1:43	2006-09-24	(Philippines) Island City Mall, Tagbilaran City, Bohol	
Win	3-0	(Philippines) David Pantaras	TKO	1 (4) 0:53	2006-07-22	(Philippines) Island City Mall, Tagbilaran City, Bohol	
Win	2-0	(Philippines) William George	TKO	1 (4) 0:53	2006-07-03	(Philippines) Island City Mall, Tagbilaran City, Bohol	
Win	1-0	(Philippines) Roland Malonhao	TKO	1 (4) 0:41	2006-04-30	(Philippines) Island City Mall, Tagbilaran City, Bohol	Professional Debut
