= José Uzcátegui =

Venezuelan boxer

Personal information
- Nickname: Bolivita
- Born: José Olavides Uzcátegui Duran; 24 December 1990 (age 35) El Vigia, Mérida, Venezuela
- Height: 6 ft 2 in (188 cm)
- Weight: Middleweight; Super middleweight

Boxing career
- Reach: 76 1/2 in (194 cm)
- Stance: Orthodox

Boxing record
- Total fights: 38
- Wins: 35
- Win by KO: 28
- Losses: 3

José Uzcátegui (born 24 December 1990) is a Venezuelan professional boxer who held the IBF super middleweight title from 2018 to 2019.

== Professional career ==
On 16 February 2013 he beat "Porky" Rogelio Medina via unanimous decision over ten rounds.

In the same year he won by a technical knockout in the fourth round against Michel Rosales and also defeated Francisco Villanueva by a technical knockout in the first round.

On 20 May 2017, Uzcátegui faced Andre Dirrell for the vacant IBF interim super middleweight title. Uzcátegui started off strong, controlling the opening rounds. Dirrell saw his success come at the start of the fourth round, countering Uzcátegui and scoring well during the round. In the following rounds, the fight was action-packed with both fighters trading from close range. At the end of the eighth round, Uzcátegui delivered a three-punch combination on Dirrell, of which the third punch was after the bell rang. Uzcátegui was disqualified by the referee and Dirrell was proclaimed the winner. After the fight was over, Dirrell's trainer and uncle Leon Lewson punched Uzcátegui while he was in his corner, which led to other altercations in the ring, which had to be sorted out by security and the local police.

Later the IBF's president, Daryl Peoples, said, although the Maryland commission agreed with the referees (Bill Clancy) ruling, that he made several errors in his handling of the match and thus the IBF ordered an immediate rematch. Peoples said at the time, in part, "The referee made it clear that he had ruled the blow to Dirrell after the bell was 'illegal'. However, the referee did not determine whether the 'illegal' punch was intentional or accidental pursuant to [IBF] guidelines. Had the referee determined that the 'illegal' punch was accidental, the bout would have resulted in a technical decision awarded to Jose Uzcategui, who was ahead on the judges' scorecards after eight rounds had been scored."

In his next fight, Uzcátegui fought Dirrell in a rematch for the IBF interim supermiddleweight title. Uzcátegui was hurting Dirrell throughout the fight, as Dirrell was bleeding early on in the fight. Jacob 'Stitch' Duran, Dirrell's cutman decided to instruct the referee to stop the fight in the eighth round, leading to an eighth-round technical knockout win for Uzcátegui.

On 13 January 2019, Uzcátegui faced undefeated Caleb Plant in his first defense of the full version of the IBF super middleweight title. He lost via unanimous decision via scores of 116–110, 115–111 and 116–110 all in favor of Plant, after being knocked down in the second and fourth rounds.

== Professional boxing record ==
40 fights	34 wins	6 losses
By knockout	29	0
By decision	5	5
By disqualification	0	1

No.	Result	Record	Opponent	Type	Round, time	Date	Location	Notes
40	Loss	34–6	Sharabutdin Ataev	UD	12	11 Jul 2026	VTB Arena, Moscow, Russia	
39	Win	34–5	Jailer Berrio	KO	1 (8), 1:27	15 Mar 2025	Auditorio Mayor de la CUN, Bogotá, Colombia	
38	Win	33–5	Fernando Brito	KO	1 (10), 2:58	19 Jul 2024	Poliedro de Caracas, Caracas, Venezuela	
37	Loss	32–5	Vladimir Shishkin	UD	12	17 Dec 2022	Cosmopolitan of Las Vegas, Paradise, Nevada, U.S	
36	Win	32–4	Felipe Romero	KO	2 (10), 1:52	20 May 2022	Palenque de la FNSM, Aguascalientes, Mexico	
35	Win	31–4	Jaime Hernandez	KO	2 (10), 0:46	12 Jun 2021	Auditorio Bentio Juarez, Los Mochis, Mexico	
34	Win	30–4	Josue Obando	TKO	8 (10), 0:51	26 Mar 2021	Lienzo Charro de Ajijic, Jocotepec, Mexico	
33	Loss	29–4	Lionell Thompson	UD	10	28 Dec 2019	State Farm Arena, Atlanta, Georgia, U.S.	
32	Win	29–3	Roberto Valdez	KO	1 (10), 2:27	21 Sep 2019	La Casa de los Zonkeys, Tijuana, Mexico	
31	Loss	28–3	Caleb Plant	UD	12	13 Jan 2019	Microsoft Theater, Los Angeles, California, U.S.	Lost IBF super middleweight title
30	Win	28–2	Ezequiel Maderna	UD	10	28 Sep 2018	Oracle Arena, Oakland, California, U.S.	
29	Win	27–2	Andre Dirrell	RTD	8 (12), 3:00	3 Mar 2018	Barclays Center, New York City, New York, U.S.	Won IBF interim super middleweight title
28	Loss	26–2	Andre Dirrell	DQ	8 (12), 3:00	20 May 2017	MGM National Harbor, Oxon Hill, Maryland, U.S.	For vacant IBF interim super middleweight title; Uzcátequi disqualified for hitting Dirrell after the bell
27	Win	26–1	Fabiano Pena	KO	2 (10), 1:16	20 Aug 2016	La Cetto Vineyard, Valle de Guadalupe, Mexico	
26	Win	25–1	Derrick Findley	RTD	3 (10), 3:00	18 Jun 2016	Auditorio Municipal, Tijuana, Mexico	
25	Win	24–1	Julius Jackson	TKO	2 (12), 0:45	6 Oct 2015	Cowboys Dance Hall, San Antonio, Texas, U.S.	
24	Win	23–1	Daniel Eduardo Yocupicio	KO	1 (6)	28 Feb 2015	Centro De Convenciones, Rosarito, Mexico	
23	Loss	22–1	Matt Korobov	UD	10	28 Jun 2014	CenturyLink Center, Omaha, Nebraska, U.S.	For vacant WBO Inter-Continental middleweight title
22	Win	22–0	David Alonso López	KO	6 (10), 2:31	8 Mar 2014	Domo de la Macroplaza, Heroica Nogales, Mexico	Won vacant WBO Latino middleweight title
21	Win	21–0	Francisco Villanueva	TKO	1 (6), 2:54	21 Dec 2013	Caliente Hipódromo, Tijuana, Mexico	
20	Win	20–0	Michel Rosales	TKO	4 (8)	16 Nov 2013	El Domo, San Luis Potosí, Mexico	
19	Win	19–0	Jesus Angel Nerio	TKO	6 (8), 0:34	5 Oct 2013	Caliente Hipódromo, Tijuana, Mexico	
18	Win	18–0	Francisco Felipe Molina Jr	KO	2 (6), 0:13	11 Sep 2013	Salon Las Pulgas, Tijuana, Mexico	
17	Win	17–0	Rogelio Medina	UD	10	16 Feb 2013	Auditorio Municipal, Tijuana, Mexico	
16	Win	16–0	Gilberto Flores Hernandez	TKO	1 (4), 0:32	19 Dec 2012	Salon Las Pulgas, Tijuana, Mexico	
15	Win	15–0	Octavio Castro	TKO	3 (8)	29 Sep 2012	Estadio Hector Espino, Hermosillo, Mexico	
14	Win	14–0	Jose Luis Vazquez	TKO	1 (6)	18 Aug 2012	La Cetto Vineyard, Valle de Guadalupe, Mexico	
13	Win	13–0	Edgar Quiroz	KO	2 (6), 0:39	21 July 2012	Auditorio Municipal, Tijuana, Mexico	
12	Win	12–0	Josele Napoles	TKO	4 (6), 2:46	5 May 2012	Auditorio Municipal, Tijuana, Mexico	
11	Win	11–0	Daniel Eduardo Yocupicio	UD	4	17 Mar 2012	Palenque de Gallos, Culiacán, Mexico	
10	Win	10–0	Rolando Paredes	TKO	1 (6), 2:37	18 Feb 2012	Centro de Espectáculos Promocasa, Mexicali, Mexico	
9	Win	9–0	Francisco Villanueva	UD	6	14 Jan 2012	Auditorio Municipal, Tijuana, Mexico	
8	Win	8–0	Guillermo Garcia	TKO	2 (6), 0:53	5 Nov 2011	Auditorio Municipal, Tijuana, Mexico	
7	Win	7–0	Edgar Galvan	KO	1 (4), 0:43	21 Oct 2011	Ciudad Morelos, Mexico	
6	Win	6–0	Rafael Rios	TKO	1 (6), 2:44	8 Oct 2011	Auditorio Municipal, Tijuana, Mexico	
5	Win	5–0	Jesus Arras Perea	PTS	6	3 Sep 2011	Centro de Espectáculos Promocasa, Mexicali, Mexico	
4	Win	4–0	Rafael Duarte	TKO	1 (4)	2 Jul 2011	Centro de Usos Multiples, Hermosillo, Mexico	
3	Win	3–0	Marino Mercado	KO	1 (4), 0:57	11 Jun 2011	Complejo Deportivo La Inalámbrica, Mérida, Mexico	
2	Win	2–0	Alejandro Alonso	TKO	1 (6), 2:03	6 May 2011	Campo de Beisbol Azteca, Mexicali, Mexico	
1	Win	1–0	Ramiro Rosales	KO	1 (4), 1:38	25 Mar 2011	Auditorio Municipal, Tijuana, Mexico	

== See also ==
- List of world super-middleweight boxing champions

Sporting positions
Regional boxing titles
Vacant Title last held by Billi Facundo Godoy	WBO Latino middleweight champion 8 March 2014 – 2018; Vacated	Vacant Title next held by Elias Espadas
World boxing titles
Preceded by Andre Dirrell	IBF super-middleweight champion Interim title 3 March 2018 – 4 July 2018; Promoted to full champion	Vacant
Preceded by James DeGale; Vacated	IBF super-middleweight champion 4 July 2018 – 13 January 2019	Succeeded by Caleb Plant
