= Denis Douglin =

American boxer (born 1988)

Personal information
- Nickname: Momma's Boy
- Born: May 6, 1988 (age 38) Brooklyn, New York City, U.S.
- Height: 5 ft 9 in (175 cm)
- Weight: Middleweight; Super middleweight

Boxing career
- Reach: 73 in (185 cm)
- Stance: Southpaw

Boxing record
- Total fights: 31
- Wins: 23
- Win by KO: 15
- Losses: 8

Denis David Douglin (born May 6, 1988) is an American professional boxer. As an amateur he was the 2008 National Golden Gloves middleweight champion.

He moved with his family to the Morganville section of Marlboro Township, New Jersey, where Douglin attended Marlboro High School, during which time he was in a car accident and had a serious neck injury that could have ended his boxing career.

== Amateur career ==
Douglin finished his amateur career with a 95-9 record. In addition to the 2008 National Golden Gloves Championship, he was the 2007 National PAL champion, the 2007 National Ringside champion, and a three-time state Golden Gloves champion (New York in 2006, and New Jersey in 2007 and 2008). Douglin was honored by the New Jersey Boxing Hall of Fame as its 2008 Amateur Boxer of the Year.

== Professional career ==
Douglin made his professional debut on February 13, 2009, defeating Roberto Irrizarry at the Roseland Ballroom in New York. He went undefeated in his first twelve bouts before falling to Doel Carrasquillo in February 2011. At 14-1 he fought Jermell Charlo (17-0, 8 knockouts at the time) on the Victor Ortiz-Josesito López June 2012 undercard at the Staples Center in Los Angeles and fought former WBC champion Anthony Dirrell (31-1-1) in 2017.
