= Domenico Spada =

Italian boxer (born 1980)

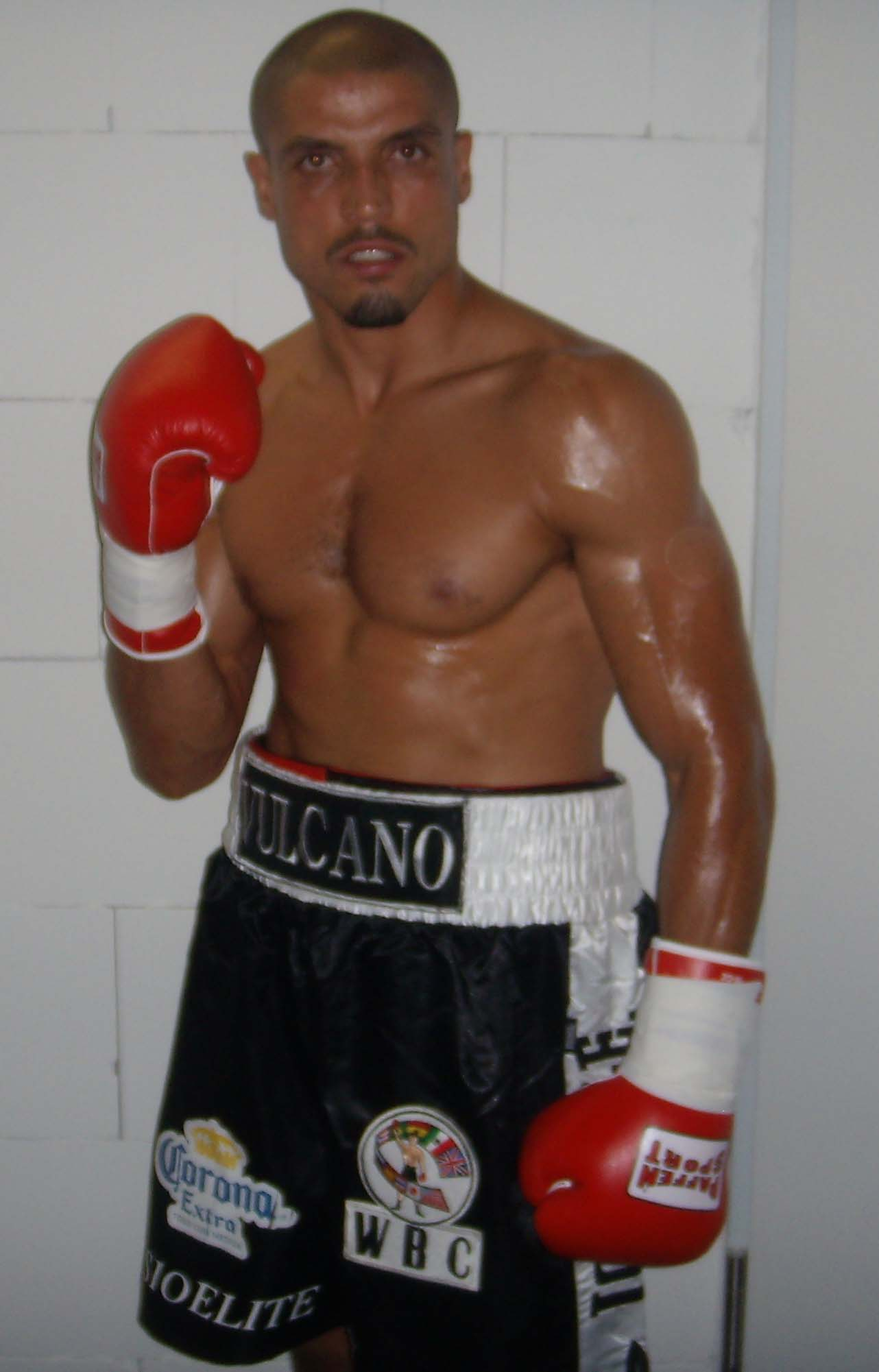

Personal information
- Nickname: Vulcano
- Nationality: Italian
- Born: Domenico Spada; 15 September 1980 (age 45) Rome, Italy
- Height: 175 cm (5 ft 9 in)
- Weight: Middleweight

Boxing career
- Stance: Orthodox

Boxing record
- Total fights: 50
- Wins: 43
- Win by KO: 20
- Losses: 7

Domenico Spada (born 15 September 1980 in Rome) is an Italian professional boxer who has fought at middleweight.

Spada fought Sebastian Zbik for the interim WBC middleweight title twice, losing both bouts by unanimous decision. He also lost to Marco Antonio Rubio and Martin Murray for the WBC Middleweight title .

Other fighters Spada has faced include Darren Barker and Mahir Oral.

== Professional boxing record ==
50 fights	43 wins	7 losses
By knockout	19	2
By decision	19	5
By disqualification	5	0

No.	Result	Record	Opponent	Type	Round, Time	Date	Location	Notes
50	Loss	43–7	(Italy) Mirko Geografo	TKO	6 (10), 2:50	11 May 2018	PalaGems, Roma, Italy	Lost Italian middleweight title
49	Win	43–6	(Georgia (country)) Diego Shamatava	PTS	6	25 Nov 2017	Vulcano Gym, Marino, Italy	
48	Win	42–6	(Italy) Andrea Manco	TD	8 (10)	24 Jun 2017	PalaOzan, Ugento, Italy	Won Italian middleweight title
47	Win	41–6	(Hungary) Jozsef Racz	PTS	8	30 Oct 2016	Marino, Lazio, Italy	
46	Win	40–6	(Serbia) Goran Milenkovic	PTS	6	31 Jul 2016	Marino, Lazio, Italy	
45	Loss	39–6	(England) Martin Murray	TD	7 (12), 1:19	25 Oct 2014	Salle des Étoiles, Monte Carlo, Monaco	For WBC Silver middleweight title; Unanimous TD; Spada was ruled unable to continue due to a cut over the eye
44	Win	39–5	(Bosnia and Herzegovina) Nikola Matic	UD	6	8 Aug 2014	Palafjlkam, Ostia, Italy	
43	Loss	38–5	(Mexico) Marco Antonio Rubio	KO	10 (12), 1:38	5 Apr 2014	Gran Estadio, Ciudad Delicias, Mexico	For vacant WBC Interim middleweight title
42	Win	38–4	(Bosnia and Herzegovina) Marjo Markovic	DQ	2 (6)	28 Sep 2013	Ippodromo Le Padovanelle, Ponte di Brenta, Italy	
41	Win	37–4	(Hungary) Norbert Szekeres	TKO	5 (6), 1:51	8 Jun 2013	Palasport Pentassuglia, Brindisi, Italy	
40	Win	36–4	(Hungary) Sandor Ramocsa	PTS	6	10 Nov 2012	Palasport, Civitavecchia, Italy	
39	Win	35–4	(Poland) Mariusz Cendrowski	UD	12	16 Jun 2012	Stabilimento Oasi, Fregene, Roma, Italy	Won vacant WBC Silver middleweight title
38	Win	34–4	(Hungary) Jozsef Molnar	TKO	1 (6)	18 Nov 2011	Bocciodromo Comunale, Sant'Angelo in Vado, Italy	
37	Win	33–4	(Lithuania) Kiril Psonko	TKO	4 (6)	16 Jul 2011	Horse Country Resort, Arborea, Italy	
36	Loss	32–4	(England) Darren Barker	UD	12	30 Apr 2011	Olympia London, Kensington, England	For EBU (European) middleweight title
35	Win	32–3	(Latvia) Ruslans Pojonisevs	TKO	2 (8), 2:50	17 Dec 2010	Palasport V.le Tiziano, Roma, Italy	
34	Win	31–3	(Hungary) Jozsef Matolcsi	PTS	8	30 Jul 2010	Pomezia, Lazio, Italy	
33	Loss	31–2	(Germany) Sebastian Zbik	UD	12	17 Apr 2010	Bordelandhalle, Magdeburg, Germany	For WBC Interim middleweight title
32	Win	30–2	(Hungary) Norbert Nagy	TKO	1 (6)	5 Feb 2010	PalaTenda, Fuscaldo, Italy	
31	Loss	29–2	(Germany) Sebastian Zbik	UD	12	11 Jul 2009	Nürburgring Race Track, Nürburg, Germany	For inaugural WBC Interim middleweight title
30	Win	29–1	(Slovakia) Robert Blazo	DQ	5 (6)	25 Apr 2009	PalaVeneto, Ancona, Italy	
29	Win	28–1	(Czech Republic) Roman Vanicky	TKO	3 (6), 1:59	2 Dec 2008	Palasport, Pisa, Italy	
28	Win	27–1	(Poland) Mariusz Cendrowski	UD	12	1 Jul 2008	Nuovo Casinò, Campione d'Italia, Italy	Retained WBC International middleweight title
27	Win	26–1	(Belgium) Jamel Bakhi	UD	12	14 Apr 2008	Nuovo Casinò, Campione d'Italia, Italy	Retained WBC International middleweight title
26	Win	25–1	(Czech Republic) Patrik Hruska	PTS	6	22 Dec 2007	Palestra ITIS Marconi, Latina, Italy	
25	Win	24–1	(Germany) Alpaslan Aguzum	TKO	1 (12), 1:56	19 Oct 2007	Estrel Convention Center, Neukölln, Germany	Won WBC International middleweight title
24	Win	23–1	(Czech Republic) Attila Kiss	PTS	6	31 Jul 2007	Centro Polivalente, San Genesio ed Uniti, Italy	
23	Loss	22–1	(Germany) Mahir Oral	SD	12	24 Mar 2007	Alsterdorfer Sporthalle, Alsterdorf, Germany	Lost WBC International middleweight title; For EBU EU (European Union) middleweight title
22	Win	22–0	(Turkey) Mustafa Karagöllü	TKO	8 (12)	15 Dec 2006	Alsterdorfer Sporthalle, Alsterdorf, Germany	Won vacant WBC International middleweight title
21	Win	21–0	(France) Francois Bastient	TKO	7 (10)	14 Nov 2006	Palasport Villa Romiti, Forlì, Italy	
20	Win	20–0	(France) Christophe Karagoz	TKO	4 (8)	1 Aug 2006	Forte Michelangelo, Civitavecchia, Italy	
19	Win	19–0	(Ghana) Joseph Sarkodie	TKO	6 (6)	9 Jun 2006	Stadio della Pallacorda, Roma, Italy	
18	Win	18–0	(Italy) Luciano Lombardi	TKO	10 (10)	30 Mar 2006	Palazzeto Lagrange, Roma, Italy	Won Federazione Pugilistica Italiana (Italian) middleweight title
17	Win	17–0	(Czech Republic) Patrik Hruska	PTS	6	20 Dec 2005	Palazzeto dello Sport, Bergamo, Italy	
16	Win	16–0	(Angola) Didier Nkuku Mupeko	PTS	8	11 Oct 2005	Palasport Sergio Rizzi, Lavena Ponte Tresa, Italy	
15	Win	15–0	(France) Sylvestre Marianini	PTS	6	17 Jun 2005	PalaLido, Milan, Italy	
14	Win	14–0	(Russia) Artur Bochuev	TKO	8 (10), 2:42	19 Mar 2005	PalaLuiss, Roma, Italy	Retained IBF Youth middleweight title
13	Win	13–0	(Tanzania) Idd Kigula	KO	1 (10)	26 Dec 2004	Palazzeto dello Sport, Viale Tiziano, Italy	Won vacant IBF Youth middleweight title
12	Win	12–0	(France) Christophe Karagoz	TKO	3 (6)	5 Oct 2004	Teatro Traiano, Civitavecchia, Italy	Cut injury
11	Win	11–0	(Turkey) Ata Dogan	PTS	6	3 Jul 2004	Modugno, Puglia, Italy	
10	Win	10–0	(Romania) Mugurel Sebe	PTS	4	27 Mar 2004	PalaLottomatica, Roma, Italy	
9	Win	9–0	(Albania) Selajdin Koxha	PTS	6	10 Feb 2004	Cava Manara, Lombardia, Italy	
8	Win	8–0	(Cameroon) Richard Pokossi	PTS	6	14 Oct 2003	Pala Italia Online, Milan, Italy	
7	Win	7–0	(Belgium) Mustapha Stini	DQ	2 (6)	9 Aug 2003	Villasimius, Cagliari, Sardegna, Italy	
6	Win	6–0	(France) Michel Noto	TKO	3 (6)	22 Jul 2003	Piazza Vittoria, Pavia, Italy	
5	Win	5–0	(Italy) Marco Fioravanti	DQ	2 (6)	14 Jun 2003	Modugno, Puglia, Italy	
4	Win	4–0	(Hungary) Jozsef Baksa	TKO	1 (6)	31 May 2003	Civitavecchia, Lazio, Italy	
3	Win	3–0	(Hungary) Csaba Balatoni	TKO	2 (6)	6 Dec 2002	Reggio Calabria, Calabria, Italy	
2	Win	2–0	(Romania) Adrian Sauca	KO	1 (6)	27 Sep 2002	Castelliri, Lazio, Italy	
1	Win	1–0	(Czech Republic) Pavel Habr	DQ	6 (6)	19 Jul 2002	Gubbio, Umbria, Italy	

== Titles Held ==
- WBC Silver Middleweight Title (2012)
- WBC International Middleweight Title (2006–07, 2007–08)
- Italian Middleweight Title (2006)
- IBF Youth Middleweight Title (2004–05)
- challenger for the WBC Middleweight Title (2009 / 2010 / 2014)
- challenger for the EBU Middleweight Title (2011 / 2013)
