= Julio César Chávez Jr. vs. Marco Antonio Rubio =

Boxing match

Welcome to the Future
- Date: February 4, 2012
- Venue: Alamodome, San Antonio, Texas, US
- Title(s) on the line: WBC middleweight title

Tale of the tape
Boxer	(Mexico) Julio César Chávez Jr.	(Mexico) Marco Antonio Rubio
Nickname	"La Leyenda Continua"	"El Veneno"
Hometown	Culiacan, Sinaloa, Mexico	Torreon, Coahuila, Mexico
Pre-fight record	44–0–1 (1) (31 KO)	53–5–1 (46 KO)
Age	25 years, 11 months	31 years, 7 months
Height	6 ft 1 in (185 cm)	5 ft 10 in (178 cm)
Weight	159 1/2 lb (72 kg)	159 lb (72 kg)
Style	Orthodox	Orthodox
Recognition	WBC; Middleweight Champion	WBC; No. 1 Ranked Middleweight

Result
- Chávez Jr. wins via 12-round unanimous decision (118-110, 116-112, 115-113)

Julio César Chávez Jr. vs. Marco Antonio Rubio, billed as Welcome to the Future, was a boxing middleweight bout for the WBC world title. The bout was held on February 4, 2012, at the Alamodome in San Antonio, Texas, United States. where 14,000 fans were attending.

== Background ==
=== Chávez ===
Chávez held an overall record of 44–0–1, having won twenty straight fights since enduring his career's lone blemish six years ago. The bout with Rubio was the rising star's second consecutive clash in Texas, racking up a fifth-round TKO against Peter Manfredo Jr. in Houston last month, and the second time he's visited the home of The Alamo in his previous five fights.

Chávez claimed a middleweight belt in June via a majority decision against Sebastian Zbik and made his first defense on November 19, a fifth-round TKO of Peter Manfredo Jr.

=== Rubio ===
Rubio had gone 10–0 with nine knockouts and was a more confident-appearing fighter.

Among those 10 victories was an impressive seventh-round stoppage of one of the game's elite prospects, David Lemieux, on April 8, 2011. Lemieux entered the fight with a 25–0 record and 24 knockouts and was hailed as a potential star.

He has not lost since being stopped in the ninth round by then-middleweight champion Kelly Pavlik in February 2009.

== Main card ==
- Middleweight Championship (Mexico) Julio César Chávez Jr. vs. (Mexico) Marco Antonio Rubio
  - Chávez defeated Rubio via Unanimous Decision.
- Super Bantamweight Championship (Philippines) Nonito Donaire vs. (Puerto Rico) Wilfredo Vazquez, Jr.
  - Donaire defeated Vazquez via Split Decision.

=== Preliminary card ===
- Super Welterweight Bout (Armenia) Vanes Martirosyan vs. (United States) Troy Lowry
  - Martirosyan defeated Lowry via TKO at 2:53 of Round 3.
- Super Bantamweight Bout (United States) Raúl Hirales Jr. vs. (United States) Shawn Nichol
  - Hirales defeated Nichol via unanimous decision. (59–55, 55–59, 58–56)
- Welterweight Bout (Australia) Wale Omotoso vs. (Mexico) Nestor Rosas
  - Omotoso defeated Rosas via TKO at 0:55 of Round 6.
- Lightweight Bout (United States) Ivan Najera vs. (United States) David Castillo
  - Najera defeated Castillo via TKO at 2:54 of Round 2.
- Welterweight Bout (United States) Alex Saucedo vs. (United States) Jean Colon
  - Saucedo defeated Colon via KO at 1:03 of Round 1.
- Super Flyweight Bout (United States) Adam Lopez vs. (United States) Richard Hernandez
  - Lopez defeated Hernandez via TKO at 2:1 of Round 1.
- Featherweight Bout (United States) Jeremy Longoria vs. (United States) Ricardo Valencia
  - Valencia defeated Longoria via unanimous decision. (36–39, 36–39, 37–38)

== Result ==
Chávez retained the WBC middleweight title, earning a unanimous decision over fellow Mexican Rubio. The judges scored the bout 118–110, 116-112 115-113 for Chávez, which drew a mixed reaction from the 14,120 in attendance at the Alamodome. Neither fighter went down despite taking continuous heavy blows to the head and body throughout the 12-round bout. Chavez Jr. overcame a gutsy performance by Rubio despite having some trouble entering the fight.

== Notes ==
Rubio stated after the fight: "He re-gained a lot of weight. I re-gained my usual weight." and "I feel that he was very well protected. They didn't even do any testing which should have been done". However, Rubio neglected to mention that the local Texas commission also did not test him, along with the co-feature fighters Donaire and Vazquez Jr. According to the commission, they made the mistake of not booking a testing laboratory for the event in advance. Former world champion Julio César Chávez was at ringside, providing Spanish color commentary for Donaire's bout before watching his son's fight as a spectator. Among those in attendance were former world champions "Sugar" Shane Mosley of Golden Boy Promotions and San Antonio native Jesse James Leija.

== International Broadcasting ==
Country / Region	Broadcaster
Canada	Canal Indigo
Romania	The Money Channel
United States	HBO
Philippines	ABSCBN and Studio 23

== Notes ==
Preceded by vs. Peter Manfredo Jr.	Julio César Chávez Jr.'s bouts February 4, 2012	Succeeded by vs. Andy Lee
Preceded by vs. Matt Vanda	Marco Antonio Rubio's bouts February 4, 2012	Succeeded by vs. Jorge Cota
