= Emanuele Della Rosa =

Italian boxer

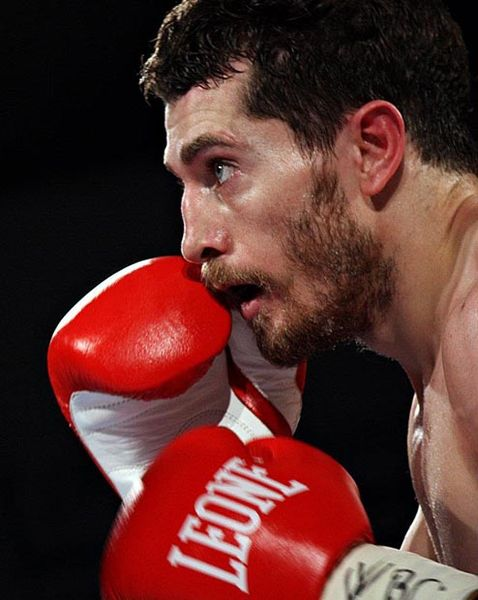

Personal information
- Nickname: Ruspa
- Nationality: Italian
- Born: Emanuele Della Rosa; 21 February 1980 (age 46) Rome, Italy
- Height: 175 cm (5 ft 9 in)
- Weight: Middleweight; Light middleweight; Welterweight
- Website: www.emanueleruspadellarosa.it

Boxing career
- Stance: Orthodox

Boxing record
- Total fights: 42
- Wins: 37
- Win by KO: 10
- Losses: 4
- Draws: 1

Emanuele Della Rosa (born 21 February 1980 in Rome) is an Italian professional boxer, who has fought from the welterweight to the middleweight division.

Former challenger for the WBC interim middleweight title (2009) and for the EBU title (2013/2014).

Is currently trained by Valerio Monti.

== Professional Record ==
Professional record composes of 42 bouts: 37 wins (10 KOs), only 4 losses and 1 draw.

== Professional boxing record ==
42 fights	37 wins	4 losses
By knockout	10	1
By decision	27	3
Draws	1	

No.	Result	Record	Opponent	Type	Round, time	Date	Location	Notes
42	Loss	37–4–1	(France) Andrew Francillette	TD	9 (12)	8 Jun 2008	Parc des sports et loisir Alexis Vastine, Pont-Audemer, France	Unanimous TD; For vacant WBA International middleweight title
41	Win	37–3–1	(Georgia (country)) Nodar Robakidze	PTS	6	30 Jul 2017	Mondo Fitness, Rome, Italy	
40	Loss	36–3–1	(France) Zakaria Attou	UD	12	24 Sep 2016	Salle David Douillet, Chanteloup-les-Vignes, France	For vacant European Union light middleweight title
39	Draw	36–2–1	(France) Zakaria Attou	PTS	12	30 Apr 2016	Palasport, Fiumicino, Italy	For vacant European Union light middleweight title
38	Win	36–2	(Italy) Felice Moncelli	UD	10	27 Jun 2015	Rome, Lazio, Italy	Retained Italian light middleweight title
37	Win	35–2	(Italy) Francesco Di Fiore	SD	10	27 Mar 2015	Palasport, Fiumicino, Italy	Won vacant Italian light middleweight title
36	Win	34–2	(Hungary) Áron Csipak	TKO	3 (6)	17 Oct 2014	Palasport, Sarroch, Italy	
35	Loss	33–2	(Spain) Isaac Real	TKO	8 (12)	17 May 2014	Palafijlkam, Rome, Italy	For vacant European light middleweight title
34	Win	33–1	(Latvia) Semjons Moroseks	UD	6	26 Oct 2013	Palasport ITC, Tortolì, Italy	
33	Win	32–1	(Latvia) Konstantīns Sakara	TKO	5 (6), 1:44	8 Jun 2013	Palasport Pentassuglia, Brindisi, Italy	
32	Win	31–1	(Lithuania) Arvydas Trizno	PTS	6	15 Dec 2012	PalaGarda, Riva del Garda, Italy	
31	Win	30–1	(Nicaragua) Ronny McField	UD	10	19 Sep 2012	Stazione Birra, Ciampino, Italy	
30	Win	29–1	(England) Nasser Al Harbi	UD	12	16 Jun 2012	Stabilimento Oasi, Rome, Italy	Retained WBC International light middleweight title
29	Win	28–1	(Hungary) József Matolcsi	UD	12	18 Nov 2011	Bocciodromo Comunale, Sant'Angelo in Vado, Italy	Retained WBC International light middleweight title
28	Win	27–1	(Poland) Daniel Urbański	UD	12	3 Jun 2011	Pomezia, Lazio, Italy	Retained WBC International light middleweight title
27	Win	26–1	(Lithuania) Tadas Jonkus	TKO	3 (6)	27 Apr 2011	Rome, Lazio, Italy	
26	Win	25–1	(Tunisia) Ayoub Nefzi	TD	8 (12)	17 Dec 2010	Palasport V.le Tiziano, Rome, Italy	Unanimous TD; Won vacant WBC International light middleweight title
25	Win	24–1	(Hungary) Sándor Ramocsa	PTS	8	30 Jul 2010	Pomezia, Lazio, Italy	
24	Win	23–1	(Hungary) József Matolcsi	PTS	6	26 Jun 2010	Rome, Lazio, Italy	
23	Loss	22–1	(Germany) Sebastian Zbik	SD	12	19 Dec 2009	Sport and Congress Center, Schwerin, Germany	For WBC interim middleweight title
22	Win	22–0	(France) Ibrahim Sid	PTS	8	24 Jul 2009	Fiumicino, Lazio, Italy	
21	Win	21–0	(Slovakia) Robert Blažo	PTS	6	6 Jun 2009	Pomezia, Lazio, Italy	
20	Win	20–0	(France) Sebastien Spengler	PTS	6	16 May 2009	Gran Teatro, Rome, Italy	
19	Win	19–0	(Czech Republic) Patrik Hruška	PTS	6	21 Nov 2008	Palasport, Nuvolera, Brescia, Italy	
18	Win	18–0	(Czech Republic) Attila Kiss	PTS	6	28 Aug 2008	Lungolago Zanardelli, Toscolano Maderno, Italy	
17	Win	17–0	(Italy) Italo Brussolo	SD	8	5 Jul 2008	Palasport, Fiumicino, Italy	
16	Win	16–0	(Uganda) Hassan Saku	PTS	8	24 Apr 2008	Fiumicino, Lazio, Italy	
15	Win	15–0	(Belgium) Kobe Vandekerkhove	PTS	10	14 Feb 2008	Palasport, Fiumicino, Italy	
14	Win	14–0	(Morocco) Hicham Nafil	TKO	6 (8)	14 Dec 2007	Palalottomatica, Rome, Italy	
13	Win	13–0	(Romania) Eugen Stan	PTS	6	12 Oct 2007	Nuvolera, Brescia, Lombardy, Italy	
12	Win	12–0	(Serbia) Bogdan Mitić	TD	11 (12)	8 Jun 2007	Stadio della Pallacorda, Rome, Italy	Majority TD; Won inaugural WBC Mediterranean welterweight title
11	Win	11–0	(Hungary) Antal Kubicsek	PTS	6	2 Mar 2007	Palasport, Rome, Italy	
10	Win	10–0	(Italy) Giuseppe Langella	PTS	6	15 Dec 2006	Tendastrisce, Rome, Italy	
9	Win	9–0	(France) Choukri Yentour	UD	12	4 Aug 2006	Fiumicino, Lazio, Italy	Won vacant IBF International welterweight title
8	Win	8–0	(France) Pascal Sow	TKO	4 (6)	9 Jun 2006	Stadio della Pallacorda, Rome, Italy	
7	Win	7–0	(Germany) Andreas Reimer	PTS	8	25 Mar 2006	Palasport, Rome, Italy	
6	Win	6–0	(Romania) Mugurel Sebe	PTS	6	26 Dec 2005	Palasport, Rome, Italy	
5	Win	5–0	(France) Lionel Saraille	TKO	5 (6)	28 Oct 2005	Rome, Lazio, Italy	
4	Win	4–0	(Bulgaria) Danny Donchev	TKO	1 (6)	24 Sep 2005	Palestra BBT, Rome, Italy	
3	Win	3–0	(Belarus) Aliaksandr Zhuk	TKO	4 (6)	8 Jul 2005	Foro Italico, Rome, Italy	
2	Win	2–0	(Romania) Vasile Ene	TKO	3 (6)	14 May 2005	BBT Gym, Rome, Italy	
1	Win	1–0	(Romania) Robert Cristea	TKO	3 (6)	19 Mar 2005	PalaLuiss, Rome, Italy	

== Titles Held ==
- WBC International light middleweight title (2010/2011/2012)
- IBF International welterweight title (2006)
- WBC Mediterranean welterweight title (2007)
- challenger for the WBC interim middleweight title (2009)
- challenger for the EBU light middleweight title (2013)
