= Pedro Meoqui =

City in the Mexican state of Chihuahua

Pedro Meoqui Meoqui
- City
- Location in Mexico
- Coordinates: 28°16′20″N 105°28′55″W
- Country: Mexico
- State: Chihuahua
- Municipality: Meoqui

Population (2010)
  - Total: 22,574

Pedro Meoqui is a city named after General Pedro Meoqui and is the seat of the municipality of Meoqui, in the northern Mexican state of Chihuahua. As of 2010, the municipality had a total population of 22,574, up from 21,306 as of 2005.

== History ==
The community of Meoqui was founded as a Franciscan mission town in the mid-seventeenth century. Was Fray Andrés Ramírez, a Franciscan missionary, the recognized founder of Meoqui, arrived from San Antonio de Julimes as part of a larger effort to Christianize the Indians along the San Pedro River and began the development of the area along the San Pedro River, then inhabited by indigenous Conchos, Julimes, Navichames and Mezquites. The region was subject to the rule of the regional military presidios from the end of the 17th Century until 1773, when the Military Presidio of San Pablo was established.

In 1771, Irish soldier and commander Hugo O'Conor, who had served in the Spanish Royal Army since 1750 and had distinguished himself as a military strategist in several of the Spanish colonies, was appointed Captain and assigned to the northern frontier of New Spain. On January 20, 1773, he was promoted to Colonel and appointed Commandant Inspector of Presidios for all of Nueva Viscaya. In 1773, Colonel O'Conor established the home base of his garrison, the 4th Flying Company, in the area, establishing the Presidio of San Pablo. From there, he led multiple campaigns further north in 1775 and 1776 to establish Spanish control over the area and pushing the Apaches further west. O’Conor and the Presidio commanders who followed him ruled the area politically until 1826, when the Presidio came under the political jurisdiction of San Jerónimo and began to function as an Ayuntamiento (town). In 1837 the town became part of the Rosales Subprefecture, ten years after the Rosales Canton was established. In 1886, the town was integrated into the Canton of Meoqui, and from 1887 to 1911 was part of the Camargo District.

The name of the community and the surrounding municipality, adopted in 1866, is in honor of General Pedro Meoqui Mañon, a military leader from the city of Mexico. He participated in the Puebla campaign in Nueva México with Ignacio Comonfort; during the War of Reform he was active in the conservative ranks and participated in their Intervention. In 1864, when Meoqui Mañon was a colonel, he escorted Benito Juárez from Monterrey to Chihuahua, passing through the community en route. In 1866, Juárez returned to the community and decided to consecrate the community - a town located about an hour from the state capital of Chihuahua - as the Villa of General Pedro Meoqui Mañón (colloquially referred to as "Meoqui") on December 11 as a tribute to his faithful friend who was cruelly murdered on August 8, 1865, in Hidalgo del Parral in the Battle of Parral against the French invasors.

In 1966, the town of Meoqui acquired the designation of City.

== Characteristics and land use ==
The dominant soils in the municipality are Haplic Yermosols in its central portion, with medium texture and level or broken slopes, and with associations of lithosols and / or eutrophic regosols, luvic, with inclusions of rendzinas and / or solonetzs orticos. Land use is mainly agricultural and livestock. In terms of land tenure, private property is first with 29,362 hectares, equivalent to 58.72% of the total land area; Secondly, community-use (ejidal) agricultural property consists of 10,903 hectares, representing 21.78% of the land area and distributed across three ejidos. Urban development consists of 846 hectares or 1.69% of the total land area.

== The Monitos of Meoqui ==
On October 27, 1987, several children claimed to see small humanoid beings leave the earth. This news made the City of Meoqui the focus of international attention. Thus emerged the urban legend of the Monitos of Meoqui.

== Local Industry ==
An important part of the local identity of Meoqui is represented by the bottling of soft drinks at the former Coca-Cola complex of Meoqui, which still produces flavored drinks unique in the country, including the famous Apple Soda of Chihuahua (Manzanita Soto de Chihuahua).

== Gastronomy ==
The local gastronomy is similar to that of other places in the center of the state of Chihuahua but is characterized especially by the so-called Morelian tacos that are found in the center of the city. The abigeo stew is another distinguished dish, made with dried meat and red chili sauce originated by Col. Lázaro Cárdenas.

== Notable people ==
Eduardo Najera - Basketball Player

Alex Saucedo - Boxer

Ismael Zambada Garcia - Drug lord
