= Julio César Chávez Jr. vs. Peter Manfredo Jr. =

Boxing match

- Date: 19 November 2011
- Venue: Reliant Arena, Houston, Texas, U.S.
- Title(s) on the line: WBC middleweight championship

Tale of the tape
Boxer	(Mexico) Julio César Chávez Jr.	(United States) Peter Manfredo Jr.
Nickname	"La Leyenda Continua"	"The Pride of Providence"
Hometown	Culiacan, Sinaloa, Mexico	Providence, Rhode Island, U.S.
Pre-fight record	43–0–1 (1) (30 KO)	37–6 (20 KO)
Age	25 years, 9 months	30 years, 11 months
Height	6 ft 1 in (185 cm)	5 ft 10 in (178 cm)
Weight	159 3/4 lb (72 kg)	159 1/2 lb (72 kg)
Style	Orthodox	Orthodox
Recognition	WBC; Middleweight Champion	WBC; No. 4 Ranked Middleweight

Result
- Chávez defeats Manfredo by 5th round TKO.

Julio César Chávez Jr. vs. Peter Manfredo Jr. was a Middleweight championship fight for the WBC world title. The fight took place in the Reliant Arena in Houston, Texas on November 19, 2011.

Chavez wanted to fight a September tuneup against Ronald Hearns ahead of his November title defense, but he injured his right hand and needed time to heal. Chavez Jr. defended his middleweight belt for the first time against Manfredo Jr.

== Background ==
=== Chavez ===
Chavez claimed a 160-pound belt by majority decision against Sebastian Zbik in Los Angeles on June 4. Chavez was due to make his first defense in his hometown of Culiacan, Mexico, on September 17 against Ronald Hearns, the son of all-time great Thomas Hearns. However, Chavez withdrew from the bout about three weeks ahead of time claiming that a laceration on his hand caused by a ceiling fan had not fully healed.

Even before the Hearns fight was scheduled, Arum had an HBO date waiting for Chavez to face Manfredo on November 19.

=== Manfredo ===
Manfredo, a star on the first season of "The Contender" reality series, got his second shot at a world title. In 2007, he traveled to Wales to challenge super middleweight champion Joe Calzaghe and was stopped in the third round as he was overpowered by a bigger man in a fight that ended with a somewhat quick stoppage. Later in 2007, Manfredo dropped a decision to former super middleweight titlist Jeff Lacy in a fight that was within Manfredo's grasp in the late rounds. The following year, Manfredo, fighting in front of his hometown crowd at the Dunkin Donuts Center in Providence, Rhode Island, was blown out by rugged Sakio Bika in three rounds in a humbling experience.

After the loss, Manfredo considered himself retired and was resigned to working as a laborer, sweeping floors at the same arena where he had starred.

== Undercard ==
Confirmed bouts:

- Middleweight Championship (Mexico) Julio César Chávez Jr. (c) vs. (United States) Peter Manfredo Jr.
  - Chávez defeats Manfredo via Technical Knockout at 1:52 of the fifth round.

=== Preliminary card ===
- Middleweight bout (Ghana) Joshua Clottey vs. (United States) Calvin Green
  - Clottey defeats Green via Technical Knockout at 1:56 of the second round.
- Super Welterweight bout (Mexico) José Pinzón vs. (United States) Larry Smith
- Lightweight bout (United States) Mickey Bey Jr. vs. (Mexico) Héctor Velázquez
  - Bey defeats Velázquez via Unanimous Decision. (78-73, 77-74, 77-75)
- Welterweight bout (Nigeria) Wale Omotoso vs. (United States) Lanardo Tyner
  - Bey defeats Velázquez via Unanimous Decision. (79-73, 78-74)
- Light Heavyweight bout (United States) Marcus Johnson vs. (United States) Billy Bailey
  - Johnson defeats Bailey via Unanimous Decision. (60-53, 60-53, 60-52)
- Featherweight bout (United States) Luis Zarazua vs. (Mexico) Ricardo Avila
  - Zarazua defeats Avila via Unanimous Decision. (40-36, 40-36, 40-36)
- Super Featherweight bout (United States) Gino Escamilla vs. (Puerto Rico) Ivan Otero
  - Otero defeats Avila via Majority Decision. (36-40, 37-39, 38-38)
- Welterweight bout (United States) Cedric Sheppard vs. (United States) Alex Saucedo
  - Saucedo defeats Sheppard via Technical Knockout at 2:28 of the first round.

== International broadcasting ==
Country	Broadcaster
Romania	Digi Sport
United States	HBO

Preceded by vs. Sebastian Zbik	Julio César Chávez Jr.'s bouts 19 November 2011	Succeeded by vs. Marco Antonio Rubio
Preceded by vs. Daniel Edouard	Peter Manfredo Jr.'s bouts 19 November 2011	Succeeded by vs. Rayco Saunders
