= Oyewale =

Nigerian given name

- Gender: Male
- Language: Yoruba

Origin
- Origin: Yoruba
- Meaning: "Honour has come home"
- Region of origin: South-west Nigeria

Other names
- Short forms: Oye, Wale
- Related names: Oyewole; Oyelade; Oyeniyi; Oyewumi; Oyediran; Oyetola; Oyedepo

Oyewale is a masculine Nigerian name primarily used among the Yoruba people. It is a compound of the Yoruba words "Oye," meaning "title" or "honour," and "Wale," meaning "has come home," the name translates to "honour has come home." Morphologically written as "Oyèwálé," it is also used as a surname.

== Notable people with the given name ==
- Oyewale Tomori –Nigerian virologist
- Wale Omotoso born as Oyewale Omotoso –Nigerian boxer
