= Félix Trinidad vs. Roy Jones Jr. =

Boxing competition

Bring on the Titans
- Date: January 19, 2008
- Venue: Madison Square Garden, New York City, New York, US

Tale of the tape
Boxer	(Puerto Rico) Félix Trinidad	(United States) Roy Jones Jr.
Nickname	"Tito"	"Junior"
Hometown	Fajardo, San Juan, Puerto Rico	Pensacola, Florida, US
Pre-fight record	42–2 (35 KO)	51–4 (38 KO)
Age	35 years	39 years
Height	5 ft 11 in (180 cm)	5 ft 11 in (180 cm)
Weight	170 lb (77 kg)	169 1/2 lb (77 kg)
Style	Orthodox	Orthodox
Recognition	3-division world champion	WBA/WBO; No. 2 Ranked Light Heavyweight; IBF; No. 9 Ranked Light Heavyweight; WBC; No. 10 Ranked Light Heavyweight; 4-division world champion

Result
- Jones Jr. wins via 12-round unanimous decision (117-109, 116-110 and 116-110)

Félix Trinidad vs. Roy Jones Jr., billed as Bring on the Titans, was a professional boxing match contested on January 19, 2008. The non-title bout was fought with a catch weight of 170 pounds.

== Background ==
In August 2007, promoter Don King announced a "dream match" between Félix Trinidad and Roy Jones Jr. with a date set for January 19, 2008. Both men had become two of the most decorated fighters in boxing history, with Trinidad sporting a 42–2 record having won titles in the welterweight, light middleweight and middleweight divisions, while Jones was 51–4 and had won titles in four different divisions; middleweight, super middleweight, light heavyweight and heavyweight. However, the now 35-year-old Trinidad had been out of boxing for two and a half years after losing a lopsided decision to Ronald "Winky" Wright in May 2005. The 39-year-old Jones, meanwhile, had lost three consecutive fights in 2004 and 2005 and though he had won his two previous fights in dominating fashion, they had been against lightly-regarded opponents in Prince Badi Ajamu and Anthony Hanshaw. Nevertheless, the two fighters and King heavily promoted the bout as "legend vs. legend" with King declaring the upcoming bout "the most remarkable thing out of my 40-year career." The fight was held with a catch weight of 170 pounds, becoming Trinidad's first and only fight in the light heavyweight division.

== The Fight ==
Trinidad began the fight aggressively and won some of the early rounds while also throwing 552 punches during the course of the fight. However, Trinidad struggled to penetrate Jones' trademark defense and only landed 160 of his thrown punches for a 29% success rate. Jones, meanwhile, landed 172 of his 482 thrown punches for a 36% success rate. Jones also managed to score two knockdowns of Trinidad. With just under a minute gone by in the seventh round, Jones landed a short right hook to Trinidad's head that sent him to the canvas. Trinidad was able to get back to his feet at the count of eight, but was clearly dazed from the punch. Jones aggressively pursued Trinidad for the remainder of the round in an attempt to secure the knockout victory, but Trinidad was able to avoid Jones' attempts and survived the remainder of the round. Following the seventh round, Jones seized control of the fight and won the remaining five rounds on the scorecards. In the tenth round, Jones scored another knockdown over Trinidad late in the round after landing a quick left–right hand combination, though Trinidad quickly got back up and survived the remainder of the fight. The judge's scorecards were one-sided in favor of Jones, who won by unanimous decision with one score 117–109 and two scores of 116–110.

== Aftermath ==
The fight was a box-office success, securing 500,000 pay-per-view buys and earning $25 million in pay-per-view revenue. For Jones it was the second highest-grossing pay-per-view in his career, behind only his heavyweight title bout against John Ruiz.

The fight was the last of Trinidad's career. Trinidad was inactive for nearly two years as he contemplated whether or not to return to the ring before announcing in October 2009 that he was between 95 and 98 percent sure he was done with boxing.

Jones used his impressive victory to secure a high-profile match with the undefeated Joe Calzaghe, who was coming off a victory over Bernard Hopkins that made him The Ring light heavyweight champion. Calzaghe dominated the fight, earning a unanimous decision with three scores of 118–109.

== Undercard ==
Confirmed bouts:

== Broadcasting ==
Country	Broadcaster
Australia	Main Event
Ireland & United Kingdom	Setanta Sport
Poland	TVP 2
United States	HBO

Preceded by vs. Anthony Hanshaw	Roy Jones Jr.'s bouts January 19, 2008	Succeeded by vs. Joe Calzaghe
Preceded by vs. Winky Wright	Félix Trinidad's bouts January 19, 2008	Retired
