= Alex Saucedo =

American boxer

Personal information
- Nickname: El Cholo
- Nationality: American
- Born: Juan Alejandro Saucedo Ortiz; June 24, 1994 (age 32) Meoqui, Chihuahua, Mexico
- Height: 5 ft 10 in (178 cm)
- Weight: Light welterweight; Welterweight

Boxing career
- Reach: 72 in (183 cm)
- Stance: Orthodox

Boxing record
- Total fights: 32
- Wins: 30
- Win by KO: 19
- Losses: 2

Juan Alejandro Saucedo Ortiz (born June 24, 1994) is a Mexican-born American former professional boxer who competed from 2011 to 2020. He challenged for the WBO light welterweight title in 2018. At regional level he held the WBO-NABO and WBO International light welterweight titles between 2017 and 2018.

== Professional career ==
Saucedo made his professional debut on November 19, 2011, scoring a first-round technical knockout (TKO) victory over Cedric Sheppard at the Reliant Arena in Houston, Texas.

After compiling a record of 25–0 (15 KOs) he faced Gustavo David Vittori for the vacant WBA-NABA (USA) and WBO-NABO light welterweight titles on November 11, 2017, at the Save Mart Center in Fresno, California. After suffering a cut above his left eye from an accidental clash of heads in the second round, Saucedo upped the pressure in the third to score three knockdowns; left hooks twice sent Vittori to the canvas on one knee, with the end coming after another left hook sent him crashing to the canvas, prompting the referee to wave off the fight and award Saucedo the WBA and WBO regional titles via third-round knockout (KO). He defended the titles in his next fight, facing Abner López on March 10, 2018, at the StubHub Center in Carson, California. In a closely contested fight Saucedo retained his titles with a seventh-round KO after dropping López with a left hook to the body.

For his next fight he dropped the WBO-NABO title in an attempt to add the vacant WBO International title to his collection, facing Lenny Zappavigna on June 30, 2018, at the Chesapeake Energy Arena in Oklahoma City. During a gruelling and bloody fight in which both men received cuts – Saucedo over his left eye and Zappavigna over both – Saucedo scored a knockdown in the third round en route to a seventh-round TKO after Zappavigna's corner threw in the towel with 29 seconds left of the round. At the time of the stoppage Saucedo was ahead on the scorecards, with two judges scoring the bout 59–54 while the third scored it 58–55.

Following his win over Zappavigna, Saucedo became the mandatory challenger for the WBO light welterweight champion, Maurice Hooker. The pair squared off on November 16, 2018, at the Chesapeake Energy Arena. Both fighters started the bout with intent; Saucedo moving forward with aggression as Hooker remained on the outside to box at range. Saucedo scored a heavy knockdown in round two, knocking the champion to the canvas with a right hand. Hooker rose to his feet but was visibly hurt, allowing Saucedo to pound away with right hands and uppercuts, leaving the champion with a bloodied nose at the end of the round. Hooker recovered from the knockdown in the next round, sticking behind his trademark jab and landing punches as Saucedo tried to get on the inside. Saucedo found success in the fifth round as he backed the champion onto the ropes, switching his attacks from head to body. Hooker fired back in the final seconds of the round to knock Saucedo off balance. Hooker upped the pressure in the sixth, landing clean punches which began to mark Saucedo's face, causing swelling to his left eye. The pressure continued in the seventh; Hooker landed a right hand which sent Saucedo stumbling into the ropes, prompting referee Mark Nelson to rule it a knockdown and initiate a standing eight count as he deemed the ropes kept Saucedo on his feet. Following Nelson's count, Saucedo was met with a flurry of punches which sent him stumbling across the ring, prompting Nelson to wave off the fight, awarding Hooker a seventh-round TKO victory. At the time of the stoppage Saucedo was losing on the scorecards with two judges scoring the bout 57–56 and the third scoring it 58–55, all in favour of Hooker. According to CompuBox stats, Saucedo landed 133 out of 486 (27%) punches and Hooker landed 174 out of 509 (34%).

After a year out of the ring he came back in November 2019 to defeat Rod Salka via first-round KO in a scheduled eight-round bout.

== Professional boxing record ==
32 fights	30 wins	2 losses
By knockout	19	1
By decision	11	1

No.	Result	Record	Opponent	Type	Round, time	Date	Location	Notes
32	Loss	30–2	Arnold Barboza Jr.	UD	10	Oct 17, 2020	MGM Grand Conference Center, Paradise, Nevada, U.S.	For vacant WBO International light welterweight title
31	Win	30–1	Sonny Fredrickson	UD	10	Jun 30, 2020	MGM Grand Conference Center, Paradise, Nevada, U.S.	
30	Win	29–1	Rod Salka	KO	1 (8), 2:17	Nov 2, 2019	Dignity Health Sports Park, Carson, California, U.S.	
29	Loss	28–1	Maurice Hooker	TKO	7 (12), 1:26	Nov 16, 2018	Chesapeake Energy Arena, Oklahoma City, Oklahoma, U.S.	For WBO light welterweight title
28	Win	28–0	Lenny Zappavigna	TKO	7 (10), 2:31	Jun 30, 2018	Chesapeake Energy Arena, Oklahoma City, Oklahoma, U.S.	Retained WBA-NABA (USA) light welterweight title; Won vacant WBO International light welterweight title
27	Win	27–0	Abner López	TKO	7 (10), 1:17	Mar 10, 2018	StubHub Center, Carson, California, U.S.	Retained WBA-NABA (USA), and WBO-NABO light welterweight titles
26	Win	26–0	Gustavo David Vittori	KO	3 (10), 1:16	Nov 11, 2017	Save Mart Arena, Fresno, California, U.S.	Won vacant WBA-NABA (USA) and WBO-NABO light welterweight titles
25	Win	25–0	Wilberth Lopez	UD	8	May 26, 2017	UIC Pavilion, Chicago, Illinois, U.S.	
24	Win	24–0	Johnny Garcia	TKO	2 (8), 2:42	Mar 17, 2017	Hulu Theater, New York City, New York, U.S.	
23	Win	23–0	Raymond Serrano	UD	8	Nov 4, 2016	Treasure Island Casino, Paradise, Nevada, U.S.	
22	Win	22–0	Claudinei Lacerda	UD	8	May 21, 2016	Laredo Energy Arena, Laredo, Texas, U.S.	
21	Win	21–0	Clarence Booth	UD	8	Feb 13, 2016	Sportsmans Lodge, Studio City, California, U.S.	
20	Win	20–0	Martín Ángel Martínez	UD	6	Oct 24, 2015	CenturyLink Center, Omaha, Nebraska, U.S.	
19	Win	19–0	Edgar Ortega	TKO	3 (10), 2:15	Aug 8, 2015	Municipal Gym, Meoqui, Mexico	
18	Win	18–0	Jake Giuriceo	TKO	3 (8), 0:49	May 30, 2015	Florentine Gardens, Los Angeles, California, U.S.	
17	Win	17–0	Eduardo Flores	TKO	3 (8), 2:05	Feb 7, 2015	State Farm Arena, Hidalgo, U.S.	
16	Win	16–0	Daniel Calzada	UD	6	Nov 29, 2014	CenturyLink Center, Omaha, Nebraska, U.S.	
15	Win	15–0	Miguel Alvarez	KO	2 (8), 0:31	Sep 27, 2014	OKC Downtown Airpak, Oklahoma City, Oklahoma, U.S.	
14	Win	14–0	Gary Bergeron	TKO	3 (6), 1:35	Sep 6, 2014	Laredo Energy Arena, Laredo, Texas, U.S.	
13	Win	13–0	Gilbert Venegas	UD	6	Mar 1, 2014	Alamodome, San Antonio, Texas, U.S.	
12	Win	12–0	Francisco Reza	TKO	1 (6), 2:10	Feb 1, 2014	Laredo Energy Arena, Laredo, Texas, U.S.	
11	Win	11–0	Steve Hall	TKO	3 (6), 0:11	Nov 9, 2013	American Bank Center, Corpus Christi, Texas, U.S.	
10	Win	10–0	Alexis Pena	KO	1 (6), 1:00	Aug 17, 2013	Laredo Energy Arena, Laredo, Texas, U.S.	
9	Win	9–0	Boyd Henley	UD	4	Jun 29, 2013	WinStar World Casino, Thackerville, Oklahoma, U.S.	
8	Win	8–0	Norman Allen	TKO	2 (6), 1:40	Mar 16, 2013	WinStar World Casino, Thackerville, Oklahoma, U.S.	
7	Win	7–0	Eddie Cordova	TKO	3 (4), 2:14	Dec 15, 2012	Toyota Center, Houston, Texas, U.S.	
6	Win	6–0	Terrence Harris	TKO	2 (4), 2:12	Oct 11, 2012	Remington Park, Oklahoma City, Oklahoma, U.S.	
5	Win	5–0	Donald Ward	MD	4	Aug 11, 2012	Convention Center, Arlington, Texas, U.S.	
4	Win	4–0	James Harrison	UD	4	Jun 16, 2012	Sun Bowl, El Paso, Texas, U.S.	
3	Win	3–0	Luis Alejandro	TKO	1 (4), 1:51	Mar 30, 2012	Civic Center, Aransas Pass, Texas, U.S.	
2	Win	2–0	Jean Colon	KO	1 (4), 1:03	Feb 4, 2012	Alamodome, San Antonio, Texas, U.S.	
1	Win	1–0	Cedric Sheppard	TKO	1 (4), 2:28	Nov 19, 2011	NRG Arena, Houston, Texas, U.S.	

Regional boxing titles
Vacant Title last held by Jose Zepeda	WBO International light welterweight champion June 30 – November 16, 2018; Failed to win world title	Vacant Title next held by Chris Algieri
