= Marco Antonio Rubio =

Mexican boxer

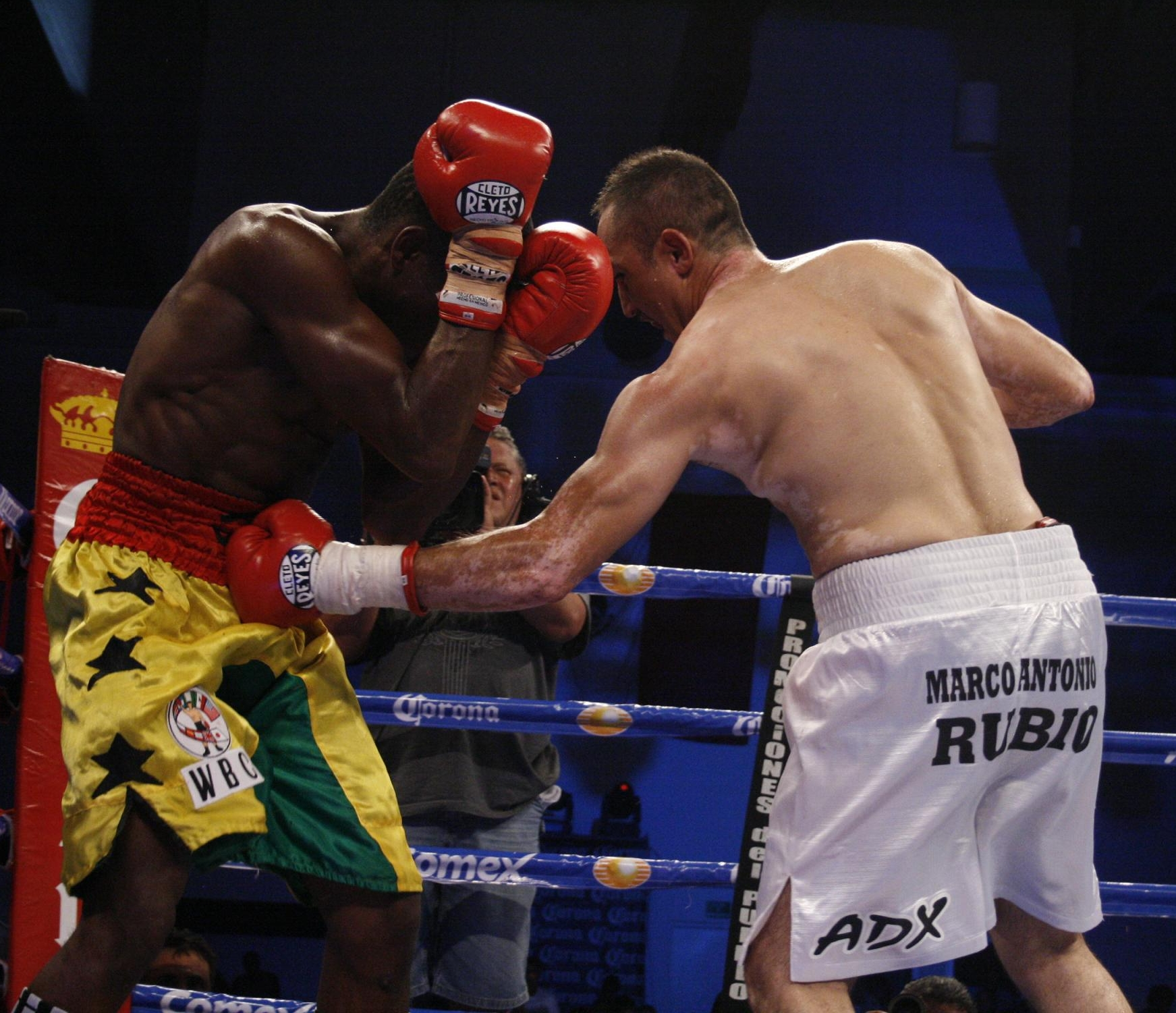
- Rubio (right) vs. Akrong, 2011

Personal information
- Nickname: El Veneno ("The Poison")
- Born: 16 June 1980 (age 46) Torreón, Coahuila, Mexico
- Height: 5 ft 10 in (178 cm)
- Weight: Light middleweight; Middleweight; Super middleweight

Boxing career
- Reach: 70 in (178 cm)
- Stance: Orthodox

Boxing record
- Total fights: 68
- Wins: 59
- Win by KO: 51
- Losses: 8
- Draws: 1

Marco Antonio Rubio (born 16 June 1980) is a Mexican former professional boxer who competed from 2000 to 2015. He held the WBC interim middleweight title in 2014, and challenged thrice for a middleweight world title in 2009, 2012 and 2014.

== Professional career ==
On 21 February 2009, Rubio earned the right to fight for the middleweight title by scoring a split decision victory over Enrique Ornelas to secure the World Boxing Council's # 1 ranking and a shot at the WBC Middleweight title on 18 October 2008, in Atlantic City on the Kelly Pavlik vs. Bernard Hopkins fight card televised portion.

=== Unified and lineal middleweight world title challenge ===
On 21 February 2009, Rubio fought for the unified WBC, WBO, Ring magazine, and lineal middleweight titles against Kelly Pavlik. Before the start of the tenth round, Rubio's corner stopped the fight.

=== Comeback ===
After he was stopped in the ninth round by middleweight champion Kelly Pavlik in February 2009, Rubio went on six-fight winning streak

On 8 April 2011, in the Bell Centre in Montreal, Quebec, Canada, Rubio was featured in the main event of Friday Night Fights. His opponent was David Lemieux, who came to the fight with an undefeated record. Lemieux was the heavy favorite to win in his hometown against the Mexican veteran. During the first five rounds Lemieux dominated Rubio by landing hard power punches. But Rubio refused to quit and wouldn't go down. Rubio came back in round six and started to land harder punches that slowed down Lemieux. In the seventh round Rubio knocked down Lemieux. Lemieux got up, but Rubio continued where he left off and threw more punches at him. With only seconds left in round seven, Lemieux's corner threw in the towel to stop the fight.

By defeating Lemieux, Rubio became the mandatory challenger against the winner of Sebastian Zbik of Germany vs. Mexico's Julio Cesar Chavez Jr. for the WBC middleweight title, which Chavez won.

Rubio made easy work of journeyman Matt Vanda (44–14, 24 KO's) on 16 December 2011, with a 5th-round TKO win at the Mandalay Bay Resort and Casino in Las Vegas, Nevada.

=== WBC middleweight title challenge ===
Rubio faced Mexican countryman Julio César Chávez Jr. in a scheduled 12-round middleweight bout, for the WBC version of the world title, on 4 Feb at the Alamodome in San Antonio, Texas. Chávez Jr. retained the belt, earning a unanimous decision over fellow Mexican Rubio. The judges scored the bout 118–110, 116-112 115-113 for Chávez Jr., which drew a mixed reaction from the 14,120 in attendance at the Alamodome. Neither fighter went down despite taking continuous heavy blows to the head and body throughout the 12-round bout. Chávez Jr. overcame a gutsy performance by Rubio despite having some trouble entering the fight.

== Personal life ==
Rubio currently resides in the Mexican border city of Ciudad Acuña, across from Del Rio, Texas. He has vitiligo.

== Professional boxing record ==
68 fights	59 wins	8 losses
By knockout	51	4
By decision	8	4
Draws	1	

No.	Result	Record	Opponent	Type	Round, time	Date	Location	Notes
68	Loss	59–8–1	Anthony Dirrell	UD	10	6 September 2015	American Bank Center, Corpus Christi, Texas, U.S.	
67	Loss	59–7–1	Gennady Golovkin	KO	2 (12), 1:19	18 October 2014	StubHub Center, Carson, California, U.S.	Lost WBC interim middleweight title; For WBA (Super) and IBO middleweight titles
66	Win	59–6–1	Domenico Spada	KO	10 (12), 1:38	5 April 2014	Gran Estadio, Delicias, Mexico	Won vacant WBC interim middleweight title
65	Win	58–6–1	Dionisio Miranda	KO	2 (12), 2:44	27 July 2013	Palenque de la Feria, Chihuahua City, Mexico	
64	Win	57–6–1	Marcus Upshaw	UD	12	23 March 2013	Centro de Espectáculos "La Macarena", Uruapan, Mexico	
63	Win	56–6–1	Michel Rosales	TKO	11 (12), 1:03	22 December 2012	Auditorio Bicentenario, Morelia, Mexico	Retained WBF (Federation) super middleweight title
62	Win	55–6–1	Carlos Baldomir	RTD	4 (12), 3:00	8 September 2012	Estadio Miguel Alemán Valdés, Celaya, Mexico	Won vacant WBF (Federation) super middleweight title
61	Win	54–6–1	Jorge Cota	TKO	7 (12)	30 June 2012	Auditorio Centenario, Torreón, Mexico	Won vacant IBF International middleweight title
60	Loss	53–6–1	Julio César Chávez Jr.	UD	12	4 Feb 2012	Alamodome, San Antonio, Texas, U.S.	For WBC middleweight title
59	Win	53–5–1	Matt Vanda	TKO	5 (10), 2:42	16 December 2011	Mandalay Bay Events Center, Paradise, Nevada, U.S.	
58	Win	52–5–1	Mohammed Akrong	TKO	5 (12)	3 September 2011	Centro de Convenciones, San Luis Potosí City, Mexico	Won WBC Latino interim middleweight title
57	Win	51–5–1	Ricardo Marcelo Ramallo	TKO	3 (10), 1:36	4 June 2011	Auditorio Centenario, Gómez Palacio, Mexico	
56	Win	50–5–1	David Lemieux	TKO	7 (12), 2:36	8 April 2011	Bell Centre, Montreal, Quebec, Canada	
55	Win	49–5–1	Wilson Santana	TKO	8 (12), 0:45	1 January 2011	Auditorio Centenario, Torreón, Mexico	Won vacant WBC Latino super middleweight title
54	Win	48–5–1	José Luis Zertuche	TKO	6 (12), 1:16	21 August 2010	Inforum, Irapuato, Mexico	Retained WBC Latino middleweight title
53	Win	47–5–1	Samuel Miller	UD	12	12 June 2010	Auditorio Centenario, Gómez Palacio, Mexico	Won vacant WBC Latino middleweight title
52	Win	46–5–1	Jaison Palomeque	TKO	2 (10), 1:55	20 March 2010	The City Discothèque, Cancún, Mexico	
51	Win	45–5–1	Rigoberto Álvarez	TKO	9 (12), 1:32	16 January 2010	Gimnasio Auditorio Centenario, Gómez Palacio, Mexico	Won vacant WBC Latino middleweight title
50	Win	44–5–1	Jose Miguel Rodriguez Berrio	TKO	1 (12)	31 October 2009	Gimnasio Auditorio Centenario, Gómez Palacio, Mexico	Won vacant WBC Latino middleweight title
49	Loss	43–5–1	Kelly Pavlik	RTD	9 (12), 3:00	21 February 2009	Chevrolet Centre, Youngstown, Ohio, U.S.	For WBC, WBO, and The Ring middleweight titles
48	Win	43–4–1	Enrique Ornelas	SD	12	18 Oct 2008	Boardwalk Hall, Atlantic City, New Jersey, U.S.	
47	Win	42–4–1	Alfredo Cuevas	TKO	5 (10), 3:00	6 June 2008	Sovereign Center, Reading, Pennsylvania, U.S.	
46	Win	41–4–1	José Luis Zertuche	TKO	7 (12), 2:22	9 February 2008	Domo de la Feria, León, Mexico	Won vacant WBC FECOMBOX middleweight title
45	Win	40–4–1	Sherwin Davis	KO	2 (10)	1 January 2008	Auditorio Centenario, Gómez Palacio, Mexico	
44	Win	39–4–1	Rogelio Sanchez	KO	1 (10)	19 October 2007	Auditorio Jose de la Fuente, Ciudad Acuña, Mexico	
43	Win	38–4–1	Jorge Dario David Gomez	TKO	3 (12), 2:26	8 June 2007	Auditorio Municipal, Torreón, Mexico	Retained WBA Fedecentro middleweight title
42	Win	37–4–1	Erik Rafael Esquivel	TKO	9 (12)	9 March 2007	Auditorio Municipal, Torreón, Mexico	Won Mexico middleweight title
41	Win	36–4–1	Daniel Stanislavjevic	UD	12	1 January 2007	Auditorio Municipal, Torreón, Mexico	Won vacant WBA Fedecentro middleweight title
40	Win	35–4–1	Octavio Castro	RTD	2 (12), 0:10	17 November 2006	Auditorio Municipal, Torreón, Mexico	
39	Loss	34–4–1	Zaurbek Baysangurov	UD	12	23 September 2006	Palace of Sports, Kyiv, Ukraine	For vacant WBC International light middleweight title
38	Loss	34–3–1	Kassim Ouma	SD	12	6 May 2006	MGM Grand Garden Arena, Paradise, Nevada, U.S.	For WBO–NABO light middleweight title
37	Win	34–2–1	Aslanbek Kodzoev	TKO	8 (10), 0:01	27 January 2006	Cicero Stadium, Cicero, Illinois, U.S.	
36	Win	33–2–1	Anthony Ivory	TKO	1 (10), 2:40	4 November 2005	Auditorio Municipal, Ciudad Acuña, Mexico	
35	Win	32–2–1	Leon Pearson	TKO	4 (10)	19 August 2005	Palenque Vicente Fernandez, Gómez Palacio, Mexico	
34	Win	31–2–1	David Toribio	TKO	2 (10), 1:26	14 July 2005	The Orleans, Paradise, Nevada, U.S.	
33	Win	30–2–1	Grady Brewer	TKO	8 (10), 0:10	20 May 2005	Ector County Coliseum, Odessa, Texas, U.S.	
32	Win	29–2–1	Juan Carlos Candelo	UD	10	10 March 2005	Municipal Auditorium, San Antonio, Texas, U.S.	
31	Win	28–2–1	Frankie Randall	KO	2 (10), 0:59	1 January 2005	Auditorio Municipal, Torreón, Mexico	
30	Loss	27–2–1	Kofi Jantuah	KO	1 (12), 0:33	18 Sep 2004	MGM Grand Garden Arena, Paradise, Nevada, U.S.	Lost WBC International light middleweight title
29	Win	27–1–1	Jeffrey Hill	TKO	7 (12), 0:34	5 August 2004	Dodge Arena, Hidalgo, Texas, U.S.	Won vacant WBO Inter-Continental light middleweight title
28	Win	26–1–1	Fitz Vanderpool	TKO	1 (12)	22 May 2004	Plaza de Toros, Mexico City, Mexico	Retained WBC International light middleweight title
27	Win	25–1–1	Alfred Ankamah	TKO	1 (12), 2:50	1 May 2004	Auditorio Municipal, Torreón, Mexico	Retained WBC International light middleweight title
26	Win	24–1–1	Ramon Mendivil	TKO	1 (10)	1 January 2004	Gómez Palacio, Mexico	
25	Win	23–1–1	Cristian Solano	TKO	1 (12), 2:51	20 November 2003	Palenque Vicente Fernandez, Gómez Palacio, Mexico	Retained WBC International and Mexico light middleweight titles
24	Win	22–1–1	Akhmed Oligov	TKO	1 (12), 0:59	8 October 2003	Luzhniki Stadium, Moscow, Russia	Retained WBC International light middleweight title
23	Win	21–1–1	Jose Varela	KO	2 (12)	1 August 2003	Palenque de la Feria, Gómez Palacio, Mexico	Won vacant WBC International light middleweight title
22	Win	20–1–1	Calvin Odom	TKO	1 (10), 2:50	27 June 2003	Palenque de Gallos, Gómez Palacio, Mexico	
21	Win	19–1–1	Jesus Arce	KO	1 (12)	16 May 2003	Palenque de Gallos, Ciudad Acuña, Mexico	Retained Mexico light middleweight title
20	Win	18–1–1	Jesus Mendoza	TKO	1 (12)	21 March 2003	Palenque de la Expo Feria, Ciudad Acuña, Mexico	Retained Mexico light middleweight title
19	Win	17–1–1	Paulino Avitia	KO	1 (12)	21 February 2003	Gómez Palacio, Mexico	Retained Mexico light middleweight title
18	Win	16–1–1	Saúl Román	TKO	4 (12)	1 January 2003	El Palenque, Gómez Palacio, Mexico	Retained Mexico light middleweight title
17	Win	15–1–1	Norberto Sandoval	KO	2 (12)	25 October 2002	Ciudad Acuña, Mexico	Retained Mexico light middleweight title
16	Win	14–1–1	Javier Santibanez	TKO	2 (12)	6 September 2002	Ciudad Acuña, Mexico	Won vacant Mexico light middleweight title
15	Win	13–1–1	Luis Enrique Delgado	KO	1 (10)	19 July 2002	Ciudad Acuña, Mexico	Won vacant Coahuila light middleweight title
14	Win	12–1–1	Jorge Vaca	TKO	4	17 May 2002	Auditorio Benito Juarez, Los Mochis, Mexico	
13	Draw	11–1–1	Julio César de la Cruz	PTS	8	22 March 2002	Mazatlán, Mexico	
12	Win	11–1	Roberto Urias	KO	2	1 January 2002	Mexico	
11	Win	10–1	Richard Ruiz	PTS	4	9 November 2001	Mexico	
10	Win	9–1	Antonio Garcia	TKO	1	21 September 2001	Mexico	
9	Win	8–1	Eduardo Jacques	PTS	10	18 September 2001	Gómez Palacio, Mexico	
8	Win	7–1	Ismael Diaz	KO	4	13 July 2001	Mexico	
7	Loss	6–1	Saúl Román	TKO	2	1 June 2001	Mexico	
6	Win	6–0	Raul Martinez	KO	1	1 May 2001	Mexico	
5	Win	5–0	Antonio Mora	KO	3	1 January 2001	Mexico	
4	Win	4–0	Jorge Sandoval	KO	4	20 November 2000	Mexico	
3	Win	3–0	Lino Torres	KO	3	15 September 2000	Mexico	
2	Win	2–0	Gonzalo Bonilla	KO	2	4 August 2000	Mexico	
1	Win	1–0	Alberto Juarez	PTS	4	17 May 2000	Monterrey, Mexico	

Sporting positions
Regional boxing titles
Vacant Title last held by Quirino Garcia	Mexico light middleweight champion 6 September 2002 – March 2004; Vacated	Vacant Title next held by Saúl Román
Vacant Title last held by Mihály Kótai	WBC International light middleweight champion 1 August 2003 – 18 September 2004	Succeeded by Kofi Jantuah
Vacant Title last held by Serhiy Dzyndzyruk	WBO Inter-Continental light middleweight champion 5 August 2004 – 18 September 2004; Lost eliminator for world title	Vacant Title next held by Gotthard Hinteregger
Vacant Title last held by Cleiton Conceição	WBA Fedecentro middleweight champion 1 January 2007 – February 2008; Vacated	Vacant Title next held by Nilson Julio Tapia
Preceded by Erik Rafael Esquivel	Mexico middleweight champion 9 March 2007 – March 2008; Vacated	Vacant Title next held by Ruben Padilla
Vacant Title last held by Martin Avila	WBC FECOMBOX middleweight champion 9 February 2008 – 21 February 2009; Lost bid for world title	Vacant Title next held by Marcos Reyes
Vacant Title last held by Jorge Sebastian Heiland	WBC Latino middleweight champion 31 October 2009 – November 2009; Vacated	Vacant Title next held by Jorge Sebastian Heiland
Vacant Title last held by Jorge Sebastian Heiland	WBC Latino middleweight champion 16 January 2010 – March 2010; Vacated	Vacant Title next held by Jorge Sebastian Heiland
Vacant Title last held by Jorge Sebastian Heiland	WBC Latino middleweight champion 12 June 2010 – October 2010; Vacated	Vacant Title next held by Claudio Ariel Abalos
Vacant Title last held by Alexander Brand	WBC Latino super middleweight champion 1 January 2011 – February 2011; Vacated	Vacant Title next held by Pablo Oscar Natalio Farias
New title	WBC Latino middleweight champion Interim title 3 September 2011 – 4 February 2012; Lost bid for world title	Vacant Title next held by Billi Facundo Godoy
Vacant Title last held by Predrag Radosevic	IBF International middleweight champion 30 June 2012 – September 2012; Vacated	Vacant Title next held by Predrag Radosevic
Minor world boxing titles
Vacant Title last held by William Gare	WBF (Federation) super middleweight champion 8 September 2012 – March 2013; Vacated	Vacant Title next held by Francis Cheka
Major world boxing titles
Vacant Title last held by Sebastian Zbik	WBC middleweight champion Interim title 5 April 2014 – 17 October 2014; Stripped	Vacant Title next held by Gennady Golovkin
