= Joe Calzaghe vs. Roy Jones Jr. =

Boxing competition

Battle of the Superpowers
- Date: November 8, 2008
- Venue: Madison Square Garden, New York City, New York, U.S.
- Title on the line: The Ring light heavyweight title

Tale of the tape
Boxer	Joe Calzaghe	Roy Jones Jr.
Nickname	Pride of Wales	Junior
Hometown	Newbridge, Wales	Pensacola, Florida, U.S.
Purse	$10,000,000	$10,000,000
Pre-fight record	45–0 (32 KO)	52–4 (38 KO)
Age	36 years, 7 months	39 years, 9 months
Height	6 ft 0 in (183 cm)	5 ft 11 in (180 cm)
Weight	174 1/2 lb (79 kg)	174 1/2 lb (79 kg)
Style	Southpaw	Orthodox
Recognition	The Ring; Light Heavyweight Champion; WBC; No. 1 Ranked Light Heavyweight; The Ring No. 3 ranked pound-for-pound fighter 2-division world champion	WBO; No. 1 Ranked Light Heavyweight; WBA/IBF; No. 2 Ranked Light Heavyweight; WBC; No. 5 Ranked Light Heavyweight; The Ring; No. 6 Ranked Light Heavyweight; 4-division world champion

Result
- Calzaghe wins via 12-round unanimous decision (118–109, 118–109, 118–109)

Joe Calzaghe vs. Roy Jones Jr., billed as Battle of the Superpowers, was a professional boxing match contested on November 8, 2008, for The Ring Light heavyweight championship.

It ultimately proved to be Calzaghe's final professional bout, as he announced his retirement on February 5, 2009.

== Background ==
After Calzaghe's split-decision points victory over Bernard Hopkins (see Bernard Hopkins vs. Joe Calzaghe), and Jones's victory over Félix Trinidad, the two signed to fight each other for the Ring magazine light-heavyweight championship of the world. After having been originally scheduled for September 20, 2008, the fight was rescheduled when Calzaghe injured his wrist in training. The bout was then rescheduled for November 8, 2008. The fight received considerable media coverage, including the HBO pre-publicity series, 24/7, in three episodes.

== The fight ==
The fight did not start well for Calzaghe, who was knocked down in the first round. Replays showed the knockdown was caused by an accidental forearm by Jones (a two-punch combination). However, he composed himself and went out strong in the third round. In round 6 Jones landed a thunderous uppercut that had the crowd on their feet. But in round seven Calzaghe opened a cut above Jones's left eye. Jones was clearly having difficulty as the blood completely impaired his vision. Essentially Calzaghe remained dominant and in control, something that was reflected in the judges' scorecards as he outclassed Jones. The fight continued all the way to the end of the twelfth round, when all three judges awarded Calzaghe the UD win by a wide margin, each scoring the fight 118–109. Unofficial scorecards from media ringsiders ranged from 118–109 to 117–110 in Calzaghe's favour.

== Aftermath ==
After the fight there were calls for Calzaghe to retire at the top. Former heavyweight champion Lennox Lewis felt that Calzaghe had nothing left to prove in the world of boxing. Ricky Hatton and David Haye echoed this view by saying there was nothing more Joe could achieve, though double light-heavyweight champion Chad Dawson challenged the champion to one last fight before he retired. In the end, Calzaghe chose to retire, telling the BBC,

It was a difficult decision but I have achieved everything I wanted to achieve in boxing. I've been world champion for 11 years. I've got no other goals to go for. That's why I am calling it a day.

Joe was also challenged by the then undefeated British boxer Carl Froch.

== Undercard ==
Confirmed bouts:

== Broadcasting ==
Country	Broadcaster
Australia	Main Event
Hungary	Sport 1
Poland	Polsat
United Kingdom	Setanta Sports
United States	HBO

Preceded by vs. Bernard Hopkins	Joe Calzaghe's bouts 8 November 2008	Retired
Preceded by vs. Félix Trinidad	Roy Jones Jr.'s bouts 8 November 2008	Succeeded by vs. Omar Sheika
