= Kelly Pavlik vs. Bernard Hopkins =

Boxing match

Unstoppable
- Date: October 18, 2008
- Venue: Boardwalk Hall Atlantic City, New Jersey, U.S.

Tale of the tape
Boxer	Kelly Pavlik	Bernard Hopkins
Nickname	"The Ghost"	"The Executioner"
Hometown	Youngstown, Ohio, U.S.	Philadelphia, Pennsylvania, U.S.
Pre-fight record	34–0 (30 KO)	48–5–1 (1) (32 KO)
Age	26 years, 6 months	43 years, 9 months
Height	6 ft 2 in (188 cm)	6 ft 1 in (185 cm)
Weight	169 lb (77 kg)	170 lb (77 kg)
Style	Orthodox	Orthodox
Recognition	WBC, WBO and The Ring; Middleweight Champion; The Ring No. 7 ranked pound-for-pound fighter	WBO; No. 2 Ranked Light Heavyweight; The Ring; No. 1 Ranked Light Heavyweight; The Ring No. 4 ranked pound-for-pound fighter 2-division world champion

Result
- Hopkins wins via 12-round unanimous decision (119-106, 118-108, 117-109)

Kelly Pavlik vs. Bernard Hopkins, billed as Unstoppable, was a professional boxing match contested on October 18, 2008 at Boardwalk Hall in Atlantic City, New Jersey.

== Background ==
The bout was fought at a catch-weight of 170 lbs.

Fans and pundits alike felt that Pavlik, known for his formidable punching power, would become the first man to knock Hopkins out. Pavlik was a 4–1 betting favorite heading into the contest.

== The fight ==
The three judges scored the fight 119-106, 118-108, and 117-109 for Hopkins. The win by Hopkins ended Pavlik's previously unbeaten record, while Hopkins extended his legacy by dominating the then lineal middleweight champion.

== Aftermath ==
Ring Magazine named this fight upset of the year for 2008.

Sports Illustrated also named this fight upset of the year for 2008.

== Undercard ==
Confirmed bouts:

== Broadcasting ==
Country	Broadcaster
Ireland & United Kingdom	Setanta Sport
United States	HBO

Preceded by vs. Gary Lockett	Kelly Pavlik's bouts 18 October 2008	Succeeded by vs. Marco Antonio Rubio
Preceded by vs. Joe Calzaghe	Bernard Hopkins's bouts 18 October 2008	Succeeded by vs. Enrique Ornelas
Awards
Previous: Vic Darchinyan vs. Nonito Donaire	The Ring Upset of the Year; 2008	Next: Jorge Linares vs. Juan Carlos Salgado
