= Wale Omotoso =

Nigerian boxer

Personal information
- Nickname: Luckyboy
- Nationality: Nigerian
- Born: Oyewale Omotoso; May 6, 1985 (age 41) Nigeria
- Height: 5 ft 10 in (178 cm)
- Weight: Welterweight, Junior Middleweight

Boxing career
- Reach: 67 in (170 cm)
- Stance: Orthodox

Boxing record
- Total fights: 34
- Wins: 28
- Win by KO: 22
- Losses: 5
- Draws: 0
- No contests: 1

Wale Omotoso (born May 6, 1985) is a Nigerian professional boxer. He was based in Australia for several years, where he turned professional. In 2011, he signed with Top Rank, and was trained and managed by Freddie Roach at Wild Card Boxing in Los Angeles, California.

After a successful 15-year career, Omotoso, who had suffered two past concussions, and who wanted to ensure his ability to continue supporting his wife and two sons, retired from fighting, and became a trainer at Wild Card.

== Early life ==
He is one of five children whose mother died when he was young, and whose father did the best he could, until he, too, died in the 2000s decade. Wale learned to fight on the streets of one of Africa's most populous cities, Lagos. He calls himself "Lucky Boy", because he is lucky to be alive, let alone to have parlayed his natural ability into a ticket from the mean streets of Lagos to the clean streets of Blackburn, Victoria, a suburb of Melbourne, Australia. As children, he and his brothers had to run with a street gang. He's seen people shot, bashed, and slashed with machetes. He learned to run in zigzag fashion to avoid bullets. Six days a week, the "street boys" preyed on shopkeepers, passers-by, and weaker gangs.

== Amateur career ==
Omotoso had a reported 48 amateur fights, with only one loss. He was an all-African champion, and one of his toughest fights was with King Davison.

== Professional career ==
=== Welterweight ===
In November 2010, in Victoria, Australia, Wale was originally slated to face Muhammad Abdullaev, but ended up facing Argentine journeyman Juan Alberto Godoy. After knocking down Godoy in the fourth round, Godoy's corner threw in the towel as the referee was restarting the action, as Godoy was clearly still on shaky legs.

== Training career ==
In 2022, AB Ayad, a creative-staff member of the H3 Podcast with no boxing (or other competitive athletic) experience, to prepare for his fight in the Creator Clash event organized by YouTuber iDubbbz, asked for the toughest coach at Wild Card, and was paired up with Omotoso. Ayad noted that he soon realized he may have underestimated what "toughest coach" would mean. Fearing for AB's safety, Omotoso initially tried to talk him out of participating in the Clash, but when Ayad persisted, Omotoso adjusted his teaching techniques to allow for a rank amateur. Although AB lost to his stalwart opponent in the fifth and final round via TKO, the Omotoso–Ayad training relationship was considered a success by both parties.

== Professional boxing record ==
28 Wins (22 Knockouts), 5 Losses, 0 Draws, 1 No Contest
Res.	Record	Opponent	Type	Rd., Time	Date	Location	Notes
Win	28–4 (1)	(United States) Curtis Stevens	TKO	3 (10), 1:28	2019-08-03	(United States) Barclays Center, Brooklyn, New York, U.S.	
Loss	27–4 (1)	(United States) Chordale Booker	UD	10	2019-05-25	(United States) Beau Rivage Resort & Casino, Biloxi, Mississippi, U.S.	
Win	27–3 (1)	(Mexico) Freddy Hernandez	UD	10	2017-12-15	(United States) Pioneer Event Center, Lancaster, California, U.S.	
Loss	26–3 (1)	(United States) Jamal James	SD	10	2016-07-16	(United States) Legacy Arena, Birmingham, Alabama, U.S.	
Win	26–2 (1)	(Mexico) Gilberto Sanchez Leon	UD	10	2015-10-13	(United States) Little Creek Casino Resort, Shelton, Washington, U.S.	
Loss	25–2 (1)	(United States) Sammy Vasquez	UD	10	2015-06-21	(United States) MGM Grand Garden Arena, Las Vegas, Nevada, U.S.	
Win	25–1 (1)	(United States) Abraham Alvarez	KO	2 (8), 2:18	2014-11-20	(United States) Sportsmans Lodge, Los Angeles, California, U.S.	
Win	24–1 (1)	(Ecuador) Eduardo Flores	TKO	8 (8), 1:09	2014-08-01	(United States) Little Creek Casino Resort, Shelton, Washington, U.S.	
Loss	23–1 (1)	(United States) Jessie Vargas	UD	10	2013-03-16	(United States) Home Depot Center, Carson, California, U.S.	For vacant WBC Continental Americas welterweight title
NC	23–0 (1)	(Puerto Rico) Irving Garcia	NC	2 (10), 3:00	2012-12-07	(United States) Texas Station Casino, North Las Vegas, Nevada, U.S.	Garcia cut from accidental head clash.
Win	23–0	(Puerto Rico) Daniel Sostre	UD	8	2012-09-15	(United States) Thomas & Mack Center, Paradise, Nevada, U.S.	
Win	22–0	(United States) Larry Smith	KO	8 (8), 2:00	2012-04-28	(United States) Fairplex, Pomona, California, U.S.	
Win	21–0	(Mexico) Nestor Rosas	TKO	6 (8), 0:55	2012-02-04	(United States) Alamodome, San Antonio, Texas, U.S.	
Win	20–0	(United States) Lanardo Tyner	UD	8	2011-11-19	(United States) Reliant Arena, Houston, Texas, U.S.	
Win	19–0	(United States) Calvin Odom	TKO	5 (8), 0:33	2011-09-10	(United States) Boardwalk Hall, Atlantic City, New Jersey, U.S.	
Win	18–0	(Argentina) Juan Alberto Godoy	TKO	4 (12), 2:51	2010-11-26	Knox Netball Centre, Ferntree Gully, Australia	Won vacant IBF Pan Pacific welterweight title
Win	17–0	(Thailand) Kiatchai Singwancha	KO	4 (10), 0:35	2010-05-14	Knox Netball Centre, Ferntree Gully, Australia	Won vacant IBF Pan Pacific Youth welterweight title
Win	16–0	(New Zealand) Ray Musson	TKO	7 (10)	2010-02-26	(New Zealand) AMI Netball Centre, Saint Johns, Australia	
Win	15–0	(South Korea) Hwan-Young Park	KO	3 (12), 2:33	2009-11-27	Knox Netball Centre, Ferntree Gully, Australia	Won vacant OPBF welterweight title
Win	14–0	(United States) Emanuel Augustus	TKO	9 (10), 2:40	2009-08-21	Knox Netball Centre, Ferntree Gully, Australia	
Win	13–0	(Indonesia) Darsim Nanggala	KO	1 (10), 1:42	2009-05-22	Knox Netball Centre, Ferntree Gully, Australia	
Win	12–0	(Indonesia) Jamed Jalarante	TKO	1 (10), 1:39	2009-03-20	Knox Netball Centre, Ferntree Gully, Australia	
Win	11–0	(Indonesia) Aswin Cabuy	TKO	2 (10), 1:51	2008-11-28	Knox Netball Centre, Ferntree Gully, Australia	
Win	10–0	(Thailand) Napparat Patanakan Gym	TKO	2 (8), 2:18	2008-10-17	Reggio Calabria Club, Brunswick, Australia	
Win	9–0	(Australia) Samuel Colomban	UD	10	2008-08-22	Knox Netball Centre, Ferntree Gully, Australia	Won vacant Australian welterweight title
Win	8–0	(Indonesia) Tia Koswara	KO	1 (10), 2:36	2008-07-11	Knox Netball Centre, Ferntree Gully, Australia	
Win	7–0	(Thailand) Komsak Sithkrupon	TKO	4 (4), 0:33	2008-05-28	Melbourne Arena, Melbourne, Australia	
Win	6–0	(Philippines) Glen Masicampo	KO	3 (10), 2:49	2008-05-02	Knox Netball Centre, Ferntree Gully, Australia	
Win	5–0	(Thailand) Somchai Nakbalee	UD	6	2008-04-04	Shark Park, Townsville, Australia	
Win	4–0	(Thailand) Jakkirt Suwunnalirt	KO	1 (8), 2:27	2008-02-29	Knox Netball Centre, Ferntree Gully, Australia	
Win	3–0	(Thailand) Kongthawat Sorkitti	TKO	1 (6), 2:57	2007-12-07	Knox Netball Centre, Ferntree Gully, Australia	
Win	2–0	(Australia) Ariel Omongos	KO	1 (6), 2:32	2007-10-12	Knox Netball Centre, Ferntree Gully, Australia	
Win	1–0	(Thailand) Singyok Sor Seesunt	TKO	2 (4), 2:21	2006-09-15	Darebin Sports & Leisure Centre, Reservoir, Australia	

== Titles in boxing ==
Major Sanctioning Bodies:
WBO intercontinental Super welterweight champion

Minor Sanctioning Bodies:

- IBF Pan Pacific Welterweight Champion (147 lbs)
- IBF Pan Pacific Youth Welterweight Champion (147 lbs)
- NABF Australian National Champion Welterweight (147lbs)
- OPBF Welterweight Champion
