= Meoqui Municipality =

Municipality in the Mexican state of Chihuahua

Meoqui
- Municipality
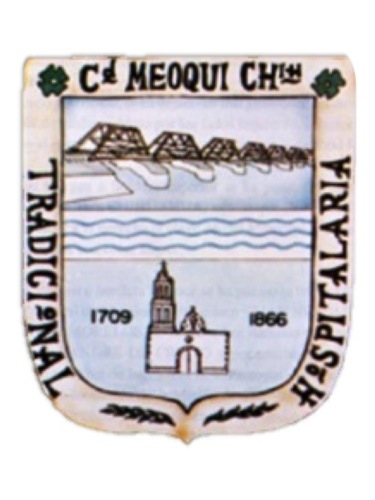
- Coat of arms

- Municipality of Meoqui in Chihuahua

- Location within Mexico
- Coordinates: 28°16′04″N 105°33′37″W
- Country: Mexico
- State: Chihuahua
- Municipal seat: Pedro Meoqui

Area
  - Total: 370 km^{2} (140 sq mi)

Population (2010)
  - Total: 43,833
  - Density: 120/km^{2} (310/sq mi)
- Time zone: UTC-6 (Zona Centro)
- Postal code: 33130
- Area code: 656

Meoqui is one of the 67 municipalities of Chihuahua, in northern Mexico. The municipal seat lies at Pedro Meoqui. The municipality covers an area of 370 km^{2}, making it one of the smallest in the state but one of the most densely populated.

As of 2010, the municipality had a total population of 43,833, up from 41,389 as of 2005.

The municipality had 882 localities, the largest of which (with 2010 populations in parentheses) were: Pedro Meoqui (22,574), Lázaro Cárdenas (8,704), classified as urban, and Estación Consuelo (1,981), Colonia Felipe Ángeles (1,254), and Guadalupe Victoria (1,045), classified as rural.

== Geography ==
=== Towns and villages ===
The municipality has 464 localities. The largest are:

Name	Population (2005)
Ciudad Meoqui	21,306
Lázaro Cárdenas	8,033
Estación Consuelo	1,892
Colonia Felipe Ángeles	1,240
Guadalupe Victoria	1,016
Las Puentes	1,009
Total Municipality	41,389

Meoqui has several other localities to the east. Following the road is "Los Cisneros" followed by Las Puentes and followed by Guadalupe Victoria then Los Garcia, an even smaller community than Las Puentes. The last locality that can be found is Julimes, known for its hot-water facilities that are used year-round.

== History ==
Conchos Indians, or "Yollis" (Meaning: Man, Men, Humans) were first travelers to settle in the Meoqui area. They divided themselves into several groups, some occupying areas in Casas Grandes, and down south to Julimes. The Conchos dedicated themselves to agriculture, they developed the "Coas", sharp branches used to make a hole in the ground to plant seeds. Growing corn and beans were the highest priority.

Their development of tools was also great. They made "molcajetes", a type of tool to grind seeds for food. Their clothes were scarce, and many members were nude. Wooden bows and arrows were made as well, they were hunters and gatherers too.

Natural enemies to the Conchos were the "Tobosos" inhabitants of the "mapimi". Their fights were many over land for growing of crops.

With the arrival of travelers from Spain, the Conchos were the first ethnic group to disappear. We know this because in this area were the first known colonies of the Spanish.

In 1693 Fray Andrés Ramirez, a religious man from the "Fransiscanos" founded a town or pueblo de visita under the patronage of Saint Paul, San Pablo. This town later came to be Conversion de San Pablo. It was located by the San Pedro river.

Those religious men who brought the catholic religion to the land also brought new ways to plant and grow crops.

They, however, also used the natives in an inhumane way, forcing them to work in mines and make homes. Thanks to the hard work, and the infectious diseases brought by the Spanish conquerors the natives became extinct.

At the beginning of 1718 Julimes, and the towns under its jurisdiction, in which Meoqui was included, then St Pablo, created a mission where between the years of 1723 and 1770 many marriages were celebrated and the population was stable.

By the end of 1771 Captain Bernardo D' Galvez was replaced by Colonel Hugo D' O'Conor, who was also given the title of inspector of military premises. His goal was to have all native tribes in check against each other. 1n 1773 O' Conor organized a line of missions under a new order, and at this time obtaining the "Cerro Gordo" and becoming leader of the area.

In 1773 in St Pablo (Meoqui), resided the 4th Company "Volante". The building that at one point gave home to other militants, was turned into a prison. It included space for worship, the prisoners, the guards and their families. The prison also had corrals for animals, and storage for food.

The "Volante" company included One captain, two lieutenants, 2 Sergeants, 4 Squad leaders 59 soldiers, and 25 natives as auxiliary members.

In November 1797 the Captain of said company (Cpt Jose Manuel Ochoa) was ordered to leave St Pablo and asked to repopulate the town of Santa Rosalia.

On September 15, 1810, Miguel Hidalgo y Costilla began the fight for independence. Prisoners were held in Meoqui on April 20, 1811. Several soldiers took shelter in the streets of Hidalgo & Degollado, where now sits a monument.

By 1825 the 4th Volante Company was gone, and on January 5, 1826, the first political organization was founded in Chihuahua and divided into 11 parties. Julimes, Ojinaga, and Coyame are included in the San Geronimo party.

In 1836 some modifications in the organization took San Pablo, Julimes and San Pedro into the Rosales party. In November 1847 federal regimen created unities and got rid of parties. In 1866 when the empire under Archduke Maximilian D' Austria was declining, president Benito Juarez and his Ministers started a trip back to Chihuahua. Once in San Pablo they are welcomed with festivities, at this time the name is changed to Villa de Meoqui in honor to General Pedro Meoqui Mañon who died in Chihuahua in December 1866. December 11, 1966 a new article under the constitution changed the name and added "Ciudad Meoqui" defining it as a city in the state of Chihuahua.
