= Ponte di Brenta railway station =

Railway station in Italy

Ponte di Brenta
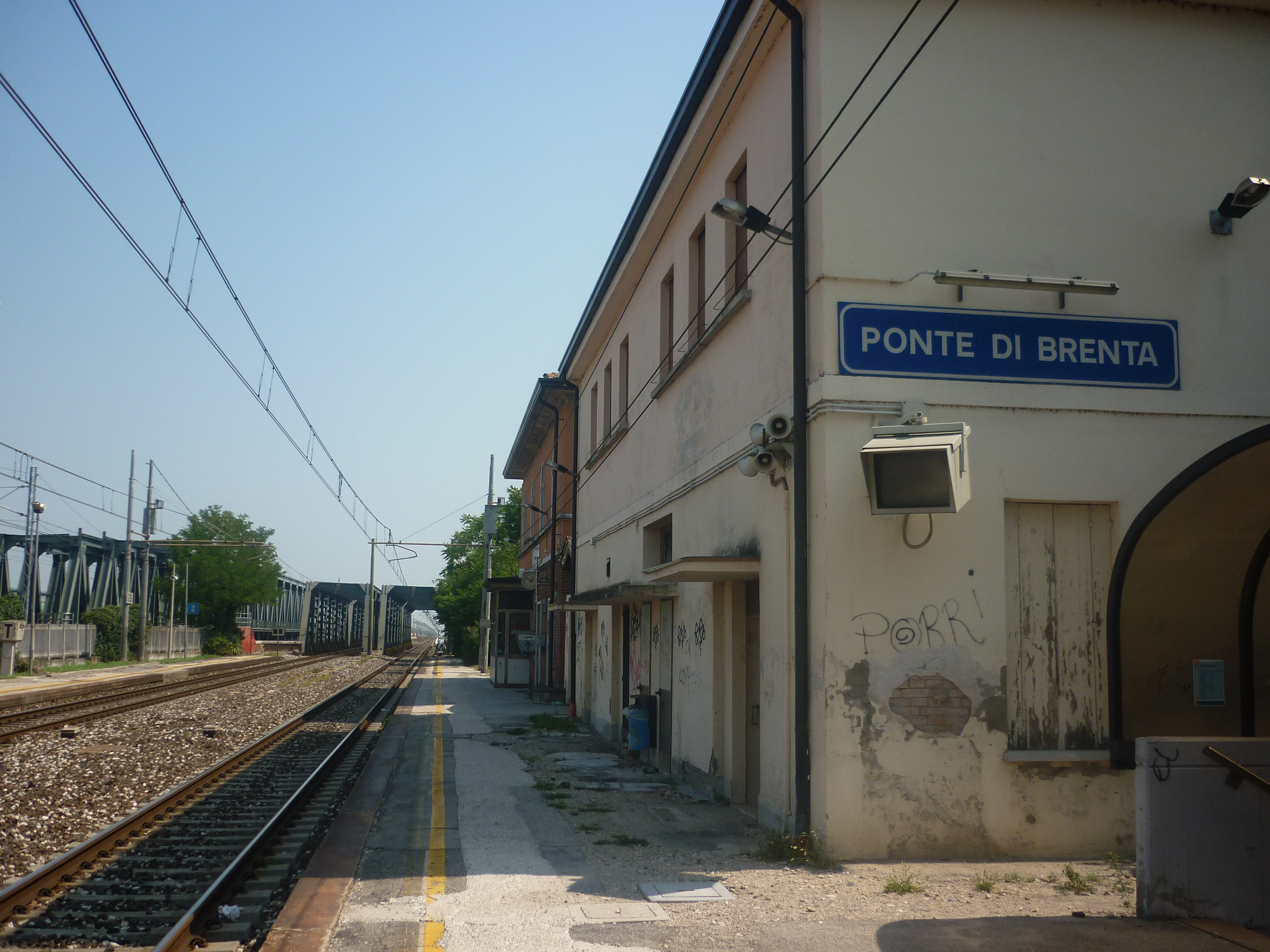
- Ponte di Brenta railway station

General information
- Location: via S.Marco 255; Ponte di Brenta (PD); Padua, Padua, Veneto; Italy
- Coordinates: 45°25′45″N 11°56′51″E
- Owner: Rete Ferroviaria Italiana
- Line: Milan–Venice railway
- Platforms: 2 (4 tracks)
- Train operators: Trenitalia

Other information
- Classification: Bronze

History
- Closed: 13 December 2015; 10 years ago
Location
- Location within Veneto Location within Northern Italy Location within Italy

Ponte di Brenta (Italian: Stazione di Ponte di Brenta) was a railway station in the Italian city of Padua, in the Veneto region. The station was located on the Milan–Venice railway. The station closed on 13 December 2015.

This area is now served by a bus service.

== Train services ==
The station was served by the following service(s):

- Local services (Treno regionale) Verona - Vicenza - Padua - Venice
