= Bernard Hopkins vs. Joe Calzaghe =

Boxing match

Battle of the Planet
- Date: April 19, 2008
- Venue: Thomas & Mack Center, Paradise, Nevada, U.S.
- Title on the line: The Ring light heavyweight title

Tale of the tape
Boxer	Bernard Hopkins	Joe Calzaghe
Nickname	The Executioner	Pride of Wales
Hometown	Philadelphia, Pennsylvania, U.S.	Newbridge, Wales
Pre-fight record	48–4–1 (1) (32 KO)	44–0 (32 KO)
Age	43 years, 3 months	36 years
Height	6 ft 1 in (185 cm)	6 ft 0 in (183 cm)
Weight	173 lb (78 kg)	173 lb (78 kg)
Style	Orthodox	Southpaw
Recognition	The Ring; Light Heavyweight Champion; IBF/WBO; No. 1 Ranked Light Heavyweight; WBC; No. 4 Ranked Light Heavyweight; The Ring No. 4 ranked pound-for-pound fighter 2-division world champion	WBA (Super), WBC, WBO, and The Ring; Super Middleweight Champion; The Ring No. 5 ranked pound-for-pound fighter

Result
- Calzaghe wins via 12-round split decision (113–114, 115–112, 116–111)

Bernard Hopkins vs. Joe Calzaghe, billed as Battle of the Planet, was a professional boxing match contested on April 19, 2008, for The Ring light heavyweight championship. It took place at the Thomas & Mack Center in Paradise, Nevada.

== Background ==
Hopkins had made 20 consecutive title defenses as a middleweight before his two losses to Jermain Taylor. At about the same time, Calzaghe made 21 consecutive title defenses in the super middleweight division from Europe during a decade-long reign. Hopkins claimed Calzaghe declined to fight him after Don King's "middleweight tournament" in 2001, in which Hopkins won three title belts, although Calzaghe denies this.

On July 21, 2007, Hopkins defeated Winky Wright by unanimous decision to retain The Ring light heavyweight championship. After the fight, Hopkins called out Calzaghe and said that he wanted to fight him at Yankee Stadium on the fourth of July. On November 3, 2007, Calzaghe defeated Mikkel Kessler by unanimous decision to retain his WBO super middleweight title and win the WBC and WBA super middleweight titles.

On December 7, 2007, Hopkins and Calzaghe met face to face in the media room set up for the Floyd Mayweather Jr. vs. Ricky Hatton fight. Hopkins and Calzaghe began shouting insults and taunting each other, with Hopkins shouting, "You're not even in my league! I would never let a white boy beat me. I would never lose to a white boy. I couldn't go back to the projects if I let a white boy beat me." Hopkins would later explain his comments, saying that it was not meant to be taken as a racial slur or a reflection of his feelings on white fighters, but simply said to create some hype for his fight with Calzaghe. On January 23, 2008, the fight was officially announced to take place on April 19, 2008, at the Thomas & Mack Center in Las Vegas.

For his training, Hopkins worked with Freddie Roach, Naazim Richardson, John David Jackson (who fought Hopkins in 1997), and Mackie Shilstone. Calzaghe was trained by his father, Enzo. The fight was promoted by Golden Boy Promotions and Frank Warren's Sports Network. The bout was televised on HBO World Championship Boxing in the United States and on Setanta Sports 1 in the United Kingdom and the referee was Joe Cortez. Both fighters weighed in at 173 lb (78 kg). 14,213 were in attendance for the fight, with at least half of them making the trip overseas from the United Kingdom to support Calzaghe. After winning the fight, Calzaghe made reference to Hopkins' pre-fight outburst. A grinning Calzaghe told Hopkins he had 'just got his arse kicked by a white boy', leading to laughter from the crowd and media.

== The fight ==
In the first round, Calzaghe, who was seven years younger than Hopkins, was knocked down with Hopkins landing a short right hand which led to Calzaghe suffering a small cut on the bridge of his nose.

Calzaghe was warned by referee Joe Cortez in the second round for throwing a low blow. Cortez later warned both fighters for hitting behind the head. The fight was definitely slipping into the pattern that favored Hopkins - slow, down and dirty. Cortez called a timeout and brought both fighters to the center of the ring for a lecture in the fourth round. He did that after both of them had committed fouls - Calzaghe for holding and hitting and Hopkins for hitting on the break. Calzaghe still managed to land a couple of blows to the back of Hopkins' head at the end of the fifth round.

Calzaghe never got the opportunity to showcase his hand speed and combinations. Hopkins would smother him whenever he tried to come in and throw more than one punch. But Hopkins seemed to slow down in the later rounds.

In the 10th round, Calzaghe hit Hopkins with a punch that Hopkins claimed was low. Hopkins crumpled to the canvas and was slow getting up. Cortez didn't take away a point, but gave Hopkins a five-minute break to gather himself. Calzaghe thought Hopkins was acting and waved for the crowd to show their displeasure with Hopkins. The fans booed on cue. Hopkins used the full five minutes to recuperate.

"It was a low blow," Hopkins said. "It knocked my privates out of the cup. That's why Joe gave me five minutes." Hopkins complained of another low blow in the 11th round, but this time Cortez ignored his plea for time and told him to keep fighting. He came out and tried to ferociously attack Calzaghe, but Calzaghe charged back.

In the end, judges Chuck Giampa (116–111) and Ted Gimza (115–112) scored the fight for Calzaghe, while judge Adalaide Byrd (114–113) scored the fight for Hopkins.

HBO's unofficial ringside judge Harold Lederman scored the bout 116–111 for Calzaghe.

"It was a good fight. I thought Bernard (Hopkins) won though. But, I'm glad that Calzaghe won this. It was a good fight," commented former undisputed Heavyweight champion, Mike Tyson.

According to CompuBox, Calzaghe landed more punches on Hopkins than any of his previous opponents. Calzaghe landed 232 punches, almost double the number of punches landed by Hopkins (127).

== Aftermath ==
After the fight, Calzaghe called Hopkins one of the toughest fighters he had ever fought. He said, "I knew this wouldn't look pretty tonight. He's so awkward. He gave me some good shots. It wasn't my best night, but I won the fight. The world title in a second division and a win in America is just icing on the cake for my career." Roy Jones Jr. was discussed as the next most likely opponent for Calzaghe, and that fight took place in November 2008.

Hopkins was upset with the official decision and believed that he was robbed of a clear points win. He said, "I just really feel like I took the guy to school. I feel like I made him fight my fight, not his. I wanted him to run into my shots. I think I made him do that, and I think I made it look pretty easy. I think I controlled the pace, and I controlled the fight."

== Undercard ==
Confirmed bouts:

- (Mexico) David Lopez KOs (United States) Ryan Davis in the fifth round.
- (United Kingdom) Audley Harrison KOs (United States) Jason Barnett in the fifth round.
- (United Kingdom) Nathan Cleverly defeats (United States) Antonio Baker via unanimous decision.
- (United States) Danny Garcia KOs (United States) Guadalupe Diaz in the first round.
- (United States) Daniel Jacobs KOs (United States) Leshon Sims in the fourth round.
- (United States) Hylon Williams Jr. defeats (United States) Marcos Mendias via unanimous decision.
- (United States) Jermell Charlo KOs (United States) Jesus Villareal in the third round.

== Broadcasting ==
Country	Broadcaster
Australia	Main Event
Denmark	TV2 Sport
Hungary	Sport 2
Ireland & United Kingdom	Setanta Sports
United States	HBO

Preceded by vs. Winky Wright	Bernard Hopkins's bouts 19 April 2008	Succeeded by vs. Kelly Pavlik
Preceded by vs. Mikkel Kessler	Joe Calzaghe's bouts 19 April 2008	Succeeded by vs. Roy Jones Jr.
