= Sebastian Zbik =

German boxer (born 1982)

Personal information
- Nationality: German
- Born: 17 March 1982 (age 44) Neubrandenburg, East Germany (nowadays Germany)
- Height: 5 ft 11 1/2 in (182 cm)
- Weight: Middleweight; Super middleweight

Boxing career
- Reach: 72 in (183 cm)
- Stance: Orthodox

Boxing record
- Total fights: 32
- Wins: 30
- Win by KO: 10
- Losses: 2

Sebastian Zbik (born 17 March 1982) is a German former professional boxer and the former WBC middleweight Champion of the world. He resides in Mecklenburg-Vorpommern.

== Professional career ==
Zbik won the interim WBC middleweight title against Italian Domenico Spada on 11 July 2009. He was given the full title in January 2011 when the WBC promoted Sergio Martínez to emeritus champion.

Zbik lost his newly awarded WBC Middleweight Championship against undefeated Mexican Julio César Chávez Jr. at Staples Center Los Angeles, California on 4 June 2011.

On 13 April 2012, Zbik went to Cologne, Germany, to face fellow German and current WBA Super World Middleweight Champion Felix Sturm in a German world title showdown. Sturm would go on to earn his 16th KO in his 37 wins with a 9th-round TKO stoppage of Zbik.

== Professional boxing record ==
| 32 fights | 30 wins | 2 losses |
|---|---|---|
| By knockout | 10 | 1 |
| By decision | 20 | 1 |

| No. | Result | Record | Opponent | Type | Round, time | Date | Location | Notes |
|---|---|---|---|---|---|---|---|---|
| 32 | Loss | 30–2 | Felix Sturm | RTD | 9 (12) | 2012-04-13 | Lanxess Arena, Cologne, Germany | For WBA super middleweight title |
| 31 | Loss | 30–1 | Julio César Chávez Jr. | MD | 12 (12) | 2011-06-04 | Staples Center, Los Angeles, California, U.S. | Lost WBC middleweight title |
| 30 | Win | 30–0 | Jorge Sebastian Heiland | UD | 12 (12) | 2010-07-31 | O2 World, Altona, Germany | Retained interim WBC middleweight title |
| 29 | Win | 29–0 | Domenico Spada | UD | 12 (12) | 2010-04-17 | Bordelandhalle, Magdeburg, Germany | Retained interim WBC middleweight title |
| 28 | Win | 28–0 | Emanuele Della Rosa | SD | 12 (12) | 2009-12-19 | Sport and Congress Center, Schwerin, Germany | Retained interim WBC middleweight title |
| 27 | Win | 27–0 | Domenico Spada | UD | 12 (12) | 2009-07-11 | Nuerburgring race track, Nuerburg, Germany | Won inaugural interim WBC middleweight title |
| 26 | Win | 26–0 | Ruben Varon | KO | 4 (12) | 2009-03-20 | Sporthalle, Alsterdorf, Germany | Retained WBO Inter-Continental middleweight title |
| 25 | Win | 25–0 | Christophe Karagoz | UD | 8 (8) | 2008-12-05 | Sporthalle Brandberge, Halle an der Saale, Germany | |
| 24 | Win | 24–0 | John Anderson de Souza | UD | 12 (12) | 2008-08-29 | Burg-Waechter Castello, Duesseldorf, Germany | Retained WBO Inter-Continental middleweight title |
| 23 | Win | 23–0 | Mario Alberto Lopez | TKO | 2 (12) | 2008-07-05 | Gerry Weber Stadium, Halle, Germany | Retained WBO Inter-Continental middleweight title |
| 22 | Win | 22–0 | Marco Schulze | UD | 12 (12) | 2008-04-19 | Bordelandhalle, Magdeburg, Germany | Retained WBO Inter-Continental middleweight title |
| 21 | Win | 21–0 | Samir dos Santos Barbosa | UD | 12 (12) | 2007-12-07 | Sporthalle, Alsterdorf, Germany | Retained WBO Inter-Continental middleweight title |
| 20 | Win | 20–0 | William Ruiz | KO | 1 (6) | 2007-10-20 | Gerry Weber Stadium, Halle, Germany | |
| 19 | Win | 19–0 | Ruben Silva Diaz | UD | 8 (8) | 2007-07-14 | Color Line Arena, Altona, Germany | |
| 18 | Win | 18–0 | Alejandro Gustavo Falliga | UD | 12 (12) | 2007-05-25 | Fight Night Arena, Cologne, Germany | Retained WBO Inter-Continental middleweight title |
| 17 | Win | 17–0 | Fawaz Nasir | UD | 12 (12) | 2007-02-16 | Fight Night Arena, Cologne, Germany | Won vacant WBO Inter-Continental middleweight title |
| 16 | Win | 16–0 | Jose Hilton Dos Santos | UD | 10 (10) | 2006-11-21 | Universum Gym, Wandsbek, Germany | |
| 15 | Win | 15–0 | Ismael Kerzazi | TKO | 3 (6) | 2006-09-19 | Kugelbake Halle, Cuxhaven, Germany | |
| 14 | Win | 14–0 | Michel Mothmora | KO | 1 (8) | 2006-07-15 | Color Line Arena, Altona, Germany | |
| 13 | Win | 13–0 | Gotthard Hinteregger | UD | 8 (8) | 2006-04-29 | Hanns-Martin-Schleyer-Halle, Stuttgart, Germany | |
| 12 | Win | 12–0 | David Sarraille | TKO | 6 (8) | 2006-03-07 | Kugelbake Halle, Cuxhaven, Germany | |
| 11 | Win | 11–0 | Attila Kiss | KO | 2 (8) | 2006-02-04 | Burg-Waechter Castello, Duesseldorf, Germany | |
| 10 | Win | 10–0 | Siarhei Navarka | TKO | 4 (6) | 2005-10-25 | TV-Studio 44, Vienna, Austria | |
| 9 | Win | 9–0 | Thomas Hengstberger | TKO | 5 (6) | 2005-09-20 | T-Mobile Arena, Prague, Czech Republic | |
| 8 | Win | 8–0 | Aliaksandr Shnip | UD | 6 (6) | 2005-07-02 | Color Line Arena, Altona, Germany | |
| 7 | Win | 7–0 | Manuel De la Rosa | UD | 6 (6) | 2005-05-10 | Pueblo Espanol, Palma de Mallorca, Spain | |
| 6 | Win | 6–0 | Arash Warasy | UD | 6 (6) | 2005-03-26 | Erdgas Arena, Riesa, Germany | |
| 5 | Win | 5–0 | Mazen Girke | UD | 6 (6) | 2005-02-26 | Color Line Arena, Altona, Germany | |
| 4 | Win | 4–0 | Cenk Ulug | TKO | 3 (4) | 2004-12-14 | Freizeit Arena, Soelden, Austria | |
| 3 | Win | 3–0 | Peter Durdik | UD | 4 (4) | 2004-09-21 | Universum Gym, Wandsbek, Germany | |
| 2 | Win | 2–0 | Gaspar Lucian | PTS | 4 (4) | 2004-09-11 | Kisstadion, Budapest, Hungary | |
| 1 | Win | 1–0 | Andrei Berendi | UD | 4 (4) | 2004-07-17 | Stadthalle, Zwickau, Germany | |

== See also ==
- List of world middleweight boxing champions

Sporting positions
Regional boxing titles
| Vacant Title last held by Khoren Gevor | WBO Inter-Continental middleweight champion 16 February 2007 – 2009; Vacated | Vacant Title next held by Gennady Golovkin |
World boxing titles
| New title | WBC middleweight champion Interim title 11 July 2009 – 18 January 2011; Promoted | Vacant Title next held by Marco Antonio Rubio |
| Preceded by Sergio Martínez; Status changed | WBC middleweight champion 18 January 2011 – 4 June 2011 | Succeeded by Julio César Chávez Jr. |
