= Stadio Nicola Pietrangeli =

Tennis stadium in Rome, Italy

- Stadio Nicola Pietrangeli
- Il Pietrangeli
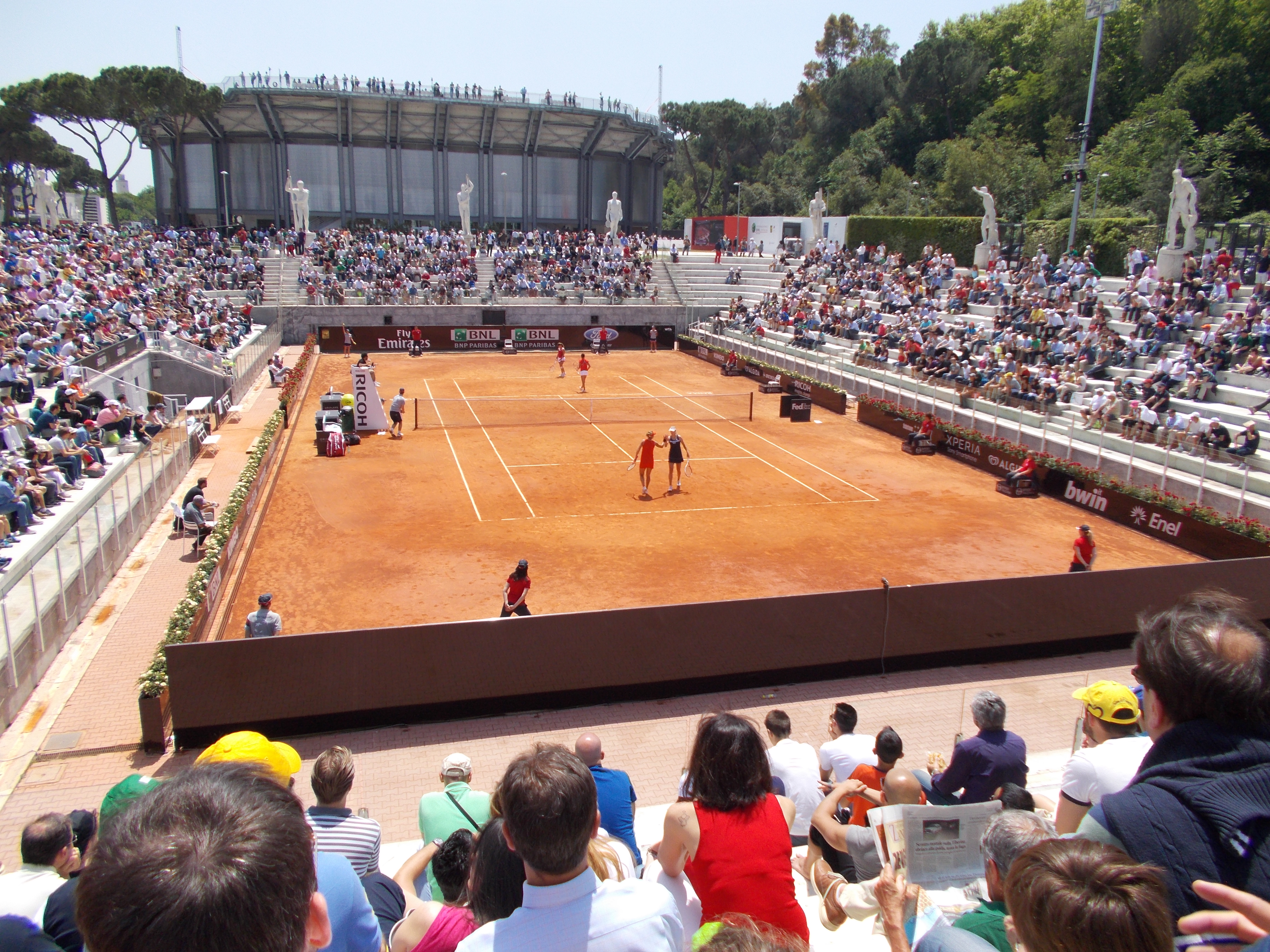
- The Stadio Nicola Pietrangeli at the Foro Italico
- Interactive map of Stadio Nicola Pietrangeli
- Former names: Olimpico della Racchetta; Stadio della Pallacorda
- Address: Viale delle Olimpiadi; Foro Italico; Rome; Italy
- Coordinates: 41°55′45″N 12°27′22″E
- Owner: Sport e Salute
- Operator: Sport e Salute
- Capacity: 3,720
- Type: Tennis stadium
- Event: Sporting events
- Surface: Clay
- Field shape: Rectangular
- Current use: Tennis venue Temporary multi-sport venue

Construction
- Groundbreaking: 1931
- Built: 1931–1933
- Opened: 1934
- Renovated: 2005–2006
- Expanded: 2008–2009 (temporary stands)
- Architect: Costantino Costantini

Tenants
- Italian Open Italy Davis Cup team: 1935–present 1934–2005

Website
- sportesalute.eu

The Stadio Nicola Pietrangeli, formerly known as the Stadio della Pallacorda, is an outdoor tennis stadium within the Foro Italico sports complex in Rome, Italy. Opened in 1934, it was the principal court of the Italian Open until the construction of a larger central stadium during the 1990s. The stadium has a clay playing surface and permanent seating for 3,720 spectators.

The court is surrounded by 18 statues of athletes made from Carrara marble. In 2006, it was renamed in honour of Italian tennis player Nicola Pietrangeli.

== History ==
=== Construction and opening ===
The stadium formed part of the original development of the Foro Italico, then known as the Foro Mussolini. It was included in the master plan prepared by architect Enrico Del Debbio and was designed by Costantino Costantini. Construction took place between 1931 and 1933.

The stadium was constructed as a sunken amphitheatre. The upper edge of its stands was placed approximately at the level of the surrounding pedestrian areas, with the marble seating descending towards the central clay court. The stands were made using Carrara marble, while 18 marble statues depicting athletes were installed around the stadium.

The venue was initially called the Olimpico della Racchetta and was subsequently known as the Stadio della Pallacorda. It was inaugurated in 1934 with a Davis Cup tie between Italy and Switzerland.

=== Italian Open and Davis Cup ===
In 1935, the Italian International Championships, now known as the Italian Open, moved from Milan to the Foro Italico. The Pallacorda became the tournament's principal stadium.

Following a suspension during the late 1930s and the Second World War, the Italian Open returned in 1950. The stadium remained the main court of the tournament for most editions until the 1990s.

The stadium also regularly hosted home ties involving the Italy Davis Cup team. After the inaugural Italy–Switzerland tie in 1934, Davis Cup tennis returned to the venue in July 1949, when Italy defeated Denmark. It subsequently hosted numerous Italian Davis Cup ties, with the last staged at the stadium in 2005.

=== Other sporting events ===
From 24 to 26 September 1948, the stadium hosted matches during the inaugural 1948 Men's European Volleyball Championship. The event was played as a single round-robin tournament and was won by Czechoslovakia.

The venue has subsequently been adapted temporarily for several other sports. It hosted stages of the FIVB Beach Volleyball World Tour in 2010 and 2013, with the clay court replaced by a temporary sand surface.

It was converted into a temporary taekwondo arena for editions of the World Taekwondo Grand Prix in 2018, 2019, 2022 and 2023. For these events, a temporary lightweight roof was installed over the court.

In 2021, the stadium hosted the Street Skateboarding World Championships on a temporary course constructed over the playing area.

During the 2022 European Aquatics Championships, the Pietrangeli hosted the artistic swimming competitions. A temporary pool measuring 30 m (98 ft) by 20 m (66 ft) and approximately 3 m (9.8 ft) deep was installed inside the stadium.

=== Secondary stadium and renaming ===
By the 1990s, the Pallacorda's limited capacity was no longer sufficient for the largest Italian Open matches. A larger temporary central stadium, partly constructed from laminated wood, opened nearby in 1996. The Pallacorda consequently became the secondary show court of the tennis complex.

The original central stadium was dismantled in 2008 to allow the construction of the present Stadio Centrale del Tennis. During the 2008 and 2009 Italian Opens, the Pallacorda again served as the tournament's principal court. Temporary stands increased its capacity to approximately 9,500 spectators during this period.

On 27 April 2006, the Italian National Olympic Committee and the Italian Tennis Federation announced that the stadium would be renamed after Nicola Pietrangeli. Pietrangeli won the French Championships singles title in 1959 and 1960 and held Italy's record for Davis Cup appearances.

The naming was unusual because Pietrangeli was still living when the honour was conferred. CONI described him as an icon of Italian tennis and noted his close association with Rome and the Foro Italico.

=== Architecture ===
The stadium was designed in the form of a classical amphitheatre, with the court situated below the surrounding ground level. Its sunken configuration allows spectators to enter near the top of the stands before descending towards their seats.

Eighteen statues stand above the seating bowl. Most were created by sculptor Eugenio Baroni and depict athletes in idealised classical poses. One statue, depicting a ball thrower, was made by Domenico Ponzi in 1942.

The use of white Carrara marble, the open-air design and the surrounding statues have made the stadium one of the most recognisable courts in international tennis. The stadium is connected through underground passages to neighbouring service buildings and other parts of the Foro Italico tennis complex.

== Gallery ==
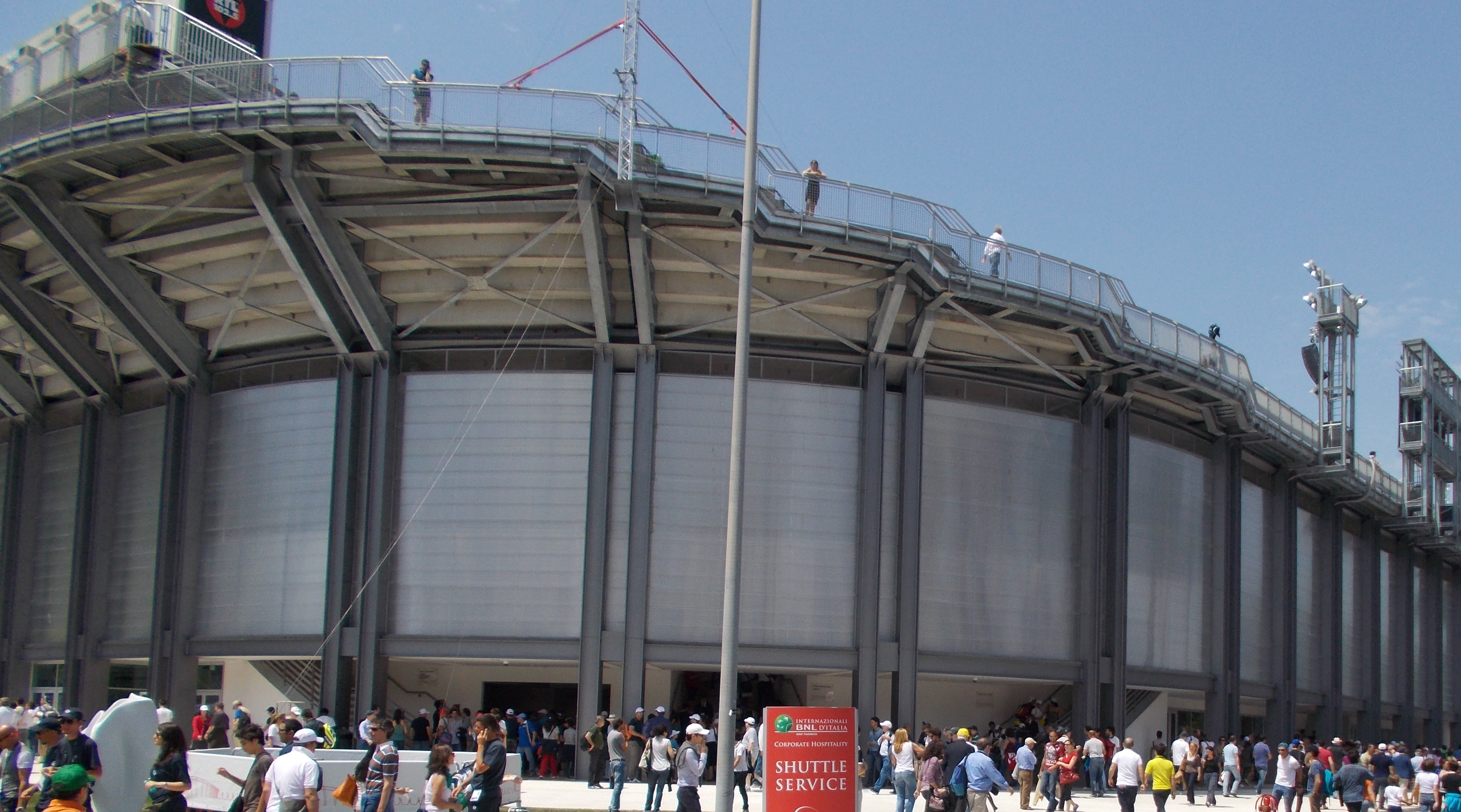
Interior view of the stadium

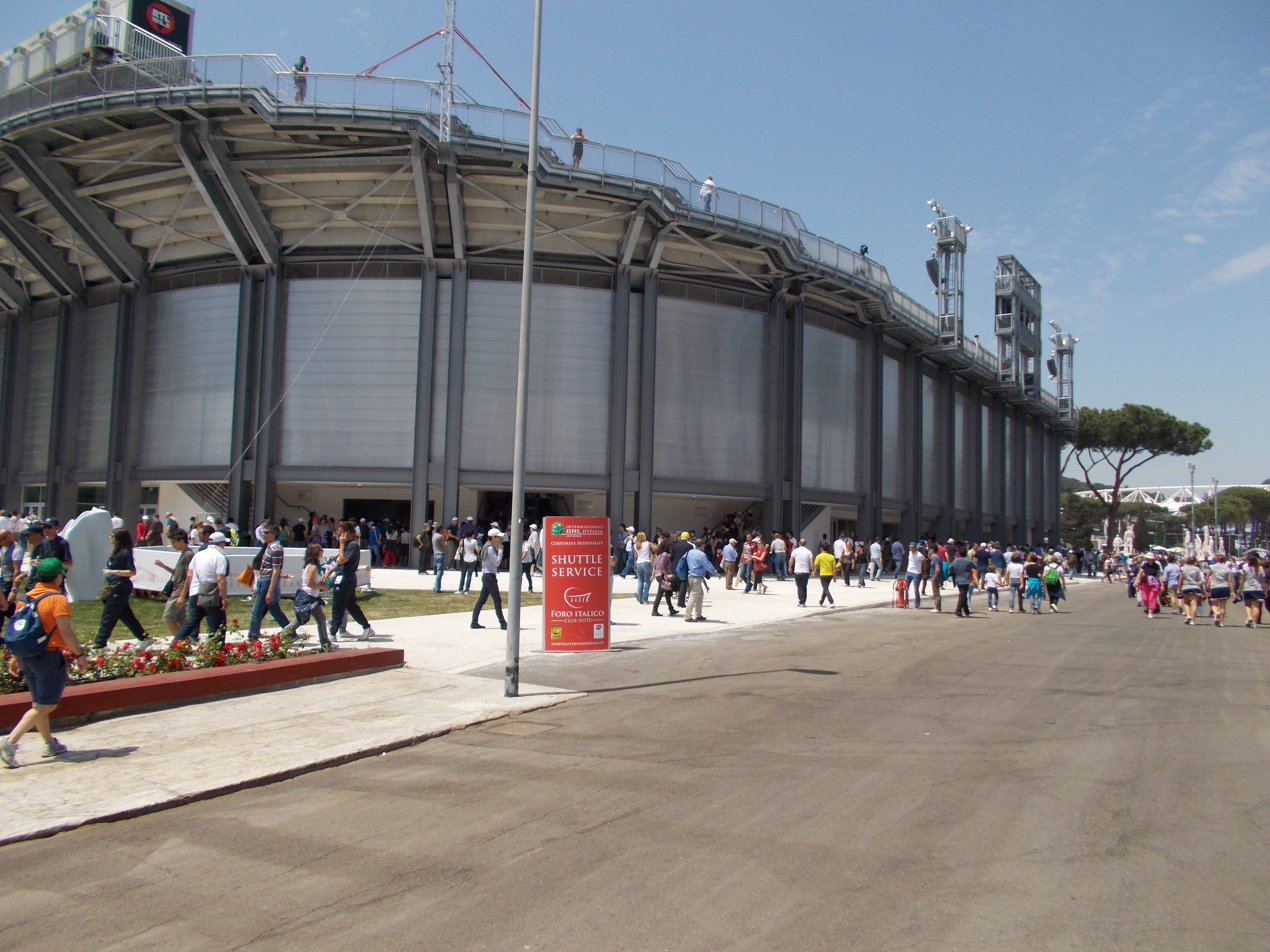
The central clay court and surrounding stands

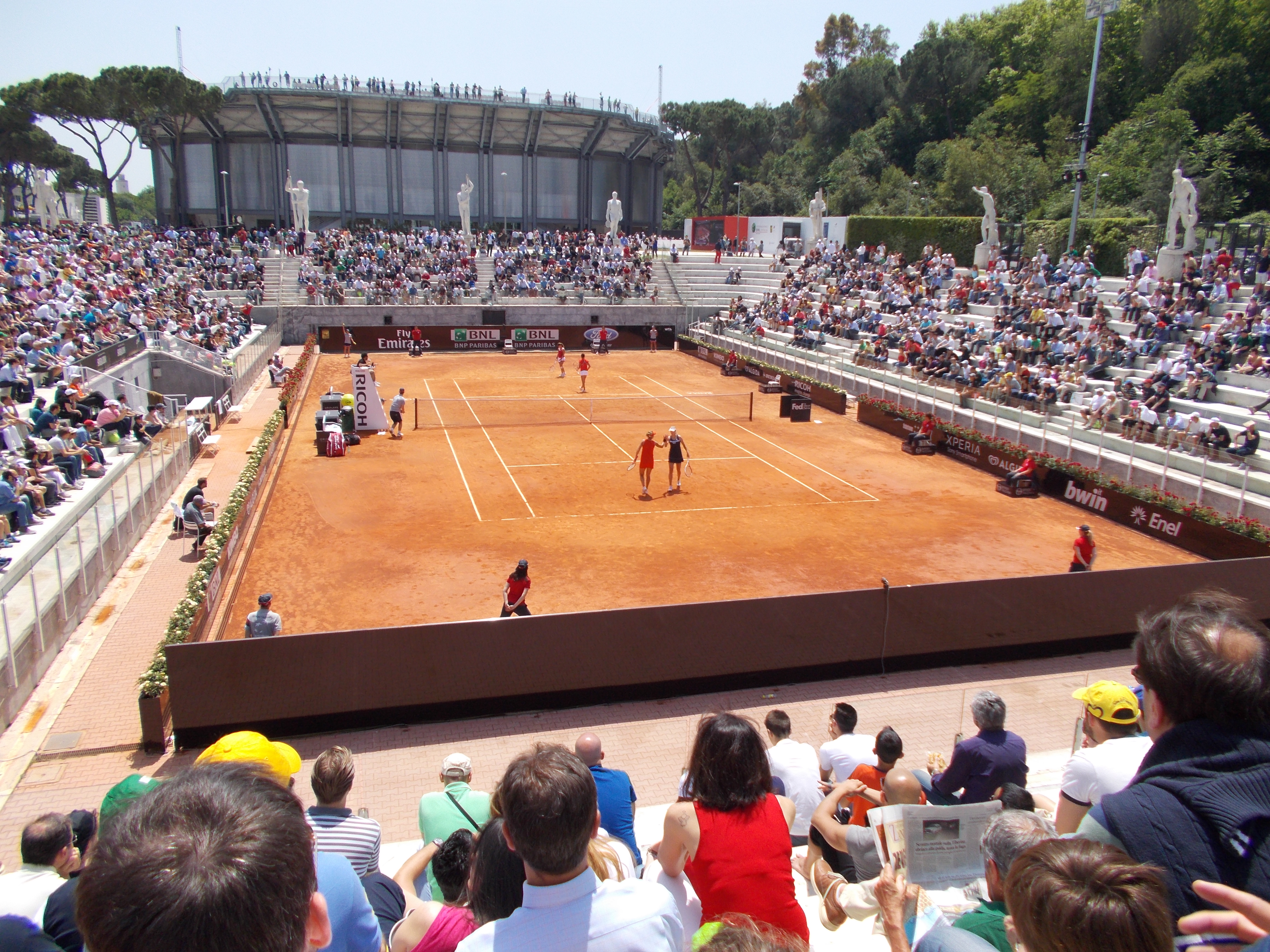
Stadio Nicola Pietrangeli

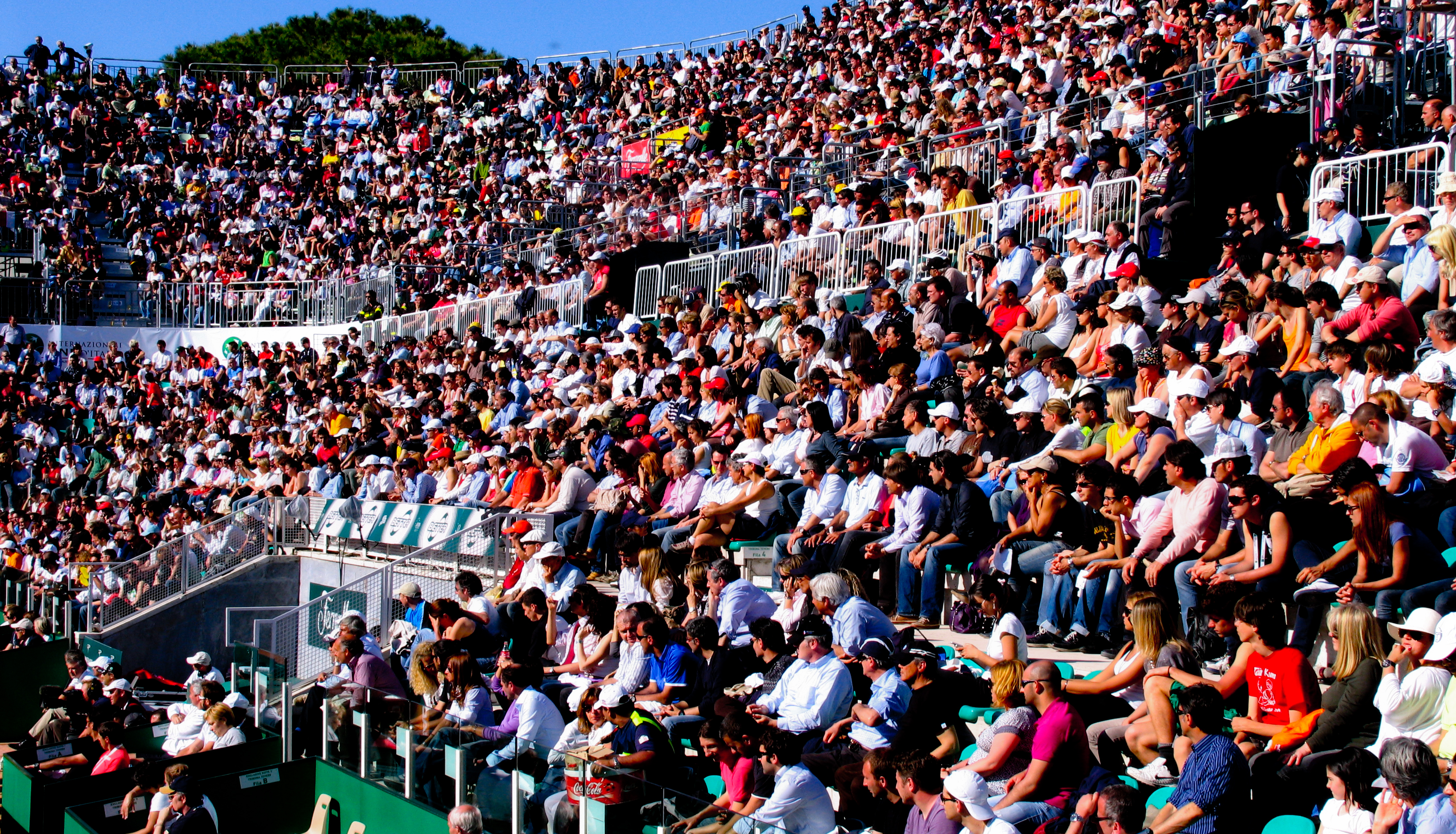
Side grandstand during the 2011 Italian Open

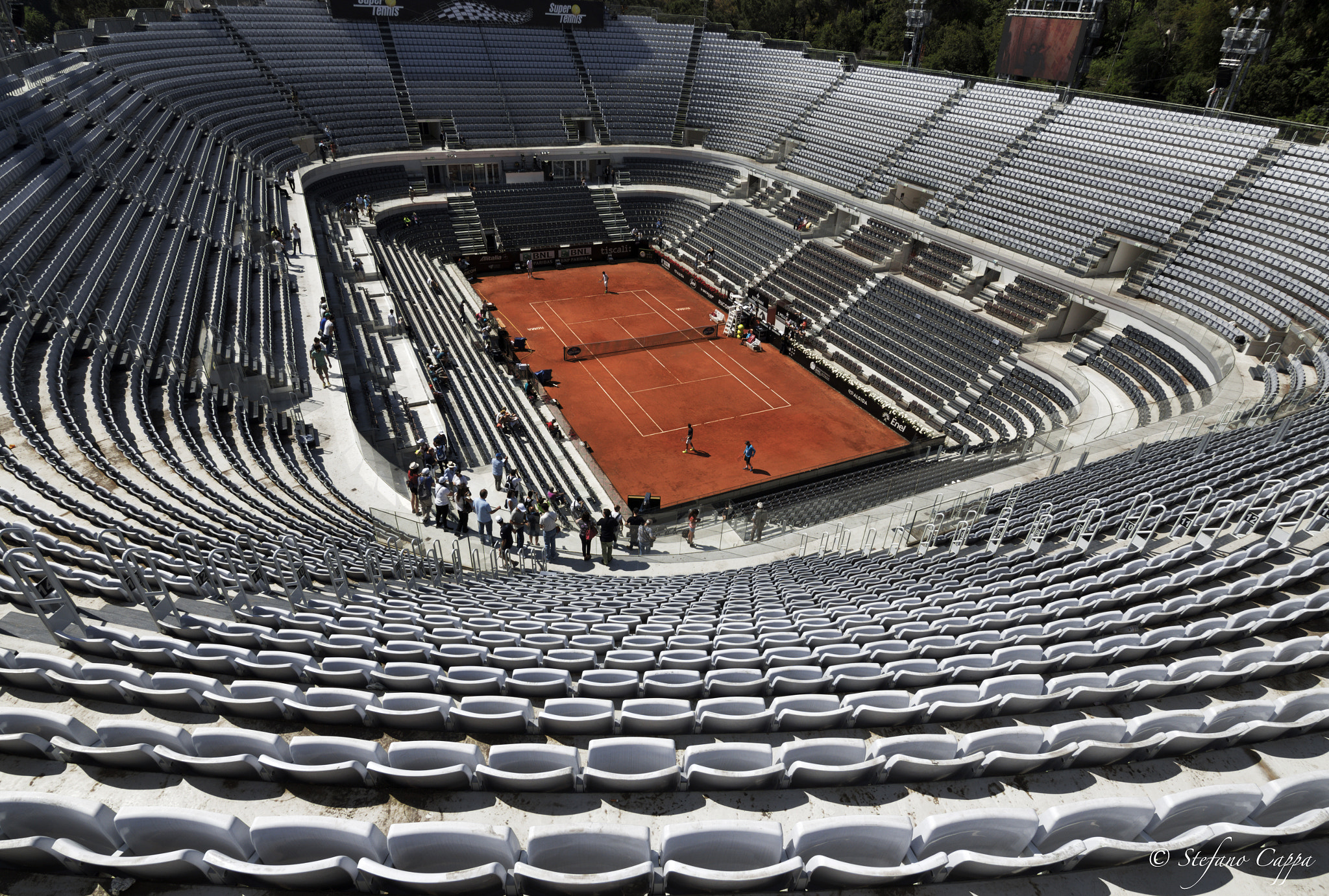
The stadium during the Stadio Centrale del Tennis

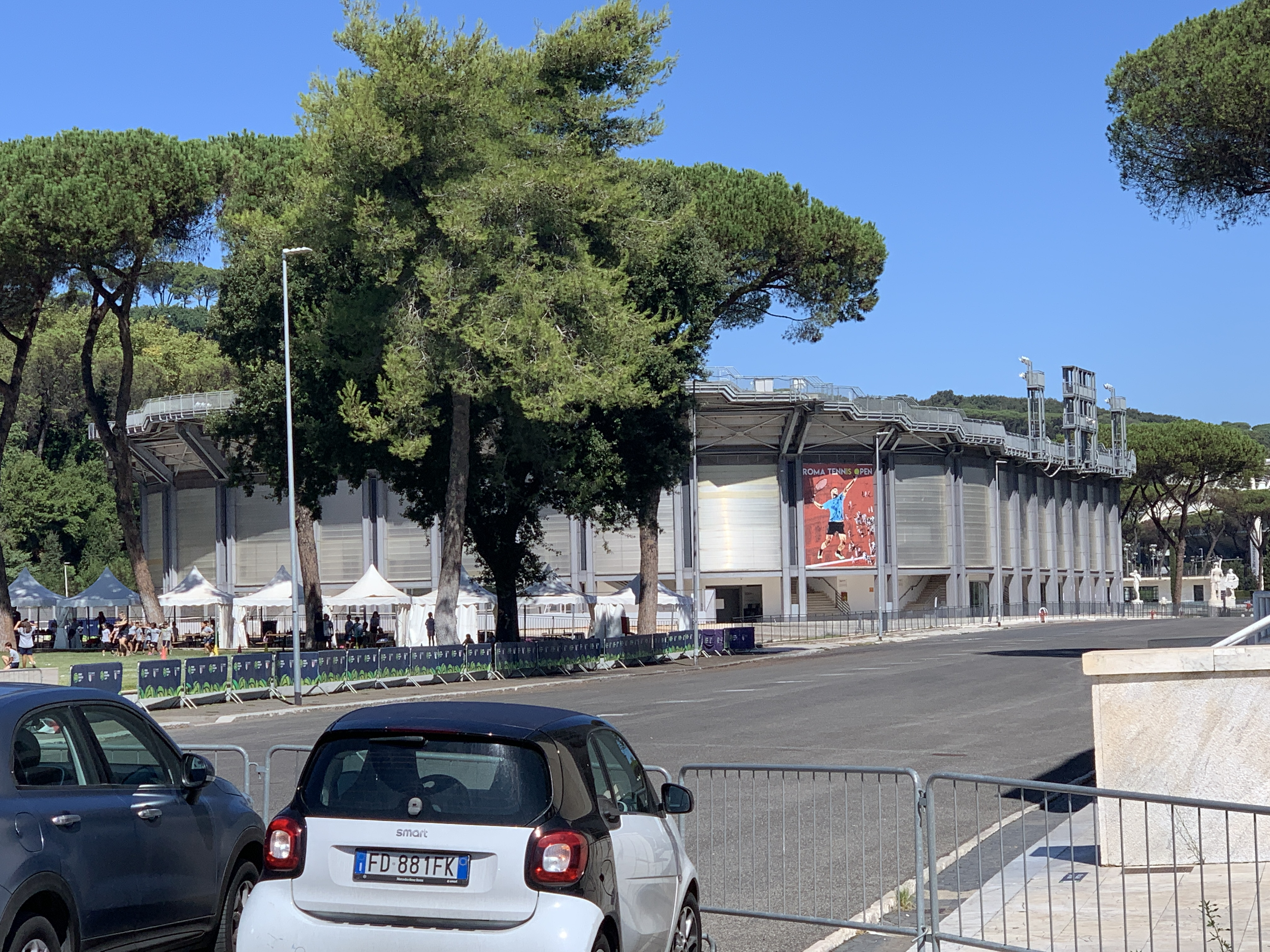
Exterior and grandstand view in 2021

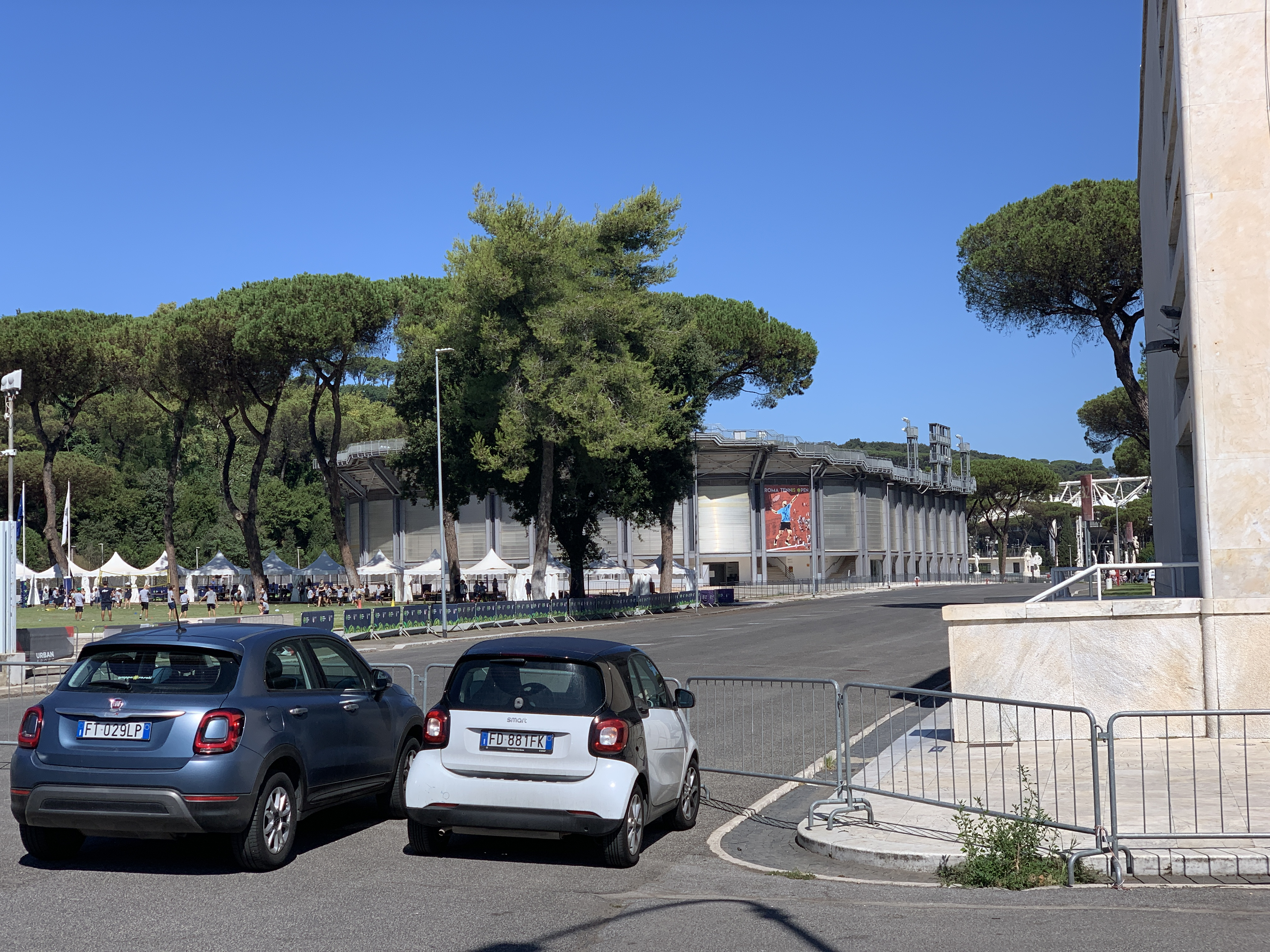
View of the stadium structure in 2021

== See also ==
- Foro Italico
- Italian Open (tennis)
- Stadio Centrale del Tennis
- Stadio dei Marmi
- Stadio Olimpico
