= Omar Chávez =

Mexican boxer

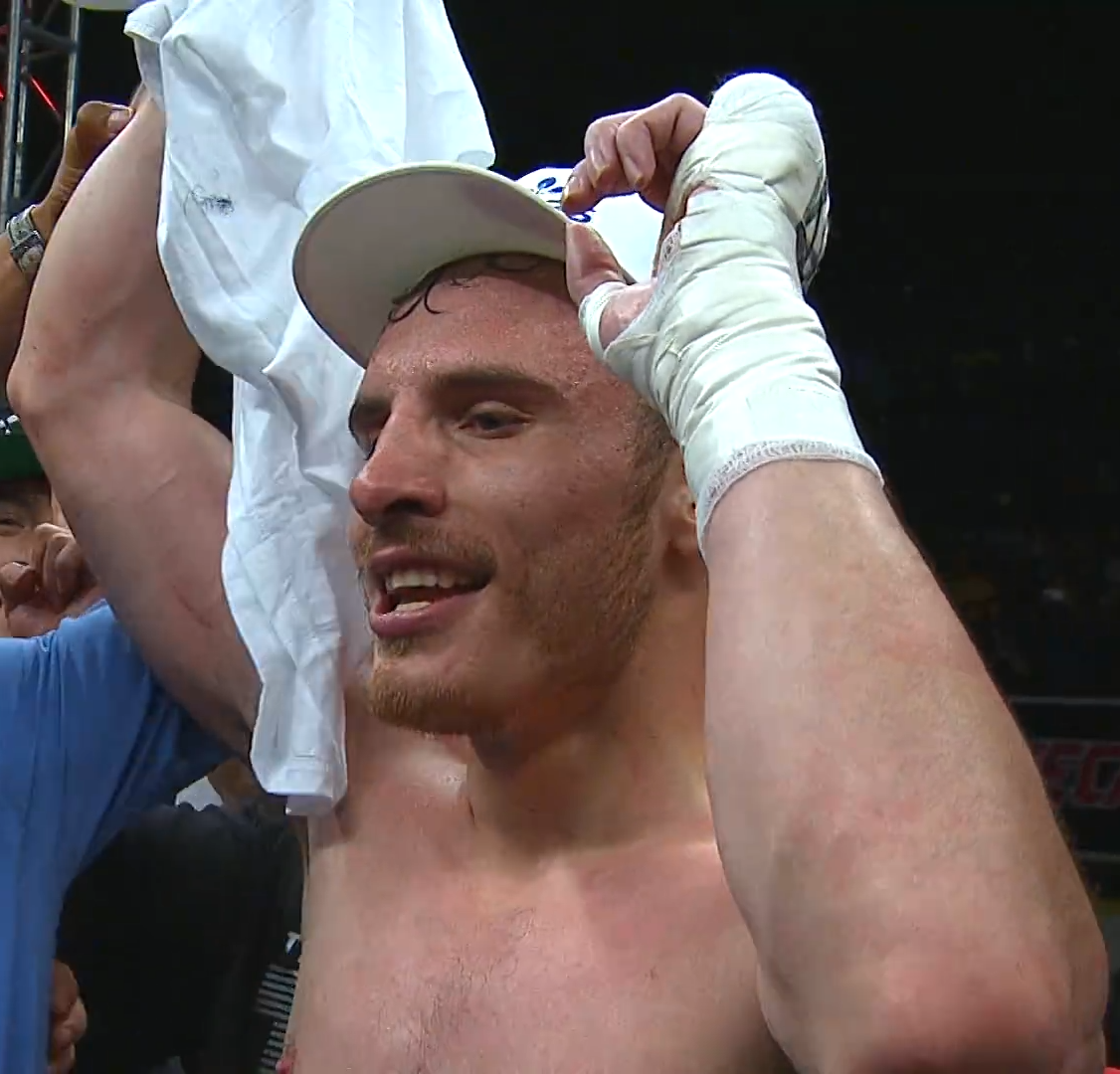

Personal information
- Nicknames: Terremoto ("Earthquake"); Businessman
- Born: Omar Alonzo Chávez Carrasco; January 4, 1990 (age 36) Culiacán, Sinaloa, Mexico
- Height: 5 ft 11 in (180 cm)
- Weight: Welterweight; Light welterweight Lightweight; Super Middleweight

Boxing career
- Reach: 74 in (188 cm)
- Stance: Orthodox

Boxing record
- Total fights: 50
- Wins: 41
- Win by KO: 28
- Losses: 8
- Draws: 1

Omar Alonso Chávez Carrasco (born January 4, 1990) is a Mexican professional boxer and the one time WBC Youth Intercontinental welterweight champion. He is the son of former three-division world champion of boxing, Julio César Chávez, and younger brother of Julio César Chávez Jr.

== Personal life ==
Omar was born in the city of Culiacán, Sinaloa, Mexico. He is the son of legendary boxing champion Julio César Chávez and his then-wife Amalia Carrasco, and brother of former middleweight champion Julio César Chávez, Jr. Omar's face became known to boxing fans when his father would take him and his older brother, Julio Jr. into the ring as children, before each of Chávez Sr.'s fights.

He also has a sister, Nicole.

== Professional career ==
On December 16, 2006, when Chávez was 16 years old he began his professional career, beating fellow debutant Jesús García with a first round knockout on the undercard which included his brother Julio in their native Culiacán. He won his next five straight fights in just over a year, four of them by knockout. Omar was signed with Bob Arum's Top Rank.

On July 18, 2009, Chávez, for the second time would face Marco Antonio Nazareth, who had won four and lost three coming into their bout. In the fourth round Nazareth had received many heavy blows and the referee decided to stop the fight. As Nazareth sat on his stool he collapsed. He was rushed to the local hospital where he underwent a three-hour operation to treat a cerebral hemorrhage, but he died four days later.

Omar has started to improve on his punching power and proved it with a 1st round K.O. of Eugenio Lopez. In September 2011, Chávez beat Alberto Martínez to win the WBC Youth Intercontinental Welterweight Championship.

On December 12, 2011, Omar Chavez faced Jorge Paez Jr, son of Jorge "Maromero" Paez. Although Chavez was looking for the knockout, Paez Jr. was more the boxer and manage to beat Chavez with a unanimous 10-round decision.

After a hiatus of two years, Chavez returned to the boxing rings in 2023, and won then and had a fight on March 31, 2024, against Muchi Zavala by second-round knockout at Tijuana.

== Professional boxing record ==
50 fights	41 wins	8 losses
By knockout	28	0
By decision	13	8
Draws	1	

Res.	Record	Opponent	Type	Rd., Time	Date	Location	Notes
Loss	36-6-1	(Mexico) Ramón Álvarez	UD	8 (8)	2021-06-19	Estádio Jalisco, Guadalajara, Mexico	
Loss	36-5-1	(Argentina) Jose Carlos Paz	UD	10 (10)	2018-05-19	(Mexico) Hotel Holiday Inn, Durango	
Loss	36-4-1	(Mexico) Roberto Garcia	UD	10 (10)	2017-08-12	Gimnasio Nuevo León Unido, Monterrey, Mexico	
Win	36-3-1	(Mexico) Ramón Álvarez	TKO	2 (10)	2017-04-29	Gimnasio Manuel Bernardo Aguirre, Chihuahua, Mexico	
Win	35-3-1	(Mexico) César Chávez	KO	1 (8)	2016-12-10	Arena Monterrey, Monterrey, Mexico	
Win	34-3-1	(United States) Hector Muñoz	MD	10 (10)	2015-06-26	(United States) Little Creek Casino Resort, Shelton, Washington, U.S.	
Win	33-3-1	(Colombia) Richard Gutierrez	UD	8 (8)	2015-04-18	(United States) StubHub Center, Carson, California, U.S.	
Loss	32-3-1	(Mexico) Ramón Álvarez	UD	10 (10)	2014-09-27	Arena Jorge Cuesy Serrano, Tuxtla Gutiérrez, Mexico	
Win	32-2-1	(Canada) Joachim Alcine	UD	10 (10)	2013-10-19	Cabo San Lucas, Mexico	
Win	31-2-1	(Mexico) Daniel Sandoval	UD	10 (10)	2014-05-03	Palenque de la Feria Ganadera, Culiacán, Mexico	
Win	30-2-1	(Venezuela) Charlie Navarro	UD	10 (10)	2013-07-06	Tepic, Mexico	
Win	29-2-1	(Venezuela) Pablo Vasquez	TKO	2 (10)	2013-03-23	Culiacán, Mexico	
Loss	28-2-1	(Mexico) Jorge Páez, Jr.	UD	10 (10)	July 21, 2012	Tijuana, Mexico	vacant WBC International Silver light middleweight title
Win	28-1-1	(Colombia) Emilio Julio Julio	RTD	9 (10)	March 22, 2012	Culiacán, Mexico	
Loss	27-1-1	(Mexico) Jorge Páez, Jr.	MD	10 (10)	December 17, 2011	Tuxtla Gutiérrez, Mexico	
Win	27-0-1	(Mexico) Alberto Martínez	TKO	1 (2:51)	September 9, 2011	Foro Promo Casa, Mexicali, Mexico	Won WBC Youth Intercontinental Welterweight title
Win	26-0-1	(Mexico) Genaro Trazancos	TKO	4 (0:52)	May 28, 2011	Palenque del FEX, Mexicali, Mexico	
Win	25-0-1	(Spain) Ignasi Caballero	KO	2 (1:34)	December 18, 2010	Campeche, Mexico	
Win	24-0-1	(Mexico) Rodrigo Juárez	KO	4 (2:47)	September 18, 2010	Estadio Banorte, Culiacán, Mexico	
Win	23-0-1	(Mexico) Miguel Galindo	KO	2 (1:09)	July 24, 2010	Polideportivo Centenario, Los Mochis, Mexico	
Win	22-0-1	(Mexico) Rodrigo Juárez	SD	8 (8)	May 5, 2010	Sports Center Fair, León, Mexico	
Win	21-0-1	(Mexico) José Arelis López	UD	6 (6)	March 3, 2010	Auditorio del Estado, Mexicali, Mexico	
Win	20-0-1	(Mexico) Eugenio López	KO	1 (1:44)	February 20, 2010	Discoteca El Alebrije, Acapulco, Mexico	
Win	19-0-1	(Mexico) Carlos Urrea	TKO	2 (2:39)	December 19, 2009	Arena Itson, Ciudad Obregón, Mexico	
Win	18-0-1	(United States) James Ventry	UD	6 (6)	October 10, 2009	(United States) Madison Square Garden, New York City, New York, U.S.	
Win	17-0-1	(Mexico) Marco Nazareth	TKO	4 (2:59)	July 18, 2009	Centro de Convenciones, Puerto Vallarta, Mexico	Nazareth died days later of injuries from this bout
Win	16-0-1	(United States) Patrick Cape	TKO	2 (2:19)	June 20, 2009	Gimnasio Oscar García, Ensenada, Mexico	
Win	15-0-1	(United States) Tyler Ziolkowski	KO	2 (1:48)	May 2, 2009	(United States) MGM Grand, Paradise, Nevada, U.S.	
Win	14-0-1	(Mexico) Rodolfo Armenta	MD	4 (4)	February 6, 2009	(United States) Maywood Activity Center, Maywood, California, U.S.	
Win	13-0-1	(United States) Brian Carden	TKO	1 (1:50)	December 13, 2008	(United States) Boardwalk Hall, Atlantic City, New Jersey, U.S.	
Win	12-0-1	(Mexico) Miguel Hernández	UD	4 (4)	September 27, 2008	Centro de Convenciones, Mérida, Mexico	
Win	11-0-1	(United States) Jeremy Marts	KO	1 (2:44)	August 2, 2008	(United States) Palms Casino Resort, Paradise, Nevada, U.S.	
Draw	10-0-1	(Mexico) Miguel Hernández	MD	4 (4)	June 21, 2008	Auditorio Municipal, Tijuana, Mexico	
Win	10-0-0	(Mexico) Juan Castíllo	KO	1 (2:59)	May 17, 2008	Plaza Monumental, Aguascalientes, Mexico	
Win	9-0-0	(Mexico) Marco Nazareth	UD	4 (4)	April 26, 2008	Plaza de Toros, Querétaro, Mexico	
Win	8-0-0	(Mexico) Antonio Valencia	TKO	3 (2:40)	March 29, 2008	Gimnasio Municipal, Ciudad Juárez, Mexico	
Win	7-0-0	(Mexico) Iván García	TKO	2 (1:32)	February 23, 2008	Viva Mexico Center, San Luis Rio Colorado, Mexico	
Win	6-0-0	(Mexico) Miguel Camacho	MD	4 (4)	February 9, 2008	Domo de la Feria, León, Mexico	
Win	5-0-0	(Mexico) Miguel Hernández	TKO	1 (1:27)	November 24, 2007	Estadio Beto Ávila, Veracruz, Mexico	
Win	4-0-0	(Mexico) Enrique Fernández	KO	1 (0:29)	May 19, 2007	Auditorio Benito Juarez, Guadalajara, Mexico	
Win	3-0-0	(Mexico) Jesús Hernández	KO	3 (1:55)	April 28, 2007	Plaza de Toros, Cozumel, Mexico	
Win	2-0-0	(Mexico) Óscar Sánchez	TKO	1 (2:49)	March 31, 2007	Centro de Cancun, Cancún, Mexico	
Win	1-0-0	(Mexico) Jesús García	KO	1 (2:00)	December 16, 2006	Plaza de Toros La Sinaloense, Culiacán, Mexico	

== See also ==
- Notable boxing families
