= Ramón Álvarez (boxer) =

Mexican boxer (born 1986)

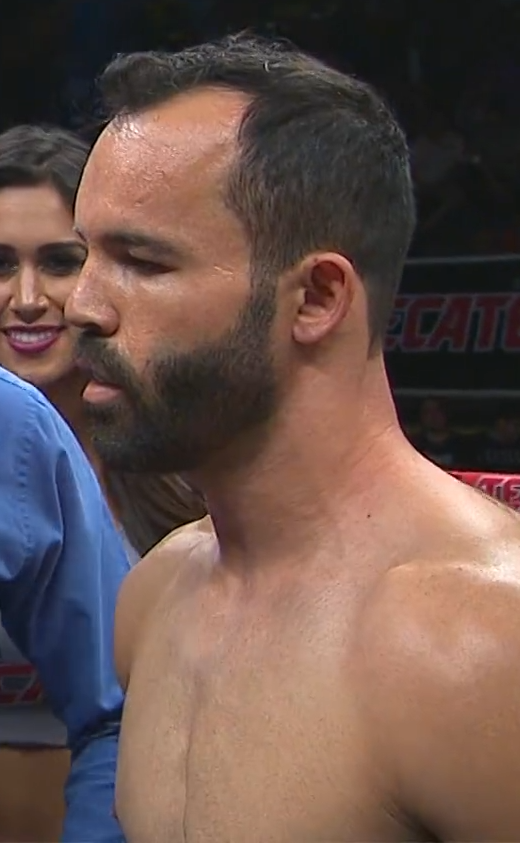

Personal information
- Nickname: Inocente
- Born: Ramón Alvarez Barragán; 9 August 1986 (age 40) Guadalajara, Jalisco, Mexico
- Height: 5 ft 8 in (173 cm)
- Weight: Welterweight; Light middleweight

Boxing career
- Reach: 68 in (173 cm)
- Stance: Orthodox

Boxing record
- Total fights: 41
- Wins: 29
- Win by KO: 16
- Losses: 8
- Draws: 3
- No contests: 1

Ramón Álvarez Barragán (born 9 August 1986) is a Mexican professional boxer.

== Professional career ==
On Saturday June 28, 2008, Ramon, who has six brothers, made world history when all of them fought on the same card. The only downside being that three of them failed to win their pro debuts. The four more experienced brothers won.

== Personal life ==
His brothers are former professional welterweight Ricardo Álvarez, four division world champion Canelo Álvarez and the former WBA World Light Middleweight Champion Rigoberto Álvarez.

== Professional boxing record ==
41 fights	29 wins	8 losses
By knockout	16	4
By decision	13	4
Draws	3	
No contests	1	

No.	Result	Record	Opponent	Type	Round, time	Date	Location	Notes
41	Win	29–8–3 (1)	(Mexico) Omar Chávez	UD	8 (8)	2021-06-19	(Mexico) Estádio Jalisco, Guadalajara, Jalisco	
40	Loss	28–8–3 (1)	(United States) Erislandy Lara	KO	2 (12)	2019-08-31	(United States) Minneapolis Armory, Minneapolis, Minnesota	For vacant WBA (Regular) light middleweight title
39	Win	28–7–3 (1)	(Argentina) José Carlos Paz	SD	10 (10)	2019-04-06	(Mexico) Arena Sonora, Hermosillo, Sonora	
38	Loss	27–7–3 (1)	(United States) Brandon Ríos	TKO	9 (10)	2018-11-17	(United States) Kansas Star Arena, Mulvane, Kansas	
37	Win	27–6–3 (1)	(Argentina) Nicolás Luques Palacios	UD	10 (10)	2018-08-25	Domo Sindicato de Trabajadores IMSS, Tlalpan, Mexico City	
36	Win	26–6–3 (1)	(Mexico) Jorge Páez Jr.	UD	10 (10)	2018-04-21	(Mexico) Domo del Parque San Rafael, Guadalajara, Jalisco	
35	Win	25–6–3 (1)	(Mexico) Johnny Navarrete	UD	10 (10)	2017-12-02	(Mexico) Domo del Parque San Rafael, Guadalajara, Jalisco	
34	Draw	24–6–3 (1)	(Mexico) Johnny Navarrete	SD	8 (8)	2017-09-02	(Mexico) Gimnasio Manuel Bernardo Aguirre, Chihuahua, Chihuahua	
33	Loss	24–6–2 (1)	(Mexico) Omar Chávez	TKO	2 (10)	2017-04-29	(Mexico) Gimnasio Manuel Bernardo Aguirre, Chihuahua, Chihuahua	
32	Win	24–5–2 (1)	(United States) Matthew Strode	TKO	4 (10)	2016-12-17	(Mexico) El Foro Chiapas, Tuxtla Gutiérrez, Chiapas	
31	Loss	23–5–2 (1)	(Mexico) Antonio Margarito	SD	10 (10)	2016-08-13	(Mexico) Centro de Convenciones, Rosarito, Baja California	
30	Win	23–4–2 (1)	(United States) James Winchester	TKO	9 (10)	2016-01-30	(Mexico) Centro de Convenciones, Rosarito, Baja California	
29	Win	22–4–2 (1)	(Ghana) Ben Tackie	TKO	4 (10)	2015-10-10	Arena Ciudad de México, Mexico City	
28	NC	21–4–2 (1)	(Colombia) Richard Gutiérrez	NC	4 (10)	2015-07-04	(Mexico) Centro de Usos Multiple, Hermosillo, Sonora	
27	Win	21–4–2	(Guyana) Vivian Harris	KO	7 (12)	2014-11-29	(Mexico) Módulo Comude, San Miguel de Allende, Guanajuato	
26	Win	20–4–2	(Mexico) Omar Chávez	UD	10 (10)	2014-09-27	(Mexico) Palenque de la Feria, Tuxtla Gutiérrez, Chiapas	Won NABO light middleweight title
25	Win	19–4–2	(Mexico) Rodrigo Mejía Ortiz	TKO	9 (10)	2014-06-28	(Mexico) Centro de Espectáculos, Epazoyucan, Hidalgo	
24	Win	18–4–2	(Mexico) Esau Herrera de la Cruz	KO	5 (10)	2014-03-01	World Trade Center Mexiquense, Naucalpan de Juárez, Mexico City	
23	Win	17–4–2	(Mexico) Luis Cruz	TKO	2 (10)	2014-01-04	(Mexico) Polideportivo Río de Janeiro, Guadalajara, Jalisco	
22	Win	16–4–2	(Mexico) Erick Mireles	TKO	6 (8)	2013-08-24	(Mexico) Lienzo Charro Los Tamaulipecos, Reynosa, Tamaulipas	Won WBC United States (USNBC) Silver Welterweight Title
21	Win	15–4–2	(Mexico) Marco Hernández	KO	5 (10)	2013-07-06	(Mexico) Auditorio General Arteaga, Querétaro, Querétaro	
20	Loss	14–4–2	(Mexico) Mario Alberto Lozano	UD	12 (12)	2012-10-20	(Mexico) Chihuahua University, Chihuahua	
19	Win	14–3–2	(Nicaragua) Cristian Ruiz	UD	10 (10)	2012-06-23	(Mexico) Gimnasio Miguel Hidalgo, Puebla	
18	Win	13–3–2	(Mexico) Andres Delfin Rodriguez	TKO	1 (10)	2012-06-02	(Mexico) Arandas Municipal Auditorium, Arandas	
17	Win	12–3–2	(Mexico) Francisco Javier Reza	UD	8 (8)	2011-07-30	(Mexico) Plaza de Toros Nuevo Progreso, Guadalajara	
16	Win	11–3–2	(Mexico) Alejandro Valladares	SD	10 (10)	2011-06-04	(Mexico) Modelo Center, La Paz	
15	Win	10–3–2	(Mexico) Edgar Arroyo	UD	10 (10)	2011-04-15	(Mexico) Arena Jalisco, Guadalajara	
14	Draw	9–3–2	(Mexico) Alejandro Valladares	MD	12 (12)	2010-12-10	(Mexico) Gimnasio Auditorio Jorge Campos, La Paz	
13	Win	9–3–1	(Mexico) Horacio Rodriguez	UD	8 (8)	2010-11-12	(Mexico) Collage Club, Puerto Vallarta	
12	Win	8–3–1	(Mexico) Juan Carlos Marquez	UD	6 (6)	2010-08-28	(Mexico) Lobo Dome, Mazatlan	
11	Loss	7–3–1	(Mexico) Daniel Sandoval	TKO	2 (12)	2010-07-10	(Mexico) Arena VFG, Guadalajara	
10	Win	7–2–1	(Mexico) Jesus Romero	KO	2 (8)	2010-06-19	(Mexico) Mesón de los Deportes, Tepic	
9	Win	6–2–1	(Mexico) Leonardo Cordoba	TKO	3 (8)	2010-05-29	(Mexico) Arena Tecate, Guadalajara	
8	Win	5–2–1	(Mexico) Angel Escamilla	MD	10 (10)	2010-02-27	(Mexico) Coliseo Olimpico de la UG, Guadalajara	
7	Win	4–2–1	(Mexico) Jesus Aceves	TKO	3 (8)	2009-10-31	(Mexico) Plaza de toros, Magdalena	
6	Win	3–2–1	(Mexico) Rigoberto Casillas	TKO	3 (6)	2008-11-28	(Mexico) Arena Jalisco, Guadalajara	
5	Loss	2–2–1	(Mexico) Jesus Aceves	PTS	6 (6)	2008-11-07	(Mexico) Arena Jalisco, Guadalajara	
4	Draw	2–1–1	(Mexico) Jaime Hernandez	SD	6 (6)	2008-10-04	(Mexico) Coliseo Olimpico de la UG, Guadalajara	
3	Win	2–1	(Mexico) Wily Medina	TKO	3 (4)	2008-06-28	(Mexico) Palenque Calle 2, Zapopan	
2	Win	1–1	(Mexico) Hugo Martinez	KO	1 (4)	2008-02-29	(Mexico) Coliseo Olimpico de la UG, Guadalajara	
1	Loss	0–1	(Mexico) Agustin Marquez	UD	4 (4)	2008-01-25	(Mexico) Gimnasio Usos Múltiples UdeG, Guadalajara	

== See also ==
- Notable boxing families
