= Julio César Chávez Jr. =

Mexican boxer (born 1986)

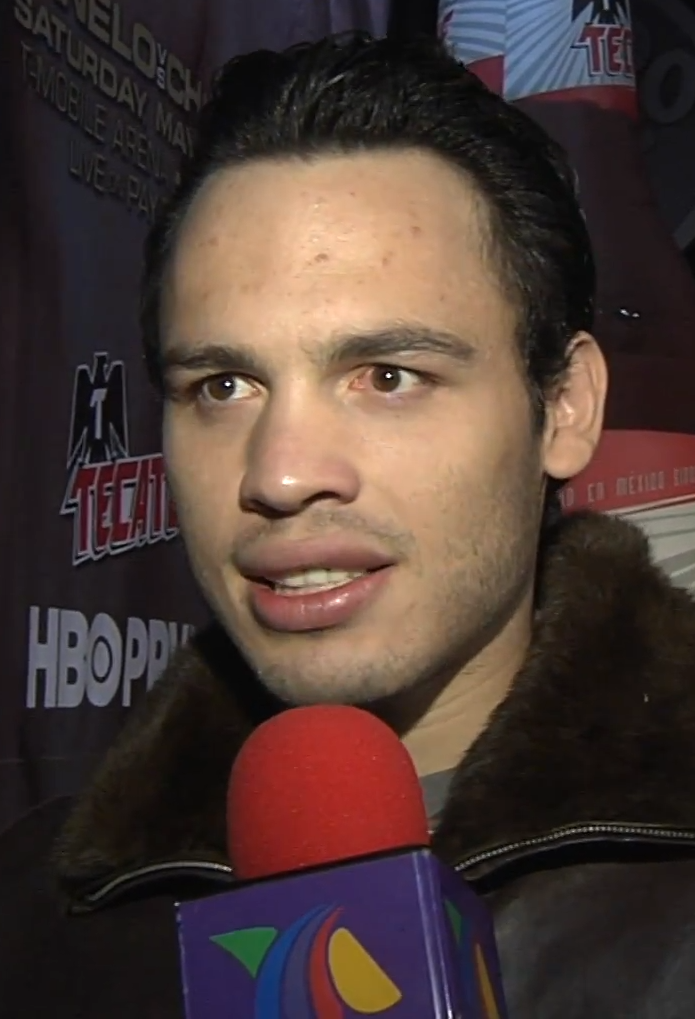
- Chávez in 2017

Personal information
- Nicknames: La Leyenda Continua ("The Legend Continues"); El hijo de la leyenda ("The Son of the Legend")
- Born: Julio César Chávez Carrasco; 16 February 1986 (age 40) Culiacán, Sinaloa, Mexico
- Height: 6 ft 0 in (183 cm)
- Weight: Light middleweight; Middleweight; Super middleweight; Light heavyweight; Cruiserweight

Boxing career
- Reach: 73 in (185 cm)
- Stance: Orthodox

Boxing record
- Total fights: 66
- Wins: 57
- Win by KO: 37
- Losses: 7
- Draws: 1
- No contests: 1

Julio César Chávez Carrasco (born 16 February 1986), better known as Julio César Chávez Jr., is a Mexican professional boxer who held the WBC middleweight title from 2011 to 2012. He is the son of former three-division world champion of boxing Julio César Chávez.

Chávez Jr. is the older brother of Omar Chávez. He also has a younger sister, Nicole.

== Early and personal life ==
Chávez Jr. was born in the state of Sinaloa, when his father held the WBC World Championship at super featherweight. He rose to prominence as a child, when his father would take him and his brother Omar into the ring as children before each of his fights. When he was a teenager, his parents divorced.

He has been married to Frida Muñoz, the mother of a granddaughter of former Sinaloa Cartel head Joaquin "El Chapo" Guzman.

=== Legal issues ===
In 2012, Chávez Jr. was convicted for driving under influence in Los Angeles and sentenced to 13 days in prison. In 2024, he was arrested on possessing two AR-style ghost rifles, but was released on a $50,000 bond and the condition that he would undergo drug rehabilitation treatment.

On 2 July 2025, Chávez Jr. was arrested by United States Immigration and Customs Enforcement officials in Studio City. He was processed for deportation as he had an active arrest warrant in Mexico since 2023 due to his alleged involvement with the Sinaloa Cartel. According to a 2019 investigation by the Attorney General of Mexico Alejandro Gertz Manero, the cartel head of security Néstor Isidro Pérez Salas ordered Chávez Jr. to assault drug traffickers for their failures. President Claudia Sheinbaum said he had not been arrested in Mexico because he spent most of his time in the United States. On 19 August 2025, it was reported that Chávez Jr. was deported to Mexico and jailed in Hermosillo, Sonora. He was later released on bail to await trial outside of custody.

== Amateur career ==
Chávez's amateur career consisted of only two fights against former world champion Jorge Páez's oldest son Jorge Páez Jr.; both of the exhibitions bouts were shown on Mexican television.

== Professional career ==
=== Early career ===
After those amateur fights, Chávez Jr. started his professional boxing career at 17 years old. On 26 September 2003, at Super Featherweight (130 lbs), he won his professional debut by outpointing Jonathan Hernandez over six rounds in Chávez Jr.'s native Culiacán, Sinaloa. Chávez Jr. was signed with Bob Arum's Top Rank. Many of his fights have been held during boxing programs that have been headed by his father; he has also been featured on the undercards of many major pay-per-view fights (rare for an up-and-coming fighter, but not unexpected in his case given his father's fame). He is considerably taller than his father. Chávez Jr. set a fighting pace that was reminiscent of Chávez Sr.'s own pace when the latter was a younger man: in 2004, he fought eleven times, not having a fight only in August during that year.

Chávez won by a split decision over Matt Vanda 12 July 2008. Scores for the fight were 97–93 and 100–90, while losing 96–95 on another card. Chávez struggled with making weight for several bouts and was suspended following his win over Troy Rowland for using a banned diuretic, furosemide, to make the 160-pound weight limit. As a result, the fight was changed to a no contest.

=== Middleweight ===
On 26 June 2010, at the Alamodome in San Antonio, Chávez Jr. had a win against John Duddy, in what many regard as his first serious fight.

In December 2010, Alfonso Gómez was signed to match up against the undefeated Chávez Jr. at middleweight (the contracted weight was 157) for Chávez Jr.'s WBC Silver Middleweight belt on the In Harm's Way card as the main event. However, during training for the bout, Alfonso tore some ligaments in his left elbow and had to withdraw from the card and undergo a few months of rehab. For his part, Chávez Jr. was set to fight Paweł Wolak as a replacement bout, but after adjusting the weight limit for said match to 165 lbs, Chávez Jr. had to pull out due to the flu messing up his training and weight loss and then in January he went on to beat title contender Billy Lyell.

==== Chávez Jr. vs. Zbik ====
On 4 June 2011, Chávez defeated WBC Middleweight Champion Sebastian Zbik to win his first world title at the Staples Center in Los Angeles, California, taking a major step toward establishing his own legacy while his famous father looked on. He was behind early against Zbik, who was the quicker fighter and landed more punches early. But Chávez kept coming forward, countering with hard body shots that seemed to slow his German opponent down. The fight drew 1.5 million viewers on HBO: Boxing After Dark making it the most viewed since 2007 when Paulie Malignaggi fought Lovemore Ndou.

==== Chávez Jr. vs. Manfredo Jr. ====
Chávez Jr. successfully defended his Middleweight title with a fifth-round knockout of Peter Manfredo Jr. in Houston on 19 November 2011.

Chávez was marginally outworked, but he landed a higher percentage of punches and more power shots than Manfredo. In the fifth round, Chávez hurt Manfredo with a hard right hand and unloaded a flurry when the challenger wobbled and backed up on the ropes. He didn't answer with any punches and referee Laurence Cole finally stepped in to call it at 1 minutes, 52 seconds. The fight averaged 1.5 million viewers on HBO.

==== Chávez Jr. vs. Rubio ====
On 4 February 2012, at the Alamodome in San Antonio, Texas, Chávez faced Mexican countryman Marco Antonio Rubio in a 12-round scheduled championship Middleweight bout. Chávez Jr. retained his WBC Middleweight title after beating Rubio by a unanimous decision. Chávez bossed the majority of the exchanges and was awarded the fight 118–110 116–112 115–113 on the judges' scorecards. Chavez landed 237 of 560 punches thrown (42%) whilst Rubio connected 201 of 962 punches (21%). The fight was watched by 19 million viewers in Mexico. In the US, the fight was shown live on HBO: Boxing After Dark and averaged 1.9 million viewers.

Two weeks before the fight, Chávez was arrested in Los Angeles on charges of drunk driving.

==== Chávez Jr. vs. Lee ====
On 16 June 2012, at the University of Texas at El Paso, Sunbowl in El Paso, Texas. Chávez Jr. recovered from a slow start he blamed on leg cramps and stopped Andy Lee at 2:21 of the seventh round to retain the WBC Middleweight title. A right uppercut by Chávez snapped Lee's head upwards and sideways and Chávez connected on a barrage of punches before referee Laurence Cole intervened and waved an end to the fight. The fight averaged 1.6 million viewers on HBO.

With the victory, Chávez put himself in position for a title-unification fight with recognized World Middleweight Champion Sergio Martinez.

==== Chávez Jr. vs. Martínez ====
A deal was reached for Chávez and Sergio Martínez (49–2–2, 28 KOs) to fight on 15 September 2012, at the Thomas & Mack Center in Las Vegas for the unified WBC and The Ring Middleweight Championship.

Martínez outworked and out-landed Chávez throughout the first 11 rounds of the fight in dominating fashion. Though Chávez had his moments, trapping Martínez in the corner on the ropes, Martínez fought Chávez and used his fast lateral movement to avoid and neutralize Chávez's offensive attack. After 11 dominant rounds from Martinez, Chávez hurt Martínez in the twelfth round, sending him to the canvas halfway through the round. Martínez got up with a little over one minute left in the fight and continued to throw and trade with the Mexican champion, despite being fatigued and clearly hurt. Martínez managed to survive the 12th round. Martínez won the fight by unanimous decision, by the scores of 117–110, 118–109 and 118–109. It was later revealed that Martinez had fought with a broken left hand since the fourth round. A total of 16,939 tickets were sold to generate a live gate of $3,052,475. HBO reported the fight generated 475,000 pay-per-view buys and close to $25 million in revenue. Chávez Jr. received a purse of $3 million, compared to Martinez's $1.4m.

After the fight, Chávez tested positive for cannabis. On 28 February 2013, the Nevada State Athletic Commission suspended him for nine months and fined him $900,000. Chávez had been already fined $20,000 and suspended indefinitely by the World Boxing Council.

=== Light heavyweight ===
==== Chávez Jr. vs. Vera I ====
After a year of suspension, Chávez faced Brian Vera on 28 September 2013 at the StubHub Center in Carson, California. Chávez struggled with the weight before the fight weighed in at 172 pounds for a fight contracted in 168 pounds. The night of the fight he weighed 186 pounds. Like the fight against Martínez, Chávez threw very few power punches while Vera dominated the fight. In the late rounds, although Chávez landed the harder punches throughout the fight. Chávez won a controversial unanimous decision. He threw 320 punches, while Vera threw 734. The decision was heavily criticized by the audience. After the fight, Chávez stated that he fought with an injured hand.

=== Super-middleweight ===
==== Chávez Jr. vs. Vera II ====
A rematch was held on 1 March 2014, at the Alamodome of San Antonio, Texas. Contrary to what happened in the first fight, Chávez came out more aggressive and proposed the fight. He kept the distance with the jab and landed power punches. In the eleventh round he landed a powerful right hand that nearly knocked Vera out. Chávez won via unanimous decision claiming the vacant WBC Continental Americas super middleweight title.

=== Return to light heavyweight ===
==== Chávez Jr. vs. Fonfara ====
After a long break from boxing, Chávez Jr. decided to face Andrzej Fonfara, a bout in which Chávez was dominated and dropped by a left hook to the forehead in the 9th round. The fight took place on 18 April 2015 at the StubHub Center, Carson, California. Before the 10th round begun Chávez told his corner "Stop the fight" making it his first TKO in his career. After fight Chávez said "Yes, I think I won the fight". Some words were lost in translation; he meant to say he felt he was winning the fight at early stages of the bout. Chávez was behind in all three judges score cards at the time of the stoppage.

=== Catchweight fights ===
==== Chávez Jr. vs. Reyes ====
Chávez announced that he would be returning on 18 July 2015 against fellow Mexican Marcos Reyes (33–2, 24 KOs) at the Don Haskins Convention Center in El Paso, Texas, in a 10-round super-middleweight bout. Due to Chávez not making weight the fight time, a catchweight of 170 pounds was established. Chávez was fighting for the first time with renowned trainer Robert Garcia. Chávez won a unanimous decision over Reyes with scores off 97–92, 98–91, 96–93. Reyes started each round with more activity and by landing shots. However, Chávez landed three or four heavy shots that moved Reyes' entire body. The punches seemed to stun Reyes and gave Chávez control of the rounds. The pro Chávez crowd began to jeer his performance during and after the fight.

==== Chávez Jr. vs. Britsch ====
In October 2016, it was announced that Chávez Jr. would be making a return on 10 December 2016 at the Monterrey Arena in Mexico against German boxer Dominik Britsch (32–2–1, 11 KOs). A catchweight of 169 pounds was agreed by both fighters. Chávez confirmed he would be trained by his uncle, Rodolfo Chávez. With a win here, Chávez Jr. would look to fight Canelo Álvarez next. Chávez Jr. officially weighed in at 168 pounds, the limit for super middleweight.

Chávez Jr. picked up his 50th win of his career after defeating Britsch in a one-sided 10 round unanimous decision in front of a very small crowd in Mexico. All three judges scored it 99–91 in favor of Chávez. In the post fight interview, Chávez called out Canelo and Gennady Golovkin, "I am happy with the win and my performance. I am ready to come back in two or three months. I don't need another fight. I am ready for a world title fight with anybody or any other big fight."

==== Chávez Jr. vs. Álvarez ====
Negotiations began soon after for a potential HBO PPV fight to take place between Chávez and Canelo Álvarez in 2017 on the Cinco de Mayo weekend, as there was interest from both sides that a fight take place. Golden Boy Promotions president Eric Gomez confirmed a catchweight of 165 lbs was agreed between both sides. WBC president Mauricio Sulaiman was on board and said it was a "very attractive fight." and would likely get his organization involved in the fight.

Julio César Chávez spoke on 18 December about the ongoing negotiations saying Golden Boy were offering his son a small amount for the potential big PPV fight. He went on to claim his son was offered a $5m purse with no mention he would get a cut of the PPV revenue, a counter offer was submitted. A rematch clause was also discussed, which Chávez Jr. and his team had no problem with. Chávez Sr. went on to admit that he was fully aware Álvarez is the A-side in the fight, and would settle for no less than 30–35% of the full revenue. On 24 December, Álvarez and his team gave Chávez a week to accept the terms, which included a purse of $7m, or he would consider other options. On 12 January 2017 De La Hoya and Álvarez called for the contract to be signed, which was supposedly sent to Al Haymon, who advises Chávez Jr. and urged him to sign it. A day later, Chávez Jr. claimed he had agreed all the demands set by Álvarez and was said that he would sign the contract. According to Chávez Jr. the new demands included a weight limit set at 164.5 pounds and a $6 million base purse plus PPV revenue percentages.

On 13 January, Álvarez officially confirmed the fight to take place on 6 May 2017. A rematch clause was also put in place if Chávez Jr. wins the fight and another clause for every pound Chávez Jr. weighs over the limit, he would be fined $1 million. On 4 February, Golden Boy Promotions announced that the fight would take place at the T-Mobile Arena in Paradise, Nevada. The fight was announced a sell out on 3 March with 20,000 tickets being sold after they initially went on sale to the public on 20 February.

According to the Nevada State Athletic Commission, it was reported that Álvarez would earn $5 million and Chávez would earn $3 million before any shares of PPV. The figures would increase based on PPV sales.

In front of a sold-out crowd of 20,510, Chávez lost the fight by a shutout unanimous decision. All three judges scored it 120-108 for Álvarez. Chávez was very cautious throughout the fight. At times, he came forward and also had Álvarez against the ropes, but failed to throw any punches. This led to jeers from the crowd in the later rounds due to lack of action. Chávez spoke to HBO's Max Kellerman in the post fight interview, "Speed and distance was a problem. He's a good fighter, very fast and very consistent. Canelo beat me. He beat me at the distance. He is a very active fighter. He's very good, and he beat me." CompuBox Stats showed that Álvarez landed 228 of 604 his punches thrown (38%) and Chávez landed 71 of 302 (24%). By the end of round 5, Álvarez landed 102 punches compared to Chávez's 25 landed. Chávez admitted he should have thrown more, but his corner was telling him to be aware of Álvarez's counter punches. Early figures revealed that the fight generated at least 1 million buys. A replay was shown on regular HBO a week later and drew an average of 769,000 viewers.

This was the first boxing match to generate over 1 million PPV buys that didn't include Mayweather, Pacquiao or De La Hoya since 2002, which saw Lennox Lewis retain his heavyweight world titles against Mike Tyson. Later sources confirmed the fight did close to 1.2 million buys, which means it would have generated around $80 million.

=== Return to super middleweight ===
Following the loss to Alvarez, Chávez Jr. said he would be making a full comeback at 168 pounds in the super middleweight division. He said he would fight again towards the end of 2017, most likely December. A potential name he had mentioned was former WBA 'regular' middleweight champion Daniel Jacobs. On 23 July, Chavez Jr. tweeted that he could return as soon as October 2017 and named Martin Murray (35–4–1,16 KOs) as a potential opponent.

Chavez Jr. on 17 September, announced that he would fight at the full super middleweight limit of 168 pounds against former WBC champion Anthony Dirrell (30–1–1, 24 KOs) at The Forum in Los Angeles, California, on 11 November 2017. Three days later, Dirrell spoke out on his local Michigan paper, Mlive, saying "Don't believe that," immediately denying that he had agreed to fight Chavez Jr. On 10 October, trainer Nacho Beristain stated that Chavez would return in December 2017. On 24 October, Beristain revealed that he could not get in touch with Chavez Jr. regarding their training camp. A new date of 16 December was considered for his new return date to the ring. Beristain stated that Chavez was returning to his hold training habits. He told ESPN Deportes that if he did not hear from Chavez in the next 10 days, he would not be working his corner. On 14 November 2017, fellow Mexican Alfredo Angulo (24–6, 20 KOs) was named as a possible opponent as both boxers being advised by Al Haymon. Chavez told ESPN Deportes that he had hoped to reach an agreement with Beristain to work his corner.

A year later, after announcing different return dates which included August 2018, on 14 November, the return of Chavez Jr. was finally announced to take place on 1 December 2018 at the Staples Center in Los Angeles against Alfredo Angulo in a 10-round bout. The fight would take place on the Deontay Wilder vs. Tyson Fury Showtime PPV undercard. Chavez Jr. stated he would campaign at super middleweight and pursue a world title in 2019. On 25 November, there appeared to be some doubt on whether the fight would actually take place. Sources indicated Chavez Jr. had not 'complied with the necessary medical exam requirements' and thus unable to obtain the necessary license. The fight was cancelled a day later as Chávez Sr stated his son was not ready to return.

On 10 August 2019, Chavez finally made his return to the ring after not having boxed for 2 years and 3 months and knocked out unrecognized Colombian Evert Bravo (25–10–1 with 9/10 losses coming by KO) in the 1st round in front of a crowd of 6,000 fans at the Antonio R. Márquez Stadium in San Juan de los Lagos, Jalisco.

Chavez was then brought to much controversy, after he was then scheduled to face Daniel Jacobs in Las Vegas. A month before the fight, he did not make weight and was fined and the fight was pushed back to December. On 20 December in Phoenix, Chavez lost to Jacobs via a Round 5 TKO after claiming, "his nose was broken and couldn’t breathe", and also to a broken hand. This sparked outrage due to Chavez "quitting on his terms", resulting in fans throwing trash and beer into the ring and at Chavez Jr., and at major stars such as former heavyweight champion Andy Ruiz Jr., the middleweight champion Canelo Alvarez and even Chávez' father. July 2020 he gets an indefinite suspension for failing to provide a drug test in December 2019 fight.

=== Light heavyweight ===
==== Chavez Jr vs. Cazares ====
He was scheduled to face Mario Abel Cazares on 25 September 2020, with the bout serving as part of the undercard for an exhibition match between Chávez' father and former four-weight world champion Jorge Arce. Chavez lost the fight via technical decision, after he was pulled out of the fight in the sixth round, due to a bad cut from an alleged headbutt from Cazares.

==== Chavez Jr vs. Minda ====
In his next fight, on 27 November 2020, Chávez Jr faced Jeyson Minda. Chávez Jr dropped Minda in the second, third and fourth round. The last knockdown prompted Minda's corner to stop the fight early, and earn Chávez Jr a TKO win.

==== Chavez Jr vs. Silva ====
In March 2021, it was announced that Chávez Jr would face former UFC Middleweight Champion Anderson Silva on 19 June 2021. Chávez Jr missed the contractual weight of 182 lbs. after weighing in at 184.4 lbs. and forfeited $100,000 of his purse to Silva. Despite the massive difference in experience in records of 52–5–1 (34 KOs) to Silva's 1–1 (1 KO) in boxing, Chavez Jr lost the fight via split decision, being outstruck throughout the fight.

=== Cruiserweight ===
==== Chavez Jr vs. Hall ====
Chávez Jr was scheduled to face former UFC title contender Darren Till, on the Jake Paul vs. Mike Tyson card on 20 July 2024 in a six-round cruiserweight bout. However, due to Mike Tyson having an ulcer flareup, the event was postponed and took place on 15 November 2024.

A separate event took place on 20 July 2024 at the Jake Paul vs. Mike Perry card and Chávez Jr faced former UFC fighter Uriah Hall. Chávez Jr won the bout by unanimous decision.

==== Chavez Jr vs. Paul ====
Chávez Jr. lost a ten-round unanimous decision to American influencer-turned-boxer Jake Paul on 29 June 2025 at cruiserweight in Anaheim, California, with scorecards of 99–91, 98–92 and 97–93.

==== Chávez Jr. vs. Julian Sacco ====
Chávez Jr. stopped Argentine boxer Angel Julian Sacco at 2:46 of round four on 24 January 2026, competing at light-heavyweight at Arena Coliseo in San Luis Potosí, Mexico.

==== Chávez Jr. vs. Caicedo ====
On 25 April 2026, Chávez Jr. defeated Jhon Caicedo by third-round technical knockout at the Adolfo López Mateos Baseball Stadium in Reynosa, Tamaulipas, Mexico.

== Professional boxing record ==
66 fights	57 wins	7 losses
By knockout	37	2
By decision	20	5
Draws	1	
No contests	1	

No.	Result	Record	Opponent	Type	Round, time	Date	Location	Notes
66	Win	57–7–1 (1)	Jeison Troncoso	KO	1 (10), 2:59	12 Sep 2026	Puebla, Gimnasio Miguel Hidalgo, Mexico	
65	Win	56–7–1 (1)	Jhon Caicedo	KO	3 (10), 0:23	25 Apr 2026	Reynosa, Tamaulipas, Mexico	
64	Win	55–7–1 (1)	Angel Julian	TKO	4 (10), 2:46	24 Jan 2026	Arena Coliseo, San Luis Potosi, Mexico	
63	Loss	54–7–1 (1)	Jake Paul	UD	10	28 Jun 2025	Honda Center, Anaheim, California, U.S.	
62	Win	54–6–1 (1)	Uriah Hall	UD	6	20 Jul 2024	Amalie Arena, Tampa, Florida, U.S.	
61	Win	53–6–1 (1)	David Zegarra	UD	10	18 Dec 2021	Palenque de la Feria Ganadera, Culiacan, Mexico	
60	Loss	52–6–1 (1)	Anderson Silva	SD	8	19 Jun 2021	Estadio Jalisco, Guadalajara, Mexico	
59	Win	52–5–1 (1)	Jeyson Minda	TKO	4 (10), 2:55	27 Nov 2020	Parque Revolucion, Culiacán, Mexico	
58	Loss	51–5–1 (1)	Mario Abel Cazares	TD	6 (10), 0:41	25 Sep 2020	Grand Hotel, Tijuana, Mexico	
57	Loss	51–4–1 (1)	Daniel Jacobs	RTD	5 (12), 3:00	20 Dec 2019	Talking Stick Resort Arena, Phoenix, Arizona, U.S.	
56	Win	51–3–1 (1)	Evert Bravo	KO	1 (10), 1:22	10 Aug 2019	Salon Diamante Premier, San Juan de los Lagos, Mexico	
55	Loss	50–3–1 (1)	Canelo Álvarez	UD	12	6 May 2017	T-Mobile Arena, Paradise, Nevada, U.S.	
54	Win	50–2–1 (1)	Dominik Britsch	UD	10	10 Dec 2016	Monterrey Arena, Monterrey, Mexico	
53	Win	49–2–1 (1)	Marcos Reyes	UD	10	18 Jul 2015	Don Haskins Center, El Paso, Texas, U.S.	
52	Loss	48–2–1 (1)	Andrzej Fonfara	RTD	9 (12), 3:00	18 Apr 2015	StubHub Center, Carson, California, U.S.	For vacant WBC International light heavyweight title
51	Win	48–1–1 (1)	Brian Vera	UD	12	1 Mar 2014	Alamodome, San Antonio, Texas, U.S.	Won vacant WBC Continental Americas super middleweight title
50	Win	47–1–1 (1)	Brian Vera	UD	10	28 Sep 2013	StubHub Center, Carson, California, U.S.	
49	Loss	46–1–1 (1)	Sergio Martínez	UD	12	15 Sep 2012	Thomas & Mack Center, Paradise, Nevada, U.S.	Lost WBC middleweight title; For The Ring middleweight title
48	Win	46–0–1 (1)	Andy Lee	TKO	7 (12), 2:21	16 Jun 2012	Sun Bowl, El Paso, Texas, U.S.	Retained WBC middleweight title - Failed drug test afterward
47	Win	45–0–1 (1)	Marco Antonio Rubio	UD	12	4 Feb 2012	Alamodome, San Antonio, Texas, U.S.	Retained WBC middleweight title
46	Win	44–0–1 (1)	Peter Manfredo Jr.	TKO	5 (12), 1:52	19 Nov 2011	Reliant Arena, Houston, Texas, U.S.	Retained WBC middleweight title
45	Win	43–0–1 (1)	Sebastian Zbik	MD	12	4 Jun 2011	Staples Center, Los Angeles, California, U.S.	Won WBC middleweight title
44	Win	42–0–1 (1)	Billy Lyell	UD	10	29 Jan 2011	Estadio Banorte, Culiacán, Mexico	Retained WBC Silver middleweight title
43	Win	41–0–1 (1)	John Duddy	UD	12	26 Jun 2010	Alamodome, San Antonio, Texas, U.S.	Won vacant WBC Silver middleweight title
42	NC	40–0–1 (1)	Troy Rowland	UD	10	14 Nov 2009	MGM Grand Garden Arena, Paradise, Nevada, U.S.	Originally a UD win for Chávez Jr., later ruled an NC after he failed a drug test
41	Win	40–0–1	Jason LeHoullier	TKO	1 (10), 2:43	12 Sep 2009	Palenque de La Feria, Tepic, Mexico	Retained WBC Latino super welterweight title
40	Win	39–0–1	Luciano Cuello	UD	10	28 Mar 2009	Bullring by the Sea, Tijuana, Mexico	Won WBC Latino super welterweight title
39	Win	38–0–1	Matt Vanda	UD	10	1 Nov 2008	Mandalay Bay Events Center, Paradise, Nevada, U.S.	
38	Win	37–0–1	Matt Vanda	SD	10	12 Jul 2008	Palenque ExpoGan, Hermosillo, Mexico	
37	Win	36–0–1	Tobia Giuseppe Loriga	KO	9 (10), 1:47	26 Apr 2008	Plaza de Toros Santa María, Querétaro City, Mexico	Retained WBC Continental Americas super welterweight title
36	Win	35–0–1	José Celaya	TKO	8 (12), 2:14	9 Feb 2008	Domo de la Feria, León, Mexico	Won WBC Continental Americas super welterweight title
35	Win	34–0–1	Ray Sánchez	KO	6 (10), 1:33	1 Dec 2007	Tingley Coliseum, Albuquerque, New Mexico, U.S.	
34	Win	33–0–1	Louis Brown	TKO	5 (10), 2:42	4 Aug 2007	Allstate Arena, Rosemont, Illinois, U.S.	
33	Win	32–0–1	Grover Wiley	KO	3 (10), 2:27	9 Jun 2007	Madison Square Garden, New York City, New York, U.S.	
32	Win	31–0–1	Anthony Shuler	KO	2 (10), 1:32	14 Apr 2007	Alamodome, San Antonio, Texas, U.S.	
31	Win	30–0–1	Raúl Jorge Muñoz	TKO	3 (10), 1:29	9 Mar 2007	Dodge Arena, Hidalgo, Texas, U.S.	
30	Win	29–0–1	Christian Solano	UD	10	16 Dec 2006	Plaza de Toros, Culiacán, Mexico	
29	Win	28–0–1	Shad Howard	RTD	4 (8), 0:10	23 Sep 2006	Dodge Arena, Hidalgo, Texas, U.S.	
28	Win	27–0–1	Jermaine White	TKO	4 (10), 1:52	19 Aug 2006	Don Haskins Center, El Paso, Texas, U.S.	Won vacant WBC Youth super welterweight title
27	Win	26–0–1	Aaron Drake	TKO	2 (6), 1:53	10 Jun 2006	Madison Square Garden, New York City, New York, U.S.	
26	Win	25–0–1	Tyler Ziolkowski	KO	2 (6), 2:40	8 Apr 2006	Thomas & Mack Center, Paradise, Nevada, U.S.	
25	Win	24–0–1	Carlos Molina	MD	6	18 Feb 2006	The New Aladdin, Paradise, Nevada, U.S.	
24	Draw	23–0–1	Carlos Molina	PTS	6	16 Dec 2005	Monterrey Arena, Monterrey, Mexico	
23	Win	23–0	Jeremy Stiers	TKO	5 (6), 0:47	8 Oct 2005	Thomas & Mack Center, Paradise, Nevada, U.S.	
22	Win	22–0	Corey Alarcon	TKO	2 (6), 0:35	17 Sep 2005	America West Arena, Phoenix, Arizona, U.S.	
21	Win	21–0	Jonathan Nelson	KO	1 (6), 0:54	12 Aug 2005	Entertainment Center, Laredo, Texas, U.S.	
20	Win	20–0	Rubén Galván	TKO	4 (8), 2:22	25 Jun 2005	Boardwalk Hall, Atlantic City, New Jersey, U.S.	
19	Win	19–0	Adam Wynant	KO	1 (6), 0:42	28 May 2005	Staples Center, Los Angeles, California, U.S.	
18	Win	18–0	Travis Hartman	TKO	3 (8), 0:51	22 Apr 2005	Dodge Arena, Hidalgo, Texas, U.S.	
17	Win	17–0	Ryan Maraldo	TKO	3 (6), 2:56	19 Mar 2005	MGM Grand Garden Arena, Paradise, Nevada, U.S.	
16	Win	16–0	Leroy Newton	TKO	1 (6), 2:11	11 Feb 2005	Convention Center, San Diego, California, U.S.	
15	Win	15–0	Jose Cruz	TKO	2 (8)	21 Jan 2005	Parque Revolución, Culiacán, Mexico	
14	Win	14–0	Eliseo Urias	KO	2 (6)	18 Dec 2004	Autonomous University of Sinaloa, Culiacán, Mexico	
13	Win	13–0	Sheldon Mosley	TKO	5 (6)	26 Nov 2004	Poliforo Juan Gabriel, Ciudad Juárez, Mexico	
12	Win	12–0	Mike Walker	TKO	1 (6), 2:21	23 Oct 2004	Desert Diamond Casino, Tucson, Arizona, U.S.	
11	Win	11–0	Miguel Galindo	TKO	4 (6)	4 Sep 2004	Bullring by the Sea, Tijuana, Mexico	
10	Win	10–0	Jason Smith	UD	4	31 Jul 2004	MGM Grand Garden Arena, Paradise, Nevada, U.S.	
9	Win	9–0	Jose Luis Huerta	TKO	2 (6), 0:52	26 Jun 2004	Parque Revolución, Culiacán, Mexico	
8	Win	8–0	Antonio Aguilar	KO	1 (4), 1:10	22 May 2004	Plaza de Toros, Mexico City, Mexico	
7	Win	7–0	Arturo Ocampo	KO	2 (6)	24 Apr 2004	Palenque de Gallos Tuxtla Gutiérrez, Mexico	
6	Win	6–0	Guadalupe Arce	KO	1 (4), 2:10	27 Mar 2004	Auditorio Municipal, Tijuana, Mexico	
5	Win	5–0	Oisin Fagan	UD	4	28 Feb 2004	MGM Grand Garden Arena, Paradise, Nevada, U.S.	
4	Win	4–0	Jose Burgos	UD	4	29 Jan 2004	International Ballroom, Houston, Texas, U.S.	
3	Win	3–0	Gerardo Penaflor	UD	4	5 Dec 2003	International Ballroom, Houston, Texas, U.S.	
2	Win	2–0	Eugene Johnson	KO	1 (4)	22 Nov 2003	Centro de Espectáculos Alamar, Tijuana, Mexico	
1	Win	1–0	Jonathan Hernandez	UD	4	26 Sep 2003	Parque Revolución, Culiacán, Mexico	

== Titles in boxing ==
=== Major world titles ===
- WBC middleweight champion (160 lbs)

=== Silver/Youth titles ===
- WBC Youth light middleweight title (154 lbs)
- WBC Silver middleweight title (160 lbs)

=== Regional/International titles ===
- WBC Continental Americas light middleweight title (154 lbs)
- WBC Latino light middleweight title (154 lbs)
- WBC Continental Americas super middleweight title (168 lbs)

== Pay per view bouts ==
No.	Date	Fight	Billing	Buys	Revenue	Network
1	15 September 2012	Chávez Jr. vs. Martínez	Chávez Jr. vs Martínez	475,000	$25m	HBO
2	6 May 2017	Canelo vs. Chávez Jr.	Civil War	1,000,000	$80m	HBO
3	29 June 2025	Paul vs. Chávez Jr.	Paul vs. Chávez Jr.	Undisclosed	Undisclosed	DAZN

== Trainers ==
Chávez has been trained by two of his uncles, who have been criticized for not putting their foot down with the young fighter in terms of discipline. Chávez needed more motivation and guidance so he switched from his uncles to famous Freddie Roach to his corner.

On 3 February, Chávez Jr. revealed that he had hired hall of fame trainer Ignacio "Nacho Beristain" for the Álvarez fight. Beristain later confirmed the announcement. He also revealed he had hired Angel "Memo" Heredia as his strength and conditioning coach. Nacho and Heredia previously worked together whilst training Juan Manuel Marquez. In early April, Nacho threatened to split with Chávez Jr. during a verbal clash. Nacho revealed that Chávez Jr. wanted to finish up training camp and travel to Mexico City or Las Vegas to finish up before the fight. Nacho wanted Chávez Jr. to remain in Temoaya, Mexico, which is 3,200 meters above sea level, until the end of April. Nacho said that he wanted to remain his trainer after 6 May.

== See also ==
- List of Mexican boxing world champions
- Notable boxing families
- List of WBC world champions
- List of middleweight boxing champions

Sporting positions
Regional boxing titles
Vacant Title last held by Ante Bilic	WBC Youth super welterweight champion 19 August 2006 – September 2006; Vacated	Vacant Title next held by Zapir Rasulov
Vacant Title last held by Ulises David Lopez	WBC Continental Americas super welterweight champion 9 February 2008 – July 2008; Vacated	Vacant Title next held by Jesús González
Vacant Title last held by Carlos Nascimento	WBC Latino super welterweight champion 28 March 2009 – October 2009; Vacated	Vacant Title next held by Marcos Hector Vergara
New title	WBC Silver middleweight champion 26 June 2010 – 4 June 2011; Won world title	Vacant Title next held by Avtandil Khurtsidze
Vacant Title last held by Librado Andrade	WBC Continental Americas super middleweight champion 1 March 2014 – April 2015; Vacated	Vacant Title next held by Mike Jimenez
World boxing titles
Preceded by Sebastian Zbik	WBC middleweight champion 4 June 2011 – 15 September 2012	Succeeded by Sergio Martínez
