= Canelo Álvarez vs. Julio César Chávez Jr. =

2017 professional boxing match

Mexican Showdown
- Date: May 6, 2017
- Venue: T-Mobile Arena; Paradise, Nevada, United States

Tale of the tape
Boxer	(Mexico) Saúl Álvarez	(Mexico) Julio César Chávez Jr.
Nickname	"Canelo" ("Cinnamon")	"La Leyenda Continúa" ("The Legend Continues")
Hometown	Guadalajara, Jalisco, Mexico	Culiacán, Sinaloa, Mexico
Purse	$5,000,000	$3,000,000
Pre-fight record	48–1–1 (34 KO)	50–2–1 (32 KO)
Age	26 years, 9 months	31 years, 2 months
Height	5 ft 8 in (173 cm)	6 ft 1 in (185 cm)
Weight	164 lb (74 kg)	164 lb (74 kg)
Style	Orthodox	Orthodox
Recognition	The Ring and TBRB; Middleweight Champion; WBO; Light Middleweight Champion; The Ring No. 8 ranked pound-for-pound fighter 2-division world champion	WBC; No. 7 Ranked Super Middleweight; Former middleweight champion

Result
- Álvarez wins via 12-round unanimous decision (120-108, 120-108, 120-108)

Canelo Álvarez vs. Julio César Chávez Jr., billed as Mexican Showdown, was a professional boxing fight held on May 6, 2017 at the T-Mobile Arena in Paradise, Nevada, part of the Las Vegas metropolitan area. Álvarez was declared the winner by unanimous decision, having been judged the winner of all 12 rounds by each of the three ringside judges.

== Background ==
Following Julio César Chávez Jr.'s comeback win against Dominik Britsch in December 2016, he claimed he was back and ready to fight Golovkin at 168 pounds and Álvarez at a 164 catchweight. Negotiations began soon after for a potential HBO PPV fight to take place between Julio César Chávez Jr. and Canelo Álvarez in 2017 on the Cinco de Mayo weekend, as there was interest from both sides that a fight take place. Golden Boy president Eric Gomez confirmed a catchweight of 165 lbs was agreed between both sides. WBC president Mauricio Sulaiman was on board and said it was a "very attractive fight." and would likely get his organization involved in the fight.

Julio César Chávez Sr. spoke on December 18 about the ongoing negotiations saying Golden Boy were offering his son a small amount for the potential big ppv fight. He went on to claim his son was offered a $5m purse with no mention he would get a cut of the ppv revenue, a counter offer was submitted. A rematch clause was also discussed, which Chavez Jr. and his team had no problem with. Chávez Sr. went on to admit that he was fully aware Álvarez is the A-side in the fight, and would settle for no less than 30-35% of the full revenue. On December 24, Álvarez and his team gave Chavez a week to accept the terms, which included a purse of $7m, or he would consider other options. On January 12, 2017 De La Hoya and Álvarez called for the contract to be signed, which was supposedly sent to Al Haymon, who advises Chavez Jr. and urged him to sign it. A day later, Chavez Jr. claimed he had agreed all the demands set by Álvarez and was said that he would sign the contract. According to Chavez Jr. the new demands included a weight limit set at 164.5 pounds and a $6 million base purse plus PPV revenue percentages. On January 13, Álvarez officially confirmed the fight to take place on May 6, 2017. A rematch clause was also put in place if Chavez Jr. wins the fight and another clause for every pound Chavez Jr. weighs over the limit, he would be fined $1 million.

== The fight ==
In front of a sold-out crowd of 20,510, Álvarez won the fight by a shutout unanimous decision in dominating fashion. All three judges scored it 120-108 for Álvarez. Chávez was very cautious throughout the fight. At times, he came forward and also had Álvarez against the ropes, but failed to throw any punches. This led to jeers from the crowd in the later rounds due to lack of action.

== Aftermath ==
Álvarez spoke to HBO's Max Kellerman in the post fight interview, speaking of his fighting style, "Tonight, I showed I could move, I could box, I showed as a fighter I can do all things. I thought I was going to showcase myself as a fighter that could throw punches, but he just wouldn't do it. I've shown I can do lots of things in the ring, anything a fighter brings, I've shown I can showcase myself." CompuBox Stats showed that Álvarez landed 228 of 604 his punches thrown (38%) and Chávez landed 71 of 302 (24%). By the end of round 5, Álvarez landed 102 punches compared to Chávez's 25 landed.

Early figures revealed that the fight generated at least 1 million buys. A replay was shown on regular HBO a week later and drew an average of 769,000 viewers. This was the first boxing match to generate over 1 million PPV buys that didn't include Mayweather, Pacquiao or De La Hoya since 2002, which saw Lennox Lewis retain his heavyweight world titles against Mike Tyson. Later sources confirmed the fight did close to 1.2 million buys, which means it would have generated around $80 million.

== Undercard ==
Confirmed bouts:

Weight Class	Weight		vs.		Method	Round	Time	Notes
Catchweight	164.5 lbs.	(Mexico) Canelo Álvarez	def.	(Mexico) Julio César Chávez Jr.	UD	12
Super middleweight	175 lbs.	(Canada) David Lemieux	def.	(Mexico) Marcos Reyes	UD	10
Welterweight	147 lbs.	(Argentina) Lucas Matthysse	def.	(United States) Emanuel Taylor	TKO	5/10	2:21	^{Note 1}
Featherweight	126 lbs.	(United States) Joseph Diaz	def.	(United States) Manuel Ávila	UD	10		^{Note 2}
Preliminary Card
Lightweight	135 lbs.	(United States) Ryan Garcia	def.	(United States) Tyrone Luckey	TKO	2/6	2:20
Flyweight	112 lbs.	(United States) Marlen Esparza	def.	(United States) Samantha Salazar	UD	4
Light middleweight	150 lbs.	(Mexico) Raul Curiel	def.	(United States) Jesus Sanchez Quiroz	MD	4
Non TV bouts
Super bantamweight	122 lbs.	(United States) Ronny Rios	def.	(Mexico) Daniel Noriega	TKO	4/10	2:22
Lightweight	135 lbs.	(Mexico) Joseph Aguirre	def.	(Mexico) Miguel Angel Perez Aispuro	UD	6

^Note 1 For vacant WBO International Welterweight title
^Note 2 For NABF and vacant NABO Featherweight title

== Broadcasting ==
=== TV ===
Country	Broadcaster
Australia	Main Event
Brazil	SporTV
Latin America	Space
Ireland	BoxNation & BT Sport
Mexico	TV Azteca & Televisa
Panama	RPC
Philippines	Sky Cable
Poland	Polsat
United Kingdom	BoxNation & BT Sport
United States	HBO

=== Cinemas ===
Fathom Events broadcast the fight live in movie theaters across the US.

Preceded by vs. Liam Smith	Canelo Álvarez's bouts 6 May 2017	Succeeded by vs. Gennady Golovkin
Preceded by vs. Dominik Britsch	Julio César Chávez Jr.'s bouts 6 May 2017	Succeeded by vs. Evert Bravo
