= Alejandro Barrera =

Mexican boxer (born 1986)

Personal information
- Nickname: El Elegido
- Nationality: (Mexico) Mexican
- Born: Alejandro Barrera; September 5, 1986 (age 40) Monterrey, Nuevo León, Mexico
- Height: 6 ft 1 in (185 cm)
- Weight: Light Middleweight

Boxing career
- Reach: 75 in (191 cm)
- Stance: Orthodox

Boxing record
- Total fights: 33
- Wins: 27
- Win by KO: 17
- Losses: 6
- Draws: 0
- No contests: 0

Alejandro Barrera (born September 5, 1986) is a Mexican professional boxer. He previously held the WBC FECOMBOX light middleweight title.

== Professional career ==
On June 19, 2010, Barrera beat Christian Solano by TKO in the ninth round and won the WBC FECOMBOX light middleweight title.

== Professional boxing record ==
34 fights	29 wins	5 losses
By knockout	18	1
By decision	11	4

No.	Result	Record	Opponent	Type	Round, time	Date	Location	Notes
34	Loss	29–5	(Dominican Republic) Carlos Adames	UD	10	12 May 2018	(United States) Madison Square Garden, New York City, New York, USA	
33	Loss	29–4	(United States) Keandre Gibson	MD	10	2017-10-19	(United States) Monte Carlo Resort and Casino, Las Vegas, Nevada, USA	
32	Win	29–3	(United States) Eddie Gomez	SD	10	2017-07-29	(United States) Casino del Sol, Tucson, Arizona, USA	
31	Loss	28–3	(United States) Errol Spence Jr.	TKO	5 (12), 1:46	2015-11-28	(United States) The Bomb Factory, Dallas, Texas, USA	
30	Win	28–2	(Mexico) Jose de Jesus Macias	SD	10	2015-10-10	Mexico City Arena, Mexico City, Mexico	
29	Win	27–2	(Mexico) Juan Macias Montiel	SD	9	2015-03-21	Palenque de la Feria Mesoamericana, Tapachula, Mexico	
28	Win	26–2	(Mexico) Abner Lopez	UD	10	2014-08-09	Arena Monterrey, Monterrey, Mexico	
27	Loss	25–2	(Mexico) Ramses Agaton	SD	10	2014-05-03	Palenque de la Feria Ganadera, Culiacán, Mexico	
26	Win	25–1	(Mexico) Gabriel Martínez	PTS	10	2013-11-16	El Domo, San Luis Potosí City, Mexico	
25	Win	24–1	(Mexico) Juan Carlos Raygosa	MD	6	2013-10-25	Deportivo del Sindicato del Metro, Mexico City, Mexico	
24	Win	23–1	(Mexico) Juan Carlos Raygosa	MD	6	2013-09-13	Mexico City, Mexico	
23	Win	22–1	(Mexico) Luis Cruz	TKO	6 (8)	2013-04-20	Mexico City Arena, Mexico City, Mexico	
22	Win	21–1	(United States) John Mackey	UD	8	2012-12-13	(United States) Atlanta Peach Ballroom, Atlanta, Georgia, USA	
21	Loss	20–1	(Mexico) Armando Robles	UD	6	2012-05-19	Arena TKT Box Tour, Puerto Vallarta, Mexico	
20	Win	20–0	(Mexico) Gabino Arias	TKO	4 (6), 1:55	2012-02-25	Centro de Convenciones Siglo XXI, Mérida, Mexico	
19	Win	19–0	(Mexico) Diego Armando Rivera Martinez	KO	1 (6), 2:30	2011-10-21	Arena Jalisco, Guadalajara, Mexico	
18	Win	18–0	(Mexico) Francisco Javier Reza	UD	10	2011-07-02	Gimnasio Nuevo León, Monterrey, Mexico	
17	Win	17–0	(Mexico) Alfredo Hernandez	KO	9 (10), 2:17	2011-06-03	Deportivo Tlalli, Tlalnepantla de Baz, Mexico	
16	Win	16–0	(Mexico) Candelario Herrera	KO	6 (10)	2010-10-09	Estadio de Béisbol, Monterrey, Mexico	
15	Win	15–0	(Mexico) Christian Solano	TKO	9 (12)	2010-06-19	Cortijo San Felipe, San Pedro Garza García, Mexico	Won vacant WBC FECOMBOX Super welterweight title.
14	Win	14–0	(Mexico) Nicolas Lucio Arteaga	KO	9 (10)	2010-03-02	Arena El Jefe, Monterrey, Mexico	
13	Win	13–0	(Mexico) Victor Marquez	KO	1 (10), 2:50	2010-02-03	Arena El Jefe, Monterrey, Mexico	
12	Win	12–0	(Mexico) Victor Marquez	KO	8 (10)	2009-11-18	Arena El Jefe, Monterrey, Mexico	
11	Win	11–0	(Mexico) Antonio Villanueva	TKO	2 (8)	2009-07-02	Arena La Rumba, Monterrey, Mexico	
10	Win	10–0	(Mexico) Antonio Villanueva	TKO	2 (6), 1:20	2009-07-01	Arena La Rumba, Monterrey, Mexico	
9	Win	9–0	(Mexico) Manuel Marino	KO	2 (8), 1:20	2009-04-01	Arena El Jefe, Monterrey, Mexico	
8	Win	8–0	(Mexico) Antonio Villanueva	TKO	3 (8), 2:59	2009-03-18	Arena El Jefe, Monterrey, Mexico	
7	Win	7–0	(Mexico) Gonzalo Juzaino	KO	1 (6), 2:42	2009-02-14	Expo Forum, Hermosillo, Mexico	
6	Win	6–0	(Mexico) Jose Luis Lopez	KO	1 (6), 2:00	2008-12-09	Arena El Jefe, Monterrey, Mexico	
5	Win	5–0	(Mexico) Sergio Mendez	UD	6	2008-10-10	Arena Coliseo, Monterrey, Mexico	
4	Win	4–0	(Mexico) Julio Basurto	PTS	4	2008-06-26	Plaza Woodstock, Monterrey, Mexico	
3	Win	3–0	(Mexico) Edgar Marroquin	TKO	1 (4), 1:43	2008-04-18	Pueblo Viejo, Veracruz, Mexico	
2	Win	2–0	(Mexico) Juan Jose Lobatos	TKO	3 (4), 2:30	2008-02-01	Auditorio Coca Cola, Monterrey, Mexico	
1	Win	1–0	(Mexico) Ernesto Gonzalez	RTD	2 (4), 0:10	2007-09-14	Arena El Jefe, Monterrey, Mexico	
