= Nicole Chávez =

Mexican television actress, model and reality television star

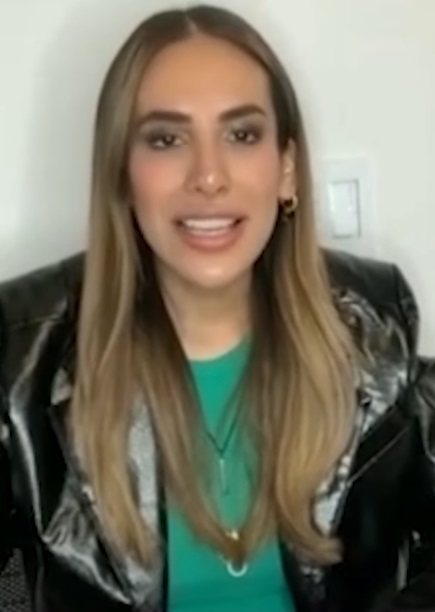
- Born: November 4, 1998 (age 27)
- Occupations: Television actress, reality television star, model, dancer
- Notable credit(s): "Pequeños Gigantes", "Qué Le Pasa a Mi Familia?", "La Casa de los Famosos 3"
- Father: Julio César Chávez
- Relatives: Julio César Chávez Jr. (brother); Omar Chávez (brother)

Myriam Nicole Chávez Escobar (born November 4, 1998) is a Mexican actress, reality television star, model and influencer. She is the daughter of Mexican boxer Julio César Chávez.

As a fashion model, she has been featured on magazines such as People en Espanol.

== Biography ==
Nicole Chávez did not show interest in the sport of boxing, like many other members of her family did. Instead, she wanted to become a dancer and an actress. Chávez began dancing at age ten, and was later accepted into Televisa's Centro de Educación Artística as an acting student. When Chávez was twelve, she made her television debut in a show named Pequeños Gigantes, as a dancer in a team named "Los Pequeños Guerreros" ("The Little Warriors"). In February 2021, she was cast for a role in a Juan Osorio-directed Televisa telenovela, named ¿Qué le pasa a mi familia? ("What's Happening to My Family"), where she played a character named Camila Castillo Jaurillo.

A short time later, Chávez was chosen by Adidas to model their Mexico Men's National Football Team's jersey prior to the 2022 FIFA Men's World Cup, which was played in Qatar.

In 2023, Chávez was a participant in the televised reality show, La casa de los famosos 3. She did not win the show, and according to a television gossip show named Hoy Día on Telemundo, she blamed Salvador Zerboni for her not winning. That same year Chávez participated in Los 50.

== Personal ==
Chávez, the daughter of professional boxer and International Boxing Hall of Fame member Julio César Chávez Sr. and of Myriam Escobar, grew up in the United States; she also lived in Tijuana as a young girl.

From her father's side, she has three brothers, Julio César Jr., Omar and Cristian (not to be confused with the Mexican singer, Christian Chávez). From her mother's side, she has a sister named Tania Gallardo and a brother, also named Cristian, Cristian Gallardo.

== See also ==
- List of Mexicans
