= Armando Robles =

Mexican boxer (born 1978)

Personal information
- Nickname: Chato
- Born: 9 January 1978 (age 48) Guadalajara, Jalisco, Mexico
- Height: 5 ft 10 in (180 cm)
- Weight: Welterweight; Light welterweight

Boxing career
- Reach: 72 in (183 cm)
- Stance: Orthodox

Boxing record
- Total fights: 41
- Wins: 31
- Win by KO: 18
- Losses: 7
- Draws: 2
- No contests: 1

Armando "Chato" Robles (born 9 January 1978) is a Mexican professional boxer. He twice held the WBC FECARBOX light welterweight title.

== Professional career ==
=== Mexican Light Welterweight title ===
In March 2010, he beat an undefeated Javier Arostegui by knockout to win the Mexican National light welterweight title.

On November 27, 2010, Robles beat Daniel Sandoval in Tijuana, Baja California.

== Professional boxing record ==
41 fights	31 wins	7 losses
By knockout	18	1
By decision	13	6
Draws	2	
No contests	1	

No.	Result	Record	Opponent	Type	Round, Time	Date	Location	Notes
41	Loss	31–7–2 (1)	Ayaz Hussain	UD	8	Jun 17, 2017	Olympia Theatre, Montreal, Canada	
40	Loss	31–6–2 (1)	Samuel Vargas	UD	10	Mar 18, 2017	Powerade Centre, Brampton, Canada	For NABF welterweight title
39	Loss	31–5–2 (1)	Anthony Yigit	UD	10	Sep 10, 2016	Hovet, Stockholm, Sweden	
38	Win	31–4–2 (1)	Daniel Armando Valenzuela	TKO	5 (10), 0:51	Aug 26, 2016	Parque Vicente Guerrero, Mexicali, Mexico	
37	Win	30–4–2 (1)	Carlos Parra	TKO	6 (8), 0:10	Nov 13, 2015	Golden Lion Casino, Mexicali, Mexico	
36	NC	29–4–2 (1)	Carlos Parra	NC	1 (10)	Jul 11, 2015	Carnitas Tepatitlan, Tijuana, Mexico	Robles suffer cut over right eye from accidental head butt
35	Loss	29–4–2	Jose Zepeda	KO	1 (10), 0:44	Apr 25, 2015	Auditorio Municipal, Tijuana, Mexico	
34	Win	29–3–2	Omar Estrella	UD	12	Nov 14, 2014	Golden Lion Casino, Mexicali, Mexico	Won vacant IBF Latino lightweight title
33	Win	28–3–2	Antonio Torres Nava	UD	12	Sep 26, 2014	Hipódromo Caliente, Arena Tecate, Tijuana, Mexico	
32	Win	27–3–2	Jose Alejandro Alonso Rivera	TKO	3 (6), 2:51	Aug 14, 2014	Rancho Grande Bar, Tijuana, Mexico	Alonso slips in corner and hurts leg, can't continue
31	Win	26–3–2	Eduardo Iniguez	TKO	4 (6), 2:12	Jul 3, 2014	Rancho Grande Bar, Tijuana, Mexico	
30	Win	25–3–2	Alvaro Aguilar	UD	10	Nov 15, 2013	Auditorio Municipal, Tijuana, Mexico	
29	Loss	24–3–2	Jesus Gurrola	UD	10	Sep 14, 2013	Golden Lion Casino, Mexicali, Mexico	
28	Loss	24–2–2	Silverio Ortiz	UD	12	Apr 27, 2013	Centro de Conveciones Siglo XXI, Mérida, Mexico	
27	Win	24–1–2	José David Mosquera	TKO	9 (10), 2:30	Dec 14, 2012	Centro de Espactáculos Promocasa, Mexicali, Mexico	Won vacant WBC FECARBOX light-welterweight title
26	Win	23–1–2	Humberto Gutierrez Ochoa	MD	10	Oct 20, 2012	Plaza de Toros Calafia, Mexicali, Mexico	
25	Draw	22–1–2	Rodolfo Quintanilla	MD	8	Aug 11, 2012	Complejo Panamericano, Guadalajara, Mexico	
24	Win	22–1–1	Alejandro Barrera	UD	6	May 19, 2012	Arena TKT Box Tour, Puerto Vallarta, Mexico	
23	Win	21–1–1	Abraham Alvarez	TKO	3 (4), 2:43	Feb 18, 2012	Centro de Espectáculos Promocasa, Mexicali, Mexico	
22	Win	20–1–1	Ivan Alvarez	UD	12	Dec 10, 2011	Plaza de Toros Calafia, Mexicali, Mexico	Won vacant WBC FECARBOX light-welterweight title
21	Win	19–1–1	Manuel Leyva	TKO	5 (10), 2:36	Aug 20, 2011	El Nido Sports Enter, Mexicali, Mexico	
20	Win	18–1–1	Francisco Dianzo	TKO	3 (?), 1:50	Jul 2, 2011	Centro de Espactáculos Promocasa, Mexicali, Mexico	
19	Win	17–1–1	Pablo Munguia	TKO	8 (12), 2:11	May 28, 2011	Centro de Espectáculos Promocasa, Mexicali, Mexico	Retained Mexican light-welterweight title
18	Win	16–1–1	Javier Hernandez	UD	12	Feb 25, 2011	Centro de Espactáculos Promocasa, Mexicali, Mexico	Retained Mexican light-welterweight title
17	Win	15–1–1	Daniel Sandoval	UD	6	Nov 27, 2010	Auditorio Municipal, Tijuana, Mexico	
16	Win	14–1–1	Alexis Salinas	TKO	4 (10), 2:16	Nov 12, 2010	Gimnasio de Mexical, Mexicali, Mexico	
15	Win	13–1–1	Alejandro Mendez	TKO	3 (10)	Jul 17, 2010	Palenque de la Feria, Tuxtla Gutiérrez, Mexico	
14	Win	12–1–1	Juan Ruiz	UD	6	May 15, 2010	Estadio Centenario, Los Mochis, Mexico	
13	Win	11–1–1	Javier Arostegui	TKO	4 (12)	Mar 20, 2010	Auditorio del Estado, Mexicali, Mexico	Won vacant Mexican light-welterweight title
12	Win	10–1–1	Gerardo Marquez	KO	1 (4)	Feb 12, 2010	Gimnasio de Mexicali, Mexicali, Mexico	
11	Win	9–1–1	Jorge Silva	TKO	4 (6)	Sep 12, 2009	Ensenada, Baja California, Mexico	
10	Win	8–1–1	Juan Angulo Gonzalez	TKO	2 (4), 2:25	Aug 29, 2009	Ciudad Deportiva, Mexicali, Mexico	
9	Win	7–1–1	Livingstone Bramble	UD	6	Jun 27, 2003	Centro Civico Mexicano, Salt Lake City, Utah, U.S.	
8	Win	6–1–1	Miguel Angel Ruiz	UD	6	Jun 6, 2003	Dixie Junior College, Saint George, Utah, U.S.	
7	Win	5–1–1	Donnie Fosmire	TKO	1 (4)	Nov 8, 2002	Promontory Hall, Salt Lake City, Utah, U.S.	
6	Win	4–1–1	Jesus Abel Santiago	UD	4	Jul 19, 2002	Yakama Legends Casino, Toppenish, Washington, U.S.	
5	Draw	3–1–1	Martin Ramirez	TD	4 (4), 0:58	Jun 21, 2002	Orleans Hotel & Casino, Paradise, Nevada, U.S.	
4	Loss	3–1	Patrick Dominguez	MD	4	Apr 14, 2002	Hard Rock Hotel and Casino, Paradise, Nevada, U.S.	
3	Win	3–0	Israel Sandoval	TKO	1 (?)	Oct 20, 2001	West Wendover, Utah, U.S.	
2	Win	2–0	Nelson Valles	UD	4	Sep 23, 2001	Stateline Casino, West Wendover, Utah, U.S.	
1	Win	1–0	Miguel Valdez	SD	4	Aug 19, 2001	Stateline Casino, West Wendover, Utah, U.S.	
