= Marco Antonio Nazareth =

Mexican boxer (1986–2009)

Personal information
- Nickname: Texano
- Born: Marco Antonio Nazareth; 12 April 1986 Puerto Vallarta, Jalisco, Mexico
- Died: 22 July 2009 (aged 23)
- Height: 1.80 m (5 ft 11 in)
- Weight: Light welterweight

Boxing career
- Reach: 184 cm (72 in)
- Stance: Orthodox

Boxing record
- Total fights: 8
- Wins: 4
- Win by KO: 3
- Losses: 4
- Draws: 0
- No contests: 0

Marco Antonio Nazareth (12 April 1986 – 22 July 2009) was a Mexican professional boxer.

== Professional career ==
Nazareth began his professional career in 2005, and until 2009 he racked up a record of four wins and three losses in seven bouts. In Guadalajara, Jalisco Marco received his first loss to a future IBF Lightweight Champion, Mexican Miguel Vazquez.

=== Death ===
On 18 July 2009, he fought for the second time with Omar Chávez, son of Julio César Chávez in Puerto Vallarta, Jalisco. He lost the bout via a 4th-round TKO, then he collapsed in the ring and had to be taken to the local hospital where he underwent a three-hour surgery to treat a cerebral hemorrhage. He died four days later.
