= Jake Paul vs. Julio Cesar Chavez Jr. =

2025 professional boxing match

Paul vs Chávez Jr.
- Date: June 28, 2025
- Venue: Honda Center, Anaheim, California, U.S.

Tale of the tape
Boxer	Jake Paul	Julio César Chávez Jr.
Nickname	The Problem Child El Gallo ("The Rooster")	La Leyenda Continua ("The Legend Continues")
Hometown	Cleveland, Ohio, U.S.	Culiacan, Sinaloa, Mex.
Pre-fight record	11–1 (7 KOs)	54–6–1 (1) (34 KOs)
Age	28 years, 5 months	39 years, 4 months
Height	6 ft 1 in (1.85 m)	6 ft 0 in (1.83 m)
Weight	199.4 lb (90.4 kg)	198.4 lb (90.0 kg)
Style	Orthodox	Orthodox
Recognition		Former WBC middleweight champion

Result
- Paul wins via 10-round unanimous decision (97–93, 98–92, 99–91)

Jake Paul vs. Julio César Chávez Jr. was a cruiserweight professional boxing match between YouTuber-turned-boxer Jake Paul and former WBC middleweight world champion Julio César Chávez Jr. The bout took place on June 28, 2025, at the Honda Center in Anaheim, California. Paul defeated Chávez Jr. via unanimous decision.

== Background ==
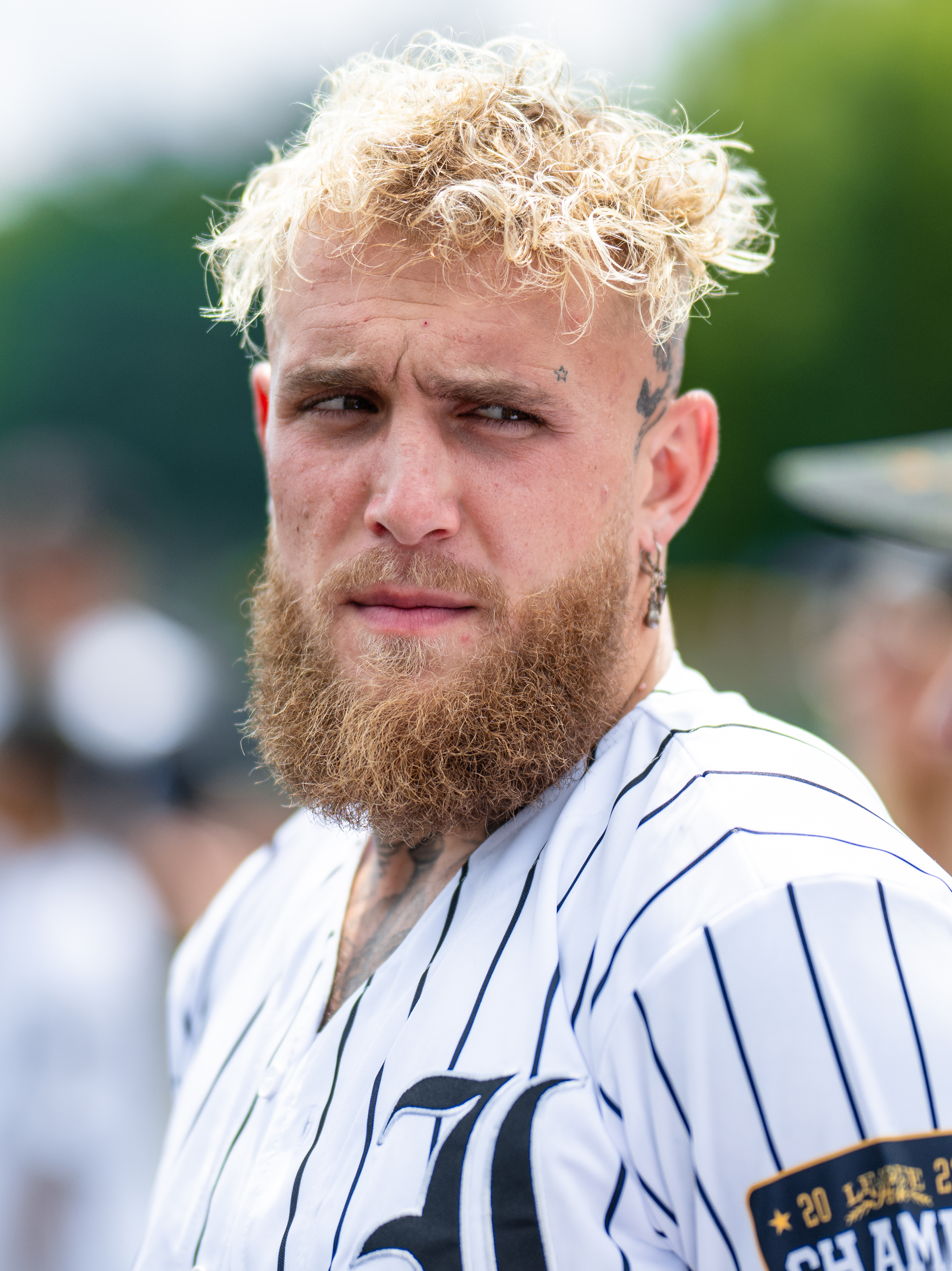
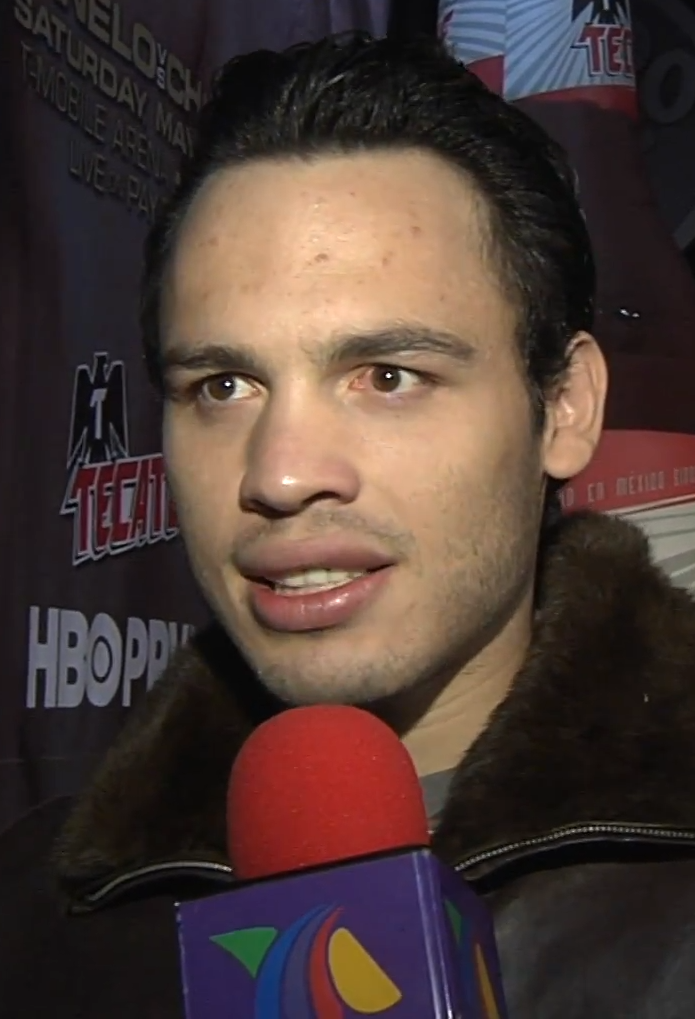
Jake Paul (left) and Julio César Chávez Jr. (right)

On April 18, 2025, Most Valuable Promotions (MVP) announced that Jake Paul would face former WBC middleweight world champion Julio César Chávez Jr in a 10-round professional cruiserweight bout scheduled for June 28, 2025, at the Honda Center in Anaheim, California, with the fight broadcast on DAZN pay-per-view, a matchup that drew attention due to Paul facing a former world champion and Chávez Jr. competing at cruiserweight in the latter stage of his career, where Paul defeated Chávez Jr by unanimous decision after ten rounds. The fight set the record for the highest boxing gate ever at the Honda Center.

== Fight card ==
Weight Class		vs.		Method	Round	Min	Notes
Main Card (MVP)
Cruiserweight	Jake Paul	def.	Julio César Chávez Jr.	UD	10	3:00
Cruiserweight	Gilberto Ramirez (c)	def.	Yuniel Dorticos	UD	12	3:00	^{Note 1}
Lightweight	Floyd Schofield	def.	Tevin Farmer	KO	1/10	1:18
Welterweight	Julian Rodriguez	def.	Avious Griffin	KO	10/10	2:55	^{Note 2}
Welterweight	Raúl Curiel	def.	Victor Ezequiel Rodriguez	KO	4/10	2:09	^{Note 3}
Preliminary Card (MVP YouTube channel)
Super featherweight	René Alvarado	def.	Victor Morales Jr.	UD	10	2:00
Lightweight	Holly Holm	def.	Yolanda Vega	UD	10	2:00
Super Bantamweight	John Ramirez	def.	Josue Morales	UD	8	3:00
Featherweight	Alexander Gueche	def.	Vincent Avina	UD	8	3:00
Welterweight	Joel Iriate	def.	Kevin Johnson	UD	8	3:00
Heavyweight	Joshua Edwards	def.	Dominicc Hardy	KO	1/6	1:03

^Note 1 For WBA, WBO cruiserweight titles.
^Note 2 For the WBC USA welterweight title.
^Note 3 For NABF welterweight title.

=== The scorecard ===
Rudy Barragan		Max DeLuca		Steve Weisfeld	
Paul	Chávez Jr	Paul	Chávez Jr	Paul	Chávez Jr
97	93	98	92	99	91

Preceded by vs. Mike Tyson	Jake Paul's bouts	Succeeded by vs. Anthony Joshua
Preceded by vs. Uriah Hall	Julio César Chávez Jr's bouts	Succeeded by vs. Angel Julian
