= Marcos Reyes =

Mexican boxer

Marco Reyes
Personal information
- Nickname: Dorado / Elaniquilador reyes
- Born: Marco Antonio Reyes Nevarez; 24 November 1987 (age 38) Chihuahua, Chihuahua, Mexico
- Height: 1.89 m (6 ft 2 in)
- Weight: Middleweight; Light middleweight

Boxing career
- Reach: 195 cm (77 in)
- Stance: Orthodox

Boxing record
- Total fights: 46
- Wins: 37
- Win by KO: 28
- Losses: 9

Marco Antonio Reyes Nevarez (born 24 November 1987) is a Mexican professional boxer. Reyes is trained by former world champion Roberto García.

== Professional career ==
On June 12, 2010, Reyes beat veteran Jose Luis Zertuche by eleventh round K.O.

On August 21, 2010, Reyes defeated Miguel Angel Tena by third round K.O. On September 15, 2010, Reyes defeated Victor Villereal by second round T.K.O. Then Reyes defeated Martin Avila by second-round T.K.O. On January 1, 2011, Reyes defeated Rito Ruvalcaba by first-round T.K.O.

On June 4, 2011, he achieved victory over the experienced Christian "Olimpico" Solano by knockout in the fourth round.

== Professional boxing record ==
41 fights	36 wins	5 losses
By knockout	27	1
By decision	9	4

Result	Opponent	Type	Rd.	Date	Location	Notes
Win	(Argentina) Miguel Angel Suarez	TKO	2 (10)	2018-03-10	(Mexico) Gimnasio Rodrigo M. Quevedo, Chihuahua	
Loss	(Canada) David Lemieux	UD	10	6 May 2017	(United States) T-Mobile Arena, Las Vegas	
Win	(Mexico) Diego Armando Rivera Martinez	TKO	2 (10)	2017-03-17	(Mexico) Gimnasio Rodrigo M. Quevedo, Chihuahua	
Loss	(United States) Elvin Ayala	TKO	7 (10)	2016-11-03	(United States) Dallas Petroleum Club, Dallas	For vacant WBC United States (USNBC) middleweight title
Win	(Mexico) Cesar Soriano Berumen	TKO	3 (6)	2016-08-26	(United States) Humble Civic Center, Humble	
Loss	(Mexico) Julio César Chávez Jr.	UD	10	2015-07-18	(United States) Don Haskins Convention Center, El Paso	
Win	(Mexico) David Lopez	UD	8	2015-01-24	(Mexico) Centro de Convenciones Azul, Ixtapa Zihuatanejo	
Loss	(United States) Abraham Han	MD	10	2014-10-18	(United States) StubHub Center, Carson	
Win	(Mexico) Octavio Castro	UD	10	2014-06-07	(Mexico) Estadio de Beisbol, Ciudad Cuauhtemoc	
Win	(Brazil) Idiozan Matos	TKO	2 (10)	2014-04-05	(Mexico) Gran Estadio, Ciudad Delicias	
Win	(Mexico) Isaac Mendez	TKO	3 (10)	2013-12-21	(Mexico) Gimnasio Rodrigo M. Quevedo, Chihuahua	
Win	(Mexico) Rogelio Medina	MD	12	2013-10-05	(Mexico) Gimnasio Manuel Bernardo Aguirre, Chihuahua	
Win	(Argentina) Amilcar Edgardo Funes Melian	UD	10	2013-07-27	(Mexico) Palenque de la Fería, Chihuahua	
Win	(United States) Eric Mitchell	TKO	5 (10)	2013-04-13	(Mexico) Monumental Plaza de Toros, Ciudad Hidalgo	
Win	(Mexico) Julio César García	MD	8	2012-12-22	(Mexico) Auditorio del Bicentenario, Morelia	
Win	(Mexico) Julio César García	UD	10	2012-09-08	(Mexico) Gimnasio Miguel Alemán Valdez, Celaya	
Win	(Mexico) Octavio Castro	UD	10	2012-06-09	(Mexico) Gimnasio Manuel Bernardo Aguirre, Chihuahua	
Win	(Mexico) Isaac Mendez	KO	3(12)	2012-01-28	(Mexico) Gimnasio Manuel Bernardo Aguirre, Chihuahua	For WBC FECOMBOX middleweight title
Win	(Mexico) Mauro Lucero	KO	3(8)	2011-12-03	Centro Banamex, Mexico City	
Win	(Mexico) Christian Solano	TKO	4(10)	2011-06-04	Foro Polanco, Mexico City, Distrito Federal, Mexico	
Win	(Mexico) Ruben Oropeza	TKO	2(8)	2011-04-30	Estadio de Beisbol Domingo Santana, Leon, Guanajuato, Mexico	
Win	(Mexico) Rito Ruvalcaba	TKO	1(12)	2011-01-01	Auditorio Centenario, Torreon, Coahuila de Zaragoza, Mexico	WBC FECOMBOX middleweight title
Win	(Mexico) Martin Avila	TKO	2(10)	2010-10-30	Gimnasio Rodrigo M. Quevado, Chihuahua, Chihuahua, Mexico	
Win	(United States) Victor Villereal	TKO	2(6)	2010-09-15	Hilton Hotel, Las Vegas, Nevada, United States	
Win	(Mexico) Miguel Angel Tena	KO	3(10)	2010-08-21	The Forum, Irapuato, Guanajuato, Mexico	
Win	(Mexico) Jose Luis Zertuche	KO	11(12)	2010-06-12	Auditorio Centenario, Gomez Palacio, Durango, Mexico	Retained WBC FECOMBOX middleweight title
Win	(Mexico) Jaime Llanes	TKO	2(12)	2010-05-15	Domo Del Mar, Ciudad Del Carmen, Campeche, Mexico	Won WBC FECOMBOX middleweight title
Loss	(Argentina) Amilcar Edgardo Funes Melian	UD	10(10)	2010-01-30	Foro Scotiabank, Polanco, Distrito Federal, Mexico	Lost WBC Youth Intercontinental light middleweight title
Win	(Colombia) Beibi Berrocal	UD	10(10)	2009-09-05	Gimnasio Rodrigo M. Quevedo, Chihuahua, Chihuahua, Mexico	Won vacant WBC Youth Intercontinental light middleweight title
Win	(Mexico) Antonio Arras	TKO	2(6)	2009-06-20	Gimnasio Oscar “Tigre” García, Ensenada, Baja California, Mexico	
Win	(Mexico) Luis Ramon Campas	MD	12(12)	2009-03-21	Gimnasio Rodrigo M. Quevedo, Chihuahua, Chihuahua, Mexico	Won vacant WBC FECOMBOX middleweight title
Win	(Mexico) Jorge Juarez	TKO	1(6)	2008-11-29	Salon Rojo, Toluca, México, Mexico	
Win	(Mexico) Saul Duran	TKO	1(10)	2008-11-01	Gimnasio Manuel Bernardo Aguirre, Chihuahua, Chihuahua, Mexico	
Win	(Mexico) Alvaro Enriquez	TKO	4(4)	2008-09-15	Arena Mexico, Mexico City, Distrito Federal, Mexico	
Win	(United States) Eusebio Cruz	TKO	3(4)	2008-07-11	American Bank Center, Corpus Christi, Texas, United States	
Win	(Mexico) Arturo Rivera	TKO	1(10)	2008-05-24	La Feria de Santa Rita, Chihuahua, Chihuahua, Mexico	
Win	(Mexico) Quirino Garcia	TKO	9(10)	2008-02-29	Gimnasio Rodrigo M. Quevado, Chihuahua, Chihuahua, Mexico	
Win	(Mexico) Miguel Zamarripa	TKO	6(8)	2007-12-14	Poliforo Juan Gabriel, Ciudad Juarez, Chihuahua, Mexico	
Win	(Mexico) Nelson Estupinan	KO	2(12)	2007-09-29	Gimnasio Rodrigo M. Quevedo, Chihuahua, Chihuahua, Mexico	Won vacant Mexico light middleweight title
Win	(Honduras) Arnold Gamboa	KO	2(10)	2007-07-13	Gimnasio Rodrigo M. Quevedo, Chihuahua, Chihuahua, Mexico	
Win	(Mexico) Luis Garcia	TKO	2(4)	2007-04-28	Gimnasio Rodrigo M. Quevedo, Chihuahua, Chihuahua, Mexico	

== Professional championships ==
Vacant Title last held by Saul Roman	Mexico light middleweight champion September 9, 2007 – March 15, 2008; Vacated	Vacant Title next held by Martin Avila
Vacant Title last held by Marco Antonio Rubio	WBC FECOMBOX middleweight champion March 21, 2009 - Present	Incumbent
Preceded by New Title	WBC Youth Intercontinental light middleweight champion 5 September 2009 – 01 January 2010	Succeeded by Amilcar Funes
