= Daniel Sandoval (boxer) =

Mexican boxer (born 1991)

Personal information
- Nickname: Galeno
- Born: Daniel Sandoval Navarro; 5 April 1991 (age 35) Guadalajara, Jalisco, Mexico
- Height: 1.85 m (6 ft 1 in)
- Weight: Light middleweight Welterweight; Light welterweight

Boxing career
- Reach: 191 cm (75 in)
- Stance: Orthodox

Boxing record
- Total fights: 44
- Wins: 39
- Win by KO: 36
- Losses: 5
- Draws: 0
- No contests: 0

Daniel Sandoval Navarro (born 5 April 1991) is a Mexican professional boxer.

== Professional career ==
On July 10, 2010, Sandoval beat prospect Ramón Álvarez by technical knockout on the Televisa Deportes undercard of Álvarez vs. Cuello.

His next fight was a win over veteran Crispin Martinez for the vacant Mexican Pacific Coast welterweight title.

== Professional record ==
34 wins (30 knockouts, 4 decisions), 2 losses, 0 draws
Res.	Record	Opponent	Type	Round	Date	Location	Notes
Win	34-2	(Colombia) Richard Gutierrez	UD	8	September 28, 2013	(United States) StubHub Center, Carson, California, U.S.	
Win	33-2	(Brazil) Claudinei Lacerda	UD	10	May 24, 2013	Tijuana, Mexico	
Win	32-2	(Mexico) Martin Avila	TKO	2 (10)	February 9, 2013	Mexico City, Mexico	
Win	31-2	(United States) Larry Smith	UD	6	December 15, 2012	(United States) Toyota Center, Houston, Texas, U.S.	
Win	30-2	(Mexico) Felipe Mota	UD	10	October 27, 2012	Apozol, Mexico	
Win	29-2	(Mexico) Gabriel Martinez	KO	5 (10)	August 11, 2012	Complejo Panamericano, Guadalajara, Mexico	
Win	28-2	(Mexico) Enrique Colin	KO	6 (10)	June 7, 2012	Las Pulgas, Tijuana, Mexico	
Win	27-2	(Mexico) Michel Rosales	TKO	5 (10)	April 14, 2012	Mexico City Arena, Mexico City Mexico	
Win	26-2	(Mexico) Jose Maria Valdez	KO	4 (8)	March 3, 2012	Auditorio Municipal, Tijuana, Mexico	
Win	25-2	(Mexico) Juan Jesus Rivera	KO	2 (10)	January 21, 2012	Coliseo Olimpico de la UDG, Guadalajara, Mexico	
Win	24-2	(Mexico) Felipe Gonzalez	KO	4 (10)	December 16, 2011	Arena Jalisco, Guadalajara, Mexico	
Win	23-2	(Mexico) Jorge Silva	TKO	10 (10)	October 8, 2011	Auditorio Municipal, Tijuana, Mexico	
Win	22-2	(Mexico) Ricardo Martinez	KO	1 (6)	August 27, 2011	Auditorio Benito Juarez, Guadalajara, Mexico	
Win	21-2	(Mexico) Isaac Garcia	TKO	1 (8)	June 18, 2011	Musica Hall, Toluca, Mexico	
Win	20-2	(Mexico) Wily Medina	KO	3 (12)	February 12, 2011	Coliseo Olimpico, Guadalajara, Mexico	Won Jalisco State welterweight title
Loss	19-2	(Mexico) Armando Robles	UD	6	November 27, 2010	Tijuana, Mexico	
Win	19-1	(Mexico) Jonathan Coronado	TKO	1 (12)	October 2, 2010	Coliseo Olimpico, Guadalajara, Mexico	
Win	18-1	(Mexico) Crispin Martinez	TKO	3 (10)	August 20, 2010	Arena Jalisco, Guadalajara, Mexico	Won Mexican Pacific Coast welterweight title
Win	17-1	(Mexico) Rodrigo Escatel	KO	1 (8)	August 6, 2010	Arena Coliseo, Guadalajara, Mexico	
Win	16-1	(Mexico) Ramón Álvarez	TKO	2 (12)	July 10, 2010	Arena VFG, Guadalajara, Mexico	Won Jalisco welterweight title
Win	15-1	(Mexico) Jesus Velasco	TKO	1 (4)	June 4, 2010	Coliseo Olimpico, Guadalajara, Mexico	
Win	14-1	(Mexico) Felipe Gonzalez	TKO	2 (10)	May 14, 2010	Arena Coliseo, Guadalajara, Mexico	Won WBC Mundo Hispano Youth welterweight title
Win	13-1	(Mexico) Ivan Rivas	KO	3 (8)	April 9, 2010	Arena Jalisco, Guadalajara, Mexico	
Win	12-1	(Mexico) Martin Ramiro	RTD	3 (6)	April 3, 2010	Coliseo Olimpico, Guadalajara, Mexico	
Win	11-1	(Mexico) Nicolas Avalos	TKO	1 (6)	March 12, 2010	Arena Jalisco, Guadalajara, Mexico	
Win	10-1	(Mexico) Luis Barragan	TKO	1 (8)	February 27, 2010	Coliseo Olimpico, Guadalajara, Mexico	
Win	9-1	(Mexico) Ivan Rodriguez	TKO	1 (6)	February 6, 2010	Panamericano, Guadalajara, Mexico	
Win	8-1	(Mexico) Agustin Rodriguez	KO	3 (4)	December 19, 2009	Jalpa, Mexico	
Loss	7-1	(Mexico) Ivan Perez	TKO	5 (12)	November 20, 2009	Arena Jalisco, Guadalajara, Mexico	For Jalisco State light welterweight title
Win	7-0	(Mexico) Genaro Contreras	TKO	1 (8)	October 12, 2009	El Cabezon, Ameca, Mexico	
Win	6-0	(Mexico) Joshua Bermudez	TKO	1 (6)	September 16, 2009	(Mexico) Velodromo internacional xalapa, Veracruz	for the national championship of the americas
Win	5-0	(Mexico) Lorenzo Juarez	TKO	3 (6)	August 22, 2009	Casino Casablanca, Tala, Mexico	
Win	4-0	(Mexico) Justino Medina	KO	2 (4)	August 1, 2009	Casino Casablanca, Tala, Mexico	
Win	3-0	(Mexico) Demetrio Pantoja	TKO	1 (4)	July 17, 2009	Club Leones, Ameca, Mexico	
Win	2-0	(Mexico) Jeronimo Almaguer	TKO	1 (4)	June 27, 2009	Club Leones, Ameca, Mexico	
Win	1-0	(Mexico) Agustin Rodriguez	KO	2 (4)	June 7, 2009	Palenque Gallos, Talpa de Allende, Mexico	
