= Luciano Cuello =

Argentine boxer

Luciano Leonel Cuello
Personal information
- Nickname: El Principito
- Nationality: (Argentina) Argentine
- Born: Luciano Leonel Cuello; 20 May 1984 (age 42) La Plata, Buenos Aires, Argentina
- Height: 5 ft 9.5 in (177 cm)
- Weight: Middleweight; Light Middleweight; Welterweight

Boxing career
- Reach: 74 in (189 cm)
- Stance: Orthodox

Boxing record
- Total fights: 39
- Wins: 35
- Win by KO: 17
- Losses: 4
- Draws: 0
- No contests: 0

Luciano Leonel Cuello (born 20 May 1984, in La Plata, Buenos Aires, Argentina) is an Argentine boxer in the Light Middleweight division. Luciano is the current WBC Latino Welterweight and former WBO Latino Light Middleweight Champion.

== Pro career ==
On 28 March 2009 Cuello lost a 10-round Unanimous Decision to top Prospect, Mexican Julio Jr.

In July 2010 Luciano fought top Welterweight Contender, Canelo Álvarez. The bout was held in Vicente Fernández Arena. The Mexican fighter Álvarez beat Cuello by TKO in the sixth round.

=== Professional record ===
35 Wins (17 knockouts), 4 Losses, 0 Draw
Res.	Record	Opponent	Type	Rd., Time	Date	Location	Notes
Loss	35-4	(United States) Julian Williams	TKO	1 (10)	2015-09-22	(United States) Sands Casino, Bethlehem, Pennsylvania, USA	
Win	35-3	(Romania) Rafael Chiruta	UD	8 (8)	2014-11-21	Hotel El Asador de Enrique, Madrid, Spain	
Win	34-3	(Argentina) Martín Fidel Ríos	UD	12 (12)	2014-05-24	Club Atenas, La Plata, Buenos Aires, Argentina	Retain South American light middleweight title and WBC Latino light middleweight title
Win	33-3	(Argentina) Juan José Días	KO	4 (12)	2013-11-22	Club Gimnasia y Esgrima La Plata, La Plata, Argentina	Won South American light middleweight title and WBC Latino light middleweight title
Loss	32-3	(United States) Willie Nelson	UD	10 (10)	2013-06-29	(United States) MGM Grand at Foxwoods Resort, Mashantucket, Connecticut, USA	
Win	32-2	(Brazil) Joaquim Carneiro	RTD	8 (12)	2013-03-22	Club Universitario, La Plata, Buenos Aires, Argentina	
Win	31-2	(Brazil) Samir Santos Barbosa	TKO	11 (12)	2012-09-14	Club Universitario, La Plata, Buenos Aires, Argentina	
Win	30-2	(Argentina) Carlos Wilfredo Vilches	UD	12 (12)	2011-09-09	Gualeguaychú, Entre Rios, Argentina	
Win	29-2	(Brazil) Uilian Santana Barauna	KO	2 (8)	2011-07-02	Asociación Cultural y Deportiva Universal, La Plata, Buenos Aires, Argentina	Won vacant South American light middleweight title
Win	28-2	(Argentina) Mariano Andrés Carranza	UD	8 (8)	2011-04-09	Asociación Cultural y Deportiva Universal, La Plata, Buenos Aires, Argentina	
Win	27-2	(Argentina) Elvio Matias Figueroa	TKO	5 (6)	2011-01-02	Racing Athletic Club, General Lamadrid, Buenos Aires, Argentina	
Loss	26-2	(Mexico) Canelo Álvarez	TKO	6 (0:32)	2010-07-10	Arena VFG, Guadalajara, Jalisco, Mexico	Vacant WBC Silver Light Middleweight title
Win	26-1	(Nicaragua) Carlos Velásquez	UD	10 (10)	2009-12-12	Club Atenas, La Plata, Buenos Aires, Argentina	Interim WBC Latino Welterweight title
Win	25-1	(Slovakia) Miro Dicky	TKO	3 (1:08)	2009-11-20	Palma Arena, Islas Baleares, Spain	
Win	24-1	(Spain) Marcos Muñoz	TKO	1 (0:14)	2009-10-10	Polideportivo Jose Caballero, Madrid, Spain	
Loss	23-1	(Mexico) Julio César Chávez Jr.	UD	10 (10)	2009-03-28	Plaza de Toros, Tijuana, Baja California, Mexico	WBC Latino Light Middleweight title
Win	23-0	(Romania) Florin Bogdan	UD	6 (6)	2008-10-31	Alcobendas, Comunidad de Madrid, Spain	
Win	22-0	(Argentina) Jorge Ariel Isa	TKO	4 (8)	2008-05-10	Asociación Cultural y Deportiva Universal, La Plata, Buenos Aires, Argentina	
Win	21-0	(Argentina) Alejandro Gustavo Falliga	MD	10 (10)	2007-12-22	Asociación Cultural y Deportiva Universal, La Plata, Buenos Aires, Argentina	
Win	20-0	(Argentina) Cristian Ricardo Rizzo	UD	8 (8)	2007-11-16	Asociación Cultural y Deportiva Universal, La Plata, Buenos Aires, Argentina	
Win	19-0	(Argentina) Américo Rodolfo Sagania	UD	12 (12)	2007-09-15	Estadio U.P.C.N., Los Hornos, Buenos Aires, Argentina	
Win	18-0	(Argentina) Adrian Marcelo Nieva	KO	3 (12)	2007-07-21	Estadio U.P.C.N., Los Hornos, Buenos Aires, Argentina	
Win	17-0	(Argentina) Jorge Ariel Isa	TKO	6 (8)	2007-06-16	Club Estrella del Sud, La Plata, Buenos Aires, Argentina	
Win	16-0	(Argentina) Cristian Ricardo Rizzo	UD	8 (8)	2007-05-19	Club Estrella del Sur, La Plata, Buenos Aires, Argentina	
Win	15-0	(Argentina) Ramón Argentino Guidetti	RTD	4 (8)	2007-04-21	Club Alumni, La Plata, Buenos Aires, Argentina	
Win	14-0	(Argentina) Cristian Ricardo Rizzo	UD	6 (6)	2006-12-23	Club Estrella del Sur, La Plata, Buenos Aires, Argentina	
Win	13-0	(Argentina) Wálter Acuna	UD	6 (6)	2006-09-09	Club Alumni, La Plata, Buenos Aires, Argentina	
Win	12-0	(Argentina) Ariel Oscar Pieroni	UD	6 (6)	2006-07-22	Club Unidos del Dique, La Plata, Buenos Aires, Argentina	
Win	11-0	(Argentina) Diego Ariel Álvarez	UD	6 (6)	2006-06-09	Club Unidos del Dique, La Plata, Buenos Aires, Argentina	
Win	10-0	(Argentina) Adolfo Dionisio Rios	RTD	3 (6)	2006-04-29	Club Unidos del Dique, La Plata, Buenos Aires, Argentina	
Win	9-0	(Argentina) Diego Ariel Álvarez	TKO	3 (6)	2005-12-10	La Plata, Buenos Aires, Argentina	
Win	8-0	(Argentina) Alberto Daniel Medina	KO	1 (6)	2005-11-12	Club Unidos del Dique, La Plata, Buenos Aires, Argentina	
Win	7-0	(Argentina) Nicolas Perillo	UD	4 (4)	2005-09-10	Club El Ancla, La Plata, Buenos Aires, Argentina	
Win	6-0	(Argentina) Fabio Carlos Vives	TKO	1 (4)	2005-07-23	Club Unidos del Dique, La Plata, Buenos Aires, Argentina	
Win	5-0	(Argentina) Walter Acuna	UD	4 (4)	2005-05-13	La Plata, Buenos Aires, Argentina	
Win	4-0	(Argentina) Walter Vazquez	TKO	1 (4)	2005-04-08	La Plata, Buenos Aires, Argentina	
Win	3-0	(Argentina) Jorge Raul Campos	UD	4 (4)	2004-12-17	La Plata, Buenos Aires, Argentina	
Win	2-0	(Argentina) Jose Enrique Gomez	UD	4 (4)	2004-11-13	La Plata, Buenos Aires, Argentina	
Win	1-0	(Argentina) Daniel Alejandro Vazquez	KO	2 (4)	2004-10-08	La Plata, Buenos Aires, Argentina	
