= Arena VFG =

Indoor arena in Guadalajara, Jalisco, Mexico

Coordinates: 20°28′2″N 103°15′48″W

Arena V.F.G.
- Arena V.F.G.
- Interactive map of Arena V.F.G.
- Location: Tlajomulco de Zúñiga, Guadalajara metropolitan area, Mexico
- Owner: María del Refugio Abarca
- Capacity: 15,000
- Surface: Concrete

Construction
- Groundbreaking: December 23, 2008
- Opened: 2009
- Cost: $80 million

Arena V.F.G. is an indoor arena located in Tlajomulco de Zúñiga, part of Guadalajara metropolitan area, Mexico. The arena can accommodate between 3,500 and 15,000 people. It is mainly used for sporting events and concerts.

== Name ==
The arena is named after Mexican singer Vicente Fernández, using the initials V.F.G. to represent the singer's full name Vicente Fernández Gómez. The arena was used to tribute and say the last good bye to the singer on December 12 and 13, 2021 after his death.

=== Sporting Events ===
The arena was the site for a fight between Mexican Saul "El Canelo" Alvarez and Luciano Leonel Cuello of Argentina. The fight was the Main Event of a broadcast by Televisa. The Mexican fighter Alvarez beat Cuello by TKO in the sixth round. Vicente Fernández himself offered to give Alvarez a horse, when Vicente sat down for the post fight interview with Saul and Oscar De La Hoya.

=== Concerts ===
Artists, including Phil Collins, Peter Gabriel, Muse, Laura Pausini, Robbie Williams, Kiss, Oasis, Paramore, Depeche Mode, Shakira, Ricky Martin, Red Hot Chili Peppers, t.A.T.u., Gwen Stefani, Hilary Duff, High School Musical, Jordan Pruitt, Sarah Brightman, Aerosmith, Heaven & Hell, Down, Twenty One Pilots, Morrissey, Gloria Gaynor, Guns N' Roses, Judas Priest, Keane, Korn, Iron Maiden, Rammstein, Celine Dion, Harry Styles, Niall Horan, Megadeth, The 1975 and Billie Eilish have previously performed or are scheduled to perform at the arena.
