= Dominik Britsch =

German boxer

Personal information
- Nationality: German
- Born: 21 October 1987 (age 38) Bad Friedrichshall, West Germany
- Height: 5 ft 9 1/2 in (177 cm)
- Weight: Super middleweight

Boxing career
- Stance: Orthodox

Boxing record
- Total fights: 36
- Wins: 32
- Win by KO: 11
- Losses: 3
- Draws: 1

Dominik Britsch (born 21 October 1987) is a German professional boxer. He is last EBU-EU (European Union) middleweight title, and is vacant Germany BDB middleweight champion.

== Professional boxing record ==
35 fights, 32 wins (11 knockouts), 3 losses, 1 draw, 0 NC
No.	Result	Record	Opponent	Type	Rd., Time	Date	Location	Notes
36	Loss	32–3–1	(Mexico) Julio César Chávez Jr.	UD	10	10 Dec 2016	Monterrey, Nuevo León, Mexico	
35	Win	32–2–1	(Bosnia and Herzegovina) Slavisa Simeunovic	UD	8	27 Feb 2016	Gerry Weber Stadium, Halle, Nordrhein-Westfalen, Germany	
