= Jorge Páez Jr. =

Mexican boxer (born 1987)

Personal information
- Nickname: El Maromerito
- Born: Jorge Páez Jr. 30 November 1987 (age 38) Mexicali, Baja California, Mexico
- Height: 1.78 m (5 ft 10 in)
- Weight: Lightweight; Light welterweight Welterweight

Boxing career
- Reach: 185 cm (73 in)
- Stance: Orthodox

Boxing record
- Total fights: 59
- Wins: 42
- Win by KO: 25
- Losses: 14
- Draws: 2
- No contests: 1

Jorge Páez Jr. (born 30 November 1987) is a Mexican professional boxer. His brother is welterweight prospect Azriel Páez and his father is the former world champion Jorge Páez.

== Professional career ==
On 5 June 2010 Páez fought on a boxing card that also featured his younger brother Azriel; both of them won their fights.

== Professional boxing record ==
56 fights	40 wins	13 losses
By knockout	24	4
By decision	16	9
Draws	2	
No contests	1	

40 wins (24 knockouts, 16 decisions), 13 losses, 2 draws, 1 no contest
Res.	Record	Opponent	Type	Rd., Time	Date	Location	Notes
Loss	40-13-2	(Argentina) Gustavo Daniel Lemos	KO	2 (10)	2019-03-30	Club Huracán, Tres Arroyos, Argentina	
Loss	40-12-2	(Argentina) Jose Carlos Paz	TKO	9 (10)	2018-09-29	Deportivo Trabajadores del Metro, Iztacalco, Mexico	
Loss	40-11-2	(Mexico) Ramón Álvarez	UD	10	2018-04-21	Domo del Parque San Rafael, Guadalajara, Jalisco, Mexico	
Loss	40-10-2	(Argentina) Jose Carlos Paz	UD	10	2017-10-07	(Mexico) Gimnasio de la AUT, Tampico	
Win	40-9-2	(Mexico) Daniel Sandoval	RTD	3 (10)	2017-03-25	(Mexico) Gimnasio Municipal, Palenque	
Loss	39-9-2	(Mexico) Johnny Navarrete	UD	10	2016-12-03	(Mexico) Polideportivo Centenario, Los Mochis	
Loss	39-8-2	(Mexico) Antonio Margarito	UD	10	2016-03-05	Arena Ciudad de Mexico, Mexico City	
Loss	39-7-2	(Mexico) Carlos Ocampo	UD	10	2015-11-28	(Mexico) Arena Tequisquiapan, Tequisquiapan	
Win	39-6-2	(Mexico) Daniel Echeverria	MD	10	2015-08-29	(Mexico) El Domo, San Luis Potosi	
Loss	38-6-2	(United States) Jose Benavidez	TKO	12 (12)	2015-05-15	(United States) US Airway Centre, Phoenix	For interim WBA Super Lightweight Title
Win	38-5-2	(Colombia) Ronald Montes	KO	4 (10)	2015-02-21	(Mexico) Auditorio Municipal, Ocozocoautla	
Draw	37-5-2	(Mexico) Aaron Herrera	TD	6 (10)	2014-10-11	(Mexico) Coliseo Yucatan, Merida	Accidental rabbit punch.
Loss	37-5-1	(Guyana) Vivian Harris	SD	10	2014-03-22	(Mexico) Arena Monterrey, Monterrey	

== See also ==
- Notable boxing families
