= Julio César Chávez Jr. vs. Sergio Martínez =

Boxing match

- Date: September 15, 2012
- Venue: Thomas & Mack Center, Las Vegas, Nevada, USA
- Titles on the line: WBC/The Ring middleweight titles

Tale of the tape
Boxer	(Mexico) Julio César Chávez Jr.	(Argentina) Sergio Martínez
Nickname	"La Leyenda Continua"	"Maravilla"
Hometown	Culiacan, Sinaloa, Mexico	Quilmes, Buenos Aires, Argentina
Purse	$3,000,000	$1,400,000
Pre-fight record	46–0–1 (1) (32 KO)	49–2–2 (28 KO)
Age	26 years, 6 months	37 years, 6 months
Height	6 ft 1 in (185 cm)	5 ft 10 in (178 cm)
Weight	159 lb (72 kg)	158 lb (72 kg)
Style	Orthodox	Orthodox
Recognition	WBC; Middleweight Champion; The Ring; No. 3 Ranked Middleweight	The Ring; Middleweight Champion; The Ring No. 3 ranked pound-for-pound fighter 2-division world champion

Result
- Martínez defeated Chávez by unanimous decision

Julio César Chávez Jr. vs. Sergio Martínez was a professional boxing match contested on September 15, 2012, for the WBC and The Ring Middleweight championship.

== Background ==
After winning the middleweight championship against Kelly Pavlik in April 2010, Sergio Martínez made one defence of the WBC belt before he was stripped for not facing "Interim" champion Sebastian Zbik. Zbik would be promoted to full champion but would lose the belt in his first defence to Julio César Chávez Jr. Nevertheless, despite Chávez's godfather Jose Sulaiman attempting to block the bout, Chávez agreed to challenge Martínez.

Martínez trained for the fight in Oxnard, California under his career long time coach, Gabriel Sarmiento.

== The fight ==
Martínez out worked and out landed Chávez throughout the first 11 rounds of the fight, in dominant fashion. Though Chávez had his moments, Martínez used his fast lateral movement to avoid and neutralize Chávez' offensive attack. Chávez hurt Martinez in the 12th round, sending him to the canvas halfway through the round. Martínez got up with a little over one minute left in the fight, and rather than clinch or hold on to Chávez, Martínez continued to throw and trade blows with the Mexican. Despite being fatigued and clearly hurt, Martínez managed to survive the 12th round without holding. Martínez won the fight by unanimous decision, by the scores of 117–110, 118–109, and 118–109.

== Aftermath ==
After the fight, it was revealed that Martínez had broken his left hand (as early as the 4th round) and torn his right meniscus, the latter of which would require surgery. Shortly afterwards, Chávez tested positive for cannabis. As a result, he received a fine of $20,000 and was indefinitely suspended by the World Boxing Council.

A total of 16,939 tickets were sold to generate a live gate of $3,052,475. HBO reported the fight generated 475,000 pay-per-view buys and close to $25 million in revenue.

== Undercard ==
Confirmed bouts:

== Broadcasting ==
Country	Broadcaster
Argentina	TyC Sports
Australia	Main Event
Denmark	TV2 Sport
Hungary	Sport 1
Mexico	Azteca 7
Poland	Polsat Sport
United Kingdom	Primetime
United States	HBO

Preceded by vs. Andy Lee	Julio César Chávez Jr.'s bouts September 15, 2012	Succeeded by vs. Brian Vera
Preceded by vs. Matthew Macklin	Sergio Martínez's bouts September 15, 2012	Succeeded by vs. Martin Murray
Awards
Preceded by Alfredo Angulo vs. James Kirkland; Round 1	The Ring Round of the Year; Round 12; 2012	Succeeded by Timothy Bradley vs. Ruslan Provodnikov; Round 6
