= Kelly Pavlik vs. Sergio Martínez =

- Date: April 17, 2010
- Venue: Boardwalk Hall, Atlantic City, New Jersey, U.S.
- Title(s) on the line: WBC, WBO and The Ring middleweight title

Tale of the tape
Boxer	(United States) Kelly Pavlik	(Argentina) Sergio Martínez
Nickname	"The Ghost"	"Maravilla"
Hometown	Youngstown, Ohio, U.S.	Quilmes, Buenos Aires, Argentina
Pre-fight record	36–1 (32 KO)	44–2–2 (24 KO)
Age	28 years	35 years, 1 month
Height	6 ft 2 1/2 in (189 cm)	5 ft 10 in (178 cm)
Weight	159 1/2 lb (72 kg)	159 1/2 lb (72 kg)
Style	Orthodox	Southpaw
Recognition	WBC, WBO and The Ring; Middleweight Champion	WBC; Light Middleweight Champion; The Ring; No. 1 Ranked Light Middleweight

Result
- Martínez defeated Pavlik by unanimous decision

Kelly Pavlik vs. Sergio Martínez was a professional boxing match contested on April 17, 2010, for the WBC, WBO and The Ring middleweight championship.

== Background ==
Following his 5th round stoppage win over Miguel Espino in December 2009, Pavlik was set to fight former Welterweight champion Paul Williams. However, due to a major staph infection and an allergic reaction to some antibiotics that nearly killed him, Pavlik was forced to drop out of the fight.

He was eventually able to fight again, agreeing to face WBC Light Middleweight Champion Sergio Martínez, who in his last bout was on the receiving end of a controversial majority decision against Williams in his first bout at Middleweight.

== The fight ==
Martínez controlled the early rounds with quick in and out movements, refusing to heavily engage with Pavlik. Martínez managed to cut Pavlik's left eyebrow in the first round. Pavlik then started to mount a comeback from round 5 by blocking Martínez's punches more effectively. Pavlik spent most of his time headhunting trying to land a hard right, which did help Pavlik score a knock-down in the seventh round, however Martinez would later claimed it was an accidental fall, when their feet got tangled up. In the last four rounds, Martínez would back and started to open up Pavlik's cuts more, making his face extremely bloody. All three judges scored the bout for Martínez with cards of 116–111, 115–111 & 115–112. HBO's unofficial scorer Harold Lederman scored the fight 115–112 for Martínez as did the Associated Press.

== Aftermath ==
In the post-fight interview, Pavlik stated that he could not see due to the blood from the cut above both of his eyebrows.

With Martínez winning the middleweight championship, he was required to make some decisions regarding his WBC light middleweight title. The sanctioning organizations for boxing recognize that boxers may choose to move up or down in the weight categories, yet they also wish to make all championship belts available to challenge. As such, their rules prohibit a fighter from simultaneously holding belts in multiple divisions. This prohibition includes holding a title with one sanctioning organization while also holding a title in a different weight class with a different organization. Eight weeks after the Pavlik fight, when Martínez failed to announce a preference to be a light middleweight or a middleweight champion (the WBO rules allow ten days to decide), the WBO stripped him of their middleweight title. A week later, Martínez did inform the WBC that he was willing to vacate their Light Middleweight title and maintain his WBC Middleweight belt.

Although there was a rematch clause in the contract, Pavlik chose not to enforce it, stating his desire to move up in weight.

== Undercard ==
Confirmed bouts:

== Broadcasting ==
Country	Broadcaster
Australia	Main Event
Hungary	Sport 2
Poland	Polsat Sport Extra
United States	HBO

Preceded by vs. Miguel Espino	Kelly Pavlik's bouts 17 April 2010	Succeeded by vs. Alfonso López III
Preceded by vs. Paul Williams	Sergio Martínez's bouts 17 April 2010	Succeeded by vs. Paul Williams II
