= Badeaux =

Badeaux is a surname. Notable people with the surname include:

- Jean-Baptiste Badeaux (1741–1796), Canadian state notary
  - Joseph Badeaux (1777–1835), his son, Canadian notary, militia captain, and politician
- Roberto Palazuelos (Roberto Palazuelos Badeaux, born 1967), Mexican actor

== See also ==
- Badea (disambiguation)
- Badeau
