= Sergio Martínez vs. Sergiy Dzinziruk =

Boxing competition

The Threat Is Real
- Date: March 12, 2011
- Venue: Foxwoods Resort Casino, Mashantucket, Connecticut, U.S.
- Title(s) on the line: The Ring middleweight championship

Tale of the tape
Boxer	(Argentina) Sergio Martínez	(Ukraine) Sergiy Dzinziruk
Nickname	"Maravilla"	"Dzyna"
Hometown	Quilmes, Buenos Aires, Argentina	Brovari, Ukraine
Purse	$1,200,000	$850,000
Pre-fight record	46–2–2 (25 KO's)	37–0 (23 KO's)
Age	36 years	35 years
Height	5 ft 10 in (178 cm)	6 ft 0 in (183 cm)
Weight	159 lb (72 kg)	159 lb (72 kg)
Style	Southpaw	Orthodox
Recognition	The Ring; Middleweight Champion; The Ring No. 4 ranked pound-for-pound fighter 2-division world champion	WBO; Junior Middleweight Champion; The Ring; No. 8 Ranked Junior Middleweight

Result
- Martínez defeats Dzinziruk via 8th round knockout.

Sergio Martínez vs. Sergiy Dzindziruk, billed as The Threat Is Real, was a professional boxing match contested on March 12, 2011, for The Ring middleweight championship.

== Background ==
Having stripped by the WBC after HBO declined to broadcast a bout between him and "Interim" champion Sebastian Zbik, Sergio Martínez defended his Lineal and Ring titles on the line against WBO 154 champion, Sergiy Dzindziruk.

== The fight ==
Martínez stopped Sergiy Dzinziruk in the eighth round, knocking down the Ukrainian middleweight five times during the fight, and three times in the 8th/last round. In Round 5, Dzinziruk was knocked down again by a left hand just seconds before the bell rang. He got up smiling, but Martínez now firmly appeared to be in control of the fight. Referee Arthur Mercante Jr. stopped the bout at the eighth after Martínez of Oxnard, California, sent Dzinziruk down for the third time.

== Aftermath ==
Martínez would next Darren Barker, after new WBC champ Julio Cesar Chavez Jr., Daniel Geale, Miguel Cotto, Andy Lee and Paul Williams, all refused to fight him.

== Undercard ==
Confirmed bouts:

=== Televised ===
- Middleweight bout: (Argentina) Sergio Martínez vs. (Ukraine) Sergiy Dzinziruk
  - Martínez defeated Dzinziruk via technical knockout at 1:43 of eighth round.
- Middleweight bout: (Republic of Ireland) Andy Lee vs. (United Kingdom) Craig McEwan
  - Lee defeated McEwan via knockout at 0:56 of tenth round.

=== Untelevised ===
- Featherweight bout: (Dominican Republic) Javier Fortuna vs. (United States) Derrick Wilson
  - Fortuna defeated Wilson via knockout of at eighth round.
- Heavyweight bout: (Greece) Sonya Lamonakis vs. (United States) Tanzee Daniel
  - Lamonakis defeated Daniel via unanimous decision.
- Welterweight bout: (United States) Abraham Lopez vs. (United States) Andrew Jones
  - Lopez defeated Jones via unanimous decision.
- Light Heavyweight bout: (United States) Seanie Monaghan vs. (United States) Billy Cunningham
  - Monaghan defeated Cunningham via unanimous decision.
- Welterweight bout: (Puerto Rico) Thomas Dulorme vs. (United States) Guillermo Valdes
  - Dulorme defeated Valdes via technical knockout at 0:46 of second round.

== Broadcasting ==
Country	Broadcaster
United States	HBO

Preceded by vs. Paul Williams II	Sergio Martínez's bouts March 12, 2011	Succeeded by vs. Darren Barker
Preceded by vs. Daniel Dawson	Sergiy Dzinziruk's bouts March 12, 2011	Succeeded by vs. Jonathan González Ortiz
