= Sergio Martínez vs. Paul Williams II =

Boxing competition

The Explosive Rematch
- Date: November 20, 2010
- Venue: Boardwalk Hall, Atlantic City, New Jersey, U.S.
- Title(s) on the line: WBC and The Ring middleweight title

Tale of the tape
Boxer	(Argentina) Sergio Martínez	(United States) Paul Williams
Nickname	"Maravilla"	"The Punisher"
Hometown	Quilmes, Buenos Aires, Argentina	Aiken, South Carolina, U.S.
Pre-fight record	45–2–2 (24 KO)	39–1 (27 KO)
Age	35 years, 8 months	29 years, 3 months
Height	5 ft 10 in (178 cm)	6 ft 1 1/2 in (187 cm)
Weight	157 1/2 lb (71 kg)	156 lb (71 kg)
Style	Southpaw	Southpaw
Recognition	WBC and The Ring; Middleweight Champion; The Ring No. 6 ranked pound-for-pound fighter 2-division world champion	WBC/The Ring; No. 2 Ranked Middleweight; The Ring No. 5 ranked pound-for-pound fighter Former welterweight champion

Result
- Martínez wins via 2nd–round KO

Sergio Martínez vs. Paul Williams, billed as The Explosive Rematch, was the rematch between Martínez and Williams which took place on November 20, 2010.

== Background ==
They last fought in December 2009 with Williams winning a controversial 12-round majority decision at the Boardwalk Hall in Atlantic City, New Jersey. Williams landed more shots in the fight, but Martínez landed the cleaner punches throughout.

Martínez was making his first title defense after defeating Kelly Pavlik for the WBC, WBO, Lineal and The Ring middleweight titles on April 17, 2010. Williams had also fought once since their initial meeting, winning a four-round technical decision against Kermit Cintron in a May junior middleweight bout, after Cintron fell out of the ring and injured his head.

One of the reasons it took so long to finalize Martínez-Williams II was because the Williams camp was not eager for the fight. Dan Goossen hoped to line up a big fight for Williams at welterweight, where he used to hold a title, against an opponent such as Manny Pacquiao or Shane Mosley.

When promoter Lou DiBella ran out of patience waiting for the Williams side to accept the fight in mid-August, DiBella cut off talks and offered the fight to junior middleweight contender Alfredo "El Perro" Angulo, a network staple in recent years. However, when Angulo turned down $750,000, a career-high purse by more than double, Martínez's camp made another run at Williams and this time accepting the fight on November 20.

At the time of the fight, Paul Williams and Sergio Martínez held the 5th and 6th spots, respectively, in The Ring’s pound-for-pound rankings. Consequently, boxing experts generally agreed that the winner would emerge as the third-best active fighter in the world, behind Manny Pacquiao and Floyd Mayweather Jr.

== The fight ==
The HBO-televised fight took place at Boardwalk Hall, Atlantic City, New Jersey, United States.

The fight was billed as a potential "fight of the year", however the fight ended abruptly and dramatically when Sergio Martínez delivered a knockout blow with 2:02 left in the 2nd round of the scheduled 12 round fight. The punch was a short left hook that caught Williams right on the chin, as he attempted to deliver a left-hand of his own. Williams' right hand was at his waist when the punch landed, rendering Paul Williams unconscious upon contact.

== Aftermath ==
For that fight, Martínez would receive The Ring magazine Knockout of the Year award and, added to his previous victory over Kelly Pavlik, he was also named Fighter of the Year by The Ring and BWAA. Martínez was later stripped by the WBC after HBO declined to broadcast a bout between him and "Interim" champion Sebastian Zbik.

== Undercard ==
Confirmed bouts:

=== Televised ===
- Middleweight Championship: (Argentina) Sergio Martínez (c) vs (United States) Paul Williams

Martínez defeats Williams via KO at 1:10 of round 2.

=== Untelevised ===
- Middleweight bout: (Dominican Republic) Fernando Guerrero vs (United States) Willis Lockett

Guerrero defeats Lockett via TKO at 1:06 of round 4.

- Heavyweight bout: (United States) Tony Thompson vs (United States) Paul Marinaccio

Thompson defeats Marinaccio via TKO at 2:02 of round 4.

- Welterweight bout: (United States) Willie Nelson vs. (United States) Quinton Whitaker

Nelson defeats Whitaker via TKO at 2:22 of round 1.

- Featherweight bout: (Puerto Rico) Luis Orlando Del Valle vs (Mexico) Noe Lopez Jr.

Del Valle defeats Lopez Jr via TKO at 1:48 of round 3.

- Cruiserweight bout: (Hungary) Zsolt Erdei vs (Kenya) Samson Onyango

Erdei defeats Onyango via unanimous decision (79–73, 80–72, 80–72). This was Erdei's first fight in a year.

- Welterweight bout: (United States) Steve Upsher Chambers vs (Mongolia) Bayan Jargal

== Broadcasting ==
Country	Broadcaster
United States	HBO

Preceded by vs. Kelly Pavlik	Sergio Martínez's bouts November 20, 2010	Succeeded by vs. Sergiy Dzinziruk
Preceded by vs. Kermit Cintrón	Paul Williams's bouts November 20, 2010	Succeeded by vs. Erislandy Lara
Awards
Preceded by Ricky Hatton vs. Manny Pacquiao	The Ring Knockout of the Year; 2010	Succeeded by Fernando Montiel vs. Nonito Donaire
