= Bădescu =

Bădescu is a Romanian surname that may refer to:

- Andrei Bădescu
- Constantion Bădescu
- Ionuț Bădescu
- Gheorghe Bădescu
- Otilia Bădescu
- Ramona Badescu (author)
- Ramona Badescu

== Others ==
- Valea lui Bădescu River

== See also ==
- Badea (disambiguation)
- Bădeni (disambiguation)
- Bădila (disambiguation)
- Bădești (disambiguation)
