= Bădeni =

Bădeni may refer to the following places in Romania:

- Bădeni, a village in Stoenești Commune, Argeș County
- Bădeni, a village in Moldovenești Commune, Cluj County
- Bădeni, a village in Runcu Commune, Dâmbovița County
- Bădeni, a village in Mărtiniș Commune, Harghita County
- Bădeni, a village in Scobinți Commune, Iași County
- Bădeni, a village in Dănicei Commune, Vâlcea County
- Bădeni, a tributary of the Arieș in Cluj County
- Valea Bădenilor, a tributary of the Dâmbovița in Argeș County

== See also ==
- House of Badeni
- Count Kasimir Felix Badeni, (1846–1909), Austrian Minister-President
- Badea (disambiguation)
- Bădila (disambiguation)
- Bădești (disambiguation)
- Bădescu (surname)
