= The Ring magazine Knockout of the Year =

Combat magazine award

The Ring magazine was established in 1922 and has named a Knockout of the Year since 1989, based on the magazine's writers' criteria.

== Knockouts of the Year by decade ==
=== 1980s ===
- 1989: (United States) Michael Nunn KO 1 (Italy) Sumbu Kalambay – see Michael Nunn vs. Sumbu Kalambay

=== 1990s ===
- 1990: (United States) Terry Norris KO 1 (Uganda) John Mugabi – see John Mugabi vs. Terry Norris
- 1991: no award given
- 1992: (Philippines) Morris East KO 11 (Japan) Akinobu Hiranaka
  ... tie: (United States) Kennedy McKinney KO 11 (South Africa) Welcome Ncita
- 1993: (United States) Gerald McClellan TKO 5 (United States Virgin Islands) Julian Jackson see Julian Jackson vs. Gerald McClellan
- 1994: (United States) George Foreman KO 10 (United States) Michael Moorer – see Michael Moorer vs. George Foreman
- 1995: (Argentina) Julio César Vásquez KO 11 (United States) Carl Daniels see Carl Daniels vs. Julio César Vásquez
- 1996: (Puerto Rico) Wilfredo Vázquez KO 11 (Venezuela) Eloy Rojas
- 1997: (Canada) Arturo Gatti KO 5 (Mexico) Gabriel Ruelas
- 1998: (United States) Roy Jones Jr. KO 4 (United States) Virgil Hill see Roy Jones Jr. vs. Virgil Hill
- 1999: (United States) Derrick Jefferson KO 6 (United States) Maurice Harris

=== 2000s ===
- 2000: (Ghana) Ben Tackie KO 10 (United States) Robert Garcia
- 2001: (United Kingdom) Lennox Lewis KO 4 (United States) Hasim Rahman – see Hasim Rahman vs. Lennox Lewis II
- 2002: (United Kingdom) Lennox Lewis KO 8 (United States) Mike Tyson – see Lennox Lewis vs. Mike Tyson
- 2003: (United States) Rocky Juarez KO 10 (Dominican Republic) Antonio Diaz
- 2004: (United States) Antonio Tarver KO 2 (United States) Roy Jones Jr. – see Roy Jones Jr. vs. Antonio Tarver II
- 2005: (United States) Allan Green KO 1 (United States) Jaidon Codrington
- 2006: (United States) Calvin Brock KO 6 (United States) Zuri Lawrence
- 2007: (Philippines) Nonito Donaire TKO 5 (Armenia) Vic Darchinyan
- 2008: (Colombia) Edison Miranda KO 3 (United States) David Banks
- 2009: (Philippines) Manny Pacquiao KO 2 (United Kingdom) Ricky Hatton – see Ricky Hatton vs. Manny Pacquiao

=== 2010s ===
- 2010: (Argentina) Sergio Martínez KO 2 (United States) Paul Williams – see Sergio Martínez vs. Paul Williams II
- 2011: (Philippines) Nonito Donaire TKO 2 (Mexico) Fernando Montiel – see Fernando Montiel vs. Nonito Donaire
- 2012: (Mexico) Juan Manuel Márquez KO 6 (Philippines) Manny Pacquiao – see Manny Pacquiao vs. Juan Manuel Márquez IV
- 2013: (Canada) Adonis Stevenson TKO 1 (United States) Chad Dawson
- 2014: (United Kingdom) Carl Froch KO 8 (United Kingdom) George Groves – see Carl Froch vs. George Groves II
- 2015: (Mexico) Canelo Álvarez KO 3 (United States) James Kirkland – see Canelo Álvarez vs. James Kirkland
- 2016: (Mexico) Canelo Álvarez KO 6 (United Kingdom) Amir Khan – see Canelo Álvarez vs. Amir Khan
- 2017: (Canada) David Lemieux KO 3 (United States) Curtis Stevens
- 2018: (Japan) Naoya Inoue KO 1 (Dominican Republic) Juan Carlos Payano
- 2019: (United States) Deontay Wilder KO 7 (Cuba) Luis Ortiz – see Deontay Wilder vs. Luis Ortiz II

=== 2020s ===
- 2020: (United States) Gervonta Davis KO 6 (Mexico) Léo Santa Cruz
- 2021: (United States) Gabriel Rosado KO 3 (Uzbekistan) Bektemir Melikuziev
- 2022: (United Kingdom) Leigh Wood TKO 12 (Republic of Ireland) Michael Conlan
- 2023: (Japan) Junto Nakatani KO 12 (Australia) Andrew Moloney
- 2024: (United Kingdom) Daniel Dubois KO 5 (United Kingdom) Anthony Joshua – see Anthony Joshua vs Daniel Dubois
- 2025: (United States) Brian Norman Jr. KO 5 (Japan) Jin Sasaki

== See also ==
- The Ring magazine Fight of the Year
- The Ring magazine Fighter of the Year
- BWAA Fighter of the Year
