= Bădești =

Bădești may refer to several places in Romania:

- Bădești, a village in Bârla Commune, Argeș County
- Bădești, a village in Pietroșani Commune, Argeș County
- Bădești, a village in Vultureni Commune, Cluj County
- Bădești, a village in Brănești Commune, Gorj County
- Bădești, a tributary of the river Borșa in Cluj County

== See also ==
- Badea (disambiguation)
- Bădeni (disambiguation)
- Bădila (disambiguation)
- Bădescu (surname)
