= Bădila =

Bădila may refer to several villages in Romania:

- Bădila, a village in Valea Iașului Commune, Argeș County
- Bădila, a village in Pârscov Commune, Buzău County

== See also ==
- Badea (disambiguation)
- Bădeni (disambiguation)
- Bădești (disambiguation)
- Bădescu (surname)
