= Badeau =

Badeau is a surname. Notable people with the surname include:

- Adam Badeau (1831–1895), American author, Union Army officer, and diplomat
- John S. Badeau (1903–1995), American diplomat, engineer, minister, and scholar

== See also ==
- Badea (disambiguation)
- Badeaux
