= Lansingville =

Coordinates: 41°4′N 80°38′W

- Interactive map of Lansingville
- Country: United States
- State: Ohio
- County: Mahoning
- City: Youngstown

Lansingville is a neighborhood in Youngstown, Ohio. Located on the city's south side, the area was named for John Lansing. The neighborhood was dominated by Slovak Americans, the majority of whom were Roman Catholic, during much of the 20th century.

The Lansingville neighborhood developed rapidly with the expansion of the city's south side in the late 19th century and early 20th century. The district's growth was made possible by the construction of the Market Street Bridge, which connected the south side to downtown Youngstown. Immigrants began to settle in the area during the late 19th century, and Lansingville was incorporated into Youngstown in three annexations between 1890 and 1929.

While the Lansingville neighborhood drew European immigrants of various backgrounds, including German Americans and Italian Americans, Slovak Americans became the dominant group in the early 20th century. One of the neighborhood's prominent landmarks is St. Matthias Church, which was established by Slovak immigrants who originally belonged to Sts. Cyril and Methodius Church, in the Smoky Hollow area of Youngstown.

Although this tradition is no longer intact, a custom of many Lansingville residents was to sweep their sidewalks and streets once a week. Today, Lansingville's population is ethnically diverse, although many Slovak-Americans still live there.

== Prominent residents ==
- Kelly Pavlik
- Ray Mancini
- Ed Muransky
