= Fernando Montiel vs. Nonito Donaire =

Boxing match

Think Fast!
- Date: February 19, 2011
- Venue: Mandalay Bay Events Center, Las Vegas, Nevada, U.S.
- Title(s) on the line: WBC and WBO bantamweight titles

Tale of the tape
Boxer	Fernando Montiel	Nonito Donaire
Nickname	"Cochulito"	"The Filipino Flash"
Hometown	Los Mochis, Sinaloa, Mexico	Talibon, Bohol, Philippines
Pre-fight record	44–2–2 (34 KO)	25–1 (17 KO)
Age	31 years, 11 months	28 years, 3 months
Height	5 ft 4 in (163 cm)	5 ft 6 in (168 cm)
Weight	118 lb (54 kg)	118 lb (54 kg)
Style	Orthodox	Orthodox
Recognition	WBC and WBO; Bantamweight Champion; The Ring; No. 1 Ranked Bantamweight; The Ring No. 7 ranked pound-for-pound fighter 3-division world champion	WBO; No. 3 Ranked Bantamweight; WBC; No. 4 Ranked Bantamweight; The Ring; No. 5 Ranked Bantamweight; The Ring No. 5 ranked pound-for-pound fighter Former flyweight champion

Result
- Donaire wins via 2nd–round TKO

Fernando Montiel vs. Nonito Donaire, billed as Think Fast!, was a professional boxing match contested on February 19, 2011, for the WBC and WBO bantamweight championship.

== Background ==
The bout pitted 2 fighters both on The Ring's Top 10 pound-for-pound list against each other.

== The fight ==
Donaire rocked Montiel with a left hook that sent the champion to the canvas. He was able to make it to his feet and allowed to continue, but after two more punches from Donaire, the referee stepped in and waved an end to the bout at 2:25 of Round 2. Donaire controlled most of the first round, landing a left hook that briefly stunned Montiel and came out swinging in the second round, landing a few combinations before stunning the champion with a solid hook that all but ended the fight.

== Aftermath ==
After his victory Donaire was promoted to 3rd in Ring Magazine's "pound for pound" rankings, behind only Juan Manuel Márquez and Sergio Martínez.

On February 28, resolutions moved by Pia Cayetano and Manuel Lapid were passed by the senate of the Philippines that Donaire be congratulated and commended for being an outstanding Filipino boxer and for bringing honor and pride to the country.

== Undercard ==
Confirmed bouts:

Winner	Loser	Weight division/title belt(s) disputed	Result
(United States) Mike Jones	(Mexico) Jesús Soto Karass	NABA, NABO, & WBC Continental Americas Welterweight titles	Unanimous decision
Preliminary bouts
(Philippines) Mark Melligen	(Mexico) Gabriel Martinez	Welterweight (10 rounds)	Unanimous decision
(United States) Mike Alvarado	(United Kingdom) Dean Harrison	Light Welterweight (8 rounds)	4th round RTD
(United States) Mickey Bey	(United States) Jose Hernandez	Lightweight (8 rounds)	Majority Draw
(Cuba) Yordenis Ugás	(United States) Carlos Musquez	Welterweight (6 rounds)	Unanimous decision
(Mexico) Rodrigo García	(United States) Gerald Jordan	Light Middleweight (4 rounds)	Unanimous decision
(United States) Ignacio Garcia	(United States) Armando Dorantes	Welterweight (4 rounds)	Majority decision

== Broadcasting ==
Country	Broadcaster
Hungary	Sport1
United States	HBO

Preceded by vs. Jovanny Soto	Fernando Montiel's bouts 19 February 2011	Succeeded by vs. Nehomar Cermeño
Preceded by vs. Volodymyr Sydorenko	Nonito Donaire's bouts 19 February 2011	Succeeded by vs. Omar Narváez
Awards
Preceded by Sergio Martínez vs. Paul Williams II	The Ring Knockout of the Year; 2011	Succeeded by Manny Pacquiao vs. Juan Manuel Márquez IV
