= Richard Williams (boxer) =

English boxer, born 1971

Personal information
- Nickname: The Secret
- Nationality: English
- Born: 9 May 1971 (age 55) England
- Height: 5 ft 9 in (175 cm)
- Weight: light middle/middle/super middleweight

Boxing career
- Reach: 72 in (183 cm)
- Stance: Orthodox

Boxing record
- Total fights: 27
- Wins: 21 (KO 17)
- Losses: 5 (KO 3)
- Draws: 1

Richard "The Secret" Williams (born 9 May 1971) is an English professional light middle/middle/super middleweight boxer of the 1990s, 2000s and 2010s who won the International Boxing Organization (IBO) light middleweight title, and Commonwealth light middleweight title (twice), and was a challenger for the International Boxing Organization (IBO) light middleweight title against Sergio Gabriel Martínez, and British Boxing Board of Control (BBBofC) British middleweight title against Howard Eastman, his professional fighting weight varied from 149 3/4 lb (67.9 kg; 10 st 9.8 lb), i.e. light middleweight to 162 1/4 lb (73.6 kg; 11 st 8.3 lb), i.e. super middleweight. Richard Williams is trained by Brian Lawrence, and managed by Barry Hearn, and John Rooney.

== Professional boxing record ==
27 fights	21 wins	5 losses
By knockout	17	3
By decision	4	2
Draws	1	

No.	Result	Record	Opponent	Type	Round, time	Date	Location	Notes
27	Loss	21–5–1	Virgilijus Stapulionis	TKO	1 (4), 2:24	2 Jun 2012	ExCeL Arena, Dockland, England	
26	Loss	21–4–1	Howard Eastman	KO	12 (12), 2:06	15 Dec 2006	York Hall, Bethnal Green, England	For vacant British middleweight title
25	Win	21–3–1	Vedran Akrap	TKO	5 (8), 2:54	22 Sep 2006	York Hall, Bethnal Green, England	
24	Win	20–3–1	Marcin Piatkowski	PTS	8	24 Feb 2006	Goresbrook Leisure Centre, Dagenham, England	
23	Win	19–3–1	Szabolcs Rimovszky	TKO	3 (6), 2:24	26 Nov 2004	Altrincham Leisure Centre, Altrincham, England	
22	Loss	18–3–1	Sergio Martínez	TKO	9 (12), 1:25	17 Apr 2004	King's Hall, Belfast, Northern Ireland	For IBO super welterweight title
21	Win	18–2–1	Ayitey Powers	TKO	7 (12), 2:54	31 Jan 2004	York Hall, Bethnal Green, England	Won vacant Commonwealth super welterweight title
20	Loss	17–2–1	Sergio Martínez	UD	12	21 Jun 2003	M.E.N. Arena, Manchester, England	Lost IBO super welterweight title
19	Win	17–1–1	Andrey Pestryayev	UD	12	8 Mar 2003	York Hall, Bethnal Green, England	Retained IBO super welterweight title; Won WBF (Federation) super welterweight title
18	Win	16–1–1	Paul Samuels	TKO	10 (12), 2:59	7 Dec 2002	Brentwood Centre, Brentwood, England	Retained IBO super welterweight title
17	Draw	15–1–1	Paul Samuels	TD	3 (12), 2:43	29 Jun 2002	Brentwood Centre, Brentwood, England	Retained IBO super welterweight title
16	Win	15–1	Shannan Taylor	TKO	4 (12), 2:17	1 Dec 2001	York Hall, Bethnal Green, England	Retained Commonwealth super welterweight title; Won vacant IBO super welterweight title
15	Win	14–1	Viktor Fesechko	TKO	6 (6), 0:39	20 Oct 2001	Mountbatten Centre, Portsmouth, England	
14	Win	13–1	Andrew Murray	TKO	3 (12), 2:21	25 Sep 2001	Everton Park Sports Centre, Liverpool, England	Retained Commonwealth super welterweight title
13	Win	12–1	Hussain Osman	PTS	10	4 Jun 2001	Hartlepool Borough Hall, Hartlepool, England	
12	Win	11–1	Tony Badea	TKO	3 (12), 0:47	23 Jan 2001	Crawley Leisure Centre, Crawley, England	Won Commonwealth super welterweight title
11	Win	10–1	Aziz Daari	TKO	2 (6)	2 Dec 2000	York Hall, Bethnal Green, England	
10	Win	9–1	Howard Clarke	KO	4 (10)	4 Nov 2000	York Hall, Bethnal Green, England	
9	Win	8–1	Dean Ashton	TKO	1 (4)	8 Sep 2000	Novotel Hotel, Hammersmith, England	
8	Win	7–1	Piotr Bartnicki	TKO	3 (6)	16 Jun 2000	Royal National Hotel, Bloomsbury, England	
7	Win	6–1	Kevin Thompson	KO	1 (4)	17 Apr 2000	Aston Villa Leisure Centre, Birmingham, England	
6	Win	5–1	Harry Butler	TKO	1 (4), 1:50	20 Dec 1999	York Hall, Bethnal Green, England	
5	Win	4–1	Lee Bird	TKO	3 (4), 0:52	6 Nov 1999	York Hall, Bethnal Green, England	
4	Win	3–1	Pedro Carragher	TKO	2 (4), 0:53	16 Oct 1999	York Hall, Bethnal Green, England	
3	Loss	2–1	Michael Alexander	PTS	4	2 Sep 1997	Elephant & Castle Centre, Southwark, England	
2	Win	2–0	Danny Quacoe	PTS	4	30 Jun 1997	York Hall, Bethnal Green, England	
1	Win	1–0	Marty Duke	TKO	3 (6), 1:10	8 Mar 1997	Brentwood Centre, Brentwood, England	
