= Sergio Martínez (boxer) =

Argentine boxer (born 1975)

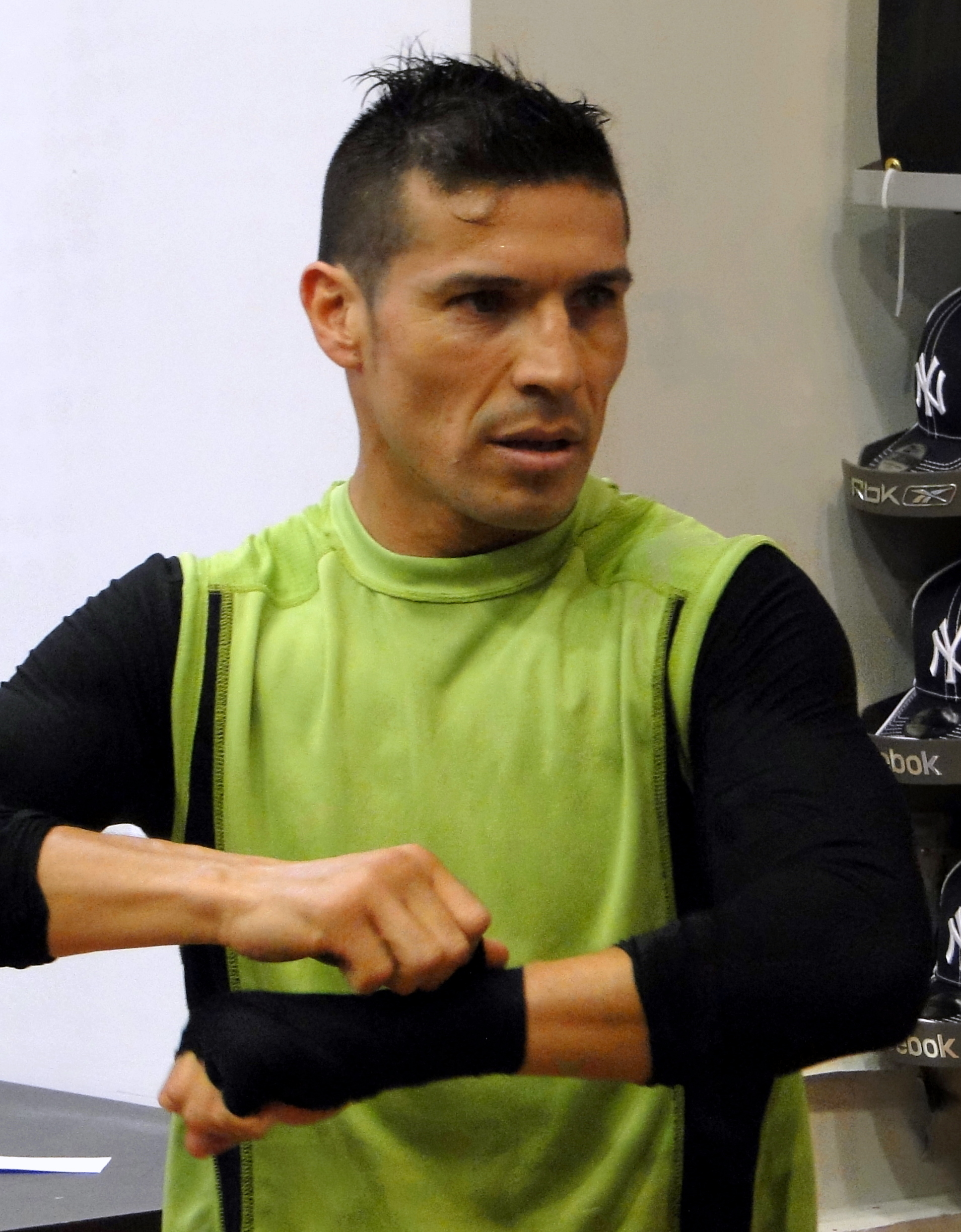
- Martínez in 2011

Personal information
- Nickname: Maravilla ("Marvel")
- Born: Sergio Gabriel Martínez; 21 February 1975 (age 51) Avellaneda, Buenos Aires, Argentina
- Height: 5 ft 10 in (178 cm)
- Weight: Welterweight; Light middleweight; Middleweight

Boxing career
- Reach: 73 in (185 cm)
- Stance: Southpaw

Boxing record
- Total fights: 62
- Wins: 57
- Win by KO: 32
- Losses: 3
- Draws: 2

Sergio Gabriel Martínez (born 21 February 1975) is an Argentine professional boxer. He has held world championships in two weight classes, including the WBC super welterweight title from 2009 to 2010; and the unified WBC, WBO, Ring magazine and lineal middleweight titles between 2010 and 2014. With six successful defenses of The Ring and lineal middleweight titles, Martínez's 50-month reign as champion ranks as one of the longest in the history of that weight class.

In 2010 he received Fighter of the Year awards by both The Ring and the Boxing Writers Association of America, as well as The Ring's Knockout of the Year for his rematch victory against Paul Williams. The WBC named him their Boxer of the Year in 2010 and 2012. Between 2010 and 2013, Martínez was generally ranked as the world's third best active boxer, pound for pound, behind Manny Pacquiao and Floyd Mayweather Jr., peaking his higher rank in March - May 2011 as No. 2 pound for pound boxer, as voted by most sporting News and boxing publicaciones like The Ring, Espn and Yahoo! Sports. In 2020 he was granted the Platinum Konex Award as the best boxer of the last decade in Argentina. A southpaw renowned for his work ethic, Martínez was known as a fast and athletic fighter and his style has been described as "crowd-pleasing", partly because of his tendency to fight with his hands down when out of his opponents' range.

Outside the ring, Martínez has been an active spokesperson in the fight against bullying and domestic violence against women. He is the author of a book, Corazón de Rey ("Heart of a King"), and is said to be working on a second book.

== Early life ==
Sergio Martínez was born on 21 February 1975 in Avellaneda to parents Hugo Alberto Martínez and Susana Griselda. Shortly afterwards the family relocated to the nearby city of Quilmes, which is also in the Buenos Aires Province. His father worked as a construction worker and metal worker, a trade which Sergio Martínez joined along with his two brothers, Sebastian and Hugo Jr. Martínez was bullied as a child in his "dirt-poor rural village." Before boxing, Martínez was a competitive cyclist and football player and it was not until 1995 that he decided he would become a boxer. After being trained by his uncle, Ruben Paniagua, Martínez began boxing as an amateur and compiled a record of 39–2 (39 wins to 2 losses), the losses came by way of majority decision and knockout. His boxing career suffered a major setback in August 1996 when he broke his left hand, forcing him out of the sport for a year. Although he considered competing for Argentina at the 2000 Olympics, he decided that he was too old to wait the two and a half years and chose to turn professional in December 1997.

== Professional career ==
=== Early years in Argentina ===
Martínez at the age of 22, had his first professional fight on 27 December 1997 in Ituzaingo, Buenos Aires, Argentina. The opponent for his professional debut, Cristian Marcelo Vivas, was disqualified in the second round, giving Martínez his first win. Martínez fought the first 17 fights of his career in his native Argentina, compiling a record of 16–0–1. The only blemish on his record at this point occurred in his third fight, a draw against Mario Javier Nieva over four rounds. Martínez rematched Nieva four months later and won a six-round unanimous decision.

After facing a relatively low level of opposition for his first 17 fights in Argentina, Martínez fought abroad for the first time, travelling to the United States to face Antonio Margarito on the undercard to the first Erik Morales vs Marco Antonio Barrera bout. The fight took place on 19 February 2000 at the Mandalay Bay in Las Vegas. The contest started badly for Martínez as Margarito scored a knockdown in the first round. Although Martínez recovered and had some success in the early rounds, he was hurt by a number of punches in round seven leading to a stoppage by the referee, thus handing Martínez his first loss. Following the Margarito fight, Martínez returned to Argentina and fought eight times, all victories, from April 2000 – February 2002. During this run of fights he won the Argentina welterweight title after outpointing Javier Alejandro Blanco. He successfully defended the title once, knocking out Sergio Ernesto Acuna in the seventh round, before being stripped of the title.

=== Relocation to Spain ===
After his final fight in Argentina, a February 2002 win over Francisco Mora, Martínez decided to relocate to Spain. It was there that he began his partnership with his current trainer Gabriel Sarmiento, who worked out of a gym in Azuqueca de Henares. During his time in Spain, Martínez also worked jobs such as; nightclub bouncer, dishwasher, construction worker and did modelling jobs for Adidas and Nike. From April 2002 – May 2003 he fought four times in Spain, all eight-round fights that he won against weak opposition, two of his opponents had lost their last six fights. This was to change in his next fight however, as he took on Richard Williams in England for the lightly regarded IBO light middleweight title. Martínez, who entered the ring as an underdog, having had only eight days preparation, won a unanimous decision. Although Williams scored knockdowns in the second and eleventh rounds, he was close to being stopped in the final round and the scorecards were heavily in Martínez's favour. He defended the IBO title twice in the United Kingdom; a twelfth round knock-out victory of Adrian Stone in Bristol was followed by a rematch against Williams in Belfast, on this occasion Williams was stopped in the ninth round. Over the next two and a half years, Martínez won seven fights in a row back in Spain, six of which were against boxers who had losing records. Soon thereafter, Martínez began to gain recognition and pursue fights in the United States, under the guidance of adviser Sampson Lewkowicz.

=== Light middleweight ===
==== Martínez vs. Cintron ====
Martínez claimed the Interim WBC light middleweight championship on 4 October 2008, beating Alex Bunema via an eighth round retirement. On 14 February 2009 Martínez fought to a majority draw against Puerto Rican Kermit Cintron. The fight was controversial for a number of reasons; during the seventh round Martínez knocked Cintron down with a clean left hand shot and the referee reached the count of ten and waved the fight off. However, this was disputed by Cintron, who claimed that the knockdown was a result of a headbutt but actually the headbutt which Cintron claimed to have happened was actually an extremely powerful and accurate cross from Sergio Martínez. Cintron's protestations led to the referee overturning his decision and the fight continued. The fight went the twelve round distance and the scorecards revealed a draw, many ringside observers felt that the decision was a robbery and that Martínez easily outboxed Cintron and should have gained the victory.

On 21 May 2009, WBC light middleweight champion Vernon Forrest was stripped of his title due to a rib injury that would leave him out of action indefinitely. Because of the injury and his inability to fight Sergio Martínez, Martínez's interim title was upgraded to full WBC title status. Although the organization also mandated that Martínez face Forrest, that bout would never happen. Less than a month later, Forrest was tragically murdered in Atlanta, GA.

=== Middleweight ===
==== Martínez vs. Williams I ====
On 5 December 2009 Martínez fought Paul Williams in a non-title middleweight bout at Atlantic City's Boardwalk Hall in a fight that was later described as a fight of the year candidate. In the first round Williams and Martínez would both knock each other down once. Martínez would then seem to control the next two rounds with effective power punching. Then Williams seemed to narrowly take control of the fight when he seemingly won rounds 4, 5, 6 and 7 by landing hard left hands to the side of Martínez's head. Rounds 8–10 then signified that the fight would be close on the score-cards when Martínez won those rounds by repeating what he did in rounds 2 and 3. Then in the final 2 rounds (11–12), both fighters began to fade although the exchanges remained very closely contested, although Williams was far more active and therefore would seemingly win those final 2 rounds based on the fact that he was far more active in the last 2 rounds of the fight. That would turn out to be the case as Williams would escape with a majority decision victory with scores of 114–114, 119–110 (for Williams) and 115–113 (for Williams).

==== Martínez vs. Pavlik ====
After an impressive performance against Paul Williams, Sergio Martínez stayed at middleweight and challenged WBC, WBO, The Ring and lineal middleweight champion Kelly Pavlik. The fight took place in Atlantic City's Boardwalk Hall on 17 April 2010. Martínez defeated Pavlik via unanimous decision in a bout which saw Martínez overcome a knockdown in the seventh round and go on to dominate a majority of the remaining rounds in the fight. Pavlik had cuts above both eyes for several rounds, which did not stop bleeding. He said they affected his vision and performance. Although there was a rematch clause in the contract, Pavlik chose not to enforce it, stating his desire to move up in weight. The victory over Pavlik earned Martínez the WBC, WBO, Ring and lineal middleweight championships.

With Martínez winning the middleweight championship, he was required to make some decisions regarding his conflicting WBC light middleweight title. The sanctioning organizations for boxing recognize that boxers may choose to move up or down in the weight categories, yet they also wish to make all championship belts available to challenge. As such, their rules prohibit a fighter from simultaneously holding belts in multiple divisions. This prohibition includes holding a title with one sanctioning organization while also holding a title in a different weight class with a different organization. Eight weeks after the Pavlik fight, when Martínez failed to announce a preference to be a light middleweight or a middleweight champion (the WBO rules allow ten days to decide), the WBO stripped him of their middleweight title. A week later, Martínez did inform the WBC that he was willing to vacate their Light Middleweight title and maintain his WBC Middleweight belt.

==== Martínez vs. Williams II ====
On 20 November 2010, Sergio got a chance to avenge his loss to Williams. Both fighters were ranked among the top six pound-for-pound fighters, and Williams came into the fight as the Ring No. 2 ranked Middleweight. Many speculated that this would be a fight of the year candidate. Approximately one minute into the second round, Martínez knocked Williams out with an over-the-top left hand to retain his title. The knockout was called by many as the knockout of the year. Williams stated to Max Kellerman after the fight, "He caught me with a punch I did not see."

==== Martínez vs. Dzinziruk ====
Sergio Martínez's next fight was against undefeated Sergiy Dzindziruk on 12 March 2011 at the Foxwoods Resort Casino, Mashantucket, winning by TKO in 8 rounds. Dzindziruk, the WBO light middlweight champion, was knocked down five times in the fight. Martinez was also awarded the WBC Diamond belt.

==== Martínez vs. Barker ====
Martínez then fought undefeated EBU middleweight champion Darren Barker on 1 October at the Boardwalk Hall in Atlantic City. He knocked Barker out with an extremely powerful right hook and put Barker to his knees in the 11th round.

Many boxing analysts and experts said that Darren Barker has the skills and ring generalship to one day become a champion, but that his skills were not perfected enough to do anything against Martínez. The first few rounds showed that Barker was actually able to make Martínez uncomfortable in the ring and give him more trouble than expected. Throughout the fight, Barker consistently gave Martínez problems, while never hurting him or really ever winning any of the rounds, he gave Martínez a challenge by coming in but not giving much offence to let Martínez counter or land anything clean. He also managed to get Martínez's nose to bleed early in the rounds by an upper-cut. Martínez, however, fought through the difficulty and eventually found openings which led to a knock-out of Barker, in the 11th with a right hook.

==== Martínez vs. Macklin ====
Sergio successfully defended his The Ring title against the No. 3 Ring Middleweight Matthew Macklin of Ireland on 17 March 2012 at the Madison Square Garden in New York City. Macklin was coming off a very impressive performance against middleweight champion Felix Sturm prior his fight with Martínez, a fight that many felt Macklin won, but he lost a controversial decision to Sturm in Germany. Macklin unexpectedly threw vigorous hooks and jabs that left Martínez behind on the scorecards and left Martínez in a sense of urgency. The Madison Square Garden crowd was largely pro-Macklin. The fight was featured on BBC's boxing schedule for 2011: "18: Madison Square Garden, New York City, Sergio Martinez beat Matthew Macklin by 11th-round KO (The Ring middleweight). ".

Martínez struggled in the first half of the fight, with Macklin able to time Martínez very well, which neutralized much of Sergio's offensive attack (and would even score a knock-down on Martínez in the seventh round). Martínez was able to turn the tide in the later rounds, finding his range with his left hand. After scoring two knockdowns in the 11th, Macklin's corner stopped the fight shortly before the 12th round.

==== Martínez vs. Chávez Jr. ====
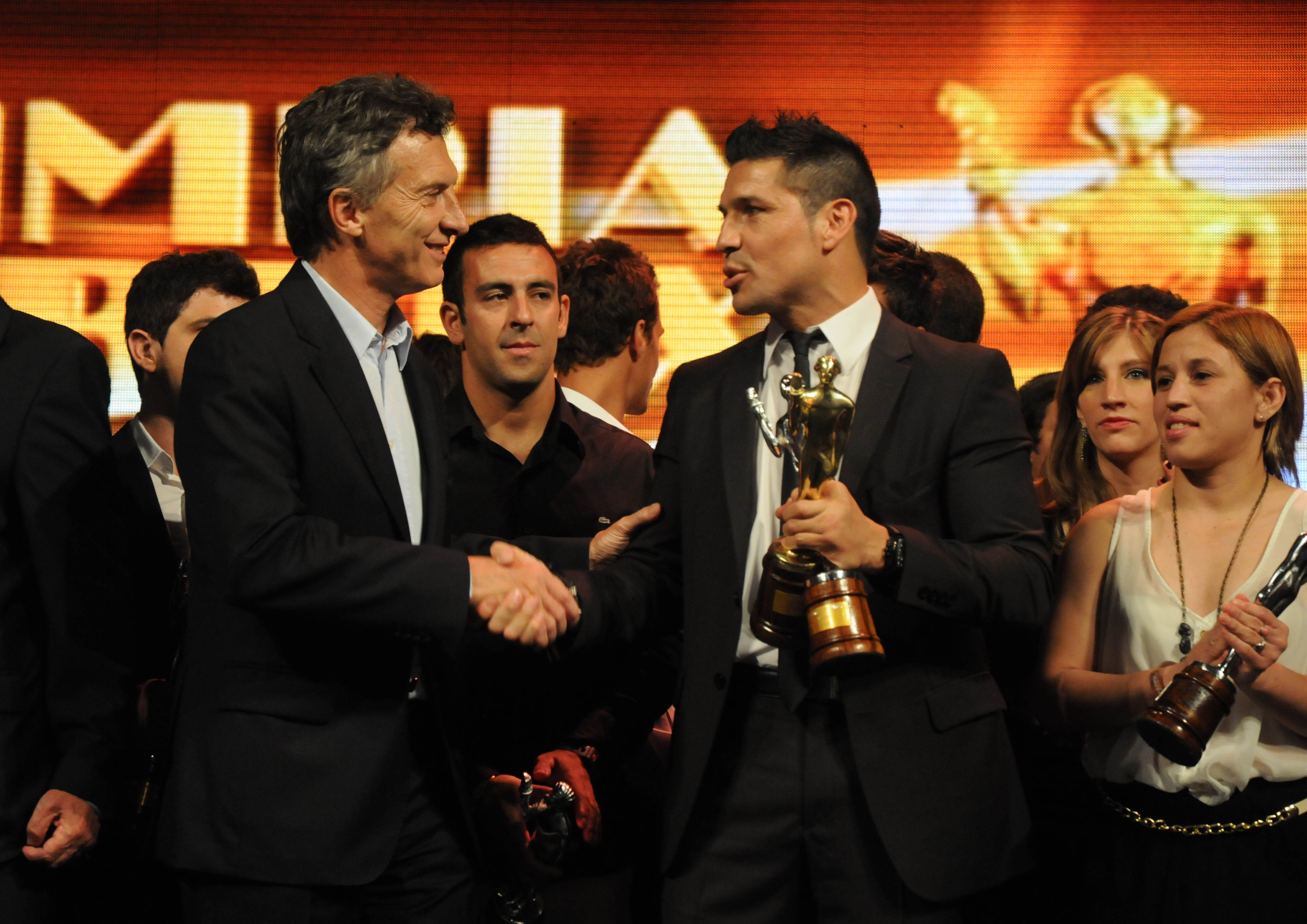
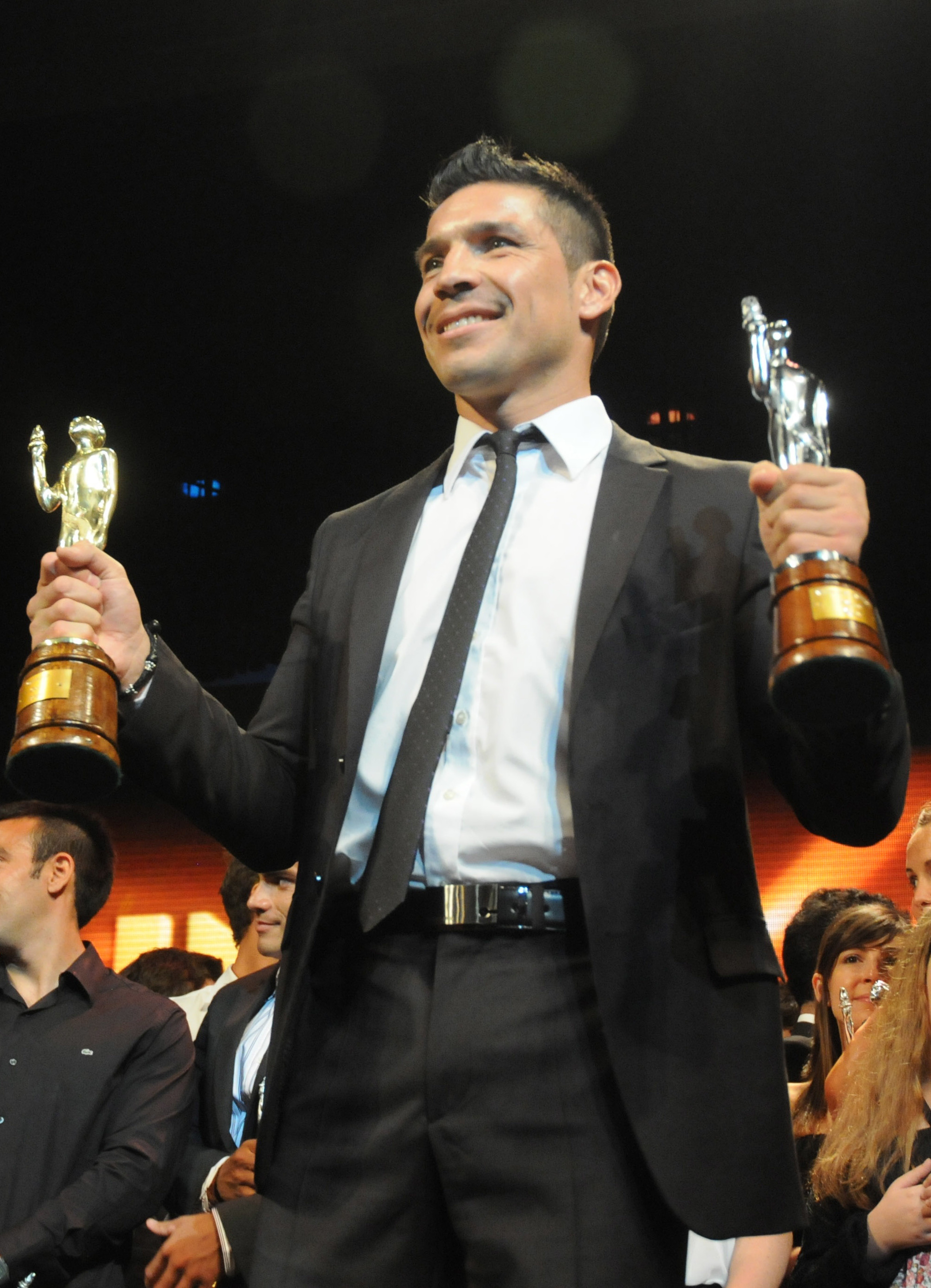
Martínez being awarded the Olimpia de Oro for 2012

This fight was notable in that the WBC did not initially want Chávez Jr. to fight Martinez. Chávez Jr.'s godfather was the head of WBC and refused to allow the fight, even after a unanimous vote to allow the unbeaten champion to fight the current title holder.

Martinez prepped for this fight against Chavez Jr. in Oxnard, California training under his career long coach, Gabriel Sarmiento. Martínez fought Julio César Chávez Jr. on 15 September 2012, at the Thomas & Mack Center in Paradise, Nevada for Chávez Jr.'s WBC Middleweight title. Martínez won by unanimous decision after surviving a 12th round knock down following a dominant performance over the first 11 rounds. ESPN, and The Los Angeles Times all gave round-by-round reports on the fight.

Martínez out worked and out landed Chávez throughout the first 11 rounds of the fight, in dominating fashion. Though Chávez had his moments trapping Martínez in the corner on the ropes, Martínez fought Chávez and used his fast lateral movement to avoid and neutralize Chávez' offensive attack. Chávez hurt Martinez in the 12th round, sending him to the canvas halfway through the round. Martínez got up with a little over one minute left in the fight, and rather than clinch or hold on to Chávez, Martínez continued to throw and trade blows with the Mexican. Despite being fatigued and clearly hurt, Sergio Martínez managed to survive the thrilling 12th round without holding. Martínez won the fight by unanimous decision, by the scores of 117–110, 118–109, and 118–109. After the fight, it was revealed that Martínez had broken his left hand (as early as the 4th round) and torn his right meniscus, the latter of which would require surgery.

After the fight, Chávez tested positive for cannabis. As a result, he received a fine of $20,000 and was indefinitely suspended by the World Boxing Council.

==== Martínez vs. Murray ====
After his surgery, Martínez confirmed his next title defense would take place in his native Argentina, in what would be his first fight in his home country since leaving for Spain in 2002. News agency Reuters reported that Martínez could make his first title defense against British fighter Martin Murray on 27 April 2013 in Argentina. Martínez defeated Ring Top 10 Middleweight Martin Murray by a controversial unanimous decision. Many observers stated that there had been a clear deterioration in Martínez since the Chávez Jr. bout.

==== Martínez vs. Cotto ====
After a series of setbacks including further surgeries on his knees, Martínez fought again over a year after the Murray fight, losing his WBC, The Ring and lineal middleweight titles to three-division former world champion Miguel Cotto on 7 June 2014, at Madison Square Garden in New York City. It was evident straight away that Martinez's legs were not there, even with knee braces on and clearly visible, Cotto knocked Martínez down three times in the first round. After the first round however, he began to make the fight competitive with Cotto. He continued to fight back until round nine when Martínez went down once again. Following the ninth round, trainer Pablo Sarmiento decided to call off the fight prior to the tenth round while still in the corner, against the urging of Martínez. According to reports, Sarmiento told Martínez "Champion, your knees are not responding. Sergio, look at me ... I'm gonna stop this one. Sergio, you are the best for me. You'll always be the best champion, Sergio."

Following the bout, Martínez stated that he wanted to continue his boxing career, and expressed his desire to fight against Manny Pacquiao and Floyd Mayweather Jr. However, on 13 June 2015, Martínez announced his retirement from boxing at the age of 40, stating that both aging and knee injuries were the causes for his decision. Since 2020, Martinez has had a succession of comeback fights and was ranked in the top 10 when aged 47.

== Personal life ==
Martinez still resides in Madrid, Spain. He is divorced and once dated sports commentator Silvana Carsetti.

=== Activism ===
Martinez has been presented with an award for helping bullied children. He has also championed the cause of stopping domestic violence against women. He attended a news conference to support legislation involving the Violence Against Women Act. Martinez was quoted as saying: "With domestic violence, no one wanted to touch the subject with a 10-foot pole. I was interested in the issue that a boxer, who dishes out violence, could also be thoughtful and do something and people would listen to someone like me. I thought I could have the most impact by speaking out on the issue."

== Professional boxing record ==
62 fights	57 wins	3 losses
By knockout	32	2
By decision	24	1
By disqualification	1	0
Draws	2	

No.	Result	Record	Opponent	Type	Round, time	Date	Age	Location	Notes
62	Win	57–3–2	Jhon Teherán	KO	1 (12), 1:27	21 Mar 2023	48 years, 28 days	Estadio Luna Park, Ciudad de Buenos Aires, Argentina	
61	Win	56–3–2	Noah Kidd	KO	2 (8), 2:35	11 Dec 2022	47 years, 293 days	Caribe Royale Orlando, Orlando, Florida, US	
60	Win	55–3–2	McCauley McGowan	UD	10	27 Jan 2022	46 years, 340 days	WiZink Center, Madrid, Spain	
59	Win	54–3–2	Brian Rose	UD	10	25 Sep 2021	46 years, 216 days	Valdemoro, Madrid, Spain	
58	Win	53–3–2	Jussi Koivula	TKO	9 (10), 0:36	19 Dec 2020	45 years, 302 days	Bolera Severino Prieto, Torrelavega, Spain	
57	Win	52–3–2	Jose Miguel Fandiño	TKO	7 (10), 1:51	21 Aug 2020	45 years, 182 days	El Malecon, Torrelavega, Spain	
56	Loss	51–3–2	Miguel Cotto	RTD	10 (12), 0:06	7 Jun 2014	39 years, 106 days	Madison Square Garden, New York City, New York, U.S.	Lost WBC and The Ring middleweight titles
55	Win	51–2–2	Martin Murray	UD	12	27 Apr 2013	38 years, 65 days	José Amalfitani Stadium, Buenos Aires, Argentina	Retained WBC and The Ring middleweight titles
54	Win	50–2–2	Julio César Chávez Jr.	UD	12	15 Sep 2012	37 years, 207 days	Thomas & Mack Center, Paradise, Nevada, U.S.	Retained The Ring middleweight title; Won WBC middleweight title
53	Win	49–2–2	Matthew Macklin	RTD	11 (12), 3:00	17 Mar 2012	37 years, 25 days	The Theater at Madison Square Garden, New York City, New York, U.S.	Retained The Ring middleweight title
52	Win	48–2–2	Darren Barker	KO	11 (12), 1:29	1 Oct 2011	36 years, 222 days	Boardwalk Hall, Atlantic City, New Jersey, U.S.	Retained The Ring middleweight title
51	Win	47–2–2	Serhiy Dzyndzyruk	TKO	8 (12), 1:43	12 Mar 2011	36 years, 19 days	Foxwoods Resort Casino, Ledyard, Connecticut, U.S.	Retained The Ring middleweight title
50	Win	46–2–2	Paul Williams	KO	2 (12), 1:10	20 Nov 2010	35 years, 272 days	Boardwalk Hall, Atlantic City, New Jersey, U.S.	Retained WBC and The Ring middleweight titles
49	Win	45–2–2	Kelly Pavlik	UD	12	17 Apr 2010	35 years, 55 days	Boardwalk Hall, Atlantic City, New Jersey, U.S.	Won WBC, WBO, and The Ring middleweight titles
48	Loss	44–2–2	Paul Williams	MD	12	5 Dec 2009	34 years, 287 days	Boardwalk Hall, Atlantic City, New Jersey, U.S.	
47	Draw	44–1–2	Kermit Cintrón	MD	12	14 Feb 2009	33 years, 359 days	BankAtlantic Center, Sunrise, Florida, U.S.	Retained WBC interim super welterweight title
46	Win	44–1–1	Alex Bunema	RTD	8 (12), 3:00	4 Oct 2008	33 years, 226 days	Pechanga Resort & Casino, Temecula, California, U.S.	Won vacant WBC interim super welterweight title
45	Win	43–1–1	Archak TerMeliksetian	TKO	7 (10), 2:14	7 Jun 2008	33 years, 107 days	Mohegan Sun Arena, Montville, Connecticut, U.S.	
44	Win	42–1–1	David Toribio	UD	4	16 Feb 2008	32 years, 360 days	MGM Grand Garden Arena, Paradise, Nevada, U.S.	
43	Win	41–1–1	Russell Jordan	TKO	4 (10), 0:59	6 Dec 2007	32 years, 288 days	Paradise Theater, New York City, New York, U.S.	
42	Win	40–1–1	Pavel Florin Madalin	RTD	4 (6), 3:00	6 Oct 2007	32 years, 227 days	Polideportivo Sage 2000, Madrid, Spain	
41	Win	39–1–1	Saúl Román	KO	4 (12), 2:25	27 Apr 2007	32 years, 65 days	Grand Plaza Hotel, Houston, Texas, U.S.	
40	Win	38–1–1	Oliver Tchinda	KO	5 (8)	7 Oct 2006	31 years, 228 days	Pabellón La Solidaridad, Fuenlabrada, Spain	
39	Win	37–1–1	Vasile Surcica	UD	12	26 May 2006	31 years, 94 days	Poliesportiu Insular Blanca Dona, Ibiza	Retained WBC Latino super welterweight title
38	Win	36–1–1	Presente Brito	TKO	1 (8)	1 Apr 2006	31 years, 39 days	Estadio Rayo Vallecano, Madrid, Spain	
37	Win	35–1–1	Tamaz Tskrialashvili	RTD	6 (8)	4 Nov 2005	30 years, 256 days	La Cubierta, Leganés, Spain	
36	Win	34–1–1	Alvaro Moreno Gamboa	KO	2 (12)	5 Oct 2005	30 years, 226 days	La Línea de la Concepción, Spain	Retained WBC Latino super welterweight title
35	Win	33–1–1	Albert Airapetian	KO	11 (12)	4 Mar 2005	30 years, 11 days	León, Spain	Won WBC Latino super welterweight title
34	Win	32–1–1	Jorge Teixeira Pina	TKO	5 (8), 0:23	7 Jan 2005	Pabellón Municipal, Lugo, Spain		
33	Win	31–1–1	Richard Williams	RTD	9 (12)	17 Apr 2004	29 years, 56 days	King's Hall, Belfast, Northern Ireland	Retained IBO super welterweight title
32	Win	30–1–1	Adrian Stone	KO	12 (12), 1:50	9 Oct 2003	28 years, 230 days	Whitchurch Leisure Centre, Bristol, England	Retained IBO super welterweight title
31	Win	29–1–1	Richard Williams	UD	12	21 Jun 2003	28 years, 120 days	MEN Arena, Manchester, England	Won IBO super welterweight title
30	Win	28–1–1	Frank Oppong	UD	8	9 May 2003	28 years, 77 days	La Cubierta Palazo de Toros, Leganés, Spain	
29	Win	27–1–1	Miguel Angel Perez	KO	1 (8)	7 Feb 2003	27 years, 351 days	Cubierta de Leganes, Madrid, Spain	
28	Win	26–1–1	Vasile Surcica	UD	8	12 Jul 2002	27 years, 141 days	Campo de Futbol Las Americas, Parla, Spain	
27	Win	25–1–1	Alvaro Moreno Gamboa	UD	8	26 Apr 2002	27 years, 64 days	Barcelona, Spain	
26	Win	24–1–1	Francisco Antonio Mora	UD	10	2 Feb 2002	26 years, 346 days	Estadio FAB, Buenos Aires, Argentina	
25	Win	23–1–1	Sergio Ernesto Acuna	TKO	7 (12), 1:47	27 Oct 2001	26 years, 248 days	Estadio FAB, Buenos Aires, Argentina	Retained ABF welterweight title
24	Win	22–1–1	Javier Alejandro Blanco	UD	10	8 Sep 2001	26 years, 199 days	Estadio FAB, Buenos Aires, Argentina	Won vacant ABF welterweight title
23	Win	21–1–1	Enrique Areco	RTD	8 (8), 0:01	14 Jul 2001	26 years, 143 days	Ce.De.M. N° 2, Caseros, Argentina	
22	Win	20–1–1	Elbio Felipe Gonzlaez	TKO	6 (10)	19 May 2001	26 years, 87 days	Nueve de Julio, Argentina	
21	Win	19–1–1	Adrian Walter Daneff	KO	4 (12)	16 Jun 2000	25 years, 116 days	Club Argentino de Quilmes, Quilmes, Argentina	Won vacant WBO Latino welterweight title
20	Win	18–1–1	Javier Alejandro Blanco	UD	8	5 May 2000	25 years, 74 days	Santa Rosa, Argentina	
19	Win	17–1–1	Raul Eduardo Bejarano	UD	6	15 Apr 2000	25 years, 54 days	Club Argentino de Quilmes, Quilmes, Argentina	
18	Loss	16–1–1	Antonio Margarito	TKO	7 (10), 2:57	19 Feb 2000	24 years, 363 days	Mandalay Bay Events Center, Paradise, Nevada, U.S.	
17	Win	16–0–1	Paulo Alejandro Sanchez	UD	10	22 Oct 1999	24 years, 243 days	Club Argentino de Quilmes, Quilmes, Argentina	
16	Win	15–0–1	Silvio Walter Rojas	UD	10	9 Oct 1999	24 years, 230 days	Círculo General Belgrano, Ciudad Evita, Argentina	
15	Win	14–0–1	Walter Fabian Saporiti	TKO	2 (8)	11 Sep 1999	24 years, 202 days	Club Argentino de Quilmes, Quilmes, Argentina	
14	Win	13–0–1	Ariel Gabriel Chaves	UD	10	28 Aug 1999	24 years, 188 days	Club Argentino de Quilmes, Quilmes, Argentina	
13	Win	12–0–1	Paulo Alejandro Sanchez	UD	10	17 Jul 1999	24 years, 146 days	Villa Dominico, Argentina	
12	Win	11–0–1	Silvio Walter Rojas	UD	10	26 Jun 1999	24 years, 125 days	Club Argentino de Quilmes, Quilmes, Argentina	
11	Win	10–0–1	Elio Vaca Anglarill	UD	8	15 May 1999	24 years, 83 days	Club Argentino de Quilmes, Quilmes, Argentina	
10	Win	9–0–1	Jose Antonio Perez	UD	8	17 Apr 1999	24 years, 55 days	Club Argentino de Quilmes, Quilmes, Argentina	
9	Win	8–0–1	Ignacio Ramon Caceres	RTD	4 (6)	19 Mar 1999	24 years, 26 days	Club Argentino de Quilmes, Quilmes, Argentina	
8	Win	7–0–1	Arnaldo Gabriel Molina	RTD	5 (6)	5 Mar 1999	24 years, 12 days	Mar del Plata, Argentina	
7	Win	6–0–1	Gabriel Leonidas Leiva	TKO	3 (8)	4 Dec 1998	23 years, 286 days	Estudios Canal 9, Buenos Aires, Argentina	
6	Win	5–0–1	Luis Alberto Baldomir	RTD	5 (6)	4 Sep 1998	23 years, 195 days	Estadio FAB, Buenos Aires, Argentina	
5	Win	4–0–1	Juan Mauricio Marino	UD	6	22 Aug 1998	23 years, 182 days	Estadio FAB, Buenos Aires, Argentina	
4	Win	3–0–1	Mario Javier Nieva	UD	6	25 Jul 1998	23 years, 154 days	Estadio FAB, Buenos Aires, Argentina	
3	Draw	2–0–1	Mario Javier Nieva	PTS	4	14 Mar 1998	23 years, 21 days	Estudios América TV, Buenos Aires, Argentina	
2	Win	2–0	Julio Cesar Villalva	TKO	1 (6)	20 Feb 1998	22 years, 364 days	Cipolletti, Argentina	
1	Win	1–0	Cristian Marcelo Vivas	DQ	2 (6)	27 Dec 1997	22 years, 309 days	Ituzaingó, Argentina	

== Titles in boxing ==
=== Major world titles ===
- WBC light middleweight champion (154 lbs)
- WBC middleweight champion (160 lbs) (2×)
- WBO middleweight champion (160 lbs)

=== The Ring magazine titles ===
- The Ring middleweight champion (160 lbs)

=== Interim world titles ===
- WBC interim light middleweight champion (154 lbs)

=== Minor world titles ===
- IBO light middleweight champion (154 lbs)

=== Regional/International titles ===
- WBO Latino welterweight champion (147 lbs)
- ABF welterweight champion (147 lbs)
- WBC Latino light middleweight champion (154 lbs)

=== Honorary titles ===
- WBC Emeritus Champion
- WBC Diamond middleweight champion

== Pay-per-view bouts ==
Date	Fight	Billing	Buys	Network
15 September 2012	Chávez Jr. vs. Martínez	Chavez Jr.-Martínez	475,000	HBO
7 June 2014	Cotto vs. Martínez	Cotto-Martínez	350,000	HBO

== Boxing Awards and honours ==
• Yahoo Sports Fight of the Year: 2009 (vs Paul Williams)

• The Ring magazine Fighter of the Year: 2010

• Sugar Ray Robinson Award / BWAA Fighter of the Year: 2010

• Sports Illustrated Fighter of the Year:2010

• Yahoo Sports Fighter of the Year: 2010

•PBF Fighter of the Year: 2010

• WBC Fighter of the Year: 2010, 2012

• The Ring magazine Knockout of the Year: 2010 (vs Paul Williams)

• The Ring magazine Round of the Year: 2012 (round 12 vs Julio César Chávez Jr.)

== See also ==
- List of world light-middleweight boxing champions
- List of world middleweight boxing champions

Sporting positions
Regional boxing titles
Vacant Title last held by Fabio Angel Vidal	WBO Latino welterweight champion 16 June 2000 – March 2001; Vacated	Vacant Title next held by Jose Joaquin Rosa Gomez
Vacant Title last held by Sergio Ernesto Acuna	ABF welterweight champion 8 September 2001 – July 2002; Stripped	Vacant Title next held by Raul Eduardo Bejarano
Vacant Title last held by Anderson Clayton	WBC Latino super welterweight champion 4 March 2005 – October 2006; Vacated	Vacant Title next held by Rafael Sosa Pintos
Minor world boxing titles
Preceded by Richard Williams	IBO super welterweight champion 21 June 2003 – January 2005; Vacated	Vacant Title next held by Mihály Kótai
Major world boxing titles
Vacant Title last held by Javier Castillejo	WBC super welterweight champion Interim title 4 October 2008 – 21 May 2009; Promoted to world champion	Vacant Title next held by Sebastian Fundora
Preceded by Vernon Forrest stripped	WBC super welterweight champion 21 May 2009 – 16 June 2010; Vacated	Vacant Title next held by Manny Pacquiao
Preceded by Kelly Pavlik	WBC middleweight champion 17 April 2010 – 18 January 2011; Status changed	Succeeded by Sebastian Zbik promoted from interim status
Preceded by Kelly Pavlik	WBO middleweight champion 17 April 2010– 1 June 2010; Stripped	Vacant Title next held by Dmitry Pirog
Preceded by Kelly Pavlik	The Ring middleweight champion 17 April 2010 – 7 June 2014	Succeeded by Miguel Cotto
Preceded by Julio César Chávez Jr.	WBC middleweight champion 15 September 2012 – 7 June 2014	Succeeded by Miguel Cotto
Awards
Previous: Manny Pacquiao	The Ring Fighter of the Year; 2010	Succeeded by Andre Ward
Previous: Manny Pacquiao	BWAA Fighter of the Year; 2010	Succeeded by Andre Ward
Previous: Manny Pacquiao; KO2 Ricky Hatton	The Ring Knockout of the Year; KO2 Paul Williams; 2010	Next: Nonito Donaire; KO2 Fernando Montiel
Previous: Lionel Messi	Olimpia Award; 2012	Next: Marcos Maidana
