= Tony Badea =

Romanian/Canadian boxer

Personal information
- Nickname: Bad Boy
- Nationality: Romanian, Canadian
- Born: 2 May 1974 (age 52) Romania
- Height: 5 ft 10 in (1.78 m)
- Weight: Welterweight; Light middleweight Middleweight; Super middleweight

Boxing career

Boxing record
- Total fights: 36
- Wins: 27 (KO 16)
- Losses: 7 (KO 5)
- Draws: 1
- No contests: 1

Tony "Bad Boy" Badea (born 2 May 1974) is a Romanian Canadian retired professional boxer.

== Career ==
Badea competed as welterweight, light middleweight, middleweight and super middleweight between the 1990s and 2000s. He won the Canada Welterweight title, Canada Light Middleweight title, International Boxing Organization (IBO) Inter-Continental light middleweight title, and Commonwealth Super Welterweight title, his professional fighting weight varied from 143 1/2 lb (65.1 kg; 10 st 3.5 lb), i.e. welterweight to 165 lb (75 kg; 11 st 11 lb), i.e. super middleweight.

== Personal life ==
Badea was born in Romania and immigrated to Edmonton, Alberta, when he was 16 years old. He is the son of Virgil Badea who was the light middleweight boxing Champion of Romania in 1961.

From 2002 until 2007, his career was interrupted because of his problems with alcoholism and drug use. In December 2007 he was found by a biker in a ditch, covered in snow, the biker announced the Gendarmery. The Gendarmery officer took Tony in the shelter for the poor across the road. Badea worked at the shelter's kitchen and followed a rehabilitation program.

After he ended his career with three last fights in 2008, he worked in a bakery where he met his wife Jody who gave birth to his daughter, Olivia.

== Championships and accomplishments ==
- Canadian Boxing Federation
  - CBF Super Welterweight Championship (One time)
- Commonwealth Boxing Council
  - Commonwealth Super Welterweight Championship (One time)
- International Boxing Organization
  - IBO Inter-Continental Super Welterweight Championship (One time)

== Professional boxing record ==
36 fights	27 wins	7 losses
By knockout	16	5
By decision	10	2
By disqualification	1	0
Draws	1	
No contests	1	

No.	Result	Record	Opponent	Method	Round, time	Date	Location	Notes
36	Loss	27–7–1 (1)	(Canada) Kris Andrews	TKO	1 (6), 1:59	June 20, 2008	(Canada) Shaw Conference Centre, Edmonton, Alberta	
35	Win	27–6–1 (1)	(Canada) Claudio Ortiz	DQ	5 (6), 2:05	May 16, 2008	(Canada) Italian Cultural Centre, Edmonton, Alberta	
34	Win	26–6–1 (1)	(Canada) Justin Berger	TKO	2 (6), 1:15	Mar 28, 2008	(Canada) Shaw Conference Centre, Edmonton, Alberta	
33	Loss	25–6–1 (1)	(United States) Verno Phillips	TKO	4 (10), 3:00	July 19, 2002	(United States) Yakama Legends Casino, Toppenish, Washington	
32	Loss	25–5–1 (1)	(United States) Darrell Woods	TKO	7 (10), 2:29	May 31, 2002	(United States) Chinook Winds Casino, Lincoln City, Oregon	
31	Win	25–4–1 (1)	(Guyana) Wayne Harris	UD	8	Sep 20, 2001	(Canada) Edmonton, Alberta	
30	Loss	24–4–1 (1)	(United Kingdom) Richard Williams	TKO	3 (12), 0:47	Jan 23, 2001	(United Kingdom) Leisure Centre, West Sussex Crawley	Lost Commonwealth Super Welterweight Title
29	Win	24–3–1 (1)	(Mexico) Gilberto Flores	UD	10	Nov 17, 2000	Sala Sporturilor Olympia, Ploiești, Romania	
28	Loss	23–3–1 (1)	(Colombia) Juan Carlos Candelo	UD	10	June 9, 2000	(United States) Turning Stone Resort & Casino, Verona, New York	
27	Win	23–2–1 (1)	(Argentina) Paulo Alejandro Sanchez	SD	10	April 6, 2000	Air Canada Centre, Toronto, Ontario	
26	Win	22–2–1 (1)	(Australia) Gavin Topp	UD	12	Nov 19, 1999	(Canada) Shaw Conference Centre, Edmonton, Alberta	Retained Commonwealth Super Welterweight Title
25	Win	21–2–1 (1)	(United States) Mario L'Esperance	TKO	6 (8)	Aug 12, 1999	(Canada) Slave Lake, Alberta	
24	Win	20–2–1 (1)	(Spain) Manny Sobral	KO	6 (12)	June 24, 1999	(Canada) Edmonton, Alberta	Retained CBF Super Welterweight Title; Won Commonwealth Super Welterweight Title
23	Win	19–2–1 (1)	(Jamaica) Greg Johnson	RTD	5 (12), 3:00	Feb 23, 1999	(Canada) Edmonton, Alberta	Won Vacant CBF Super Welterweight Title
22	Win	18–2–1 (1)	(United States) Aaron McLaurine	UD	10	April 21, 1998	(Canada) Edmonton, Alberta	
21	Win	17–2–1 (1)	(Jamaica) Greg Johnson	TKO	3	Feb 13, 1998	(Canada) Edmonton, Alberta	
20	Loss	16–2–1 (1)	(Spain) Manny Sobral	TD	11 (12)	June 12, 1997	(Canada) Edmonton, Alberta	For CBF Super Welterweight Title
19	Win	16–1–1 (1)	(United States) Anthony Ivory	UD	12	Mar 27, 1997	(Canada) Convention Centre, Edmonton, Alberta	Won IBO Inter-Continental Super Welterweight Title
18	Win	15–1–1 (1)	(United States) James Stokes	TKO	2 (8), 1:48	Feb 13, 1997	(United States) The Aladdin, Las Vegas, Nevada	
17	Win	14–1–1 (1)	(United States) Jeff Johnson	UD	8	Dec 15, 1996	(Canada) Edmonton, Alberta	
16	Win	13–1–1 (1)	(United States) Derrick Coleman	TKO	10	Oct 7, 1996	(Canada) Edmonton, Alberta	
15	Draw	12–1–1 (1)	(United States) Derrick Coleman	PTS	8	Aug 29, 1996	(Canada) International Plaza Hotel, Toronto, Ontario	
14	Loss	12–1 (1)	(Trinidad and Tobago) Fitz Vanderpool	TKO	6 (12)	April 19, 1996	(Canada) Argicom Edmonton, Alberta	For CBF Welterweight Title
13	Win	12–0 (1)	(Canada) Bryon Mackie	UD	10	Jan 25, 1996	(Canada) Edmonton, Alberta	
12	Win	11–0 (1)	(Guam) Phil Clarson	TKO	3	Dec 7, 1995	(Canada) Fort McMurray, Alberta	
11	Win	10–0 (1)	(United States) Dezi Ford	UD	10	Oct 25, 1995	(Canada) Mayfield Inn, Edmonton, Alberta	
10	Win	9–0 (1)	(Canada) Alan Harper	TKO	9 (10), 1:22	Aug 14, 1995	(Canada) Italian Cultural Centre, Edmonton, Alberta	
9	Win	8–0 (1)	(United States) Darrell Cottrell	TKO	6 (10), 1:36	June 27, 1995	(Canada) Convention Centre, Edmonton, Alberta	
8	Win	7–0 (1)	(Canada) Ron Pasek	UD	6	April 28, 1995	(Canada) Convention Centre, Edmonton, Alberta	
7	NC	6–0 (1)	(Canada) Tracy Anderson	ND	2	Mar 31, 1995	(Canada) Burnaby, British Columbia	
6	Win	6–0	(Canada) Brian Ramsden	TKO	2 (6)	Feb 24, 1995	(Canada) Convention Centre, Edmonton, Alberta	
5	Win	5–0	(Canada) Chris Coleman	TKO	5 (6)	Jan 26, 1995	(Canada) Italian Cultural Centre, Edmonton, Alberta	
4	Win	4–0	(Canada) Rob Stowell	TKO	3 (6)	Dec 9, 1994	(Canada) Convention Centre, Edmonton, Alberta	
3	Win	3–0	(Canada) Terry Fowler	TKO	4 (6), 1:19	Oct 21, 1994	(Canada) Convention Centre, Winnipeg, Manitoba	
2	Win	2–0	(Canada) Darren Kenny	KO	3 (6)	Sep 15, 1994	(Canada) Convention Centre, Edmonton, Alberta	
1	Win	1–0	(Canada) Mike Kennedy	TKO	4 (6)	Mar 22, 1994	(Canada) Convention Centre, Edmonton, Alberta	Professional debut
