= Jean-Baptiste Badeaux =

Jean-Baptiste Badeaux (French pronunciation: [ʒɑ̃ batistə bado]; 29 April 1741, in Quebec – 12 November 1796, in Trois-Rivières, Quebec) was a Canadian official who served as notary for the province of Quebec.

Born in Quebec, Badeaux was the ninth of ten children, By age 13, his family was living with an aunt in Trois-Rivières. On 29 October 1764, Badeaux married Marguerite Bolvin, the daughter of wood-carver Gilles Bolvin. They had two sons, one of whom, Joseph Badeaux, also became a notary.

In 1767, Badeaux received a commission as a notary for the Trois-Rivières area. He soon gained a strong reputation for the quality of his work. During the American Revolution, Badeaux remained loyal to the British crown. He recruited men for the local militia and worked to combat sympathy for the American colonies. When an American army approached Trois-Rivières in 1775, Badeaux was dispatched to meet their commander, Major General Richard Montgomery. Badeaux successfully negotiated for the safety of the town and its residents.

In 1781, in appreciation for his loyalty during the war, the British government appointed Badeaux as a notary for the entire province. Badeaux represented many Quebeckers in unsuccessful negotiations with the U.S. Government for supplies that were requisitioned by the American army during its occupation.

In July 1790, Badeaux was appointed justice of the peace for the District of Trois-Rivières. In 1795, he prepared the land roll for land being claimed by the Abenaki First Nation people of Saint-François, Quebec. Badeaux also represented the Ursuline religious order from Trois-Rivières in dealings with the provincial government in Quebec City.

On 10 January, 1791, Badeaux married Marguerite Pratte.

Badeaux died on 12 November 1796 in Trois-Rivières after a long illness.
