= Miguel Espino =

American boxer (born 1980)

Miguel Espino
Profile
Born	February 16, 1980 (age 45)
Birthplace	N. Hollywood, U.S.
Nationality	Mexican-American
Residence	N. Hollywood, U.S.
Height	5 ft 11 in (1.80 m)
Classification	Middleweight
Boxing Record
Fights	20
Wins (KOs)	16 (8)
Losses	3
Draws	1
Results on The Contender
First Round	Lost to Manfredo on points

Miguel Angel Espino (born February 16, 1980) is a professional American boxer.

== Personal life ==
Espino, a Mexican-American, was born in North Hollywood, California. Espino is from the "hood", and sees boxing as an escape from this - looking to the day when he can present his family the keys to a new house. His mother is legally blind, and has a younger sister who is seeking a BA in psychology. Espino is by nature a polite and quiet character, as well as a bit of a foodie. In 2011, he married his sweetheart, Ana, with whom he has a daughter, Abigail Angel Espino.

== Boxing career ==
He was placed on the 'West Coast Team' in reality television show The Contender, and was matched against Peter Manfredo, the high-ranked boxer who had been reinstated into the show by popular vote amongst the contestants. He was unlucky to lose, the three judges giving Manfredo 144 points and Espino 141 - the maximum for the five round fight being 150.

On losing, he was hugely upset at missing his opportunity to lift his family out of their "plight". However, he won his next fight on the Contender rematch undercard, stopping Jonathan Reid in the fifth round out of five, and proceeded from there to go on an eleven fight winning streak from 2005 to 2009. He was able to win the WBC Caribbean Boxing Federation Middleweight title during this time, and established himself as a nice action fight on Telefutura boxing cards. This resulted in him getting a shot at WBC/WBO Middleweight champion Kelly Pavlik.

== Middleweight title shot ==
Espino fought Kelly Pavlik on December 19, 2009, at the Beeghly Center on the campus of Youngstown State University for the WBC, WBO and Ring Magazine middleweight titles. Miguel lost by way of fifth-round knockout after giving a spirited effort in which he went inside and traded with the champion, but while both guys landed a lot on each other, the power difference was clearly in Pavlik's favor, as he dropped Espino a lot prior to the stoppage.

== The Fighter ==
Miguel Espino appeared on The Fighter as Alfonso Sanchez who appears during the climax of the movie.
