= Alfonso López III =

American boxer (born 1982)

Personal information
- Nickname: El Tigre
- Born: Alfonso López III; May 16, 1982 (age 44) Corpus Christi, Texas, U.S.
- Height: 6 ft 1 in (185 cm)
- Weight: Super middleweight; Light heavyweight; Cruiserweight; Bridgerweight

Boxing career
- Reach: 76 in (193 cm)
- Stance: Orthodox

Boxing record
- Total fights: 40
- Wins: 36
- Win by KO: 27
- Losses: 4

Alfonso López III (born May 16, 1982) is a Mexican-American professional boxer. López fights out of Cut & Shoot, Texas. He’s the former WBC-Continental Americas super middleweight champion (2010), WBO-NABO light heavyweight champion (2019), WBC-NABF light heavyweight champion (2019), & WBC-NABF bridgerweight champion (2021). He was co-trained by former title contender Roy Harris.

== Personal life ==
Alfonso López III was born May 16, 1982 in Corpus Christi, Texas to Mexican parents.

López was an all-district football player at Corpus Christi Moody High School and went on to play linebacker at Sam Houston State University before ever boxing in the amateur ranks.

López is married to Cara Marie Skero López, they reside in The Woodlands, Texas, with their children.

Currently, López is the Owner of El Tigre Promotions & is serving the community with up & coming fighters in the Houston area.

== Amateur career ==
López was a two-time Texas Golden Gloves Champion and won a silver medal at the 2005 U.S. National Championships in the Light Heavyweight division.

With a short-lived amateur career, López decided to turn pro in 2007 after his graduation from Sam Houston State University.

== Professional career ==
In April 2010, in Corpus Christi, Texas, Alfonso won a six-round unanimous decision victory over Gabriel Holguin.

On November 4, 2010, Lopez fought for the vacant WBC Continental Americas Super Middleweight Championship in Dallas, Texas. Lopez won by TKO in Round 12 against Romaro Johnson, capturing his first world title.

On May 7, 2011, López lost to former world champion Kelly Pavlik by majority decision. This bout was on Showtime's televised portion of the Pacquiao vs. Mosley undercard.

On January 6, 2012, Lopez fought Dyah Davis (son of 1976 Olympic Gold Medalist Howard Davis Jr.) for the vacant NABF Super Middleweight title. Lopez dropped a 10-round unanimous decision to Davis.

February 28, 2013 Lopez had surgery on his left elbow and then had another surgery on March 27 for his right elbow. Lopez took time to rest and recover from the surgeries on his elbows.

"El Tigre" made his comeback on October 18, 2014, after a 2 1/2-year layoff to heal his injury. He won by TKO in Round 1 against Sean Rawley Wilson.

Lopez returned to the ring on the undercard of Canelo vs. Kirkland, May 9, 2015, in Houston, Texas at Minute Maid Park. El Tigre earned a 2nd-round KO victory over Cuban slugger Lester Gonzalez.

After almost 2 years off due to another injury, El Tigre returned to the ring March 24, 2017 against Colby Courter at the Humble Civic Center. The bout was stopped in round 3, giving Lopez a TKO victory.

Trying to stay active Lopez fought Rayford Johnson on June 30, 2017, who he had beaten years prior. Johnson's wanted to show Lopez that the first fight was a fluke and a bad day at the office. Lopez cruised to UD victory in an 8-round bout at the Humble Civic Center.

After a lay-off to promote his own promotional company, El Tigre Promotions. Once again the fight took place at Humble Civic Center, but this time under El Tigre Promotions. Lopez returned to fight Francisco Cordero for the vacant ABO Light Heavyweight Championship. Alfonso stopped his Colombian counterpart in round 8 to win the vacant belt.

On November 17, 2018, Lopez made his first successful defense of his ABO Light Heavyweight Championship. After sustaining a cut over his right eye, Lopez stopped Colombian Milton Núñez in the final round of their bout to retain the American Boxing Organization Light Heavyweight Championship.

On Saturday April 6, 2019, at the Galveston Island Convention Center in Galveston, Texas López defeated Melvin Russell, on his way to a TKO victory in round 5. With the push from Gilberto “El Zurdo” Ramírez Gilberto Ramírez to the light heavyweight division, Lopez took this time to call him out.

After signing to fight Alvin Varmall of New York, plans fell through. Colombian Alex Theran stepped up to challenge López for the vacant WBO NABO Light Heavyweight Championship. On July 13, 2019, at the Lone Star Convention Center in Conroe, Texas the men met in a bout. Theran refused to come out for the fifth round and the TKO victory made López the new WBO NABO Light Heavyweight Champion.

Lopez won the vacant NABF Light Heavyweight Championship against Denis Grachev on November 16, 2019, in an easy UD.

== Professional boxing record ==
| 40 fights | 36 wins | 4 losses |
|---|---|---|
| By knockout | 27 | 1 |
| By decision | 9 | 3 |

| No. | Result | Record | Opponent | Type | Round, time | Date | Location | Notes |
|---|---|---|---|---|---|---|---|---|
| 40 | Win | 36-4 | Roberto Silva | UD | 8 | Jun 6, 2026 | Galveston Island Convention Center, Galveston, Texas, U.S. | Won vacant ABO Intercontinental Cruiserweight title |
| 39 | Win | 35-4 | Daniel Gonzalez | KO | 1 (8), 2:05 | Apr 27, 2024 | Restaurante Bar Don Juan, Carmen de Apicala, Colombia | |
| 38 | Win | 34-4 | (United States) Roberto Silva | TD | 6 (10) | Apr 30, 2022 | (United States) Lone Star Convention & Expo Center, Conroe, Texas, U.S. | Technical decision due to accidental head butt. Retained WBC-NABF bridgerweight title |
| 37 | Win | 33-4 | (Hungary) Jozsef Darmos | TKO | 6 (10) | Dec 4, 2021 | (United States) Bayou Event Center, Houston, Texas, U.S. | Won vacant WBC-NABF bridgerweight title |
| 36 | Loss | 32–4 | (Mexico) Gilberto Ramírez | KO | 10 (12), 0:40 | Dec 18, 2020 | (United States) Galveston Island Convention Center, Galveston, Texas, U.S | Lost NABF light heavyweight title| |
| 35 | Win | 32–3 | (Russia) Denis Grachev | UD | 10 | Nov 16, 2019 | (United States) Lone Star Convention & Expo Center, Conroe, Texas, U.S. | Retained ABO and NBA light heavyweight titles; Won vacant WBC-NABF light heavyweight title |
| 34 | Win | 31–3 | (Colombia) Alex Theran | TKO | 4 (10) | Jul 13, 2019 | (United States) Lone Star Convention & Expo Center, Conroe, Texas, U.S. | Won vacant WBO-NABO, ABO, and NBA light heavyweight titles |
| 33 | Win | 30–3 | (United States) Melvin Russell | TKO | 5 (10) | Apr 6, 2019 | (United States) Galveston Island Convention Center, Galveston, Texas, U.S. | Won vacant ABO cruiserweight title |
| 32 | Win | 29–3 | (Colombia) Milton Núñez | TKO | 8 (8) | Nov 17, 2018 | (United States) Humble Civic Center Arena, Humble, Texas, U.S. | Retained ABO light heavyweight title |
| 31 | Win | 28–3 | (Colombia) Francisco Cordero | KO | 8 (10) | Jun 22, 2018 | (United States) Humble Civic Center Arena, Humble, Texas, U.S. | Won vacant ABO light heavyweight title |
| 30 | Win | 27–3 | (United States) Rayford Johnson | UD | 8 | Jun 30, 2017 | (United States) Humble Civic Center Arena, Humble, Texas, U.S. | |
| 29 | Win | 26–3 | (United States) Colby Courter | TKO | 3 (8) | Mar 24, 2017 | (United States) Humble Civic Center, Humble, Texas, U.S. | |
| 28 | Win | 25–3 | (Cuba) Lester Gonzalez | KO | 2 (6) | May 9, 2015 | (United States) Minute Maid Park, Houston, Texas, U.S. | |
| 27 | Win | 24–3 | (United States) Juan Reyna | RTD | 3 (5), 3:00 | Feb 28, 2015 | (United States) AYVA Center, Houston, Texas, U.S. | |
| 26 | Win | 23–3 | (United States) Sean Rawley Wilson | TKO | 1 (8), 2:00 | Oct 18, 2014 | (United States) Humble Civic Center Arena, Humble, Texas, U.S. | |
| 25 | Loss | 22–3 | (United States) Justin Williams | UD | 6 | Feb 18, 2012 | (United States) American Bank Center, Corpus Christi, Texas, U.S. | |
| 24 | Loss | 22–2 | (United States) Dyah Davis | UD | 10 | Jan 6, 2012 | (United States) Mallory Square, Key West, Florida, U.S. | For vacant WBC-NABF super middleweight title |
| 23 | Win | 22–1 | (United States) Michael Walkers | TKO | 7 (10), 0:10 | Sep 24, 2011 | (United States) American Bank Center, Corpus Christi, Texas, U.S. | |
| 22 | Loss | 21–1 | (United States) Kelly Pavlik | MD | 10 | May 7, 2011 | (United States) MGM Grand Garden Arena, Paradise, Nevada, U.S. | |
| 21 | Win | 21–0 | (United States) Romaro Johnson | TKO | 12 (12), 2:45 | Nov 4, 2010 | (United States) Dallas Petroleum Club, Dallas, U.S. | Won vacant WBC Continental Americas super middleweight title |
| 20 | Win | 20–0 | (United States) Rubin Williams | UD | 10 | Jun 17, 2010 | (United States) Humble Civic Center Arena, Humble, Texas, U.S. | |
| 19 | Win | 19–0 | (United States) Gabriel Holguin | UD | 6 | Apr 3, 2012 | (United States) American Bank Center, Corpus Christi, Texas, U.S. | |
| 18 | Win | 18–0 | (United States) Tiwon Taylor | KO | 2 (6), 1:41 | Nov 19, 2009 | (United States) Stafford Center, Stafford, Texas, U.S. | |
| 17 | Win | 17–0 | (United States) James Johnson | TKO | 4 (6), 1:47 | Oct 17, 2009 | (United States) Whataburger Field, Corpus Christi, Texas, U.S. | |
| 16 | Win | 16–0 | (United States) Aaron Norwood | TKO | 4 (8), 1:13 | Sep 16, 2009 | (United States) Humble Civic Center Arena, Humble, Texas, U.S. | |
| 15 | Win | 15–0 | (United States) Quinton Smith | TKO | 2 (6), 2:14 | Aug 7, 2009 | (United States) National Guard Armory, Columbia, Tennessee, U.S. | |
| 14 | Win | 14–0 | (United States) Ronald Weaver | UD | 10 | May 8, 2009 | (United States) Pontchartrain Center, Kenner, Louisiana, U.S. | |
| 13 | Win | 13–0 | (United States) Billy Thompson | TKO | 3 (8), 2:05 | Mar 26, 2009 | (United States) Humble Civic Center Arena, Humble, U.S. | Won USA Texas State super middleweight title |
| 12 | Win | 12–0 | (United States) Johnathan Bruce | KO | 1 (4), 1:21 | Mar 7, 2009 | (United States) West Junior High, West Memphis, Arkansas, U.S. | |
| 11 | Win | 11–0 | (United States) James Johnson | TKO | 5 (6), 0:51 | Jan 15, 2009 | (United States) Crowne Plaza Hotel, Houston, Texas, U.S. | |
| 10 | Win | 10–0 | (United States) abriel Rivera | TKO | 3 (4), 1:54 | Aug 15, 2008 | (United States) Convention Center, Pasadena, Texas, U.S. | |
| 9 | Win | 9–0 | (United States) Theo Kruger | TKO | 5 (6), 2:35 | Jul 11, 2008 | (United States) American Bank Center, Corpus Christi, Texas, U.S. | |
| 8 | Win | 8–0 | (United States) Rayford Johnson | UD | 6 | May 24, 2008 | (United States) Richard M. Borchard Regional Fairgrounds, Robstown, Texas, U.S. | |
| 7 | Win | 7–0 | (United States) Anthony Greeley | RTD | 4 (6), 0:10 | Apr 17, 2008 | (United States) Grand Plaza Hotel, Houston, Texas, U.S. | |
| 6 | Win | 6–0 | (United States) Raheem Gordon | TKO | 6 (6), 1:15 | Jan 17, 2008 | (United States) Grand Plaza Hotel, Houston, Texas, U.S. | |
| 5 | Win | 5–0 | (United States) Larry Pryor | TKO | 5 (6), 0:10 | Nov 29, 2007 | (United States) Grand Plaza Hotel, Houston, Texas, U.S. | |
| 4 | Win | 4–0 | (United States) Jonathan Jones | TKO | 1 (4), 2:49 | Sep 20, 2007 | (United States) Grand Plaza Hotel, Houston, Texas, U.S. | |
| 3 | Win | 3–0 | (United States) Jason Lane | TKO | 2 (4), 1:23 | Aug 2, 2007 | (United States) Grand Plaza Hotel, Houston, Texas, U.S. | |
| 2 | Win | 2–0 | (United States) Jason Crawford | KO | 1 (4), 1:07 | Jun 9, 2007 | (United States) Convention Center, Pasadena, Texas, U.S. | |
| 1 | Win | 1–0 | (United States) Bonnie Joe Mcgee | UD | 4 | Mar 17, 2007 | (United States) American Bank Center, Corpus Christi, Texas, U.S. | |
