= Viorel Badea =

Romanian politician

Viorel Riceard Badea
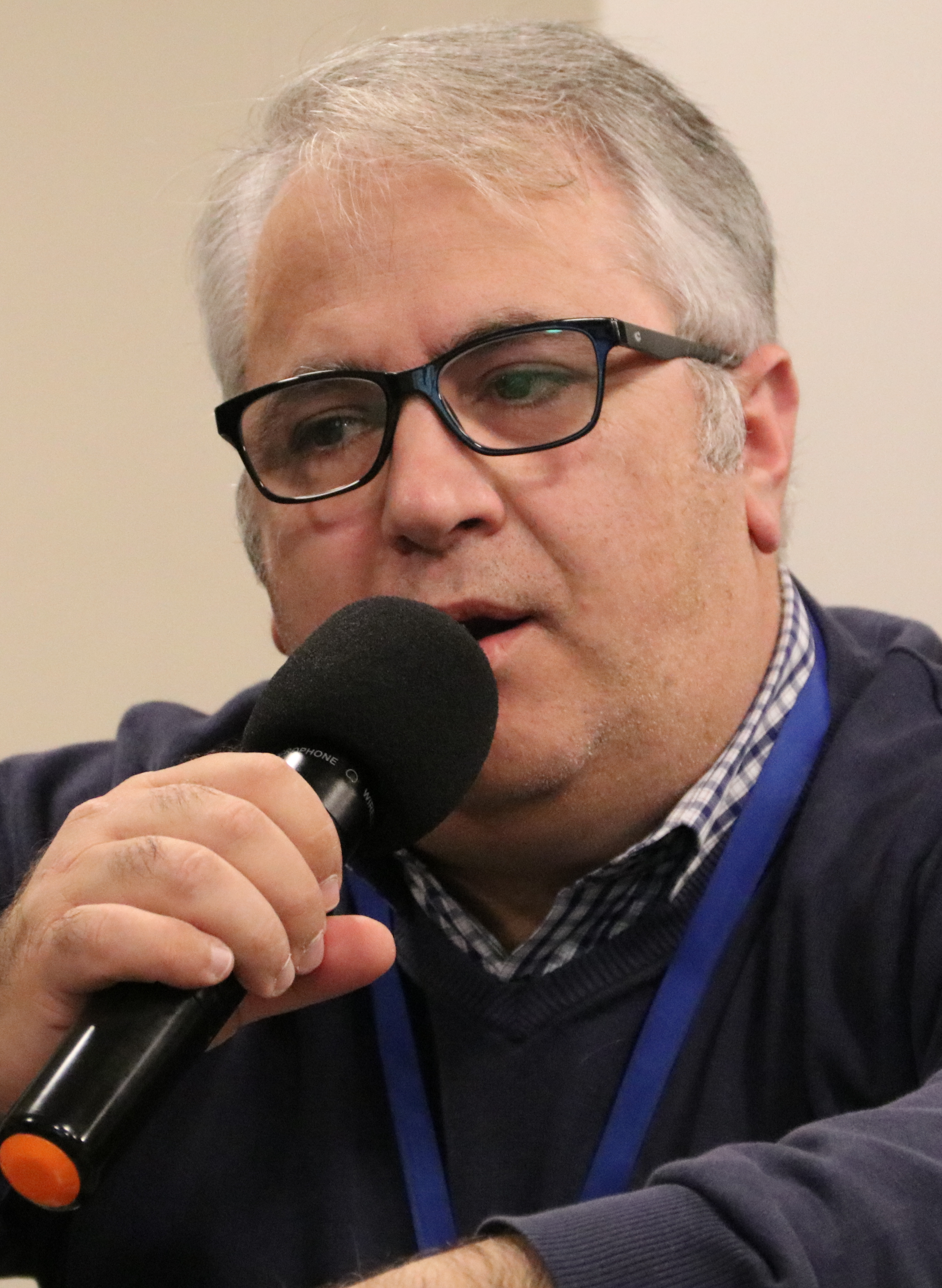
- Viorel Badea in October 2016.

Member of the Senate of Romania
- Incumbent
- Assumed office 2008
- President: Traian Băsescu

Personal details
- Born: 21 June 1968 (age 58) Craiova
- Children: 2
- Education: University of Bucharest

Viorel Riceard Badea (born 21 June 1968, Craiova) is a Romanian politician, member of the Senate of Romania.

== Early life and career ==
Badea graduated from the University of Bucharest. He worked as the head of The Department for Romanians Abroad (1999–2000) and as an adviser for the Ministry of Foreign Affairs (2000–2006).

== Political career ==
Badea has been a member of the Senate of Romania since the 2008 elections. In March 2010, he opened a Parliamentary Bureau in Chişinău. In 2015 he switched from the Democratic Liberal Party to the National Liberal Party.

In the legislature 2008–2012, Badea was a member of the Friendship Parliamentary Groups with Italy, Iraq, Serbia, Albania and Spain. In his parliamentary activity, he was a member of the commission for foreign policy – Deputy Chairperson (until March 2011), Romanians Everywhere Committee - Chairperson and also, at the Committee for privatization and administration of state assets (Mar. - Sep. 2011). He also initiated 41 legislative proposals, out of which 7 laws were promulgated.

In the legislature 2012–2016, Badea was a member of the parliamentary friendship groups with Serbia, Egypt, Norway and Iraq. He was a member of the Committee for foreign policy and the Committee for Romanians everywhere. In the 2016-2020 legislature, he is a member of the parliamentary friendship groups with Lebanon, Oman and the United Arab Emirates.

In addition to his role in parliament, Badean has been serving as a member of the Romanian delegation to the Parliamentary Assembly of the Council of Europe since 2009. In the Assembly, he has been a member of the Committee on Social Affairs, Health and Sustainable Development (since 2021); the Committee on Equality and Non-Discrimination (since 2021); the Committee on the Honouring of Obligations and Commitments by Member States of the Council of Europe (since 2020); the Sub-Committee on the European Social Charter (since 2018); the Sub-Committee on Children (since 2017); the Sub-Committee on the Rights of Minorities (since 2017); the Committee on Political Affairs and Democracy (2012–2013); and the Committee on Culture, Science, Education and Media (2012–2013). For the 2018 Azerbaijani presidential election, he led the Assembly's monitoring mission. In 2021, he served as the Assembly's rapporteur on the impact of labour migration on left-behind children.
