= Kelly Pavlik =

American boxer (born 1982)

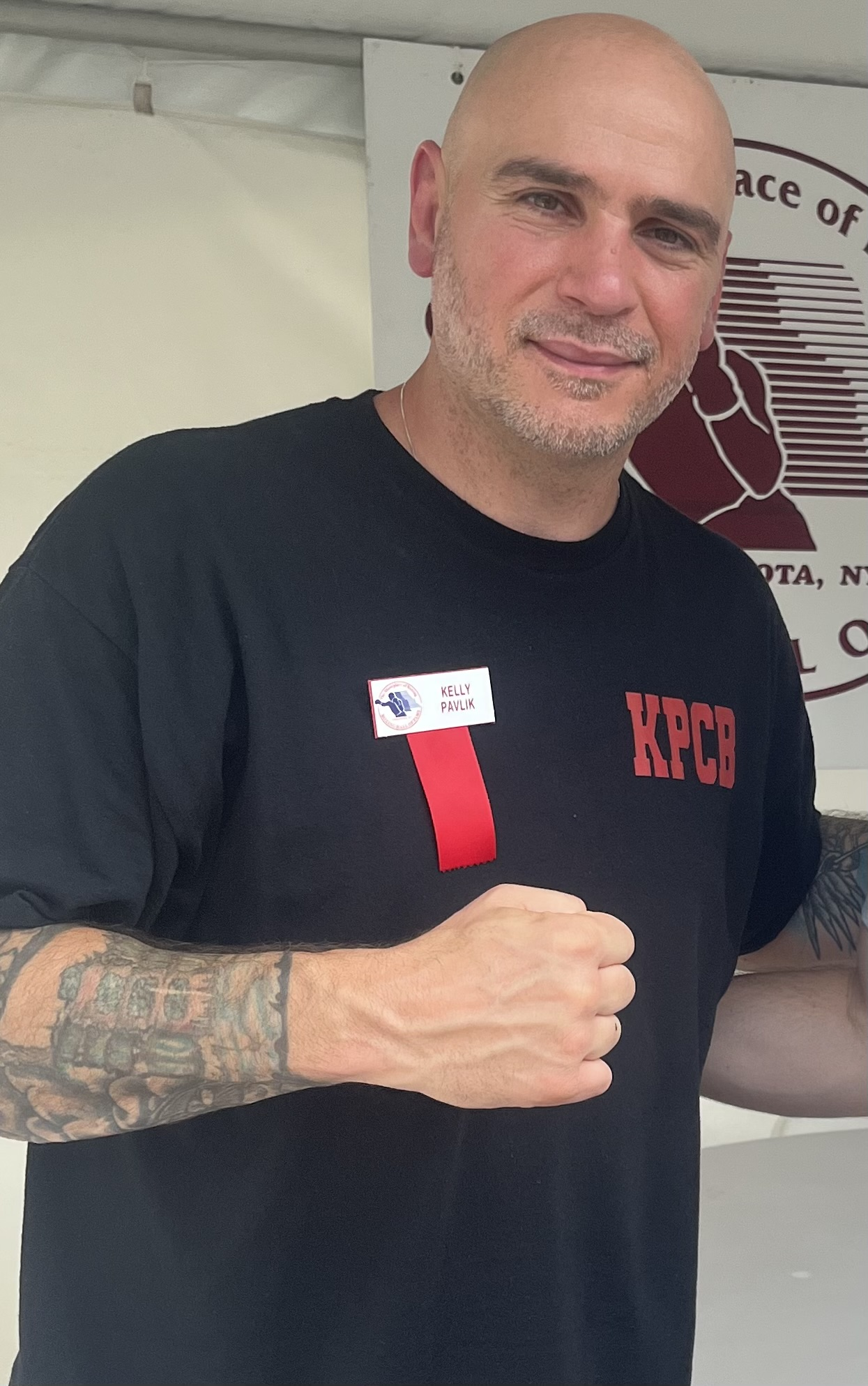

Personal information
- Nicknames: The Ghost; The Express
- Born: Kelly Robert Pavlik; April 5, 1982 (age 44) Youngstown, Ohio, U.S.
- Height: 6 ft 2 1/2 in (189 cm)
- Weight: Middleweight

Boxing career
- Reach: 75 in (191 cm)
- Stance: Orthodox

Boxing record
- Total fights: 42
- Wins: 40
- Win by KO: 34
- Losses: 2

Kelly Robert Pavlik (born April 5, 1982) is an American former professional boxer who competed from 2000 to 2012. He won the unified WBC, WBO, Ring magazine and lineal middleweight titles by defeating Jermain Taylor in 2007, and made three successful defenses before losing them to Sergio Martínez in 2010.

== Background and early life ==
Known as "The Ghost", Pavlik grew up on the south side of Youngstown, Ohio, in the traditional ethnic Slovak neighborhood of Lansingville. He graduated from Lowellville High School and Mahoning County Joint Vocational School in 2000. Pavlik has been trained by Jack Loew of Youngstown's South Side Boxing Gym for his entire career.

== Amateur highlights ==
- 1998 National Jr. PAL Amateur Champion, 147 pounds
- 1998 National Jr. Golden Gloves Amateur Champion, 147 pounds
- 1999 U.S. National Under-19 Amateur Champion, 147 pounds

== Professional career ==
Pavlik turned professional in 2000 and won his first 26 fights before stepping up in competition on October 7, 2005, to face Fulgencio Zúñiga for the vacant NABF Middleweight title. Zúñiga scored a knockdown with a left hook in the first round, but Pavlik recovered quickly and dominated the rest of the fight. Zúñiga was cut over his right eye by a clash of heads, and his corner stopped the fight after the ninth round.

On July 7, 2006, Pavlik defeated the former WBO Light Middleweight Champion Bronco McKart with sixth round technical knock out in his first defense of his NABF Middleweight title. McKart scored a knockdown when both of Pavlik's gloves touched the canvas in the fourth round. Pavlik knocked McKart down twice in the sixth round before the referee stopped the fight.

Pavlik headlined in his hometown at the Covelli Centre on November 2, 2006, and put on a dominant performance against Lenord Pierre. Pavlik scored a knockdown with a right hand late in the first round, and rocked Pierre repeatedly in the second and third rounds. Pavlik knocked down Pierre again with a left hook in the fourth round and the referee stopped the fight.

On January 27, 2007, in Anaheim, California, Pavlik defeated Jose Luis Zertuche with an eighth-round knockout in his second and final defense of his NABF Middleweight title. It was a fast-paced, exciting fight that concluded when Pavlik landed a right fist that froze Zertuche in his tracks and then landed an uppercut that dropped him face-first to the canvas.

=== Pavlik vs. Miranda ===
Pavlik defeated Edison Miranda on May 19, 2007, with a technical knock out in the seventh round. The fight was a WBC Middleweight Title Eliminator bout. This fight established him as the #1 middleweight contender. During the sixth round, Pavlik knocked Miranda down to the canvas twice. After the first knock down, Miranda spat out his mouthpiece, causing the referee, Steve Smoger, to deduct a point. As the sixth round ended, Miranda seemed unable to continue, but came out nonetheless. In the seventh round, Pavlik trapped Miranda in a corner with a barrage of vicious shots, forcing Smoger to stop the fight. Pavlik thus earned a chance for the middleweight title against Jermain Taylor, who had defeated Pavlik during their amateur careers in a bout that was part of the 2000 Olympic Team-USA Box-offs.

=== Pavlik vs. Taylor I & II ===
In Atlantic City, New Jersey, in front of a pro-Pavlik crowd (approximately 6,231 Youngstown natives made the trip), Pavlik defeated Jermain Taylor on September 29, 2007. In the pre-fight build-up, Taylor's trainer, Emmanuel Steward, called Pavlik "overrated" and promised a knockout win for his boxer. It nearly happened, as Pavlik was knocked down in the second round and tossed about the ring for much of that round. However, using his ability to trap opponents in the corner, Pavlik slowly turned the tide on Taylor. By the sixth round, many at the ringside, such as the HBO commentator Larry Merchant, saw the fight as even. HBO's unofficial scorer, Harold Lederman, even had Pavlik leading the fight at the halfway point. Despite this, he was trailing on all three official scorecards. In the seventh round, Pavlik stunned his opponent with a clean left hook to the chin and backed him against the ropes knocking Taylor out with a barrage of punches. With the victory, Pavlik became the new WBC, WBO, The Ring and lineal middleweight champion. After the fight with Taylor, Pavlik and his father, Mike Pavlik Sr., accidentally left their paychecks in their hotel room. He was named The Boxing Times Fighter of the Year in 2007.

This fight was named Fight of the Year by the Boxing Writers Association of America.

After the defeat, Taylor activated his clause for a non-title rematch, which was held on February 16 at the MGM Grand Garden Arena in Paradise, Nevada, with both fighters weighing-in at super middleweight. Pavlik won the fight with a unanimous decision (117-111, 116-112 and 115–113), handing Taylor his second defeat.

=== Pavlik vs. Lockett ===
Pavlik made his first title defense of the Middleweight Championship against the WBO #1 mandatory challenger Gary Lockett on June 7, 2008, at Boardwalk Hall in Atlantic City. Pavlik defeated Lockett with a third round technical knock out after Enzo Calzaghe, Lockett's trainer, threw in the towel when Lockett was down for the third time.

=== Pavlik vs. Hopkins ===
In a HBO PPV non-title bout on October 18, 2008, 43-year-old Bernard Hopkins (49-5-1 with 32 KOs) won a unanimous decision over Pavlik. Hopkins and Pavlik fought at a catch weight of 170 lbs (5 pounds below the light heavyweight limit) in a twelve-round non-title bout. Hopkins dominated the whole fight with multiple punch combinations, good defense and movement. Both fighters fought after the bell and needed to be separated by their corners.

=== Pavlik vs. Rubio ===
On February 21, 2009, his first bout after his defeat to Hopkins, Pavlik defeated Marco Antonio Rubio (the WBC #1 contender) in his hometown of Youngstown, Ohio, at the Chevy Centre with a ninth-round technical knockout. Pavlik dominated the fight, forcing Rubio's corner to concede the bout before the start of the tenth round.

=== Pavlik vs. Espino ===
Pavlik fought The Contender alumnus Miguel Espino on December 19, 2009, at the Beeghly Center on the campus of Youngstown State University and won with a fifth-round technical knockout.

=== Pavlik vs. Martinez ===
Following his win over Espino, Pavlik was set to fight Paul Williams. However, due to a major staph infection and an allergic reaction to some antibiotics that nearly killed him, Pavlik was forced to drop out of the fight. He was eventually able to fight again against the Light Middleweight Champion Sergio Martínez.

On April 17, 2010, Pavlik attempted to defend his middleweight title for the fourth time against Sergio Martínez in Atlantic City. The fight was for Pavlik's WBC, WBO and The Ring Middleweight titles. Pavlik was defeated by Martinez by a unanimous 12-round decision.

Martínez controlled the early rounds with quick in and out movements, refusing to heavily engage with Pavlik. Martínez managed to cut Pavlik's left eyebrow in the first round. Pavlik then started to mount a comeback in the middle rounds by blocking Martínez's punches more effectively. Pavlik spent most of his time headhunting trying to land a hard right, which did help Pavlik score a knock-down in the seventh round. In the late rounds, Martínez came back and started to open up Pavlik's cuts more, making his face extremely bloody. In the post-fight interview, Pavlik stated that he could not see due to the blood.

=== Rehabilitation and return ===
Pavlik was set to move up the super middleweight division and fight Brian Vera, as the co-main event to Manny Pacquiao vs. Antonio Margarito on November 13, 2010. However, roughly two weeks before the fight, Pavlik suffered a rib injury and had to pull out of the fight. He checked himself into the Betty Ford Center for alcohol rehabilitation.

Pavlik then fought Alfonso López III in the main card of Manny Pacquiao vs. Shane Mosley. He won with a majority decision (95-95, 98–92, 99–91).

After taking nearly a year off from boxing, Pavlik defeated Aaron Jaco in a largely unpublicized fight in San Antonio, Texas. Three months later, on June 8, 2012, Pavlik made his return to the national spotlight, defeating Scott Sigmon on ESPN2's Friday Night Fights. Sigmon had attacked Pavlik on Twitter, leading Pavlik to respond, "I'm gonna hurt this kid". Despite never knocking Sigmon down, Pavlik attacked the face of Sigmon, especially in the fifth, sixth and seventh rounds. Badly bloodied, Sigmon conceded after the seventh round. On July 7, 2012, Pavlik fought the fairly-highly touted, up-and-coming prospect: Will Rosinsky. He defeated Rosinsky with a unanimous decision, to earn the fortieth win of his professional boxing career.

=== Pavlik vs. Ward ===
Pavlik was scheduled to fight on HBO the lineal super middleweight, as well as WBA and WBC, champion Andre Ward for his title on January 26, 2013 at the Galen Center in Los Angeles, California. The fight was initially rescheduled for February 23, 2013 after Andre Ward suffered a shoulder injury in a sparring session leading up to the fight. However, the shoulder injury was more severe than originally thought and the fight was ultimately cancelled.

=== Retirement ===
January 19, 2013 Kelly Pavlik announced his retirement from boxing. He no longer had the heart for the sport and had also been suffering from seizures, which contributed to his decision.

== Arrests ==
Kelly Pavlik was charged with theft on September 18, 2013 after he had refused to pay a cab fare. Pavlik was arrested on Saturday of April 2015 for assault at a Foo Fighters concert.

On January 26, 2016 Pavlik was charged with misdemeanor assault after shooting a worker with a pellet gun while he was digging a lake at Pavlik's home in August 2015. The case was upgraded to felonious assault after it was presented to a grand jury.

== Professional boxing record ==
42 fights	40 wins	2 losses
By knockout	34	0
By decision	6	2

No.	Result	Record	Opponent	Type	Round, time	Date	Location	Notes
42	Win	40–2	Will Rosinsky	UD	10	Jul 7, 2012	Home Depot Center, Carson, California, U.S.	
41	Win	39–2	Scott Sigmon	TKO	7 (10), 3:00	Jun 8, 2012	The Joint, Paradise, Nevada, U.S.	
40	Win	38–2	Aaron Jaco	TKO	2 (10), 0:45	Mar 31, 2012	Illusions Theater, San Antonio, Texas, U.S.	
39	Win	37–2	Alfonso López III	MD	10	May 7, 2011	MGM Grand Garden Arena, Paradise, Nevada, U.S.	
38	Loss	36–2	Sergio Martínez	UD	12	Apr 17, 2010	Boardwalk Hall, Atlantic City, New Jersey, U.S.	Lost WBC, WBO, and The Ring middleweight titles
37	Win	36–1	Miguel Espino	TKO	5 (12), 1:44	Dec 19, 2009	Beeghly Center, Youngstown, Ohio, U.S.	Retained WBC, WBO, and The Ring middleweight titles
36	Win	35–1	Marco Antonio Rubio	RTD	9 (12), 3:00	Feb 21, 2009	Chevrolet Centre, Youngstown, Ohio, U.S.	Retained WBC, WBO, and The Ring middleweight titles
35	Loss	34–1	Bernard Hopkins	UD	12	Oct 18, 2008	Boardwalk Hall, Atlantic City, New Jersey, U.S.	
34	Win	34–0	Gary Lockett	TKO	3 (12), 1:40	Jun 7, 2008	Boardwalk Hall, Atlantic City, New Jersey, U.S.	Retained WBC, WBO, and The Ring middleweight titles
33	Win	33–0	Jermain Taylor	UD	12	Feb 16, 2008	MGM Grand Garden Arena, Paradise, Nevada, U.S.	
32	Win	32–0	Jermain Taylor	TKO	7 (12), 2:14	Sep 29, 2007	Boardwalk Hall, Atlantic City, New Jersey, U.S.	Won WBC, WBO, and The Ring middleweight titles
31	Win	31–0	Edison Miranda	TKO	7 (12), 1:54	May 19, 2007	FedExForum, Memphis, Tennessee, U.S.	
30	Win	30–0	Jose Luis Zertuche	KO	8 (12), 1:40	Jan 27, 2007	Honda Center, Anaheim, California, U.S.	Retained NABF middleweight title
29	Win	29–0	Lenord Pierre	TKO	4 (12), 0:46	Nov 2, 2006	Chevrolet Centre, Youngstown, Ohio, U.S.	
28	Win	28–0	Bronco McKart	TKO	6 (12), 2:45	Jul 27, 2006	Mohegan Sun Arena, Montville, Connecticut, U.S.	Won vacant NABF middleweight title
27	Win	27–0	Fulgencio Zúñiga	TKO	9 (12), 3:00	Oct 7, 2005	The Aladdin, Paradise, Nevada, U.S.	Won vacant NABF middleweight title
26	Win	26–0	Vincent Harris	TKO	2 (8), 2:19	Aug 26, 2005	D & I Colonial Ballroom, Houston, Texas, U.S.	
25	Win	25–0	Daniel Neal	TKO	1 (8), 1:49	Jun 10, 2005	Aragon Ballroom, Chicago, Illinois, U.S.	
24	Win	24–0	Dorian Beaupierre	TKO	2 (10), 2:35	Mar 4, 2005	Silver Star Hotel and Casino, Choctaw, Mississippi, U.S.	
23	Win	23–0	Ross Thompson	UD	8	Nov 27, 2004	MGM Grand Garden Arena, Paradise, Nevada, U.S.	
22	Win	22–0	Carlton Holland	KO	2 (8), 2:59	Sep 18, 2004	MGM Grand Garden Arena, Paradise, Nevada, U.S.	
21	Win	21–0	Pedro Ortega	TKO	6 (10)	Jul 2, 2004	Fieldhouse, Struthers, Ohio, U.S.	
20	Win	20–0	Roberto Baro	KO	2 (8), 2:16	Mar 26, 2004	Dodge Theatre, Phoenix, Arizona, U.S.	
19	Win	19–0	Anthony Ivory	UD	8	Jan 23, 2004	Expo Center, Kansas City, Missouri, U.S.	
18	Win	18–0	Rico Cason	KO	2 (10), 2:02	Jul 1, 2003	Cafaro Field, Niles, Ohio, U.S.	
17	Win	17–0	Cesar Avila	TKO	6 (6), 2:00	Mar 22, 2003	Mandalay Bay Events Center, Paradise, Nevada, U.S.	
16	Win	16–0	Eduardo Gutierrez	TKO	2 (6), 2:59	Feb 8, 2003	Mandalay Bay Events Center, Paradise, Nevada, U.S.	
15	Win	15–0	Edson Madrid	UD	6	Sep 14, 2002	Mandalay Bay Events Center, Paradise, Nevada, U.S.	
14	Win	14–0	Abel Hernandez	TKO	1 (6), 2:54	Jul 30, 2002	Lucky Star Casino, Concho, Oklahoma, U.S.	
13	Win	13–0	Eric Olds	KO	1 (6), 2:45	Jun 21, 2002	The Orleans, Paradise, Nevada, U.S.	
12	Win	12–0	Robert Dasoyan	KO	2 (6), 2:15	Feb 23, 2002	Mandalay Bay Events Center, Paradise, Nevada, U.S.	
11	Win	11–0	Rob Bleakley	KO	2 (8), 1:56	Nov 21, 2001	Holiday Inn Metroplex, Youngstown, Ohio, U.S.	
10	Win	10–0	Mario Lopez	TKO	2 (6), 1:42	Aug 4, 2001	Mandalay Bay Events Center, Paradise, Nevada, U.S.	
9	Win	9–0	Grady Brewer	TKO	2 (4), 2:48	Jun 8, 2001	Ho-Chunk Casino, Baraboo, Wisconsin, U.S.	
8	Win	8–0	Tommy Walker	TKO	1 (4), 2:46	Mar 23, 2001	Sports Center, Owensboro, Kentucky, U.S.	
7	Win	7–0	Mathias Bedburdick	TKO	3 (4), 2:43	Feb 4, 2001	Lucky Star Casino, Concho, Oklahoma, U.S.	
6	Win	6–0	Cedric Johnson	TKO	2 (4), 1:54	Dec 15, 2000	Alliant Energy Center, Madison, Wisconsin, U.S.	
5	Win	5–0	Lafayette Randolph	TKO	2 (4), 1:48	Nov 17, 2000	Peppermill, Reno, Nevada, U.S.	
4	Win	4–0	Anthony Collier	TKO	1 (4)	Oct 15, 2000	Nashville, Tennessee, U.S.	
3	Win	3–0	Frankie Sanchez	TKO	1 (4), 1:59	Sep 15, 2000	Pepsi Center, Denver, Colorado, U.S.	
2	Win	2–0	Nelson Hernandez	TKO	1 (4)	Aug 5, 2000	Alliant Energy Center, Madison, Wisconsin, U.S.	
1	Win	1–0	Eric Benito Tzand	TKO	3 (4)	Jun 16, 2000	Fantasy Springs Resort Casino, Indio, California, U.S.	

== Titles in boxing ==
=== Major world titles ===
- WBC middleweight champion (160 lbs)
- WBO middleweight champion (160 lbs)

=== The Ring magazine titles ===
- The Ring middleweight champion (160 lbs)

=== Regional/International titles ===
- NABF middleweight champion (160 lbs)

=== Honorary titles ===
- WBO Super Champion

== See also ==
- List of middleweight boxing champions
- List of WBC world champions
- List of WBO world champions
- List of The Ring world champions

Sporting positions
Regional boxing titles
Vacant Title last held by Kingsley Ikeke	NABF middleweight champion October 7, 2005 – June 2006; Vacated	Vacant Title next held by David Alonso López
Vacant Title last held by Kingsley Ikeke	NABF middleweight champion July 27, 2006 – August 2007; Vacated	Vacant Title next held by Bronco McKart
World boxing titles
Preceded by Jermain Taylor	WBC middleweight champion September 29, 2007 – April 17, 2010	Succeeded by Sergio Martínez
Preceded by Jermain Taylor	WBO middleweight champion September 29, 2007 – April 17, 2010	Succeeded by Sergio Martínez
Preceded by Jermain Taylor	The Ring middleweight champion September 29, 2007 – April 17, 2010	Succeeded by Sergio Martínez
Awards
Previous: Somsak Sithchatchawal vs. Mahyar Monshipour	BWAA Fight of the Year vs. Jermain Taylor; 2007	Next: Israel Vázquez vs. Rafael Márquez III
