= Badea (disambiguation) =

Badea (Passiflora quadrangularis) is a species of plant.

Badea may also refer to:

== Romanian name ==
- Alexandra Badea (born 1998), Romanian handballer
- Alexandru Badea (1938–1986), Romanian footballer
- Alin Badea (born 1988), Romanian sabre fencer
- Bela Badea, Romanian chess player
- Christian Badea (born 1947), Romanian-American opera and symphonic conductor
- Doina Badea (1940-1977), Romanian singer of popular music
- Ioana Badea (born 1964), Romanian rower
- Ionuț Badea (born 1975), Romanian footballer and manager
- Liana Badea (born 1989), Romanian female volleyball player
- Mircea Badea (born 1974), Romanian satirist and media personality
- Pavel Badea (born 1967), Romanian footballer
- Stelian Badea (born 1958), Romanian footballer
- Tony Badea (born 1974), Romanian-Canadian boxer
- Valentin Badea (born 1982), Romanian footballer
- Viorel Badea (born 1968), Romanian politician
- Badea Cârțan, nickname of Gheorghe Cârțan (1849–1911), Romanian shepherd and independence fighter

== Other uses ==
- Arab Bank for Economic Development in Africa (Banque Arabe pour le Développement Economique en Afrique, BADEA)

== See also ==
- Badeau, a surname
- Badeaux, a surname
