= Paul Williams (boxer) =

American boxer (born 1981)

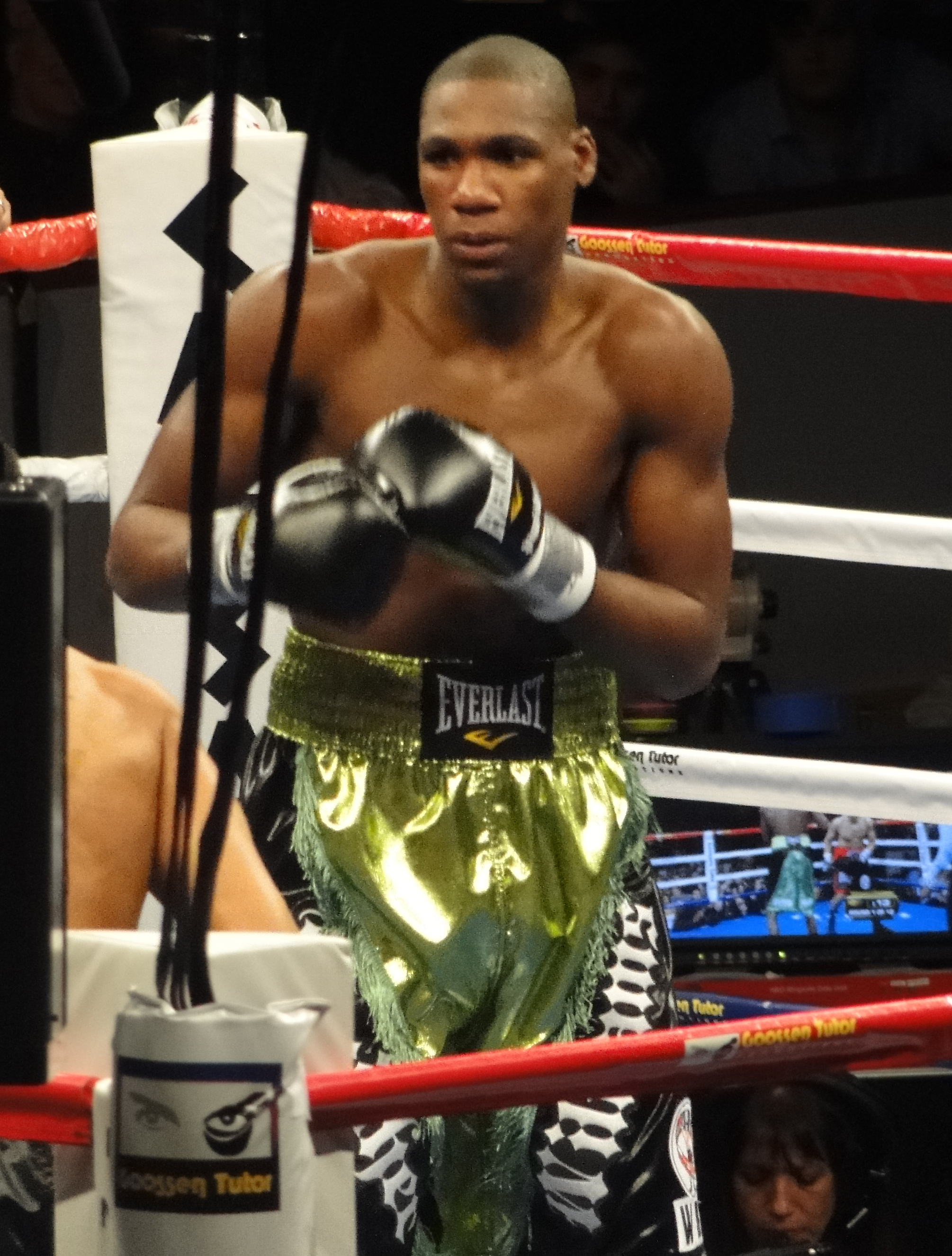
- Williams vs. Martínez, 2010

Personal information
- Nicknames: The Punisher; P-Will
- Born: July 27, 1981 (age 44) Augusta, Georgia, U.S.
- Height: 6 ft 2 in (188 cm)
- Weight: Welterweight; Light middleweight; Middleweight

Boxing career
- Reach: 78 in (198 cm)
- Stance: Southpaw

Boxing record
- Total fights: 43
- Wins: 41
- Win by KO: 27
- Losses: 2

Paul Williams (born July 27, 1981) is an American former professional boxer who competed from 2000 to 2012. He held the WBO welterweight title twice between 2007 and 2008, the WBO interim junior middleweight title in 2008, and challenged once for the unified middleweight title in 2010. Nicknamed "The Punisher", and standing at a height of 6 feet 2 inches, Williams was unusually tall for the three divisions in which he competed. His career was cut short in 2012 after a motorcycle accident left him paralyzed from the waist down. During 2010 he was ranked 5th in The Ring Pound for Pound Rankings.

== Professional career ==
=== Early years at welterweight ===
His debut was in the year 2000. He is promoted by the Goossens. In 2005 he outpointed former Olympic bronze medalist Terrence Cauthen and, later that year, he knocked out Alfonso Sanchez in 5 rounds. His ESPN debut was a second-round knockout of Sergio Rios on Wednesday Night Fights. Williams made his HBO debut against then-undefeated Walter Matthysse, winning by a tenth-round technical knockout. That was followed by a victory over former junior welterweight world champion Sharmba Mitchell. He knocked Mitchell down three times en route to a fourth-round TKO.

==== WBO Welterweight Championship ====
Williams became the mandatory challenger for WBO Welterweight Champion Antonio Margarito. The match took place July 14, 2007, in Carson, California, at the Home Depot Center with Williams winning a unanimous decision in which turned out to be a close fight where Williams' seemingly stronger finish seemed to seal him the decision victory in the eyes of boxing experts and fans alike. Williams fought Carlos Quintana on February 9, 2008, in his first defense of his title. Williams lost to Quintana by decision in what many considered a minor upset.

Williams and Quintana had a rematch at the Mohegan Sun Arena in Uncasville, Connecticut on June 7, 2008, for the WBO Welterweight title, at Williams' request. Williams got off to a quick start when a left hand sent Quintana into a daze as several follow-up barrages put Quintana down. He got up, but Williams opened up with dozens of unanswered punches as the referee jumped in to stop the fight while Quintana was going down again.

Williams was rumored to be moving up two weight classes to fight Kelly Pavlik for the WBC Middleweight title but instead Pavlik himself decided to move up two weight classes himself to fight Bernard Hopkins. Williams fought Andy Kolle on September 25. Williams dominated the fight from the start and recorded a first-round knockout in 1:37 seconds.

=== Light Middleweight ===
After failing to secure another meaningful contest at welterweight, Williams vacated his WBO welterweight title in order to fight Verno Phillips for the WBO Interim Light Middleweight title.

On November 29, 2008, Williams defeated Phillips by way of TKO after 8 rounds after the Doctor stopped the fight. In doing so he secured the WBO Interim Light Middleweight title.

=== Middleweight ===
==== Winky Wright ====
Williams fought Winky Wright on April 11, 2009, in a 12-round middleweight bout featured on HBO. Williams defeated Wright in a unanimous decision which was not close on the scorecards – two of the three judges gave Williams all but one round while the third scored all 12 rounds for Williams.

Williams was then preparing to fight Middleweight Champion Kelly Pavlik in a bout scheduled to take place on October 3, 2009, in Atlantic City, New Jersey. The bout was postponed when it was discovered Pavlik had a staph infection in his knuckle and had been rescheduled for December 5. However, the bout was called off for a second time six weeks prior to the fight because Pavlik's infection had not completely healed.

==== Sergio Martínez ====
On December 5, 2009, Paul Williams fought Sergio Martínez in a war of a twelve-round main event. In the first round Martinez was knocked down due to bad balance and a grazing left hand that landed just below the ear. In the final seconds of the 1st round though Martinez scored a knockdown of his own over Williams. The next two rounds were heavily in Martinez's favor as he hit Williams with barrages of counter punches. After Martinez was seemingly won the first 3 rounds, rounds 4-7 showed Williams coming back effectively landing hard lefts to the head of Martinez. In rounds 8-10 Martinez again confused Williams with using different varieties of punches, including straight lead lefts to the body followed by right hooks to the head and straight lefts to the face. The final 2 rounds showed much fatigue in Martinez and Williams but both warriors fought through to the end, although Williams seemed to win both of the last 2 rounds by being the far more active boxer (while the punching exchanges were very closely contested during those final 2 rounds as well), which would ultimately prove to be the difference and as a result of having far superior activity during those final 2 rounds, Williams won a close majority decision over Martinez. The judges scored the fight 114–114, 115–113 for Williams and 119–110 for Williams, thus making Williams emerge as the majority decision winner.

==== Kermit Cintron ====
After his close win over Sergio Martínez, Paul Williams moved on to face Puerto Rican prospect Kermit Cintrón. The two met on May 8, 2010, Live on Saturday Night HBO Boxing. In the fourth round, Kermit Cintron fell out of the ring unintentionally and was not allowed to continue fighting due to hitting the arena floor. Williams was ahead on two of the three judges' scorecards at the time of the stoppage and was declared the winner by split technical decision. Cintron, who believed he should have been ahead on the scorecards, filed a complaint to have the ruling changed to a no-contest, claiming he was not given the five-minute recovery time allowed under California rules.

=== Williams vs Martinez II ===
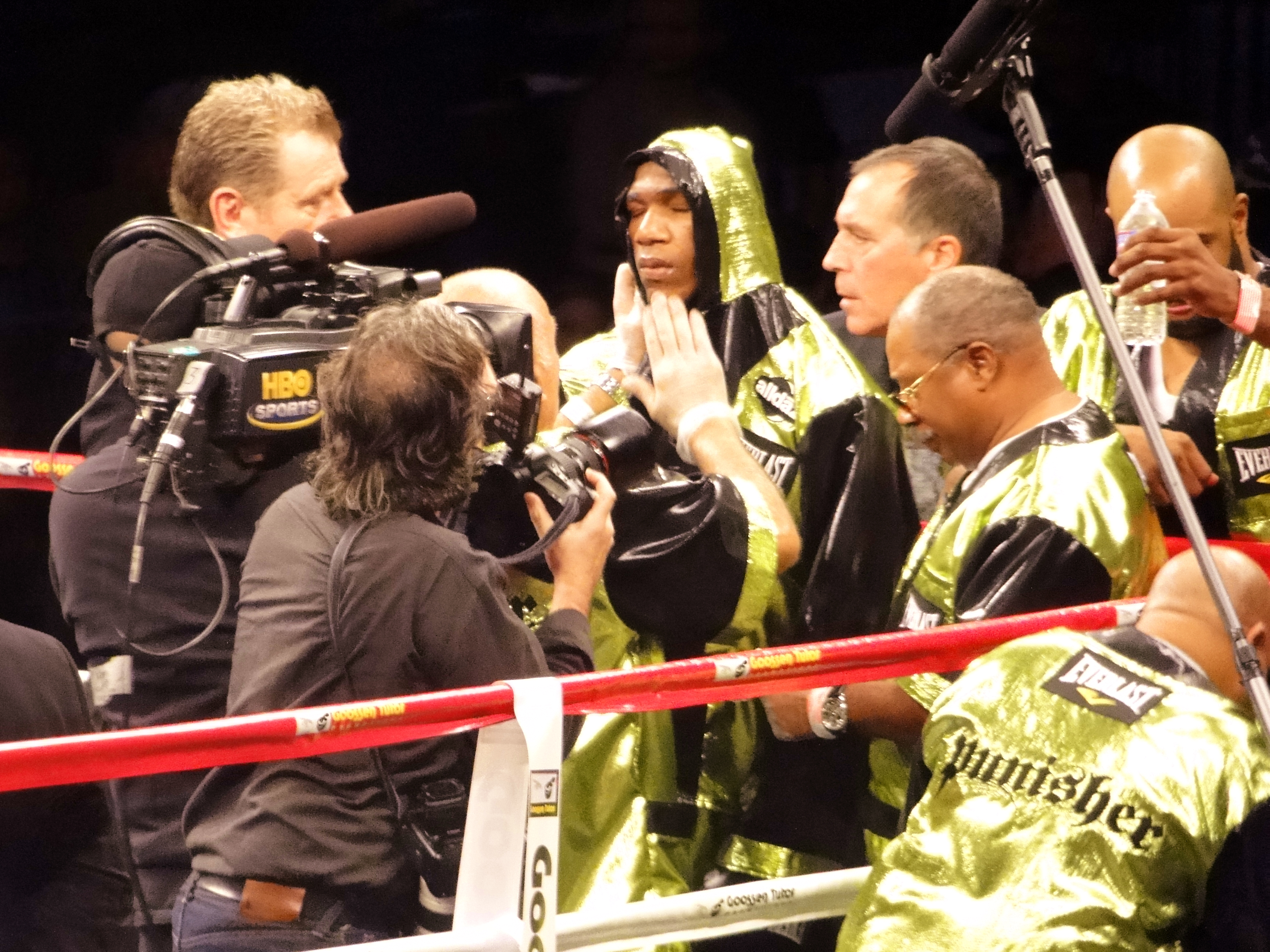
Williams before the Martínez fight in November 2010

A highly anticipated rematch with Sergio Martinez eventually materialized at Boardwalk Hall, Atlantic City, New Jersey on November 20, 2010. Upon the Williams camp's insistence, the fight was contested at the catchweight limit of 158 pounds instead of the middleweight limit of 160, with Martinez's WBC Middleweight title on the line. The fight was billed as a potential "fight-of-the-year," however the fight ended abruptly and dramatically when Sergio Martínez delivered a knockout blow with 2:02 left in the 2nd round. The punch was a short left cross that caught Williams right on the chin as he attempted to deliver a left-hand of his own. Williams' right hand was at his waist when the punch landed, rendering Paul Williams unconscious upon contact.

=== Erislandy Lara ===
On July 9, 2011, Paul Williams fought in a light middleweight contest in Atlantic City against former Cuban amateur sensation Erislandy Lara. Throughout the fight, Lara repeatedly hit Williams with hard left hands and appeared to have won the fight convincingly in the eyes of the HBO crew and those sitting at ringside. However, the judges awarded Williams with a narrow majority decision, a highly controversial verdict that ultimately led to the suspension of the three judges by the New Jersey Athletic Control Board.

== Motorcycle accident and paralysis ==
On May 27, 2012, Williams was severely injured when he crashed his motorcycle in Georgia. He swerved to avoid hitting a car while traveling at about 75 mph on the motorcycle and was launched sixty feet. Witnesses say he landed on his head and his body "folded like a suitcase." The accident left him with part of his spinal cord severely bruised, paralyzing him from the waist down. Since it was bruised and not severed, it gives him a chance to regain sensation. The doctors told Williams the swelling could go down in a year or two, potentially giving him a chance of walking again. The accident came as Williams was preparing for his PPV main event against Canelo Álvarez on September 15. "I'm just chilling in a wheelchair because I got tired of walking," Williams said in an interview with Jim Gray on Showtime Championship Boxing on the day he was supposed to fight. "Whether I am walking or not walking, my game ain't over until the Lord takes my life."

== Professional boxing record ==
43 fights	41 wins	2 losses
By knockout	27	1
By decision	13	1
By disqualification	1	0

No.	Result	Record	Opponent	Type	Round, time	Date	Location	Notes
43	Win	41–2	Nobuhiro Ishida	UD	12	Feb 18, 2012	American Bank Center, Corpus Christi, Texas, U.S.	
42	Win	40–2	Erislandy Lara	MD	12	Jul 9, 2011	Boardwalk Hall, Atlantic City, New Jersey, U.S.	
41	Loss	39–2	Sergio Martínez	KO	2 (12), 1:10	Nov 20, 2010	Boardwalk Hall, Atlantic City, New Jersey, U.S.	For WBC and The Ring middleweight titles
40	Win	39–1	Kermit Cintrón	TD	4 (12), 3:00	May 8, 2010	Home Depot Center, Carson, California, U.S.	Split TD: Cintrón unable to continue after falling out of the ring
39	Win	38–1	Sergio Martínez	MD	12	Dec 5, 2009	Boardwalk Hall, Atlantic City, New Jersey, U.S.	
38	Win	37–1	Winky Wright	UD	12	Apr 11, 2009	Mandalay Bay Events Center, Paradise, Nevada, U.S.	
37	Win	36–1	Verno Phillips	TKO	8 (12), 3:00	Nov 29, 2008	Citizens Business Bank Arena, Ontario, California, U.S.	Won WBO interim junior middleweight title
36	Win	35–1	Andy Kolle	TKO	1 (10), 1:37	Sep 25, 2008	Soboba Casino, San Jacinto, California, U.S.	
35	Win	34–1	Carlos Quintana	TKO	1 (12), 2:15	Jun 7, 2008	Mohegan Sun Arena, Montville, Connecticut, U.S.	Won WBO welterweight title
34	Loss	33–1	Carlos Quintana	UD	12	Feb 9, 2008	Pechanga Resort & Casino, Temecula, California, U.S.	Lost WBO welterweight title
33	Win	33–0	Antonio Margarito	UD	12	Jul 14, 2007	Home Depot Center, Carson, California, U.S.	Won WBO welterweight title
32	Win	32–0	Santos Pakau	TKO	6 (10), 2:16	Nov 4, 2006	Mandalay Bay Events Center, Paradise, Nevada, U.S.	
31	Win	31–0	Sharmba Mitchell	KO	4 (12), 2:57	Aug 19, 2006	Events Center, Reno, Nevada, U.S.	Retained WBC–USNBC and WBO–NABO welterweight titles
30	Win	30–0	Walter Matthysse	TKO	10 (12), 1:56	May 27, 2006	Home Depot Center, Carson, California, U.S.	Won vacant WBO–NABO welterweight title
29	Win	29–0	Sergio Rios	KO	2 (10), 2:24	Apr 12, 2006	Tachi Palace Hotel & Casino, Lemoore, California, U.S.	Won WBC–USNBC welterweight title
28	Win	28–0	Alfonso Sanchez	KO	5 (10), 1:12	Dec 2, 2005	Tachi Palace Hotel & Casino, Lemoore, California, U.S.	
27	Win	27–0	Marteze Logan	UD	8	Sep 30, 2005	Cache Creek Casino Resort, Brooks, California, U.S.	
26	Win	26–0	Terrance Cauthen	UD	10	Apr 22, 2005	Chumash Casino Resort, Santa Ynez, California, U.S.	
25	Win	25–0	Sammy Sparkman	TKO	4 (8)	Nov 11, 2004	Hilton, Washington, D.C., U.S.	
24	Win	24–0	Javier Hector Valadez	TKO	1 (10), 1:08	Sep 23, 2004	HP Pavilion, San Jose, California, U.S.	
23	Win	23–0	Luis Hernandez	UD	10	May 7, 2004	Foxwoods Resort Casino, Ledyard, Connecticut, U.S.	
22	Win	22–0	Rodolfo Gomez	TKO	4 (10), 2:43	Feb 6, 2004	Desert Diamond Casino, Tucson, Arizona, U.S.	
21	Win	21–0	Arturo Rodriguez	KO	1 (8)	Nov 7, 2003	Desert Diamond Casino, Tucson, Arizona, U.S.	
20	Win	20–0	Benjie Marquez	DQ	3 (6)	Aug 26, 2003	Sandia Casino, Albuquerque, New Mexico, U.S.	Marquez disqualified for hitting after the bell
19	Win	19–0	Earl Jackson	TKO	2 (6), 2:52	Jan 3, 2003	Thunderbird Wild West Casino, Norman, Oklahoma, U.S.	
18	Win	18–0	Joshua Onyango	UD	6	Oct 18, 2002	HSBC Arena, Buffalo, New York, U.S.	
17	Win	17–0	Gary Grant	TKO	2 (6)	Jul 27, 2002	Jarrell's Boxing Gym, Savannah, Georgia, U.S.	
16	Win	16–0	Laatekwei Hammond	UD	6	Apr 5, 2002	Alumni Arena, Buffalo, New York, U.S.	
15	Win	15–0	Agustin Silva	UD	4	Jan 4, 2002	American Airlines Arena, Miami, Florida, U.S.	
14	Win	14–0	Mahan Washington	TKO	3 (6), 1:44	Dec 7, 2001	Fantasy Springs Resort Casino, Indio, California, U.S.	
13	Win	13–0	Willie McDonald	TKO	1 (6)	Sep 29, 2001	Jarrell's Boxing Gym, Savannah, Georgia, U.S.	
12	Win	12–0	Robert Muhammad	TKO	5	Aug 25, 2001	Savannah, Georgia, U.S.	
11	Win	11–0	Rhon Roberts	TKO	4	Jul 3, 2001	Six Flags Over Georgia, Atlanta, Georgia, U.S.	
10	Win	10–0	Miguel Aquila	TKO	3	Mar 31, 2001	Augusta, Georgia, U.S.	
9	Win	9–0	Henry Hawkins	TKO	1	Jan 27, 2001	Augusta, Georgia, U.S.	
8	Win	8–0	Miguel Aquila	TKO	2	Dec 14, 2000	Columbus, Georgia, U.S.	
7	Win	7–0	Rohan Nanton	TKO	1	Dec 9, 2000	Charlotte, North Carolina, U.S.	
6	Win	6–0	Eleser Ortega	TKO	1	Oct 28, 2000	Jarrell's Boxing Gym, Savannah, Georgia, U.S.	
5	Win	5–0	James Young	TKO	3	Oct 19, 2000	Columbus, Georgia, U.S.	
4	Win	4–0	Adrian McNeil	KO	1	Sep 30, 2000	Augusta, Georgia, U.S.	
3	Win	3–0	Richard Burns	KO	1 (4), 1:56	Aug 18, 2000	Southeastern Livestock Pavilion, Ocala, Florida, U.S.	
2	Win	2–0	Matt Hill	TKO	1	Aug 1, 2000	Washington, D.C., U.S.	
1	Win	1–0	Jeremy Mickelson	PTS	4	Jul 21, 2000	Coliseum Complex, Greensboro, North Carolina, U.S.	

Sporting positions
Regional boxing titles
New title	WBC–USNBC welterweight champion April 12, 2006 – November 2006; Vacated	Vacant Title next held by Joaquin Zamora
Vacant Title last held by Mark Suárez	WBO–NABO welterweight champion May 27, 2006 – November 2006; Vacated	Vacant Title next held by Shamone Alvarez
World boxing titles
Preceded by Antonio Margarito	WBO welterweight champion July 14, 2007 – February 9, 2008	Succeeded by Carlos Quintana
Preceded by Carlos Quintana	WBO welterweight champion June 7, 2008 – November 12, 2008; Vacated	Vacant Title next held by Miguel Cotto
New title	WBO junior middleweight champion Interim title November 29, 2008 – November 7, 2009; Vacated	Vacant Title next held by Alfredo Angulo
