= Sergio Martínez vs. Matthew Macklin =

Boxing competition

Get Your Irish Up
- Date: March 17, 2012
- Venue: Theater at Madison Square Garden, New York City, New York US
- Title(s) on the line: The Ring middleweight championship

Tale of the tape
Boxer	(Argentina) Sergio Martínez	(Republic of Ireland) / (United Kingdom) Matthew Macklin
Nickname	"Maravilla"	"Mack The Knife"
Hometown	Quilmes, Buenos Aires, Argentina	Birmingham, West Midlands, UK
Purse		$1,500,000
Pre-fight record	48–2–2 (27 KO)	28–3 (19 KO)
Age	37 years	29 years, 10 months
Height	5 ft 10 in (178 cm)	5 ft 10 in (178 cm)
Weight	157 1/2 lb (71 kg)	158 lb (72 kg)
Style	Orthodox	Orthodox
Recognition	The Ring; Middleweight Champion; IBF; No. 4 Ranked Middleweight; The Ring No. 3 ranked pound-for-pound fighter 2-division world champion	WBC; No. 1 Ranked Middleweight; The Ring; No. 3 Ranked Middleweight; WBA; No. 7 Ranked Middleweight; WBO; No. 10 Ranked Middleweight

Result
- Martínez defeated Macklin by 11th round RTD

Sergio Martínez vs. Matthew Macklin, billed as Get Your Irish Up, is a boxing middleweight bout for The Ring world title and universally recognized middleweight championship of the world. The bout was held on March 17, 2012, at the Theater at Madison Square Garden in New York, New York, United States.

The fight was televised live on HBO World Championship Boxing.

== Background ==
=== Martínez ===
During a press conference in his native Argentina on December 29, Martínez renounced his WBC "Diamond" belt and indicated he might pursue a relationship with Showtime over HBO, as he felt HBO mistreated him.

Martínez was forced to give up his WBC belt for fighting Sergei Dzinziruk in March on HBO, a bout Martínez won by an eighth-round KO. The WBC then elevated Sebastian Zbik to the status of full champion and mandated that Zbik face Julio Cesar Chavez Jr., who dethroned Zbik in June.

Martínez was rated No. 3 in THE RING's pound for pound list and was coming off an 11th-round knockout of Darren Barker in October.

=== Macklin ===
In his last fight in June, Macklin lost a controversial split-decision to RING No. 2-rated middleweight and WBA belt holder Felix Sturm, of Germany.

Sturm recently held on to his crown, yet again, with a split-draw against rated middleweight Martin Murray on Dec. 2.

== The fight ==
Martínez would struggle throughout the first half of the fight, with Macklin able which neutralized much of Sergio's offensive attack. Macklin would score a knockdown on Martínez in the seventh round. Martínez was able to turn the tide in the later rounds, finding his range with his left hand. After scoring two knockdowns in the 11th, Macklin's corner stopped the fight shortly before the 12th round.

== Aftermath ==
Martínez would sign to face WBC titleholder Julio César Chávez Jr., despite Chávez's godfather Jose Sulaiman attempting to block the bout.

== Main card ==
Confirmed bouts:

- Middleweight Championship (Argentina) Sergio Martínez vs. (United Kingdom) Matthew Macklin
- Super Middleweight bout (Dominican Republic) Edwin Rodriguez vs. (United States) Don George

=== Preliminary card ===
- Heavyweight Bout (Russia) Magomed Abdusalamov vs. (Brazil) Raphael Zumbano Love

== Broadcasting ==
Country / Region	Broadcaster
Argentina	TyC Sports
Australia	Main Event
Canada	Canal Indigo
Hungary	Sport 1
Philippines	AKTV
Romania	Sport.ro
United Kingdom	Sky Sports
United States	HBO

Preceded by vs. Darren Barker	Sergio Martínez's bouts March 17, 2012	Succeeded by vs. Julio César Chávez Jr.
Preceded by vs. Felix Sturm	Matthew Macklin's bouts March 17, 2012	Succeeded by vs. Joachim Alcine
