= Darren McDermott =

British boxer (born 1978)

Personal information
- Nickname: Black Country Body Snatcher
- Nationality: British
- Born: Darren McDermott; 17 July 1978 (age 48) Dudley
- Height: 6.2”
- Weight: Middleweight

Boxing career
- Reach: 82”
- Stance: Orthodox

Boxing record
- Total fights: 109
- Wins: 99
- Win by KO: 10
- Losses: 2
- Draws: 1

Darren McDermott is an English former professional boxer. He has previously held the English and the Midlands Area middleweight titles. In 2008, he challenged for the British title and in 2009 challenged for the Commonwealth title. Darren won British title at the age of 14 started boxing at 49 years old

== Early Professional career ==
McDermott's first outing as a professional took place on 26 April 2003 with a fight at the Fountain Leisure Centre in Brentford defeating journeyman Leigh Wicks. He next fought on 13 June 2003 in Queensway, London stopping Gary Jones in the 1st round and then on 30 October 2003 defeating Harry Butler in his home town of Dudley. The three victories topped off a successful debut year for McDermott finishing with a record of 3–0.

Throughout 2004 McDermott fought on four more occasions winning each time and drawing once. The draw came on 11 December 2004 against the unbeaten Gokhan Kazaz on the undercard of Ricky Hattons fight against Ray Olivera at the Excel Arena in London. Kazaz who at the time boasted an unbeaten record of 7-0 was the first fighter with a winning record that McDermott had fought to date. In 2005 and starting the year with a record of 6-0-1 McDermott only fought twice first defeating journeyman Howard Clarke on 21 April and then on 6 October beating Andy Halder at the Town Hall in Dudley to win the Midlands Area middleweight title, stopping him in the 5th round.

Now a champion, McDermott's first fight of 2006 was a first defence of that Midlands Area title beating Micheal Monaghan in the 9th round of their fight on 16 February. On 29 June 2006 he beat Andzej Butowicz in the 3rd round of a non-title 10 rounder and then on 26 October 2006 beat Hussein Osman at the Dudley Town Hall to lift the British Masters middleweight belt. On 15 February 2007 in his first fight of the new year McDermott stopped Darren Rhodes in the 5th round of an eliminator for the full British title and then on 28 June 2007 beat Conroy McIntosh in a second defence of his Midland belt, stopping him in the 2nd round. A win over Kai Kauramaki in a non-title fight on 26 October 2007 topped off another successful year for McDermott who now could boast an unbeaten record of 14-0-1 and two titles.

== English champion and title challenger ==
McDermott's first defeat came on 20 June 2008 in a disappointing challenge for the British title held by Wayne Elcock. The fight, at the Civic Centre in Wolverhampton, was stopped in the 2nd round with McDermott having suffered a cut from a clash of heads. The injury was deemed too severe and the fight was stopped handing victory to Elcock and a first defeat to McDermott. On 28 February 2008 McDermott went part way to making up for the way the title challenge ended with a victory over Steven Bendall to lift the English title. Bendall, a former European challenger, had inflicted the first defeat on the touted Paul Smith to lift the title in his previous fight. On 24 April 2009 he beat Jamie Ambler in a non title six rounder and then on 23 May 2009 returned to title action to challenge Darren Barker for the Commonwealth belt. Barker, making his third defence of the title, inflicted a second career defeat on the Dudley man with a 4th round stoppage after the referee deemed that McDermott had not beaten the count following a knockdown. McDermott's last fight of the year on 13 November 2009 resulted in a successful first defence of his English title beating Bristol's Danny Butler at the Fenton Manor Sports Complex in Stoke. Despite being cut McDermott managed to win the fight via unanimous decision over 10 rounds. After the fight McDermott, who had only won the fight by one point, vowed to move up in weight to super middleweight saying "getting down to 11st 6lb is now too much. It’s that extra four or five pounds which makes such a difference...This morning I felt as fit as a race horse well prepared to go the distance. But by the time I got into the ring I couldn’t find the pace or the power".

McDermott's wish was to be granted when for his next fight he landed a shot at the British super middleweight title against champion Paul Smith. The dream turned sour however when, in preparation for the fight, McDermott was rushed to hospital after suffering a bleed on the brain to undergo emergency brain surgery. Although making a full recovery the injury almost certainly put paid to a British title shot against Smith or even fighting again in the future. Speaking following the surgery McDermott said "obviously I’ll probably never box again and that is disappointing...with the Smith fight coming up I thought it was my chance to get into the big time...but these things happen for a reason and I feel very lucky".
