= Darren Barker =

British boxer (born 1982)

Personal information
- Nickname: Dazzling
- Nationality: British
- Born: 19 May 1982 (age 44) Chipping Barnet, London, England
- Height: 6 ft 0 1/2 in (184 cm)
- Weight: Middleweight

Boxing career
- Reach: 73 in (185 cm)
- Stance: Orthodox

Boxing record
- Total fights: 28
- Wins: 26
- Win by KO: 16
- Losses: 2
Medal record
Men's amateur boxing
Representing England
Commonwealth Games
Gold medal – first place	2002 Manchester	Light-welterweight

Darren Barker (born 19 May 1982) is a British former professional boxer who competed from 2004 to 2013. He held multiple titles at middleweight, including the IBF world title in 2013; the Commonwealth title from 2007 to 2009; the British title in 2009; and the European title from 2010 to 2011. As an amateur, Barker represented England at the 2002 Commonwealth Games and won a gold medal in the light-welterweight division.

== Amateur career ==
Barker started his boxing career at a young age, he trained at Finchley and District Amateur Boxing club in New Barnet where he was trained by Jimmy Oliver (father of former European Champion Spencer Oliver) amongst others. After a successful and long period at the club, Barker decided to move on to further his boxing skills and begun training at the Repton Boys Club in Bethnal Green, there he was trained by the highly regarded boxing coach, Tony Burns. Darren's father, Terry, was also a successful amateur boxer at Repton, winning the ABA Championships in 1981. In 2002 Barker won the Commonwealth Games Gold medal at the championships held in Manchester. He also became a Multi nations Champion and Class C NABC Champion. Prior to the decision to turn professional Barker's amateur record stood at 68 fights, 55 wins and 13 losses.

== Professional career ==
Barker's first outing as a professional took place on 24 September 2004 with a fight at the Ice Arena in Nottingham defeating journeyman Howard Clarke. He next fought on 12 November 2004 at the Conference center in Wembley stopping David White in the 2nd round ensuring that his debut year as a professional was an unbeaten one.

Throughout 2005 Barker fought on five more occasions winning each time and then kept busy in 2006 with another seven contests winning all of them. One notable contest during that year took place on 15 September 2006 and was for the Southern Area Middleweight title with Barker beating Hussein Osman at the Alexandra Palace in Wood Green. Other notable victories that year included wins over Danny Thornton in May and Paul Samuels in December. A successful start to his career was then violently curtailed when on 10 December 2006 Barker received the news that his brother Gary, also a boxer, had been killed in a car accident. Following the accident Darren decided to take a break from boxing eventually returning to the ring on 5 October 2007 with a win over Greg Barton at the York Hall.

=== Commonwealth champion ===
On 14 November 2007 Barker fought for his first major title, the vacant Commonwealth Middleweight belt. His opponent, the undefeated Australian Ben Crampton had won 20 fights to date with only one draw. Barker won the fight at the York Hall by unanimous decision over 12 rounds to lift the title. His first defence saw him beat former British & European title challenger Steve Bendall with a seventh round stoppage. Barker then travelled to Canada in August 2008 and beat local man Larry Sharpe, a former Canadian champion and Commonwealth challenger, in a non-title fight over 10 rounds. On 13 December 2008, Barker defended his title for the second time against Northern Ireland's Jason McKay forcing him to retire at the end of round six. Barker's third defence of the title took place on 23 May 2009 against Dudley's Darren McDermott in a fight which was also billed as a British title eliminator. The fight which was held at the Watford Colosseum ended with a fourth round stoppage for the champion.

=== British champion ===
On 28 November 2009 Barker defeated Danny Butler, at the Brentwood Centre in Brentwood to lift the vacant British Middleweight title with the fight also doubling as a fourth defence of his Commonwealth crown. The original opponent for the fight Wayne Elcock, a former champion, had withdrawn due to a stomach virus meaning that Butler had come into the contest at short notice. Barker's class showed, and the referee called a stop to the fight in round 7 deciding that Butler, who had recently lost to Darren McDermott in a challenge for the English title, was in no position to continue.

=== European champion ===
On 9 April 2010 Barker claimed the European title with a unanimous points victory over Affif Belghecham of France. The shot at the European belt was unexpected following the surprise vacating of the title by previous holder Matthew Macklin who had hopes of pursuing World title ambitions. The fight against Belghecham, the reigning French and EU champion, proved to be the toughest of his career so far with the Frenchman pushing Barker all the way. Barker, now the holder of three championship belts, decided to vacate the Commonwealth title and set his sights upon defending the British and European belts against Matthew Macklin, whose world title ambitions did not materialise, later in the year in an eagerly anticipated fight dubbed the 'Battle of Britain'. The fight was to be one of the showcases of Frank Warrens 'Magnificent Seven' boxing event to be shown live on SKY PPV on 18 September 2010. The fight however had to be called off following the re-occurrence of a hip injury whilst sparring for the contest meaning that Barker had to pull out of the contest and relinquish the title. Barkers trainer Tony Sims said of the decision to pull him out of the fight "Everyone knows he had a hip operation a few months back and the day before yesterday (31 August 2010) he broke down for a second time. A few weeks ago is when it first happened I gave him five days off, but it went again this week midway through when he was sparring Danny Cadman...He asked for a few more days off but how long do you keep doing that for?." Barker's would be opponent Matthew Macklin eventually won the now vacant title fight following a 6th round win over Georgia's late replacement Shalva Jomardashvili.

==== Two-time European champion ====
On 1 May 2011 Barker regained the now vacant European middleweight title with a points win over Italy's Domenico Spada at the Olympia in London after over 12 months away from the ring. The Londoner was declared the winner after the judges scored the contest 115–113 and 116–113 after 12 rounds. Prior to the fight Barker spoke of his excitement at returning to the ring following his hip injury saying "I'm really excited about it and eager to show the general public what I'm made of" he added "training has gone well. [I've] been out for a year now, and I'm really looking forward to getting back in there." The fight also represented Barker's first outing with his new representatives Matchroom Sport after splitting from long time promoter Mick Hennessey, Barker described teaming up with Barry and Eddie Hearn at Matchroom as the "best thing to do" and said that he felt moving promoters would "benefit my career."

=== Middleweight world title attempt ===
On 1 October 2011 Barker fought Argentinian Sergio Martínez for the WBC Diamond Middleweight title at the Boardwalk Hall in Atlantic City. Martinez, in his previous encounters, had worked his way up to third in the pound for pound world rankings with victories over the likes of Kelly Pavlik, Paul Williams and Sergiy Dzinziruk. The fight resulted in another successful defence for Martinez as Barker suffered a first career defeat with an 11th-round knockout.

=== Rebuilding ===
On 9 March 2013, Darren Barker began a comeback by facing off against Italy's Simone Rotolo (34-3, 15 KO's) for the vacant IBF Inter-Continental Middleweight Title in the Wembley Arena in London. Barker scored a first round knockdown and went on to win the title as Rotolo retired with an injured hand in the fourth round.

=== IBF middleweight champion ===
On 17 August 2013, Barker challenged Australian Daniel Geale for Geale's IBF Middleweight world title. Despite being knocked down by his Australian opponent in the sixth round by a vicious body shot Barker battled back and won his first world title taking a split decision victory.

=== First title defence ===
In early Autumn 2013, it was announced by Eddie Hearn that Barker's first defense of the IBF Middleweight Title would be against veteran German boxer Felix Sturm at the Porsche-Arena, Stuttgart, Germany on 7 December 2013. Felix Sturm dropped and felled Barker twice in the second round before his corner threw in the towel, Barker having dislocated his hip from the first knockdown. Following the fight, Barker spoke about retirement due to a recurring hip injury, for which he had received surgery a few years earlier, and eventually in 2014 he announced his retirement from boxing.

== Professional boxing record ==
28 fights	26 wins	2 losses
By knockout	16	2
By decision	10	0

No.	Result	Record	Opponent	Type	Round, time	Date	Location	Notes
28	Loss	26–2	Felix Sturm	TKO	2 (12), 2:09	7 Dec 2013	Porsche-Arena, Stuttgart, Germany	Lost IBF middleweight title
27	Win	26–1	Daniel Geale	SD	12	17 Aug 2013	Revel, Atlantic City, New Jersey, US	Won IBF middleweight title
26	Win	25–1	Simone Rotolo	RTD	4 (12), 3:00	9 Mar 2013	Wembley Arena, London, England	Won IBF Inter-Continental middleweight title
25	Win	24–1	Kerry Hope	TKO	4 (12), 1:03	8 Dec 2012	London Olympia, London, England	
24	Loss	23–1	Sergio Martínez	KO	11 (12), 1:29	1 Oct 2011	Boardwalk Hall, Atlantic City, New Jersey, US	For The Ring middleweight title
23	Win	23–0	Domenico Spada	UD	12	30 Apr 2011	London Olympia, London, England	Won vacant European middleweight title
22	Win	22–0	Affif Belghecham	UD	12	9 Apr 2010	Alexandra Palace, London, England	Won vacant European middleweight title
21	Win	21–0	Danny Butler	TKO	7 (12), 0:47	28 Nov 2009	Brentwood Centre, Brentwood, Essex, England	Retained Commonwealth middleweight title; Won vacant British middleweight title
20	Win	20–0	Darren McDermott	TKO	4 (12), 2:30	23 May 2009	Brentwood Centre, Brentwood, Essex, England	Retained Commonwealth middleweight title
19	Win	19–0	Jason McKay	RTD	6 (12), 3:00	13 Dec 2008	Brentwood Centre, Brentwood, England	Retained Commonwealth middleweight title
18	Win	18–0	Larry Sharpe	UD	10	15 Aug 2008	River Cree Resort & Casino, Edmonton, Alberta, Canada	
17	Win	17–0	Steven Bendall	TKO	7 (12), 1:54	22 Feb 2008	York Hall, Bethnal Green, London, England	Retained Commonwealth middleweight title
16	Win	16–0	Ben Crampton	UD	12	14 Nov 2007	York Hall, Bethnal Green, London, England	Won Commonwealth middleweight title
15	Win	15–0	Greg Barton	TKO	3 (4), 1:14	5 Oct 2007	York Hall, Bethnal Green, London, England	
14	Win	14–0	Paul Samuels	KO	1 (8), 1:58	8 Dec 2006	Goresbrook Leisure Centre, London, England	
13	Win	13–0	Ojay Abrahams	RTD	2 (4)	24 Nov 2006	National Ice Centre, Nottingham, England	
12	Win	12–0	Hussain Osman	PTS	10	15 Sep 2006	Alexandra Palace, London, England	Won British Southern Area middleweight title
11	Win	11–0	Conroy McIntosh	TKO	7 (8)	12 Jul 2006	York Hall, London, England	
10	Win	10–0	Danny Thornton	KO	6 (8), 1:26	12 May 2006	York Hall, London, England	
9	Win	9–0	Louis Mimoune	TKO	2 (8), 2:51	17 Feb 2006	York Hall, London, England	
8	Win	8–0	Richard Mazurek	PTS	8	20 Jan 2006	York Hall, London, England	
7	Win	7–0	John Paul Temple	TKO	6 (6), 0:31	2 Dec 2005	National Ice Centre, Nottingham, England	
6	Win	6–0	Dean Walker	PTS	6	16 Jul 2005	Prince Regent Hotel, Chigwell, England	
5	Win	5–0	Ernie Smith	PTS	6	9 Jul 2005	National Ice Centre, Nottingham, England	
4	Win	4–0	Andrei Sherel	TKO	3 (6), 0:47	10 Apr 2005	Brentwood Centre, Brentwood, England	
3	Win	3–0	Leigh Wicks	RTD	4 (6), 2:00	26 Mar 2005	Hackney Empire, London, England	
2	Win	2–0	David White	TKO	2 (4), 2:37	12 Nov 2004	Wembley Conference Centre, London, England	
1	Win	1–0	Howard Clarke	PTS	6	24 Sep 2004	National Ice Centre, Nottingham, England	

Sporting positions
Regional boxing titles
Vacant Title last held by John Humphrey	Southern Area middleweight champion 15 September 2006 – November 2006; Vacated	Vacant Title next held by Steve Ede
Vacant Title last held by Howard Eastman	Commonwealth middleweight champion 14 November 2007 – April 2010; Vacated	Vacant Title next held by Martin Murray
Vacant Title last held by Matthew Macklin	British middleweight champion 28 November 2009 – April 2010; Vacated	Vacant Title next held by Martin Murray
Vacant Title last held by Matthew Macklin	European middleweight champion 9 April 2010 – 3 September 2010; Vacated	Vacant Title next held by Matthew Macklin
Vacant Title last held by Matthew Macklin	European middleweight champion 30 April 2011 – September 2011; Vacated	Vacant Title next held by Grzegorz Proksa
Vacant Title last held by Dominik Britsch	IBF Inter-Continental middleweight champion 9 March – 17 August 2013; Won world title	Vacant Title next held by Eamonn O'Kane
World boxing titles
Preceded by Daniel Geale	IBF middleweight champion 17 August 2013 – 7 December 2013	Succeeded by Felix Sturm
