= Andre Ward vs. Edwin Rodríguez =

Boxing competition

The Return
- Date: November 16, 2013
- Venue: Citizen's Business Bank Arena, Ontario, California, U.S.

Tale of the tape
Boxer	(United States) Andre Ward	(Dominican Republic) Edwin Rodríguez
Nickname	"S.O.G. (Son of God)"	"La Bomba"
Hometown	San Francisco, California, U.S.	Moca, El Cibao, Dominican Republic
Purse	$1,900,000	$1,000,000
Pre-fight record	26–0 (14 KO)	24–0 (16 KO)
Age	29 years, 8 months	28 years, 6 months
Height	6 ft 1 in (185 cm)	6 ft 0 in (183 cm)
Weight	168 lb (76 kg)	170 lb (77 kg)
Style	Orthodox	Orthodox
Recognition	WBA (Super), The Ring and TBRB; Super Middleweight Champion; The Ring No. 2 ranked pound-for-pound fighter	WBA; No. 3 Ranked Super Middleweight; TBRB; No. 6 Ranked Super Middleweight; The Ring; No. 7 Ranked Super Middleweight

Result
- Ward defeats Rodríguez via 12th round UD

Andre Ward vs. Edwin Rodríguez, billed as The Return, was a professional boxing match contested on November 16, 2013, for the WBA and The Ring super middleweight championship.

== Background ==
After defending his unified WBC, WBA, The Ring and TBRB super middleweight titles he had won in the Super Six Boxing Classic once in 2012, against Chad Dawson in September, Andre Ward was scheduled to make his second defence against former unified middleweight champion Kelly Pavlik on January 26, 2013, at the Galen Center in Los Angeles. However, an injury sustained by Ward originally postponed the bout for 4 weeks. The injury was more severe than originally thought and led to the cancellation of the fight as well as the subsequent retirement of Pavlik.

On March 23, the WBC stripped Ward of the WBC super-middleweight title belt for being inactive and for failing to face a mandatory challenger. Ward stated that he did not believe the WBC had the right to strip him of the world title because he was willing and able to defend it within the period specified by the WBC's rules. Wouls spend most of 2013 recovering from injuries and feuding with his promoter Dan Goossen, before signing to face unbeaten contender Edwin Rodríguez on 16 November, 14 months after the Dawson fight.

Rodríguez forfeited 20% of his career-high $1 million purse after weighing in 2 lbs over the super middleweight limit. As such Ward's world titles were no longer on the line.

== The fight ==
The fight started as roughhouse affair with much brawling on the inside until referee Jack Reiss penalized both fighters two points each and warning them that he would end the fight if it did not clean up. Ward went on to dominate the rest of the fight. The three judges scored the fight 118–106, 117–107, and 116–108 all in favour of Ward.

== Aftermath ==
After this win Ward spend the next 19 months inactive.

== Undercard ==
Confirmed bouts:

== Broadcasting ==
Country	Broadcaster
Hungary	Sport 1
Poland	Polsat
United Kingdom	BoxNation
United States	HBO

Preceded by vs. Chad Dawson	Andre Ward's bouts 16 November 2013	Succeeded by vs. Paul Smith
Preceded by vs. Denis Grachev	Edwin Rodríguez's bouts 16 November 2013	Succeeded by vs. Azea Augustama
