= Will Rosinsky =

American boxer (born 1984)

Personal information
- Nickname: Power
- Nationality: (United States) American
- Born: William M. Rosinsky; December 28, 1984 (age 41) Queens, New York
- Height: 5 ft 10 in (178 cm)
- Weight: Super Middleweight; Light Heavyweight

Boxing career
- Reach: 70 in (178 cm)
- Stance: Orthodox

Boxing record
- Total fights: 22
- Wins: 19
- Win by KO: 10
- Losses: 3
- Draws: 0

Will "Power" Rosinsky (born December 28, 1984) is a firefighter with the New York City Fire Department and a professional boxer hailing from Queens, New York.

== Amateur career ==
Rosinsky was a decorated amateur, winning the New York Golden Gloves four times, as well as the 2005 United States Amateur Champion at light heavyweight.

== Professional career ==
He successfully turned pro in 2008 with a first-round TKO over Valetine Fortanelly. On October 21, 2011, Rosinsky put his undefeated record on the line at MGM Theater, Foxwoods CT. He fought against Edwin "La Bomba" Rodriguez which ended in a controversial 100-90 (x3) decision in favor of Rodriguez. Rosinsky fought Kelly Pavlik on HBO Boxing After Dark on July 7, 2012 and lost by unanimous decision.

== Professional boxing record ==
22 fights	19 wins	3 losses
By knockout	10	0
By decision	9	3

No.	Result	Record	Opponent	Type	Round, time	Date	Location	Notes
22	Loss	19–3	(United States) Joe Smith Jr.	UD	10	2015-12-05	(United States) Barclays Center, Brooklyn, New York, USA	
21	Win	19–2	(United States) Dion Savage	UD	8	2015-05-30	(United States) Resorts World Casino, Queens, New York, USA	
20	Win	18–2	(United States) Paul Gonsalves	TKO	1 (8), 2:59	2015-03-14	(United States) Madison Square Garden Theater, New York City, New York, USA	
19	Win	17–2	(United States) Otis Griffin	UD	10	2012-12-19	(United States) Roseland Ballroom, New York City, New York, USA	
18	Loss	16–2	(United States) Kelly Pavlik	UD	10	2012-07-07	(United States) Home Depot Center, Carson, California, USA	
17	Win	16–1	(United States) Aaron Pryor Jr.	UD	8	2012-06-14	(United States) Roseland Ballroom, New York City, New York, USA	
16	Win	15–1	(United States) Zane Marks	TKO	3 (8), 1:26	2012-03-07	(United States) BB King Blues Club & Grill, New York City, New York, USA	
15	Loss	14–1	(Dominican Republic) Edwin Rodríguez	UD	10	2011-10-21	(United States) Foxwoods Resort Casino, Ledyard, Connecticut, USA	
14	Win	14–0	(United States) Jose Ramirez	TKO	1 (8), 2:20	2011-07-20	(United States) Oceana, Brooklyn, New York, USA	
13	Win	13–0	(United States) Yasin Rashid	UD	8	2010-11-20	(United States) Aviator Sports Complex, Brooklyn, New York, USA	
12	Win	12–0	(Puerto Rico) Angel David Gonzalez	TKO	3 (6), 3:00	2010-06-12	(United States) Madison Square Garden, New York City, New York, USA	
11	Win	11–0	(Dominican Republic) Ariel Espinal	UD	8	2010-04-15	(United States) Roseland Ballroom, New York City, New York, USA	
10	Win	10–0	(United States) Markus Gonzales	UD	4	2010-01-23	(United States) Madison Square Garden, New York City, New York, USA	
9	Win	9–0	(United States) Raynard Darden	UD	6	2009-09-18	(United States) PAL Gym, Yonkers, New York, USA	
8	Win	8–0	(United States) Alexander Mancera	MD	6	2009-06-05	(United States) Westbury Music Fair, Westbury, New York, USA	
7	Win	7–0	(United States) Andre Hemphill	UD	6	2009-05-08	(United States) Plattduetsche Park Restaurant, Franklin Square, New York, USA	
6	Win	6–0	(United States) James McAvey	TKO	1 (4), 1:48	2009-02-25	(United States) BB King Blues Club & Grill, New York City, New York, USA	
5	Win	5–0	(United States) Zeferino Albino	TKO	3 (4), 1:43	2009-01-23	(United States) Huntington Hilton Hotel, Melville, New York, USA	
4	Win	4–0	(United States) Lamar Foreman	KO	1 (4), 1:20	2009-01-10	(United States) Radisson Hotel, Columbia, South Carolina, USA	
3	Win	3–0	(Puerto Rico) Amador Acevedo	TKO	1 (4), 2:18	2008-12-04	(United States) Roseland Ballroom, New York City, New York, USA	
2	Win	2–0	(United States) Michael Ciccone	TKO	1 (4), 2:07	2008-09-26	(United States) Huntington Hilton Hotel, Melville, New York, USA	
1	Win	1–0	(United States) Valentine Fortanelly	KO	1 (4), 2:10	2008-08-06	(United States) BB King Blues Club & Grill, New York City, New York, USA	Professional debut.
