= Steve Foster (boxer) =

English boxer

Personal information
- Nickname: The Viking
- Nationality: English
- Born: Stephen C. Foster; 28 December 1960 (age 65) Salford, Greater Manchester, England
- Height: 5 ft 8 in (173 cm)
- Weight: Welterweight; Light middleweight Middleweight; Super middleweight

Boxing career
- Stance: Orthodox

Boxing record
- Total fights: 39
- Wins: 20 (KO 10)
- Losses: 17 (KO 7)
- Draws: 2

Steve "The Viking" Foster (born 28 December 1960 in Salford) is a retired English professional boxer of the 1980s and '90s who won the Commonwealth light middleweight title and IBF Inter-Continental light middleweight title, and was a challenger for the World Boxing Association (WBA) Inter-Continental light middleweight title against Shaun Cummins, BBBofC British light middleweight title against Robert McCracken, International Boxing Federation (IBF) Inter-Continental light middleweight title against Bahre Ahmeti, World Boxing Organization (WBO) light middleweight title against Ronald "Winky" Wright, BBBofC British middleweight title against Howard Eastman, World Boxing Federation (WBF) middleweight title against Cornelius Carr, and International Boxing Organization (IBO) middleweight title against Mpush Makambi, his professional fighting weight varied from 146 lb (66 kg; 10 st 6 lb), i.e. welterweight to 167 lb (76 kg; 11 st 13 lb), i.e. super middleweight.
