= Simeon Hardy =

Guyanese boxer and former box champion

Simeon Hardy, known professionally as "Candy Man", is a Guyanese boxer and a former World Boxing Council (WBC) Caribbean Boxing Federation (CABOFE) Welterweight Champion. Hardy finished his professional boxing career with a record of 14 wins and 2 losses, including 11 wins by knockout.

== Early life and amateur career ==
Simeon Hardy grew up in Sophia, a community in Georgetown, Guyana. He trained and competed at the Forgotten Youth Foundation (FYF) Gym throughout his amateur and early professional career under coach Sebert Blake.

== Professional boxing career ==
=== Early career (2010–2012) ===
Hardy made his professional debut on October 29, 2010, at the Cliff Anderson Sports Hall in Georgetown, defeating Patrick Boston by first-round knockout after approximately 20 seconds, reported at the time as the fastest knockout in South American boxing. By May 2012, seven of his eight professional wins had come by knockout, and he had the nickname of "Candy Man". In September 2012, Hardy entered the World Boxing Council's welterweight top 40 ranking at No. 38.

=== WBC CABOFE Championship ===
On January 27, 2012, Hardy won the vacant WBC Caribbean Boxing Federation (CABOFE) welterweight title by knocking out Iwan "Pure Gold" Azore in the ninth round at the Cliff Anderson Sports Hall. Later that year, he defeated former European and Commonwealth middleweight champion Howard Eastman in June and October. The second result was controversial, with contemporary reporting in Guyana Chronicle describing Hardy's performance as unimpressive.

=== United States career (2013–2018) ===
Hardy relocated to Brooklyn and pursued a professional career in the United States. In July 2013, a planned inaugural U.S. bout against former two-division world champion Joan "Little Tyson" Guzman in the WBC World Cup of Boxing was postponed and eventually cancelled.

In December 2013, Hardy signed an exclusive promotional contract with Banner Promotions.

He made his American debut in early 2014, stopping his opponent in five rounds. Between 2014 and 2015, Hardy fought at venues including the Barclays Center in Brooklyn and the Turning Stone Resort and Casino in upstate New York.

In February 2015, Hardy entered the Boxcino 2015 junior middleweight tournament, broadcast live on ESPN2's Friday Night Fights. In the quarterfinals, he suffered his first professional defeat, losing a six-round unanimous decision to Vito Gasparyan at the Mohegan Sun Casino in Uncasville, Connecticut, ending his unbeaten run of 13 fights.

After a period away from competition, Hardy returned to the ring on September 8, 2018, stopping Brandon Baue by TKO in the first round, bringing his professional record to 14 wins (11 by knockout) and 2 losses.

== Professional record ==
According to BoxRec, Hardy's record is as follows:

| Res. | Record | Opponent | Type | Rd. | Date | Location | Notes |
|---|---|---|---|---|---|---|---|
| Win | 14–2 | Brandon Baue | TKO | 1 | September 8, 2018 | Douglas County Fairgrounds, Lawrence, Kansas, USA | |
| Loss | 13–2 | Eric Moon | UD | | July 2017 | USA | |
| Loss | 13–1 | Vito Gasparyan | UD | 6 | February 13, 2015 | Mohegan Sun Casino, Uncasville, Connecticut, USA | ESPN Boxcino 2015 Tournament Quarterfinals Jr. Middleweight Division; broadcast on ESPN2 |
| Win | 13–0 | Malcolm Terry | TKO | | June 2014 | Barclays Center, Brooklyn, New York, USA | |
| Win | 12–0 | Rahman Mustafa Yusubov | TKO | | April 2014 | Turning Stone Resort & Casino, Verona, New York, USA | |
| Win | 11–0 | Chad Greenleaf | TKO | | February 2014 | Horseshoe Casino, Hammond, Indiana, USA | |
| Win | 10–0 | Howard Eastman | MD | | October 2012 | Thirst Park, Georgetown, Guyana | |
| Win | 9–0 | Howard Eastman | UD | | June 2012 | Cliff Anderson Sports Hall, Georgetown, Guyana | |
| Win | 8–0 | Mark Austin | TKO | | March 2012 | Cliff Anderson Sports Hall, Georgetown, Guyana | |
| Win | 7–0 | Iwan Azore | KO | | January 2012 | Cliff Anderson Sports Hall, Georgetown, Guyana | WBC CABOFE Welterweight Championship |
| Win | 6–0 | Julian Tannis | TKO | | October 2011 | Thirst Park, Ruimveldt, Guyana | |
| Win | 5–0 | Winston Pompey | KO | | September 2011 | Cliff Anderson Sports Hall, Georgetown, Guyana | |
| Win | 4–0 | Eversley Browne | KO | | June 2011 | Cliff Anderson Sports Hall, Georgetown, Guyana | |
| Win | 3–0 | Cassius Matthews | RTD | | March 2011 | Cliff Anderson Sports Hall, Georgetown, Guyana | |
| Win | 2–0 | Troy Lewis | UD | 4 | December 2010 | Cliff Anderson Sports Hall, Georgetown, Guyana | |
| Win | 1–0 | Patrick Boston | KO | 1 | October 29, 2010 | Cliff Anderson Sports Hall, Georgetown, Guyana | Pro debut; reported fastest KO in South America (~20 seconds) |

== Post-boxing career ==
Hardy became a coach after the end of his professional career. In 2022, he coached in New York City and announced The Coach Desk, a mobile application designed to connect independent boxing coaches and trainers with clients, operating on a marketplace model.

Hardy also launched Worksite Guyana, a marketplace to find construction workers in Guyana.
