= Don George (boxer) =

American boxer

Don 'Da Bomb' George (born Donovan Peter George) is a professional boxer who currently competes in the super middleweight division. He is a former USBA champion and currently resides in Chicago, Illinois. He is the former IBO Super Middleweight Champion, however his title reign would not be significant as his title was withdrawn from him due to a failed drug test. His professional record is 25–7–2 with 22 KO's and 2 NC's.

Don is a three time Chicago Golden Gloves Champion from 2001-2003 and is trained by father and Illinois Boxing Hall of Famer Peter George. Don won the IBO championship on August 23, 2014 at Chicago's US Cellular Field.

== Professional boxing record ==
36 fights	25 wins	7 losses
By knockout	22	3
By decision	3	4
Draws	2	
No contests	2	

No.	Result	Record	Opponent	Type	Round, time	Date	Location	Notes
36	Loss	25–7–2 (2)	Derrick Findley	KO	5 (8), 2:24	Jun 23, 2017	The Dome at Ballpark, Rosemont, Illinois, U.S.	
35	NC	25–6–2 (2)	Trevor McCumby	TKO	1 (8), 1:48	Nov 26, 2016	Cosmopolitan of Las Vegas, Paradise, Nevada, U.S.	Originally a TKO win for McCumby, as per NAC, later changed to no contest after McCumby's urine test revealed a presence of testosterone and testosterone metabolics on July 31, 2017
34	Loss	25–6–2 (1)	Lionell Thompson	UD	8	Sep 16, 2016	Cosmopolitan of Las Vegas, Paradise, Nevada, U.S.	
33	Loss	25–5–2 (1)	Sean Monaghan	UD	10	Oct 16, 2015	Aviator Sports Complex, Brooklyn, New York, U.S.	For WBC Continental Americas and vacant WBO-NABO light heavyweight titles
32	NC	25–4–2 (1)	Dyah Davis	UD	12	Aug 23, 2014	U.S. Cellular Field, Chicago, Illinois, U.S.	Vacant IBO super middleweight title at stake; Originally a UD12 win for George, changed to NC due to a failed drug test
31	Win	25–4–2	Troy Lowry	TKO	6 (6), 2:15	Apr 18, 2014	Horseshoe Casino, Hammond, Indiana, U.S.	
30	Loss	24–4–2	Caleb Truax	TKO	6 (10), 2:24	Jun 21, 2013	Convention Center, Minneapolis, Minnesota, U.S.	
29	Draw	24–3–2	David Alonso López	SD	10	Mar 22, 2013	UIC Pavilion, Chicago, Illinois, U.S.	
28	Win	24–3–1	James Cook	KO	1 (8), 1:15	Feb 1, 2013	UIC Pavilion, Chicago, Illinois, U.S.	
27	Win	23–3–1	Adonis Stevenson	TKO	12 (12), 0:55	Oct 12, 2012	Bell Centre, Montreal, Canada	IBF super middleweight title eliminator
26	Win	23–2–1	Dionisio Miranda	TKO	6 (10)	Aug 17, 2012	Buffalo Run Casino, Miami, Oklahoma, U.S.	
25	Loss	22–2–1	Edwin Rodríguez	UD	10	Mar 17, 2012	Madison Square Garden Theatre, New York City, New York, U.S.	
24	Win	22–1–1	Maxwell Taylor	TKO	8 (12), 2:05	Apr 1, 2011	UIC Pavilion, Chicago, Illinois, U.S.	Won vacant IBF-USBA super middleweight title
23	Win	21–1–1	Cornelius White	TKO	1 (10), 2:02	Feb 11, 2011	Bally's Atlantic City, Atlantic City, New Jersey, U.S.	
22	Loss	20–1–1	Francisco Sierra	TD	7 (10)	Jul 30, 2010	Buffalo Run Casino, Miami, Oklahoma, U.S.	Vacant WBO-NABO super middleweight title at stake; Unanimous TD
21	Win	20–0–1	Osumanu Adama	UD	8	Apr 30, 2010	UIC Pavilion, Chicago, Illinois, U.S.	
20	Win	19–0–1	Phil Williams	KO	3 (8), 2:43	Jan 29, 2010	UIC Pavilion, Chicago, Illinois, U.S.	
19	Win	18–0–1	Jason Naugler	TKO	4 (10), 2:26	Nov 6, 2009	UIC Pavilion, Chicago, Illinois, U.S.	
18	Win	17–0–1	Emmanuel Gonzales	TKO	4 (6), 0:53	Jul 31, 2009	Seminole Hard Rock Hotel and Casino, Hollywood, Los Angeles, California, U.S.	
17	Win	16–0–1	Mile Walthier	KO	1 (5), 1:45	May 1, 2009	Majestic Theatre, Detroit, Michigan, U.S.	
16	Win	15–0–1	Shay Mobley	TKO	3 (8), 2:33	Aug 4, 2007	Allstate Arena, Rosemont, Illinois, U.S.	
15	Win	14–0–1	Cory Phelps	TKO	1 (6), 1:14	Jun 14, 2007	Main Street Armory, Rochester, New York, U.S.	
14	Win	13–0–1	Alberto Mercedes	KO	1 (6), 2:59	Apr 13, 2007	Cicero Stadium, Cicero, Illinois, U.S.	
13	Win	12–0–1	Kendall Gould	TKO	1 (6), 1:00	Feb 16, 2007	Cicero Stadium, Cicero, Illinois, U.S.	
12	Win	11–0–1	William Johnson	TKO	4 (6), 2:19	Dec 22, 2006	Cicero Stadium, Cicero, Illinois, U.S.	
11	Win	10–0–1	Julio Jean	TKO	5 (6), 2:27	Nov 2, 2006	Chevrolet Centre, Youngstown, Ohio, U.S.	
10	Win	9–0–1	Joe Varela	KO	1 (6), 2:55	Jul 21, 2006	Aragon Ballroom, Chicago, Illinois, U.S.	
9	Win	8–0–1	Robert Smallwood	TKO	2 (6), 1:54	Jun 16, 2006	Cicero Stadium, Cicero, Illinois, U.S.	
8	Win	7–0–1	Julio Cesar Lanzas	UD	6	Oct 28, 2005	Orleans Hotel & Casino, Paradise, Nevada, U.S.	
7	Win	6–0–1	Allen Medina	TKO	5 (6), 2:59	Sep 23, 2005	Orleans Hotel & Casino, Paradise, Nevada, U.S.	
6	Win	5–0–1	Mack Willis	TKO	2 (6), 1:59	Jun 25, 2005	Aragon Ballroom, Chicago, Illinois, U.S.	
5	Win	4–0–1	Butch Hajicek	UD	5	Apr 8, 2005	Aragon Ballroom, Chicago, Illinois, U.S.	
4	Win	3–0–1	Ed Lee Humes	KO	1 (4), 2:22	Feb 25, 2005	Aragon Ballroom, Chicago, Illinois, U.S.	
3	Draw	2–0–1	Marcus Hicks	MD	4	Oct 15, 2004	Hawthorne Race Course, Cicero, Illinois, U.S.	
2	Win	2–0	Robert Smart	TKO	4 (4), 0:13	Sep 26, 2004	Majestic Star Casino, Gary, Indiana, U.S.	
1	Win	1–0	Nathan Wilkes	TKO	2 (4), 1:33	Sep 10, 2004	Hawthorne Race Course, Cicero, Illinois, U.S.	
