= Tony Dodson =

British boxer

Personal information
- Nickname: The Warrior
- Nationality: British
- Born: 2 July 1980 (age 46) Liverpool, England
- Height: 6 ft 0 1/2 in (184 cm)
- Weight: Super middleweight; Light heavyweight

Boxing career
- Stance: Orthodox

Boxing record
- Total fights: 41
- Wins: 32
- Win by KO: 15
- Losses: 8
- Draws: 1

Tony Dodson (born 2 July 1980) is a British former professional boxer who competed from 1999 to 2016. He held the British super middleweight title in 2003, and challenged for the Commonwealth super middleweight title in 2006 and the light heavyweight title in 2012.

== Professional career ==
=== Early professional career ===
Dodson made his professional contest on 31 July 1999 when he scored a stoppage win over Michael McDermott at the Sands Centre in Carlisle. One more fight that year on 2 October 1999 resulted in another victory, this time in Cardiff at the International Arena against Sean Pritchard meaning that at the end of his debut year Dodson was unbeaten in two fights. In the following two years Dodson would fight five times in 2000 and five times in 2001, winning on each occasion and padding his record out to 12–0 with the total including a win on 10 December 2001 against Joe Penn in Liverpool to lift the Central Area super middleweight title. Dodson started 2002 with a victory over Jason Hart at the Harvey Hadden Leisure Centre in Nottingham before losing for the first time in his career to Varuzhan Davtyan in Manchester on 9 March 2002 suffering a points defeat over six rounds to a boxer whose only previous professional contest was a defeat. He bounced back from this first career setback on 13 April 2002 to defeat Brian Barbosa, an American fighter with a record of 29 wins against 5 defeats at the Everton Park Sports Centre in Liverpool and followed that up with a win against Belgian boxer Mike Algoet on 7 September 2002 to lift the WBF Intercontinental super middleweight title once again fighting in Liverpool. He lost the title and the second fight of his career in his next contest on 26 October 2002 in Maesteg, Wales to the Polish boxer Albert Rybacki and one further attempt to retain the belt on 19 April 2003 also resulted in defeat this time to Frenchman, Pierre Moreno at the Everton Park Sports Center.

=== British and English titles ===
On 23 September 2003 Dodson met Varuzhan Davtyan, the man who had inflicted his first career defeat and gained revenge with a victory at The Pavilions in Plymouth. In his next fight Dodson traveled to the Kings Hall in Belfast to compete for the full British title, eventually beating Allan Foster via stoppage in the 11th round of their contest to lift the belt and become British champion. Following the fight, Dodson took a long lay off from boxing and didn't fight at all in 2004, only returning to the ring at the back end of 2005 with another victory over Varuzhan Davtyan on 23 September. Two more victories followed against international opposition before on 16 June 2006 Dodson met Jamie Hearn for the English super middleweight title. The fight, in Liverpool, resulted in a fifth round stoppage win for Dodson.

=== British title challenges ===
On 24 November 2006 Dodson lost for the fourth time in a challenge to Carl Froch, the reigning British and Commonwealth super middleweight champion. Both titles were on the line at the Ice Arena in Nottingham with Froch winning the fight in the third round via stoppage to retain his championships. Dodson returned to the ring on 6 July 2007 to defeat Nick Okoth in Wigan and then followed this up with wins over Yuri Tsarenka in Sheffield, traveling to Italy to defeat Mounir Sahli and returning to Sheffield to beat Nathan King. Finally on 28 March 2009 Dodson fought for the British super middleweight title for the third time only to lose in his challenge to Tony Quigley suffering his fifth career defeat at the Echo Arena in Liverpool. In his next fight on 12 March 2010 Dodson once more challenged for the title only to lose once more, this time to Paul Smith again at the Echo Arena.

=== Prizefighter series ===
Dodson chose to move up in weight to light heavyweight in order to compete in the Prizefighter series held at the Olympia in London on 29 January 2011. Pitched against Micheal Banbula in the quarter-finals, Dodson won the contest but suffered cuts above both eyes. In the semi-finals he stopped Menay Edwards in the third round only for the ringside doctor to rule him out of the final, where he would have fought Travis Dickinson, on safety concerns due to the extent of the injuries.
