= Tony Quigley =

British former professional boxer (born 1984)

Personal information
- Nationality: British
- Born: 1 October 1984 (age 41) Kirkby, Liverpool, England
- Height: 5 ft 10 in (178 cm)
- Weight: Super middleweight; Light heavyweight

Boxing career
- Stance: Orthodox

Boxing record
- Total fights: 16
- Wins: 13
- Win by KO: 6
- Losses: 2
- Draws: 1

Tony Quigley (born 1 October 1984) is a British former professional boxer who competed from 2004 to 2011. He held the British super middleweight title in 2009.

== Early professional career ==
Quigley's professional debut came on 26 February 2004 with a victory over David Pearson at the Kingsway Leisure Centre in Widnes. Over the next two years he won on six more occasions before on 14 October 2006 meeting fellow prospect Nathan Cleverly at the MEN Arena in Manchester. The fight was on the undercard to Joe Calzaghe's World title win against Sakio Bika and resulted in a career first loss for the Liverpudlian with Cleverly winning by stoppage in the 5th round of a six-round fight. Quigley returned to action early the following year defeating Dean Walker on 10 March 2007 at the Olympia in Liverpool. Only four fights over the next two years saw Quigley improve his record to 12-1 by the beginning of 2009.

== British champion ==
On 28 March 2009 Quigley fought fellow Liverpudlian Tony Dodson at the Echo Arena in Liverpool for the full British title and won in an "epic" battle with both fighters under pressure for large sections of the fight. Quigley finally settled matters in the 12th round when a right hand put Dodson down and despite getting back up again, in enough trouble to cause the referee to step in and stop the fight. His reign as champion did not last for long however, as in his first defence, the title was lost to another fighter from Liverpool, Paul Smith. The fight, a split decision, on 30 October 2009 once again took place in the city at the Echo Arena and was described as a "brutal" contest with promoter Frank Warren promising a rematch between the two fighters.
