= Sergio Martínez vs. Darren Barker =

Boxing competition

No Fear. No Mercy.
- Date: October 1, 2011
- Venue: Boardwalk Hall, Atlantic City, New Jersey, US
- Title(s) on the line: The Ring middleweight championship

Tale of the tape
Boxer	(Argentina) Sergio Martínez	(United Kingdom) Darren Barker
Nickname	"Maravilla"	"Dazzling"
Hometown	Quilmes, Buenos Aires, Argentina	Barnet, London, UK
Purse	$1,500,000	$400,000
Pre-fight record	47–2–2 (26 KO)	23–0 (14 KO)
Age	36 years, 7 months	29 years, 4 months
Height	5 ft 10 in (178 cm)	6 ft 0 in (183 cm)
Weight	158 lb (72 kg)	159 1/2 lb (72 kg)
Style	Southpaw	Orthodox
Recognition	The Ring; Middleweight Champion; IBF; No. 3 Ranked Middleweight; The Ring No. 3 ranked pound-for-pound fighter 2-division world champion	IBF; No. 2 Ranked Middleweight; WBC; No. 3 Ranked Middleweight; WBO; No. 6 Ranked Middleweight; EBU (European); Middleweight Champion

Result
- Martínez defeated Barker via 11th Round Knockout

Sergio Martínez vs. Darren Barker, billed as No Fear. No Mercy., was a professional boxing match contested on October 1, 2011, for The Ring middleweight championship.

== Background ==
Barker, the European champion, was certainly not the first choice for Martínez, various other potential opponents turned down overtures for a bout against him. Promoter Lou DiBella offered the fight with Martínez to titleholders Julio Cesar Chavez Jr. and Daniel Geale as well as junior middleweight titlist Miguel Cotto and Paul Williams, for a rubber match. Martínez said he was willing to face Cotto at middleweight or drop down to junior middleweight to fight him, but Cotto continued to ignore the fight.

=== Martínez ===
Martínez won two world titles in April 2010 with a unanimous decision over Kelly Pavlik. Martínez made his first defense in spectacular fashion on Paul Williams by knocking him unconscious with one punch. In his second defense, Martínez laid a beating on junior middleweight titlist Sergiy Dzinziruk, HBO's preferred opponent who moved up in weight for the opportunity. Martínez dropped him five times en route to a lopsided eighth-round knockout on March 12. And because Martínez faced Dzinziruk instead of mandatory challenger Sebastian Zbik (whom HBO rejected for Martínez but accepted for Chavez), the WBC stripped Martínez and elevated Zbik to its titleholder. Zbik then lost the belt to Chavez on June 4 by majority decision.

=== Barker ===
Barker won the vacant EBU middleweight title with a unanimous decision win over France's Affif Belghecham on April 9, 2010. However, he was then the victim of a cowardly street attack in June 2010 after he tried to prevent a scuffle. This event, coupled with a chronic hip-problem, left him inactive for over a year as he recovered from the assault and underwent hip surgery. Barker returned to ring on April 30, 2011, once again winning the vacant EBU middleweight crown with a hard-fought unanimous decision victory over Italy's Domenico Spada.

== The fight ==
Martínez defeated Barker via Knockout at 1:29 of the eleventh round. Barker had some success early in the fight, landing some jabs and a few straight rights that made Martínez's nose to bleed in the fourth round. But from the fifth round on, Martínez dominated the fight behind three- and four-punch flurries that left Barker covering up for most of the bout.

Through 10 rounds, judges Lynn Carter (96–94), Victor Loughlin (97–94) and Alejandro Roche (99–91) all had Martínez ahead.

== Undercard ==
Confirmed bouts:

=== Televised ===
- Middleweight bout: (Republic of Ireland) Andy Lee vs. (United States) Brian Vera

Lee defeated Vera via unanimous Decision (99-90, 98-91, 99-90)

=== Preliminary card ===
- Light Heavyweight bout: (Malawi) Isaac Chilemba vs. (New Zealand) Jameson Bostic

Chilemba defeated Bostic via Technical Knockout at 1:48 of the second round.

- Super Middleweight bout: (United States) Sean Monaghan vs. (United States) Kentrell Claiborne

Monaghan defeated Claiborne via Technical Knockout at 0:54 of the fourth round.

- Heavyweight bout: (Russia) Magomed Abdusalamov vs. (United States) Kevin Burnett

Abdusalamov defeated Burnett via Technical Knockout at 1:18 of the first round.

- Super Welterweight bout: (United States) Steve Martínez vs. (United States) Jay Krupp

Martínez defeated Krupp via Technical Knockout at 1:57 of the fifth round.

- Super Middleweight bout: (United States) J'Leon Love vs. (United States) Eddie Hunter

Love defeated Hunter via unanimous Decision (60-53, 60-54, 60-54)

- Super Welterweight bout: (United States) Boyd Melson vs. (United States) Russ Niggemyer

Melson defeated Niggemyer via unanimous Decision (59-55, 60-54, 60-53)

- Middleweight bout: (Panama) Israel Duffus vs. (United States) Troy Artis

Artis defeated Duffus via Technical Knockout at 2:03 of the third round.

- Super Welterweight bout: (United States) Kevin Rooney Jr vs. (United States) Danny Lugo

Lugo defeated Rooney via unanimous Decision (37-39, 37-39, 37-39)

== Broadcasting ==
Country / Region	Broadcaster
Argentina	TyC Sports
Australia	Main Event
Hungary	Sport 2
Mexico	Televisa
United States	HBO
United Kingdom	Sky Sports

Preceded by vs. Sergiy Dzinziruk	Sergio Martínez's bouts October 1, 2011	Succeeded by vs. Matthew Macklin
Preceded by vs. Domenico Spada	Darren Barker's bouts October 1, 2011	Succeeded by vs. Kerry Hope
