= Steve Bendall =

English boxer

Personal information
- Nationality: British
- Born: Steven Bendall; 1 December 1973 (age 52) Coventry, England
- Weight: Middleweight; Super middleweight; Light heavyweight; Cruiserweight

Boxing career
- Stance: Southpaw

Boxing record
- Total fights: 37
- Wins: 30
- Win by KO: 14
- Losses: 7
- Draws: 0
- No contests: 0

Steven Bendall (born 1 December 1973) is a British former professional boxer who competed from 1997 to 2013. He held the BBBofC English middleweight title twice in 2005 and 2008 and the IBO Inter-Continental middleweight title from 2001 to 2003.

Bendall boxed to national level as an amateur before turning professional in May 1997, winning his first fight at the Rivermead Leisure Centre, Reading, Berkshire, England, in which Bendall knocked out Hackney's Dennis Doyley on an undercard that included Junior Witter and Tony Booth.

Bendall's explosive knockout power led him to win his first 14 fights, the majority inside the distance, before he fought for his title fight when he took on Brendan Ingle trained Jason Collins in December 2001 for the WBU Intercontinental Middleweight Title. Bendall continued his winning streak beating Collins on points to win his first title as a professional. He then added the Vacant IBO Inter-Continental Middleweight Title in March 2002 when he knocked out Ukrainian Viktor Fessetchko.

His first defeat came in September 2004 when he lost to dangerous English fighter Scott Dann during his challenge for the Vacant British Middleweight Title. Bendall later won the English Middleweight Title but then lost it to Wayne Elcock. He has also challenged for the EBU European Middleweight Title losing in the 3rd round against Germany's Sebastian Sylvester and the Commonwealth Middleweight title losing to Darren Barker.

Bendall shot back up to title winning prominence when in June 2008 he defeated Liverpool's 2002 Commonwealth Games Silver medalist Paul Smith over 10 rounds in Birmingham. It was Smiths first defeat as a professional.

On 7 December 2013 in Neuwied, Germany, Bendall was given a chance to fight the dangerous Ghanaian John Akulugu for the vacant WBU Middleweight World Title and proceeded to stop him with a 6th-round KO. Akulugu who had won his last 9 fights all by KO was also down in round 2 and round 4. The same month Roy Jones Jr. took the WBU Cruiserweight World Title.
