= Sean Monaghan =

American professional boxer

Personal information
- Nickname: Seanie
- Nationality: American
- Born: Sean Monaghan; May 21, 1981 (age 45) Long Beach, New York, U.S.
- Height: 5 ft 11 in (180 cm)
- Weight: Light-heavyweight

Boxing career
- Reach: 72.5 in (184 cm)
- Stance: Orthodox

Boxing record
- Total fights: 32
- Wins: 29
- Win by KO: 17
- Losses: 3

Sean Monaghan (born May 21, 1981) is an American former professional boxer of Irish descent who competed in the light-heavyweight division from 2010 to 2019.

== Background ==
Before he was a professional boxer, he had a job as a bricklayer. His parents are from County Meath, Ireland.

== Amateur career ==
Monaghan had about 15 amateur fights.

Before deciding to join the pro ranks, Monaghan competed in the 2009 New York Golden Gloves competition, losing at the final on points to Joe Smith Jr., at Madison Square Garden.

== Professional career ==
=== Monaghan vs. Trigueno ===
Monaghan made his professional debut in his hometown. He faced Simeon Trigueno. A body shot sent Trigueno down to a knee for an eight count. He beat the count but was dropped again by a straight right hand to the head and was saved by the bell to end the round. The ringside doctor put an end to the bout citing an injury. Monaghan was credited with a first-round TKO.

=== Monaghan vs. Pietrantonio ===
Monaghan scored a fifth-round TKO over Anthony Pietrantonio in the Garden's WaMu Theatre on October 22, 2011.

=== Monaghan vs. Johnson ===
On June 14 in front of a capacity crowd at NY's Roseland Ballroom, Monaghan became the new WBC Continental Americas Light Heavyweight Champion with an 8th-round TKO over Romaro Johnson

Monaghan had been working on sharpening his technique with greater emphasis on speed, head movement and combination work as opposed to merely looking to land the devastating kill shot, although he still possesses a keen ability to score knockouts.

=== Monaghan vs. Cantrell ===
Monaghan appeared on the undercard of the WBO featherweight championship fight between Orlando Salido and challenger Mikey Garcia at Madison Square Garden Theater on January 19, 2013, where he defeated Roger Cantrell by unanimous decision in an eight-round fight.

=== Monaghan vs. Stanley ===
On the Donaire-Rigondeaux undercard on April 13, 2013 at The Radio City Music Hall, Monaghan scored a first-round knockout of journeyman Dion Stanley (overhand right). This knockout propelled his career, convincing Top Rank Boxing's Bob Arum to sign the popular fighter.

=== Monaghan vs. Barrera ===
Monaghan was defeated by Sullivan Barrera via unanimous decision in their 10-round contest on 3 November 2018. The scorecards were announced as 99–91, 99–91, 98–92 in favor of Barrera.

=== Monaghan vs. Johnson ===
In his next bout, Monaghan faced Callum Johnson, ranked #15 by the IBF at light heavyweight. Johnson beat Monaghan by technical knockout in the 3rd round.

== Professional boxing record ==
| 32 fights | 29 wins | 3 losses |
|---|---|---|
| By knockout | 17 | 2 |
| By decision | 12 | 1 |

| No. | Result | Record | Opponent | Type | Round, time | Date | Location | Notes |
|---|---|---|---|---|---|---|---|---|
| 32 | Loss | 29–3 | (United Kingdom) Callum Johnson | TKO | 3 (10), 0:23 | 9 Mar 2019 | (United States) Turning Stone Resort Casino, Verona, New York, U.S. | |
| 31 | Loss | 29–2 | (Cuba) Sullivan Barrera | UD | 10 | 3 Nov 2018 | (United States) Aviator Sports Complex, New York City, New York, U.S. | |
| 30 | Win | 29–1 | (Colombia) Evert Bravo | UD | 8 | 4 Nov 2017 | (United States) Barclays Center, New York City, New York, U.S. | |
| 29 | Loss | 28–1 | (United States) Marcus Browne | TKO | 2 (10), 0:40 | 15 Jul 2017 | (United States) Nassau Coliseum, Uniondale, New York, U.S. | |
| 28 | Win | 28–0 | (Mexico) Fernando Castañeda | UD | 10 | 10 Dec 2016 | (United States) CenturyLink Center, Omaha, Nebraska, U.S. | |
| 27 | Win | 27–0 | (Finland) Janne Forsman | TKO | 5 (10), 1:34 | 27 Feb 2016 | (United States) The Theater at Madison Square Garden, New York City, New York, U.S. | |
| 26 | Win | 26–0 | (United States) Donovan George | UD | 10 | 16 Oct 2015 | (United States) Aviator Sports Complex, New York City, New York, U.S. | Retained WBC Continental Americas light-heavyweight; Won vacant WBO NABO light-heavyweight title |
| 25 | Win | 25–0 | (Colombia) Fulgencio Zúñiga | TKO | 9 (10), 2:10 | 13 Jun 2015 | (United States) The Theater at Madison Square Garden, New York City, New York, U.S. | |
| 24 | Win | 24–0 | (Brazil) Cleiton Conceição | UD | 10 | 8 May 2015 | (United States) Prudential Center, Newark, New Jersey, U.S. | |
| 23 | Win | 23–0 | (Hungary) Daniel Regi | TKO | 3 (10), 2:52 | 13 Dec 2014 | (United States) Cosmopolitan of Las Vegas, Paradise, Nevada, U.S. | Retained WBC Continental Americas light-heavyweight title |
| 22 | Win | 22–0 | (Albania) Elvir Muriqi | UD | 10 | 14 Jun 2014 | (United States) Barclays Center, New York City, New York, U.S. | Retained WBC Continental Americas light-heavyweight title |
| 21 | Win | 21–0 | (United States) Joe McCreedy | TKO | 5 (10), 2:25 | 12 Apr 2014 | (United States) MGM Grand Garden Arena, Paradise, Nevada, U.S. | Retained WBC Continental Americas light-heavyweight title |
| 20 | Win | 20–0 | (United States) Matt Vanda | TKO | 1 (10), 2:51 | 25 Jan 2014 | (United States) The Theater at Madsion Square Garden, New York City, New York, U.S. | Retained WBC Continental Americas light-heavyweight title |
| 19 | Win | 19–0 | (United States) Anthony Caputo Smith | TKO | 3 (10), 2:39 | 12 Oct 2013 | (United States) Thomas & Mack Center, Paradise, Nevada, U.S. | Retained WBC Continental Americas light-heavyweight title |
| 18 | Win | 18–0 | (United States) Dion Stanley | TKO | 1 (8), 1:51 | 13 Apr 2013 | (United States) Radio City Music Hall, New York City, New York, U.S. | |
| 17 | Win | 17–0 | (United States) Roger Cantrell | UD | 8 | 19 Jan 2013 | (United States) The Theater at Madison Square Garden, New York City, New York, U.S. | |
| 16 | Win | 16–0 | (United States) Rayco Saunders | UD | 10 | 24 Oct 2012 | (United States) Roseland Ballroom, New York City, New York, U.S. | Retained WBC Continental Americas light-heavyweight title |
| 15 | Win | 15–0 | (United States) George Armenta | TKO | 3 (10), 2:25 | 2 Aug 2012 | (United States) Roseland Ballroom, New York City, New York, U.S. | |
| 14 | Win | 14–0 | (United States) Romaro Johnson | TKO | 8 (10), 2:30 | 14 Jun 2012 | (United States) Roseland Ballroom, New York City, New York, U.S. | Won vacant WBC Continental Americas light-heavyweight title |
| 13 | Win | 13–0 | (United States) Eric Watkins | UD | 6 | 17 Mar 2012 | (United States) The Theater at Madison Square Garden, New York City, New York, U.S. | |
| 12 | Win | 12–0 | (United States) Billy Bailey | UD | 8 | 21 Jan 2012 | (United States) Roseland Ballroom, New York City, New York, U.S. | |
| 11 | Win | 11–0 | (United States) Santos Martinez | KO | 2 (4), 2:56 | 3 Dec 2011 | (United States) Madison Square Garden, New York City, New York, U.S. | |
| 10 | Win | 10–0 | (United States) Anthony Pietrantonio | TKO | 5 (6), 2:51 | 22 Oct 2011 | (United States) The Theater at Madison Square Garden, New York City, New York, U.S. | |
| 9 | Win | 9–0 | (United States) Kentrell Claiborne | TKO | 4 (6), 0:54 | 1 Oct 2011 | (United States) Boardwalk Hall, Atlantic City, New Jersey, U.S. | |
| 8 | Win | 8–0 | (United States) Brian Bernard | KO | 1 (4), 1:29 | 30 Jul 2011 | (United States) Aviator Sports Complex, New York City, New York, U.S. | |
| 7 | Win | 7–0 | (United States) Michael Glenn | UD | 4 | 29 Mar 2011 | (United States) BB King Blues Club & Grill, New York City, New York, U.S. | |
| 6 | Win | 6–0 | (United States) Billy Cunningham | UD | 4 | 12 Mar 2011 | (United States) Foxwoods Resort Casino, Ledyard, Connecticut, U.S. | |
| 5 | Win | 5–0 | (United States) Angel Gonzalez | TKO | 3 (4) | 9 Feb 2011 | (United States) BB King Blues Club & Grill, New York City, New York, U.S. | |
| 4 | Win | 4–0 | (United States) Nick Whiting | TKO | 2 (4), 1:38 | 22 Oct 2010 | (United States) Capitale, New York City, New York, U.S. | |
| 3 | Win | 3–0 | (United States) Borngod Washington | MD | 4 | 6 Oct 2010 | (United States) BB King Blues Club & Grill, New York City, New York, U.S. | |
| 2 | Win | 2–0 | (United States) Dennis Penelton | KO | 1 (4), 1:19 | 17 Jul 2010 | (United States) Tropicana Casino & Resort, Atlantic City, New Jersey, U.S. | |
| 1 | Win | 1–0 | (United States) Simeon Trigueno | TKO | 1 (4), 3:00 | 21 May 2010 | (United States) Capitale, New York City, New York, U.S. | |
