= Magomed Abdusalamov =

Russian boxer (born 1981)

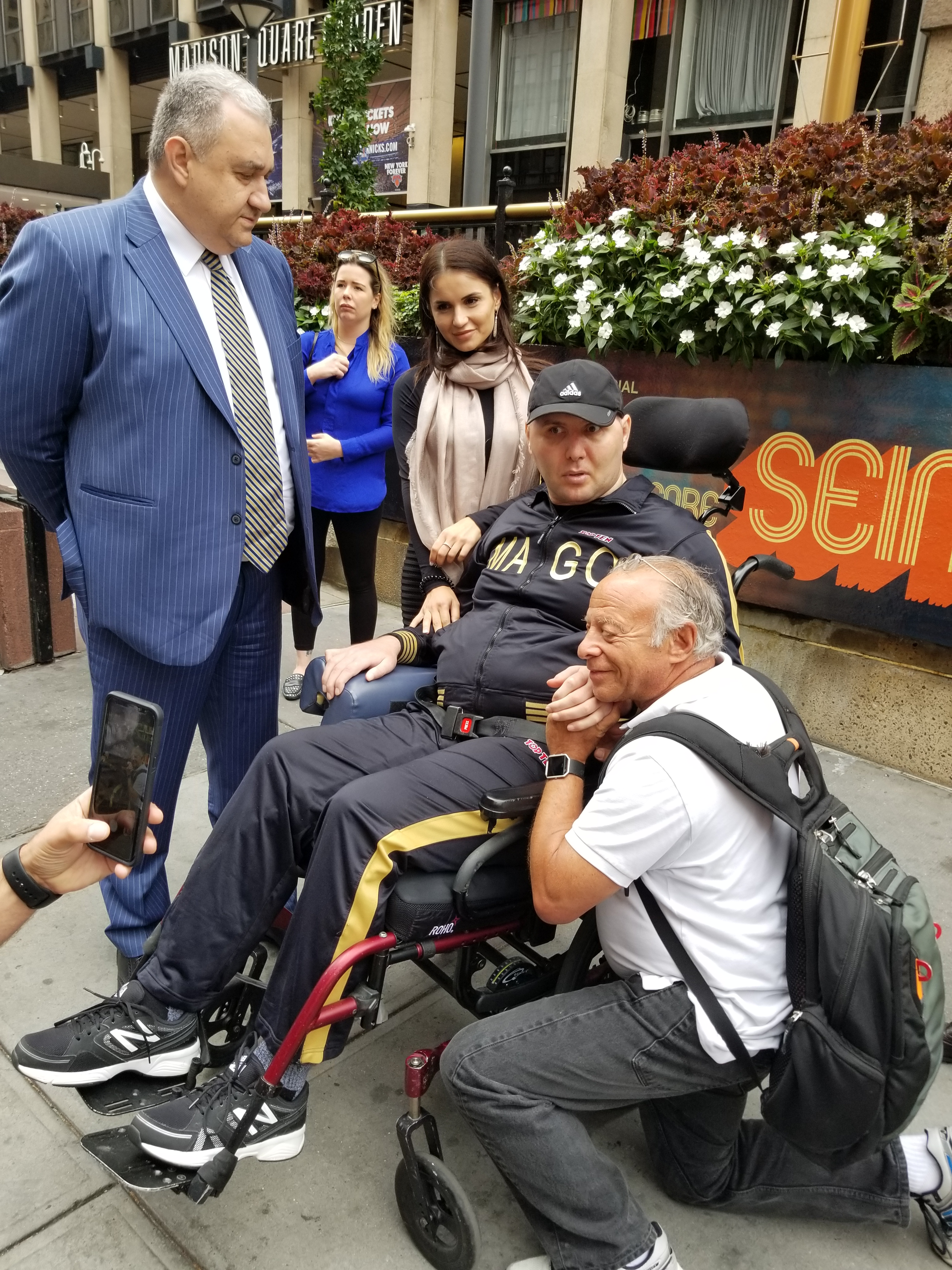
- Abdusalamov (in black) in 2017

Personal information
- Native name: Магомед Магомедгаджиевич Абдусаламов
- Nickname: Mago
- Nationality: Russian
- Born: 25 March 1981 (age 45) Makhachkala, Dagestan ASSR, Russian SFSR, Soviet Union
- Height: 1.85 m (6 ft 1 in)
- Weight: Heavyweight

Boxing career
- Stance: Southpaw

Boxing record
- Total fights: 19
- Wins: 18
- Win by KO: 18
- Losses: 1

Magomed Magomedgadzhiyevich Abdusalamov (Russian: Магомед Магомедгаджиевич Абдусаламов; born 25 March 1981) is a Russian former professional boxer who competed from 2008 to 2013. As an amateur he won the 2005 and 2006 Russian national championships in the super-heavyweight division. He turned professional in 2008, fighting nineteen times at heavyweight and winning his first eighteen by knockout. In 2013, Abdusalamov was forced to retire from the sport due to severe brain injuries sustained during his only career defeat.

== Early life ==
Magomed Abdusalamov was born in Dagestan's capital city of Makhachkala on 25 March 1981. He grew up in a strict Muslim household and was his parents' first male child. Growing up in a large family, from an early age his disciplinarian father pushed his son into sports as a way to shelter him from the growing violence and crime in the city.

== Amateur career ==
In spite of his success at the nationals 2005 and 2006, hard-punching southpaw Abdusalamov stood in the shadows of Islam Timurziev, who was regularly sent to international competitions ahead of him.

He did not qualify for the 2008 Olympics after losing to eventual bronze medalist David Price in a qualifier.

== Professional career ==
Abdusalamov turned pro in 2008 and won his first four bouts for Warriors boxing.

Of his nineteen professional fights he got eighteen wins, all by KO or TKO.

In September 2012, he was dropped hard by Jameel McCline in the first round, but won by TKO in the second round to win the vacant World Boxing Council United States Heavyweight title at Olympiyskiy in Moscow, Russia. He defended the USNBC title twice with stoppage wins in 2013, against Victor Bisbal in Atlantic City, New Jersey in March 2013, and Sebastian Ceballos in Buenos Aires, Argentina in April 2013.

On 2 November 2013, Abdusalamov took on Mike Perez in a 10-round fight for his title at Madison Square Garden in New York City as part of an HBO event featuring Gennady Golovkin in the main event. In a largely one-sided fight, which was scored seven rounds to three on two scorecards, Abdusalamov lost his title as Perez landed a bevy of power punches that the champion managed to withstand despite being cut late in the fight.

=== Brain injury ===
Abdusalamov was cleared of brain injury by Barry Jordan, Chief Medical Officer of the New York State Athletic Commission. Immediately afterwards, Abdusalamov took a taxi from Madison Square Garden to Roosevelt Hospital on the Upper West Side. The doctors who examined Abdusalamov found that he had sustained a large blood clot on his brain, in addition to the wear and tear he suffered during the course of the fight. Doctors put Abdusalamov into medically induced coma as a way to give the swelling in his brain time to subside. Shortly after being put into a coma, he had a stroke, leading doctors to fear he was going to die. On 6 November 2013, his condition was described as critical but stable.

Abdusalamov's wife, Bakanay Abdusalamova, and their three daughters were with him in hospital.

Doctors briefly awakened Abdusalamov from his medically induced coma and removed his respirator on the morning of 22 November. He was brought back into medically induced coma later that day as a precautionary measure after his temperature rose to 103 degrees.

On Monday, 9 December, it was reported that the 32-year-old heavyweight was again out of coma, awake and aware of his surroundings, and that his condition had improved sufficiently to allow him to be moved to a regular room. "They said this is different than last time, because this time he's showing more improvement. He's awake. He's not able to speak, but he's awake and aware of his surroundings even if he can't speak. His eyes are open," said his promoter, Sampson Lewkowicz.

On 19 December 2013, the neurosurgeon attending to Abdusalamov said in his opinion, Abdusalamov's career was over, despite his condition improving. "He's going to get better, I'm confident", Dr. Rupendra Swarup said, "but he will not be the same. He's going to have neurological deficits."

In late May 2014, his wife Bakanay Abdusalamov told BoxingScene.com that Magomed was showing signs of improvement – he could recognize relatives, understand everything they were telling him, and was able to speak in short sentences with a low voice.

=== Medical bills ===
With Abdusalamov's family facing "staggering" medical bills from the very start, promoters Lewkowicz, Lou DiBella, Leon Margules, and others called for donations and set up a trust fund. The Abdusalamov family is also accepting donations directly and boxing charity Ring 10 has similarly called for donations.

== Lawsuit ==
In February 2014 it was reported that the family would sue the New York State Athletic Commission seeking $100 million in damages.

On 8 September 2017, New York State agreed to pay $22 million to Abdusalamov and his family following a lawsuit where the issue of assumed risk came to play. This was the largest personal injury award issued by New York State.

Speaking through his wife as his interpreter, Abdusalamov and his attorney, Paul Edelstein, are pushing for federal legislation to improve boxing safety. Currently, boxing regulations are mandated by the particular state in which a fight takes place. Edelstein has called for one set of rules to protect sport fighters across the United States.

== Professional boxing record ==
19 fights	18 wins	1 loss
By knockout	18	0
By decision	0	1

No.	Result	Record	Opponent	Type	Round, time	Date	Location	Notes
19	Loss	18–1	Mike Perez	UD	10	2 Nov 2013	The Theater at Madison Square Garden, New York City, New York, US	Lost WBC–USNBC heavyweight title
18	Win	18–0	Sebastian Ignacio Ceballos	TKO	1 (10), 1:01	27 Apr 2013	José Amalfitani Stadium, Buenos Aires, Argentina	Retained WBC–USNBC heavyweight title
17	Win	17–0	Victor Bisbal	TKO	5 (10), 1:12	8 Mar 2013	Resorts Casino Hotel, Atlantic City, New Jersey, US	Retained WBC–USNBC heavyweight title
16	Win	16–0	Jameel McCline	TKO	2 (10), 1:57	8 Sep 2012	Olympic Stadium, Moscow, Russia	Won vacant WBC–USNBC heavyweight title
15	Win	15–0	Maurice Byarm	TKO	2 (10), 0:36	7 Jun 2012	The Joint, Paradise, Nevada, US	Retained WBC–USNBC Silver heavyweight title
14	Win	14–0	Jason Pettaway	TKO	4 (10), 1:20	17 Mar 2012	The Theater at Madison Square Garden, New York City, New York, US	Won vacant WBC–USNBC Silver heavyweight title
13	Win	13–0	Pedro Rodriguez	TKO	2 (4), 1:04	3 Feb 2012	Texas Station, North Las Vegas, Nevada, US	
12	Win	12–0	Rich Power	TKO	3 (8), 2:21	20 Nov 2011	Texas Station, North Las Vegas, Nevada, US	
11	Win	11–0	Kotatsu Takehara	KO	1 (6), 2:38	28 Oct 2011	Sherwood Inn, Salinas, California, US	
10	Win	10–0	Kevin Burnett	TKO	1 (6), 1:18	1 Oct 2011	Boardwalk Hall, Atlantic City, New Jersey, US	
9	Win	9–0	Jerry Butler	TKO	2 (6), 2:39	7 Dec 2010	Hard Rock Live, Hollywood, Florida, US	
8	Win	8–0	Keon Graham	KO	1 (4), 1:30	22 Oct 2010	Miccosukee Resort & Gaming, Miami, Florida, US	
7	Win	7–0	Raymond Ochieng	TKO	1 (6), 1:35	6 Feb 2010	Hotel Aquarium, Moscow, Russia	
6	Win	6–0	Ryan Shay	TKO	1 (4), 2:06	31 Oct 2009	Cambria County War Memorial Arena, Johnstown, Pennsylvania, US	
5	Win	5–0	Sherzod Mamadjanov	KO	1 (6), 1:40	2 Jul 2009	Dynamo Sports Palace, Moscow, Russia	
4	Win	4–0	Larry White	TKO	1 (4), 1:56	27 Mar 2009	A La Carte Event Pavilion, Tampa, Florida, US	
3	Win	3–0	Maurice Winslow	TKO	1 (4), 1:13	27 Feb 2009	Hard Rock Live, Hollywood, Florida, US	
2	Win	2–0	Bernard Mwakasanga	TKO	1 (4), 1:25	21 Nov 2008	Ice Palace, Saint Petersburg, Russia	
1	Win	1–0	Epiphanie Pipi	KO	1 (4), 2:10	6 Sep 2008	Red Square, Moscow, Russia	

Sporting positions
Regional boxing titles
New title	WBC–USNBC Silver heavyweight champion 17 March 2012 – 8 September 2012; Won full title	Vacant Title next held by Billy Wright
Vacant Title last held by Chris Arreola	WBC–USNBC heavyweight champion 8 September 2012 – 2 November 2013	Succeeded by Mike Perez
