= Evans Ashira =

Danish-Kenyan boxer

Evans Ashira (born 28 December 1969) is a Kenyan former professional boxer, a multi-weight world title challenger, who is best known for his loss to Joe Calzaghe in 2005, but also unsuccessfully challenged Maselino Masoe for the WBA World Middleweight Title in 2004. He competed at the 1996 Summer Olympics in the Welterweight division, losing to Uzbekistans Nariman Ataev.

After retirement Ashira set up his own Boxing and fitness club in Hellerup, Denmark.

== Professional boxing record ==
32 fights	29 wins	3 losses
By knockout	15	1
By decision	13	2
By disqualification	1	0

No.	Result	Record	Opponent	Type	Round, time	Date	Location	Notes
32	Win	29–3	Mamadou Thiam	KO	6 (12), 2:05	19 Apr 2008	Frederikssund Hallen, Frederikssund, Denmark	Won inaugural UBO Inter-Continental super welterweight title
31	Win	28–3	Ian MacKillop	KO	2 (12), 2:28	14 Sep 2007	Forum, Horsens, Denmark	Won vacant IBA super welterweight title
30	Win	27–3	Florin Oanea	DQ	3 (6)	2 Aug 2007	Pag, Zadar County, Croatia	
29	Loss	26–3	Howard Eastman	UD	12	20 Apr 2007	Town Hall, Dudley, England	For vacant Commonwealth middleweight title
28	Win	26–2	Mike Algoet	UD	8	24 Nov 2006	Falconer Centeret, Frederiksberg, Denmark	
27	Win	25–2	Aliaksandr Shnip	UD	6	6 May 2006	Hala MOSiR, Łódź, Poland	
26	Loss	24–2	Joe Calzaghe	UD	12	10 Sep 2005	Cardiff International Arena, Cardiff, Wales	For WBO super middleweight title
25	Win	24–1	Quentin Smith	UD	10	30 Apr 2005	Madison Square Garden, Manhattan, New York, U.S.	
24	Loss	23–1	Maselino Masoe	TKO	2 (12), 0:44	1 May 2004	Jai Alai Fronton, Miami, Florida, U.S.	For vacant WBA (Regular) middleweight title
23	Win	23–0	Jerry Elliott	TKO	9 (12), 0:07	6 Sep 2003	Messehalle, Erfurt, Germany	Retained WBA Inter-Continental middleweight title
22	Win	22–0	Ruben Perez	TKO	6 (10), 0:25	15 Feb 2003	Caesars Palace, Paradise, Nevada, U.S.	
21	Win	21–0	Francisco Antonio Mora	UD	12	19 Apr 2002	Aarhus Stadionhal, Aarhus, Denmark	Retained WBA Inter-Continental middleweight title
20	Win	20–0	Fredrik Álvarez	KO	11 (12), 2:59	16 Jun 2001	Brøndbyhallen, Brøndby, Denmark	Won vacant WBA Inter-Continental and IBA middleweight titles
19	In	19–0	Olivier Meunier	UD	8	24 Nov 2000	Randers Hallen, Randers, Denmark	
18	Win	18–0	Mohamed Boualleg	UD	6	9 Sep 2000	Jetsmarkhallen, Pandrup, Denmark	
17	Win	17–0	Sidney Mxolisi Msutu	KO	8 (8), 1:10	19 Aug 2000	Silkeborg Hallerne, Silkeborg, Denmark	
16	Win	16–0	Octavian Stoica	UD	8	25 May 2000	Frederiksværk Hallen, Frederiksværk, Denmark	
15	Win	15–0	Darren Maciunski	TKO	7 (12), 0:06	28 Jan 2000	JK Pavilioner, Egtved, Denmark	Retained IBF Inter-Continental super welterweight title
14	Win	14–0	Jason Hart	RTD	3 (8), 3:00	5 Nov 1999	Aalborghallen, Aalborg, Denmark	
13	Win	13–0	Mack Razor	UD	8	10 Sep 1999	Struer Hallen, Struer, Denmark	
12	Win	12–0	Anthony Ivory	UD	8	13 Aug 1999	Skagen Hallen, Skagen, Denmark	
11	Win	11–0	Bahre Ahmeti	PTS	8	25 Jun 1999	Botanisk Have Aarhus, Denmark	
10	Win	10–0	Mario Lupp	UD	6	23 Apr 1999	Varde Hallen, Varde, Denmark	
9	Win	9–0	Silvio Luis Peppino	TKO	9 (12), 0:37	26 Mar 1999	Aarhus Stadionhal, Aarhus, Denmark	Won vacant IBF Inter-Continental super welterweight title
8	Win	8–0	Jorge Vaca	UD	10	5 Mar 1999	Sondermarkshallen, Give, Denmark	
7	Win	7–0	Vincent Mendy	PTS	8	21 Jan 1999	Jetsmarkhallen, Pandrup, Denmark	
6	Win	6–0	György Lakatos	TKO	2 (6)	17 Nov 1998	Aarhus Stadionhal, Aarhus, Denmark	
5	Win	5–0	Eduardo Carrion	TKO	2 (6)	30 Oct 1998	Odense Idrætshal, Odense, Denmark	
4	Win	4–0	Djaafar Filali	KO	4 (6), 2:30	28 Aug 1998	Aarhus Stadionhal, Aarhus, Denmark	
3	Win	3–0	Eric Daponte	TKO	3 (6), 2:03	22 Jul 1998	Outrup Speedwaybane, Outrup, Denmark	
2	Win	2–0	Nikolaj Bencsik	TKO	1 (4)	8 May 1998	Parkhallen, Horsens, Denmark	
1	Win	1–0	Konstantin Dima	TKO	2 (4)	27 Mar 1998	Aarhus Stadionhal, Aarhus, Denmark	
