= Sampson Lewkowicz =

American boxing promoter

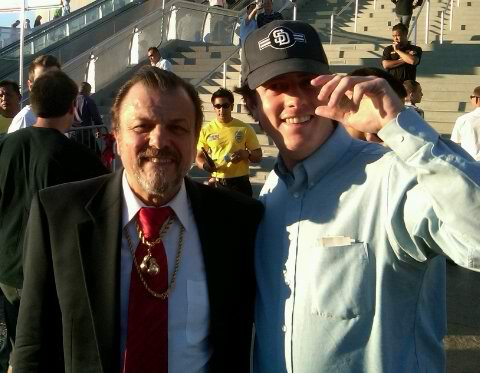
Lewkowicz (left) with a fan at the Thomas and Mack Center.

Sampson Lewkowicz (born January 10, 1951, in Montevideo) is an Uruguayan-American boxing promoter and manager, whose notable clients have included Sergio Martinez, Magomed Abdusalamov, Javier Fortuna, and Gabriel Campillo. Lewkowicz is also credited for having discovered Manny Pacquiao prior to the Filipino fighter's arrival in the United States, and served as matchmaker for Sultan Ibragimov.

Lewkowicz is the president of Sampson Boxing, a promotional and advising company for boxers. Lewkowicz has gained notable recognition for his role as chief adviser to multi-division world champion Sergio Martinez.

== Philanthropy ==
Lewkowicz was also involved in helping create a trust for boxer Magomed Abdusalamov after the boxer collapsed following his fight with Mike Perez.

== David Benavidez ==
Lewkowicz is also the manager of light heavyweight, unified cruiserweight and two-time super middleweight titlist David Benavidez. Lewkowicz also manages the unified Junior Middleweight world champion, Jeison Rosario. Rosario knocked out Julian Williams in 2019 to win the championship.
