= Jason McKay =

Irish boxer

Personal information
- Nickname: "Cool Hand"
- Born: Jason McKay; 11 October 1977 (age 48) Craigavon, Northern Ireland, United Kingdom
- Weight: super middleweight

Boxing career

Boxing record
- Total fights: 23
- Wins: 20
- Win by KO: 6
- Losses: 3
- Draws: 0
- No contests: 0

Jason McKay (born 11 October 1977 in Craigavon, Northern Ireland) is a professional boxer from Banbridge, County Down, fighting out of Belfast. McKay fights at super middleweight and is the former Irish light heavyweight champion.

== Amateur career ==
At an amateur level, McKay defeated John Duddy to become Ulster senior light middleweight champion.

== Professional career ==
McKay turned professional in February 2002 in Glasgow, Scotland. In his debut McKay defeated experienced English journeyman Jimmy Steel with a points victory over four rounds. McKay is a former holder of the Irish light heavyweight title which he won in November 2006 beating Michael Monaghan with a 10-round points win. In December 2007 he found Andy Lee for the Irish super middleweight title but lost in the 6th round. A year later McKay fought Darren Barker for the middleweight version of the Commonwealth title in Brentwood, Essex. He lost the fight after his corner pulled him out at the end of the 6th round.
