= Cornelius Carr =

English professional boxer (born 1969)

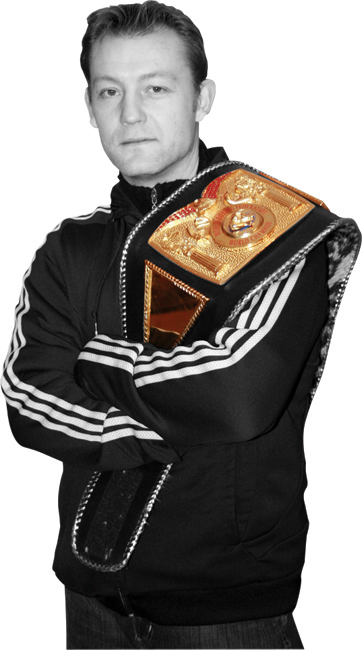
- Cornelius Carr, WBF Champion

Personal information
- Nationality: British
- Born: John Thomas Carr; 9 April 1969 (age 57) Middlesbrough, United Kingdom
- Height: 5 ft 9.5 in (1.77 m)

Boxing career
- Stance: Orthodox

Boxing record
- Total fights: 38
- Wins: 34
- Win by KO: 17
- Losses: 4
- Draws: 0
- No contests: 0

Cornelius Carr (born John Thomas Carr; 9 April 1969) is an English former professional boxer. He challenged once for the WBO world super middleweight title in 1995. His trainer was Martin (Marty) Turner

== Early life ==
At the age of nine he survived meningitis after 3 weeks of intensive care. He recovered to make first encounter with boxing aged 11 years at the Grangetown Amateur Boxing club in Middlesbrough, run by Martin Turner.

As a 17-year-old amateur he reached the 1987 Amateur Boxing Association of England National Championship final at Wembley Arena, London and fought Rod Douglas, an Olympic medalist and England squad member.

== Professional boxing career ==
=== British Super-Middleweight Champion ===
With only 1 defeat in 24 professional bouts, Carr won the BBBofC British Super-Middleweight in 1994 by beating James Cook on points at York Hall in London.

=== WBO Super Middleweight title fight ===
At short notice Carr was given the opportunity to challenge Steve Collins for the WBO Super Middleweight Title at The Point, Dublin, Ireland in November 1995. After 12 rounds he lost on points.

=== World Boxing Federation (WBF) World Middleweight Champion ===
In February 1999, Carr became the World Boxing Federation (WBF) World Middleweight Champion, defeating Steve Foster by a unanimous decision. He successfully defended this title in the following October beating Dingaan Thobela.

Cornelius Carr retired in 2001 with a record of: 34 Wins (17 KOs), 4 Losses.

== After professional career ==
Carr now resides in Bournemouth, England, working as a boxing coach and online mentor through the website Sneak Punch.

In June 2012, Chris Eubank hinted in the national press about a possible return to the ring. Carr issued a press release to the media attempting to drum up interest for a contest, although later admitted nothing had materialised.

Carr is featured in the video for the single "Boxers" by Morrissey, released in January 1995, and appears on the cover artwork for the 1995 Morrissey compilation album World of Morrissey as well as an earlier single by The Smiths, called "Sweet and Tender Hooligan".

== Professional boxing record ==
34 Wins (17 KOs), 4 Losses
Res.	Opponent	Type	Date	Location	Notes
Loss	(Australia) Sam Soliman	PTS	2001-02-28	(United Kingdom) Royal Garden Hotel, London	
Won	(United Kingdom) Gary Beardsley	PTS	2000-12-08	(United Kingdom) National Sports Centre, Crystal Palace, London	
Won	(South Africa) Dingaan Thobela	MD	1999-10-31	(United Kingdom) David Lloyd Tennis Centre, Raynes Park, London	Retained World Boxing Federation World middleweight title
Won	(United Kingdom) Jason Barker	TKO	1999-08-20	(United Kingdom) Royal National Hotel, Bloomsbury, London	
Won	(United Kingdom) Steve Foster	UD	1999-02-20	(United Kingdom) The Pavilion, Thornaby, Yorkshire	Won World Boxing Federation World middleweight title
Won	(United Kingdom) Jimmy Vincent	PTS	1998-11-25	(United Kingdom) Caesars Nightclub, Streatham, London	
Won	(United Kingdom) Danny Juma	PTS	1998-10-27	(United Kingdom) Fountain Leisure Centre, Brentford, London	
Won	(United Kingdom) Darren Covill	RTD	1998-09-10	(United Kingdom) Town Hall, Acton, London	
Loss	(United Kingdom) Dean Francis	TKO	1997-03-14	(United Kingdom) Rivermead Leisure Centre, Reading	
Won	(United Kingdom) Danny Juma	PTS	1996-03-02	(United Kingdom) Telewest Arena, Newcastle	
Loss	(Republic of Ireland) Steve Collins	UD	1995-11-25	(Republic of Ireland) Point Theatre, Dublin, Ireland	For WBO World super middleweight title
Won	(United Kingdom) Barry Thorogood	TKO	1995-07-07	Wales National Ice Rink, Cardiff, Wales	
Won	(United Kingdom) Chris Richards	RTD	1995-05-13	Kelvin Hall, Glasgow, Scotland	
Won	(United Kingdom) Colin Manners	PTS	1995-02-04	Wales National Ice Rink, Cardiff, Wales	
Won	(United Kingdom) James Cook	PTS	1994-03-11	(United Kingdom) York Hall, Bethnal Green, London	Won BBBofC British super middleweight title
Won	(United Kingdom) Horace Fleary	PTS	1993-09-22	(United Kingdom) Grand Hall, Wembley, London	
Won	(United Kingdom) Stan King	PTS	1993-05-19	(United Kingdom) Sunderland, Tyne and Wear	
Won	(United Kingdom) Graham Burton	PTS	1993-04-24	(United Kingdom) National Exhibition Centre, Birmingham	
Won	(United Kingdom) Alan Richards	PTS	1992-10-29	(United Kingdom) Bayswater, London	
Won	(United Kingdom) Marvin O'Brien	TKO	1991-09-07	Studio Comunate San Giacomo, Salemi, Sicilia, Italy	
Won	(United Kingdom) Paul Burton	TKO	1991-05-18	Palazzo Dello Sport, Verbania, Piemonte, Italy	
Won	(United Kingdom) Carlo Colarusso	PTS	1991-03-02	(United Kingdom) Dolphin Centre, Darlington	
Won	(United Kingdom) Frank Eubank	TKO	1991-02-16	(United Kingdom) The Pavilion, Thornaby, Yorkshire	
Won	(United States) Jerry Nestor	KO	1990-10-27	(United States) Greenville, Mississippi, US	
Won	(United States) John Maltreaux	KO	1990-09-26	(United States) New Orleans, Louisiana, US	
Won	(Ghana) Franky Moro	PTS	1990-04-21	(United Kingdom) Crowtree Leisure Centre, Sunderland	
Won	(United Kingdom) Peter Gorny	TKO	1990-02-20	(United Kingdom) New London Arena, Millwall, London	
Won	(United Kingdom) Carlo Colarusso	TKO	1989-10-24	(United Kingdom) Leisure Centre, Watford, Hertfordshire	
Loss	(Benin) Georges Bosco	TKO	1989-03-22	(United Kingdom) Rivermead Leisure Centre, Reading	
Won	(United Kingdom) Kevin Hayde	PTS	1988-12-20	Leisure Centre, Swansea, Wales	
Won	(United Kingdom) Skip Jackson	KO	1988-11-15	(United Kingdom) The Lads Club, Norwich, Norfolk	
Won	(United Kingdom) Andy Catesby	TKO	1988-05-10	(United Kingdom) Municipal Hall, Tottenham, London	
Won	(Ghana) Franky Moro	PTS	1988-04-12	National Sports Centre, Cardiff, Wales	
Won	(United Kingdom) Darren Parker	TKO	1988-03-24	(United Kingdom) York Hall, Bethnal Green, London	
Won	(United Kingdom) Kesem Clayton	PTS	1988-01-27	(United Kingdom) York Hall, Bethnal Green, London	
Won	(United Kingdom) Seamus Casey	TKO	1988-01-12	National Sports Centre, Cardiff, Wales	Casey was badly cut over left eye
Won	(United Kingdom) Dave Heaver	TKO	1987-11-28	(United Kingdom) Blazers Night Club, Windsor, Berkshire	
Won	(United Kingdom) Paul Burton	TKO	1987-09-22	(United Kingdom) York Hall, Bethnal Green, London	Professional debut

Achievements
Preceded by James Cook	BBBofC Super-Middleweight Champion; 11 March 1994 – 23 January 1995	Succeeded by Ali Forbes
Preceded by Joaquin Velasquez	World Boxing Federation (WBF) World Middleweight Champion; 20 February 1999 – 10 March 2000	Succeeded by Delroy Leslie
