= Howard Eastman =

Guyanese-British boxer

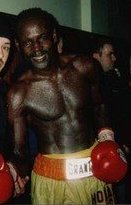

Personal information
- Nickname: The Battersea Bomber
- Nationality: British; Guyanese
- Born: Howard Anthony Eastman; 8 December 1970 (age 55) New Amsterdam, Guyana
- Height: 5 ft 11 in (180 cm)
- Weight: Middleweight

Boxing career
- Reach: 74 in (188 cm)
- Stance: Orthodox

Boxing record
- Total fights: 62
- Wins: 49
- Win by KO: 38
- Losses: 13

Howard Anthony Eastman (born 8 December 1970) is a Guyanese-British former professional boxer who competed from 1994 to 2014. He challenged twice for middleweight world championships; the vacant WBA title in 2001; and the undisputed title against Bernard Hopkins in 2005. At regional level, he held the British, Commonwealth and EBU European middleweight titles twice each between 1998 and 2007.

== Early years ==
Having spent some time homeless, Eastman later served in the Gulf War in the Royal Fusiliers. He turned professional in March 1994 with a first-round knockout of John Rice. He garnered a reputation as a heavy puncher in the gyms of the UK, where he regularly sparred with Super Middleweights, such as Chris Eubank. His career progressed slowly and at a low profile for many years as fellow British boxers were reluctant to face him. He accumulated an 18-0 (16 knockouts) record before challenging Steve "The Viking" Foster in November 1998 for the British Middleweight title, which he won via 7th-round knockout. In September 2000 he won the Commonwealth Middleweight title by outpointing Australian-based Egyptian (and future #1 contender) Sam Soliman, and finally began receiving wider coverage.

== World title challenger ==
In April 2001, having put together a 31-0 (28 knockouts) record, he got a high-profile fight defending his British and Commonwealth titles and challenging for the vacant European title against Robert McCracken, who had unsuccessfully challenged Keith Holmes for the WBC world title the previous year.

Eastman dominated the fight and dropped McCracken, stopping him in the 10th round.

Following this match, U.S. promoter Don King signed him up and in November 2001 he fought two-time champ William Joppy for the vacant WBA world title on a Lennox Lewis undercard in Las Vegas. Eastman narrowly lost a controversial majority decision despite knocking Joppy down in the final seconds of the twelfth round. After this fight Eastman sat out a year in Guyana and let his contract with King expire.

Eastman resurfaced in late 2002, under the Hennessy Sports promotional outfit, and trained by former opponent McCracken. Eastman scored two knockouts, over Chardan Ansoula and Hussain Osman, respectively. He regained his European title in January 2003 against the French man Christophe Tendil, whom he stopped in five rounds with a broken jaw, and regained his British and Commonwealth titles by knocking out Scott Dann in three rounds. He defended the European title twice more, stopping ex-world champion Hacine Cherifi in eight rounds in July 2003 and outpointing Sergey Tatevoysan in January 2004.

Now with a 40-1 record and highly ranked by all sanctioning bodies, Eastman finally got the forty-year-old undisputed Middleweight king Bernard Hopkins into the ring to defend his titles, in February 2005 in Los Angeles. Eastman was outsmarted and widely outpointed by Hopkins (110-119, 111-117, 112-116) who was making his historic 20th defence. Post-fight there was initial talk of a rematch, however as the scores suggest the contest for not close enough for this to materialize.

== After the world title fights ==
Eastman travelled to Germany in July 2005 to fight a WBA eliminator against hard hitting Armenian Arthur Abraham, Eastman lost the fight on points however claimed he had been robbed of the decision. Abraham went on to win the vacant IBF world title after the unified middleweight title was fractured after Hopkins lost to Jermain Taylor.

In March 2006, Eastman traveled to the U.S. and took on another risky eliminator, this time for the IBF title. He was stopped on his feet by the undefeated Colombian-Puerto Rican Edison Miranda. Eastman protested that he should have been allowed to continue since he had not been down in the fight.

== Reclaiming his belts ==
On 15 December 2006, he regained his British Middleweight title by knocking out Richard Williams in the 12th and final round in London, England. Eastman was well ahead on all scorecards by the time the match ended.

In April 2007, Eastman added the Commonwealth belt to the British title with a 12-round points decision over the Kenyan Evans Ashira in Dudley. Eastman prevailed 116-113, 116-112, 116-113.

In September 2007, Eastmans revival was ended. When defending his British title against domestic fighter Wayne Elcock Eastman was surprisingly outworked and outpunched, dropping a shock points defeat by margins of 113-116, 113-115, 114-115. Elcock had previously been knocked out by Eastman-victim Scott Dann. Eastman was offered a final shot at contention, matched with John Duddy in Belfast. After a competitive 10 rounds, Eastman lost a unanimous decision.

== Guyana ==
Eastman has continued his career in his country of birth, Guyana. He beat Denny Dalton to claim the Guyanese middleweight title, before securing victories over former WBA world welterweight champion Andrew Lewis, Leon Gilkes and Kevin Placide. In 2010 he served time in prison for possession of cannabis.

However, following the Placide fight, he went on a six-fight losing streak, losing to Kwesi Jones (September 2010, UD4), Kirt Sinnette (July 2011, TKO8, for the vacant WBC CABOFE light-heavyweight title), Edmund DeClou (October 2011, MD12, for the vacant Guyanese middleweight title), two defeats to Simeon Hardy in 2012 (UD10 and MD8) and Sakima Mullings (April 2013, UD12, for the vacant WBC CABOFE welterweight title).

Eastman ended this streak in August 2013, when he took a unanimous decision over Mark Austin over 8 rounds. In 2014, he entered the Jamaican version of the Contender series, where he was the second seed behind the aforementioned Mullings, and part of the Caribbean team. In his first fight against the Jamaican team, Eastman stopped Derrick Spencer in two rounds, his quickest win since 2003.

== Professional boxing record ==
62 fights	49 wins	13 losses
By knockout	38	2
By decision	11	11

No.	Result	Record	Opponent	Type	Round, time	Date	Location	More
62	Loss	49–13	(Jamaica) Tsetsi Davis	UD	8	18 Jun 2014	Wray & Nephew Contender Coliseum, Kingston, Jamaica	
61	Win	49–12	(Jamaica) Kevin Hylton	UD	6	21 May 2014	Chinese Benevolent Association Auditorium, Kingston, Jamaica	
60	Win	48–12	(Jamaica) Derrick Spencer	KO	2 (6), 1:50	30 Apr 2014	Chinese Benevolent Association Auditorium, Kingston, Jamaica	
59	Win	47–12	(Guyana) Mark Austin	UD	8	3 Aug 2013	Cliff Anderson Sports Hall, Georgetown, Guyana	
58	Loss	46–12	(Jamaica) Sakima Mullings	UD	12	20 Apr 2013	Princess Hotel, Georgetown, Guyana	
57	Loss	46–11	(Guyana) Simeon Hardy	MD	8	13 Oct 2012	Thirst Park, Georgetown, Guyana	
56	Loss	46–10	(Guyana) Simeon Hardy	UD	10	1 Jun 2012	Cliff Anderson Sports Hall, Georgetown, Guyana	
55	Loss	46–9	(Guyana) Edmund DeClou	MD	12	29 Oct 2011	Thirst Park, Georgetown, Guyana	For vacant Guyanese middleweight title
54	Loss	46–8	(Trinidad and Tobago) Kirt Sinnette	TKO	8 (10)	29 Jul 2011	Jean Pierre Sports Complex, Port of Spain, Trinidad and Tobago	
53	Loss	46–7	(Guyana) Kwesi Jones	UD	4	24 Sep 2010	Cliff Anderson Sports Hall, Georgetown, Guyana	
52	Win	46–6	(Trinidad and Tobago) Kevin Placide	KO	10 (10), 2:19	26 Sep 2009	Cliff Anderson Sports Hall, Georgetown, Guyana	
51	Win	45–6	(Guyana) Leon Gilkes	UD	10	28 Feb 2009	Cliff Anderson Sports Hall, Georgetown, Guyana	
50	Win	44–6	(Guyana) Andrew Lewis	SD	12	25 Oct 2008	Guyana National Stadium, Georgetown, Guyana	Retained Guyanese middleweight title
49	Win	43–6	(Guyana) Denny Dalton	MD	12	5 Jul 2008	Cliff Anderson Sports Hall, Georgetown, Guyana	Won Guyanese middleweight title
48	Loss	42–6	(Republic of Ireland) John Duddy	PTS	10	8 Dec 2007	(United Kingdom) King's Hall, Belfast, Northern Ireland	
47	Loss	42–5	(United Kingdom) Wayne Elcock	UD	12	28 Sep 2007	(United Kingdom) Coventry Skydome, Coventry, England	Lost BBBofC British middleweight title
46	Win	42–4	(Kenya) Evans Ashira	UD	12	20 Apr 2007	(United Kingdom) Dudley Town Hall, Dudley, England	Won vacant Commonwealth middleweight title
45	Win	41–4	(United Kingdom) Richard Williams	KO	12 (12), 2:06	15 Dec 2006	(United Kingdom) York Hall, London, England	Won vacant BBBofC British middleweight title
44	Loss	40–4	(Colombia) Edison Miranda	TKO	7 (12), 2:33	24 Mar 2006	(United States) Hard Rock Live, Hollywood, Florida, U.S.	
43	Loss	40–3	(Germany) Arthur Abraham	UD	12	16 Jul 2005	Nuremberg Arena, Nuremberg, Germany	For WBA Inter-Continental middleweight title
42	Loss	40–2	(United States) Bernard Hopkins	UD	12	19 Feb 2005	(United States) Staples Center, Los Angeles, California, U.S.	For WBA (Undisputed), WBC, IBF, WBO, and The Ring middleweight titles
41	Win	40–1	(Nigeria) Jerry Elliott	PTS	10	24 Sep 2004	(United Kingdom) Nottingham Arena, Nottingham, England	
40	Win	39–1	(Russia) Sergey Tatevosyan	UD	12	30 Jan 2004	(United Kingdom) Goresbrook Leisure Centre, Dagenham, England	Retained EBU European middleweight title
39	Win	38–1	(France) Hacine Cherifi	RTD	8 (12), 3:00	25 Jul 2003	(United Kingdom) Sports Village, Norwich, England	Retained EBU European middleweight title
38	Win	37–1	(United Kingdom) Scott Dann	TKO	3 (12), 2:52	16 Apr 2003	(United Kingdom) Nottingham Arena, Nottingham, England	Retained EBU European, Commonwealth, and BBBofC British middleweight titles
37	Win	36–1	(United Kingdom) Gary Beardsley	TKO	2 (8), 2:27	5 Mar 2003	(United Kingdom) York Hall, London, England	
36	Win	35–1	(France) Christophe Tendil	RTD	3 (12), 3:00	21 Jan 2003	(United Kingdom) Nottingham Arena, Nottingham, England	Won vacant EBU European middleweight title
35	Win	34–1	(Syria) Hussain Osman	RTD	4 (8), 3:00	21 Dec 2002	(United Kingdom) Goresbrook Leisure Centre, Dagenham, England	
34	Win	33–1	(France) Charden Ansoula	TKO	1 (8), 1:03	25 Oct 2002	(United Kingdom) York Hall, London, England	
33	Loss	32–1	(United States) William Joppy	MD	12	17 Nov 2001	(United States) Mandalay Bay Events Arena, Las Vegas, Nevada, U.S.	For vacant WBA (Regular) middleweight title
32	Win	32–0	(United Kingdom) Robert McCracken	TKO	10 (12), 1:54	10 Apr 2001	(United Kingdom) Wembley Conference Centre, London, England	Retained Commonwealth and BBBofC British middleweight titles; Won vacant EBU European middleweight title
31	Win	31–0	(United Kingdom) Mark Baker	RTD	5 (10), 3:00	5 Feb 2001	(United Kingdom) Hull City Hall, Kingston upon Hull, England	
30	Win	30–0	(Australia) Sam Soliman	PTS	12	16 Sep 2000	(United Kingdom) York Hall, London, England	Won Commonwealth middleweight title
29	Win	29–0	(Russia) Akhmet Dottuev	RTD	4 (10), 3:00	25 Jul 2000	(United Kingdom) Elephant & Castle Centre, London, England	Won WBA International middleweight title
28	Win	28–0	(United States) Anthony Ivory	RTD	6 (8), 3:00	29 Apr 2000	(United Kingdom) Wembley Arena, London, England	
27	Win	27–0	(Ukraine) Viktor Fesechko	RTD	4 (10), 3:00	4 Mar 2000	(United Kingdom) Werrington Sports Centre, Peterborough, England	
26	Win	26–0	(United Kingdom) Ojay Abrahams	TKO	2 (10)	18 Jan 2000	(United Kingdom) Mansfield Leisure Centre, Mansfield, England	
25	Win	25–0	(Belgium) Mike Algoet	TKO	8 (12), 1:45	13 Nov 1999	(United Kingdom) K.C. Sports Arena, Kingston upon Hull, England	Won CBA middleweight title
24	Win	24–0	(United Kingdom) Derek Wormald	TKO	3 (12), 2:56	13 Sep 1999	(United Kingdom) York Hall, London, England	Won BBBofC British middleweight title
23	Win	23–0	(Georgia (country)) Teimuraz Kekelidze	RTD	6 (12), 3:00	10 Jul 1999	(United Kingdom) Elephant & Castle Centre, London, England	Won WBA Continental middleweight title
22	Win	22–0	(Russia) Roman Babaev	TKO	7 (12), 1:44	22 May 1999	(United Kingdom) Maysfield Leisure Centre, Belfast, Northern Ireland	Won WBA Inter-Continental middleweight title
21	Win	21–0	(United Kingdom) Jon Penn	TKO	3 (12), 1:36	6 Mar 1999	(United Kingdom) Elephant & Castle Centre, London, England	Won vacant IBO Inter-Continental super middleweight title
20	Win	20–0	(United Kingdom) Jason Barker	TKO	6 (8), 2:25	4 Feb 1999	(United Kingdom) Concert Theatre, London, England	
19	Win	19–0	(United Kingdom) Steve Foster	TKO	7 (12), 1:45	30 Nov 1998	(United Kingdom) Bowlers Exhibition Centre, Manchester, England	Won vacant BBBofC British middleweight title
18	Win	18–0	(United Kingdom) Darren Ashton	TKO	4 (8), 0:54	23 May 1998	(United Kingdom) York Hall, London, England	
17	Win	17–0	(United Kingdom) Terry Morrill	RTD	4 (8), 3:00	28 Mar 1998	(United Kingdom) Hull Arena, Kingston upon Hull, England	
16	Win	16–0	(Ukraine) Vitaly Kopytko	PTS	8	14 Feb 1998	(United Kingdom) Elephant & Castle Centre, London, England	
15	Win	15–0	(France) Rachid Serdjane	TKO	7 (8), 3:00	25 Mar 1997	(United Kingdom) Lewisham Theatre, London, England	
14	Win	14–0	(United Kingdom) John Duckworth	KO	7 (8), 0:30	18 Feb 1997	(United Kingdom) Grundy Park Leisure Centre, Cheshunt, England	
13	Win	13–0	(United Kingdom) Sven Hamer	TKO	10 (10)	11 Dec 1996	(United Kingdom) Elephant & Castle Centre, London, England	Won vacant BBBofC Southern Area middleweight title
12	Win	12–0	(United Kingdom) John Duckworth	TKO	5 (8)	29 Apr 1996	(United Kingdom) Marriott Hotel, London, England	
11	Win	11–0	(United Kingdom) Steve Goodwin	TKO	5 (8)	13 Mar 1996	(United Kingdom) Brent Town Hall, London, England	
10	Win	10–0	(United Kingdom) Paul Wesley	TKO	1 (6), 2:32	31 Jan 1996	(United Kingdom) Aston Villa Leisure Centre, Birmingham, England	
9	Win	9–0	(United Kingdom) Brendan Ryan	TKO	2 (6)	29 Nov 1995	(United Kingdom) York Hall, London, England	
8	Win	8–0	(United Kingdom) Carlo Colarusso	TKO	1 (6)	16 Oct 1995	(United Kingdom) Marriott Hotel, London, England	
7	Win	7–0	(United Kingdom) Peter Vosper	TKO	1 (6)	23 Jun 1995	(United Kingdom) York Hall, London, England	
6	Win	6–0	(United Kingdom) Stuart Dunn	TKO	2 (6)	20 Apr 1995	(United Kingdom) London Hilton on Park Lane, London, England	
5	Win	5–0	(United Kingdom) Marty Duke	TKO	1 (6)	6 Mar 1995	(United Kingdom) Marriott Hotel, London, England	
4	Win	4–0	(United Kingdom) Barry Thorogood	TKO	6 (6)	17 Oct 1994	(United Kingdom) Marriott Hotel, London, England	
3	Win	3–0	(United Kingdom) Steve Phillips	TKO	5 (6), 1:18	22 Mar 1994	(United Kingdom) York Hall, London, England	
2	Win	2–0	(United Kingdom) Andy Peach	PTS	6	14 Mar 1994	(United Kingdom) Marriott Hotel, London, England	
1	Win	1–0	(United Kingdom) John Rice	TKO	1 (6)	6 Mar 1994	(United Kingdom) Elephant & Castle Centre, London, England	

== See also ==
- List of British middleweight boxing champions

Regional titles
Preceded by Glenn Catley; Vacated	British Middleweight Champion; 30 November 1998 – 16 April 2003; Vacated	Succeeded by Scott Dann
Preceded by Scott Dann; Vacated	British Middleweight Champion; 15 December 2006 – 28 September 2007	Succeeded by Wayne Elcock
