= Paul Smith (boxer) =

English boxer

Paul James Smith Jr.
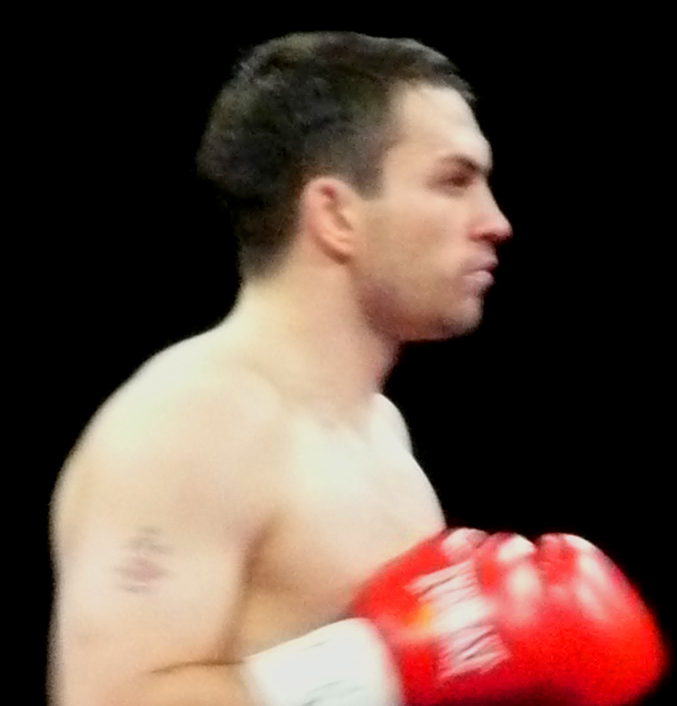
- Smith in 2011

Personal information
- Nickname: Real Gone Kid
- Nationality: British
- Born: Paul James Smith Jr. 6 October 1982 (age 44) Liverpool, Merseyside, England
- Height: 5 ft 11 in (180 cm)
- Weight: Middleweight; Super-middleweight; Light-heavyweight

Boxing career
- Reach: 72 in (183 cm)
- Stance: Orthodox

Boxing record
- Total fights: 45
- Wins: 38
- Win by KO: 22
- Losses: 7
Medal record
Representing England
Men's amateur boxing
Commonwealth Games
Silver medal – second place	2002 Manchester	Light-middleweight

Paul Smith
- Genre: Grime
- Occupations: MC, songwriter
- Years active: 2004–present

Paul James Smith Jr. (born 6 October 1982) is a British former professional boxer who competed from 2003 to 2017, and has since worked as a commentator. He held the English middleweight title in 2008, the British super-middleweight title twice between 2009 and 2014, and challenged three times for a super-middleweight world title. As an amateur, he won a silver medal in the light middleweight division at the 2002 Commonwealth Games.

== Amateur career ==
Smith started boxing at age nine with the Rotunda amateur boxing club and fought in South Africa, Uzbekistan, and Denmark representing England. He comes from a family of boxers and he and his brothers (Stephen, Liam, and Callum) became the first group of siblings to all win ABA titles. Paul won silver medals for his country in the 2001 Copenhagen Cup and 2002 Commonwealth Games, losing to Jean Pascal by two points; Smith was then picked up by Frank Warren and turned professional.

== Professional career ==
=== Early career ===
Smith's career has featured many bouts held mainly in the UK, Germany and the USA. He has faced Andre Ward and Arthur Abraham for the WBO Super-Middleweight title twice. The first was a controversial decision.

On 10 March 2007, he KO'd the Belgian, Alexander Polizzi in Liverpool, winning the WBU international middleweight title in the eighth round.

On 20 March 2007, Smith took part in boxing's answer to Golf's Ryder Cup fighting American Jonathan Reid; the Nashville, Tennessee resident lost to Smith on a technical knockout.

==== The Contender ====
On 4 September 2007, Smith joined nine other boxing hopefuls as members of season three of The Contender. Smith fought rival David Banks from Portland, Oregon, and ended with a win for Smith by split-decision. However, since Smith had the lowest point total out of the remaining boxers, he was disqualified. The victory over David Banks was fought in Pasadena, California and was broadcast on ESPN and ITV; Ray Leonard said Smith let his anger take away from his ability. Smith was left with two cuts, one on his nose and another around his eye; this meant he was medically unfit to continue the contest regardless of performance.

Smith returned to England and defeated Cello Renda to win the vacant English middleweight title. He lost the title in his very next fight against Steven Bendall on 21 June 2008 in Birmingham, England, on a much contested points decision.

=== British super-middleweight champion ===
On 30 October 2009, Smith challenged Tony Quigley for the British super-middleweight title in Liverpool's Echo Arena. Quigley was the holder of the British title after defeating Tony Dodson only months earlier at the same venue. The fight was a tight affair with Smith eventually winning via split decision over 12 rounds thus crowning him the new British super-middleweight title holder.

Smith's first defense of his title came in his thirtieth professional contest at the Echo Arena, Liverpool on 12 March 2010, against Tony Dodson. Smith won again, this time via a unanimous 12-round decision.

Smith boxed Beijing 2008 gold medalist, James DeGale at the Echo Arena, Liverpool on 11 December 2012. The fight was stopped in the ninth round as DeGale landed back-to-back left hooks on Smith, causing the latter to lose his British super-middleweight title.

=== Smith vs. Groves ===
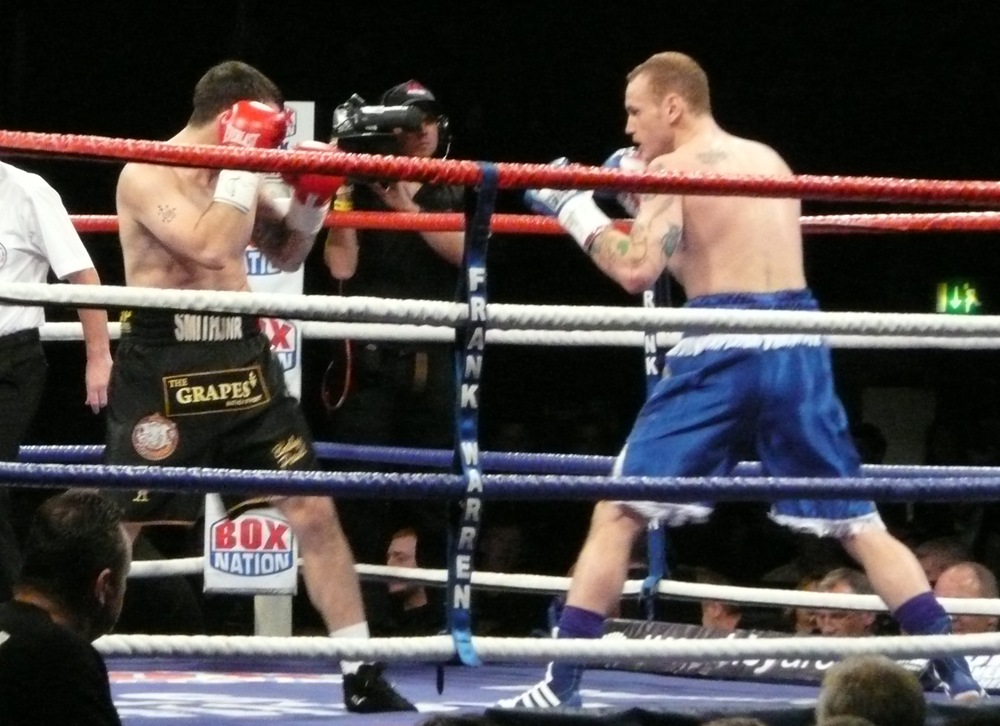
Smith (left) vs. Groves, 2011

After winning his next two fights, Smith once again challenged for the British title and the Commonwealth title against George Groves. The bout took place in Groves' native London at the Wembley Arena on 5 November 2011. Smith won the opening round on all three judges cards and landed a hard shot on Groves towards the end of the round. One minute into the second round, however, a lead overhand right from Groves to Smith's jaw floored him. Smith was able to beat the count only to be dropped again, forcing the referee to halt the contest.

=== Smith vs. Abraham ===
On 27 September 2014, Smith fought WBO Super-Middleweight title holder Arthur Abraham in Kiel, Germany. Despite arguably outworking Abraham for the full 12 rounds, the judges ruled in the Armenian's favour by scores of 119–109, 117–111 and 117–110. Many ringside observers saw the fight as being far closer than the judges ruled it and Smith's promoter Eddie Hearn labelled the judges scores a "disgrace."

The two met in a rematch on 21 February 2015, at the O2 World Arena in Berlin. This also went the full 12 rounds as Abraham won via points on all three scorecards (116–112, 117–111 twice).

=== Smith vs. Ward ===
After his loss to Abraham, Smith faced top pound for pound boxer, Andre Ward. This was Ward's first fight in 19 months, following a promotional dispute which sidelined him and caused him to lose his titles. The fight was scheduled for 20 June 2015 at the Oracle Arena in California at a 172 lbs catchweight fight. The fight was to take place on BET. Ward won via TKO in the 9th round. Ward was winning every round at the time of stoppage, with all three judges scoring it 80–72. Smith missed weight, coming in at 176.4 lbs and was fined 20% ($45,000) of his $225,000 purse by the California State Athletic Commission, half of which went to Ward and half to the commission. Despite being available in over 90 million homes, the fight averaged 323,000 viewers on BET.

==== Smith vs. Kubin ====
In his comeback fight, Smith faced Bronislav Kubin. Smith dropped Kubin twice in the second round, and managed to finish his opponent in the third round, to get his comeback win.

==== Smith vs. Grafka ====
Smith won the second fight of his comeback, this time a 59 to 55 points victory over six rounds, against Bartlomiej Grafka.

==== Smith vs. Regi ====
On 10 September 2016 Smith fought Daniel Regi on the Golovkin vs. Brook undercard. Smith dropped his opponent several times, en route to a fifth-round TKO win.

=== Smith vs. Zeuge ===
Smith's third and final world title challenge came against WBA (Regular) super middleweight champion Tyron Zeuge in June 2017 at Rittal Arena Wetzlar. The younger Zeuge proved to be too much for Smith, as he won a wide unanimous decision (119–108, 119–108, 119–108). Zeuge outworked Smith with his jab and was able to score a knockdown in round 12.

== Music career ==
As well as being a boxer, Smith is a resident DJ at the 'Society' nightclub in Liverpool. He co-wrote the Ultrabeat song "Better Than Life", with Mike Di Scala and has remixed the song "Falling Stars (Waiting for a Star To Fall)" by Sunset Strippers, also with Di Scala.

== Personal life ==
Paul Smith comes from a family of professional boxers, which includes Stephen Smith, Liam Smith, and Callum Smith.

== Professional boxing record ==
45 fights	38 wins	7 losses
By knockout	22	3
By decision	16	4

No.	Result	Record	Opponent	Type	Round, time	Date	Location	Notes
45	Loss	38–7	Tyron Zeuge	UD	12	17 Jun 2017	Rittal Arena, Wetzlar, Germany	For WBA (Regular) and GBU super-middleweight titles
44	Win	38–6	Daniel Regi	TKO	5 (6), 2:16	10 Sep 2016	The O2 Arena, London, England	
43	Win	37–6	Bartlomiej Grafka	PTS	6	29 May 2016	Goodison Park, Liverpool, England	
42	Win	36–6	Bronislav Kubin	TKO	3 (6), 0:25	7 May 2016	Manchester Arena, Manchester, England	
41	Loss	35–6	Andre Ward	TKO	9 (12), 1:46	20 Jun 2015	Oracle Arena, Oakland, California, US	
40	Loss	35–5	Arthur Abraham	UD	12	21 Feb 2015	O2 World Arena, Berlin, Germany	For WBO super-middleweight title
39	Loss	35–4	Arthur Abraham	UD	12	27 Sep 2014	Sparkassen-Arena, Kiel, Germany	For WBO super-middleweight title
38	Win	35–3	David Sarabia	TKO	2 (8), 1:17	17 May 2014	Motorpoint Arena, Cardiff, Wales	
37	Win	34–3	Jamie Ambler	PTS	6	14 Dec 2013	ExCeL, London, England	
36	Win	33–3	Tony Dodson	TKO	6 (12), 2:31	29 Jun 2013	Bolton Arena, Bolton, England	Won vacant British super-middleweight title
35	Win	32–3	Tommy Tolan	RTD	4 (6), 3:00	9 Nov 2012	Liverpool Olympia, Liverpool, England	
34	Loss	31–3	George Groves	TKO	2 (12), 1:18	5 Nov 2011	Wembley Arena, London, England	For British and Commonwealth super-middleweight titles
33	Win	31–2	Paul Samuels	TKO	1 (8), 2:22	17 Sep 2011	Liverpool Olympia, Liverpool, England	
32	Win	30–2	Jozsef Matolcsi	KO	1 (8), 0:58	21 May 2011	The O2 Arena, London, England	
31	Loss	29–2	James DeGale	TKO	9 (12), 2:08	11 Dec 2010	Echo Arena, Liverpool, England	Lost British super-middleweight title
30	Win	29–1	Tony Dodson	UD	12	12 Mar 2010	Echo Arena, Liverpool, England	Retained British super-middleweight title
29	Win	28–1	Tony Quigley	SD	12	30 Oct 2009	Echo Arena, Liverpool, England	Won British super-middleweight title
28	Win	27–1	Michal Bilak	PTS	8	18 Jul 2009	MEN Arena, Manchester, England	
27	Win	26–1	Rashid Matumla	TKO	2 (12), 2:35	14 Mar 2009	MEN Arena, Manchester, England	Won vacant WBA International super-middleweight title
26	Win	25–1	Ciaran Healy	PTS	6	12 Dec 2008	Kingsway Leisure Centre, Widnes, England	
25	Win	24–1	Danny Thornton	KO	6 (8), 2:50	6 Sep 2008	MEN Arena, Manchester, England	
24	Loss	23–1	Steven Bendall	PTS	10	21 Jun 2008	National Indoor Arena, Birmingham, England	Lost English middleweight title
23	Win	23–0	Cello Renda	TKO	6 (10), 1:55	8 Mar 2008	The O2 Arena, London, England	Won vacant English middleweight title
22	Win	22–0	Francis Cheka	PTS	8	8 Dec 2007	Bolton Arena, Bolton, England	
21	Win	21–0	David Banks	SD	5	9 Oct 2007	The Contender Arena, Los Angeles, California, US	Part of The Contender series 3
20	Win	20–0	Jonathan Reid	TKO	7 (8), 1:21	30 Mar 2007	Metro Radio Arena, Newcastle, England	Part of The Contender Challenge: UK vs. USA
19	Win	19–0	Alexander Polizzi	TKO	8 (12)	10 Mar 2007	Liverpool Olympia, Liverpool, England	
18	Win	18–0	Ryan Walls	TKO	4 (8), 2:48	18 Nov 2006	Newport Centre, Newport, Wales	
17	Win	17–0	Dean Walker	TKO	3 (10), 2:49	14 Oct 2006	MEN Arena, Manchester, England	Won vacant British Central Area middleweight title
16	Win	16–0	Conroy McIntosh	PTS	8	1 Jun 2006	Metrodome, Barnsley, England	
15	Win	15–0	Hussain Osman	TKO	4 (6), 2:00	11 Mar 2006	Newport Centre, Newport, Wales	
14	Win	14–0	Simeon Cover	PTS	6	3 Jun 2005	MEN Arena, Manchester, England	
13	Win	13–0	Rob Burton	KO	1 (6), 1:54	11 Feb 2005	MEN Arena, Manchester, England	
12	Win	12–0	Howard Clarke	KO	1 (6), 2:11	17 Dec 2004	Everton Park Sports Centre, Liverpool, England	
11	Win	11–0	Jason Collins	TKO	1 (6), 1:42	1 Oct 2004	MEN Arena, Manchester, England	
10	Win	10–0	Ojay Abrahams	PTS	4	10 Sep 2004	Everton Park Sports Centre, Liverpool, England	
9	Win	9–0	Steve Timms	TKO	1 (6), 2:57	12 Jun 2004	MEN Arena, Manchester, England	
8	Win	8–0	Howard Clarke	PTS	4	3 Apr 2004	MEN Arena, Manchester, England	
7	Win	7–0	Davy Jones	PTS	4	26 Feb 2004	Kingsway Leisure Centre, Widnes, England	
6	Win	6–0	Joel Ani	PTS	4	13 Dec 2003	MEN Arena, Manchester, England	
5	Win	5–0	Mike Duffield	TKO	1 (4), 2:41	10 Feb 2003	Everton Park Sports Centre, Liverpool, England	
4	Win	4–0	Patrick Cito	PTS	4	29 Aug 2003	Everton Park Sports Centre, Liverpool, England	
3	Win	3–0	Silver Fox	TKO	2 (4), 2:40	20 Jun 2003	Everton Park Sports Centre, Liverpool, England	
2	Win	2–0	Andrey Ivanov	TKO	2 (4), 1:00	8 May 2003	Kingsway Leisure Centre, Widnes, England	
1	Win	1–0	Howard Clarke	PTS	4	5 Apr 2003	MEN Arena, Manchester, England	

Sporting positions
Amateur boxing titles
Previous: Matthew Thirwall	ABA light-middleweight champion 2002	Next: Antony Fowler
Regional boxing titles
Vacant Title last held by Dean Walker	British Central Area middleweight champion 14 October 2006 – 8 March 2008; Won English title	Vacant Title next held by Jez Wilson
Vacant Title last held by Wayne Elcock	English middleweight champion 8 March 2008 – 21 June 2008	Succeeded by Steven Bendall
Vacant Title last held by Paul Muyodi	WBA International super-middleweight champion 14 March 2009 – May 2010; Vacated	Vacant Title next held by James DeGale
Preceded by Tony Quigley	British super-middleweight champion 30 October 2009 – 11 December 2010	Succeeded by James DeGale
Vacant Title last held by Kenny Anderson	British super-middleweight champion 29 June 2013 – September 2014; Vacated	Vacant Title next held by Callum Smith
