= Wayne Elcock =

British boxer

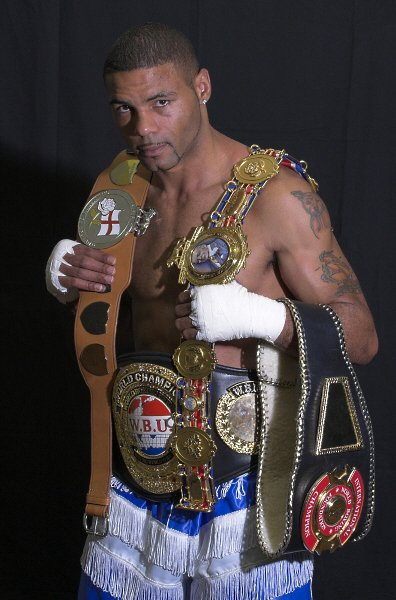

Personal information
- Nickname: Mad Dog
- Nationality: British
- Born: 12 February 1974 (age 52) Birmingham, England
- Height: 5 ft 9 1/2 in (177 cm)
- Weight: Middleweight

Boxing career
- Stance: Orthodox

Boxing record
- Total fights: 23
- Wins: 17
- Win by KO: 9
- Losses: 4

Wayne Elcock (born 12 February 1974) is a British former professional boxer who competed from 1999 to 2009. He challenged once for the IBF middleweight title in 2007. At the regional level, he held the British middleweight title from 2007 to 2009.

== Career ==
Elcock was managed by Frank Maloney at the start of his career and promoted by Panix promotions before moving after two winning fights to Frank Warren, then later to Mick Hennessy. Elcock was trained in Leicester to begin with by Jez Brogan, before moving to London to be trained by both Frank Maloney and Alan Smith, along with several visits to America to build on his skills. Wayne worked with Goody Petronelli, the trainer of former world champions Marvelous Marvin Hagler and Steve Collins, at his famous Brockton gym. Wayne came back to his home town to team up with Birmingham's most successful boxing trainers, Paddy and Tommy Lynch. Knocking out fellow contender Darren Rhodes in 1 minute 30 seconds in Elcocks homecoming and first ever fight with the Lynch brothers in Birmingham at a sold out Aston Events Centre, this setting up his first attempt at the prestigious British title Lonsdale Belt against Plymouth's Scott Dann (boxer) in the first British title fight to ever be scored by three judges, after defeat Wayne bounced back with two back to back knockout victories one of them a British title eliminator winning by TKO against Scotland's Lawrence Murphy, who was the only other boxer to have beaten Elcock, In Wayne's next contest he faced the English champion Steven Bendall who was to be yet another stopped, but this time over eight punishing rounds and setting up his next contest where he would become the first British boxer to beat long standing British and Commonwealth champion Howard Eastman to win the coveted Lonsdale Belt in 2007, Elcock also won the Commonwealth title and the minor WBU World Middleweight title becoming the first Birmingham born fighter to ever hold a version of a World title. Elcock challenged for the IBF middleweight title against the unbeaten World champion Arthur Abraham on 8 December 2007, losing by a fifth-round knockout. Wayne bounced back from his world title attempt defending the lonsdale belt with a TKO win against local Dudley rival Darren McDermott, before losing the next defence to fellow Birmingham fighter Matthew Macklin in the Battle of Brum Elcock retired after this contest at the age of 36 with a record of 23 -19 - 9 KO's to concentrate fully on his other businesses, today Wayne can be found mentoring in schools and behind the counter at Mad Dog's Boxing shop located in Sutton Coldfield, Birmingham, as well as coaching in the evening at the multi award-winning company Wayne Elcock's Box Clever and training professional fighters at his Kronk Birmingham gym in Chelmsley Wood, which is not far from where he grew up in Shard End.

== Professional boxing record ==
23 fights	19 wins	4 losses
By knockout	9	3
By decision	10	1

No.	Result	Record	Opponent	Type	Round, time	Date	Location	More
23	Loss	19–4	(United Kingdom) Matthew Macklin Irish boxer	TKO	3 (12), 0:59	14 Mar 2009	(United Kingdom) Aston Villa Events Centre, Birmingham, England	Lost BBBofC British middleweight title
22	Win	19–3	(United Kingdom) Darren McDermott	TKO	2 (12), 0:50	20 Jun 2008	(United Kingdom) Wolverhampton Civic Centre, Wolverhampton, England	Retained BBBofC British middleweight title
21	Loss	18–3	(Germany) Arthur Abraham	TKO	5 (12), 1:58	8 Dec 2007	St. Jakobshalle, Basel, Switzerland	For IBF middleweight title
20	Win	18–2	(Guyana) Howard Eastman	UD	12	28 Sep 2007	(United Kingdom) Coventry Skydome, Coventry, England	Won BBBofC British middleweight title
19	Win	17–2	(United Kingdom) Steve Bendall	TKO	8 (10), 1:30	1 Dec 2006	(United Kingdom) Aston Villa Leisure Centre, Birmingham, England	Won BBBofC English middleweight title
18	Win	16–2	(United Kingdom) Vinnie Baldassara	TKO	6 (10), 1:59	8 Sep 2006	(United Kingdom) International Convention Centre, Birmingham, England	Won vacant WBF International middleweight title
17	Win	15–2	(United Kingdom) Lawrence Murphy	TKO	5 (10), 2:15	6 May 2006	(United Kingdom) International Convention Centre, Birmingham, England	
16	Loss	14–2	(United Kingdom) Scott Dann	UD	12	16 Sep 2005	(United Kingdom) The Pavilions, Plymouth, England	For BBBofC British middleweight title
15	Win	14–1	(United Kingdom) Darren Rhodes	KO	1 (6), 1:45	7 Apr 2005	(United Kingdom) Aston Villa Leisure Centre, Birmingham, England	
14	Win	13–1	(United Kingdom) Michael Monaghan	PTS	4	5 Jun 2004	(United Kingdom) York Hall, London, England	
13	Win	12–1	(Zimbabwe) Farai Musiyiwa	PTS	6	7 Feb 2004	(United Kingdom) York Hall, London, England	
12	Loss	11–1	(United Kingdom) Lawrence Murphy	KO	1 (12), 2:28	29 Nov 2003	(United Kingdom) Braehead Arena, Glasgow, Scotland	Lost WBU middleweight title
11	Win	11–0	(United Kingdom) Anthony Farnell	UD	12	5 Apr 2003	(United Kingdom) MEN Arena, Manchester, England	Won WBU middleweight title
10	Win	10–0	(Belarus) Yuri Tsarenka	PTS	10	15 Feb 2003	(United Kingdom) Wembley Conference Centre, London, England	
9	Win	9–0	(United Kingdom) Jason Collins	TKO	1 (6), 1:53	23 Nov 2002	(United Kingdom) Storm Arena, Derby, England	
8	Win	8–0	(United Kingdom) Ojay Abrahams	PTS	4	17 Aug 2002	(United Kingdom) Cardiff Castle, Cardiff, Wales	
7	Win	7–0	(United Kingdom) Jason Collins	TKO	2 (6), 1:57	1 Jun 2002	(United Kingdom) MEN Arena, Manchester, England	
6	Win	6–0	(United Kingdom) Howard Clarke	PTS	4	20 Apr 2002	(United Kingdom) Motorpoint Arena, Cardiff, Wales	
5	Win	5–0	(United Kingdom) Charles Shodiya	TKO	1 (4), 1:12	2 Mar 2002	(United Kingdom) York Hall, London, England	
4	Win	4–0	(France) Valery Odin	PTS	4	9 Oct 2001	(United Kingdom) Wales National Ice Rink, Cardiff, Wales	
3	Win	3–0	(United Kingdom) Darren Rhodes	PTS	4	7 Jul 2001	(United Kingdom) Manchester Velodrome, Manchester, England	
2	Win	2–0	(United Kingdom) Sonny Pollard	TKO	3 (4), 2:04	4 Mar 2000	(United Kingdom) Werrington Sports Centre, Peterborough, England	
1	Win	1–0	(United Kingdom) William Webster	PTS	6	2 Dec 1999	(United Kingdom) Moat House, Peterborough, England	

== See also ==
- List of British middleweight boxing champions
