= Edwin Rodríguez (boxer) =

Dominican American boxer (born 1985)

Personal information
- Nickname: La Bomba
- Nationality: Dominican
- Born: May 5, 1985 (age 41) Moca, Dominican Republic
- Height: 6 ft 0 in (1.83 m)
- Weight: Super middleweight Light heavyweight Cruiserweight

Boxing career
- Reach: 76 in (190 cm)
- Stance: Orthodox

Boxing record
- Total fights: 33
- Wins: 31
- Win by KO: 20
- Losses: 3
- Draws: 0
- No contests: 0

Edwin Rodríguez (born May 5, 1985) is a Dominican professional boxer who lives in Worcester, Massachusetts.

== Early life ==
Rodriguez moved to Worcester at age 13 with dreams of becoming the next great Dominican ballplayer. The season for outdoor baseball is shorter due to New England's temperate climate. Edwin abandoned aspirations for baseball to take up boxing.

== Amateur career ==
Rodriguez had an 84–9 record and won the USA Boxing Championships 2005 and the National Golden Gloves 2006 as a middleweight (165 pounds). Rodriguez was training for the USA Olympic qualifiers for the 2008 Summer Olympics when his pregnant fiancee delivered twins born 16 weeks premature. Rodriguez chose to dedicate his time to his family and eventually lost in the final qualifier for the Olympic box-offs. Following the Boston Marathon bombing, Rodriguez revealed that he had previously sparred with suspect Tamerlan Tsarnaev in 2010 and expressed regret that he had "slowed down" when he had Tsarnaev hurting 2 rounds into their sparring session.

== Professional career ==
Rodriguez, known by the nickname "La Bomba", turned pro in 2008 for promoter Lou DiBella. Rodriguez is a world-ranked super middleweight (168 pounds). Rodriguez previously trained with Peter Manfredo Sr and currently trains with Ronnie Shields. Rodriguez was managed by Larry Army Jr until the weeks before the Monaco Million Dollar Super Four Tournament, after which the two sides worked out an agreement and announced an amicable split. Rodriguez signed with manager Al Haymon and are in negotiations for his next fight, likely against a title holder and on Showtime. Rodriguez wears Rival gloves, is affiliated with Scientific Nutrition for Advanced Conditioning (SNAC), and has included hypoxic boxing techniques in his training. He has steadily developed into a world title contender with recent wins against previously undefeated Will Rosinsky, Don George, and previously unbeaten Jason Escalera. Rodriguez is currently ranked No. 1 by the WBC, No. 3 by the IBF, No. 3 by the WBA, and No. 7 by The Ring magazine, and has been mentioned as a likely title contender in 2013 or 2014.

=== Monte-Carlo Million Dollar Super Four ===
Rodriguez won the Monaco Million Dollar Super Four Tournament by beating previously undefeated Ezequiel Maderna in a unanimous decision before an impressive first round TKO in the final against Denis Grachev to collect the winner's share on the 60/40 split of the $1 million purse.

=== Victory over Craig Baker ===
On May 23, 2015 Rodriguez defeated Craig Baker by TKO in the third round of a Premier Boxing Champions bout in the Agganis Arena, Boston, televised live on NBC.

=== Victory over Michael Seals ===
On November 13, 2015 Rodriguez defeated Michael Seals by TKO in the third round of a Premier Boxing Champions bout in the Beau Rivage Resort & Casino Biloxi, Mississippi, televised live on Spike TV. Edwin Rodriguez barely survived the first round after being floored twice, but he quickly rallied to stop Michael Seals in the third round, using three knockdowns of his own.

== Professional boxing record ==
34 fights	31 wins	3 losses
By knockout	20	1
By decision	11	2

Result	Record	Opponent	Type	Round, time	Date	Location	Notes
Loss	31–3	(United States) Angel Barrientes	UD	10	2024-07-20	(United States) Amalie Arena, Tampa, Florida	
Win	31–2	(United States) Mitch Williams	UD	10	2019-03-02	(United States) Barclays Center, Brooklyn, New York	
Win	30–2	(United States) Lionell Thompson	UD	10	2018-02-17	(United States) Mandalay Bay Events Center, Paradise, Nevada	
Win	29–2	(United States) Melvin Russell	TKO	2 (8)	2017-07-18	(United States) Rapides Coliseum, Alexandria, Louisiana	
Loss	28–2	(United States) Thomas Williams Jr.	TKO	2 (10), 2:59	2016-04-30	(United States) StubHub Center, Carson, California	
Win	28–1	(United States) Michael Seals	TKO	3 (10), 0:24	2015-11-13	(United States) Beau Rivage Resort & Casino, Biloxi, Mississippi	
Win	27–1	(United States) Craig Baker	TKO	3 (10), 2:22	2015-05-23	(United States) Agganis Arena, Boston, Massachusetts	
Win	26–1	(United States) Derrick Findley	RTD	1 (10), 3:00	2014-12-11	(United States) Pechanga Resort & Casino, Temecula, California	
Win	25–1	(Haiti) Azea Augustama	UD	10	2014-10-18	(United States) StubHub Center, Carson, California	
Loss	24–1	(United States) Andre Ward	UD	12	2013-11-16	(United States) Citizens Business Bank Arena, Ontario, California	Fight was originally for WBA (super) & The Ring Super-Middleweight titles, but Rodriguez failed to make weight
Win	24–0	(Russia) Denis Grachev	TKO	1 (10), 2:50	2013-07-13	Salle des Etoiles, Monte-Carlo, Monaco	Monte-Carlo Million Dollar Super Four Tournament Final.
Win	23–0	(Argentina) Ezequiel Maderna	UD	10	2013-03-30	Salle des Etoiles, Monte-Carlo, Monaco	Monte-Carlo Million Dollar Super Four Tournament Semifinal.
Win	22–0	(United States) Jason Escalera	TKO	8 (10), 0:12	2012-09-29	(United States) Foxwoods Resort Casino, Mashantucket, Connecticut	Retained USBA Super Middleweight title.
Win	21–0	(United States) Don George	UD	10	2012-03-17	(United States) Madison Square Garden, New York City, New York	Won USBA Super Middleweight title.
Win	20–0	(United States) Will Rosinsky	UD	10	2011-10-21	(United States) Foxwoods Resort Casino, Mashantucket, Connecticut	
Win	19–0	(United States) Chris Traietti	RTD	2 (10)	2011-08-20	(United States) Mechanics Hall, Worcester, Massachusetts	
Win	18–0	(United States) Aaron Pryor Jr.	UD	10	2011-01-14	(United States) Mallory Square, Key West, Florida	
Win	17–0	(United States) James McGirt Jr.	UD	9 (10), 1:57	2010-11-05	(United States) Scheels Arena, Fargo, North Dakota	Won vacant USNBC Super Middleweight title.
Win	16–0	(United States) Ibahiem King	TKO	5 (10), 1:06	2010-06-24	(United States) Mechanics Hall, Worcester, Massachusetts	
Win	15–0	(United States) Kevin Engel	KO	6 (8), 2:35	2010-04-30	(United States) UIC Pavilion, Chicago, Illinois	
Win	14–0	(United States) George Armenta	KO	1 (8), 0:47	2010-03-19	(United States) Choctaw Gaming Center, Durant, Oklahoma	
Win	13–0	(United States) Brian Norman	TKO	5 (8), 1:16	2009-11-19	(United States) Main Street Armory, Rochester, New York	
Win	12–0	(United States) Darnell Boone	UD	8	2009-10-03	(United States) Twin River Event Center, Lincoln, Rhode Island	
Win	11–0	(Puerto Rico) Angel David Gonzalez	TKO	3 (6), 1:09	2009-08-13	(United States) Frontier Field, Rochester, New York	
Win	10–0	(United States) Patrick Thompson	TKO	2 (8), 2:11	2009-03-19	(United States) Mechanics Hall, Worcester, Massachusetts	
Win	9–0	(United States) Brad Austin	TKO	3 (8), 1:09	2009-01-17	(United States) Beau Rivage Resort & Casino, Biloxi, Mississippi	
Win	8–0	(United States) Marcus Upshaw	UD	6	2008-08-22	(United States) Twin River Event Center, Lincoln, Rhode Island	
Win	7–0	(Mexico) Hector Hernandez	UD	6	2008-06-28	(United States) Park Plaza Castle, Boston, Massachusetts	
Win	6–0	(United States) Anthony Cannon	TKO	4 (6), 1:07	2008-05-17	(United States) IBEW Freeport Hall, Boston, Massachusetts	
Win	5–0	(United States) Michael Birthmark	TKO	1 (4), 2:46	2008-05-03	(United States) Coeur d'Alene Casino, Worley, Idaho	
Win	4–0	(United States) Jeffrey Osborne Jr	TKO	4 (4), 2:55	2008-04-12	(United States) The Roxy, Boston, Massachusetts	
Win	3–0	(United States) James North	UD	4	2008-03-28	(United States) Seneca Allegany Casino, Salamanca, New York	
Win	2–0	(United States) Fitzgerald Johnson	TKO	4 (4), 2:47	2008-02-08	(United States) Park Plaza Castle, Boston, Massachusetts	
Win	1–0	(United States) Samuel Ortiz Gomez	TKO	1 (4), 1:22	2008-01-26	(United States) Mansfield SportsPlex, Mansfield, Massachusetts	

== Personal life ==
Rodriguez moved to the US from the Dominican Republic in 1998. Rodriguez credits working in his father's convenience store as instrumental in helping him learn English and adjust to life in the US. Rodriguez is father to a twin son and daughter born 23 weeks into his fiancee's pregnancy in 2006. His children faced difficult odds as micro preemies born 16 weeks premature but persevered in large part to their parents' dedication and sacrifice. Rodriguez and his fiancee married in 2010 and welcomed another son in 2013. He starred in the box office hit Bleed For This.

In 2021, Rodriguez was hired as a State Trooper by the Massachusetts State Police

On February 9, 2026, Rodriguez was one of four co-defendants charged with manslaughter over the death of State Police recruit Enrique Delgado-Garcia.
