= Scott Dann (boxer) =

English boxer

Personal information
- Nickname: Dynamite
- Nationality: British
- Born: Scott Anthony Dann; 23 July 1974 (age 52) Plymouth, England
- Height: 5 ft 10 1/2 in (179 cm)
- Weight: Middleweight; Super middleweight

Boxing career
- Reach: 79 in (201 cm)
- Stance: Southpaw

Boxing record
- Total fights: 27
- Wins: 25
- Win by KO: 17
- Losses: 2

Scott "Dynamite" Dann (born 23 July 1974) is a British former professional boxer who competed from 1997 to 2006. He held the British middleweight title from 2004 to 2005 and the Commonwealth middleweight title in 2006. As an amateur, he won the 1996 ABA Championships in the light middleweight division.

Scott Dann was born on 23 July 1974 in Plymouth, England. As a professional he won the English, British, Commonwealth, and IBO Inter-Continental middleweight titles, and challenged Howard Eastman for the British, Commonwealth and EBU European middleweight titles in 2003, losing via third round technical knockout (TKO).
