= The Contender season 3 =

The Contender
- Season 3
- No. of episodes: ?

Release
- Original network: ESPN
- Original release: September 4 – November 6, 2007

Season chronology
- ← Previous; Season 2 Next → Season 4

The Contender 3 is a reality television show based on the sport of boxing, but with an element of the (super middleweight) competitor's lives and relationships with each other within the show's living quarters, based in Pasadena, California. The first episode aired September 4 on ESPN, with a live finale on November 6 at the TD Banknorth Garden in Boston. Full fight matches from the show air as bonus episodes on ESPN2. The programme is broadcast in the United Kingdom on digital television channel ITV4 and TV2 in New Zealand

== Contestants ==
Winner

- Sakio Bika (23-3-2, 15 KOs)The winner of the Contender 3

Contestants in Final

- Sakio Bika (22-3-2, 14 KOs) Vs Jaidon Codrington (17-1, 12 KOs)

Contestants Eliminated

Eliminated in the Semifinals

- Wayne Johnsen (16-1, 9 KOs)
- Sam Soliman (33-9, 13 KOs)

Eliminated in the first episode - did not fight.

- La Farrell Bunting (16-3-1, 16 KOs)
- Les Ralston (16-2, 9 KOs)
- Danny Santiago (29-3-1, 19 KOs)
- Roshii Wells (18-2-2, 10 KOs)
- Rubin Williams (29-2-1, 16 KOs)

Withdrew from the competition - did not fight.

- Henry Buchanan (14-1, 11 KOs)

Lost first fight

- Brian Vera (14-1, 9 KOs)
- Max Alexander (14-0, 2 KOs)
- Miguel Hernandez (20-5, 10 KOs)
- Donny McCrary (23-5-2, 13 KOs)
- David Banks (14-2-1, 2 KOs)

Won first fight, but did not score high enough on the power rankings to make the semifinals

- Paul Smith (20-0, 12 KOs)

As well, he was declared medically un-eligible with a bad cut on his nose.

== Trainers ==
- Buddy McGirt
- Pepe Correa
- Carlos Vargas
- Romnick Dongiapon

== Changes ==
A teaser video for the season shows the boxers undergoing SPARQ testing to evaluate boxing-specific athleticism by measuring punching power, endurance and speed, among other tests.Video on YouTube

== Fight Results ==
- Episode 1
- In the opening episode, six of the contenders were cut from the contest during a three-day period of SPARQ testing, training and sparring contests. The remaining fighters were divided into two teams:
- Blue team (under Pepe Correa): Max Alexander, Sakio Bika, Wayne Johnsen, Paul Smith and Brian Vera
- Gold team (under Buddy McGirt): David Banks, Henry Buchanan, Jaidon Codrington, Donny McCrary and Sam Soliman
- Episode 2
- Henry Buchanan drops out of the contest for personal reasons and is replaced by Miguel Hernandez
- In the first fight of The Contender tournament, Jaidon Codrington defeats Brian Vera by KO in the second round.
- Gold Team 1, Blue Team 0
- Episode 3
- In the second fight of The Contender tournament, Sam Soliman defeats Max Alexander by unanimous decision (50-44, 49-45, 48-46)
- Gold Team 2, Blue Team 0
- Episode 4
- In the third fight of The Contender tournament, Wayne Johnsen defeats Miguel Hernandez by unanimous decision (50-45, 50-45, 48-47)
- Blue Team 1, Gold Team 2
- Episode 5
- In the fourth fight of The Contender tournament, Sakio Bika defeats Donny McCrary by unanimous decision (49-46, 50-45, 50-45)
- Blue Team 2, Gold Team 2
- Episode 6
- The fifth fight of The Contender tournament, Paul Smith defeats David Banks by split decision (48-47, 46-49, 48-47)
- Blue Team 3, Gold Team 2
- Episode 7
- The sixth fight of The Contender tournament, Jaidon Codrington defeats Wayne Johnsen by KO in the first round.
- Blue Team 3, Gold Team 3
- Episode 8
- The seventh fight of The Contender tournament, Sakio Bika defeats Sam Soliman by unanimous decision.
- Blue Team 4, Gold Team 3

== Finale Fight Card ==
- Donny McCrary vs David Banks
- Max Alexander vs Brian Vera
- Miguel Hernandez vs Donny McCrary
- Jaidon Codrington vs Sakio Bika
- Wayne Johnsen vs Sam Soliman
- Sakio Bika vs Jaidon Codrington in the finale to win The Contender 3.

== Guest appearances ==
A number of professional athletes or other celebrities appeared on the show, offering advice to the contestants, including:

- Peter Manfredo Jr.
- Sergio Mora
- Alfonso Gomez
- Adam Carolla
- Oscar De La Hoya
- Steve Forbes
- Kassim Ouma
- Francisco Bojado
