= Sakio Bika vs. Jaidon Codrington =

Boxing competition

Contender 3 Final
- Date: November 6, 2007
- Title(s) on the line: Contender Season 3 Championship

Tale of the tape
Boxer	Jaidon Codrington	Sakio Bika
Nickname	The Don	The Scorpion
Hometown	Queens, New York, United States	Sydney, New South Wales, Australia
Pre-fight record	18-1-0 (14 KO)	24-3-2 (14 KO)
Recognition	New York State Super Middleweight Champion	WBC Super Middleweight Challenger; WBA Super Middleweight Challenger; WBO Super Middleweight Challenger

Sakio Bika versus Jaidon Codrington was a super middleweight boxing contest that was notable for being the final of the 3rd season of the boxing reality show 'The Contender' broadcast on ESPN. The fight took place in Boston's TD Banknorth Garden on November 6, 2007, in front of 6,000 people and offered a prize fund for the winner of $750,000.

== Build-up ==
Jaidon Codrington, a 23-year-old from Queens in New York, entered the tournament with a record of 16 wins with 13 of those wins coming by way of knockout. His only defeat against Allan Green was, however, a brutal one and saw him devastatingly knocked out within the first 18 seconds of the first round. Codrington had also once held the New York State Super Middleweight title.

Sakio Bika was the more experienced of the two, 5 years older and originally from Cameroon, Bika had represented his country at the 2000 Sydney Olympics and now based himself in Australia. Bika became Australian super middleweight champion and eventually fought for the WBO, IBF and WBC versions of the World super middleweight title against the likes of Joe Calzaghe, Lucien Bute and Marcus Beyer. In October 2002 he challenged Sam Soliman for the IBF Pan Pacific title and lost a mixed decision over 10 rounds. Soliman (also an Australian) would later also become a contestant on season 3 of the Contender.

Both boxers had fought twice previously in the tournament with Codrington scoring two knockouts on his way to the final stopping Brian Vera in the 2nd round and Wayne Johnson in the 1st. Bika went the distance with both his opponents beating Donny McCrary over 5 rounds and then beating his former victor Sam Soliman over 8. The tournament represented a chance for both athletes to gain recognition in the sport and to follow in the footsteps of previous Contender winners Sergio Mora and Grady Brewer.

== The fight ==
The fight started in exciting fashion with both boxers going down in the first. Bika was the first to score the knockdown after assaulting Codrington with a 'big hitting early charge'.

"So much heart, so much determination, so much resiliency...Real fighters, real warriors, real contenders."

— Sugar Ray Leonard sitting at ringside ESPN, November 7, 2007

Jaidon managed to recover and later in the round scored a left hook which dropped the African to his knees and left him looking very unsteady for the rest of the round. Both boxers continued to take big shots throughout the fight with Bika in particular throwing huge hooks in wide sweeping arcs eventually wearing down the less experienced man by taking him into the trenches. ESPN's Joe Tessitore commentating on the fight called the action "truly great" and noted at the end of the 5th round "If you don't like this, you don't have a pulse".

The fight, originally scheduled for 10 rounds, was stopped in 2 minutes and 18 seconds of round 8 with Codrington spent and Bika's experience and stamina being the deciding factors. Sugar Ray Leonard sitting at ringside praised the attitude and heart of both fighters saying "So much heart, so much determination, so much resiliency...Real fighters, real warriors, real contenders". Promoter Lou Dibella said the action was like "something out of a Rocky movie".

== Aftermath ==
Following the contest, Codrington took a year out of the ring only returning in November 2008 to defeat journeyman William Gill over 8 rounds. Bika returned to Australia to pick up the vacant IBF super middleweight version of the Pan Pacific title, the title he had failed to win against Soliman in 2002. In November 2008 on the same day Codrington made his comeback, Sakio defeated the runner up from season one of the contender, Peter Manfredo, stopping him in the 3rd round to pick up the IBO super middleweight title.
