= Sakio Bika =

Cameroonian boxer

Sika Bika
Personal information
- Nickname: The Scorpion
- Nationality: Australian
- Born: 18 April 1979 (age 47) Douala, Cameroon
- Height: 1.82 m (6 ft 0 in)
- Weight: Middleweight; Super-middleweight; Light-heavyweight

Boxing career
- Reach: 180 cm (71 in)
- Stance: Orthodox

Boxing record
- Total fights: 45
- Wins: 35
- Win by KO: 22
- Losses: 7
- Draws: 3

Sakio Bika (born 18 April 1979) is a Cameroonian-born Australian professional boxer. He held the WBC super-middleweight title from 2013 to 2014, and previously the IBO super-middleweight title from 2008 to 2010. In 2015 he challenged once for the unified light-heavyweight world title, and in 2007 won the third season of The Contender reality TV series.

== Amateur career ==
As an amateur, Bika was a member of the 2000 Cameroonian Olympic Team as a Light middleweight. He lost to Scott MacIntosh of Canada. Since the 2000 Olympics Bika fights out of Sydney, Australia.

== Professional career ==
Sakio took the opportunity to fight the German champion Markus Beyer for the WBC Super Middleweight world title in Germany in May 2005. After an accidental head clash in round 4 the doctor ruled Beyer unable to continue. Under WBC rules the bout was declared a technical draw. Sakio was awarded all 4 rounds on one judges score card, and the stoppage was considered controversial.

=== Bika vs. Calzaghe ===
On 14 October 2006 Bika challenged Joe Calzaghe at the MEN Arena in Manchester for the IBF and WBO titles. He was defeated unanimously on the score cards by a wide margin.

Bika's then fought undefeated Lucian Bute at the Bell Centre, Montreal, Quebec, Canada. Bute won by unanimous decision in a fight that was an IBF super middleweight title eliminator.

Sakio obtained his Australian citizenship in 2006. Although he bases himself in Sydney, Australia, Bika remains proud of his dual citizenship and his status as an African Australian.

He was one of the featured boxers on the 3rd season of the boxing reality TV series, The Contender, which premiered 4 September 2007 on ESPN. After wins against Donny McCrary and in a rematch with Sam Soliman (the only fighter to defeat Bika other than Calzaghe and Bute), Bika earned a place in the final against Jaidon Codrington at the TD Banknorth Garden in Boston on 6 November.

=== The Contender season 3 ===
On Tuesday, 6 November 2007, Bika knocked out Jaidon Codrington in the championship bout to win The Contender. The fight was wild, with both fighters being knocked down in the first round. In the end, Bika stopped Codrington in the eighth round by referee stoppage (TKO). Bika walked away with $750,000 in prize money.

After the Codrington fight, Bika returned to the ring in Australia with a first-round KO of Argentinian Gustavo Javier Kapusi. Bika won the fight right at the end of the round with a body shot.

Bika returned to the ring on 13 November 2008, in a fight with former season one contestant Peter Manfredo Jr at the Dunkin' Donuts Center. Bika won by TKO in round 3. With the win, Bika became the International Boxing Organization super middleweight champion.

Bika fought Jean Paul Mendy on 31 July in Las Vegas, for an IBF #1 spot and a shot at the title. Bika lost the fight by disqualification in the 1st round after he hit Mendy following a knockdown and while Mendy was still on his knees.

=== Bika vs. Ward ===
After the Mendy fight Bika was given a shot at unbeaten WBA super middleweight champion Andre Ward, A voluntary defence by Ward after he defeated Allan Green. Bika used a fast pace a threw a total of 612 punches (400 of which were power shots) landing 201, however this was not enough to ruffle the champion who used defence and counter punching to land clean and effective blows throughout. Winning on all three scorecards Ward took a dominant decision with scores of 120–108, 118–110, 118–110, handing Bika his fifth loss.

On 2 June 2012, on the undercard of Antonio Tarver vs Lateef Kayode, Bika fought Dyah Davis, the son of Olympic gold medalist Howard Davis. Bika dominated the fight, stopping Davis in round 10 to win the NABF and WBO inter-continental super middleweight titles.

He defeated Nikola Sjekloca via unanimous decision in a WBC Eliminator.

=== WBC super-middleweight champion ===
On 22 June 2013, on the undercard of Adrien Broner vs. Paulie Malignaggi, Bika defeated Marco Antonio Peribán via 12-round majority decision to win the vacant WBC super middleweight title.

Bika had his first defense of the WBC super middleweight on 7 December 2013 undercard of Paulie Malignaggi vs. Zab Judah. He retained his title after earning a split draw against Anthony Dirrell.

On 16 August 2014, at the StubHub Center in Carson, California, Bika faced Dirrell in a championship rematch. After 12 rounds, the judges awarded the fight and the title to Dirrell by unanimous decision.

== Professional boxing record ==
| 45 fights | 35 wins | 7 losses |
|---|---|---|
| By knockout | 22 | 0 |
| By decision | 12 | 6 |
| By disqualification | 1 | 1 |
| Draws | 3 | |

| No. | Result | Record | Opponent | Type | Round, time | Date | Location | Notes |
|---|---|---|---|---|---|---|---|---|
| 45 | Win | 35–7–3 | Sam Soliman | UD | 8 | 31 Mar 2021 | Entertainment Centre, Newcastle, Australia | |
| 44 | Win | 34–7–3 | Geard Ajetović | UD | 12 | 22 Oct 2017 | Star City Casino, Sydney, Australia | Won vacant WBC Silver International super-middleweight title |
| 43 | Win | 33–7–3 | Luke Sharp | TKO | 7 (12) | 8 Jul 2017 | Fairy Meadow Fraternity Club, Wollongong, Australia | Won vacant WBC–ABCO Continental super-middleweight title |
| 42 | Loss | 32–7–3 | Adonis Stevenson | UD | 12 | 4 Apr 2015 | Colisée Pepsi, Quebec City, Quebec, Canada | For WBC and The Ring light-heavyweight titles |
| 41 | Loss | 32–6–3 | Anthony Dirrell | UD | 12 | 16 Aug 2014 | StubHub Center, Carson, California, US | Lost WBC super-middleweight title |
| 40 | Draw | 32–5–3 | Anthony Dirrell | SD | 12 | 7 Dec 2013 | Barclays Center, New York City, New York, US | Retained WBC super-middleweight title |
| 39 | Win | 32–5–2 | Marco Antonio Peribán | MD | 12 | 22 Jun 2013 | Barclays Center, New York City, New York, US | Won vacant WBC super-middleweight title |
| 38 | Win | 31–5–2 | Nikola Sjekloća | UD | 12 | 16 Feb 2013 | Boardwalk Hall, Atlantic City, New Jersey, US | |
| 37 | Win | 30–5–2 | Dyah Davis | TKO | 10 (10), 1:40 | 2 Jun 2012 | Home Depot Center, Carson, California, US | Won NABF and vacant WBO Inter-Continental super-middleweight titles |
| 36 | Win | 29–5–2 | Alfredo Contreras | RTD | 3 (8), 3:00 | 3 Dec 2011 | Honda Center, Anaheim, California, US | |
| 35 | Loss | 28–5–2 | Andre Ward | UD | 12 | 27 Nov 2010 | Oracle Arena, Oakland, California, US | For WBA (Super) super-middleweight title |
| 34 | Loss | 28–4–2 | Jean-Paul Mendy | DQ | 1 (12), 1:18 | 31 Jul 2010 | Mandalay Bay Events Center, Paradise, Nevada, US | Bika disqualified for hitting after a knockdown |
| 33 | Win | 28–3–2 | Nestor Fabian Casanova | KO | 1 (8), 1:27 | 30 Jul 2009 | Orion Function Centre, Sydney, Australia | |
| 32 | Win | 27–3–2 | Peter Manfredo Jr. | TKO | 3 (12), 1:50 | 13 Nov 2008 | Dunkin' Donuts Center, Providence, Rhode Island, US | Won vacant IBO super-middleweight title |
| 31 | Win | 26–3–2 | Gustavo Javier Kapusi | KO | 1 (12), 2:59 | 11 Apr 2008 | Endeavour Field, Sydney, Australia | Won vacant IBF Pan Pacific super-middleweight title |
| 30 | Win | 25–3–2 | Jaidon Codrington | TKO | 8 (10), 2:18 | 6 Nov 2007 | TD Banknorth Garden, Boston, Massachusetts, US | The Contender: season finale |
| 29 | Win | 24–3–2 | Sam Soliman | UD | 8 | 30 Oct 2007 | Contender Arena, Los Angeles, California, US | The Contender: semi-final |
| 28 | Win | 23–3–2 | Donny McCrary | UD | 5 | 2 Oct 2007 | Contender Arena, Los Angeles, California, US | The Contender: first round |
| 27 | Loss | 22–3–2 | Lucian Bute | UD | 12 | 15 Jun 2007 | Bell Centre, Montreal, Quebec, Canada | |
| 26 | Win | 22–2–2 | Andre Thysse | UD | 12 | 4 Feb 2007 | State Sports Centre, Sydney, Australia | Retained IBF Australasian super-middleweight title |
| 25 | Win | 21–2–2 | Dechapon Suwunnalird | TKO | 2 (12), 1:58 | 8 Dec 2006 | Ex-Services Club, Coffs Harbour, Australia | Won vacant IBF Australasian super-middleweight title |
| 24 | Loss | 20–2–2 | Joe Calzaghe | UD | 12 | 14 Oct 2006 | MEN Arena, Manchester, England | For IBF, WBO, and The Ring super-middleweight titles |
| 23 | Draw | 20–1–2 | Markus Beyer | TD | 4 (12), 1:45 | 13 May 2006 | Stadthalle, Zwickau, Germany | For WBC super-middleweight title; Majority TD after Beyer cut from accidental head clash |
| 22 | Win | 20–1–1 | Yoshihiro Araki | KO | 5 (12), 2:22 | 22 Nov 2005 | Prefectural Gymnasium, Osaka, Japan | Retained OPBF middleweight title |
| 21 | Win | 19–1–1 | Juarne Dowling | TKO | 6 (10), 2:35 | 1 Apr 2005 | Panthers World of Entertainment, Penrith, Australia | |
| 20 | Win | 18–1–1 | Yoshihiro Araki | TKO | 10 (12), 2:23 | 18 Oct 2004 | Prefectural Gymnasium, Osaka, Japan | Won vacant OPBF middleweight title |
| 19 | Win | 17–1–1 | Rico Chong Nee | UD | 6 | 15 Aug 2004 | State Sports Centre, Sydney, Australia | |
| 18 | Win | 16–1–1 | Joel Bourke | TKO | 5 (10), 2:37 | 2 Apr 2004 | State Sports Centre, Sydney, Australia | Retained Australian middleweight title |
| 17 | Win | 15–1–1 | Ramon Arturo Britez | UD | 8 | 31 Oct 2003 | Panthers World of Entertainment, Penrith, Australia | |
| 16 | Win | 14–1–1 | Moechrody | KO | 2 (10), 2:52 | 12 Sep 2003 | Central Coast Stadium, Gosford, Australia | |
| 15 | Win | 13–1–1 | John Wayne Parr | UD | 12 | 13 Jun 2003 | Auburn RSL Club, Sydney, Australia | Retained Australian middleweight title |
| 14 | Win | 12–1–1 | Arama Tabuai | TKO | 2 (12) | 11 Apr 2003 | Panthers World of Entertainment, Penrith, Australia | Won vacant Australian middleweight title |
| 13 | Win | 11–1–1 | Sergio Llancafilo | TKO | 5 (6) | 15 Mar 2003 | Challenge Stadium, Perth, Australia | |
| 12 | Draw | 10–1–1 | Harmen Ajadato | TD | 3 (10) | 20 Dec 2002 | Ngurah Rai Stadium, Denpasar, Indonesia | TD after Ajadato cut from accidental head clash |
| 11 | Loss | 10–1 | Sam Soliman | MD | 12 | 15 Oct 2002 | Albert Park Powerhouse, Melbourne, Australia | For IBF Pan Pacific middleweight title |
| 10 | Win | 10–0 | Mike Cope | UD | 6 | 9 Aug 2002 | Albert Park Powerhouse, Melbourne, Australia | |
| 9 | Win | 9–0 | Brown Enyi | KO | 2 (6) | 10 May 2002 | Enmore Theatre, Sydney, Australia | |
| 8 | Win | 8–0 | Eni Latu | KO | 3 (6) | 10 May 2002 | Central Coast Stadium, Gosford, Australia | |
| 7 | Win | 7–0 | Rasheed Baloch | KO | 4 (6), 2:11 | 8 Feb 2002 | Le Montage Function Centre, Sydney, Australia | |
| 6 | Win | 6–0 | Manueli Delaitabua | TKO | 3 (6) | 16 Nov 2001 | Nineveh Club, Sydney, Australia | |
| 5 | Win | 5–0 | Saimoni Taudomo | KO | 2 (6) | 3 Aug 2001 | Dapto Canaries, Wollongong, Australia | |
| 4 | Win | 4–0 | Kamel Chater | PTS | 4 | 3 Aug 2001 | Bellevue Function Centre, Sydney, Australia | |
| 3 | Win | 3–0 | Waqa Kolivuso | KO | 2 (4) | 4 May 2001 | RSL Club, Wyong, Australia | |
| 2 | Win | 2–0 | Leo Christou | TKO | 2 (6) | 20 Apr 2001 | Le Montage Function Centre, Sydney, Australia | |
| 1 | Win | 1–0 | Ivan Vakulyuk | DQ | 4 (6) | 15 Dec 2000 | Manly-Warringah Sea Eagles Leagues Club, Sydney, Australia | |

Sporting positions
Regional boxing titles
| Vacant Title last held by Ian McLeod | Australian middleweight champion 11 April 2003 – December 2004; Vacated | Vacant Title next held by Daniel Dawson |
| Vacant Title last held by Sam Soliman | OPBF middleweight champion 18 October 2004 – May 2006; Vacated | Vacant Title next held by Pradeep Singh Sihag |
| New title | IBF Australasian super-middleweight champion 8 December 2006 – June 2007; Vacated | Vacant Title next held by Kariz Kariuki |
| Vacant Title last held by Nader Hamdan | IBF Pan Pacific super-middleweight champion 11 April 2008 – November 2008; Vacated | Vacant Title next held by Shannan Taylor |
| Preceded by Dyah Davis | NABF super-middleweight champion 2 June 2012 – February 2013; Vacated | Vacant Title next held by Marco Antonio Peribán |
| Vacant Title last held by James DeGale | WBO Inter-Continental super-middleweight champion 2 June 2012 – February 2013; Vacated | Vacant Title next held by Arthur Abraham |
| Vacant Title last held by Ryan Breese | WBC–ABCO Continental super-middleweight champion 8 July 2017 – September 2018; Vacated | Vacant Title next held by Aidos Yerbossynuly |
| Vacant Title last held by Avni Yıldırım | WBC International Silver super-middleweight champion 22 October 2017 – October 2018; Vacated | Vacant Title next held by Ramil Gadzhyiev |
Minor world boxing titles
| Vacant Title last held by Fulgencio Zúñiga | IBO super-middleweight champion 13 November 2008 – June 2010; Vacated | Vacant Title next held by Isaac Chilemba |
Major world boxing titles
| Vacant Title last held by Andre Ward | WBC super-middleweight champion 22 June 2013 – 16 August 2014 | Succeeded by Anthony Dirrell |
Achievements
| Previous: Grady Brewer | The Contender series 3 champion 2007 | Next: Troy Amos-Ross |
