= Brian Vera =

American boxer (born 1981)

Personal information
- Born: Bryan Lee Vera; December 28, 1981 (age 44) Fort Worth, Texas, U.S.
- Height: 6 ft 0 in (183 cm)
- Weight: Light middleweight Middleweight; Super middleweight Light heavyweight

Boxing career
- Reach: 74 in (189 cm)
- Stance: Orthodox

Boxing record
- Total fights: 45
- Wins: 28
- Win by KO: 18
- Losses: 17

Bryan Lee Vera (born December 28, 1981) is an American professional boxer currently competing as a super middleweight. He is best known for his memorable and notable victories over then-undefeated Andy Lee in 2008, former world champion Sergio Mora (twice, in 2011 and 2012) and Serhiy Dzinziruk in 2013. Vera currently trains in Cedar Park, Texas.

== Early life and education ==
Vera attended Westwood High School and lettered in football, a sport he had played since a child in Pop Warner. His brother, Gilbert "Boogie" Vera, is a professional boxer, and his father was a two-time IBA champion in the heavyweight division.

== Amateur career ==
Vera's amateur career saw him clash with (among others), Jonathon Banks (in a losing effort), and then saw him returning in December 2005 (after beginning his professional career in 2004), when he returned for one last amateur fight against Ivan Stovell (in a losing effort).

== Professional career ==
Vera began his professional career in 2004 with a four-round unanimous decision win over Avien Cooper. He would win his next thirteen bouts, including a decision victory over Darnell Boone (who would later knockout the future lineal light heavyweight champion Adonis Stevenson), before signing up with the ESPN television series The Contender.

=== The Contender ===
He is one of the featured boxers on the third season of the boxing reality TV series, The Contender, which premiered September 4, 2007, on ESPN. Vera suffered his first professional loss in the opening fight of the contest to the shows runner-up Jaidon Codrington.

=== Vera vs. Lee ===
In 2008, Vera fought then-undefeated and highly touted prospect Andy Lee. In a fight that he was supposed to lose according to most critics, Brian Vera pulled up the upset win and would defeat Lee by TKO in the seventh round. Although the stoppage was regarded as controversial, Vera was behind on points up until that point, though Lee himself appeared to be battered and exhausted from Vera's relentless assault in the 7th.

=== Vera vs. Kirkland ===
Vera's career would hit a standstill soon after when he was matched against light-middleweight contender James Kirkland. Kirkland was vicious in his assault against Vera, battering his outmatched opponent all over the ring for the duration of the fight. Vera was knocked down twice in preceding rounds before the faithful eight round, in which a devastating combination from Kirkland put Vera down for a third time. Vera managed to rise up, but was immediately cornered and beaten on until referee Vic Drakulich called a halt to the match, with Vera losing by an eighth-round technical knockout. In the match, Kirkland had managed to land 283 out of 532 thrown punches, whereas Vera only landed 64 out of 470.

Vera only fought once in 2009, losing a definitive decision to Craig McEwan. McEwan was landing combinations nearly at will from the start of the fight, and Vera had no answer for his opponent's boxing ability. In 2010 Vera would go 1–2, first losing a unanimous decision against Isaac Rodrigues before scoring a third-round technical knockout over Sebastien Demers, and finally dropping a twelve-round unanimous decision to middleweight contender Max Bursak.

On February 4, 2011, Vera would defeat fellow Contender competitor Sergio Mora. Vera would win a close but definitive split decision over Mora, and followed up his success with an eighth-round knockout over Eloy Suarez.

=== Vera vs. Lee II ===
Later that year Vera would rematch his old foe Andy Lee, this time losing by a wide margin. Lee used his height and reach to excellent effect, keeping the bullish Vera off of him all night, and even scoring a knockdown in the second. Lee displayed excellent boxing tactics and skills by controlling the distance of the fight and continuously blasting Vera with power punches from all angles.

=== Vera vs. Chávez Jr. I-II ===
Vera would score four more wins following his defeat to Andy Lee, including a wide unanimous decision against former foe Sergio Mora, as well as a technical knockout victory over Serhiy Dzinziruk before being matched against former WBC middleweight champion Julio César Chávez, Jr. Vera surprised many when he dominated the bout, easily outboxing and out-landing his much larger and sluggish foe. When it was announced after the fight that Chavez had won a unanimous decision, the decision was roundly booed. It was later revealed that not one press row scorer had scored the bout for Chávez Jr., all scoring it definitively for Vera.

Chávez Jr. and Vera would rematch six months later over a twelve-round bout. This time Chavez would use his size and strength more effectively, outboxing and outscoring Vera with relative ease. Vera would lose a far clearer unanimous decision.

== Professional boxing record ==
45 fights	28 wins	17 losses
By knockout	18	5
By decision	10	12

Key to abbreviations used for results
DQ	Disqualification	RTD	Corner retirement
KO	Knockout	SD	Split decision / split draw
MD	Majority decision / majority draw	TD	Technical decision / technical draw
NC	No contest	TKO	Technical knockout
PTS	Points decision	UD	Unanimous decision / unanimous draw

Boxing record
No.	Result	Record	Opponent	Type	Round(s)	Time	Date	Location	Notes
45	Loss	28–17	(United States) Kendrick Ball Jr	UD	8	N/a	17 Apr 2021	(United States) New England Sports Center, Derry, New Hampshire, U.S.	For vacant WBC USA Silver super middleweight title
44	Win	28–16	(United States) Francisco Ariri Neto	TKO	1 (4)	1:24	14 Nov 2020	(United States) New England Sports Center, Derry, New Hampshire, U.S.	
43	Win	27–16	(United States) Mike Anderson	KO	1 (4)	1:01	29 Aug 2020	(United States) New England Sports Center, Derry, New Hampshire, U.S.	
42	Loss	26–16	(Egypt) Ahmed Elbiali	TKO	6 (10)	1:15	28 Dec 2019	(United States) State Farm Arena, Atlanta, Georgia, U.S.	
41	Loss	26–15	(United States) Marcus McDaniel	UD	6	N/a	9 Feb 2019	(United States) New Orleans, Louisiana, U.S.	
40	Loss	26–14	(Ghana) Sena Agbeko	UD	8	N/a	8 Dec 2018	(United States) Mid-TN Expo, Murfreesboro, Tennessee, U.S.	
39	Loss	26–13	(United States) Jas Phipps	UD	6	N/a	8 Dec 2017	(United States) Round Rock Sports Center, Round Rock, Texas, U.S.	
38	Loss	26–12	(United States) Mike Gavronski	TKO	6 (10)	2:21	9 Sep 2017	(United States) Emerald Queen Casino, Tacoma, Washington, U.S.	
37	Win	26–11	(Colombia) Milton Núñez	RTD	5 (8)	3:00	24 Jun 2017	(United States) San Antonio Shrine Auditorium, San Antonio, Texas, U.S.	align=left|Won vacant Texas light-heavyweight title (Texas Combative Sports Program)
36	Win	25–11	(United States) Larry Smith	TKO	2 (6)	2:10	11 Jan 2017	(United States) Alzafar Shrine, San Antonio, Texas, U.S.	
35	Win	24–11	(Mexico) Juan Carlos Rojas	MD	6	N/a	15 Oct 2016	(United States) Zaragoza Park, Austin, Texas, U.S.	
34	Loss	23–11	(Russia) Matvey Korobov	UD	8	N/a	26 Jun 2016	(United States) The Bomb Factory, Dallas, Texas, U.S.	
33	Loss	23–10	(United Kingdom) Rocky Fielding	TKO	2 (12)	1:39	26 Jun 2015	(United Kingdom) Echo Arena, Liverpool, Merseyside, UK	For WBC International Silver super middleweight title
32	Loss	23–9	(United States) Willie Monroe Jr.	UD	10	N/a	16 Jan 2015	(United States) Turning Stone Resort & Casino, New York, U.S.	For NABA & NABO middleweight titles
31	Loss	23–8	(Mexico) Julio César Chávez Jr.	UD	12	N/a	1 Mar 2014	(United States) Alamodome, San Antonio, Texas, U.S.	
30	Loss	23–7	(Mexico) Julio César Chávez Jr.	UD	10	N/a	28 Sep 2013	(United States) StubHub Center, Carson, California, U.S.	
29	Win	23–6	(Lithuania) Donatas Bondorovas	RTD	7 (10)	3:00	29 Mar 2013	(United States) Turning Stone Resort & Casino, Verona, New York, U.S.	Retained NABO middleweight title
28	Win	22–6	(Ukraine) Serhiy Dzinziruk	TKO	10 (12)	1:50	25 Jan 2013	(United States) Turning Stone Resort & Casino, Verona, New York, U.S.	Retained NABO middleweight title
27	Win	21–6	(United States) Sergio Mora	MD	12	N/a	11 Aug 2012	(United States) Illusions Theater, San Antonio, Texas, U.S.	Won vacant NABO middleweight title
26	Win	20–6	(United States) Taronze Washington	UD	8	N/a	21 Apr 2012	(United States) Convention Center, Fort Worth, Texas, U.S.	Won vacant WPBF International middleweight title
25	Loss	19–6	(Republic of Ireland) Andy Lee	UD	10	N/a	1 Oct 2011	(United States) Boardwalk Hall, Atlantic City, New Jersey, U.S.	
24	Win	19–5	(Mexico) Eloy Suarez	KO	8 (8)	0:30	24 Jun 2011	(United States) Dr Pepper Arena, Frisco, Texas, U.S.	
23	Win	18–5	(United States) Sergio Mora	SD	10	N/a	4 Feb 2011	(United States) Convention Center, Fort Worth, Texas, U.S.	
22	Loss	17–5	(Ukraine) Max Bursak	UD	12	N/a	4 Sep 2010	Sportpalace Meteor, Dnipropetrovsk, Ukraine	
21	Win	17–4	(Canada) Sebastien Demers	TKO	3 (10)	1:57	11 Jun 2010	Uniprix Stadium, Montreal, Quebec, Canada	
20	Loss	16–4	(Brazil) Isaac Rodrigues	MD	10	N/a	6 Feb 2010	(United States) Turning Stone Resort & Casino, Verona, New York, U.S.	
19	Loss	16–3	(United Kingdom) Craig McEwan	UD	10	N/a	8 May 2009	(United States) Sundance Square, Fort Worth, Texas, U.S.	
18	Loss	16–2	(United States) James Kirkland	TKO	8 (10)	1:45	22 Nov 2008	(United States) MGM Grand Garden Arena, Las Vegas, Nevada, U.S.	
17	Win	16–1	(Republic of Ireland) Andy Lee	TKO	7 (10)	2:17	21 Mar 2008	(United States) Mohegan Sun Casino, Uncasville, Connecticut, U.S.	
16	Win	15–1	(United States) Max Alexander	UD	6	N/a	6 Nov 2007	(United States) TD Banknorth Garden, Boston, Massachusetts, U.S.	
15	Loss	14–1	(United States) Jaidon Codrington	KO	2 (5)	1:32	8 Sep 2007	(United States) Contender Arena, Los Angeles, California, U.S.	Fight aired as part of ESPN2's "The Contender" series.
14	Win	14–0	(United States) Darnell Boone	UD	10	N/a	15 Jun 2007	(United States) Chevrolet Centre, Youngstown, Ohio, U.S.	Retained IBA Intercontinental super middleweight title
13	Win	13–0	(Colombia) Samuel Miller	MD	10	N/a	11 May 2007	(United States) Buffalo Run Casino, Miami, Oklahoma, U.S.	
12	Win	12–0	(United States) Etianne Whitaker	TKO	3 (10)	1:58	4 Nov 2006	(United States) Coushatta Casino Resort, Kinder, Louisiana, U.S.	Won vacant IBA Intercontinental super middleweight title
11	Win	11–0	(Mexico) Antonio Garcia	KO	3 (8)	?	18 Aug 2006	(United States) American Airlines Center, Dallas, Texas, U.S.	
10	Win	10–0	(United States) Marcus Hicks	TKO	5 (8)	2:05	9 Jun 2006	(United States) Sundance Square, Fort Worth, Texas, U.S.	Won vacant United States Texas State middleweight title
9	Win	9–0	(Mexico) Antonio Garcia	UD	8	N/a	16 Feb 2006	(United States) Cowtown Coliseum, Fort Worth, Texas, U.S.	
8	Win	8–0	(United States) Jeremiah Chapman	KO	2 (6)	0:40	16 Dec 2005	(United States) Austin Convention Center, Austin, Texas, U.S.	
7	Win	7–0	(United States) Cardyl Finley	KO	1 (8)	2:47	26 Nov 2005	(United States) Music Hall, Austin, Texas, U.S.	
6	Win	6–0	(United States) Freeman Taft	TKO	2 (6)	2:05	22 Jul 2005	(United States) Gold Coast Hotel & Casino, Las Vegas, Nevada, U.S.	
5	Win	5–0	(United States) Trenice Brown	TKO	3 (6)	2:36	16 Jun 2005	(United States) Sundance Square, Fort Worth, Texas, U.S.	
4	Win	4–0	(United States) Javier Diaz	UD	4	N/a	17 Mar 2005	(United States) Cowtown Coliseum, Fort Worth, Texas, U.S.	
3	Win	3–0	(United States) Juan Jose Ruiz	TKO	2 (4)	1:10	26 Feb 2005	(United States) Dodge Arena, Hidalgo, Texas, U.S.	
2	Win	2–0	(United States) Bert Montez	TKO	2 (4)	?	30 Sep 2004	(United States) Frank Erwin Center, Austin, Texas, U.S.	
1	Win	1–0	(United States) Avien Cooper	UD	4	N/a	27 Aug 2004	(United States) Renaissance Worthington Hotel, Fort Worth, Texas, U.S.	Professional debut

== Big Knockout Boxing record ==
0 Wins, 1 Loss, 0 Draws
Res.	Record	Opponent	Type	Rd, Time	Date	Location	Event	Notes
Loss	0–1	(United States) Gabriel Rosado	TKO	6 (7), 1:59	2014-08-16	(United States) Mandalay Bay Resort & Casino, Las Vegas, Nevada	BKB 1	For vacant BKB Middleweight title.
