= Dhafir Smith =

American boxer

Personal information
- Nickname: No Fear
- Nationality: American
- Born: September 23, 1982 (age 43) Philadelphia, Pennsylvania
- Height: 6 ft 1 in (185 cm)
- Weight: Light heavyweight Super middleweight

Boxing career
- Reach: 72 in (183 cm)
- Stance: Orthodox

Boxing record
- Total fights: 59
- Wins: 27
- Win by KO: 4
- Losses: 25
- Draws: 7
- No contests: 0

Dhafir Smith (born September 23, 1982) is an American professional boxer.

== Professional career ==
In December 2010, Smith had a huge upset over former world champion Jeff Lacy.

On March 18, 2011 Smith lost to Jesús González in a bout for the vacant IBF North American super middleweight title. González was coming off of an almost three year layoff.

== Professional boxing record ==
59 fights	27 wins	25 losses
By knockout	4	4
By decision	23	21
Draws	7	

No.	Result	Record	Opponent	Type	Round, time	Date	Location	Notes
59	Loss	27–25–7	(United States) Tommy Karpency	UD	6	2014-05-09	(United States) The Meadows Racetrack and Casino, Washington, Pennsylvania, U.S.	For vacant NABA-USA & vacant USA Pennsylvania State Light heavyweight titles.
58	Win	27–24–7	(United States) Brian Donahue	UD	6	2014-05-09	(United States) Harrah's Philadelphia, Chester, Pennsylvania, U.S.	
57	Loss	26–24–7	(United States) Anthony Caputo Smith	MD	10	2013-04-19	(United States) Harrah's Philadelphia, Chester, Pennsylvania, U.S.	Lost USA Pennsylvania State Light heavyweight title
56	Loss	26–23–7	(Cuba) Umberto Savigne	UD	10	2012-11-30	(United States) BB&T Center, Sunrise, Florida, U.S.	For WBA Fedelatin Light heavyweight title
55	Win	26–22–7	(United States) Anthony Ferrante	UD	10	2012-05-04	(United States) Harrah's Philadelphia, Chester, Pennsylvania, U.S.	Won vacant USA Pennsylvania State Light heavyweight title
54	Win	25–22–7	(United States) Quinton Rankin	UD	6	2012-01-28	(United States) First District Plaza, Philadelphia, Pennsylvania, U.S.	
53	Loss	24–22–7	(Mexico) Marco Antonio Periban	UD	8	2011-09-17	(United States) MGM Grand Garden Arena, Las Vegas, Nevada, U.S.	
52	Loss	24–21–7	(United States) Cornelius White	SD	6	2011-07-09	(United States) Boardwalk Hall, Atlantic City, New Jersey, U.S.	
51	Loss	24–20–7	(United States) Jesús González	UD	12	2011-03-18	(United States) Celebrity Theatre, Phoenix, Arizona, U.S.	For vacant IBF North American Super middleweight title
50	Win	24–19–7	(United States) Jeff Lacy	UD	12	2010-12-11	(United States) Jannus Landing, Saint Petersburg, Florida, U.S.	Won vacant UBO International Super middleweight title
49	Win	23–19–7	(Venezuela) Marcos Primera	UD	6	2010-06-18	(United States) Benton Convention Center, Winston-Salem, North Carolina, U.S.	
48	Draw	22–19–7	(United States) Joe McCreedy	SD	6	2010-03-19	(United States) Twin River Event Center, Lincoln, Rhode Island, U.S.	
47	Win	22–19–6	(United States) Demetrius Davis	SD	8	2009-09-26	(United States) Yesha Center, Philadelphia, Pennsylvania, U.S.	
46	Win	21–19–6	(United States) William Gill	UD	6	2009-05-09	(United States) South Philadelphia High School, Philadelphia, Pennsylvania, U.S.	
45	Loss	20–19–6	(United States) Jerson Ravelo	UD	8	2008-11-19	(United States) Robert Treat Hotel, Newark, New Jersey, U.S.	
44	Loss	20–18–6	(Niger) Kingsley Ikeke	SD	6	2008-06-13	(United States) Connecticut Convention Center, Hartford, Connecticut, U.S.	
43	Loss	20–17–6	(Canada) Adonis Stevenson	TKO	5 (12), 0:40	2008-04-05	Montreal Casino, Montreal, Quebec, Canada	For vacant WBC Continental Americas Super middleweight title
42	Win	20–16–6	(United States) Rayco Saunders	UD	8	2008-02-08	(United States) Dover Downs, Dover, Delaware, U.S.	
41	Win	19–16–6	(United States) John Johnson	UD	8	2007-12-01	(United States) SEFCU Arena, Albany, New York, U.S.	
40	Draw	18–16–6	(United States) Larry Marks	PTS	8	2007-09-27	(United States) Delaware Park Racetrack, Stanton, Delaware, U.S.	
39	Win	18–16–5	(United States) Jonathan Reid	SD	6	2007-08-24	(United States) New Alhambra Arena, Philadelphia, Pennsylvania, U.S.	
38	Win	17–16–5	(United States) Brandon Mitchem	TKO	4 (6), 2:44	2007-07-27	(United States) City Center, Saratoga Springs, New York, U.S.	
37	Loss	16–16–5	(United States) Andre Ward	TKO	6 (8), 2:47	2007-05-17	(United States) Tachi Palace Hotel & Casino, Lemoore, California, U.S.	
36	Draw	16–15–5	(United States) Omar Pittman	PTS	6	2007-01-11	(United States) New Alhambra Arena, Philadelphia, Pennsylvania, U.S.	
35	Loss	16–15–4	(United States) Curtis Stevens	UD	10	2006-12-01	(United States) Vernon Downs, Vernon, New York, U.S.	For USA New York State Light heavyweight title
34	Win	16–14–4	(United States) Kippy Warren	MD	10	2006-10-27	(United States) RBC Center, Raleigh, North Carolina, U.S.	
33	Draw	15–14–4	(United States) Mike Paschall	PTS	8	2006-10-20	(United States) National Guard Armory, Pikesville, Maryland, U.S.	
32	Win	15–14–3	(United States) Henry Mayes	UD	6	2006-08-12	(United States) Convention Center, Ocean City, Maryland, U.S.	
31	Win	14–14–3	(United States) Lamont Cooper	UD	4	2006-06-14	(United States) Dover Downs, Dover, Delaware, U.S.	
30	Draw	13–14–3	(United States) Nick Cook	PTS	6	2006-05-26	(United States) Resorts Casino, East Chicago, Indiana, U.S.	
29	Loss	13–14–2	(United States) Jameson Bostic	MD	6	2006-05-04	(United States) Michael's Eighth Avenue, Glen Burnie, Maryland, U.S.	
28	Loss	13–13–2	(United States) Henry Buchanan	UD	8	2005-11-26	(United States) The Show Place Arena, Upper Marlboro, Maryland, U.S.	
27	Loss	13–12–2	(United States) James McCallister	UD	8	2005-11-04	(United States) Boxing Xtreme Fitness, Millersville, Maryland, U.S.	
26	Loss	13–11–2	(United States) Derrick Whitley	UD	8	2005-09-17	(United States) Dana Barros Sports Complex, Mansfield, Massachusetts, U.S.	
25	Loss	13–10–2	(United States) Wayne Johnsen	UD	6	2005-08-19	(United States) Hanover Marriott, Whippany, New Jersey, U.S.	
24	Loss	13–9–2	(United States) Max Alexander	UD	4	2005-06-24	(United States) The Blue Horizon, Philadelphia, Pennsylvania, U.S.	
23	Loss	13–8–2	(United States) Charles Cavallo	UD	6	2005-05-06	(United States) Worlds Gym, Philadelphia, Pennsylvania, U.S.	
22	Loss	13–7–2	(Poland) Dawid Kostecki	UD	10	2004-12-19	Rzeszów, Poland	WBC Youth Light heavyweight title
21	Win	13–6–2	(United States) Deandre McCole	UD	6	2004-07-14	(United States) Lagoon Nightclub, Essington, Pennsylvania, U.S.	
20	Loss	12–6–2	(Russia) Artur Shekhmurzov	TKO	5 (10), 1:55	2004-04-30	Hotel Saint Petersburg, Saint Petersburg, Russia	For WBC Youth Super middleweight title
19	Loss	12–5–2	(United States) Shaun George	UD	6	2004-03-26	(United States) Miccosukee Indian Gaming Resort, Miami, Florida, U.S.	
18	Win	12–4–2	(Poland) Tomasz Nowak	SD	6	2003-12-05	(United States) The Blue Horizon, Philadelphia, Pennsylvania, U.S.	
17	Loss	11–4–2	(Belarus) Sergey Karanevich	TKO	4 (10)	2003-10-08	Luzhniki Olympic Complex, Moscow, Russia	For WBC Youth Light heavyweight title
16	Win	11–3–2	(United States) Bobby Heath	UD	6	2003-07-19	(United States) Upper Merion H. S., King of Prussia, Pennsylvania, U.S.	
15	Win	10–3–2	(Puerto Rico) Jose Aponte	TKO	1 (6), 0:29	2003-06-27	(United States) The Blue Horizon, Philadelphia, Pennsylvania, U.S.	
14	Loss	9–3–2	(Canada) Ian Gardner	UD	8	2003-06-20	(United States) First Union Spectrum, Philadelphia, Pennsylvania, U.S.	
13	Loss	9–2–2	(United States) Dennis Sharpe	UD	4	2003-05-17	(United States) Trump Taj Mahal, Atlantic City, New Jersey, U.S.	
12	Win	9–1–2	(United States) Joe Christy	UD	6	2003-01-24	(United States) Spectrum, Philadelphia, Pennsylvania, U.S.	
11	Loss	8–1–2	(United States) Clarence Taylor	MD	4	2002-10-04	(United States) Dover Downs, Dover, Delaware, U.S.	
10	Draw	8–0–2	(United States) Clarence Taylor	PTS	4	2002-06-26	(United States) Lagoon Nightclub, Essington, Pennsylvania, U.S.	
9	Draw	8–0–1	(United States) Ronald Boddie	PTS	6	2002-05-10	(United States) Dover Downs, Dover, Delaware, U.S.	
8	Win	8–0	(United States) Mike Rios	TKO	1 (?)	2001-11-14	(United States) Lagoon Nightclub, Essington, Pennsylvania, U.S.	
7	Win	7–0	(United States) Harold Tucker	UD	4	2001-10-10	(United States) Lagoon Nightclub, Essington, Pennsylvania, U.S.	
6	Win	6–0	(Panama) David Harper	TKO	3 (?)	2001-09-18	(United States) USA	
5	Win	5–0	(United States) Kenneth Carey	UD	4	2001-08-14	(United States) Lagoon Nightclub, Essington, Pennsylvania, U.S.	
4	Win	4–0	(United States) Charles Mack	PTS	4	2001-06-27	(United States) Lagoon Nightclub, Essington, Pennsylvania, U.S.	
3	Win	3–0	(United States) Raul Cosme	MD	4	2001-04-25	(United States) Lagoon Nightclub, Essington, Pennsylvania, U.S.	
2	Win	2–0	(United States) Donnie Penelton	UD	4	2001-04-10	(United States) 8 Second Saloon, Indianapolis, Indiana, U.S.	
1	Win	1–0	(United States) James Roberts	PTS	4	2001-03-07	(United States) Philadelphia, Pennsylvania, U.S.	
