= Max Alexander (boxer) =

American boxer

Max Alexander (born May 11, 1981, in Camden, New Jersey) is a former American boxer.

== Professional career ==
Alexander began his professional career in 2004 as a cruiser weight. Whilst he was undefeated, he would have lost a bout to Marty Lindquist in 2006 via a 1st round KO, however the bout was later declared a no contest because Lindquist failed a drug test. Although they would re-match and Alexander won by decision. His current professional record is 15 wins, 6 losses and 1 no contest.

== The Contender ==
Max Alexander was one of the featured boxers on the 3rd season of the boxing reality TV series The Contender, which premiered September 4, 2007, on ESPN. He was defeated by Sam Soliman in that season's second episode.

== Roy Jones Jr. ==
On December 10, 2011, after a 2-year pause from boxing, Alexander fought the biggest fight of his career when he faced the boxing legend: Roy Jones Jr. for a vacant cruiserweight championship in what many assumed would be the boxing legends' last fight. Alexander lost by unanimous decision.

== Professional boxing record ==
1 WIN (1 knockouts, 13 decisions), 22 losses (6 decisions), 2 draws
Result	Record	Opponent	Type	Round	Date	Location	Notes
Win	13–34–1	(United States) Franklin Edmondson	UD	5	2012-03-02	(United States) Guilford Convention Center, Greensboro, North Carolina	
Loss	54–8	(United States) Roy Jones Jr.	UD	10	2011-12-10	(United States) Atlanta Civic Center, Atlanta, Georgia	Universal Boxing Organisation Intercontinental Cruiserweight Title.
Loss	19–8–1	(Ghana) Moyoyo Mensah	UD	6	2009-10-03	Mystery Creek Events Centre, Hamilton, New Zealand	
Loss	16–1	(Russia) Aleksandr Alekseyev	UD	10	2009-05-02	(Germany) Halle 7, Bremen	
Loss	13–1–1	(Azerbaijan) Ali Ismailov	UD	10	2008-10-04	(Russia) PetersburgRegionGaz, Vyborg	
Draw	69–8–1	(United States) Rob Calloway	PTS	12	2008-07-19	(United States) St. Joseph Civic Arena, Saint Joseph, Missouri	WBC Continental Americas Cruiserweight Title.
Loss	14–1	(United States) Brian Vera	UD	6	2007-11-06	(United States) TD Banknorth Garden, Boston, Massachusetts	
Loss	33–9	(Australia) Sam Soliman	UD	5	2007-09-18	(United States) Contender Arena, Los Angeles, California	
Win	21–14–1	(United States) Demetrius Jenkins	UD	6	2007-04-06	(United States) The Blue Horizon, Philadelphia, Pennsylvania	
Win	13–4	(United States) Marty Lindquist	UD	8	2007-02-09	(United States) The Blue Horizon, Philadelphia, Pennsylvania	
No Contest	12–4	(United States) Marty Lindquist	NC	1	2006-10-14	(United States) Philadelphia Armory, Philadelphia, Pennsylvania	Alexander knocked out at 0:10 of the first round. Decision was vacated due to Lindquist's drug test failure.
Win	11–8–3	(United States) Tyrone Glover	UD	8	2006-09-11	(United States) Pennsylvania Convention Center, Philadelphia, Pennsylvania	
Win	3–9	(United States) William Gill	UD	6	2006-08-04	(United States) Philadelphia Armory, Philadelphia, Pennsylvania	
Win	11–9–1	(Germany) Juergen Hartenstein	TKO	2	2006-06-02	(United States) The Blue Horizon, Philadelphia, Pennsylvania	Referee stopped the bout at 2:31 of the second round.
Win	24–12–1	(United States) Tiwon Taylor	TKO	3	2006-04-07	(United States) The Blue Horizon, Philadelphia, Pennsylvania	Referee stopped the bout at 2:04 of the third round.
Win	2–9–3	(Uganda) Moses Matovu	UD	6	2006-02-10	(United States) The Blue Horizon, Philadelphia, Pennsylvania	
Win	8–3	(United States) Randy Pogue	UD	6	2006-01-13	(United States) Philadelphia Armory, Philadelphia, Pennsylvania	
Win	2–2	(United States) Jameson Bostic	UD	6	2005-12-02	(United States) The Blue Horizon, Philadelphia, Pennsylvania	
Win	6–14	(United States) Jacob Rodriguez	UD	6	2005-10-21	(United States) Philadelphia Armory, Philadelphia, Pennsylvania	
Win	2–4	(United States) William Gill	UD	6	2005-09-23	(United States) Asylum Arena, Philadelphia, Pennsylvania	
Draw	4–2	(United States) Alfred Kinsey	PTS	4	2005-08-04	(United States) The Borgata, Atlantic City, New Jersey	
Win	13–8–2	(United States) Dhafir Smith	UD	4	2005-06-24	(United States) The Blue Horizon, Philadelphia, Pennsylvania	
Win	0–1	(United States) Cameron Bright	UD	4	2004-09-11	(United States) Adam's Mark, Philadelphia, Pennsylvania	
Win	5–8	(United States) Jacob Rodriguez	UD	4	2004-08-03	(United States) Michael's Eighth Avenue, Glen Burnie, Maryland	
