= Danny Santiago =

American boxer

Personal information
- Nickname: The Bronx Bomber
- Born: February 21, 1973 (age 53) Bronx, New York, United States
- Height: 5 ft 8.5 in (1.74 m)
- Weight: Light heavyweight; Cruiserweight

Boxing career
- Reach: 65.5 in (166 cm)
- Stance: Orthodox

Boxing record
- Total fights: 42
- Wins: 34
- Win by KO: 20
- Losses: 7
- Draws: 1

Danny Santiago (born February 21, 1973) is an American former professional boxer who competed from 1997 to 2016. He challenged three times for a light heavyweight world title: the WBO title in January 2007, the IBO title in December 2007, and the WBA/IBA titles in 2011.

== Amateur career ==
Santiago had a strong amateur career, including the following highlights:

- 1995 New York City daily news Golden gloves champion
- 1995 empire state champion
- 1995 metro champion
- 1994 Florida golden glove champion
- 1994 Sunshine state champion
- 1995 Northeastern Regional Champion (178 Lbs.)
- 1996 Southeastern Regional Champion (178 Lbs.)
- 1996 Representative of Florida Bronze Medalists at 178Lbs, National Golden Gloves Tournament of Champions in Denver, Colorado
- 1996 International competition U.S.A. vs. Sweden representative of U.S.A. Silver Medalists at 178Lbs

== Professional career ==
In 1997, Danny made his professional debut with a first-round knockout of Michael Watkins. Between 1997 and 2002, Danny built a record of 22-0 and earned a shot at the WBA Fedelatin Light Heavyweight Title, where he suffered his first loss against Rocky Torres. By 2004, Danny defeated the highly ranked Elvir Muriqi in Madison Square Gardens with a devastating first-round knockout.

As a light heavy-weight, Santiago competed in world title bouts against several notable champions, including WBO and WBC champion Zsolt Erdei, unified champion Antonio Tarver, WBA and IBA champion Beibut Shumenov, and WBA and IBO champion Danny Green.

In 2010, Santiago was scheduled to fight Roy Jones, Jr, but the fight was cancelled due to an injury to Jones.

Santiago was a contestant on ESPN's very popular television series The Contender in 2007. Santiago owned and operated a successful boxing gym which served as a popular training ground world champions, including Tavoris Cloud, Ricardo Mayorga, and Jermain Taylor.

After his retirement from the ring, Santiago has become a successful trainer and promoter.

In 2021, Santiago was inducted into the Florida Boxing Hall of Fame.

== Professional boxing record ==
42 fights	34 wins	7 losses
By knockout	20	7
By decision	14	0
Draws	1	

No.	Result	Record	Opponent	Type	Round, time	Date	Location	Notes
42	Win	34–7–1	Galen Brown	TKO	3 (6), 2:42	Feb 13, 2016	SE Livestock Pavilion, Ocala, Florida, U.S.	
41	Loss	33–7–1	Victor Emilio Ramírez	TKO	4 (10), 1:40	Jan 31, 2014	Piso de los Deportes, Buenos Aires, Argentina	For IBF Latino cruiserweight title
40	Win	33–6–1	Rubin Williams	UD	8	Nov 22, 2013	SE Livestock Pavilion, Ocala, Florida, U.S.	
39	Win	32–6–1	Miguel Hernandez	UD	8	Aug 31, 2013	The Mela Room, Orlando, Florida, U.S.	
38	Loss	31–6–1	Danny Green	TKO	5 (10), 2:47	Jul 25, 2012	Challenge Stadium, Perth, Australia	
37	Loss	31–5–1	Beibut Shumenov	TKO	9 (12), 0:46	Jul 29, 2011	South Point Hotel, Casino & Spa, Enterprise, Nevada, U.S.	For WBA and IBA light heavyweight titles
36	Win	31–4–1	Billy Bailey	MD	8	May 21, 2010	DoubleTree Westshore Hotel, Tampa, Florida, U.S.	
35	Win	30–4–1	Paul Jennette	UD	8	May 16, 2009	SE Livestock Pavilion, Ocala, Florida, U.S.	
34	Loss	29–4–1	Antonio Tarver	TKO	4 (12), 2:53	Dec 1, 2007	Foxwoods Resort Casino, Ledyard, Connecticut, U.S.	For IBO light heavyweight title
33	Loss	29–3–1	Zsolt Erdei	TKO	8 (12), 1:55	Jan 27, 2007	Burg-Wächter Castello, Düsseldorf, Germany	For WBO light heavyweight title
32	Win	29–2–1	Marlon Hayes	UD	8	Dec 14, 2006	Gulfstream Park, Hallandale, Florida, U.S.	
31	Win	28–2–1	Mike Bonislawski	TKO	1 (8), 2:20	Jun 29, 2006	American Airlines Arena, Miami, Florida, U.S.	
30	Draw	27–2–1	Rayco Saunders	PTS	6	Feb 10, 2006	Bank United Center, Coral Gables, Florida, U.S.	
29	Win	27–2	Rico Cason	TKO	8 (12)	Aug 12, 2005	SE Livestock Pavilion, Ocala, Florida, U.S.	Won WBC Mundo Hispano light heavyweight title
28	Win	26–2	Ronald Boddie	UD	8	Dec 16, 2004	Days Inn, Allentown, Pennsylvania, U.S.	
27	Win	25–2	James Brock	KO	1 (8), 1:28	Dec 4, 2004	Barton Coliseum, Little Rock, Arkansas, U.S.	
26	Win	24–2	Elvir Muriqi	TKO	4 (10), 2:12	Oct 2, 2004	Madison Square Garden, New York City, New York, U.S.	
25	Win	23–2	Robert Muhammad	TKO	5 (8)	Mar 14, 2003	Arena Boxing Gym, Saint Petersburg, Florida, U.S.	
24	Loss	22–2	Orlando Rivera	TKO	9 (10), 1:36	Aug 29, 2002	Arena Boxing Gym, Saint Petersburg, Florida, U.S.	
23	Loss	22–1	Rocky Torres	TKO	11 (12), 1:49	May 11, 2002	Roberto Clemente Coliseum, San Juan, Puerto Rico	For vacant WBA Fedelatin light heavyweight title
22	Win	22–0	Tyrus Armstead	UD	10	Mar 30, 2002	Sovereign Center, Reading, Pennsylvania, U.S.	
21	Win	21–0	Antonio Garcia	TKO	1 (8), 1:35	Jun 8, 2001	Jai Alai Fronton, Miami, Florida, U.S.	
20	Win	20–0	Gerald Coleman	TKO	7 (8)	Dec 15, 2000	War Memorial Auditorium, Fort Lauderdale, Florida, U.S.	
19	Win	19–0	Roosevelt Booth	TKO	2 (8), 1:50	Aug 18, 2000	SE Livestock Pavilion, Ocala, Florida, U.S.	
18	Win	18–0	David McCluskey	TKO	2 (4), 1:43	Jun 24, 2000	Covington, Tennessee, U.S.	
17	Win	17–0	Anthony Spain	TKO	10 (12), 2:20	May 20, 2000	SE Livestock Pavilion, Ocala, Florida, U.S.	Won WBA–NBA Continental Americas light heavyweight title
16	Win	16–0	Andre Sherrod	TKO	5 (6), 0:40	Apr 15, 2000	Pamlico High School, Bayboro, North Carolina, U.S.	
15	Win	15–0	Tyrone Wallace	TKO	3	Oct 28, 1999	Atlanta, Georgia, U.S.	
14	Win	14–0	James Stokes	KO	3 (8), 2:09	Oct 9, 1999	SE Livestock Pavilion, Ocala, Florida, U.S.	
13	Win	13–0	Shannon Miller	UD	6	Jun 18, 1999	SE Livestock Pavilion, Ocala, Florida, U.S.	
12	Win	12–0	Johnny Walker	TKO	1	May 15, 1999	Augusta, Georgia, U.S.	
11	Win	11–0	Gregg Floyd	KO	2 (6), 1:18	Apr 17, 1999	Civic Center, Kissimmee, Florida, U.S.	
10	Win	10–0	Mack Willis	PTS	6	Mar 19, 1999	SE Livestock Pavilion, Ocala, Florida, U.S.	
9	Win	9–0	Larry McFadden	KO	1	Feb 27, 1999	Fort Gordon, Augusta, Georgia, U.S.	
8	Win	8–0	Eric Rhinehart	TKO	2	Jan 14, 1999	Virginia, U.S.	
7	Win	7–0	Anthony DeBardaladin	UD	4	Nov 20, 1998	SE Livestock Pavilion, Ocala, Florida, U.S.	
6	Win	6–0	Ralph Monday	UD	4	Aug 22, 1998	Orange County Fairgrounds, Orlando, Florida, U.S.	
5	Win	5–0	Forrest McFarland	UD	4	Nov 7, 1998	Cedar Beach Park, Allentown, Pennsylvania, U.S.	
4	Win	4–0	Calvin Smith	TKO	2 (4), 0:44	May 6, 1998	Civic Center, Kissimmee, Florida, U.S.	
3	Win	3–0	Cleveland Issacs	UD	4	Feb 13, 1998	The Blue Horizon, Philadelphia, Pennsylvania, U.S.	
2	Win	2–0	James Mullins	UD	4	Nov 25, 1997	Nashville, Tennessee, U.S.	
1	Win	1–0	Michael Watkins	TKO	1 (5), 0:47	Jun 9, 1997	Marriott Hotel, Orlando, Florida, U.S.	

== Trainer ==
Danny has been training fighters beginning with his Ocala gym that opened in 1991 and as a trainer since 2010. In 2017 He then moved to Tulua, Colombia where he opened boxeo y Mas Gym. He has trained multiple highly ranked fighters. He is the trainer for former WBC fecabox champion and current WBA N.A.B.A title holder Alexander Castro. Danny now has 2 gyms in Colombia. The original Boxeo Y Mas in Tulua, and his 2nd Boxeo Y Mas gym in Santa Marta, Colombia where he has an exclusive private training camp with all the amenities that athletes need to focus on becoming world champions. He currently is training some of Colombia's top boxing talent.
