= Henry Buchanan =

American boxer (born 1978)

Personal information
- Nickname: Sugar Poo
- Born: Henry Kanonta Buchanan; August 5, 1978 (age 48) Greenbelt, Maryland, US
- Height: 1.68 m (5 ft 6 in)
- Weight: Light heavyweight

Boxing career
- Stance: Orthodox

Boxing record
- Total fights: 25
- Wins: 21
- Win by KO: 14
- Losses: 4
- Draws: 0
- No contests: 0

Henry Kanonta Buchanan (born August 5, 1978) is an American professional boxer.

== Professional career ==
Known as "Sugar Poo", Buchanan began his professional career in 2004, and was undefeated heading into a ShoBox Super Middleweight eliminator tournament, and lost to Jean Paul Mendy.

== The Contender ==
He was the featured boxers on the 3rd season of the boxing reality TV series, The Contender, The Contender (season 3), premiering September 4, 2007 on ESPN.

Episode that aired on September 11, 2007, said that for personal reasons, he would not participate in season 3 of The Contender. Buchanan later revealed that it was a business and financial decision, as his promoter did not want to surrender Buchanan's promotional rights to ESPN.

== Personal life ==
He is the nephew of San Diego Chargers linebacker Shawne Merriman.

== Professional boxing record ==
25 fights	21 wins	4 losses
By knockout	14	1
By decision	7	3

No.	Result	Record	Opponent	Type	Round, time	Date	Location	Notes
25	Loss	21–4	(United States) Alexander Johnson	TKO	1 (8), 2:10	2014-09-20	(United States) Convention Center, Washington, D.C., USA	
24	Win	21–3	(United States) William Gill	TKO	3 (6), 2:29	2013-12-14	(United States) Walter E. Washington Convention Center, Washington, D.C., USA	
23	Loss	20–3	(United States) Shawn Hawk	UD	10	2012-03-31	(United States) 4 Bears Casino & Lodge, New Town, North Dakota, USA	
22	Win	20–2	(United States) Bobby Jordan	TKO	9 (10), 0:22	2010-08-14	(United States) Scope Arena, Norfolk, Virginia, USA	
21	Win	19–2	(United States) Julius Fogle	UD	8	2010-04-02	(United States) Walter E. Washington Convention Center, Washington, D.C., USA	
20	Win	18–2	(United States) Bobby Jordan	UD	8	2009-10-24	(United States) Convention Center, Washington, D.C., USA	
19	Loss	17–2	(United States) Andre Ward	UD	12	2009-02-06	(United States) Tachi Palace Hotel & Casino, Lemoore, California, USA	For vacant NABF and WBO-NABO super middleweight title
18	Win	17–1	(United States) Brian Norman	TKO	9 (10), 1:02	2008-06-25	(United States) Playboy Mansion, Beverly Hills, California, USA	
17	Win	16–1	(United States) Ross Thompson	UD	8	Mar 1, 2008	(United States) Home Depot Center, Carson, California, USA	
16	Win	15–1	(United States) Ted Muller	UD	8	2007-10-20	(United States) Sycuan Resort & Casino, El Cajon, California, USA	
15	Loss	14–1	(France) Jean-Paul Mendy	UD	10	2006-10-06	(United States) Chumash Casino Resort, Santa Ynez, California, USA	Buchanan was deducted 1 point in round 8 for low blows.
14	Win	14–0	(Costa Rica) Lucas Green Arias	UD	10	2006-07-28	(United States) PFTC Sports Center, Las Vegas, Nevada, USA	
13	Win	13–0	(Jamaica) Lloyd Bryan	TKO	1 (10), 2:52	2006-03-03	(United States) Lincoln Theatre, Washington, D.C., USA	
12	Win	12–0	(United States) Dhafir Smith	UD	8	2005-11-26	(United States) The Show Place Arena, Upper Marlboro, Maryland, USA	
11	Win	11–0	(United States) Tyrone Glover	UD	8	2005-07-21	(United States) Martins West, Woodlawn, Maryland, USA	
10	Win	10–0	(United States) Shannon Miller	TKO	4 (8), 2:43	2005-05-17	(United States) Lagoon Nightclub, Essington, Pennsylvania, USA	
9	Win	9–0	(Haiti) Julio Jean	TKO	6 (8), 1:55	2005-03-10	(United States) Michael's Eighth Avenue, Glen Burnie, Maryland, USA	
8	Win	8–0	(United States) Kirk Douglas	TKO	2 (6)	2005-02-05	(United States) Convention Center, Washington, D.C., USA	
7	Win	7–0	(United States) Henry Dukes	TKO	2 (6), 2:07	2004-12-12	(United States) Convention Center, Washington, D.C., USA	
6	Win	6–0	(United States) William Harmon	TKO	1 (6), 2:44	Nov 20, 2004	(United States) Mandalay Bay Resort & Casino, Las Vegas, Nevada, USA	
5	Win	5–0	(United States) Brian Norman	TKO	3 (4), 0:40	2004-09-30	(United States) Michael's Eighth Avenue, Glen Burnie, Maryland, USA	
4	Win	4–0	(United States) Keith Lawrence	TKO	1 (4), 2:15	2004-07-17	(United States) Baysox Stadium, Bowie, Maryland, USA	
3	Win	3–0	(United States) Henry Dukes	TKO	1 (4)	2004-06-26	(United States) Teamster's Local 639, Washington, D.C., USA	
2	Win	2–0	(United States) Gonzales Jones	TKO	2 (4), 2:27	2004-05-01	(United States) Convention Center, Washington, D.C., USA	
1	Win	1–0	(United States) Johnathan Logan	KO	3 (4)	2004-03-27	(United States) Lincoln Theatre, Washington, D.C., USA	
