= Allan Green =

American boxer

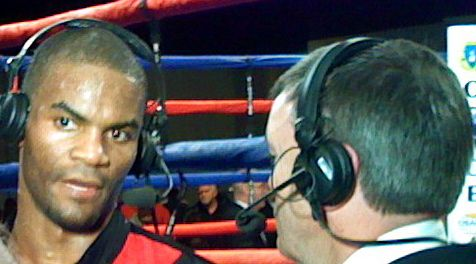
- Green (left) and Teddy Atlas, 2008

Personal information
- Nicknames: Sweetness; Ghost Dog; Thor
- Born: Allan Lamar Green; September 20, 1979 Tulsa, Oklahoma, U.S.
- Height: 6 ft 2 in (188 cm)
- Weight: Super middleweight Light heavyweight

Boxing career
- Reach: 73 in (185 cm)
- Stance: Orthodox

Boxing record
- Total fights: 39
- Wins: 33
- Win by KO: 22
- Losses: 6

Allan Lamar Green (born September 20, 1979) is an American professional boxer. He is a former NABO super middleweight champion and has challenged for world titles at both super middleweight and light heavyweight.

== Amateur career ==
Green had a stellar amateur career despite not making the Olympic Games, winning the 2002 National Golden Gloves, at 178 lbs, and compiling a 55–6 record. During the 2002 Golden Gloves tournament Allan beat Mike Tyson's two-decade-old, 8-second knockout record. He also was five-time Oklahoma state champion, and four-time regional champion, before coming pro at age 23.

=== Amateur accomplishments ===
- 5-time Oklahoma State Champion
- National Pal Silver Medalist
- 4-time regional Golden Glove Championships
- 2002 National Golden Gloves Light Heavyweight Champion

== Professional career ==
=== Early years at Light Heavyweight ===
Green made his professional debut on November 9, 2002, with a one-round TKO victory against Robert Dykes, in his fourth fight he outpointed Ola Afolabi. Green's career was on the upswing, and he made his ShoBox (a notable prospect show) debut with a 7-round TKO victory against Rocky Smith. It was perhaps Green's second appearance on ShoBox that gained notoriety for his blistering eighteen second KO victory against Jaidon Codrington. Green stunned Codrington and pinned him to the ropes, then threw brutal combinations before finishing with a left hook to the chin. The punch knocked Codrington unconscious and he fell through the ropes. The one round victory earned Green the 2005 Ring Magazine knockout of the year.

Green's first challenge was against Donnie McCrary. After knocking down McCrary early in the 3rd round, Green was knocked down for the first time in his career, but rallied back and won with a sixth-round KO. Green's next fight was against Contender member Anthony Bonsante, where Green cruised and won with a sixth-round knockout.

On October 14, 2006, Green brutally TKO'd former Olympian Jerson Ravelo on ESPN.

=== Middleweight ===
On March 3, 2007, Green moved down to 162 pounds to face middleweight contender Edison Miranda. Miranda would win by unanimous decision in San Juan, Puerto Rico. The bout was televised on HBO, and was noted for Green's surprisingly unspectacular performance.

Miranda dominated most of the fight and knocked Green down twice in the last round. Green mentioned afterward that moving down to middleweight was a major factor in his lack of aggression. He did, however, manage to floor Miranda in the eighth round, but failed to capitalize on the opportunity. Green stated his intentions to remain at super middleweight after this fight.

=== Super Middleweight ===
Green returned to the ring in July 2007, disposing of Darrell Woods in one round. Days after this win Green underwent major surgery to remove 85% of his colon. Green has stated that the illness caused him problems as early as the Miranda fight.

On October 19, 2007, at the Buffalo Run Casino in Miami, Oklahoma, Allan Green stopped Sherwin Davis in two rounds. Green, fighting for the first time since July (w ko 1 Darrell Woods), and following abdominal surgery, had Davis down twice in round one before closing the show.

Allan Green defeated Rubin Williams of Detroit on January 4, 2008. The fight was televised on ESPN2. Green recently was forced to turn down an HBO-televised meeting with Andre Ward, who represented the U.S. in the 2004 Olympics, capturing the gold medal in the light heavyweight division. Green wants a Ward fight and another HBO exposure, but he already had made the commitment to the Williams date.

Green was scheduled to face Antwun Echols on February 29, 2008, as part of Friday Night Fights on ESPN2. However, Green abruptly pulled out of the fight with 24 hours' notice. No explanation was given.

Green fought Carl Daniels on 11/15/08 in Nashville Tennessee and won by TKO in the 7th round.

Green then fought on April 25, 2009, at Foxwoods Resort, Mashantucket, Connecticut, on the under card of the Jermain Taylor vs. Carl Froch fight. Green fought Carlos de León Jr and defeated his foe by TKO in the second round. DeLeon was knocked down four times in the second round.

==== Super Six ====
In January 2010 Jermain Taylor announced his exit from Showtime's Super Six World Boxing Classic tournament. Green was selected as his replacement and challenged World Boxing Association super middleweight champion Andre Ward on June 19. Green lost his fight against Ward by unanimous decision.

After his fight with Ward, Green should have moved on to Stage 3 of The Super Six World Boxing Classic where he should have faced Denmark's "Viking Warrior", Mikkel Kessler for the WBC Super Middleweight Title. However, on 25 August 2010, Kessler had to resign from the tournament suffering from an eye injury.

Kessler was replaced by Glen Johnson to face Green November 6, 2010, in Las Vegas, Nevada, live on Showtime. Johnson won the fight by knockout in the eighth round, eliminating Green from the tournament.

== Professional boxing record ==
33 Wins (22 knockouts), 6 Losses, 0 Draws
Result	Record	Opponent	Type	Round	Date	Location	Notes
Loss	33–6	(Egypt) Ahmed Elbiali	KO	3 (10)	13/01/2019	(United States) Microsoft Theater, Los Angeles	
Win	33–5	(Puerto Rico) Edgar Perez	UD	6	18/01/2018	(United States) Criterion Event Center, Oklahoma City	
Loss	32–5	(Australia) Blake Caparello	UD	12 (12)	17/10/2013	The Melbourne Pavilion, Flemington, Victoria, Australia	
Win	32–4	(Canada) Renan St Juste	RTD	7 (10)	03/11/2012	Bell Centre, Montreal, Canada	
Loss	31–4	(Denmark) Mikkel Kessler	KO	4 (12)	19/05/2012	Parken, Copenhagen, Denmark	For vacant WBC Silver light heavyweight title.
Win	31–3	(Canada) Sebastien Demers	UD	12	15/11/2011	Pepsi Coliseum, Quebec City, Quebec, Canada	
Win	30–3	(United States) Craig Gandy	TKO	2 (8)	13/08/2011	(United States) Buffalo Run Casino, Miami, Oklahoma	
Loss	29–3	(Jamaica) Glen Johnson	TKO	8 (12)	06/11/2010	(United States) MGM Grand, Las Vegas	Green replaced Jermain Taylor, who withdrew after Group Stage 1 of Super Six tournament. Green was ahead on two judges' scorecards entering the 8th round.
Loss	29–2	(United States) Andre Ward	UD	12	19/06/2010	(United States) Oracle Arena, Oakland, California	For WBA Super World super middleweight title.
Win	29–1	(United States) Tarvis Simms	UD	10	02/10/2009	(United States) First Council Casino, Newkirk, Oklahoma	Won vacant WBO NABO super middleweight title.
Win	28–1	(Puerto Rico) Carlos de León Jr.	TKO	2 (10)	25/04/2009	(United States) Foxwoods Resort, Mashantucket, Connecticut	DeLeon down 4 times in round 2.
Win	27–1	(United States) Carl Daniels	TKO	7 (8)	15/11/2008	(United States) Vanderbilt University Memorial Gymnasium, Nashville, Tennessee	
Win	26–1	(United States) Rubin Williams	UD	10	04/01/2008	(United States) Million Dollar Elm Casino, Tulsa, Oklahoma	Green knocked Williams down in the 9th round with a jab.
Win	25–1	(United States) Sherwin Davis	KO	2 (8)	19/10/2007	(United States) Buffalo Run Casino, Miami, Oklahoma	
Win	24–1	(United States) Darrell Woods	KO	1 (10)	13/07/2007	(United States) Million Dollar Elm Casino, Tulsa, Oklahoma	Woods was knocked down prior to the KO.
Loss	23–1	(Colombia) Edison Miranda	UD	10	03/03/2007	Roberto Clemente Coliseum, San Juan, Puerto Rico	Miranda was knocked down in 8th round, Green was knocked down twice in the 10th.
Win	23–0	(United States) Jerson Ravelo	TKO	8 (8)	14/10/2006	(United States) Dunkin' Donuts Center, Providence, Rhode Island	
Win	22–0	(United States) Emmett Linton	UD	10	01/09/2006	(United States) Million Dollar Elm Casino, Tulsa, Oklahoma	Linton was knocked down in the 7th round.
Win	21–0	(United States) Anthony Bonsante	TKO	5 (10)	21/07/2006	(United States) Million Dollar Elm Casino, Tulsa, Oklahoma	Bonsante was knocked down once in the 2nd round by two counter left hooks and once in the 5th round also by a left hook.
Win	20–0	(United States) Donny McCrary	TKO	6 (10)	26/04/2006	(United States) Buffalo Run Casino, Miami, Oklahoma	
Win	19–0	(United States) Mike Jackson	TKO	1 (8)	27/01/2006	(United States) Buffalo Run Casino, Miami, Oklahoma	
Win	18–0	(United States) Jaidon Codrington	KO	1 (8)	04/11/2005	(United States) Buffalo Run Casino, Miami, Oklahoma	Ring magazine knockout of the year.
Win	17–0	(United States) Ted Muller	UD	10	26/08/2005	(United States) Thunderbird Wild West Casino, Norman, Oklahoma	
Win	16–0	(United States) Rocky Smith	TD	7 (10)	20/05/2005	(United States) Buffalo Run Casino, Miami, Oklahoma	
Win	15–0	(United States) Sebastian Hill	TKO	3 (6)	25/02/2005	(United States) Buffalo Run Casino, Miami, Oklahoma	Overmatched Hill was down once in each of the first 2 rounds before the referee stopped the one-sided fight in the 3rd round.
Win	14–0	(United States) Etianne Whitaker	KO	2 (10)	27/11/2004	(United States) Buffalo Run Casino, Miami, Oklahoma	
Win	13–0	(Canada) Conal MacPhee	KO	2 (6)	02/07/2004	(United States) Pala Casino, Pala, California	MacPhee down three times in the 2nd round.
Win	12–0	(Canada) Willard Lewis	UD	8	27/03/2004	(United States) Marconi Automotive Museum, Tustin, California	
Win	11–0	(United States) Laverne Clark	TKO	3 (6)	05/03/2004	(United States) Pala Casino, Pala, California	
Win	10–0	(United States) Joe Pastorello	TKO	2 (4)	06/02/2004	(United States) Desert Diamond Casino, Tucson, California	
Win	9–0	(United States) John Turlington	UD	4	31/01/2004	(United States) Expo Pavilion, Tulsa, Oklahoma	
Win	8–0	(United States) Marc LeFleche	TKO	5 (6)	07/11/2003	(United States) Desert Diamond Casino, Tucson, California	
Win	7–0	(United States) James Green	KO	5 (6)	05/09/2003	(United States) Stardust Hotel & Casino, Las Vegas	
Win	6–0	(United States) Tyrone Jackson	UD	6	25/07/2003	(United States) Creek Nation Gaming Center, Tulsa, Oklahoma	
Win	5–0	(United States) Berry Basler	KO	3 (4)	25/04/2003	(United States) Thunderbird Wild West Casino, Norman, Oklahoma	
Win	4–0	(United Kingdom) Ola Afolabi	UD	4	25/04/2003	(United States) Marconi Automotive Museum, Tustin, California	
Win	3–0	(United States) Rodney Moore	KO	1 (4)	07/02/2003	(United States) Sams Town Hotel, Las Vegas	
Win	2–0	(United States) Donnie Davis	KO	1 (4)	07/02/2003	(United States) Thunderbird Wild West Casino, Norman, Oklahoma	
Win	1–0	(United States) Robert Dykes	TKO	1 (4)	09/11/2002	(United States) Coca-Cola Center, Oklahoma City	

== Personal life ==
Green is a vegetarian, he also enjoys comic books and games on the PlayStation.
