= Ahmed Elbiali =

Egyptian-American professional boxer

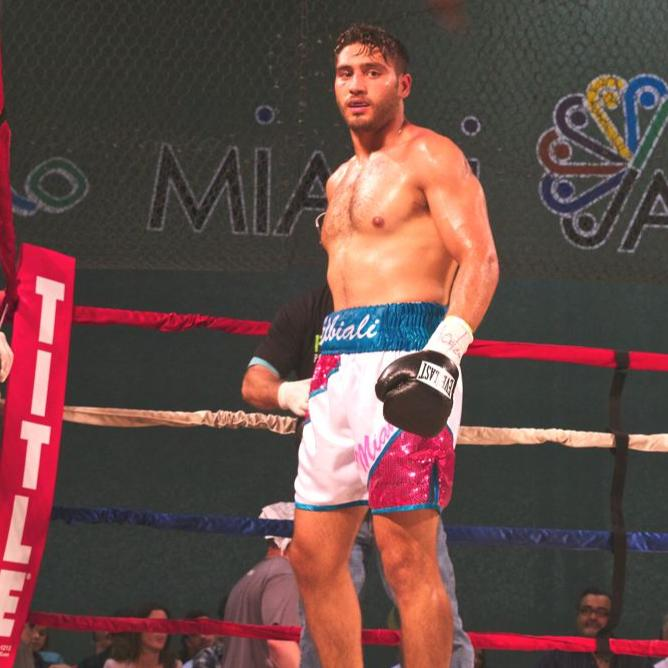
- Ahmed in 2013

Personal information
- Nickname: The Egyptian
- Nationality: Egyptian
- Born: October 1, 1990 (age 36) Cairo, Egypt
- Height: 183 cm (6 ft 0 in)
- Weight: Light heavyweight

Boxing career
- Reach: 185 cm (73 in)
- Stance: Orthodox

Boxing record
- Total fights: 26
- Wins: 24
- Win by KO: 19
- Losses: 2
- Draws: 0

Ahmed Elbiali (born October 1, 1990) is an Egyptian-American professional boxer. He is managed by Al Haymon.

Elbiali earned an amateur record of 36–7, winning two Florida State Golden Gloves Championships and represented the Miami Gallos in the World Series of Boxing. Elbiali wanted to box for Egypt at the 2012 London Olympics however his efforts were cut short due to the Arab Spring and he was unable to compete in qualifying and he then turned professional.

== Professional boxing record ==
| 26 fights | 24 wins | 2 losses |
|---|---|---|
| By knockout | 19 | 2 |
| By decision | 4 | 0 |
| By disqualification | 1 | 0 |

| No. | Result | Record | Opponent | Type | Round, time | Date | Location | Notes |
|---|---|---|---|---|---|---|---|---|
| 26 | Loss | 24–2 | (Austria) Umar Dzambekov | KO | 2 (10), 0:57 | 15 Feb 2026 | Meta Apex, Enterprise, Nevada, US | |
| 25 | Win | 24–1 | (Argentina) Guillermo Ruben Andino | TKO | 4 (10), 1:17 | Nov 15, 2024 | (United Arab Emirates) Agenda Arena, Dubai, UAE | |
| 24 | Win | 23–1 | (United States) Rodolfo Gomez Jr. | UD | 10 | Jun 9, 2023 | (United States) Casino Miami Jai-Alai, Miami, U.S. | Retained WBA-NABA light heavyweight title; Won vacant WBC-NABF light heavyweight title |
| 23 | Win | 22–1 | (Venezuela) Dervin Colina | DQ | 4 (10), 1:31 | Jun 11, 2022 | (United States) Casino Miami Jai-Alai, Miami, Florida, U.S. | Won vacant WBA-NABA light heavyweight title |
| 22 | Win | 21–1 | (Argentina) Bruno Leonardo Romay | TKO | 2 (8), 0:45 | Oct 16, 2021 | (United States) Gulfstream Park Racing & Casino, Hallandale, Florida, U.S. | |
| 21 | Win | 20–1 | (United States) Brian Vera | TKO | 6 (10), 1:15 | Dec 28, 2019 | (United States) State Farm Arena, Atlanta, U.S. | |
| 20 | Win | 19–1 | (Brazil) Marlos Eduardo Simoes | TKO | 2 (10), 1:12 | May 25, 2019 | (United States) Beau Rivage Resort & Casino, Biloxi, Mississippi, U.S. | |
| 19 | Win | 18–1 | (United States) Allan Green | KO | 3 (8), 1:16 | Jan 13, 2019 | (United States) Microsoft Theater, Los Angeles, California, U.S. | |
| 18 | Win | 17–1 | (Hungary) Zoltan Sera | KO | 3 (10), 1:06 | Jun 10, 2018 | (United States) Pioneer Event Center, Lancaster, California, U.S. | |
| 17 | Loss | 16–1 | (Canada) Jean Pascal | TKO | 6 (10), 2:06 | Dec 8, 2017 | (United States) Park Race Track, Hialeah, Florida, U.S. | |
| 16 | Win | 16–0 | (United States) Andrew Hernandez | UD | 8 | 12 Jan 2016 | (United States) Cowboys Dance Hall, San Antonio, Texas, U.S. | |
| 15 | Win | 15–0 | (Spain) Mariano Hilario | UD | 8 | 13 Oct 2015 | (United States) Little Creek Casino Resort, Shelton, Washington, U.S. | |
| 14 | Win | 14–0 | (Brazil) Fabiano Pena | KO | 1 (8), 1:15 | 08 Sep 2015 | (United States) Hollywood Palladium, Hollywood, California, U.S. | |
| 13 | Win | 13–0 | (United States) Donta Woods | KO | 1 (8), 1:04 | 13 Jun 2015 | (United States) Bartow Arena, Birmingham, Alabama, U.S. | |
| 12 | Win | 12–0 | (United Kingdom) Mike Stafford | UD | 6 | 26 Mar 2015 | (United States) Hialeah Park Race Track, Hialeah, Florida, U.S. | |
| 11 | Win | 11–0 | (United States) Dustin Craig Echard | TKO | 2 (6), 0:44 | 06 Feb 2015 | (United States) Beau Rivage Resort & Casino, Biloxi, Mississippi, U.S. | |
| 10 | Win | 10–0 | (United States) Lawrence Blakey | KO | 3 (4), 1:44 | 11 Dec 2014 | (United States) Pechanga Resort & Casino, Temecula, California, U.S. | |
