= Rubin Williams =

American boxer

Personal information
- Nickname: Mr Hollywood
- Born: April 9, 1976 (age 50) Detroit, Michigan
- Height: 6 ft 1 in (185 cm)
- Weight: Heavyweight

Boxing career
- Reach: 75 in (191 cm)
- Stance: Orthodox

Boxing record
- Total fights: 63
- Wins: 29
- Win by KO: 16
- Losses: 33
- Draws: 1

Rubin Williams (born April 9, 1976) is an American professional boxer. He challenged for the IBF super middleweight title in 2005.

== Professional career ==
Known as "Mr. Hollywood", Williams began his professional career in 2001, and in 2005 challenged the IBF super middleweight title holder Jeff Lacy, but lost via TKO. In 2007 he drew with contender Antwun Echols. After this fight he was sporting a record of 29-2-1.

Since then, Williams has been on a long losing skid, as of 2018, owning a 29-33-1 record as a professional boxer.

== The Contender ==
Williams was one of the featured boxers in Season 3 of the boxing reality TV series The Contender, which premiered September 4, 2007 on ESPN. He was eliminated in the first episode.

== Mixed martial arts ==
Williams was defeated, by submission (kimura), in his MMA debut against Kazushi Sakuraba on Dream 11 on October 6, 2009.

== Professional boxing record ==
63 fights	29 wins	33 losses
By knockout	16	23
By decision	13	10
Draws	1	

No.	Result	Record	Opponent	Type	Round, time	Date	Location	Notes
63	Loss	29–33–1	(United States) Daniel Martz	TKO	1 (10), 1:59	2018-11-21	(United States) Castleton Banquet & Conference Center, Windham, New Hampshire, USA	
62	Loss	29–32–1	(United States) Jason Bergman	TKO	1 (10), 2:53	2018-04-28	(United States) Castleton Banquet & Conference Center, Windham, New Hampshire, USA	
61	Loss	29–31–1	(United States) Jeremiah Karpency	TKO	1 (10), 1:36	2018-01-27	(United States) Castleton Banquet & Conference Center, Windham, New Hampshire, USA	
60	Loss	29–30–1	(United States) Tommy Karpency	TKO	1 (10), 1:00	2017-11-11	(United States) Cumberland County Civic Center, Portland, Maine, USA	
59	Loss	29–29–1	(United States) Patrick Ferguson	KO	1 (6), 1:41	2016-08-11	(United States) Fort Belknap Casino, Hays, Montana, USA	
58	Loss	29–28–1	(United States) Scott Conner	KO	4 (4), 0:25	2016-02-13	(United States) Royal Oak Music Theatre, Royal Oak, Michigan, USA	
57	Loss	29–27–1	(United States) Daniel Martz	KO	1 (8), 1:29	2015-07-24	(United States) Wheeling Island Casino Racetrack, Wheeling, West Virginia, USA	
56	Loss	29–26–1	(United States) Eugene Hill	KO	1 (6), 0:38	2015-03-13	(United States) Charles T. Doyle Convention Center, Texas City, Texas, USA	
55	Loss	29–25–1	(United States) Daniel Martz	TKO	2 (8), 1:15	2014-10-11	(United States) Falcon Center at Fairmont State University, Fairmont, West Virginia, USA	
54	Loss	29–24–1	(United States) Ed Latimore	KO	1 (4), 1:05	2014-03-28	(United States) Serbian American Cultural Center, Weirton, West Virginia, USA	
53	Loss	29–23–1	(United States) Jeremiah Karpency	UD	8	2014-01-31	(United States) Waterfront Place Hotel, Morgantown, West Virginia, USA	
52	Loss	29–22–1	(United States) Jason Bergman	KO	1 (8), 1:41	2013-12-13	(United States) Serbian American Cultural Center, Weirton, West Virginia, USA	
51	Loss	29–21–1	(United States) Danny Santiago	UD	6	2013-11-22	(United States) SE Livestock Pavilion, Ocala, Florida, USA	
50	Loss	29–20–1	(Canada) Ali Mansour	UD	6	2013-10-17	(United States) MotorCity Casino Hotel, Detroit, Michigan, USA	
49	Loss	29–19–1	(United States) China Smith	TKO	7 (10), 2:59	2013-07-26	(United States) Bradenton Area Convention Center, Bradenton, Florida, USA	
48	Loss	29–18–1	(United States) Daniel Martz	UD	8	2013-07-03	(United States) Serbian American Cultural Center, Weirton, West Virginia, USA	
47	Loss	29–17–1	(Cameroon) Fred Kassi	TKO	2 (6), 2:28	2012-12-01	(United States) Crescent City Boxing Gym, New Orleans, Louisiana, USA	
46	Loss	29–16–1	(United States) Eric Fields	TKO	2 (10)	2011-09-02	(United States) Riverwind Casino, Norman, Oklahoma, USA	
45	Loss	29–15–1	(United States) Steve Collins	RTD	3 (6), 0:10	2011-05-19	(United States) The Houston Club, Houston, Texas, USA	
44	Loss	29–14–1	(United States) Damian Wills	KO	1 (10), 2:48	2010-12-14	(United States) Civic Center, Marshall, Texas, USA	
43	Loss	29–13–1	(United States) Darryl Cunningham	UD	10	2010-11-12	(United States) Royal Oak Music Theatre, Royal Oak, Michigan, USA	
42	Loss	29–12–1	(United States) Felix Cora Jr.	RTD	5 (6), 0:10	2010-08-19	(United States) Charles T. Doyle Convention Center, Texas City, Texas, USA	
41	Loss	29–11–1	(United States) Shawn Hawk	UD	10	2010-07-17	(United States) 4 Bears Casino & Lodge, New Town, North Dakota, USA	
40	Loss	29–10–1	(United States) Alfonso López III	UD	10	2010-06-17	(United States) Humble Civic Center Arena, Humble, Texas, USA	
39	Loss	29–9–1	(Australia) Les Sherrington	TKO	4 (12), 2:57	2010-04-29	Gold Coast Convention and Exhibition Centre, Gold Coast, Queensland, Australia	For WBF & PABA Super middleweight titles; Williams failed to make weight.
38	Loss	29–8–1	(United States) Mark Tucker	UD	10	2009-07-17	(United States) Shipley Arena, Westminster, Maryland, USA	
37	Loss	29–7–1	(United States) Cedric Agnew	UD	8	2009-04-30	(United States) Anatole Hotel, Dallas, Texas, USA	
36	Loss	29–6–1	(Germany) Eduard Gutknecht	TKO	5 (8), 2:45	2009-02-07	Stadthalle, Rostock, Germany	
35	Loss	29–5–1	(United States) Chris Henry	TKO	6 (10), 2:15	2008-07-09	(United States) Grand Plaza Hotel, Houston, Texas, USA	
34	Loss	29–4–1	(United States) Andre Ward	TKO	7 (10), 2:51	2008-03-20	(United States) HP Pavilion, San Jose, California, USA	
33	Loss	29–3–1	(United States) Allan Green	UD	10	2008-01-04	(United States) Million Dollar Elm Casino, Tulsa, Oklahoma, USA	
32	Draw	29–2–1	(United States) Antwun Echols	SD	12	2007-01-12	(United States) The Palace, Auburn Hills, Michigan, USA	For vacant IBA Super middleweight title.
31	Win	29–2	(United States) Max Heyman	UD	12	2006-08-04	(United States) South Coast Hotel and Casino, Paradise, Las Vegas, Nevada, USA	Won vacant NBA Super middleweight title.
30	Win	28–2	(Jamaica) Richard Grant	UD	8	2006-05-05	(United States) Ybor City Multi Fight Complex, Tampa, Florida, USA	
29	Win	27–2	(United States) Anthony Stephens	TKO	3 (10), 1:33	2005-07-29	(United States) DeCarlo's Convention Center, Warren, Michigan, USA	
28	Loss	26–2	(United States) Jeff Lacy	TKO	7 (12), 0:47	2005-03-05	(United States) Mandalay Bay Events Center, Paradise, Las Vegas, Nevada, USA	For IBF Super middleweight title.
27	Win	26–1	(United States) Aaron Norwood	UD	10	2005-01-28	(United States) DeCarlo's Convention Center, Warren, Michigan, USA	Retained IBU Intercontinental Super middleweight title.
26	Win	25–1	(United States) Tim Bowe	UD	10	2004-10-08	(United States) DeCarlo's Banquet Center, Warren, Michigan, USA	Won vacant IBU Intercontinental Super middleweight title.
25	Win	24–1	(United States) Warren Moore	KO	1 (10), 2:37	2004-06-18	(United States) Great Lakes Sports Arena, Fraser, Michigan, USA	Won NABC Intercontinental Super middleweight title.
24	Win	23–1	(United States) Kenny Bowman	MD	10	2004-04-02	(United States) DeCarlo's Banquet Center, Warren, Michigan, USA	
23	Win	22–1	(United States) Anton Robinson	KO	2 (10), 1:42	2004-01-09	(United States) DeCarlo's Banquet Center, Warren, Michigan, USA	
22	Win	21–1	(United States) Tony Menefee	TKO	9 (10), 2:13	2003-10-17	(United States) DeCarlo's Banquet Center, Warren, Michigan, USA	
21	Win	20–1	(United States) Charles Daye	TKO	2 (4), 1:30	2003-08-23	(United States) Riehle Brothers Pavilion, Lafayette, Indiana, USA	
20	Loss	19–1	(Colombia) Epifanio Mendoza	KO	1 (10), 0:42	2003-06-13	(United States) Joe Louis Arena, Detroit, Michigan, USA	For vacant NABA Middleweight title.
19	Win	19–0	(United States) Tony Kern	KO	1 (6), 0:34	2003-05-17	(United States) Civic Center, Hammond, Indiana, USA	
18	Win	18–0	(United States) Floyd Williams	TKO	4 (8)	2003-03-14	(United States) DeCarlo's Banquet Center, Warren, Michigan, USA	
17	Win	17–0	(United States) Mike McFail	UD	10	2003-01-10	(United States) DeCarlo's Banquet Center, Warren, Michigan, USA	Won vacant USA Mid West Middleweight title.
16	Win	16–0	(United States) Ray Shanks	TKO	2 (6), 0:44	2002-12-14	(United States) Cambridge Place, Toledo, Ohio, USA	
15	Win	15–0	(United States) Jerry Smith	UD	6	2002-11-23	(United States) Community Market, Danville, Virginia, USA	
14	Win	14–0	(United States) Reggie Strickland	UD	6	2002-11-01	(United States) Roy Wilkins Auditorium, Saint Paul, Minnesota, USA	
13	Win	13–0	(United States) Osiris Ayise	UD	6	2002-10-24	(United States) The Plex, North Charleston, South Carolina, USA	
12	Win	12–0	(United States) Tim Dendy	UD	6	2002-10-12	(United States) The Trap, Nashville, Tennessee, USA	
11	Win	11–0	(United States) Karl Willis	UD	8	2002-09-20	(United States) DeCarlo's Banquet Center, Warren, Michigan, USA	
10	Win	10–0	(United States) Brady Frost	TKO	1 (4)	2002-06-28	(United States) Farm Bureau Building, Indianapolis, Indiana, USA	
9	Win	9–0	(United States) Ike Porter	TKO	1 (6), 1:28	2002-06-21	(United States) DeCarlo's Banquet Center, Warren, Michigan, USA	
8	Win	8–0	(United States) Andre Turner	KO	1 (4), 1:42	2002-06-01	(United States) Cumberland Place, West Lafayette, Indiana, USA	
7	Win	7–0	(United States) Eric Rhinehart	UD	6	2002-05-11	(United States) Gallatin, Tennessee, USA	
6	Win	6–0	(United States) Warren Jackson	TKO	3 (10), 1:55	2002-03-29	(United States) Club International, Detroit, Michigan, USA	Won vacant USA Mid West & Michigan States Light heavyweight titles.
5	Win	5–0	(United States) Travis Daily	TKO	4 (4)	2002-01-31	(United States) The Roostertail, Detroit, Michigan, USA	
4	Win	4–0	(United States) Norman Johnson	TKO	1 (4), 2:15	2001-12-07	(United States) Club International, Detroit, Michigan, USA	
3	Win	3–0	(United States) Douglas LaFontsee	KO	1 (4), 1:15	2001-11-09	(United States) Club International, Detroit, Michigan, USA	
2	Win	2–0	(United States) Robert Lee	TKO	1 (4), 1:21	2001-10-12	(United States) Club International, Detroit, Michigan, USA	
1	Win	1–0	(United States) Kolmarge Harris	UD	4	2001-08-10	(United States) Cobo Hall, Detroit, Michigan, USA	Professional debut.

== Mixed martial arts record ==
Professional record breakdown
1 match	0 wins	1 loss
By knockout	0	0
By submission	0	1
By decision	0	0

Res.	Record	Opponent	Method	Event	Date	Round	Time	Location	Notes
Loss	0–1	Kazushi Sakuraba	Submission (kimura)	DREAM.11: Feather Weight Grand Prix 2009 Final Round	October 6, 2009	1	2:53	Yokohama, Japan	
