= Jean-Paul Mendy =

French boxer

Personal information
- Full name: Jean-Paul Mendy
- Nationality: France
- Born: December 14, 1973 (age 52) Mantes-la-Jolie, Yvelines
- Height: 1.82 m (6 ft 0 in)
- Weight: 75 kg (165 lb)

Sport
- Sport: Boxing
- Weight class: Middleweight
- Club: BA les Mureaux 78
Medal record
World Amateur Championships
Bronze medal – third place	1997 Budapest	Middleweight
European Amateur Championships
Bronze medal – third place	1996 Vejle	Middleweight
Bronze medal – third place	1998 Minsk	Middleweight
Mediterranean Games
Gold medal – first place	1997 Bari	Middleweight
Francophone Games
Gold medal – first place	1997 Antananarivo	Middleweight
Goodwill Games
Silver medal – second place	1998 New York	Middleweight

Jean-Paul Mendy (born December 14, 1973, in Mantes-la-Jolie, Yvelines) is a professional boxer from France, who won the bronze medal in the middleweight division (– 75 kg) at the 1997 World Amateur Boxing Championships in Budapest, Hungary.

== Amateur ==
The southpaw represented his native country at the 1996 Summer Olympics in Atlanta, where he was defeated in the first round by Germany's Sven Ottke on points (4–11).

== Pro ==
Jean-Paul made his professional debut on December 22, 2000, when he beat countryman Guy Dia-Njoh on knock-out in the second round. He was undefeated as professional for 29 matches.

Mendy fought Sakio Bika on July 31 in Las Vegas, for an IBF #1 spot and a shot at the title. Bika lost the fight by disqualification in the 1st round after he knocked Mendy out with a punch following a knockdown and while Mendy was still on his knees.

=== Challenging Bute ===
On July 9, 2011, Mendy fought for the IBF Super Middleweight title against Lucian Bute in his native country, Romania, in an event which took place at Romexpo in the capital Bucharest. Jean-Paul Mendy lost the title match via knockout at 2:48 in the fourth round.

== Professional boxing record ==
29 Wins (16 knockouts, 12 decisions 1 disqualification), 1 Losses (1 knockout, 0 decision), 1 Draws
Res.	Record	Opponent	Type	Rd., Time	Date	Location	Notes
Loss	29-1-1	(Romania) Lucian Bute	KO	4 (12)	2011-07-09	Romexpo Dome, Bucharest, Romania	For the IBF Super Middleweight title.
Win	29-0-1	(Cameroon) Sakio Bika	DQ	1 (12)	2010-07-31	(United States) Mandalay Bay Resort & Casino, Las Vegas, Nevada	IBF Super Middleweight title eliminator.
Win	28-0-1	(Brazil) Josival Lima Teixeira	KO	9 (10)	2010-03-20	(France) La Palestre, Le Cannet, Alpes-Maritimes	
Win	27-0-1	(United Kingdom) Matthew Barr	TKO	4 (8)	2009-11-06	(France) Palais des Sports de Toulon, Toulon, Var	
Win	26-0-1	(United Kingdom) Nathan King	RTD	6 (10)	2009-09-10	Cirque d'hiver, Paris, Île-de-France	
Win	25-0-1	(Canada) Jason Naugler	UD	12 (12)	2008-10-25	(United States) Township Auditorium, Columbia, South Carolina	Won vacant IBF International Super Middleweight title.
Win	24-0-1	(United States) Christopher Holt	TKO	5 (8)	2007-11-29	(United States) The Plex, Charleston, South Carolina	
Draw	23-0-1	(United States) Anthony Hanshaw	SD	12 (12)	2007-01-05	(United States) DeSoto Civic Center, Southaven, Mississippi	For vacant IBO Super Middleweight title.
Win	23-0-0	(United States) Henry Buchanan	UD	10 (10)	2006-10-06	(United States) Chumash Casino, Santa Ynez, California	
Win	22-0-0	(United States) Dallas Vargas	TKO	1 (10)	2006-07-28	(United States) PFTC Sports Center, Las Vegas, Nevada	
Win	21-0-0	(France) Laurent Goury	PTS	8 (8)	2006-06-09	(France) Lucé, Eure-et-Loir	
Win	20-0-0	(United States) Travis Clybourn	TKO	2 (5)	2006-04-29	(United States) Greensboro Coliseum, Greensboro, North Carolina	
Win	19-0-0	(United States) Carlton Holland	TKO	2 (8)	2005-07-01	(United States) The Plex, Charleston, South Carolina	
Win	18-0-0	(France) Akim Gros	TKO	4 (10)	2005-05-28	(France) Lucé, Eure-et-Loir	
Win	17-0-0	(Romania) Octavian Stoica	TKO	5 (8)	2004-11-20	(France) Lucé, Eure-et-Loir	
Win	16-0-0	(France) Frédéric Esther	UD	10 (10)	2004-04-08	(France) Poitiers, Vienne	Retained France Super Middleweight title.
Win	15-0-0	(South Africa) Simon Mokoena	PTS	8 (8)	2004-02-20	(France) Saint-Dizier, Haute-Marne	
Win	14-0-0	(France) Rachid Kanfouah	PTS	10 (10)	2003-11-14	(France) Clermont-Ferrand, Puy-de-Dôme	Retained France Super Middleweight title.
Win	13-0-0	(Belarus) Sergey Karanevich	UD	8 (8)	2003-05-19	(France) Palais des Sports, Levallois-Perret, Hauts-de-Seine	
Win	12-0-0	(Portugal) Eliseo Nogueira	PTS	8 (8)	2003-04-04	(France) Maison des Sports, Clermont-Ferrand, Puy-de-Dôme	
Win	11-0-0	(Portugal) Eliseo Nogueira	PTS	10 (10)	2002-12-05	(France) Palais des Sports, Levallois-Perret, Hauts-de-Seine	
Win	10-0-0	(France) Youssef Temsoury	UD	10 (10)	2002-05-02	(France) Pont-Audemer, Eure	Retained France Super Middleweight title.
Win	9-0-0	(France) Rachid Kanfouah	MD	10 (10)	2002-02-26	(France) Clermont-Ferrand, Puy-de-Dôme	Won vacant France Super Middleweight title.
Win	8-0-0	(Ghana) Daniel Sackey	TKO	5 (8)	2001-12-14	(France) Béziers, Hérault	
Win	7-0-0	(Cameroon) Richard Pokossi	PTS	8 (8)	2001-11-24	(France) Palais des Sports, Bondy, Seine-Saint-Denis	
Win	6-0-0	(Croatia) Ernest Barbarosa	TKO	3 (6)	2001-08-04	(France) Plages du Prado, Marseille, Bouches-du-Rhône	
Win	5-0-0	(Algeria) Mourad Djabrouhou	TKO	3 (6)	2001-05-28	(France) Levallois-Perret, Hauts-de-Seine	
Win	4-0-0	(Montenegro) Milojko Pivljanin	TKO	4 (6)	2001-03-31	(France) Saint-Bonnet, Charente-Maritime	
Win	3-0-0	(United States) Rachid Bakour	TKO	2 (6)	2001-03-12	(France) Palais des Sports, Paris	
Win	2-0-0	(Algeria) Said Boukefous	TKO	1 (6)	2001-02-16	(France) Mont-de-Marsan, Landes	
Win	1-0-0	(France) Guy Dia Njoh	TKO	2 (6)	2000-12-22	(France) Bondy, Seine-Saint-Denis	Pro debut.
