= Shawn Hawk =

American boxer

Personal information
- Nickname: The Sioux Warrior
- Nationality: American
- Born: 17 May 1984 (age 42) Sioux Falls, South Dakota, U.S.
- Weight: Light heavyweight Cruiserweight

Boxing career
- Stance: orthodox

Boxing record
- Total fights: 27
- Wins: 23
- Win by KO: 17
- Losses: 3
- Draws: 1
- No contests: 0

Shawn Hawk (born 17 May 1984) is a professional boxer from Crow Creek Sioux Tribe who fights in the light heavyweight division having previously boxed at Cruiserweight.

== Professional career ==
Hawk turned professional in May 2004 at the 4 Bears Casino, North Dakota, United States. In his debut Hawk defeated Miguel Munoz by way of a first-round knockout. On July 10, 2009, Shawn Hawk lost to Matt Godfrey by unanimous decision.

== Professional boxing record ==
23 Wins (17 knockouts, 6 decisions), 3 Losses (1 knockout, 2 decisions), 1 Draw
Result	Record	Opponent	Type	Round	Date	Location	Notes
Loss	24-0	(Wales) Nathan Cleverly	TKO	8	10/11/2012	(United States) Staples Center, Los Angeles, California	WBO Light Heavyweight Title. Referee stopped the bout at 1:53 of the eighth round.
Loss	8-0	(Colombia) Eleider Alvarez	UD	12	08/06/2012	(Canada) Bell Centre, Montreal, Quebec	WBO NABO Light Heavyweight Title.
Win	20-2	(United States) Henry Buchanan	UD	10	31/03/2012	(United States) 4 Bears Casino & Lodge, New Town, North Dakota	
Win	23-8-2	(United States) Otis Griffin	SD	10	20/10/2011	(United States) Coeur d'Alene Casino, Worley, Idaho	
Win	29-10-1	(United States) Rubin Williams	UD	10	17/07/2010	(United States) 4 Bears Casino & Lodge, New Town, North Dakota	SNBC Cruiserweight Title.
Win	14-3-1	(United States) Anthony Greenidge	TD	8	03/06/2010	(United States) Coeur d'Alene Casino, Worley, Idaho	Bout was stopped at 1:21 of the eighth round.
Win	24-11-4	(United States) Donnell Wiggins	KO	2	24/10/2009	(United States) 4 Bears Casino & Lodge, New Town, North Dakota	Wiggins knocked out at 1:12 of the second round.
Loss	18-1	(United States) Matt Godfrey	UD	10	10/07/2009	(United States) Asylum Arena, Philadelphia, Pennsylvania	WBC NABF Cruiserweight Title.
Win	8-11-2	(United States) Jim Franklin	KO	3	22/11/2008	(United States) 4 Bears Casino & Lodge, New Town, North Dakota	Franklin knocked out at 2:06 of the third round.
Win	11-0-1	(United States) Joshua Green	KO	2	25/10/2008	(United States) Township Auditorium, Columbia, South Carolina	Green knocked out at 2:13 of the second round.
Win	8-8-2	(United States) Jim Franklin	KO	2	13/10/2007	(United States) Lode Star Casino, Fort Thompson, South Dakota	
Win	11-4-2	(United States) Bo Skipper	KO	1	14/07/2007	(United States) 4 Bears Casino & Lodge, New Town, North Dakota	Skipper knocked out at 2:57 of the first round.
Win	27-43-1	(United States) Dennis McKinney	KO	4	11/05/2007	(United States) Clearwater River Casino, Lewiston, Idaho	McKinney knocked out at 2:34 of the fourth round.
Draw	10-4-1	(United States) Ed C. Perry	PTS	8	16/03/2007	(United States) Seminole Hard Rock Hotel and Casino Hollywood, Hollywood, Florida	
Win	5-13-1	(United States) Karl Evans	TKO	1	29/09/2006	(United States) Camp Pendleton Marine Corps Base, Oceanside, California	Referee stopped the bout at 1:15 of the first round.
Win	17-5-1	(United States) Doug Kaluza	KO	2	29/07/2006	(United States) Qwest Arena, Boise, Idaho	Kaluza knocked out at 2:13 of the second round.
Win	6-2	(United States) Joe J. Evans	KO	2	28/04/2006	(United States) 4 Bears Casino & Lodge, New Town, North Dakota	Evans knocked out at 1:58 of the second round.
Win	10-3	(United States) Shane Fisher	TKO	2	27/10/2005	(United States) Coeur d'Alene Casino, Worley, Idaho	Referee stopped the bout at 2:13 of the second round.
Win	0-2	(United States) Paul Purcell	TKO	3	08/07/2005	(United States) Taco Bell Arena, Boise, Idaho	Referee stopped the bout at 2:29 of the third round.
Win	3-9	(United States) Ken Schomber	KO	1	16/06/2005	(United States) Coeur d'Alene Casino, Worley, Idaho	Schomber knocked out at 1:16 of the first round.
Win	--	(United States) Paul Purcell	UD	4	24/05/2005	(United States) Northern Quest Resort & Casino, Airway Heights, Washington	
Win	--	(United States) Leo Bercier	UD	4	15/04/2005	(United States) Northern Quest Resort & Casino, Airway Heights, Washington	
Win	0-1	(United States) Greg Benson	TKO	1	24/03/2005	(United States) Coeur d'Alene Casino, Worley, Idaho	Referee stopped the bout at 0:56 of the first round.
Win	1-3-1	(Uganda) Moses Matovu	TKO	3	25/02/2005	(United States) Bank of America Centre, Boise, Idaho	Referee stopped the bout at 2:35 of the third round.
Win	--	(United States) Leonard Sims	KO	4	04/02/2005	(United States) Quinault Resort & Casino, Ocean Shores, Washington	Sims knocked out at 1:26 of the fourth round.
Win	8-7-1	(United States) Neil Stephens	KO	1	02/12/2004	(United States) Northern Quest Resort & Casino, Airway Heights, Washington	Stephens knocked out at 2:50 of the first round.
Win	--	(United States) Miguel "Double M" Munoz	TKO	1	15/05/2004	(United States) 4 Bears Casino & Lodge, New Town, North Dakota	Referee stopped the bout at 1:38 of the first round.
