= Marty Lindquist =

American boxer

Martin Lindquist (born August 3, 1968) is a cruiserweight professional boxer from Minnesota.

== Professional career ==
Martin Lindquist had his professional debut in August 1994, knocking out Art Richardson in the first round. As of November 2008, Lindquist had compiled a professional record of 13 wins (9 by knockout) and 7 losses with 1 no contest.

== Controversy ==
Lindquist appeared to have given himself a great career boost on October 14 of 2006, when he knocked out undefeated prospect Max Alexander with one punch at the beginning of the first round. However, the fight was later ruled a no contest when Lindquist failed a drug test. The two had a rematch at The Blue Horizon fight club in February 2007, which Alexander won by unanimous decision.
