= Pradeep Singh Sihag =

Indian boxer (born 1986)

Personal information
- Nickname: The Indian Warrior
- Nationality: (India) Indian
- Born: 21 November 1986 (age 39) Sisai, Haryana, India
- Height: 5 ft 10 in (178 cm)
- Weight: Middleweight

Boxing career
- Stance: Orthodox

Boxing record
- Total fights: 23
- Wins: 18
- Win by KO: 9
- Losses: 4
- Draws: 1
- No contests: 0
Medal record
Men's Boxing
All India BD Chandiyala Boxing Championship
Silver medal – second place	2003	Middleweight
YMCA International Boxing Championship
Silver medal – second place	2004	Middleweight

Pradeep Singh Sihag (born 21 November 1986) is an Indian Professional boxer. As a professional he has won the IPBO, PABA, OPBF & WBC Asian Middleweight championship titles. He has a professional record of 18 wins, 4 losses and 1 draw. His amateur record stands at 120 wins with 3 losses.

== Early life ==
Born in Sisai, Haryana, Pradeep is the son of a former National Middleweight wrestling Champion and the brother of a former National Middleweight Amateur boxing Champion.

== Amateur career ==
As an amateur, Pradeep won the silver medal in the 2003 All India BD Chandiyala Boxing Championship and again took silver in the 2004 YMCA International Boxing Championship.

== Professional career ==
After evicted from commonwealth squad Pradeep made his pro boxing debut on 18 March 2005 at Australia. He early get and won his first title bout against Arama Tabuai for the vacant PABA Middleweight title. On 23 September 2010 Pradeep fought Sam Soliman for the IBF Pan Pacific middleweight title but didn't succeed.

On 11 November 2011, Singh won the vacant WBC Asian Boxing Council Middleweight title by defeating Yong Zhang. He lost his next fight to Yao Yi Ma at the Vodafone Arena, Fiji.

== Professional boxing record ==
18 Wins (9 knockouts), 4 Losses, 1 Draws
Res.	Record	Opponent	Type	Rd.	Date	Location	Notes
Loss	18-4-1	(Taiwan) Yao Yi Ma	TKO	8	2011-12-17	Vodafone Arena, Suva, Fiji	
Win	18-3-1	(China) Yong Zhang	UD	12	2011-11-11	Town Hall, Coburg, Victoria, Australia	Won vacant WBC Asian Boxing Council Middleweight title
Win	17-3-1	(Iran) Amir Ranjdar	TKO	3	2011-07-08	Town Hall, Malvern, Victoria, Australia	
Win	16-3-1	(Samoa) Peter Tovi'o	UD	6	2011-04-01	Town Hall, Malvern, Victoria, Australia	
Loss	15-3-1	(Australia) Sam Soliman	KO	10	2010-09-23	Racecourse - Atrium Room, Flemington, Victoria, Australia	For vacant IBF Pan Pacific Middleweight title
Loss	15-2-1	(Republic of the Congo) Sonni Michael Angelo	UD	5	2009-08-26	Olympic Park, Homebush, New South Wales, Australia	
Win	15-1-1	(Thailand) Dechapon Suwunnalird	UD	6	2009-07-24	Town Hall, Malvern, Victoria, Australia	
Loss	14-1-1	(Australia) Ryan Waters	DQ	7	2008-11-28	Cronulla Sutherland Leagues Club, Cronulla, New South Wales, Australia	For WBO Oriental Light middleweight title
Win	14-0-1	(New Zealand) Paz Viejo	UD	7	2008-07-25	Club Marconi, Bossley Park Sydney, Australia	
Draw	13-0-1	(Australia) William Hadlow	PTS	8	2007-05-11	Knox Netball Centre, Ferntree Gully, Victoria, Australia	
Win	13-0	(Thailand) Somchai Chimlum	UD	8	2007-03-24	Sports Stadium, Traralgon, Victoria, Australia	
Win	12-0	(Philippines) Arama Tabuai	TKO	1	2006-11-24	Knox Netball Centre, Ferntree Gully, Victoria, Australia	
Win	11-0	(Japan) Eiji Kano	UD	12	2006-07-28	Knox Netball Centre, Ferntree Gully, Victoria, Australia	Won vacant OPBF Middleweight title
Win	10-0	(South Korea) Pil-Seung Oh	TKO	6	2006-05-26	Knox Netball Centre, Ferntree Gully, Victoria, Australia	
Win	9-0	(Papua New Guinea) Juan Phillips	UD	6	2006-03-26	Ellerslie Racecourse, Auckland, New Zealand	
Win	8-0	(Czech Republic) Radek Hrabak	TKO	5	2006-02-24	Knox Netball Centre, Ferntree Gully, Victoria, Australia	Retained PABA Middleweight title
Win	7-0	(Thailand) Dechapon Suwunnalird	TKO	6	2005-12-09	Darebin Sports & Leisure Centre, Reservoir, Victoria, Australia	
Win	6-0	(New Zealand) Timo Masua	KO	6	2005-07-29	Knox Netball Centre, Ferntree Gully, Victoria, Australia	Retained PABA Middleweight title
Win	5-0	(Australia) Arama Tabuai	TKO	11	2005-07-02	Banyule Netball Stadium, Macleod, Victoria, Australia	Won vacant PABA Middleweight title
Win	4-0	(Thailand) Prawit Patavikorngym	KO	1	2005-05-27	Knox Netball Centre, Ferntree Gully, Victoria, Australia	
Win	3-0	(Australia) Brett Culey	UD	6	2005-05-07	St. Marys Band Club, St Marys, New South Wales, Australia	
Win	2-0	(Australia) Chris Collard	UD	4	2005-04-17	Town Hall, Moorabbin, Victoria, Australia	
Win	1-0	(New Zealand) Willie O'Neill	TKO	3	2005-03-18	Knox Netball Centre, Ferntree Gully, Victoria, Australia	Professional boxing debut.

== Titles in boxing ==
Awards and achievements
Regional titles
Vacant Title last held by (Russia) Dmitry Pirog	WBC Asian Boxing Council Middleweight Champion; 11 November 2011; Vacated	Vacant Title next held by (Australia) Les Sherrington
Other titles
Vacant Title last held by (New Zealand) Timo Masua	PABA Middleweight Champion; 2 July 2005; Vacated	Vacant Title next held by (Philippines) Nonoy Gonzales
Vacant Title last held by (Cameroon) Sakio Bika	OPBF Middleweight Champion; 28 July 2006; Vacated	Vacant Title next held by (Japan) Koji Sato
