= Sam Soliman =

Australian boxer

Personal information
- Nickname: King
- Born: 13 November 1973 (age 53) Melbourne, Victoria, Australia
- Height: 5 ft 9 in (175 cm)
- Weight: Light-middleweight; Middleweight; Super-middleweight; Light-heavyweight; Cruiserweight

Boxing career
- Reach: 71 1/2 in (182 cm)
- Stance: Orthodox

Boxing record
- Total fights: 71
- Wins: 49
- Win by KO: 19
- Losses: 19
- Draws: 1
- No contests: 2

Sam Soliman (born 13 November 1973) is an Australian professional boxer, and former kickboxer and mixed martial artist. In boxing, he held the International Boxing Federation (IBF) middleweight title in 2014, becoming the oldest middleweight world champion in history at the time.

== Kickboxing career ==
Soliman is a former world champion in kickboxing, and also competed in Muay Thai.

== Professional boxing career ==
Soliman made his professional boxing debut on 20 April 1997, defeating Heath Stenton by four-round unanimous decision (UD). In the first half of his career he won a multitude of regional titles, from light-middleweight to cruiserweight. He won the vacant Commonwealth middleweight title on 19 June 2000, scoring a ninth-round stoppage over Neville Brown. This reign was short-lived, as Soliman would lose a points decision to Howard Eastman a few months later on 16 September. His first world championship opportunity came on 7 March 2007, against Anthony Mundine for the vacant WBA super-middleweight title in an all-Australian showdown. After four knockdowns, Soliman lost by knockout in round nine. Later in the year, on 6 November, he finished third in the Contender series by defeating Wayne Johnsen by six-round UD. In a rematch against Mundine on 28 May 2008, this time with Mundine as defending champion, Soliman lost by UD.

The pinnacle of Soliman's career was on 31 May 2014, when he defeated multiple-time world champion Felix Sturm by UD to win the IBF middleweight title. They had previously fought on 1 February 2013, which was a fight marred afterwards by a drawn-out legal battle which took more than three years to resolve. Soliman was first announced to have failed a drug test in April 2013, which resulted in the German Boxing Federation ruling the fight a no contest and handing him a nine-month suspension in Germany. In October 2016, Soliman was exonerated by a German court which judged the Federation to have acted unlawfully, thus overturning the no contest result. However, in what would be yet another short-lived championship reign, Soliman lost by UD to former undisputed middleweight champion Jermain Taylor on 8 October 2014, enduring four knockdowns due to a debilitating knee injury.

== Outside of boxing ==
Soliman has worked with people in need, and closely with the Salvation Army. He has set up a gym and spends twice a week teaching fitness and wellbeing to homeless people. In 1996, he competed as a contestant on season three of Australian Gladiators.

== Professional boxing record ==
71 fights	49 wins	19 losses
By knockout	19	3
By decision	30	16
Draws	1	
No contests	2	

No.	Result	Record	Opponent	Type	Round, time	Date	Age	Location	Notes
71	Loss	49–19–1 (2)	Yuki Nonaka	UD	12	6 Apr 2024	50 years, 145 days	Sangyo Shinko Center, Sakai, Japan	
70	Loss	49–18–1 (2)	Alex Walters	UD	8	9 Dec 2023	50 years, 26 days	Orion Function Centre, Campsie, Australia	
69	Loss	49–17–1 (2)	Joel Camilleri	TKO	1 (8), 1:05	9 Dec 2022	49 years, 26 days	Pavilion, Melbourne, Australia	
68	Win	49–16–1 (2)	Troy O'Meley	TD	4 (8)	3 Jul 2022	48 years, 232 days	Pavilion, Melbourne, Australia	
67	Win	48–16–1 (2)	Jesse White	UD	8	19 Mar 2022	48 years, 126 days	Pavilion, Melbourne, Australia	
66	Win	47–16–1 (2)	Jesse White	SD	6	11 Dec 2021	48 years, 28 days	Pavilion, Melbourne, Australia	
65	Loss	46–16–1 (2)	Victor Nagbe	UD	10	10 Jul 2021	47 years, 239 days	Pavilion, Melbourne, Australia	
64	Loss	46–15–1 (2)	Sakio Bika	UD	8	31 Mar 2021	47 years, 138 days	Entertainment Centre, Newcastle, Australia	
63	Win	46–14–1 (2)	Mark Lucas	UD	12	12 Apr 2019	45 years, 150 days	Pavilion, Melbourne, Australia	Won vacant WBF (Foundation) middleweight title
62	NC	45–14–1 (2)	Tej Pratap Singh	NC	10	27 Jul 2018	44 years, 256 days	Pavilion, Melbourne, Australia	WBA Oceania middleweight title at stake; Originally MD win for Soliman, later ruled NC after incorrect referee calls
61	Draw	45–14–1 (1)	Wes Capper	MD	12	17 Mar 2018	44 years, 124 days	Pavilion, Melbourne, Australia	For vacant IBF International middleweight title
60	Win	45–14 (1)	Balazs Horvath	TKO	3 (10), 1:21	22 Apr 2017	43 years, 160 days	Pavilion, Melbourne, Australia	
59	Loss	44–14 (1)	Serhiy Derevianchenko	TKO	2 (12), 2:41	21 Jul 2016	42 years, 251 days	Foxwoods Resort Casino, Ledyard, Connecticut, US	
58	Loss	44–13 (1)	Dominic Wade	SD	12	26 Jun 2015	41 years, 225 days	Little Creek Casino Resort, Shelton, Washington, US	
57	Loss	44–12 (1)	Jermain Taylor	UD	12	8 Oct 2014	40 years, 329 days	Beau Rivage, Biloxi, Mississippi, US	Lost IBF middleweight title
56	Win	44–11 (1)	Felix Sturm	UD	12	31 May 2014	40 years, 199 days	König Palast, Krefeld, Germany	Won IBF middleweight title
55	Win	43–11 (1)	Les Sherrington	TKO	9 (12), 2:12	11 Dec 2013	40 years, 28 days	Pavilion, Melbourne, Australia	Won vacant PABA interim middleweight title
54	NC	42–11 (1)	Felix Sturm	NC	12	1 Feb 2013	39 years, 80 days	ISS Dome, Düsseldorf, Germany	
53	Win	42–11	Giovanni Lorenzo	UD	12	24 Aug 2012	38 years, 285 days	Geelong Arena, Geelong, Australia	
52	Win	41–11	Garth Wood	UD	12	19 Feb 2012	38 years, 98 days	State Sports Centre, Sydney, Australia	Won vacant IBF Pan Pacific interim middleweight title
51	Win	40–11	Eromosele Albert	UD	12	18 Nov 2011	38 years, 5 days	Pavilion, Melbourne, Australia	
50	Win	39–11	Pradeep Singh	KO	10 (12), 1:27	23 Sep 2010	36 years, 314 days	Flemington Racecourse Atrium Room, Melbourne, Australia	Won vacant IBF Pan Pacific middleweight title
49	Win	38–11	Shannon McMahon	TKO	11 (12), 2:20	13 Mar 2010	36 years, 120 days	Moonee Valley Racecourse, Melbourne, Australia	Won vacant WBF (Foundation) middleweight title
48	Win	37–11	Les Piper	TKO	7 (12), 1:43	4 Oct 2008	34 years, 326 days	Peninsula/Shed 14 at Docklands Central Pier, Melbourne, Australia	Won vacant IBF Australasian and WBF (Foundation) interim middleweight titles
47	Win	36–11	Sintung Kietbusaba	TKO	7 (12), 1:40	16 Aug 2008	34 years, 277 days	Peninsula/Shed 14 at Docklands Central Pier, Melbourne, Australia	Won vacant IBO Asia Pacific middleweight title
46	Loss	35–11	Anthony Mundine	UD	12	28 May 2008	34 years, 197 days	Vodafone Arena, Melbourne, Australia	For WBA super middleweight title
45	Win	35–10	Wayne Johnsen	UD	6	6 Nov 2007	33 years, 358 days	TD Banknorth Garden, Boston, Massachusetts, US	The Contender: season finale
44	Loss	34–10	Sakio Bika	UD	8	30 Oct 2007	33 years, 351 days	Contender Arena, Los Angeles, California, US	The Contender: semi-final
43	Win	34–9	Max Alexander	UD	5	18 Sep 2007	33 years, 309 days	Contender Arena, Los Angeles, California, US	The Contender: first round
42	Loss	33–9	Anthony Mundine	KO	9 (12), 2:26	7 Mar 2007	33 years, 114 days	Entertainment Centre, Sydney, Australia	For vacant WBA super middleweight title
41	Win	33–8	Enrique Ornelas	MD	10	17 Nov 2006	33 years, 4 days	Soboba Casino, San Jacinto, California, US	
40	Win	32–8	Raúl Jorge Muñoz	TKO	6 (10), 1:49	3 Mar 2006	32 years, 110 days	Pechanga Resort & Casino, Temecula, California, US	
39	Loss	31–8	Winky Wright	UD	12	10 Dec 2005	32 years, 27 days	Mohegan Sun Arena, Montville, Connecticut, US	
38	Win	31–7	Fernando Zuniga	UD	10	21 Jul 2005	31 years, 250 days	Tachi Palace Hotel & Casino, Lemoore, California, US	
37	Win	30–7	Miguel Julio	TKO	4 (10), 2:20	23 Feb 2005	31 years, 102 days	Vodafone Arena, Melbourne, Australia	
36	Win	29–7	Jose Alberto Clavero	KO	7 (10), 1:13	12 Dec 2004	31 years, 29 days	Panthers World of Entertainment, Sydney, Australia	
35	Win	28–7	Diego Castillo	TKO	4 (10), 2:35	6 Nov 2004	30 years, 359 days	University of Southern Queensland, Toowoomba, Australia	
34	Win	27–7	Raymond Joval	UD	12	18 Jul 2004	30 years, 248 days	Pechanga Resort & Casino, Temecula, California, US	
33	Win	26–7	Plaisakda Boonmalert	TKO	3 (10), 1:25	28 May 2004	30 years, 197 days	Panthers World of Entertainment, Sydney, Australia	
32	Win	25–7	Moechrody	TKO	3 (12)	16 Apr 2004	30 years, 155 days	Dandenong Stadium, Melbourne, Australia	Retained IBF Pan Pacific middleweight title
31	Win	24–7	Jorge Andres Sclarandi	TKO	8 (12), 0:01	7 Mar 2004	30 years, 115 days	Panthers World of Entertainment, Sydney, Australia	Retained IBF Pan Pacific middleweight title
30	Win	23–7	Juan Carlos Lettieri	KO	1 (12), 1:29	23 Jan 2004	30 years, 71 days	Panthers World of Entertainment, Sydney, Australia	Retained IBF Pan Pacific middleweight title
29	Win	22–7	Silvio Walter Rojas	TKO	4 (12)	5 Dec 2003	30 years, 22 days	Panthers World of Entertainment, Sydney, Australia	Retained IBF Pan Pacific middleweight title
28	Win	21–7	Satoru Suzuki	UD	12	1 Nov 2003	29 years, 353 days	Korakuen Hall, Tokyo, Japan	Retained OPBF middleweight title
27	Win	20–7	Tokutaro Toyozumi	SD	12	7 Sep 2003	29 years, 298 days	Masukicho Gym, Kumamoto, Japan	Won OPBF middleweight title
26	Win	19–7	Ramon Arturo Britez	UD	12	12 Aug 2003	29 years, 272 days	Albert Park Powerhouse, Melbourne, Australia	Retained IBF Pan Pacific middleweight title
25	Win	18–7	Nader Hamdan	UD	12	2 Jun 2003	29 years, 201 days	Panthers World of Entertainment, Sydney, Australia	Retained IBF Pan Pacific middleweight title
24	Win	17–7	Mike Cope	UD	10	6 Dec 2002	29 years, 23 days	State Netball and Hockey Centre, Melbourne, Australia	
23	Win	16–7	Sakio Bika	MD	12	15 Oct 2002	28 years, 336 days	Albert Park Powerhouse, Melbourne, Australia	Retained IBF Pan Pacific middleweight title
22	Win	15–7	Sean Sullivan	UD	12	24 Jul 2002	28 years, 253 days	Albert Park Powerhouse, Melbourne, Australia	Won vacant IBF Pan Pacific middleweight title
21	Win	14–7	Ojay Abrahams	PTS	4	15 Jun 2002	28 years, 214 days	Tottenham Green Leisure Centre, London, England	
20	Win	13–7	Eric Teymour	PTS	8	26 Apr 2002	28 years, 164 days	Thistle Hotel, Glasgow, Scotland	
19	Loss	12–7	Anthony Mundine	SD	12	3 Sep 2001	27 years, 294 days	Entertainment Centre, Wollongong, Australia	For vacant IBF Pan Pacific super-middleweight title
18	Win	12–6	Cornelius Carr	PTS	6	28 Feb 2001	27 years, 107 days	Royal Garden Hotel, London, England	
17	Loss	11–6	Raymond Joval	MD	MD	27 Jan 2001	27 years, 75 days	Jaap Edenhal, Amsterdam, Netherlands	For IBO middleweight title
16	Loss	11–5	Howard Eastman	PTS	12	16 Sep 2000	26 years, 308 days	York Hall, London, England	Lost Commonwealth middleweight title
15	Win	11–4	Neville Brown	TKO	9 (12)	19 Jun 2000	26 years, 219 days	Meadowside Leisure Centre, Burton, England	Won vacant Commonwealth middleweight title
14	Loss	10–4	Jerry Elliott	UD	8	6 May 2000	26 years, 175 days	Ballsporthalle, Frankfurt, Germany	
13	Win	10–3	Paul Wesley	UD	6	13 Apr 2000	26 years, 152 days	New Connaught Rooms, London, England	
12	Win	9–3	Sakeasi Dakua	TKO	4 (8)	4 Dec 1999	26 years, 21 days	Prince Charles Park, Nadi, Fiji	
11	Loss	8–3	Glen Kelly	UD	12	28 Sep 1999	25 years, 319 days	District Junior Rugby Football League, Sydney, Australia	For IBF Pan Pacific and Australian light-heavyweight titles
10	Win	8–2	Brad Mayo	UD	12	9 Jul 1999	25 years, 238 days	Wollongong, Australia	Won vacant Australian middleweight title
9	Win	7–2	Mosese Sorovi	TKO	11 (12)	7 May 1999	25 years, 175 days	Empire Theatre, Toowoomba, Australia	Won vacant Australian super-middleweight title
8	Win	6–2	Dale Westerman	UD	8	25 Oct 1998	24 years, 346 days	Glasshouse, Melbourne, Australia	
7	Win	5–2	Marty Fogas	UD	8	24 May 1998	24 years, 192 days	Crown, Melbourne, Australia	
6	Win	4–2	Marc Bargero	UD	8	17 Apr 1998	24 years, 155 days	Mount Pritchard Community Club, Sydney, Australia	
5	Win	3–2	Leon Rouse	UD	4	20 Feb 1998	24 years, 99 days	The Roxy, Boston, Massachusetts, US	
4	Loss	2–2	Adrian Bellin	SD	12	28 Nov 1997	24 years, 15 days	Corio Leisure Centre, Geelong, Australia	Lost Australian cruiserweight title
3	Loss	2–1	Kevin Kelly	UD	12	15 Aug 1997	23 years, 275 days	Marrickville RSL Club, Sydney, Australia	For Australian and vacant Commonwealth light-middleweight titles
2	Win	2–0	Peter Kinsella	KO	12 (12), 2:33	3 Jun 1997	23 years, 202 days	Southport RSL Club, Gold Coast, Australia	Won Australian cruiserweight title
1	Win	1–0	Heath Stenton	UD	4	20 Apr 1997	23 years, 158 days	Billboard Niteclub, Melbourne, Australia	

Sporting positions
Regional boxing titles
Preceded by Peter Kinsella	Australian cruiserweight champion 3 June 1997 – 28 November 1997	Succeeded by Adrian Bellin
Vacant Title last held by John Mugabi	Australian super-middleweight champion 7 May 1999 – July 1999; Vacated	Vacant Title next held by Marc Bargero
Vacant Title last held by Marc Bargero	Australian middleweight champion 9 July 1999 – October 1999; Vacated	Vacant Title next held by Marc Bargero
Vacant Title last held by Alain Bonnamie	Commonwealth middleweight champion 19 June 2000 – 16 September 2000	Succeeded by Howard Eastman
Vacant Title last held by Darren Obah	IBF Pan Pacific middleweight champion 24 July 2002 – 10 December 2005; Lost eliminator for world title	Vacant Title next held by Peter Mitrevski Jr.
Preceded by Tokutaro Toyozumi	OPBF middleweight champion 7 September 2003 – October 2004; Vacated	Vacant Title next held by Sakio Bika
Vacant Title last held by Ben Crampton	IBO Asia Pacific middleweight champion 16 August 2009 – October 2009; Vacated	Vacant Title next held by Luke Sharp
Vacant Title last held by Ben Crampton	IBF Australasian middleweight champion 4 October 2009 – 23 September 2010; Won Pan Pacific title	Vacant Title next held by Robbie Bryant
New title	IBF Pan Pacific middleweight champion Interim title 19 February 2012 – 24 August 2012; Won eliminator for world title	Vacant
Vacant Title last held by Dmitry Chudinov	PABA middleweight champion Interim title 11 December 2013 – May 2014; Vacated	Vacant Title next held by Mark Lucas
Minor world boxing titles
New title	WBF (Foundation) middleweight champion Interim title 4 October 2009 – 13 March 2010; Won full title	Vacant
Vacant Title last held by Kreshnik Qato	WBF (Foundation) middleweight champion 13 March 2010 – September 2010; Vacated	Vacant Title next held by Shannan Taylor
Vacant Title last held by Junior Castillo	WBF (Foundation) middleweight champion 12 April 2019 – 12 April 2019; Retired	Vacant
Major world boxing titles
Preceded by Felix Sturm	IBF middleweight champion 31 May 2014 – 8 October 2014	Succeeded by Jermain Taylor
Records
Preceded by Bernard Hopkins; Age 40	Oldest middleweight world champion Age 40; 31 May 2014 – 4 March 2023	Succeeded by Gennady Golovkin; Age 40
Preceded by Thulani Malinga; Age 40	Oldest boxer to win their first world title Age 40; 31 May 2014 – present	Incumbent
