= Parken Arena =

Proposed arena in Copenhagen, Denmark

Coordinates: 55°42′12″N 12°34′24″E

A new arena built next to Parken Stadium in Copenhagen was expected to be completed by December 2010. Due to the 2008 financial crisis and poor financials in 2009, Parken Sport & Entertainment chose to abolish the project.

The arena was designed by Hou + Partnere Arkitekter.

The arena was first named after the financial group Capinordic, but the company withdrew their sponsorship in January 2010.

It would have had a capacity of 4,500 at sport events and 8,500 for concerts and other cultural events. The total area would be about 13,000 square metres.

The arena was supposed to be home ground of the FCK Handball professional handball teams, but on 26 February 2010 the project was officially abolished.
