= Wayne Johnsen =

American boxer (born 1977)

Personal information
- Nickname: Lights Out
- Nationality: American
- Born: Wayne Johnsen; September 7, 1977 (age 49) Newark, New Jersey, U.S.
- Height: 6 ft (183 cm)
- Weight: Super Middleweight

Boxing career

Boxing record
- Total fights: 19
- Wins: 17
- Win by KO: 9
- Losses: 3
- Draws: 0
- No contests: 0

Wayne Johnsen (born September 7, 1977) is a professional American boxer.

== Family ==
Born and raised in Lyndhurst, New Jersey, Johnsen is a general contractor, and he has a son with his wife Gianna Caruso, his high school sweetheart. Both Wayne and Gianna have been inducted into the Hall of Fame at St. Mary High School in Rutherford, New Jersey, her for softball and him for football.

== Career ==
While on a football scholarship at the University of New Haven, Johnsen, a standout athlete in several sports, blew out his knee and turned to boxing to stay in shape for football. Johnsen was soon recognized in the boxing community as a rising star. The former NJ Golden Glove Finalist served as a sparring partner for world middleweight champion Jermain Taylor as Taylor prepared for his October 23 rematch against Bernard Hopkins.

Johnsen (16-1) won a unanimous decision recently on the under-card of the WBA Championship fight between Miguel Cotto and Zab Judah. Johnsen recently signed with Main Events.

== The Contender ==
He was one of the featured boxers on the boxing reality television series, The Contender 3, which premiered September 4, 2007 on ESPN. He was knocked out by Jaidon Codrington one minute and seventeen seconds into the first round of the sixth fight of the show. Johnsen lost the Bronze medal match versus Sam Soliman to finish in 4th place in the tournament.
