= Miguel Hernandez (boxer) =

American boxer

Miguel Hernandez (born September 21, 1974 in Chicago, Illinois) is an American boxer.

== Professional career ==
Known as "Macho", Miguel began his professional career in 2003. When he stepped up in competition, he lost both fights: to Raúl Márquez and to Luis Ramon Campas in 2006. He won two titles, the WBC USNBC title and the Illinois state title. He is currently beginning his career as a boxing trainer.
