= Jaidon Codrington =

American boxer

Personal information
- Nickname: The Don
- Nationality: American
- Born: Jaidon Olajuwon Codrington; June 5, 1984 (age 42) Bridgeport, Connecticut
- Height: 6 ft 2 in (1.88 m)
- Weight: Light Heavyweight

Boxing career
- Reach: 73"
- Stance: Orthodox

Boxing record
- Total fights: 25
- Wins: 21
- Win by KO: 17
- Losses: 4
- Draws: 0
- No contests: 0

Jaidon "The Don" Codrington (born June 5, 1984, in Bridgeport, Connecticut) is an American professional boxer. He fights at Light Heavyweight out of Queens, New York and had a record of 20 wins and 2 losses, with 16 wins by knockout.

A contestant on Season 3 of the boxing reality television series The Contender, Codrington went on to lose in the final to Sakio Bika, in a brave effort and a candidate for fight of the year.

== Amateur career ==
Codrington had a stellar amateur career, winning the 2002 National Golden Gloves Middleweight Championship.

=== Amateur highlights ===
2004

- Beat Dennis Draper in 2004 National Golden Gloves via decision on 2004-05-04.
- Lost to Rocco Tettis in 2004 National Golden Gloves via decision on 2004-05-05.

2003

- Beat James Parison in 2003 National Golden Gloves via decision (5–0) on 2003-05-26.
- Beat Donovan George in 2003 National Golden Gloves via decision (5–0) on 2003-05-28.
- Lost to Clarence Joseph in 2003 National Golden Gloves via decision (3–2) on 2003-05-29.

== Professional career ==
Jaidon Codrington's most notable fight has been a KO loss at the hands of Allan Green. In the fight Green gained notoriety for his blistering eighteen second KO victory against Jaidon Codrington. Green stunned Codrington and pinned him to the ropes, then threw brutal combinations before finishing with a left hook to the chin. The punch knocked Codrington unconscious and he fell through the ropes. The one round victory earned Green the 2005 Ring Magazine knockout of the year.

He was one of the featured boxers on the third season of The Contender on ESPN. In his first 5-Round Contender bout, he defeated Brian Vera via second-round knockout. He was the first boxer on the show to advance to the semifinals and the only one to win by knockout.

During the filming for The Contender his father died. Despite his grief he decided to continue in the competition, reaching the final with a first round stoppage in 1 min and 7 seconds of Wayne Johnsen in his semi-final bout.

On November 6, 2007, Codrington faced former world title challenger Sakio Bika in the Contender 3 finale at the Boston Garden in Boston, Massachusetts. The fight was wild, with both fighters being knocked down in the first round. In the end, Bika finished Codrington in the eighth round by referee stoppage (TKO).

Codrington now owns a gym in New York and Florida with Team Havoc.
