= Donny McCrary =

American boxer

Donny McCrary (born October 15, 1982 in St. Joseph, Missouri) is an Irish-American professional boxer.

== Professional career ==
Known as "The Savage", McCrary began his professional career in 2003, and has lost to contenders Lucian Bute, Kofi Jantuah, Allan Green, and Yuri Foreman. In 2007 he won via 1st round TKO against Eric Regan. Donny is now trained by former IBF World Champion Cool Vince Phillips.

On August 22, 2008, McCrary lost by 2nd-round TKO to Peter Manfredo. It was a terrible decision to stop the fight. Donny was not hurt and was ready to go. He was up at the count of two and responding and communicating with his corner. The fans were outraged by the stoppage.

== David Lemieux Fight ==
On October 3, 2009, McCrary fought David Lemieux in Montreal. The fight ended two minutes and seven seconds into the first round with McCary being knocked out. McCrary did not fight for over 3 years after that, losing by 5th-round TKO to Steve Franjic in December 2012.

=== Walid Smichet fight ===
In February 2006, McCrary, fought Walid Smichet, who was on a four-year unbeaten stretch, at the Montreal Casino.

McCrary landed some solid punches, especially in the second round. However, Smichet waved McCrary forward dismissively and then streamed forward, and towards the later rounds outworked McCrary.

The fight was over eight rounds and was scored a draw with one judge each giving the decision to either fighter and the other judging it a draw.

== The Contender (TV series) ==
In 2007, McCrary was one of the featured boxers on the 3rd season of the boxing reality TV series, The Contender.
