= Humble High School =

Coordinates: 29.9817°N 95.2477°W

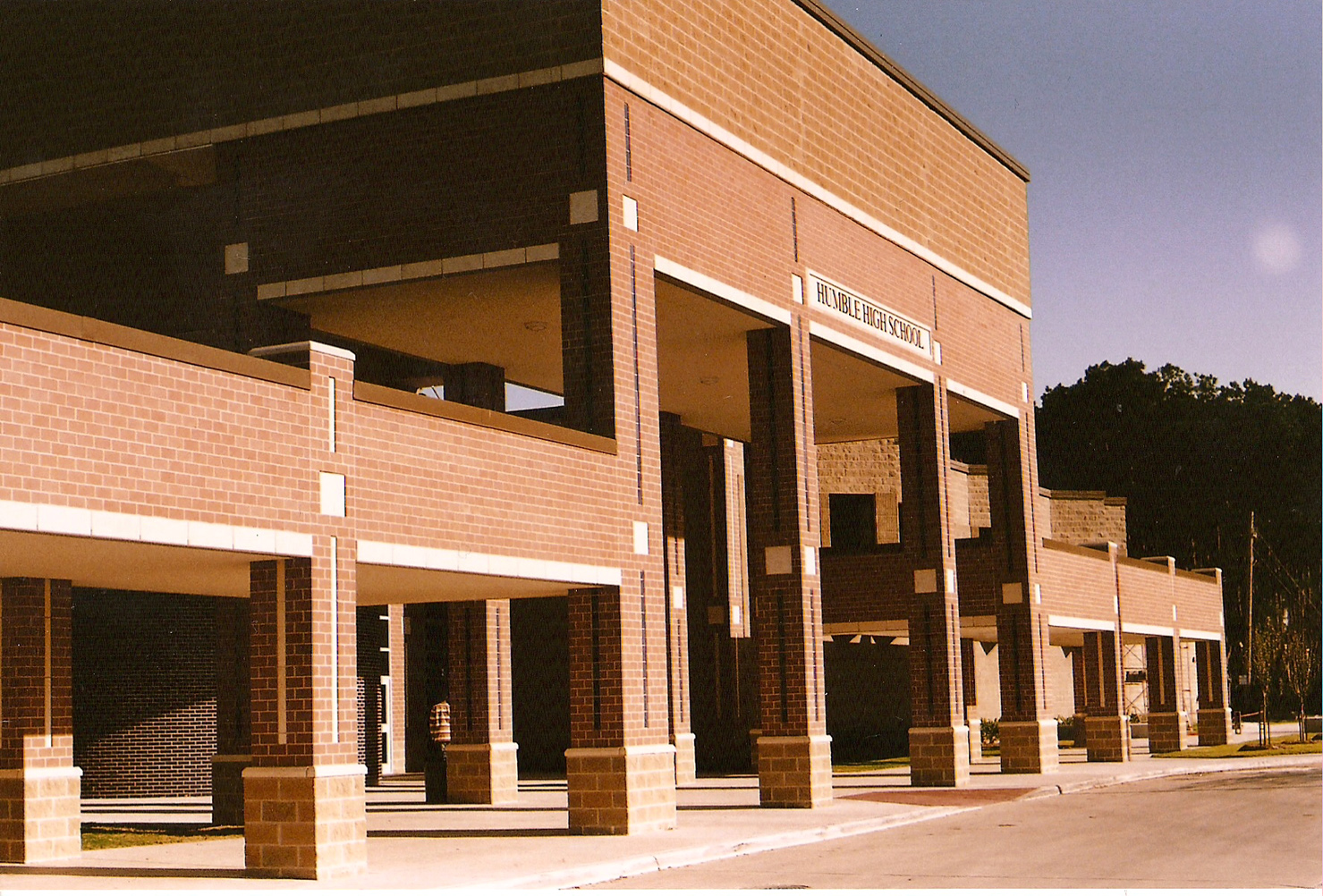
- Humble High campus

Location
- 1700 Wilson Road; Humble, Texas 77338; United States

Information
- Funding type: Public
- Opened: 1965
- School district: Humble Independent School District
- Superintendent: Elizabeth Celania-Fagen
- Principal: Courtney Peterson
- Faculty: 187.41 FTE (2023–2024)
- Grades: 9–12
- Enrollment: 2,917 (2023–2024)
- Student to teacher ratio: 15.56 (2023–2024)
- Campus type: Suburban
- Colors: Purple & White
- Athletics conference: 6A
- Mascot: Wildcat
- Rival: Kingwood High School
- Newspaper: The Pride
- Yearbook: The Wildcat
- Website: Humble High School

Humble High School (HHS) is a secondary school in the Humble Independent School District in Humble, Texas, United States. It serves grades 9 through 12 for the city of Humble, the Moonshine Hill area of Houston, and unincorporated communities north of Beltway 8. The campus serves the entire Humble area and the western part of Atascocita. In 2016, a portion of the upstairs main building was refurbished for the rezoning of Quest Early College High School (QECHS) completely independent from HHS.

== History ==
Before 1918, students attended a single building, the Humble School, which housed grades 1-11. The first high school graduates in Humble graduated from this school in 1911.

The first school building, Humble High School, opened in 1918 on Higgins Avenue. In 1929, it was relocated to a new building, next door, as Charles Bender High School.

It became Humble High School again and moved to its present location at 1700 Wilson Road, in 1965. The original Charles Bender High School building still stands on Higgins Avenue. The original 1918 Humble High School building was demolished in 1955.

Until 2007, ninth grade students attended the Humble Ninth Grade Campus, adjacent to the Humble High campus at 1131 Wilson Road. That building was refurbished into Ross Sterling Middle School in 2007, and the ninth graders moved into the newly completed freshman annex at the high school.

=== Student enrollment ===
Before the opening of Atascocita High School in 2006, HHS had a population of over 5,000 students. Clearly overcrowded, AHS was opened to meet the large population growth in the Atascocita area. Continued growth in the southern portion of the district led to the opening of Summer Creek High School in 2009. This caused Humble to be reclassified as a 4A school by the UIL in 2010 with a fall 2010 enrollment of 1,651 students.

=== 2007 Renovation ===
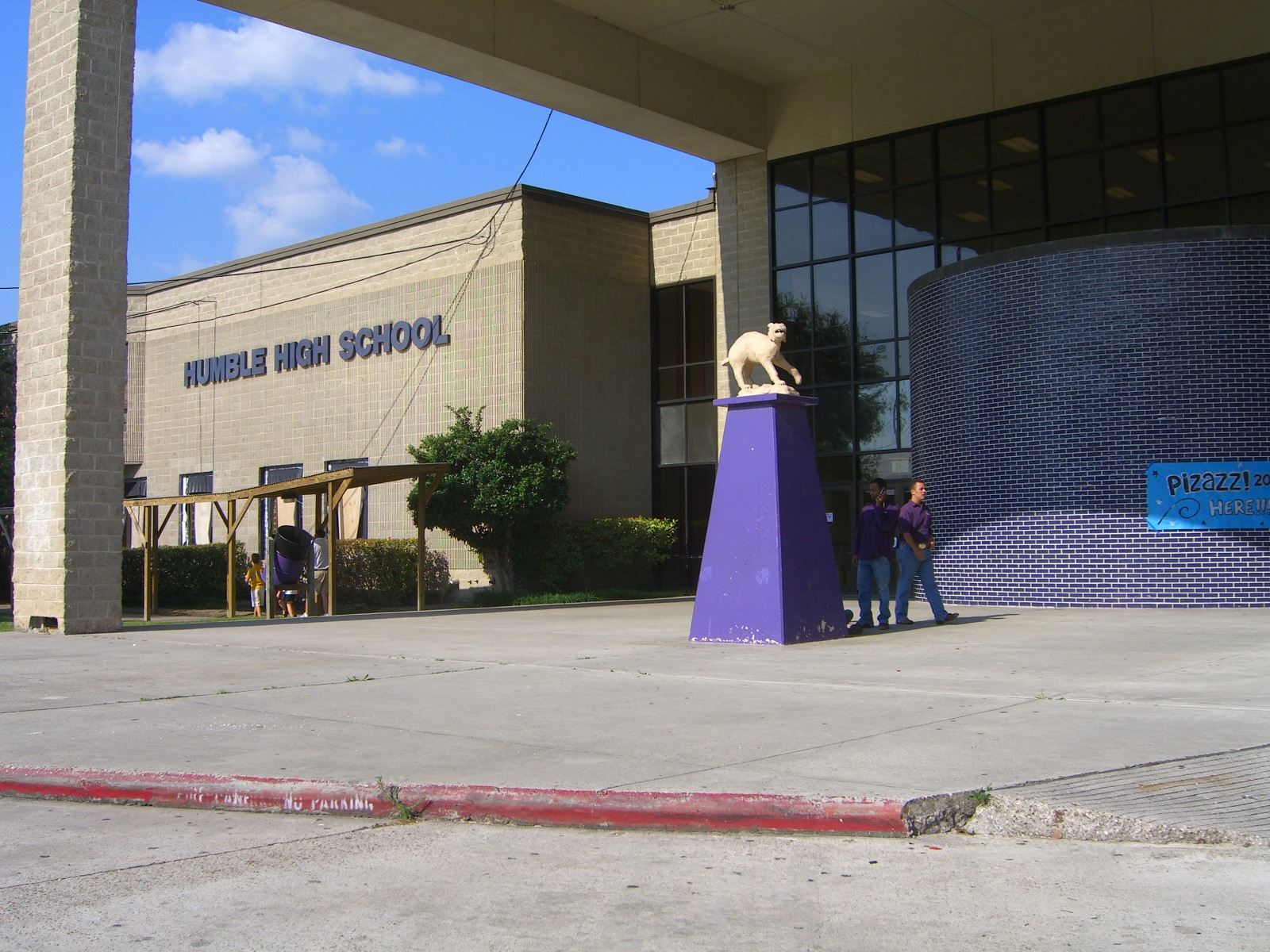
Humble High School before the renovation

After the opening of AHS, Humble High School underwent a major makeover in 2007. The school was reformatted with six houses (similar to format used by AHS) to give students more personalized attention. Renovations also allowed HHS to comply with the Texas Education Agency's standards for class size. Bond funds paid for a new two-story classroom wing to replace the 40-year-old classroom wing. The school gained 15 science classrooms, three teaching theaters, seven business labs, practice areas for dance and drill team, and a new black box theater. Throughout the school, there is new carpet and paint. New electrical, plumbing and air-conditioning systems were installed. In total, 103,000 square feet (9,600 m^{2}) was added and 355,000 square feet (33,000 m^{2}) was renovated.

=== 2021-2022 Renovation ===
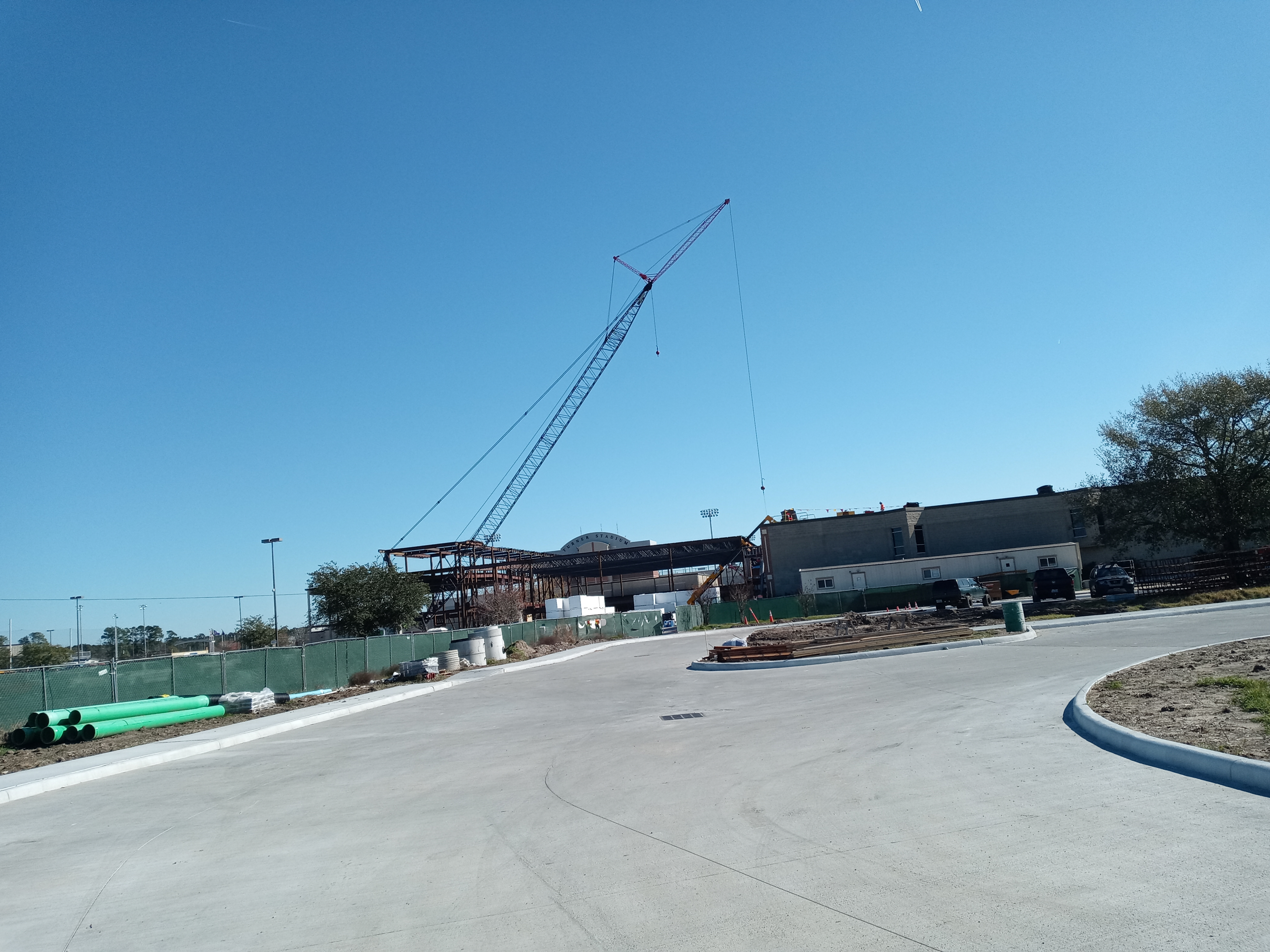
The building exterior during construction in 2022.

On 30 October 2020, a groundbreaking ceremony took place for a major renovation to the school. The renovations at HHS include a modern cafeteria, library, performing arts theatre, a Career and Technical Education wing and athletics wing. The final point will see the creation of a competition and auxiliary gym. It is planned to be completed by August 2022 and will increase the campus size by just over 63,000 square feet to nearly 552,000 total square feet.

== Principals ==
The following persons have served as Principal of Humble High School.

Name	Years served	Notes
Frances Ruth Hyde	1918-1919	
J. Preston Crim	1919-1920	
W. A. Franklin	1920-1923	
Hugo Hartsfield	1923-1927	
Albert Guy Moseley	1927-1930	
Frank W. Allenson	1930-1933	
V. W. Miller	1933-1936	
D. H. Blackmon	1936-1940	
H. C. England	1940-1942	
Albert A. Pierce	1942-1946	
Kenneth A. Miller	1946-1950	
A. J. Labay	1950-1951	
Elliott Curtis	1951-1970	
Bobby Bruce Smith	1970-1984	
David Bishop	1984-2003	
Raul Font	2003-July 2007	
Larry Johnson	July–December 2007	Died in office
Charles Ned	2007-2016	
Donna Ullrich	2016–2019	
Terri Osborne	2019–2022	
Dairus Cosby	2022–2025	
Courtney Peterson	2025–Present	

== Academics ==
For the 2018–2019 school year, the school received a C grade from the Texas Education Agency, with an overall score of 79 out of 100. The school received a B grade in two domains, Student Achievement (score of 81) and School Progress (score of 82), and a C grade in Closing the Gaps (score of 73). The school did not receive any of the seven possible distinction designations.

=== Languages ===
Humble High School offers language courses including Spanish, French, and American Sign Language. Although German and Latin were offered in the past, after a decrease in interest, the course was removed from the curriculum. Spanish and French are offered at the IB level, with AP courses being taught in Spanish and French as well.

=== Special programs ===
==== International Baccalaureate ====
The International Baccalaureate program was introduced to Humble High in the beginning of the 2007-2008 year, after interviewing applicants a year earlier. The 2009 class was the first IB students to graduate from Humble High School with an IB diploma. Although IB Music Theory was offered in the past the course was eventually removed from the curriculum in the 2017-2018 year.

==== T-STEM Academy ====
The HHS T-STEM Academy was introduced to the school during the 2016-2017 year following its designation by the Texas Education Agency earlier that year, with 50 students initially and adding 50 more each school year. The academy combines college preparatory curriculum with STEM themes. At most, the academy will serve a maximum of 400 high school students. The goal of the academy is to provide a college-style curriculum while readying students to pursue pathways in the STEM fields. The required degree plan will include 15-45 credit hours at no charge provided by the local Lone Star College in Kingwood.

==== Other programs ====
Besides IB, the school offers AVID, a program designed to aid and prepare economically disadvantaged and academically top-generation honors students from middle to high school into college. Humble High is also the only high school in Humble ISD to offer a cosmetology course.

== Activities ==
The HHS supports 19 main extracurricular activities on its campus.

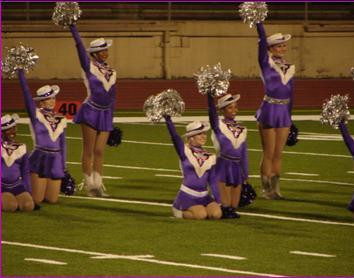
WildCatdets

- Academic Team
- Army JROTC
- Band (including the Wildcat Marching Band)
- Choir
- Color Guard
- Campus Crusade for Christ
- Debate
- National FFA Organization
- Key Club
- National Art Honor Society
- National Honor Society
- Orchestra
- Spanish Club
- Student Council
- The Pride Newspaper
- Theatre
- WildCatdets
- Yearbook

=== JROTC ===
The JROTC program was introduced in 2002 and is currently the seniormost JROTC unit in Humble ISD as well as one of two United States Army programs in the district. Every Veterans Day since 2007, the program hosts the Wildcat Salute to Veterans ceremony in the school's commons area, in which cadets from the program guard a replica of the Tomb of the Unknown Soldier in Arlington National Cemetery. During the 2016 ceremony, state representative Dan Huberty presented the unit with the Flag of Texas that was flown over the state capital in honor of the holiday. As of 2019, the makeshift tomb is guard throughout the entirety of the school day. Outside of the ROTC program, a members of the band performs Taps while the floral program create the wreath that will be laid. Since 2013, the program has provided flag holders at the annual Humble Police Memorial Ceremony in May at the Humble Civic Center. In June 2019, the JROTC Academic Team took part in the JROTC Leadership and Academic Bowl (JLAB) in Washington D.C., where it competed against other JROTC units around the world.

=== Choir ===
Years of Regional UIL Choral & Sight-Reading Sweepstakes

- 2005 Treble Chorus^* (B)
- 2006 Mixed Chorus* (A)
- 2006 Treble Chorus^ (B)
- 2018 Treble Chorus^ (C)

^Denoting Sub-Varsity

*Denoting Varsity

=== Band ===
==== Marching ====
Years of Regional UIL Marching Sweepstakes

(note: records before 2004 not available)

- 2004 (region 19)
- 2005 (region 19)
- 2006 (region 19)
- 2017* (region 33)
- 2018* (region 33)
- 2019 (region 33)
- 2021* (region 33)

*Denoting Advancement to the Area Marching Band Contest

==== Concert & Sight-Reading ====
Years of Regional UIL Concert & Sight-Reading Sweepstakes

- 2005* (A)
- 2006* (A)
- 2007* (RMA)
- 2010^ (1)
- 2011* (B)
- 2015* (B)
- 2021*^

^Denoting Symphonic

*Denoting Wind Symphony

==== State Solo & Ensemble Contest ====
note: records before 2017 are not available

- 2017 Clarinet Ensemble
- 2017 Brass Quartet
- 2018 Trumpet Solo
- 2018 Brass Quintet
- 2019 Clarinet Trio
- 2019 Clarinet Trio
- 2019 Flute Quartet
- 2019 Saxophone Quartet
- 2019 Misc. Woodwind Ensemble
- 2019 Trumpet Solo
- 2019 Four Brass

=== Orchestra ===
Years of Regional UIL String Orchestra Sweepstakes

- 2011*
- 2013^
- 2015^
- 2018^*

^Denoting Symphonic

*Denoting Chamber

==== State Solo & Ensemble Contest ====
note: records before 2017 are not available

- 2018 Violin Solo (1)
- 2018 String Quartet (1)
- 2018 String Quartet (1)

== Alumni ==
=== Alumni association ===
In 1932, there began to be celebrations of school alumni. Ever since then, there have been annual reunions of school alumni. Since 1997, the alumni association has given out scholarships sponsored by its own. In 2020, for the first time, the annual reunion was cancelled.

=== Notable alumni ===
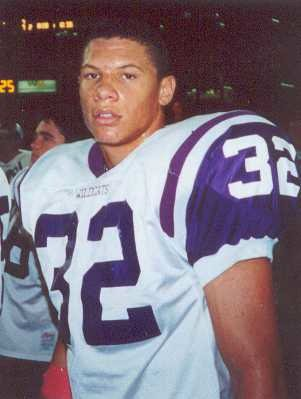
Battle when he was a part of the Humble High School Football team.

- Jackie Battle, running back for the Dallas Cowboys, Kansas City Chiefs;San Diego Chargers and Tennessee Titans
- Bertrand Berry, former defensive end for Arizona Cardinals
- Bizzle, Christian Rapper
- David Givens, former wide-receiver for Tennessee Titans New England Patriots
- David Boston, Ohio State Buckeye star and former pro-bowler and NFL wide-receiver
- Sammy Davis, NFL football player. 1st round, 30th overall draft pick of the San Diego Chargers in 2003.
- Kimberly Holland, Playboy Playmate
- David Kersh, country music singer
- Jerrod Johnson, NFL Football Quarterback, Texans Quarterbacks Coach
- A.J. Morris, Major League pitcher, currently with the Cincinnati Reds
- Joel Osteen, author and pastor
- Franka Potente, actress, exchange student
- Jonathan Tamayo, 2024 World Series of Poker Main Event champion

== Feeder patterns ==
Elementary schools that feed into Humble High School include:

- Jack Fields
- Humble
- Lakeland
- North Belt
- River Pines
- Park Lakes
- Whispering Pines

Middle schools that feed into Humble High School include:

- Humble Middle School
- Ross Sterling Middle School
