= Juan Carlos Candelo =

Colombian boxer (born 1974)

Personal information
- Nickname: J.C.
- Nationality: Colombian
- Born: Juan Carlos García; January 10, 1974 (age 52) Buenaventura, Colombia
- Height: 1.80 m (5 ft 11 in)
- Weight: Light middleweight

Boxing career
- Reach: 183 cm (72 in)
- Stance: Orthodox

Boxing record
- Total fights: 50
- Wins: 32
- Win by KO: 21
- Losses: 14
- Draws: 4
- No contests: 0

Juan Carlos García (born January 10, 1974) is a Colombian former professional boxer who competed from 1995 to 2014. He challenged for the IBF light middleweight title in 2003.

== Professional career ==
Candelo last fought in 2014, losing by TKO to Abraham Han. His professional record was 32–14–4, with 24 KOs.

== Professional boxing record ==
50 fights	32 wins	14 losses
By knockout	21	4
By decision	9	10
By disqualification	2	0
Draws	4	

No.	Result	Record	Opponent	Type	Round, time	Date	Location	Notes
50	Loss	32–14–4	Abraham Han	TKO	2 (10), 2:17	Apr 5, 2014	County Coliseum, El Paso, Texas, U.S.	For vacant UBF Inter-Continental middleweight title
49	Loss	32–13–4	Jermain Taylor	TKO	7 (10), 2:58	Dec 14, 2013	Alamodome, San Antonio, Texas, U.S.	
48	Loss	32–12–4	Fernando Guerrero	TKO	6 (10), 0:12	Nov 3, 2012	Humble Civic Center, Humble, Texas, U.S.	
47	Loss	32–11–4	Raul Casarez	UD	8	Mar 17, 2012	Convention Center, Pharr, Texas, U.S.	
46	Win	32–10–4	Justin Flanagan	TKO	7 (12), 0:53	May 12, 2011	Dallas, Texas, U.S.	Retained WBC-USNBC light middleweight title
45	Win	31–10–4	Chase Shields	DQ	7 (12), 0:38	Nov 4, 2010	Dallas Petroleum Club, Dallas, Texas, U.S.	Won WBC-USNBC light middleweight title; Shields disqualified for headbutt
44	Win	30–10–4	Deon Nash	UD	6	Mar 18, 2010	Charles T. Doyle Convention Center, Texas City, Texas, U.S.	
43	Win	29–10–4	Chase Shields	RTD	7 (8), 3:00	Dec 3, 2009	The Houston Club, Houston, Texas, U.S.	
42	Win	28–10–4	Julio Pérez	TKO	4 (6), 2:40	Aug 14, 2009	Houston Hobby Marriot, Houston, Texas, U.S.	
41	Loss	27–10–4	James Moore	UD	10	Mar 15, 2008	Madison Square Garden, New York City, New York, U.S.	
40	Win	27–9–4	Anthony Greeley	UD	6	May 3, 2007	Anatole Hotel, Dallas, Texas, U.S.	
39	Loss	26–9–4	Verno Phillips	UD	10	Apr 5, 2006	New Orleans Arena, New Orleans, Louisiana, U.S.	
38	Draw	26–8–4	Teddy Reid	SD	10	Jan 20, 2006	Foxwoods Resort, Ledyard, Connecticut, U.S.	
37	Loss	26–8–3	Marco Antonio Rubio	UD	10	Mar 10, 2005	Municipal Audotorium, San Antonio, Texas, U.S.	
36	Loss	26–7–3	Eduardo Sánchez	UD	12	Aug 13, 2004	Pechanga Resort Casino, Temecula, California, U.S.	For inaugural GBU Americas light middleweight title
35	Loss	26–6–3	Kassim Ouma	TKO	10 (12), 0:15	Jan 3, 2004	Foxwoods Resort, Ledyard, Connecticut, U.S.	
34	Win	26–5–3	Julio García	TKO	8 (12), 2:32	Jul 26, 2003	Sam's Town Caisno, Tunica, Mississippi, U.S.	Retained WBC-NABF light middleweight title
33	Loss	25–5–3	Winky Wright	UD	12	Mar 1, 2003	Thomas & Mack Center, Paradise, Nevada, U.S.	For IBF light middleweight title
32	Win	25–4–3	Ángel Hernández	UD	12	Dec 13, 2002	Pechanga Resort Casino, Temecula, California, U.S.	Won WBC-NABF light middleweight title
31	Win	24–4–3	Alfred Ankamah	UD	10	Jun 27, 2002	Santa Ana Star Casino, Bernalillo, New Mexico, U.S.	
30	Loss	23–4–3	Ángel Hernández	UD	12	Jan 12, 2002	Cox Pavilion, Paradise, Nevada, U.S.	For vacant WBC-NABF light middleweight title
29	Win	23–3–3	Kevin Tillman	UD	10	May 3, 2001	Argosy Festival Atrium, Baton Rouge, Louisiana, U.S.	
28	Win	22–3–3	Ron Johnson	TKO	4 (10), 2:33	Jan 26, 2001	Ramada Inn, Rosemont, Illinois, U.S.	
27	Win	21–3–3	Michael Lerma	UD	10	Aug 25, 2000	Casino Magic, Bay St. Louis, Mississippi, U.S.	
26	Win	20–3–3	Tony Badea	UD	10	Jun 9, 2000	Turning Stone Resort Casino, Verona, New York, U.S.	
25	Win	19–3–3	Mario Iribarren	TKO	4 (10), 0:27	May 5, 2000	Cherokee Casino, Cherokee, North Carolina, U.S.	
24	Win	18–3–3	Gary Jones	KO	9 (10), 2:59	Mar 17, 2000	Magness Arena, Denver, Colorado, U.S.	
23	Loss	17–3–3	Alex Bunema	SD	10	Jan 28, 2000	The Ruins, New Orleans, Louisiana, U.S.	
22	Loss	17–2–3	Michael Lerma	SD	10	Dec 5, 1999	Casino Magic, Bay St. Louis, Mississippi, U.S.	
21	Win	17–1–3	Johnny Rivera	TKO	4 (10)	Jul 25, 1999	Ponce, Puerto Rico	
20	Win	16–1–3	Melvin Cardona	TKO	5 (10)	Jun 18, 1999	Saint Thomas, U.S. Virgin Islands	
19	Win	15–1–3	Gary Richardson	KO	2 (10)	Nov 25, 1997	Baton Rouge, Louisiana, U.S.	
18	Win	14–1–3	Wilfredo Vázquez	TKO	5 (12)	Sep 2, 1997	Belle of Baton Rouge Casino, Baton Rouge, Louisiana, U.S.	
17	Win	13–1–3	Paulo Alejandro Sánchez	KO	1 (10), 1:22	Jun 27, 1997	Mahi Temple Shrine Auditorium, Miami, Florida, U.S.	
16	Win	12–1–3	Ailton Pessoa	TKO	2 (8)	May 10, 1997	Palacio de los Deportes, Heredia, Costa Rica	
15	Win	11–1–3	Kenny Louis	TKO	2 (6), 2:00	Feb 8, 1007	Greenville, Mississippi, U.S.	
14	Win	10–1–3	Derrick Coleman	MD	6	Nov 23, 1996	Hollywood, Florida, U.S.	
13	Win	9–1–3	Gary Smith	TKO	4 (6)	Aug 30, 1996	International Ballroom, Atlanta, Georgia, U.S.	
12	Win	8–1–3	John Jeter	TKO	2 (6)	Jul 21, 1996	Kenner, Louisiana, U.S.	
11	Win	7–1–3	Gavin Coleman	KO	6 (6)	Jun 16, 1996	Casino Magic, Bay St. Louis, Mississippi, U.S.	
10	Win	6–1–3	Narciso Aleman	MD	6	May 5, 1996	Grand Casino, Biloxi, Mississippi, U.S.	
9	Win	5–1–3	Daryn Thomas	KO	4 (4)	Apr 16, 1996	Casino Magic, Bay St. Louis, Mississippi, U.S.	
8	Win	4–1–3	Alton Madison	TKO	2 (6)	Feb 15, 1996	Cobb Galleria Center, Atlanta, Georgia, U.S.	
7	Draw	3–1–3	David Mealancon	PTS	4	Nov 3, 1995	Performing Arts Theater, New Orleans, Louisiana, U.S.	
6	Draw	3–1–2	Jackie Eberhart	TD	1 (4)	Oct 21, 1995	Doraville Arena, Doraville, Georgia, U.S.	
5	Loss	3–1–1	Orin Osbey	PTS	4	Sep 19, 1995	Casino Magic, Bay St. Louis, Mississippi, U.S.	
4	Draw	3–0–1	Mike Tutt	PTS	4	Aug 11, 1995	Harrah's Casino, New Orleans, Louisiana, U.S.	
3	Win	3–0	Jyri Kjäll	TKO	1 (6)	Jun 18, 1995	Performing Arts Theater, New Orleans, Louisiana, U.S.	
2	Win	2–0	Jackie Eberhart	DQ	1 (4)	Apr 28, 1995	Memorial Gym, Rome, Georgia, U.S.	
1	Win	1–0	Jack Williams	TKO	3 (4)	Jan 27, 1995	Doraville, Georgia, U.S.	
