= Fernando Guerrero (boxer) =

American boxer

Personal information
- Nationality: American
- Born: Fernando Guerrero De La Cruz; October 12, 1986 (age 39) Dominican Republic
- Height: 1.75 m (5 ft 9 in)
- Weight: Middleweight

Boxing career
- Stance: Southpaw

Boxing record
- Total fights: 32
- Wins: 28
- Win by KO: 20
- Losses: 4
- Draws: 0

Fernando Guerrero De La Cruz (born 12 October 1986) is a Dominican-born American middleweight professional boxer.

== Early life ==
Guerrero was born in the Dominican Republic and also has Haitian roots from his father's side of the family. His parental grandfather's surname was Guerrier. He moved to Salisbury, Maryland as a youth and attended Parkside High School.

== Amateur career ==
Guerrero began to get noticed at age 16, when he competed in competitions at the US National Junior Olympics and World Cadet Junior Olympics. He defeated favored Shawn Porter. He won a silver medal at the 2006 National Golden Gloves Tournament and went on to win the National AAU championship at middleweight. He defeated Shawn Porter and several other notable US Amateurs at the 2007 Golden Gloves tournament and for the 2007 US Championship; however, Porter won their final amateur encounter at the 2008 US Olympic trials, eventually losing to 2008 US Olympian Shawn Estrada.

== Professional career ==
Guerrero has been featured on Showtime's ShoBox: The New Generation and ESPN's Friday Night Fights. On October 10, 2009, he won his first professional title in front of 5,000 hometown fans at an outdoor match with light rain earlier in the day and cool temperatures. Fernando Guerrero's manager and trainer is Hal Chernoff, co-trainer is Barry Hunter. Prize Fight Boxing, best known for promoting the largest pay-per-view boxing event in history through 2007 (Lewis vs. Tyson), is his promoter. Guerrero's hometown venue, the Wicomico Civic Center in Salisbury, holds the record for the largest crowd at a professional boxing match in the state of Maryland due to his hometown support.

=== Quillin vs. Guerrero ===
Fernando Guerrero (25-1, 19 KO) secured his first world title shot against undefeated middleweight champion Peter Quillin (28-0, 20 KO) for the WBO middleweight title on April 27, 2013 on the undercard of Danny Garcia vs. Zab Judah. The title bout took place at the Barclays Center in Brooklyn, New York. Quillin started strong and scored two knockdowns in the second round while arguably dominating the first five rounds of the fight. In the sixth round Guerrero showed life as he was able to land good shots against Quillin. After a good sixth round by Guerrero, Quillin was able to end the fight by scoring two more knockdowns in the seventh round, resulting in the referee awarding Quillin the TKO victory.

== Professional boxing record ==
28 Wins (20 knockouts, 8 decisions), 4 Losses (4 knockouts, 0 decisions), 0 Draws
Res.	Record	Opponent	Type	Rd., Time	Date	Location	Notes
Loss	28-4	(United States) Tony Harrison	TKO	6 (10)	2016-03-05	(United States) Sands Bethlehem Event Center, Bethlehem, Pennsylvania	
Win	28-3	(United States) Daniel Souza Santos	TKO	7 (8)	2015-11-13	(United States) Beau Rivage Resort & Casino, Biloxi, Mississippi	
Win	27-3	(United States) Abraham Han	SD	10 (10)	2015-04-18	(United States) StubHub Center, Carson, California	
Loss	26-3	(Canada) David Lemieux	KO	3 (12)	2014-05-24	(Canada) Bell Centre, Montreal, Quebec	For WBC-NABF middleweight title
Win	26-2	(United States) Raymond Gatica	UD	10 (10)	2013-11-11	(United States) Cowboys Dance Hall, San Antonio, Texas	
Loss	25-2	(United States) Peter Quillin	TKO	7 (12)	Apr 27, 2013	(United States) Barclays Center, Brooklyn, New York	For WBO middleweight title
Win	25-1	(Colombia) Juan Carlos Candelo	TKO	6 (10)	2012-11-03	(United States) Humble Civic Center Arena, Humble, Texas	
Win	24-1	(Mexico) Jose Medina	UD	10 (10)	2012-07-14	(United States) Mandalay Bay Resort & Casino, Las Vegas, Nevada	
Win	23-1	(Canada) Jason Naugler	TKO	4 (8)	2012-02-18	(Mexico) Grand Oasis Resort, Cancun, Quintana Roo	
Win	22-1	(United States) Robert Kliewer	TKO	5 (8)	10 Dec 2011	(United States) Convention Center, Washington, District of Columbia	
Loss	21-1	(United States) Grady Brewer	TKO	4 (10)	2011-06-17	(United States) Frank Erwin Center, Austin, Texas	For WBC-NABF super welterweight title
Win	21-0	(United States) Derrick Findley	UD	10 (10)	2011-02-18	(United States) Wicomico Civic Center, Salisbury, Maryland	Retained WBC-NABF middleweight title
Win	20-0	(Mexico) Saul Duran	TKO	4 (10)	2010-11-20	(United States) Boardwalk Hall, Atlantic City, New Jersey	
Win	19-0	(United States) Ishe Smith	UD	10 (10)	2010-07-16	(United States) DeSoto Civic Center, Southaven, Mississippi	Won vacant WBC-NABF middleweight title
