= Andy Lee (boxer) =

Irish boxer

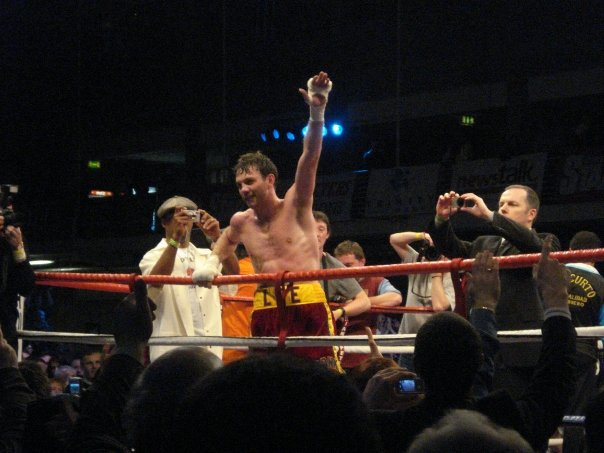
- Lee celebrating a win in Limerick, 2008

Personal information
- Nickname: "Irish"
- Nationality: Irish
- Born: 11 June 1984 (age 42) Bow, London, England
- Height: 6 ft 2 in (188 cm)
- Weight: Light-middleweight; Middleweight; Super-middleweight

Boxing career
- Reach: 75 in (191 cm)
- Stance: Southpaw

Boxing record
- Total fights: 39
- Wins: 35
- Win by KO: 24
- Losses: 3
- Draws: 1
Medal record
Men's amateur boxing
Representing Ireland
European Championships
Bronze medal – third place	2004 Pula	Middleweight
EU Championships
Silver medal – second place	2004 Madrid	Middleweight
World Junior Championships
Silver medal – second place	2002 Santiago de Cuba	Middleweight

Andy Lee (born 11 June 1984) is an Irish former professional boxer who competed from 2006 to 2017. He held the WBO middleweight title from 2014 to 2015, and in doing so became the first member of the travelling community to win a major world title. He is the second cousin of Former lineal heavyweight champion Tyson Fury. During his professional career, Lee was trained by the late Emmanuel Steward.

== Early life ==
Lee was born in Bow, London, England, to Irish Traveller parents. In 1998, his parents returned to Castleconnell, County Limerick in Ireland with their six children. Lee had previously been training at the Repton Boxing Club in Bethnal Green from the age of eight, and upon his family's return to Ireland, Lee and his brothers joined St Francis ABC in Limerick, where his boxing career took off.

Lee signed his first professional contract with Manny Steward in 2005. He then moved to Detroit, Michigan where he lived with his longtime manager and trainer until Steward died in 2012. Following his death, Lee moved back to London where he joined up with English trainer Adam Booth. It was with Booth that Lee won the WBO belt in 2014, becoming the first Irish boxer to win a world title on American soil since 1934.

== Amateur career ==
Lee represented Ireland at the 2002 World Junior championships in Santiago de Cuba, competing in the middleweight category. Lee fought five times in a week beating Ismail Sillakh and United States favourite Jesus Gonzales but lost the final to Cuban boxer Noelvis Diaz to claim the silver medal.

At the World Amateur Championships in Bangkok, Lee was beaten on points by eventual winner Gennady Golovkin.

Lee traveled to Pula, Croatia for the European Amateur Championships in February 2004. He earned a bronze medal in the competition, and thereby qualified for the 2004 Summer Olympics at just nineteen years of age.

In June 2004, Lee won silver at the EU Amateur Championships. He lost to the vastly experienced, former world champion, Marian Simion in the Middleweight final.

Lee's first fight of the 2004 Olympics was against Mexican boxer Alfredo Angulo, who Lee defeated 38:23 on points. In the second round, Lee faced Hassan N'Dam N'Jikam of Cameroon. After four rounds the fight was drawn 27:27 and the bout was decided by "count-back". The verdict went the way of the Cameroonian, which ended Lee's hopes of a medal. Lee was bitterly disappointed in the result and stated "I just didn’t fight to my ability. But when I got back home the people treated me like I’d won the gold medal."

In February 2003, aged seventeen, Lee fought for the Irish senior amateur title in the middleweight division. That year he beat Eamonn O'Kane. The following year, Lee won the title after overcoming Patrick Murray for the honour. In 2005 Lee retained the title, this time by defeating Eamonn O'Kane in the final.

== Professional career ==
After the Olympics, the Irish Sports Council had stated that they were prepared to fund Lee in order for him to continue at amateur level and compete at the Beijing Olympics. Lee however turned this offer down and signed a professional contract with trainer-manager Emanuel Steward, who had followed Lee's progress since the World Junior Championships. Lee subsequently emigrated to the United States where he trained at Steward's world-renowned Kronk Gym in Detroit. Lee made an immediate impression, with Steward recalling - "The first time he’d flown from Ireland to Chicago, then to Detroit, and he wanted to spar. I said ‘No, you must have jet lag.’ But he insisted, so I put him in with Cornelius Bundrage, who was then undefeated. Andy pulled a mouthpiece out of his pocket, borrowed boots from one guy and gloves from another, then he doggone whooped ‘K-9’s ass." His first professional bout was in March 2006, at the Joe Louis Arena, Detroit, in which Lee beat Anthony Cannon on a points decision over six rounds on a card that featured Johnathon Banks.

On 15 December 2007, Lee became the Irish Super-middleweight champion after he beat fellow Irishman Jason McKay at the National Stadium in Dublin.

"I’ve never had a fighter that I’ve rated higher. To be good is one thing but to be great takes a great passion for what you do and Andy loves to fight. He is the complete package – good looking, intelligent, explosive power, physically structured to be a great fighter. There are more Irish people spread out around the world than any other race and I honestly believe Andy could be the biggest draw in boxing history."

— Emanuel Steward speaking about Lee in 2008.

In April 2007, HBO featured Lee as one of boxing's top prospects, with Larry Merchant commenting - "he looks like 10 million dollars". Star coach Steward was also quick to praise Lee, claiming on RTÉ television that by the end of 2008 he would defeat the then current world champion, Kelly Pavlik.

In December 2007, ESPN also listed Lee as a top prospect saying - "Lee has all the potential to be the next great middleweight star. The 2004 Irish Olympian is a 6 foot 2 inch southpaw with skills, power and a streak as mean in the ring as he is personable outside of it. With trainer/manager Emanuel Steward molding him, Lee is moving quickly. He was 8-0 in 2007, including a thunderous knockout of faded former titleholder Carl Daniels. Lee is as blue chip as they come. If you could get stock in a prospect, he'd be near the top of the buy list."

On 21 March 2008, during his debut on ESPN 2, Lee suffered his first defeat after losing by TKO in the seventh round to Brian Vera. The stoppage was mildly controversial, as Lee was winning on points, and was still punching back as the referee Tony Chiarantano stepped in. However, he had been reeling and unsteady from heavy punishment and fatigue for several minutes, and neither he nor his corner complained at the stoppage.

On July 19, 2008, Willie Gibbs was defeated by Lee in the final round when Gibbs threw in the towel after a barrage of shots from Lee with 7 seconds remaining.

On 21 March 2009, appearing on the undercard of the Bernard Dunne world title fight against Ricardo Cordoba, Lee beat the tough German brawler Alexander Sipos in a unanimous decision. This was a reckoning of sorts, as it occurred on the one year-to-the-day anniversary of Lee's first and only professional defeat.

On 20 June 2009, Lee outpointed Olegs Fedotovs in front of 60,000+ at the Veltins Arena in Gelsenkirchen, Germany for his 18th victory as part of the Klitschko-Chagaev undercard.

On 22 August 2009, Lee stopped Andy Shuler in the 8th round of a bout in Hammond, Indiana to earn his 19th victory and 14th KO.

A hometown crowd turned out in Limerick, 14 November 2009, to watch Lee defeat Frenchman Affif Belghecham in a ten-round battle of the southpaws. Shannonsider Lee outpointed the Frenchman 99–92; Lee stopped Mamadou Thiam the following year in the same venue.

On 30 July 2010, Lee faced James Cook in Miami, Oklahoma and won the bout by a fifth-round knockout.

On 12 March 2011, Lee fought Craig McEwan at Foxwoods Resort Casino in Mashantucket, Connecticut, and won via technical knockout at 0:56 in the 10th round.

He avenged his loss to Brian Vera on 1 October 2011 by unanimous decision.

On 10 March 2012, Lee Knocked out Mexico's Saul Duran in the 2nd round of a stay busy fight.

=== Lee vs. Chavez: First World Title Shot ===
On 16 June 2012, Lee challenged undefeated Titleholder Julio Cesar Chavez Jr. for the WBC World Middleweight Title in the Sun Bowl Stadium in El Paso, Texas televised on HBO World Championship Boxing. Lee got off to a good start, using his jab and effectively outboxing Chavez Jr. in the center of the small 16 foot ring, however, Chavez Jr. eventually got through using his substantial weight advantage, and with his stronger physicality, essentially turning the fight in his favor. Near the middle rounds, Lee began to lose stamina due to Chavez Jr's focus on body work. In round 7, referee Laurence Cole stopped the bout with Lee still on his feet after Chavez Jr. stunned him. Lee subsequently took a barrage from Chavez Jr. on the ropes leading to the stoppage. Lee was up on all the official judges cards at the time.

=== Lee vs. Fitzgerald ===
Under the tutelage of new trainer Adam Booth, Lee returned to winning ways, after his loss to Chavez Jr., by outpointing former Irish super middleweight champion Anthony "The Pride" Fitzgerald (13–3, 4 KO's) over ten rounds in a middleweight fight held at the Odyssey Arena in Belfast on 9 February 2013 on the undercard of a Carl Frampton Vs Kiko Martinez EBU (European) super bantamweight title fight.

=== Lee vs. Jackson ===
On 7 June 2014, in Madison Square Garden, on the undercard of the Pay-Per-View fight between Miguel Cotto and Sergio Martinez, Andy Lee met hard-hitting Virgin Islander John Jackson in a 154-lb bout. John Jackson is the son of the great light-middleweight puncher Julian Jackson. In the first round Lee was knocked down for the first time in his amateur or pro career respectively on a hard right-hand counter by the heavy-handed Jackson. Lee regained his composure but proceeded to lose the next 3 rounds in a row, he spent the majority of the time tactically looking to catch Jackson coming in with a right hook counter. In round 5 Jackson unleashed a furious flurry of punches and trapped Lee on the ropes, Lee moved off the ropes, but as Jackson moved in to close the show, Andy Lee caught him with the perfectly timed right hook counter that he was looking for and knocked Jackson completely out.

=== Lee vs. Korobov: World Champion ===
After the comeback knockout victory over John Jackson, Andy Lee secured himself a 13 December WBO World Middleweight Title shot against the then undefeated former 2008 Russian Olympian, Matt Korobov, on the HBO triple-header that featured the fight between Timothy Bradley and Diego Chaves as its main event. In front of a sold-out crowd at the Cosmopolitan of Las Vegas, Lee and Korobov fought a closely contested chess match before Lee wobbled Korobov with a straight left in the 3rd round. However Korobov regained control and seemed to be controlling the pace of the fight until round 6, when Lee connected on a right hook in an exchange and badly hurt Korobov, a flurry of 18 straight unanswered punches forced referee Kenny Bayless to stop the contest handing Lee the 6th-round TKO victory and the WBO World Middleweight Title. With this most impressive win, Lee became the first Irishman from Ireland to win a world title on American soil since 1934.

=== Lee vs. Quillin ===
After stating that he wanted to fight the best in the world, Lee postponed a title defense in Ireland against Patrick Nielsen early reports say to defend his WBO Title against former WBO World Champion, unbeaten Peter Quillin in the Barclays Center on 11 April. Quillin failed to make weight at the weigh-in for the bout however, meaning regardless of the result of the fight, he was ineligible to win Lee's WBO Middleweight World Title. This fight took place as part of a Premier Boxing Champions show on NBC and was on a card that included Danny García fighting Lamont Peterson in the main event. The fight began with what appeared to be a fairly good first round for Lee until with 30 seconds left, Lee was dropped hard, and hurt by an overhand right delivered by Quillin. Lee survived the round, but two rounds later in round 3, found himself on the canvas again, albeit this time in controversial fashion, as it was discovered that Lee went down mostly due to Peter Quillin stepping on his foot. As the fight wore on the rounds seemed to be close and went back and forth, in the seventh round, Lee landed a hard left hand followed by a clean right hook to Quillin's chin which sent him sprawling to the canvas, evening the fight up on the cards and handing Peter Quillin the first knockdown of his career. The fight continued to go back-and-forth and by the end of the 12th round, official judges scores were 113–112 for Lee, 113–112 for Quillin, and 113–113 even, rendering the official outcome of the bout a split draw.

=== Lee vs. Saunders ===
It was announced that on 19 September 2015, Andy Lee would defend his WBO Middleweight title against unbeaten Billy Joe Saunders in his home city of Limerick, Ireland. However the bout was rescheduled for 19 December, and instead took place in the Manchester Arena. Due to a slow start by Lee, Saunders was able to score 2 knockdowns. However, once again, Lee came on strong in the second half of the fight, outboxing Saunders for stages. However, Lee's late rally was not enough to close the gap of the early lead Saunders gained. With scores of 115–111, 114–112, and one judge scoring it a draw at 113–113, Lee lost a close majority decision on the scorecards.

=== Lee vs. Leatherwood ===
In his last fight, Lee fought KeAndrae Leatherwood. In a largely uneventful fight, Lee managed to secure the win via unanimous decision, winning 80–72, 79–73 and 78–74 on the scorecards.

=== Retirement ===
On 20 February 2018, Andy Lee confirmed his retirement from boxing on Irish radio station Newstalk, on the Off The Ball sports programme, citing responsibilities as a father for why he had chosen to retire. He released an autobiography on 26 October 2018 titled 'Fighter' which detailed his upbringing and rise to being a world champion. Since retiring, Lee has become a trainer, manager and boxing pundit. At present, he trains Jason Quigley and was assistant-trainer to SugarHill Steward for Tyson Fury's rematch with Deontay Wilder on 22 February 2020, which Fury won by TKO. He also trained Joseph Parker for his fight with Derek Chisora in 2021. He trained Joseph Parker for his fight against Joe Joyce on 24 September 2022 in which Parker was stopped in the 11th round. Parker was losing on all judges cards.

== Professional boxing record ==
39 fights	35 wins	3 losses
By knockout	24	2
By decision	11	1
Draws	1	

No.	Result	Record	Opponent	Type	Round, time	Date	Location	Notes
39	Win	35–3–1	KeAndrae Leatherwood	UD	8	18 Mar 2017	Madison Square Garden, New York City, New York, US	
38	Loss	34–3–1	Billy Joe Saunders	MD	12	19 Dec 2015	Manchester Arena, Manchester, England	Lost WBO middleweight title
37	Draw	34–2–1	Peter Quillin	SD	12	11 Apr 2015	Barclays Center, New York City, New York, US	
36	Win	34–2	Matt Korobov	TKO	6 (12), 1:10	13 Dec 2014	Cosmopolitan of Las Vegas, Paradise, Nevada, US	Won vacant WBO middleweight title
35	Win	33–2	John Jackson	KO	5 (10), 1:07	7 Jun 2014	Madison Square Garden, New York City, New York, US	Won WBC-NABF super-welterweight title
34	Win	32–2	Frank Haroche-Horta	MD	8	12 Apr 2014	Blue Water Dokken, Esbjerg, Denmark	
33	Win	31–2	Ferenc Hefner	TKO	2 (6), 1:19	23 Nov 2013	Phones 4u Arena, Manchester, England	
32	Win	30–2	Darryl Cunningham	TKO	1 (10), 1:27	15 May 2013	B.B. King Blues Club & Grill, New York City, New York, US	
31	Win	29–2	Anthony Fitzgerald	PTS	10	9 Feb 2013	Odyssey Arena, Belfast, Northern Ireland	
30	Loss	28–2	Julio César Chávez Jr.	TKO	7 (12), 2:21	16 Jun 2012	Sun Bowl, El Paso, Texas, US	For WBC middleweight title
29	Win	28–1	Saul Duran	KO	2 (10), 0:54	10 Mar 2012	Suburban Collection Showplace, Novi, Michigan, US	
28	Win	27–1	Brian Vera	UD	10	1 Oct 2011	Boardwalk Hall, Atlantic City, New Jersey, US	
27	Win	26–1	Alex Bunema	UD	10	18 May 2011	Donald E. Stephens Convention Center, Rosemont, Illinois, US	Won vacant WBC-NABF, and WBA-NABA middleweight titles
26	Win	25–1	Craig McEwan	TKO	10 (10), 0:56	12 Mar 2011	MGM Grand at Foxwoods, Ledyard, Connecticut, US	
25	Win	24–1	Troy Lowry	TKO	4 (10), 2:59	2 Oct 2010	Horseshoe Casino, Hammond, Indiana, US	
24	Win	23–1	Michael Walker	TKO	8 (10), 2:03	17 Sep 2010	UIC Pavilion, Chicago, Illinois, US	
23	Win	22–1	James Cook	KO	5 (8), 2:42	30 Jul 2010	Buffalo Run Casino, Miami, Oklahoma, US	
22	Win	21–1	Mamadou Thiam	RTD	2 (10), 3:00	15 May 2010	University Arena, Limerick, Ireland	
21	Win	20–1	Affif Belghecham	PTS	10	14 Nov 2009	University Arena, Limerick, Ireland	
20	Win	19–1	Anthony Shuler	TKO	8 (10), 2:05	21 Aug 2009	Horseshoe Casino, Hammond, Indiana, US	
19	Win	18–1	Olegs Fedotovs	UD	6	20 Jun 2009	Veltins-Arena, Gelsenkirchen, Germany	
18	Win	17–1	Alexander Sipos	PTS	10	21 Mar 2009	The O2, Dublin, Ireland	
17	Win	16–1	Willie Gibbs	TKO	10 (10), 2:46	19 Jul 2008	University Arena, Limerick, Ireland	
16	Loss	15–1	Brian Vera	TKO	7 (10), 2:17	21 Mar 2008	Mohegan Sun Arena, Montville, Connecticut, US	
15	Win	15–0	Alejandro G. Falliga	KO	5 (10), 1:49	2 Feb 2008	University Arena, Limerick, Ireland	
14	Win	14–0	Jason McKay	RTD	6 (10), 3:00	15 Dec 2007	National Stadium, Dublin, Ireland	Won vacant Irish super-middleweight title
13	Win	13–0	Marcus Thomas	KO	1 (10), 1:13	15 Nov 2007	Compuware Arena, Plymouth, Michigan, US	
12	Win	12–0	James Morrow	TKO	1 (8), 2:43	2 Oct 2007	Bourbon Street, Merrionette Park, Illinois, US	
11	Win	11–0	Ciaran Healy	RTD	4 (8), 3:00	25 Aug 2007	Point Theatre, Dublin, Ireland	
10	Win	10–0	Thomas Hengstberger	KO	2 (8), 1:22	7 Jul 2007	Kölnarena, Cologne, Germany	
9	Win	9–0	Clinton Bonds	TKO	1 (8), 2:09	18 May 2007	The New Daisy Theatre, Memphis, Tennessee, US	
8	Win	8–0	Carl Daniels	KO	3 (8), 2:36	16 Mar 2007	Madison Square Garden, New York City, New York, US	
7	Win	7–0	Arturo Ortega	TKO	6 (6), 0:32	25 Jan 2007	The Orleans, Paradise, Nevada, US	
6	Win	6–0	Dennis Sharpe	UD	6	11 Nov 2006	Madison Square Garden, New York City, New York, US	
5	Win	5–0	Jess Salway	KO	1 (4), 1:34	14 Sep 2006	The Orleans, Paradise, Nevada, US	
4	Win	4–0	Carl Cockerham	UD	6	10 Aug 2006	The Orleans, Paradise, Nevada, US	
3	Win	3–0	Rodney Freeman	TKO	1 (6), 1:38	15 Jun 2006	Pepsi Pavilion, Memphis, Tennessee, US	
2	Win	2–0	Wassim Khalil	TKO	5 (6), 2:51	22 Apr 2006	SAP Arena, Mannheim, Germany	
1	Win	1–0	Anthony Cannon	UD	6	10 Mar 2006	Joe Louis Arena, Detroit, Michigan, US	

Sporting positions
Regional boxing titles
Vacant Title last held by Jim Rock	Irish super-middleweight champion 15 December 2007 – February 2010; Vacated	Vacant Title next held by Anthony Fitzgerald
Vacant Title last held by Fernando Guerrero	WBC-NABF middleweight champion 18 May 2011 – November 2011; Vacated	Vacant Title next held by Jose Miguel Torres
Vacant Title last held by Kassim Ouma	WBA-NABA middleweight champion 18 May 2011 – June 2012; Vacated	Vacant Title next held by Willie Monroe Jr.
Vacant Title last held by Willie Nelson	WBC-NABF super-welterweight champion 7 June 2014 – December 2014; Vacated	Vacant Title next held by Ramón Álvarez
World boxing titles
Vacant Title last held by Peter Quillin	WBO middleweight champion 13 December 2014 – 19 December 2015	Succeeded by Billy Joe Saunders
