= J'Leon Love =

American boxer (born 1987)

Personal information
- Born: J'Leon Love; September 25, 1987 (age 39) Inkster, Michigan, U.S.
- Height: 5 ft 10 in (1.78 m)
- Weight: Super middleweight

Boxing career
- Stance: Orthodox

Boxing record
- Total fights: 30
- Wins: 25
- Win by KO: 13
- Losses: 3
- Draws: 1
- No contests: 1

J'Leon Love (/ˈdʒeɪliɒn/ JAY-li-on; born September 25, 1987) is an American professional boxer.

== Amateur career ==
After his father turned him onto boxing, Love had an amateur career record of 115-5. His opponents have included Shawn Porter, Dennis Douglin.

- Amateur Record:
  - 2006-2009 Detroit Golden Gloves Champion
  - 2006-2008 US. Michigan State Champion
  - 2007 National Ringside World Champion
  - 2007 National Golden Gloves Silver Medalist
  - 2007 National PAL Silver Medalist
  - 2008 Olympic Training Partner

== Professional career ==
On January 29, 2010, Love made his professional debut by knocking out Vince Burkhalter in the first round of a four-round middleweight bout. Love knocked Burkhalter down twice before the referee reached the count of 10 at 1:33.

On September 8, 2012, Love fought Ramon Valenzuela in the opening bout of Showtime Championship Boxing. Love won by disqualification in the eighth round.

On May 4, 2013, Love fought Gabriel Rosado on the undercard of Floyd Mayweather Jr. vs. Robert Guerrero. Prior to the fight, Love came two hours late to the weigh-in, and at the weigh-in he was 1.5 lbs over the weight limit. He took an extra hour to make the weight and was fined $100 as a result. The fight was very close, and although Love won by split decision, the majority of viewers thought that Rosado actually won the fight. The judges' score cards read 95-94 97-92 for Love and 95-94 for Rosado.

After the fight, Love tested positive for hydrochlorothiazide, a diuretic used by athletes to cut weight. The drug is banned by the Nevada State Athletic Commission. Because of the failed drug test, the decision was overturned from a split decision win for Love to a no contest.

On August 4, 2018, Love lost to former WBO champion Peter Quillin. Love was mainly on the defensive side throughout the fight, Quillin being the one to push the pace and attack. The judges ended up scoring the fight 98-92 twice and 99-91 once to reward Quilling the unanimous-decision victory.

In his next fight, Love faced another former champion in David Benavidez. Both fighters had their moments in the opening round. In the second round, Benavidez was the one coming forward. Halfway through the round Benavidez caught Love with a big right hand, following it up with a flurry of punches that forced the referee to stop the fight.

== Personal life ==
Love is Muslim. He is also vegan.

He is the assistant coach of Jake Paul.

== Professional boxing record ==
30 fights	25 wins	3 losses
By knockout	13	2
By decision	11	1
By disqualification	1	0
Draws	1	
No contests	1	

No.	Result	Record	Opponent	Type	Round, time	Date	Location	Notes
30	Win	25–3–1 (1)	Marcus Oliveira	UD	8	Dec 18, 2021	Amalie Arena, Tampa, Florida, US	
29	Loss	24–3–1 (1)	David Benavidez	TKO	2 (10), 1:14	Mar 16, 2019	AT&T Stadium, Arlington, Texas, US	
28	Loss	24–2–1 (1)	Peter Quillin	UD	10	Aug 4, 2018	Nassau Veterans Memorial Coliseum, New York City, New York, US	
27	Win	24–1–1 (1)	Jaime Barboza	UD	10	May 26, 2018	Beau Rivage Resort & Casino, Biloxi, Mississippi, US	
26	Draw	23–1–1 (1)	Abraham Han	TD	8 (10), 1:02	Sep 8, 2017	Hard Rock Hotel & Casino, Las Vegas, Nevada, US	Han unable to continue after accidental headbutt
25	Win	23–1 (1)	Dashon Johnson	TKO	6 (10), 0:53	Sep 16, 2016	The Cosmopolitan of Las Vegas, Paradise, Nevada, US	
24	Win	22–1 (1)	Michael Gbenga	RTD	4 (10), 3:00	Apr 1, 2016	D.C. Armory, Washington D.C., US	
23	Win	21–1 (1)	Marcus Upshaw	UD	10	Sep 29, 2015	Palms Casino Resort, Paradise, Nevada, US	
22	Win	20–1 (1)	Jason Escalera	TKO	7 (10), 2:08	Jun 21, 2015	Bally's Las Vegas, Las Vegas, Nevada, US	
21	Win	19–1 (1)	Scott Sigmon	UD	8	Mar 28, 2015	Palms Casino Resort, Paradise, Nevada, US	
20	Loss	18–1 (1)	Rogelio Medina	KO	3 (10), 0:39	Aug 30, 2014	Palms Casino Resort, Paradise, Nevada, US	
19	Win	18–0 (1)	Marco Antonio Peribán	UD	10	May 3, 2014	MGM Grand Hotel & Casino, Paradise, Nevada, US	
18	Win	17–0 (1)	Vladine Biosse	TKO	10 (10), 0:45	Feb 28, 2014	Turning Stone Resort & Casino, Verona, New York, US	
17	Win	16–0 (1)	Lajuan Simon	KO	6 (10), 2:48	Dec 6, 2013	Little Creek Casino Resort, Shelton, Washington, US	
16	NC	15–0 (1)	Gabriel Rosado	NC	10	May 4, 2013	MGM Grand Hotel & Casino, Las Vegas, Nevada, US	J'leon Love tested positive for Hydrochlorothiazide
15	Win	15–0	Derrick Findley	UD	10	Feb 23, 2013	Detroit Masonic Temple, Detroit, Michigan, US	
14	Win	14–0	Tyrone Selders	TKO	6 (8), 2:39	Nov 3, 2012	Humble Civic Center & Arena Complex, Humble, Texas, US	
13	Win	13–0	Ramon Valenzuela, Jr.	DQ	8 (10), 0:37	Sep 8, 2012	Hard Rock Hotel & Casino, Paradise, Nevada, US	
12	Win	12–0	Joseph de los Santos	UD	8	Jul 14, 2012	Mandalay Bay Resort & Casino, Paradise, Nevada, US	
11	Win	11–0	Ibahiem King	KO	3 (8), 0:38	Apr 20, 2012	Beau Rivage Resort & Casino, Biloxi, Mississippi, US	
10	Win	10–0	Elie Augustama	UD	6	Jan 6, 2012	Mallory Square, Key West, Florida, US	
9	Win	9–0	Eddie Hunter	UD	6	Oct 1, 2011	Boardwalk Hall, Atlantic City, New Jersey, US	
8	Win	8–0	Guy Packer	KO	1 (4), 2:29	Jul 2, 2011	Atwood Stadium, Flint, Michigan, US	
7	Win	7–0	Lamar Harris	UD	4	Jun 4, 2011	Boardwalk Hall, Atlantic City, New Jersey, US	
6	Win	6–0	JC Peterson	TKO	2 (4), 2:13	Apr 16, 2011	Foxwoods Resort Casino, Mashantucket, Connecticut, US	
5	Win	5–0	Fernando Calleros	UD	4	May 22, 2010	Mohegan Sun, Uncasville, Connecticut, US	
4	Win	4–0	Jeremy Marts	TKO	1 (4), 1:29	May 1, 2010	Johnson County Fairgrounds, Iowa City, Iowa, US	
3	Win	3–0	Bryan Smith	KO	2 (4), 2:29	Mar 25, 2010	Commerce Casino, Commerce, California, US	
2	Win	2–0	Rufus Defibaugh	TKO	1 (4), 0:47	Feb 27, 2010	James Brown Arena, Augusta, Georgia, US	
1	Win	1–0	Vince Burkhalter	KO	1 (4), 1:33	Jan 29, 2010	Mohegan Sun, Uncasville, Connecticut, US	

== Modeling ==
Love also has a profession in modeling. He has had the opportunity to model with English supermodel Kate Moss in early 2007.
