= Craig McEwan =

Craig McEwan may refer to:

- Craig McEwan (footballer) (born 1977), Scottish footballer
- Craig McEwan (boxer) (born 1982), Scottish boxer
