= Abraham Han =

American boxer (born 1984)

Personal information
- Nickname: Abie
- Nationality: American
- Born: September 29, 1984 (age 42) El Paso, Texas
- Height: 6 ft 0 in (183 cm)
- Weight: Light middleweight

Boxing career
- Reach: 72 in (183 cm)
- Stance: Orthodox

Boxing record
- Total fights: 31
- Wins: 26
- Win by KO: 16
- Losses: 4
- Draws: 1
- No contests: 0

Abraham Han (born September 29, 1984) is an American professional boxer. He also fought in the World Combat League.

== Personal life ==
Han's siblings are all professional or amateur boxers.

== Professional career ==
On January 22, 2011, Han beat veteran Orphius Waite by TKO in the second round. This bout was held at the Texas Station in North Las Vegas, Nevada.

On April 5, 2014, Han defeated former world title contender Juan Carlos Candelo via second-round TKO. By defeating Candelo, he was awarded the Universal Boxing Federation Inter-Continental middleweight title.

On September 8, 2017, Han fought J'Leon Love to a technical majority draw. The fight was stopped in the eight round after a clash of heads left Han unable to continue.

== Professional boxing record ==
31 fights	26 wins	4 losses
By knockout	16	1
By decision	10	3
Draws	1	

No.	Result	Record	Opponent	Type	Round, time	Date	Location	Notes
31	Loss	26–4–1	Anthony Dirrell	UD	10	Apr 28, 2018	Don Haskins Center, El Paso, Texas, U.S.	
30	Draw	26–3–1	J'Leon Love	TD	8 (10), 1:02	Sep 8, 2017	Hard Rock Hotel and Casino, Paradise, Nevada, U.S.	Majority TD: Han cut from an accidental headbutt
29	Win	26–3	Martín Rodríguez	TKO	1 (10), 1:14	Mar 3, 2017	Gimnasio Municipal, Nuevo Casas Grandes, Mexico	
28	Win	25–3	Freddy López Mejia	KO	2 (8), 2:25	Aug 29, 2015	Dream Arena, El Paso, Texas, U.S.	
27	Win	24–3	José Flores	UD	8	Jul 3, 2015	Dream Arena, El Paso, Texas, U.S.	
26	Loss	23–3	Fernando Guerrero	SD	10	Apr 18, 2015	StubHub Center, Carson, California, U.S.	
25	Loss	23–2	Sergio Mora	SD	12	Feb 6, 2015	Beau Rivage Resort and Casino, Biloxi, Mississippi, U.S.	For vacant IBF-USBA middleweight title
24	Win	23–1	Marcos Reyes	MD	10	Oct 18, 2014	StubHub Center, Carson, California, U.S.	
23	Win	22–1	Juan Carlos Candelo	TKO	2 (10), 2:17	Apr 5, 2014	County Coliseum, El Paso, Texas, U.S.	Won vacant UBF Inter-Continental middleweight title
22	Win	21–1	Daniel Gonzalez	UD	6	Jan 31, 2014	County Coliseum, El Paso, Texas, U.S.	
21	Win	20–1	Bernardo Guereca	TKO	3 (8), 0:10	Oct 5, 2013	Socorro Entertainment Center, Socorro, Texas, U.S.	
20	Loss	19–1	Glen Tapia	RTD	8 (10), 3:00	Jul 12, 2013	Texas Station Casino, North Las Vegas, U.S.	For vacant WBO-NABO super welterweight title
19	Win	19–0	Brandon Baue	UD	8	Mar 16, 2013	WinStar Casino, Thackerville, Oklahoma, U.S.	
18	Win	18–0	Rosario Terrazas Robles	KO	1 (8), 2:12	Oct 27, 2012	County Coliseum, El Paso, Texas, U.S.	
17	Win	17–0	Joe Gomez	TKO	4 (8), 1:39	Jun 16, 2012	Sun Bowl, El Paso, Texas, U.S.	
16	Win	16–0	Rahman Mustafa Yusubov	UD	6	Mar 23, 2012	Casino del Sol, Tucson, Arizona, U.S.	
15	Win	15–0	Eloy Suárez	PTS	6	Oct 29, 2011	WinStar Casino, Thackerville, Oklahoma, U.S.	
14	Win	14–0	Justin Williams	UD	6	Jul 30, 2011	Softball Country Arena, Denver, Colorado, U.S.	
13	Win	13–0	Taronze Washington	UD	6	May 6, 2011	Mandalay Bay, Paradise, Nevada, U.S.	
12	Win	12–0	Orphius Waite	TKO	2 (6), 2:14	Jan 22, 2011	Texas Station Casino, North Las Vegas, Nevada, U.S.	
11	Win	11–0	Hilario Lopez	UD	6	Sep 24, 2010	County Coliseum, El Paso, Texas, U.S.	
10	Win	10–0	Jose Adelaydo Gonzalez	TKO	2 (8), 2:22	May 6, 2010	Anatole Hotel, Dallas, Texas, U.S.	
9	Win	9–0	Jorge Hernández	KO	1 (6), 1:00	Mar 27, 2010	Arena Monterrey, Monterrey, Mexico	
8	Win	8–0	Adams Morgan	KO	1 (4), 2:39	Dec 16, 2009	Shooters, Texarkana, Arkansas, U.S.	
7	Win	7–0	Alfonso González	KO	3 (4), 2:49	Sep 12, 2009	Arena Monterrey, Monterrey, Mexico	
6	Win	6–0	Sergio Santana	RTD	2 (4), 3:00	Jul 31, 2009	Pan American Center, Las Cruces, New Mexico, U.S.	
5	Win	5–0	Brian Soto	KO	2 (6), 2:20	Jul 24, 2009	Don Haskins Center, El Paso, Texas, U.S.	
4	Win	4–0	Ibahiem King	UD	6	May 21, 2009	Hard Rock Hotel, San Diego, California, U.S.	
3	Win	3–0	Hiram Elier Lleverino	TKO	1 (4), 2:18	Mar 14, 2009	Auditorio Centenario, Torreón, Mexico	
2	Win	2–0	Chris Shelton	KO	1 (4), 1:15	Sep 12, 2008	Comanche Nation Casino, Lawton, Oklahoma, U.S.	
1	Win	1–0	Sergio Lara	TKO	1 (4), 2:43	Dec 21, 2007	Dickerson's Event Center, Las Cruces, New Mexico, U.S.	
