= Dashon Johnson =

American professional boxer and mixed martial artist (born 1988)

Personal information
- Nickname: Fly Boy
- Born: January 25, 1988 (age 38) Escondido, California, U.S.
- Height: 5 ft 9 in (175 cm)
- Weight: Super middleweight

Boxing career
- Stance: Orthodox

Boxing record
- Total fights: 50
- Wins: 22
- Win by KO: 7
- Losses: 24
- Draws: 3
- No contests: 1

Dashon Johnson (born January 25, 1988) is an American professional boxer, mixed martial artist, and former North American Boxing Association (NABA) title super middleweight champion.

Johnson is from Fontana, California.

== Boxing career ==
=== NABA title ===
In 2015, he defeated Mike Gavronski to win the NABA title. He successfully defended the title against Izaak Cardona, winning by split decision.

=== Other regional title attempts ===
Johnson lost to Jesse Hart for the North American Boxing Organization and United States Boxing Association super middleweight titles.

=== Other notable opponents ===
Johnson has competed against many notable opponents in non-title fights, but most ended in a loss. He has lost to Peter Quillin, J'Leon Love, Sergio Mora, Dominic Wade, Joshua Clottey, Jermell Charlo, and Glen Tapia, while defeating Craig McEwan.

=== Sparring ===
Johnson has been a boxing sparring partner of Conor McGregor and Manny Pacquiao.

== Mixed martial arts career ==
Johnson has also fought twice in the UFC, losing both bouts before his contract was cut by the organisation.
