= Ramon Valenzuela Jr. =

American boxer

Ramon Valenuela Jr.
Personal information
- Nationality: American
- Born: October 22, 1990 (age 35) Chicago, Illinois

Boxing career

Ramon Valenuela Jr. (born October 22, 1990) is an American professional boxer in the middleweight division. Ramon is nicknamed 'El Dragon' due to his love of Dragon Ball Z and won his first seven professional fights.

On September 8, 2012 Ramon fought J'Leon Love on the opening bout of Showtime Championship Boxing where Ramon was disqualified in the eighth round. This fight was elevated to Showtime Championship Boxing after the fight between welterweight titlest Randall Bailey and Devon Alexander was postponed.
