= Peter Quillin =

American boxer

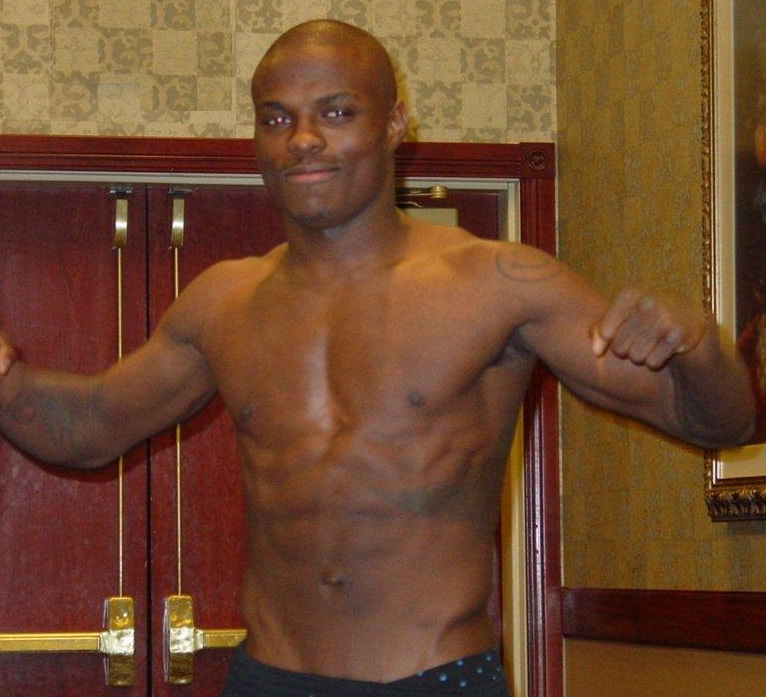
- Quillin in 2011

Personal information
- Nickname: Kid Chocolate
- Nationality: American
- Born: June 22, 1983 (age 43) Chicago, Illinois, U.S.
- Height: 5 ft 11 in (180 cm)
- Weight: Middleweight; Super middleweight

Boxing career
- Reach: 72 1/2 in (184 cm)
- Stance: Orthodox

Boxing record
- Total fights: 38
- Wins: 34
- Win by KO: 23
- Losses: 2
- Draws: 1
- No contests: 1

Peter Quillin (born June 22, 1983) is an American professional boxer who held the WBO middleweight title from 2012 to 2014. He also challenged once for the WBA (Regular) middleweight title in 2015.

== Early life ==
Peter Quillin was born in 1983 in Chicago, Illinois but was raised in Grand Rapids, Michigan. Quillin lived 2 doors down from Floyd Mayweather while growing up in Grand Rapids. He is a Christian. During his amateur boxing career, he had 15 fights, and soon after, the tall, aggressive fighter turned pro in New York. He said about his early life "Homelessness, a rotten childhood, no love in my household growing up, drugs, sexual assault, with all these things I experienced in life. No one can say my life isn’t a miracle." Despite numerous reports that he in fact came from an affluent nuclear family.

== Professional career ==
Quillin turned professional on June 9, 2005, after signing with promoter Cedric Kushner. In April 2008, Quillin dominated former contender Antwun Echols. On June 11, 2008, Peter defeated Dionisio Miranda by unanimous decision at the Hard Rock Cafe in New York City. Quillin won most of the early rounds of the fight and was cruising Miranda in the seventh round. Peter would recover well in the eighth round, after being caught by Dionisio. Then Quillin fought the last two rounds of the fight effectively, with the final judges’ scores being 97-92, 97-92, and 97-93.

In April 2010, Peter moved from New York City to Los Angeles to train with the 4-time trainer of the year Freddie Roach.

On April 29, 2011, Quillin stopped title contender Jesse Brinkley to win the vacant United States Boxing Organisation Super Middleweight Championship in Reno, Nevada.

On July 23, 2011, Quillin defeated late substitute Jason LeHoullier in Las Vegas. Although there were no knockdowns, LeHoullier was outclassed.

On November 5, 2011, Quillin made his HBO debut, stopping Craig McEwan in the 6th round in Cancún, Mexico. Then in June 2012 he fought Winky Wright, winning by unanimous decision and making Wright retire.

On September 4, 2014, Quillin vacated his WBO 160-pound title instead of facing the mandatory challenger Matvey Korobov for a purse that would have been over three times greater than any previous purse Quillin had received in his career.

On April 11, 2015, Quillin returned to the ring to fight Andy Lee at the Barclays Center in Brooklyn, New York in his Premier Boxing Champions debut, live on NBC. Due to not making weight at the weigh-in, however, Quillin was ineligible to win Lee's WBO World Middleweight Title. In the first round, Quillin dropped Lee hard with an overhand right near the end of round one and scored a questionable knockdown in round 3 when he stood on Lee's foot and tripped him. In round 7 however, Quillin tasted the canvas for the first time himself on a Lee right hook. For the rest of the fight Lee boxed consistently as Quillin's work rate and accuracy dropped. By the end of the 12th round, the fight was scored 113-112 for Lee, 113-112 for Quillin, and 113-113, making the official result of the fight a split draw.

=== Quillin vs. Jacobs ===
On December 5, 2015, Quillin suffered the 1st defeat of his career suffering a vicious TKO loss to Daniel Jacobs in the 1st round.

=== Quillin vs. Johnson ===
On September 8, 2017, Quillin made his return to the ring winning a competitive fight with Dashon Johnson.

=== Quillin vs. Love ===
In his next fight, Quillin fought J'Leon Love, who was ranked #6 by the IBF and #9 by the WBC at super middleweight. Quillin won the fight convincingly on the scorecards, 99-91, 98-92 and 98-92.

=== Quillin vs. Truax ===
In his following fight, Quilling fought WBC #3 and IBF #5 at super middleweight, Caleb Truax. The fight ended in a no contest in the second round due to an accidental head clash.

=== Quillin vs. Angulo ===
On September 21, 2019, Quillin fought Alfredo Angulo. Despite being the favorite, Quillin got outboxed by Angulo. Although Angulo was slow and did not really hurt Quillin much during the fight, Quillin also was not able to do much damage to Angulo. Two of the judges saw Angulo as the winner, scoring it 97-93 and 96-94 for him, while the third judge saw Quillin as the winner, scoring the fight 96-94 for Quillin.

== Professional boxing record ==
38 fights	34 wins	2 losses
By knockout	23	1
By decision	11	1
Draws	1	
No contests	1	

No.	Result	Record	Opponent	Type	Round, time	Date	Location	Notes
38	Loss	34–2–1 (1)	Alfredo Angulo	SD	10	Sep 21, 2019	Rabobank Theater, Bakersfield, California, U.S.	
37	NC	34–1–1 (1)	Caleb Truax	NC	2 (12), 3:00	Apr 13, 2019	Minneapolis Armory, Minneapolis, Minnesota, U.S.	Fight stopped due to an accidental head clash
36	Win	34–1–1	J'Leon Love	UD	10	Aug 4, 2018	Nassau Coliseum, Uniondale, New York, U.S.	
35	Win	33–1–1	Dashon Johnson	UD	8	Sep 8, 2017	The Joint, Paradise, Nevada, U.S.	
34	Loss	32–1–1	Daniel Jacobs	TKO	1 (12), 1:25	Dec 5, 2015	Barclays Center, New York City, New York, U.S.	For WBA (Regular) middleweight title
33	Win	32–0–1	Michael Zerafa	KO	5 (12), 1:06	Sep 12, 2015	Foxwoods Resort Casino, Ledyard, Connecticut, U.S.	
32	Draw	31–0–1	Andy Lee	SD	12	Apr 11, 2015	Barclays Center, New York City, New York, U.S.	
31	Win	31–0	Lukáš Konečný	UD	12	Apr 19, 2014	D.C. Armory, Washington, D.C., U.S.	Retained WBO middleweight title
30	Win	30–0	Gabriel Rosado	TKO	10 (12), 0:40	Oct 26, 2013	Boardwalk Hall, Atlantic City, New Jersey, U.S.	Retained WBO middleweight title
29	Win	29–0	Fernando Guerrero	TKO	7 (12), 1:38	Apr 27, 2013	Barclays Center, New York City, New York, U.S.	Retained WBO middleweight title
28	Win	28–0	Hassan N'Dam N'Jikam	UD	12	Oct 20, 2012	Barclays Center, New York City, New York, U.S.	Won WBO middleweight title
27	Win	27–0	Winky Wright	UD	10	Jun 2, 2012	Home Depot Center, Carson, California, U.S.	
26	Win	26–0	Craig McEwan	TKO	6 (10), 2:23	Nov 5, 2011	Centro de Cancún, Cancún, Mexico	
25	Win	25–0	Jason LeHoullier	TKO	5 (10), 1:38	Jul 23, 2011	Mandalay Bay Events Center, Paradise, Nevada, U.S.	
24	Win	24–0	Jesse Brinkley	TKO	3 (10), 2:34	Apr 29, 2011	Events Center, Reno, Nevada, U.S.	Won vacant USBO super middleweight title
23	Win	23–0	Dennis Sharpe	TKO	4 (8), 1:54	Feb 11, 2011	Sports Center, Fairfield, California, U.S.	
22	Win	22–0	Martin Desjardins	KO	1 (10), 2:53	Dec 18, 2010	Colisée Pepsi, Quebec City, Quebec, Canada	
21	Win	21–0	Fernando Zuniga	UD	10	Feb 6, 2010	Prudential Center, Newark, New Jersey, U.S.	
20	Win	20–0	Sam Hill	TKO	10 (10), 1:50	Sep 17, 2008	Verizon Wireless Arena, Manchester, New Hampshire, U.S.	
19	Win	19–0	Dionisio Miranda	UD	10	Jun 11, 2008	Hard Rock Cafe, New York City, New York, U.S.	
18	Win	18–0	Antwun Echols	UD	10	Apr 16, 2008	Hammerstein Ballroom, New York City, New York, U.S.	
17	Win	17–0	Thomas Brown	KO	2 (6), 0:32	Feb 23, 2008	Madison Square Garden, New York City, New York, U.S.	
16	Win	16–0	Troy Lowry	TKO	2 (8), 0:32	Dec 13, 2007	Roseland Ballroom, New York City, New York, U.S.	
15	Win	15–0	Jesse Orta	UD	6	Sep 5, 2007	Cipriani Wall Street, New York City, New York, U.S.	
14	Win	14–0	Jose Humberto Corral	KO	1 (8), 1:38	Aug 18, 2007	South Towne Expo Center, Sandy, Utah, U.S.	
13	Win	13–0	Jamaal Davis	UD	8	Jun 9, 2007	Madison Square Garden, New York City, New York, U.S.	
12	Win	12–0	Victor Paz	TKO	2 (6), 0:58	May 18, 2007	Beacon Theatre, New York City, New York, U.S.	
11	Win	11–0	Alexander Pacheco Quiroz	TKO	1 (6), 2:18	Apr 26, 2007	Hammerstein Ballroom, New York City, New York, U.S.	
10	Win	10–0	Nathan Martin	TKO	2 (6), 0:39	Mar 10, 2007	Madison Square Garden, New York City, New York, U.S.	
9	Win	9–0	Steve Walker	TKO	1 (6), 0:38	Feb 22, 2007	Roseland Ballroom, New York City, New York, U.S.	
8	Win	8–0	David Estrada	TKO	1 (6), 2:56	Nov 3, 2006	Roseland Ballroom, New York City, New York, U.S.	
7	Win	7–0	Brad Austin	TKO	2 (6), 2:05	Sep 20, 2006	Hammerstein Ballroom, New York City, New York, U.S.	
6	Win	6–0	William Prieto	KO	1 (4), 1:06	Jul 26, 2006	Hammerstein Ballroom, New York City, New York, U.S.	
5	Win	5–0	Eddie O'Neal	KO	1 (4), 1:33	Jun 10, 2006	Madison Square Garden, New York City, New York, U.S.	
4	Win	4–0	Tomas Padron	UD	4	Apr 20, 2006	Grand Ballroom, New York City, New York, U.S.	
3	Win	3–0	Willie Cruz	TKO	2 (4), 0:49	Mar 16, 2006	Madison Square Garden, New York City, New York, U.S.	
2	Win	2–0	Antwuan Hedgemond	TKO	1 (4), 1:57	Aug 4, 2005	Grand Ballroom, New York City, New York, U.S.	
1	Win	1–0	Anthony Hunter	TKO	1 (4)	Jun 9, 2005	Grand Ballroom, New York City, New York, U.S.	

Sporting positions
Regional boxing titles
Inaugural champion	USBO super middleweight champion April 29, 2011 – May 2012; Vacated	Vacant Title next held by Dion Savage
World boxing titles
Preceded by Hassan N'Dam N'Jikam	WBO middleweight champion October 20, 2012 – September 4, 2014; Vacated	Vacant Title next held by Andy Lee
