= Moonshine Hill, Texas =

Human settlement in Texas, United States

Coordinates: 30°0′11″N 95°14′11″W

Moonshine Hill is an area in Houston, Texas, United States that was once a distinct Harris County community located on the Humble oilfield.

Moonshine Hill began as a result of an oil boom and was located 2 miles east of Humble in northeastern Harris County off of FM 1960. Gas seepage were first noticed in 1887 by James Slaughter, who, in cooperation with S.A. Hart, unsuccessfully drilled for the commodity. In 1903 the Houstonian Charles F. Barrett took a lease at Moonshine Hill which is now part of Farm to Market Road 1960. In 1904 oil was discovered, and led to the town's growth, and equally, after a total of 3 oil booms and no more prospects, led to its demise.

However, at one point, Moonshine Hill's population was bigger than neighboring Humble, culminating at approximately 10,000 people. In its heyday at the beginning of the twentieth century, Moonshine Hill had 6 to 8 saloons, 3 grocery stores, a dance hall, a meat market, a drugstore, a school, and a union church.

"During World War I elements of the 19th Inf from Fort Sam Houston were stationed at Moonshine Hill. A reminder of WWI exists today in the name of Belleau Woods Drive." This is a reference to the Battle of Belleau Wood in 1918 during World War I, in which a wooded area on the Metz-Paris road, known as the "Bois de Belleau" i.e. Belleau Woods was recaptured by American forces from the Germans.

More damage was done to the town of Moonshine Hill and other areas surrounding the San Jacinto River in the Flood of October 1994. According to the Houston Chronicle, the larger Houston area suffered over 15,000 damaged homes, over 3,000 destroyed homes and 22 deaths. 29 inches of rain fell over the course of 3 days in Harris County. Many homes along the river were simply washed away, while others were later scrapped due to the amount of water and mold damage.

== Education ==
Residents are zoned to schools in the Humble Independent School District.

- Humble Elementary School
- Ross Sterling Middle School
- Humble High School
