= John Jackson (Virgin Islands boxer) =

Virgin Islands boxer (born 1989)

Personal information
- Nickname: Dah Rock
- Born: John Jackson; January 16, 1989 (age 37) Saint Thomas, U.S. Virgin Islands
- Height: 6 ft 0 in (183 cm)
- Weight: Light Middleweight; Middleweight

Boxing career
- Reach: 75 in (191 cm)

Boxing record
- Total fights: 25
- Wins: 21
- Win by KO: 16
- Losses: 4
- Draws: 0

John Jackson (born January 16, 1989) is a former professional boxer from the Virgin Islands, who competed in the 2008 Summer Olympics at welterweight. He challenged once for the WBC super welterweight title in 2016.

In 2022, Jackson was convicted of raping a 15-year old girl and producing child pornography.

== Family ==
John Jackson is the brother of light-heavyweight boxer Julius Jackson and the son of boxer Julian Jackson.

== Career ==
At the PanAm Games in 2007, Jackson's first bout was against favorite Demetrius Andrade; Jackson was beaten in 5:23. At the 2007 World Championships he again lost in the first round, this time to Aliasker Bashirov. However, in the 2008 Olympic qualifiers, Jackson defeated Argentina's Diego Gabriel Chaves and Brazil's Pedro Lima, but lost to Carlos Banteaux of Cuba. These results qualified Jackson to compete in the 2008 Summer Olympics, where he scored a 4:2 upset victory over Magomed Nurutdinov before losing 0:10 to Kim Jung-Joo.

In 2009, Jackson moved into professional boxing. His professional record is 21 wins, with 16 coming via the way of knockout, and 4 losses.

== Arrest ==
On February 6, 2019, the Virgin Islands Police Department arrested John Jackson and charged him with having sex with a 15-year-old girl. On 23 February, Jackson was also arrested by Homeland Security Investigations for the production of child pornography stemming from a sexual offense against a 15-year old girl. On April 18, 2019, Jackson was issued a ten-count indictment, charging him with two counts of production of child pornography, three counts of transportation of a minor with intent to engage in criminal sexual activity, one count of first-degree rape, and three counts of second-degree aggravated rape. Jackson was convicted on all charges in April 2022. Jackson was sentenced to 25 years in prison.

== Professional boxing record ==
21 Wins (16 Knockouts), 4 Losses (2 Knockouts), 0 Draws
Res.	Record	Opponent	Type	Rd., Time	Date	Location	Notes
Loss	21–4	(United States) Eric Walker	UD	5	2018-04-28	(United States) LADC Studios, Los Angeles, California, U.S.	
Win	21–3	(Mexico) Lucio Galindo	TKO	1	2017-07-01	Auditorio Municipal Jaltenco, Jaltenco, Mexico	
Loss	20–3	(United States) Jermell Charlo	TKO	8 (12)	2016-05-21	(United States) The Cosmopolitan, Paradise, Nevada, U.S.	For vacant WBC super welterweight title
Win	20–2	(Philippines) Dennis Laurente	UD	10	2015-08-02	(United States) Full Sail University, Winter Park, Florida, U.S.	
Win	19–2	(Argentina) Carlos Adán Jerez	UD	10	2014-11-15	Quorum Córdoba Hotel, Córdoba, Argentina	
Loss	18–2	(Republic of Ireland) Andy Lee	KO	5 (10)	7 Jun 2014	(United States) Madison Square Garden, New York City, New York, U.S.	For vacant NABF super welterweight title
Win	18–1	(Argentina) Jorge Daniel Miranda	TKO	8	2013-12-07	Club Atlético Talleres, Córdoba, Argentina	
Win	17–1	(United States) Tony Hirsch	UD	8	2013-08-17	(United States) Mark C. Marin Center, Charlotte Amalie, US Virgin Islands	
Win	16–1	(United States) Cerresso Fort	UD	8	2013-04-19	(United States) Tropicana Hotel & Casino, Atlantic City, New Jersey, U.S.	
Win	15–1	(Mexico) Alexis Pena	KO	1	2013-03-08	(United States) Resorts Hotel & Casino, Atlantic City, New Jersey, U.S.	
Win	14–1	(Dominican Republic) Alexander Hernandez	TKO	1	2012-12-17	Dominican Fiesta Hotel & Casino, Santo Domingo, Dominican Republic	
Loss	13–1	(United States) Willie Nelson	UD	10	2012-09-15	(United States) Thomas & Mack Center, Paradise, Nevada, U.S.	For vacant NABF super welterweight title
Win	13–0	(United States) Jesus Selig	TKO	3	2012-04-25	(United States) Mark C. Marin Center, Charlotte Amalie, US Virgin Islands	Retained WBC Youth super welterweight title
Win	12–0	(United States) KeAndrae Leatherwood	TKO	6	2011-12-16	(United States) Mandalay Bay Resort & Casino, Islander Ballroom, Paradise, Nevada, U.S.	Won vacant WBC Youth super welterweight title
Win	11–0	(Dominican Republic) Jose Vidal Soto	TKO	2	2011-09-19	Polideportvo Eleoncio Mercedes, La Romana, Dominican Republic	
Win	10–0	(Brazil) Jack Welson	TKO	3	2011-04-19	Anfiteatro del Río Uruguay, Paysandú, Uruguay	
Win	9–0	(Argentina) Carlos Andres Araya	UD	6	2011-01-09	Hotel & Casino Conrad, Punta Del Este, Uruguay	
Win	8–0	(Mexico) Manuel Martinez	TKO	4	2010-10-29	Gimnasio Municipal, Mexicali, Mexico	
Win	7–0	(Dominican Republic) Valerio Marte	TKO	1	2010-08-19	Dominican Fiesta Hotel & Casino, Santo Domingo, Dominican Republic	
Win	6–0	(Mexico) Alvaro Clinton Ayala	TKO	3	2010-05-21	Malecon Turistico, Guaymas, Mexico	
Win	5–0	(Dominican Republic) Rafael De la Cruz	TKO	3	2009-12-21	Coliseo Carlos 'Teo' Cruz, Santo Domingo, Dominican Republic	
Win	4–0	(Puerto Rico) Jonathan Illas Cordero	KO	1	2009-09-26	(United States) UVI Sports & Fitness Center, Charlotte Amalie, US Virgin Islands	
Win	3–0	(Puerto Rico) IIdefonso Soto	TKO	2	2009-05-30	(United States) UVI Sports & Fitness Center, Charlotte Amalie, US Virgin Islands	
Win	2–0	(United States) Steven Grove	TKO	1	2009-03-27	(United States) UVI Sports & Fitness Center, Charlotte Amalie, US Virgin Islands	
Win	1–0	(United States) Alphonso Alexander	TKO	2	2009-01-30	(United States) UVI Sports & Fitness Center, Charlotte Amalie, US Virgin Islands	
