= Craig McEwan (boxer) =

Scottish boxer

Personal information
- Nickname: Scottish
- Nationality: Scottish
- Born: Craig MacIntosh McEwan; 13 April 1982 (age 44) Edinburgh, Scotland
- Weight: Middleweight

Boxing career
- Stance: Southpaw

Boxing record
- Total fights: 29
- Wins: 23
- Win by KO: 10
- Losses: 4
- Draws: 2
- No contests: 0
Medal record
Representing Scotland
Commonwealth Games
Bronze medal – third place	2002 Manchester	Light middleweight
Arafura Games
Gold medal – first place	2005 Darwin	Middleweight
Multi Nations Tournament
Gold medal – first place	2005 Ballybunion	Middleweight
Bronze medal – third place	2005 Liverpool	Middleweight
British Nations Tournament
Bronze medal – third place	2005 Liverpool	Middleweight

Craig McEwan (born 13 April 1982) is a Scottish former professional boxer who competed from 2006 to 2016.

== Amateur career ==
McEwan had his first competitive bout at age eleven. During his teenage years, McEwan developed into one of Scotland's top amateur boxers. In his thirteen years as an amateur boxer, he fought three hundred and seventy-six matches, won ten gold medals in international tournaments, and regularly captained the Scottish International Team. On several occasions, he was crowned Scottish champion at both junior and senior level, as well as being European Junior Champion and Senior British & Irish Four Nations Champion. He has twice represented Scotland in the Commonwealth Games, winning a bronze medal in 2002. In 2005, McEwan broke Scotland's amateur boxing record by winning three gold medals at the international level.

== Professional career ==
McEwan was a prospect and his talent and skills were enough to be signed by promoter Oscar De La Hoya as Golden Boy Promotions' first Scottish fighter. McEwan previously fought out of The Wild Card gym in Hollywood, where he was trained by trainer Freddie Roach.

In a fight on 12 March 2011 against Irish boxer Andy Lee, billed "The Celtic War", McEwan, after an almost perfect boxing performance, was convincingly knocked out in the 10th round by a left hook. Two of the fight's judges had the match scored even while one had McEwan with a slight edge.

On 5 November 2011, McEwan was knocked out by Peter Quillin in the sixth round of their fight in Cancún, Mexico. McEwan protested the decision, claiming referee Manolo Alcocer stopped the fight too early.

In early 2012, his contract was not renewed by Golden Boy and he returned to the UK.

On 3 November 2012, McEwan suffered the third loss of his professional career when he lost a split decision in the quarter-final of a prizefighter tournament to a decorated Nigerian amateur boxing champion who went by the name of Larry Ekundayo (5–0). Ekundayo went on to win the tournament.

In April 2013, he signed a four-fight deal with New York-based promoter, Lou DiBella.

In December 2013, he lost a Unanimous Decision to American Dashon Johnson in New York. McEwan cited lack of support from his promoter & proper preparation following an extended absence from the ring, even struggling to organise sparring partners prior to the fight.

== Professional boxing record ==
29 fights	23 wins	4 losses
By knockout	12	2
By decision	11	2
Draws	2	

No.	Result	Record	Opponent	Type	Round, time	Date	Location	Notes
29	Draw	23–4–2	Sam Omidi	PTS	4	4 Mar 2016	Ravenscraig Regional Sports Facility, Motherwell, Scotland	
28	Win	23–4–1	Vaclav Skromach	TKO	1 (6), 2:29	15 Aug 2015	Lagoon Leisure Centre, Paisley, Scotland	
27	Loss	22–4–1	Dashon Johnson	UD	6	4 Dec 2013	BB King Blues Club & Grill, New York City, New York, US	
26	Draw	22–3–1	Alistair Warren	TD	1 (6), 2:33	13 Apr 2013	Grand Hall, Kilmarnock, Scotland	Fight stopped after Warren suffered an accidental cut.
25	Win	22–3	Mariusz Biskupski	KO	2 (8), 1:05	8 Dec 2012	Meadowbank Sports Centre, Edinburgh, Scotland	
24	Loss	21–3	Larry Ekundayo	SD	3	3 Nov 2012	York Hall, London, England	Prizefighter: The Light Middleweights III – Quarter-final
23	Win	21–2	Jay Morris	PTS	6	1 Sep 2012	Ice Arena, Dundee, Scotland	
22	Win	20–2	Paul Morby	PTS	8	14 Apr 2012	Meadowbank Sports Centre, Edinburgh, Scotland	
21	Loss	19–2	Peter Quillin	TKO	6 (10), 2:23	5 Nov 2011	Centro de Convenciones, Cancún, Mexico	
20	Loss	19–1	Andy Lee	TKO	10 (10), 0:56	12 Mar 2011	MGM Grand at Foxwoods, Ledyard, Connecticut, US	
19	Win	19–0	Danny Perez	MD	10	23 Jul 2010	Pechanga Resort & Casino, Temecula, California, US	
18	Win	18–0	Kris Andrews	TKO	8 (8), 2:11	3 Apr 2010	Mandalay Bay Events Center, Paradise, Nevada, US	
17	Win	17–0	James Parison	UD	8	28 Nov 2009	Colisée Pepsi, Quebec City, Quebec, Canada	
16	Win	16–0	Darnell Boone	SD	8	27 Jun 2009	Staples Center, Los Angeles, California, US	
15	Win	15–0	Brian Vera	UD	10	8 May 2009	Sundance Square, Fort Worth, Texas, US	
14	Win	14–0	Alexis Division	KO	1 (8), 1:49	11 Apr 2009	Mandalay Bay Events Center, Paradise, Nevada, US	
13	Win	13–0	Ivan Stovall	TKO	7 (8), 2:38	19 Feb 2009	Marriott Hotel, Irvine, California, US	
12	Win	12–0	Hilario Lopez	UD	8	27 Sep 2008	Home Depot Center, Carson, California, US	
11	Win	11–0	Juan Sanchez	TKO	3 (8), 1:35	4 Jul 2008	Dodge Arena, Hidalgo, Texas, US	
10	Win	10–0	Erik Rafael Esquivel	UD	8	22 Feb 2008	Morongo Casino, Cabazon, California, US	
9	Win	9–0	Alfredo Contreras	UD	8	7 Dec 2007	MGM Grand Garden Arena, Paradise, Nevada, US	
8	Win	8–0	Anthony Cannon	UD	6	2 Nov 2007	Morongo Casino, Cabazon, California, US	
7	Win	7–0	Nick Collins	TKO	5 (6), 1:34	7 Sep 2007	Desert Diamond Casino, Tucson, Arizona, US	
6	Win	6–0	Valentino Jalomo	TKO	4 (6), 1:07	27 Jul 2007	Desert Diamond Casino, Tucson, Arizona, US	
5	Win	5–0	Julio Perez	TKO	3 (4), 2:08	6 Jul 2007	Convention Center, McAllen, Texas, US	
4	Win	4–0	Isidro Arreola	TKO	4 (4), 0:44	10 Feb 2007	Mandalay Bay Events Center, Paradise, Nevada, US	
3	Win	3–0	Valentino Jalomo	UD	4	8 Dec 2006	Desert Diamond Casino, Tucson, Arizona, US	
2	Win	2–0	Tomas Padron	TKO	4 (4), 2:21	6 Oct 2006	Desert Diamond Casino, Tucson, Arizona, US	
1	Win	1–0	George Nicholas Montalvo	TKO	1 (4), 2:16	16 Sep 2006	MGM Grand Garden Arena, Paradise, Nevada, US	
