= Prizefight Boxing =

American boxing promotional company

Prize Fight is a boxing promotional company in the southern United States.

Prize Fight Boxing was created by brothers Brian and Russell Young.

Prize Fight has promoted fights such as: Lennox Lewis vs. Mike Tyson 2002, Roy Jones Jr. vs. Glen Johnson 2004, Antonio Tarver vs. Glen Johnson 2005, The 2004 United States Olympic Boxing Trials, and Jermain Taylor vs. Winky Wright.
