= Humble Civic Center Arena =

Multi-purpose arena in Humble, Texas

Coordinates: 29.980141°N 95.258801°W

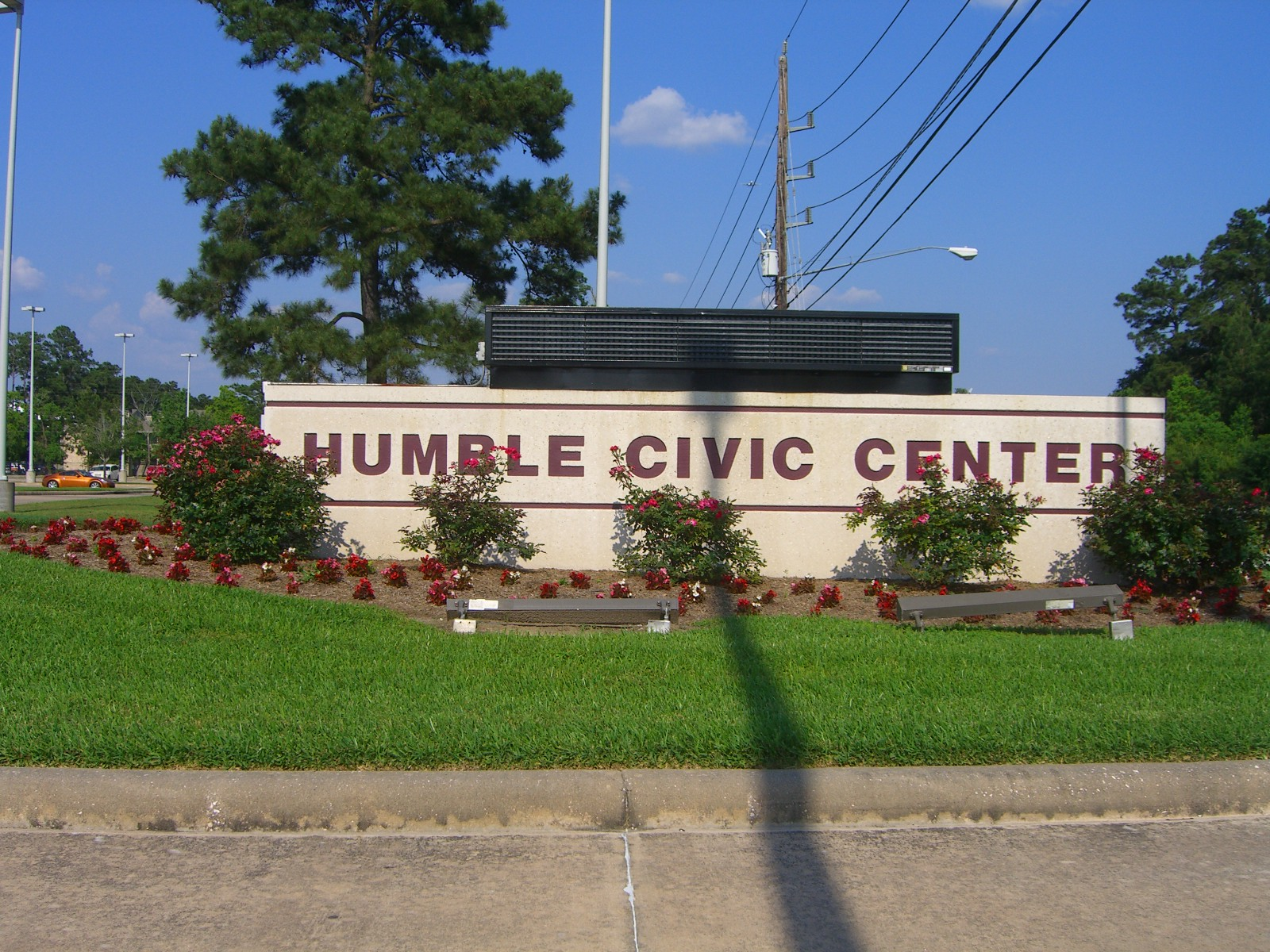
Entrance to Humble Civic Center

The Humble Civic Center Arena is a 7,500-seat multi-purpose arena in Humble, Texas, USA. It hosts local sporting events and concerts.
