= Caleb Truax =

American boxer

Personal information
- Nickname: Golden
- Born: September 14, 1983 (age 43) Osseo, Minnesota, U.S.
- Height: 6 ft 1 in (185 cm)
- Weight: Middleweight; Super middleweight

Boxing career
- Reach: 75 in (191 cm)
- Stance: Orthodox

Boxing record
- Total fights: 40
- Wins: 31
- Win by KO: 19
- Losses: 6
- Draws: 2
- No contests: 1

Caleb Truax (born September 14, 1983) is an American professional boxer. He held the IBF super middleweight title from 2017 to 2018, and challenged for the title in 2021. He also challenged once for the WBA (Regular) middleweight title in 2015.

== Personal life ==
Truax is a native of Osseo, Minnesota. He has a twin sister, Erin Truax, and a younger brother, Seth Martinez.

Truax is a 2002 graduate of Osseo Senior High School. While attending high school, he was an all-conference member of the Osseo Orioles football and baseball teams.

Truax then played football at Virginia State University for one year before a knee injury ended his gridiron career. He returned home in 2003 to attend the University of Minnesota, and it was there at the age of 19 that Truax entered a local Toughman contest. He lost his first fight, but soon became consumed by boxing—altering his diet and training as he pursued an amateur career.

Truax graduated from the University of Minnesota majoring in Sociology, minoring in both African American studies and Political Science.

== Amateur career ==
Truax compiled a record of 21 wins and 8 losses. In 2006 he was the USA Boxing State Champion, the Region 1 Champion, and the Upper Midwest Golden Gloves Champion.

== Professional career ==
Caleb Truax debuted as a professional fighter in April 2007 with a 2nd-round knockout of Ray Walker. As of March 2015, Truax has a professional record of 25 wins, one loss, and two draws. Truax has defeated Ossie Duran, Matt Vanda, Andy Kolle, Phil Williams, Jonathan Reid, Antwun Echols, Durrell Richardson, and James Crayton. His professional loss came to former undisputed middleweight world champion Jermain Taylor (Truax knocked Taylor down in the 9th round.)

Truax drew Ossie Duran in a 10-round non-title bout at the Target Center in Minneapolis. The bout was part of an eight-fight card promoted by Mike Tyson's new company, Iron Mike Productions. Mike Tyson was in attendance at the event, and said of Truax, "I hear he is exciting and he is something that we need for boxing, he is a breath of fresh air because boxing is in the doldrums right now. I'm looking forward to seeing him and if he is as much as everyone has told me."

=== WBA title bout ===
Truax faced Daniel Jacobs for the WBA (Regular) Middleweight title on April 24, 2015, and was stopped with 48 seconds left in the 12th and final round. A TKO loss. However Truax surprised the critics almost going the distance. The fight was broadcast on Spike TV as part of the Premier Boxing Champions

=== IBF World Super Middleweight title fight ===
On 9 December 2017, Truax fought British fighter James 'Chunky' DeGale at the Copper Box Arena in London, England, for Degale's IBF World Super Middleweight Title. Truax got off the mark the quickest and hit DeGale with several heavy shots throughout the fight. Although DeGale used his experience to come back into the fight in later rounds, it turned out to be too little too late. Truax showed great stamina and endurance to win the fight against the odds by Majority Decision, with scores of 116–112, 115-112 and 114–114 in favor of Truax. Although there was no re-match in the contract, DeGale immediately expressed his wish for a second fight upon losing. Truax's victory was possibly one of the biggest boxing upsets of 2017, with both Bookmakers and Boxing Media heavily favoring DeGale pre-fight.

=== Truax vs DeGale II ===
The rematch happened four months after, in Las Vegas. In what was a close and very competitive fight, Truax was overmatched by DeGale. The fight was full of clinches and headbutts, especially DeGale who got cut over his right eye, and was a bloody mess by the end of the fight. In the end, all three judges scored the fight in favor of DeGale, two of them scoring it 114-113 and one judge seeing a wider victory for DeGale, scoring the fight 117–100 in favor of DeGale.

On 13 April 2019, Truax fought Peter Quillin. The fight endend in a no-contest, because of an accidental head clash which caused a severe cut over Truax's right eye. After the fight, Truax stated that we was ready to continue, but the ringside physician made the final call.

In his next fight, Truax faced David Basajjamivule in his home state of Minnesota. Truax was more effective than his opponent during the fight, while Basajjamivule got a point deducted in two occasions, once for hitting Truax at the back of his head, and once for holding. Truax won the fight via majority-decision.

== Professional boxing record ==
40 fights	31 wins	6 losses
By knockout	19	2
By decision	12	4
Draws	2	
No contests	1	

No.	Result	Record	Opponent	Type	Round, time	Date	Location	Notes
40	Loss	31–6–2 (1)	Burley Brooks	UD	10	Jun 24, 2023	Minneapolis Armory, Minneapolis, Minnesota, U.S.	
39	Loss	31–5–2 (1)	Caleb Plant	UD	12	Jan 30, 2021	Shrine Exposition Center, Los Angeles, California, U.S.	For IBF super middleweight title
38	Win	31–4–2 (1)	David Basajjamivule	MD	10	Jan 25, 2020	Convention Center, Minneapolis, Minnesota, U.S.	
37	NC	30–4–2 (1)	Peter Quillin	NC	2 (12)	Apr 13, 2019	Minneapolis Armory, Minneapolis, Minnesota, U.S.	Fight stopped after Truax cut from accidental head clash
36	Win	30–4–2	Fabiano Pena	TKO	3 (10)	Aug 24, 2018	Minneapolis Armory, Minneapolis, Minnesota, U.S.	
35	Loss	29–4–2	James DeGale	UD	12	Apr 7, 2018	Hard Rock Hotel & Casino, Paradise, Nevada, U.S.	Lost IBF super middleweight title
34	Win	29–3–2	James DeGale	MD	12	Dec 9, 2017	Copper Box Arena, London, England	Won IBF super middleweight title
33	Win	28–3–2	KeAndrae Leatherwood	TKO	10	Aug 25, 2017	Grand Casino, Hinckley, Minnesota, U.S.	
32	Win	27–3–2	Zachariah Kelley	KO	2 (8)	Aug 20, 2016	Wisconsin Center, Milwaukee, Wisconsin, U.S.	
31	Loss	26–3–2	Anthony Dirrell	TKO	1 (10), 1:49	Apr 29, 2016	Trump Taj Mahal, Atlantic City, New Jersey, U.S.	
30	Win	26–2–2	Melvin Betancourt	TKO	4 (10)	Feb 20, 2016	Black Bear Casino, Carlton, Minnesota, U.S.	
29	Loss	25–2–2	Daniel Jacobs	TKO	12 (12), 2:12	Apr 24, 2015	UIC Pavilion, Chicago, Illinois, U.S.	For WBA (Regular) middleweight title
28	Win	25–1–2	Scott Sigmon	TKO	8 (10)	Nov 1, 2014	UIC Pavilion, Chicago, Illinois, U.S.	
27	Win	24–1–2	Derek Ennis	UD	10	Jul 25, 2014	UIC Pavilion, Chicago, Illinois, U.S.	
26	Draw	23–1–2	Ossie Duran	UD	10	Jan 3, 2014	Target Center, Minneapolis, Minnesota, U.S.	
25	Win	23–1–1	Cerresso Fort	TKO	4 (12), 1:49	Sep 21, 2013	Convention Center, Minneapolis, Minnesota, U.S.	Won vacant USA Minnesota State and IBF-USBA middleweight titles
24	Win	22–1–1	Don George	TKO	6 (8), 2:24	Jun 21, 2013	Convention Center, Minneapolis, Minnesota, U.S.	
23	Win	21–1–1	Matt Vanda	UD	10	Jan 19, 2013	Convention Center, Minneapolis, Minnesota, U.S.	
22	Win	20–1–1	Michael Walker	TKO	4 (8), 2:59	Nov 17, 2012	Crown Plaza Hotel, Saint Paul, Minnesota, U.S.	
21	Win	19–1–1	Mickey Scarborough	KO	1 (10), 1:57	Sep 22, 2012	Crown Plaza Hotel, Saint Paul, Minnesota, U.S.	
20	Loss	18–1–1	Jermain Taylor	UD	10	Apr 20, 2012	Beau Rivage Resort & Casino, Biloxi, Mississippi, U.S.	
19	Win	18–0–1	Andy Kolle	SD	10	May 27, 2011	St. Paul Armory, Saint Paul, Minnesota, U.S.	Won vacant USA Minnesota State middleweight title
18	Win	17–0–1	Phil Williams	MD	10	Feb 26, 2011	Grand Casino, Hinckley, Minnesota, U.S.	
17	Win	16–0–1	Jonathan Reid	TKO	9 (10), 2:29	Oct 9, 2010	Hyatt Regency Hotel, Minneapolis, Minnesota, U.S.	
16	Win	15–0–1	Antwun Echols	UD	10	Jun 11, 2010	St. Paul Armory, Saint Paul, Minnesota, U.S.	
15	Draw	14–0–1	Phil Williams	SD	10	Apr 23, 2010	St. Paul Armory, Saint Paul, Minnesota, U.S.	For vacant USA Minnesota State super middleweight title
14	Win	14–0	Kerry Hope	UD	10	Nov 20, 2009	National Guard Armory, Saint Paul, Minnesota, U.S.	Won vacant WBF International super middleweight title
13	Win	13–0	Patrick Perez	TKO	7 (8), 1:19	Jul 25, 2009	St. Paul Armory, Saint Paul, Minnesota, U.S.	
12	Win	12–0	Durrell Richardson	UD	8	Jun 5, 2009	Grand Casino, Hinckley, Minnesota, U.S.	
11	Win	11–0	Steve Walker	TKO	2 (6), 2:20	Feb 13, 2008	Epic Night Club, Minneapolis, Minnesota, U.S.	
10	Win	10–0	Johnny Hayes	TKO	5 (6)	Jan 24, 2009	Grand Casino, Hinckley, Minnesota, U.S.	
9	Win	9–0	Larry Brothers	TKO	1 (6), 2:27	Nov 28, 2008	Convention Center, Sioux Falls, South Dakota, U.S.	
8	Win	8–0	Robert Kliewer	KO	3 (6), 0:23	Aug 29, 2008	Grand Casino, Hinckley, Minnesota, U.S.	
7	Win	7–0	Thomas Rittenbaugh	UD	6	Jun 26, 2008	Tachi Palace Hotel, Lemoore, California, U.S.	
6	Win	6–0	James Crayton	TKO	4 (6)	May 17, 2008	St. Paul Armory, Saint Paul, Minnesota, U.S.	
5	Win	5–0	Jeffrey Osborne Jr	UD	6	Mar 29, 2008	The Myth, Maplewood, Minnesota, U.S.	
4	Win	4–0	Jeffrey Osborne Jr	UD	4	Nov 17, 2007	The Myth, Maplewood, Minnesota, U.S.	
3	Win	3–0	Terry Tock	KO	2 (4), 1:56	Jul 13, 2007	Grand Casino, Hinckley, Minnesota, U.S.	
2	Win	2–0	Nick Whiting	TKO	2 (4), 1:52	Jun 15, 2007	Roy Wilkins Auditorium, Saint Paul, Minnesota, U.S.	
1	Win	1–0	Ray Walker	TKO	2 (4)	Apr 6, 2007	Target Center, Minneapolis, Minnesota, U.S.	

== See also ==
- List of super-middleweight boxing champions

Achievements
Preceded by James DeGale	IBF super-middleweight champion December 9, 2017 - April 7, 2018	Succeeded by James DeGale
