= Peter Manfredo Jr. =

American boxer

Personal information
- Nickname: The Pride of Providence
- Born: November 26, 1980 (age 45) Providence, Rhode Island, U.S.
- Height: 5 ft 10 in (178 cm)
- Weight: Middleweight; Super middleweight

Boxing career
- Stance: Orthodox

Boxing record
- Total fights: 50
- Wins: 42
- Win by KO: 23
- Losses: 7
- Draws: 1

Peter Manfredo Jr. (born November 26, 1980) is an American former professional boxer and former IBO middleweight champion. He has challenged twice for upper-level world titles, at middleweight and super middleweight, as well as having won the NABO, IBU and European Boxing Association (EBA) light middleweight titles.

== Background ==
The son of Peter Manfredo Sr., a former professional boxer and world kickboxing champion who holds a third degree black belt in Tae Kwon Do, Manfredo Jr. grew up watching his father train and mentor boxers at the family's gym in Pawtucket, Rhode Island.

== Amateur career ==
Having started boxing at seven, Manfredo Jr. competed in his first match at nine. He then proceeded to fight in 165 amateur bouts, including a bronze medal-winning performance at the 2000 Eastern Olympic Trials. Manfredo is the only boxer in New England history to receive the Outstanding Boxer Award at the Junior Olympics, as well as win the title for the Silver Mittens, and the New England Golden Gloves. As an amateur Manfredo defeated future WBC, WBA, IBF Super middleweight champion Carl Froch., but lost several decisions to future undisputed middleweight champion Jermain Taylor in national competitions and even lost a decision in the 2nd round of the 1998 National Golden Gloves to future and fellow Contender finalist Sergio Mora

== Professional career ==
Manfredo Jr. eventually turned professional at the age of 19 and in his debut, he won a four-round decision over Steve Garrett. Less than two years later, he captured the EBA Light Middleweight Championship with an eighth-round TKO over Mike McFail. He successfully defended his EBA belt two months later, winning a unanimous ten-round decision over Charles Clark. In October 2002, in front of a packed arena of fans at the Dunkin Donuts Center in his hometown of Providence, Manfredo Jr. stepped up in weight class and won a seventh-round TKO over former WBC and WBA Light Welterweight champion Frankie “The Surgeon” Randall. Manfredo Jr.’s nineteenth consecutive victory came at the Blue Horizon in Philadelphia with a sixth-round TKO over Leonard Townsend. In January 2004, he went on to win the NABO Junior Middleweight title in a sixth-round fight against the previously undefeated Sherwin Davis in an ESPN2 co-feature at Foxwoods Casino.

=== The Contender ===
In 2005, he entered reality tv show The Contender, and was placed on the East Coast Team. He was challenged to fight Alfonso Gomez in the first fight, and lost—much to everyone's surprise. But when Jeff Fraza was withdrawn with chickenpox, he was brought back in—by "fate" he said. In his second chance, he beat Miguel Espino in the first round, and went on to face Joey Gilbert in the second round. Here, an accidental headbutt stopped the fight, and Manfredo was given a win on points. He then was re-matched up with Gomez, whom he beat, in the semi-final. In the final fight he was defeated by Sergio Mora in a seven-round unanimous decision, and Mora became the Contender champion. Manfredo fought a second bout against Mora on October 15, 2005, at the Staples Center in Los Angeles, California. Mora defeated Manfredo by a split decision in the rematch. Many ringside observers felt Manfredo won the fight convincingly, but Mora was awarded a controversial split decision.

=== After The Contender ===
Manfredo fought Scott Pemberton on February 2, 2006, to a sold-out crowd in the Dunkin' Donuts Center in Providence, Rhode Island, on ESPN. It was his first fight at Super Middleweight, as he won by a 3rd-round knockout. On October 14, 2006, Manfredo defeated Joey Spina with a 3rd-round TKO also at the Dunkin' Donuts Center.

=== WBO Super Middleweight Title ===
On April 7, 2007, Manfredo fought Welsh undefeated Super Middleweight Champion Joe Calzaghe in Calzaghe's 20th title defense. The fight was originally scheduled for March 3, but had to be re-arranged for the later date. The show, from the Millennium Stadium, Cardiff was aired on HBO in the United States. Manfredo lost the fight when the referee stopped the contest in the third round, with Manfredo appearing unable to reply to Calzaghe's unending barrage of shots. Manfredo claimed his plan was to have Calzaghe (then 34) "run out of gas". Manfredo himself believed that the fight was stopped prematurely. One month later Manfredo easily defeated Ted Muller in a ninth round stoppage at Twin River Casino in Lincoln Rhode Island.

Manfredo's next fight was June 20, 2007, just one month after his previous victory over Muller, at Foxwoods Hotel and Casino, against tough veteran (14–1) David Banks, who was featured on season 3 of the Contender. Manfredo got the relatively easy decision 97–93 on all the judges' cards. Manfredo then signed to fight former World Champion Jeff Lacy on December 8 at the MGM Grand Garden Arena, as the final bout on the undercard to the Floyd Mayweather vs Ricky Hatton main event. Manfredo lasted the distance against Lacy, but lost by unanimous decision.

On March 14, 2008, Manfredo defeated Shane Benfield, then (29–5), at the Twin River Events Center in Lincoln, Rhode Island. A series of attacks to the body from Manfredo eventually forced a stoppage after 2:30 of the sixth round. May 3, 2008, Peter defeated Luis Lopez by KO in the 3rd round at the Coeur D'Alene Casino Idaho.

On a CES card appropriately billed as “August Annihilation,” Manfredo savagely annihilated Donny by TKO of round two, on August 22 at the Twin Rivers Events Center winning the vacant NABF Interim super middleweight belt. The win put Manfredo as one of the top 5 Super Middleweights in the world.

=== IBO Super Middleweight Title ===
Manfredo would get an IBO Title shot in his next bout against Sakio Bika on November 13, 2008, at the Dunkin Donut Center. He was knocked out in the third round by the Season 3 winner of the Contender. With the loss, Manfredo dropped to 31–6. Manfredo stated after the fight that it may be his last time in the ring, but he later opted to fight again. He returned, on April 18, 2009, at the Montreal Casino, Montreal, and defeated Canadian super middleweight Walid Smichet by a devastating left hook in the last minute of round 7.

After the fight, Manfredo announced he is moving down to Middleweight, where he was ranked 9th in the World. He planned on fighting John Duddy, but Duddy had suffered his first loss in his last fight. He has stated multiple times, he would like to fight Sergio Mora a third time, this time being in Providence Rhode Island. On June 15, 2009, Manfredo signed a three-fight deal to be promoted exclusively by Chet Koerner's TKO Promotions. In his first fight with TKO Promotions, Peter defeated Ronald Weaver by 1st-round TKO, after Weaver refused to come out of his corner for the second round. The fight was a tune-up fight, fought for charity at the Jonathan Ogden Boxing Classic.

=== Another IBO Super Middleweight shot ===
On January 29, 2010, Peter Manfredo defeated St. Paul Minnesota native Matt Vanda by unanimous decision (100–89, 100–89, 99–90) in a 10-round attraction at Mohegan Sun Casino in Ledyard, Connecticut. He knocked down Vanda at the end of round 6. Manfredo was then crowned NABF Middleweight Champion and ranked 12th in the World in the middleweight division. The fight earned Manfredo a shot at the IBO Middleweight Title, which he won, when he defeated Mexican native Angel Hernandez on May 22, 2010.

=== WBC Super Middleweight shot ===
On November 12, 2010, Manfredo stopped Jhon Berrio for his fifth win in a row. The fight was stopped before the 7th round, when Berrio was unable to continue. On January 14, 2011, he outpointed Daniel Edouard for his sixth win in a row. Manfredo won a unanimous decision with scores of 97-92 and 98-91 (twice).

In November 2011, Peter Manfredo was stopped by Julio Cesar Chavez Jr in the fifth round of a WBC middleweight title bout. After an entertaining first four rounds "The Pride of Providence" seemed to decide he would go down swinging and engaged Chavez in a brawl. Manfredo got hurt and referee Laurence Cole stepped in at 1:52 to end the fight, allowing Julio Cesar Chavez Jr to retain the title.

=== Comeback ===
In November 2012, Peter Manfredo Jr announced his return to boxing and defeated durable veteran Rayco Saunders in a dominant 10-round decision. Four months later, he beat Contender Season 2 competitor Walter "2 Guns" Wright in a 10-round unanimous decision, Manfredo's 12th contest against Contender castmembers.

In July, after fellow Providence boxer and Contender participant, Gary Balletto, broke his neck at home, Manfredo announced he will take one more return to the ring in November at the Twin River Event Center, against The Contender 4 participant Richard Gingras in honor of Balletto, Manfredo's 13th fight against former Contender series participants, which he won by 8th round tko when the referee waved off the fight after he landed a right uppercut and left hook.

== Professional boxing record ==
42 Wins (23 knockouts, 19 decisions), 7 Losses (3 knockouts, 4 by decision), 1 Draw

Result	Opponent	Type	Round	Date	Location	Notes
Win	(Colombia) Milton Núñez	TKO	4	2019-12-07	Foxwoods Resort, Mashantucket, Connecticut, United States	
Win	(United States) Melvin Russell	KO	1	2019-11-23	Twin River Events Center, Lincoln, Rhode Island, United States	
Draw	(Cape Verde) Vladine Biosse	SD	8	2016-05-13	Twin River Events Center, Lincoln, Rhode Island, United States	
Win	(United States) Richard Gingras	TKO	8	2013-11-22	Twin River Events Center, Lincoln, Rhode Island, United States	
Win	(United States) Walter Wright	UD	10	2013-03-15	Twin River Events Center, Lincoln, Rhode Island, United States	
Win	(United States) Rayco Saunders	UD	10	2012-11-29	Twin River Events Center, Lincoln, Rhode Island, United States	
Loss	(Mexico) Julio César Chávez Jr.	TKO	5	2011-11-19	Reliant Arena, Houston, Texas, United States	For WBC middleweight title
Win	(Haiti) Daniel Edouard	UD	10	2011-01-14	Mallory Square, Key West, Florida, United States	
Win	(Colombia) Jhon Berrio	RTD	6	2010-11-12	(United States) American Airlines Arena, Miami, Florida, US	
Win	(Mexico) Angel Hernandez	TKO	10	2010-05-22	Mohegan Sun Casino, Uncasville, Connecticut, United States	Won vacant IBO middleweight title
Win	(United States) Matt Vanda	UD	10	2010-01-29	(United States) Mohegan Sun Casino, Uncasville, Connecticut, US	Won vacant WBC-NABF middleweight title
Win	(United States) Ronald Weaver	RTD	1	2009-11-05	Martin's Valley Mansion, Cockeysville, Maryland, United States	
Win	(Tunisia) Walid Smichet	KO	7	2009-04-18	Montreal Casino, Montreal, Quebec, Canada	
Loss	(Cameroon) Sakio Bika	TKO	3	2008-11-13	Dunkin' Donuts Center, Providence, Rhode Island, United States	For vacant IBO super middleweight title
Win	(United States) Donny McCrary	TKO	2	2008-08-22	(United States) Twin River Event Center, Lincoln, Rhode Island, US	Won WBC-NABF interim middleweight title
Win	(United States) Luis Lopez	RTD	3	2008-05-03	Coeur d'Alene Casino, Worley, Idaho, United States	
Win	(United States) Shane Benfield	TKO	6	2008-03-14	(United States) Pechanga Entertainment Center, Temecula, California, US	
Loss	(United States) Jeff Lacy	UD	10	2007-12-08	MGM Grand, Las Vegas, Nevada, United States	
Win	(United States) David Banks	UD	10	2007-06-20	Foxwoods Resort, Mashantucket, Connecticut, United States	
Win	(United States) Ted Muller	TKO	9	2007-05-11	Twin River Event Center, Lincoln, Rhode Island, United States	
Loss	(Wales) Joe Calzaghe	TKO	3	2007-04-07	Millennium Stadium, Cardiff, Wales, United Kingdom	For WBO super middleweight title
Win	(United States) Joe Spina	TKO	3	2006-10-14	Dunkin' Donuts Center, Providence, Rhode Island, United States	
Win	(United States) Scott Pemberton	TKO	3	2006-02-13	Dunkin' Donuts Center, Providence, Rhode Island, United States	
Loss	(United States) Sergio Mora	SD	8	2005-10-15	Staples Center, United States	
Loss	(United States) Sergio Mora	UD	7	2005-05-24	Caesars Palace, Las Vegas, United States	The Contender Season 1 – final
Win	(Mexico) Alfonso Gomez	UD	7	2004-09-23	Pasadena, United States	The Contender Season 1 – semifinals
Win	(United States) Joey Gilbert	TD	5	2004-09-18	Pasadena, United States	The Contender Season 1 – quarterfinals
Win	(United States) Miguel Espino	UD	5	2004-08-30	Pasadena, United States	The Contender Season 1 – preliminary round
Loss	(Mexico) Alfonso Gomez	UD	5	2004-08-18	Pasadena, United States	The Contender Season 1 – preliminary round
Win	(United States) Anthony Bonsante	UD	12	2004-05-14	(United States) Rhode Island Convention Center, Providence, Rhode Island, US	Retained WBO-NABO light middleweight title
Win	(United States) Sherwin Davis	KO	6	2004-01-23	(United States) Foxwoods Resort Casino, Mashantucket, Connecticut, US	Won WBO-NABO light middleweight title
Win	(United States) Leonard Townsend	TKO	6	2003-09-12	(United States) Blue Horizon, Philadelphia, Pennsylvania, US	
Win	(United States) Victor Rosado	UD	10	2003-06-27	(United States) Dunkin' Donuts Center, Providence, Rhode Island, US	
Win	(United States) Ron Johnson	TKO	2	2003-04-26	(United States) Shaw's Convention Center, Brockton, Massachusetts, US	
Win	(United States) Frankie Randall	TKO	7	2002-10-04	(United States) Dunkin' Donuts Center, Providence, Rhode Island, US	Won IBU light middleweight title
Win	(United States) Charles Clark	UD	10	2002-07-26	(United States) Rhodes-on-the Pawtuxet, Cranston, Rhode Island, US	Retained EBA light middleweight title
Win	(United States) Mike McFail	TKO	8	2002-05-24	(United States) Rhodes-on-the Pawtuxet, Cranston, Rhode Island, US	Won EBA light middleweight title
Win	(United States) Grady Brewer	UD	8	2002-04-04	(United States) Foxwoods Resort Casino, Mashantucket, Connecticut, US	
Win	(United States) Tommy Attardo	UD	4	2002-03-01	(United States) Foxwoods Resort Casino, Mashantucket, Connecticut, US	
Win	(United States) John Lennox Lewis	UD	6	2001-12-13	(United States) Mohegan Sun Casino, Uncasville, Connecticut, US	
Win	(United States) Kenny Stubbs	TKO	4	2001-11-16	(United States) Rhodes-on-the Pawtuxet, Cranston, Rhode Island, US	
Win	(Canada) Ian Gardner	SD	4	2001-11-02	(United States) Foxwoods Resort Casino, Mashantucket, Connecticut, US	
Win	(United States) Troy Barnes	UD	4	2001-09-21	(United States) Rhodes-on-the Pawtuxet, Cranston, Rhode Island, US	
Win	(United States) Rhon Roberts	UD	4	2001-08-10	(United States) Foxwoods Resort Casino, Mashantucket, Connecticut, US	
Win	(United States) Antonio Baker	TKO	4	2001-06-02	(United States) Rhodes-on-the Pawtuxet, Cranston, Rhode Island, US	
Win	(United States) Manuel Antonio Teo	TKO	4	2001-05-04	(United States) Mohegan Sun Casino, Uncasville, Connecticut, US	
Win	(United States) Ron Carnell	TKO	1	2001-03-02	(United States) Rhodes-on-the Pawtuxet, Cranston, Rhode Island, US	
Win	(United States) Cornell Hester	TKO	2	2000-12-22	Foxwoods Resort, Mashantucket, Connecticut, United States	
Win	(United States) Francisco Arroche	PTS	4	2000-11-17	(United States) Rhodes-on-the Pawtuxet, Cranston, Rhode Island, US	
Win	(United States) Steve Garrett	PTS	4	2000-09-22	(United States) Rhodes-on-the Pawtuxet, Cranston, Rhode Island, US	

Preceded by Incumbent	EBA Light Middleweight Champion; May 24, 2002 – ? Vacated	Vacant Title next held by Incumbent
Preceded by Stephan Johnson	IBU Light Middleweight Champion; November 29, 2003 – June 3, 2006; Vacated	Vacant Title next held by Christopher Henry
Preceded by Anthony Mundine	IBO Middleweight Champion; May 22, 2010 – March 13, 2011; Vacated	Vacant Title next held by Avtandil Khurtsidze
