= Caleb Plant vs. Caleb Truax =

2021 boxing match

- Date: January 30, 2021
- Venue: Shrine Exposition Center, Los Angeles, California
- Title(s) on the line: IBF super middleweight title

Tale of the tape
| Boxer | (United States) Caleb Plant | (United States) Caleb Truax |
| Nickname | "Sweet Hands" | "Golden" |
| Hometown | Ashland City, Tennessee | Osseo, Minnesota |
| Purse | $750,000 | $150,000 |
| Pre-fight record | 20–0 (12 KO) | 31–4–2 (1) (19 KO) |
| Age | 28 years, 6 months | 37 years, 4 months |
| Height | 6 ft 1 in (185 cm) | 6 ft 1 in (185 cm) |
| Weight | 167 1/2 lb (76 kg) | 167.8 lb (76 kg) |
| Style | Orthodox | Orthodox |
| Recognition | IBF; Super Middleweight Champion; The Ring; No. 2 Ranked Super Middleweight; TBRB; No. 3 Ranked Super Middleweight | IBF; No. 1 Ranked Super Middleweight |

Result
- Plant wins by unanimous decision (120-108, 120-108, 120-108)

Caleb Plant vs. Caleb Truax was a professional boxing fight that took place on Saturday, January 30, 2021, at the Shrine Exposition Center in Los Angeles, California. It featured American Caleb Plant, the International Boxing Federation's world Super Middleweight champion, defending his world title in a twelve-round match against former world champion of the same division and boxing organization, American Caleb Truax.

Plant was a heavy favorite to win this bout on the betting lines.

== Background ==
=== Caleb Truax ===
Caleb Truax began his professional boxing career on April 6, 2007, defeating Ray Walker by second-round knockout in Minneapolis, Minnesota. He ran a record of 18 wins, no losses and one draw (tie), with ten knockout wins before dropping a ten rounds unanimous decision to former unified world Middleweight champion Jermain Taylor on April 20, 2012 in Biloxi, Mississippi, but not before dropping Taylor to the floor in round eight, almost winning the bout by knockout.

Truax won seven of his next eight bouts with one draw (tie); these included wins against Matt Vanda and Donovan George, the tie being against Ossie Duran. Then, on April 24, 2015, Truax received his first world title try, against World Boxing Association world Middleweight champion Daniel Jacobs; despite winning a few rounds on one of the judges' cards, Truax was significantly behind with scores of 107–102, 108-101 and 109-100 all against him when he was stopped in round twelve, Jacobs retaining the world title by a technical knockout.

Caleb Truax then won three of his next four presentations, the lone blemish during that four fight span being a first-round knockout loss at the hands of multiple time world champion Anthony Dirrell; setting himself for another world championship fight, this time against British boxer James DeGale; Truax-DeGale I came off on December 9, 2017 at the Copper Box Arena in Hackney Wick, London, England and Truax became the International Boxing Federation's world Super-Middleweight champion by beating DeGale by a twelve rounds majority decision. The distinction of being a current world champion, however, did not last long for Truax, as a rematch between him and DeGale took place four months later at the Hard Rock Cafe Hotel and Casino in Las Vegas, Nevada as the co-main event of a boxing program that also included Erislandy Lara's loss in a world Super-Welterweight championship bout to Jarrett Hurd on April 7, 2018 in a show televised by Showtime Championship Boxing. DeGale turned the tables on Truax by winning by twelve rounds unanimous decision.

After the rematch with DeGale, Truax had three bouts before meeting Plant, two of them wins and one of them a second round no decision against Peter Quillin on April 13, 2019, when a headbutt caused a cut on Truax's head and he was not able to continue. In his last contest prior to the fight against Plant, Truax defeated David Basajjamivule by a ten rounds majority decision on January 25, 2020, two judges giving Truax the win while the third one scored the contest a tie. Partly because of the COVID-19 pandemic of 2020–21, Truax had been inactive since then. The former world champion sported a record of 31 wins, 4 losses and two draws (ties) with 19 wins and two losses by knockout coming into the fight with Plant.

=== Caleb Plant ===
For his part, Caleb Plant made his professional boxing debut on May 10, 2014, disposing of Travis Davidson in round one by knockout at Los Angeles, California He won his first 17 bouts, 10 by knockout, before challenging Jose Uzcategui for the IBF's world Super-Middleweight championship on January 13, 2019 at the Microsoft Theater in Los Angeles. Plant dropped the champion, who had 28 wins and only 2 losses previously, twice (once in round two, then once in round four) on his way to becoming a world champion by defeating Uzcategui by twelve rounds unanimous decision. He then retained the title twice, once by third-round knockout on July 20, 2019 against Mike Lee and then by tenth-round knockout on February 15, 2020 versus Vincent Feigenbutz; Plant's career was also affected by the COVID-19 outbreak as he was inactive since the Feigenbutz match; by the time the first bell of the fight with Truax sounded, Plant had been fightless for 11 months and a half. The champion came into the bout with a record of 20 wins and 0 losses, 12 of those wins coming by knockout.

Plant predicted he would win the contest by knockout and was looking forward to meeting Canelo Alvarez next.

== Fight ==
Plant dominated the fight outboxing Truax from a distance while Truax tried unsuccessfully to get closer and force the action at close range. Truax suffered a bruise and a cut by the end of the fourth round. In the fifth, Truax attacked Plant but Plant used his jab punch to stay out of trouble.

Round eight saw Truax connect with a troublesome right to Plant's jaw but Plant tried to get a knockout win in the ninth, becoming a bit more aggressive. In the twelfth and final round, Truax, seemingly sensing he needed a knockout to win the fight, threw punches from all angles in an effort to land a knockout punch, but Plant did not get hurt.

After the scheduled twelve rounds of fighting were over, Plant was announced as winner by unanimous decision, the three judges scoring the bout by 120-108 in his favor, meaning he won all twelve rounds on each of the judges' scorecards. Truax became 31-5-2 with 19 knockout wins and 2 knockout losses after the fight, while Plant's record went to 21-0, with 12 knockout wins.

== Television broadcast ==
In the United States, the bout was televised on Fox Sports and Fox Deportes' Premier Boxing Champions.

== Undercard fights ==
There were seven fights that took place before the event's main fight on this boxing program:

=== Televised bouts ===
- Michael Polite Coffie KO3 Darmani Rock
- Rances Barthelemy WUD 10 All Rivera (not to be confused with Michel Rivera, also a boxer, who is known as "Ali Rivera")

=== Untelevised bouts ===
- Joey Spencer KO1 Isiah Seldon
- Brandyn Lynch draw (tie) 8 Mark Anthony Hernandez
- Atif Oberlton KO3 Nathan Davis Sharp
- Daniel Garcia (not to be confused with another boxer with a similar name) KO4 Jose Delgado
- Fernando Angel Molina KO1 James De Herrera

| Preceded by vs. Vincent Feigenbutz | Caleb Plant's bouts January 30, 2021 | Succeeded by vs. Canelo Álvarez |
| Preceded by vs. David Basajjamivule | Caleb Truax's bouts January 30, 2021 | Succeeded by vs. Burley Brooks |
