= Ossie Duran =

Ghanaian boxer (born 1977)

Personal information
- Nickname: The Ghanaian Gladiator
- Nationality: Congolese
- Born: Osumanu Yahaya; 23 April 1977 (age 49) Accra, Ghana
- Height: 5 ft 10 in (178 cm)
- Weight: Lightweight; Light welterweight Welterweight; Light middleweight Middleweight; Super middleweight

Boxing career
- Reach: 72 in (183 cm)
- Stance: Orthodox

Boxing record
- Total fights: 42
- Wins: 28
- Win by KO: 11
- Losses: 11
- Draws: 3

Ossie "The Ghanaian Gladiator" Duran (born 23 April 1977) is a Ghanaian professional boxer, whose career has spanned over 3 decades (1990's/2000's/2010's).

He has won the Ghanaian lightweight title, World Boxing Federation (WBF) Pan-European welterweight title, WBF European Welterweight Title, United States Boxing Association (USBA) Atlantic Coast Region middleweight title, Commonwealth welterweight title, and Commonwealth light middleweight title, drew with Eromosele Albert for the vacant International Boxing Federation (IBF) Continental Africa light middleweight title, and was a challenger for the Commonwealth lightweight title against David Tetteh, World Boxing Organization (WBO) North American Boxing Organization (NABO) middleweight title against Fernando Guerrero, and World Boxing Council (WBC) Silver middleweight title against Avtandil Khurtsidze.

His professional fighting weight varied from 135 lb (61 kg; 9 st 9 lb), (lightweight) to 161 lb (73 kg; 11 st 7 lb), (super middleweight).

He is trained by Lenny DeJesus.

== Professional boxing record ==
42 fights	28 wins	11 losses
By knockout	11	1
By decision	17	10
Draws	3	

No.	Result	Record	Opponent	Type	Round, time	Date	Location	Notes
42	Draw	28–11–3	(United States) Caleb Truax	UD	10	3 Jan 2014	(United States) Target Center, Minneapolis, Minnesota, U.S.	
41	Loss	28–11–2	(Russia) Matt Korobov	KO	3 (8), 0:51	15 Jun 2013	(United States) American Airlines Center, Dallas, Texas, U.S.	
40	Win	28–10–2	(United States) Joshua Snyder	UD	6	13 Oct 2012	(United States) Essex County College, Newark, New Jersey, U.S.	
39	Loss	27–10–2	(Georgia (country)) Avtandil Khurtsidze	MD	12	18 Dec 2011	Sport Palace Yunost, Zaporizhzhia, Ukraine	For vacant WBC Silver middleweight title
38	Loss	27–9–2	(United States) Brandon Gonzáles	SD	8	28 Oct 2011	(United States) Bally's Atlantic City, Atlantic City, New Jersey, U.S.	
37	Win	27–8–2	(United States) Latif Mundy	TKO	10 (10), 2:29	22 Jun 2011	(United States) Robert Treat Hotel, Newark, New Jersey, U.S.	Won inaugural IBF-USBA Atlantic Coast Region middleweight title
36	Win	26–8–2	(United States) Matt Vanda	UD	10	12 Nov 2010	(United States) Schuetzen Park, North Bergen, New Jersey, U.S.	
35	Win	25–8–2	(United States) Jamaal Davis	UD	4	27 Feb 2010	(United States) Bally's Atlantic City, Atlantic City, New Jersey, U.S.	
34	Loss	24–8–2	(United States) Fernando Guerrero	MD	10	10 Oct 2009	(United States) Arthur W. Perdue Stadium, Salisbury, Maryland, U.S.	
33	Loss	24–7–2	(Mexico) David Alonso López	UD	10	10 Apr 2009	(United States) Desert Diamond Casino, Tucson, Arizona, U.S.	
32	Draw	24–6–2	(Nigeria) Eromosele Albert	SD	12	23 Sep 2008	(United States) Hammerstein Ballroom, Manhattan, New York, U.S.	For vacant IBF African super welterweight title
31	Loss	24–6–1	(United States) James Kirkland	UD	10	1 Jun 2007	(United States) Chumash Casino Resort, Santa Ynez, California, U.S.	
30	Win	24–5–1	(United States) Jonathan Reid	UD	8	9 Feb 2007	(United States) Providence Convention Center, Providence, Rhode Island, U.S.	
29	Win	23–5–1	(United States) Gil Reyes	UD	6	7 Jul 2006	(United States) Cape Cod Melody Tent, Hyannis, Massachusetts, U.S.	
28	Win	22–5–1	(Venezuela) Marcos Primera	UD	6	18 May 2006	(United States) Providence Convention Center, Providence, Rhode Island, U.S.	
27	Loss	21–5–1	(Wales) Bradley Pryce	UD	12	11 Mar 2006	Newport Centre, Newport, Wales	Lost Commonwealth super welterweight title
26	Win	21–4–1	(Scotland) Colin McNeil	UD	12	23 Sep 2005	Hilton Hotel, Mayfair, England	Retained Commonwealth super welterweight title
25	Win	20–4–1	(Benin) Frank Daabisi	KO	3 (8)	18 Dec 2004	Ohene Djan Sports Stadium, Accra, Ghana	
24	Win	19–4–1	(England) Jamie Moore	KO	3 (12), 1:06	26 Jun 2004	King's Hall, Belfast, Northern Ireland	Won Commonwealth super welterweight title
23	Win	18–4–1	(Togo) Dick Dosseh	TKO	3 (8)	3 Apr 2004	Hall des Arts, Cotonou, Benin	
22	Win	17–4–1	(Ghana) Agoe Ashong	UD	10	6 Mar 2004	Accra Sports Stadium, Accra, Ghana	
21	Win	16–4–1	(Ghana) Joshua Okine	PTS	12	26 Dec 2003	(Ghana) Accra Sports Stadium, Accra, aghana	Won vacant Commonwealth welterweight title
20	Loss	15–4–1	(Russia) Sergey Stepkin	UD	12	19 Jun 2003	Vityaz, Podolsk, Russia	For IBF Inter-Continental welterweight title
19	Win	15–3–1	(Northern Ireland) Glenn McClarnon	TKO	2 (8), 2:25	22 Mar 2003	Huddersfield Sports Centre, Huddersfield, England	
18	Win	14–3–1	(England) Delroy Mellis	PTS	10	13 Dec 2001	Equinox Nightclub, Leicester Square, England	Won inaugural WBF (Federation) European welterweight title
17	Win	13–3–1	(England) Howard Clarke	PTS	6	10 Nov 2001	Wembley Conference Centre, Wembley, England	
16	Win	12–3–1	(England) Geoff McCreesh	PTS	6	26 Apr 2001	Royal Garden Hotel, Kensington, England	
15	Win	11–3–1	(England) David Kirk	PTS	8	28 Feb 2001	Royal Garden Hotel, Kensington, England	
14	Win	10–3–1	(Belarus) Yuri Tsarenka	PTS	4	31 Oct 2000	Novotel Hotel, Hammersmith, England	
13	Win	9–3–1	(England) Mark Ramsey	TKO	2 (8), 2:42	28 Sep 2000	Royal Garden Hotel, Kensington, England	
12	Win	8–3–1	(South Africa) Vincent Nobela	PTS	6	19 Apr 2000	Royal Garden Hotel, Kensington, England	
11	Loss	7–3–1	(Lithuania) Ganny Dovidovas	PTS	4	9 Mar 2000	York Hall, London, England	
10	Loss	7–2–1	(Ghana) David Tetteh	PTS	12	6 Jun 1998	Accra, Ghana	For Commonwealth lightweight title
9	Win	7–1–1	(Ghana) Tony Danso	UD	12	4 Oct 1997	Accra, Ghana	Won vacant Ghanaian lightweight title
8	Win	6–1–1	(Ghana) Iron Cutter Cudjoe	TKO	2 (?)	6 Sep 1997	Accra Sports Stadium, Accra, Ghana	
7	Draw	5–1–1	(Ghana) Tony Danso	PTS	12	28 Jun 1997	Accra, Ghana	For vacant Ghanaian lightweight title
6	Win	5–1	(Benin) Abbas De Souza	TKO	6 (?)	26 Apr 1997	Benin	
5	Loss	4–1	(Nigeria) Ike Obi	PTS	10	5 Mar 1997	Abuja, Nigeria	
4	Win	4–0	(Ghana) Neuziwere Apolo	TKO	1 (?)	28 Dec 1996	Accra, Ghana	
3	Win	3–0	(Ghana) David Allotey	PTS	8	30 Nov 1996	Accra, Ghana	
2	Win	2–0	(Ivory Coast) Victor Abbey	TKO	2 (?)	20 Sep 1996	(Ivory Coast) Côte d'Ivoire	
1	Win	1–0	(Togo) Dick Dosseh	TKO	4 (?)	28 Aug 1996	Togo	
