= Andy Kolle =

American boxer

Personal information
- Nickname: Kaos
- Nationality: American
- Born: Fergus Falls, Minnesota, U.S.
- Height: 6 ft 1 in (185 cm)
- Weight: Middleweight

Boxing career
- Stance: Southpaw

Boxing record
- Total fights: 31
- Wins: 26
- Win by KO: 18
- Losses: 5

Andy Kolle alias Kaos (born April 27, 1982) is an American professional boxer.

== Professional career ==
Kolle made his professional debut with a third-round knockout win against Nick Whiting on March 6, 2004. In his professional career to date Kolle has notched wins against Matt Vanda (twice), Jonathan Reid, and Anthony Bonsante, while losing to Andre Ward, Paul Williams, Caleb Truax and Cerresso Fort.
