= Yori Boy Campas =

Mexican world champion boxer (b. 1971)

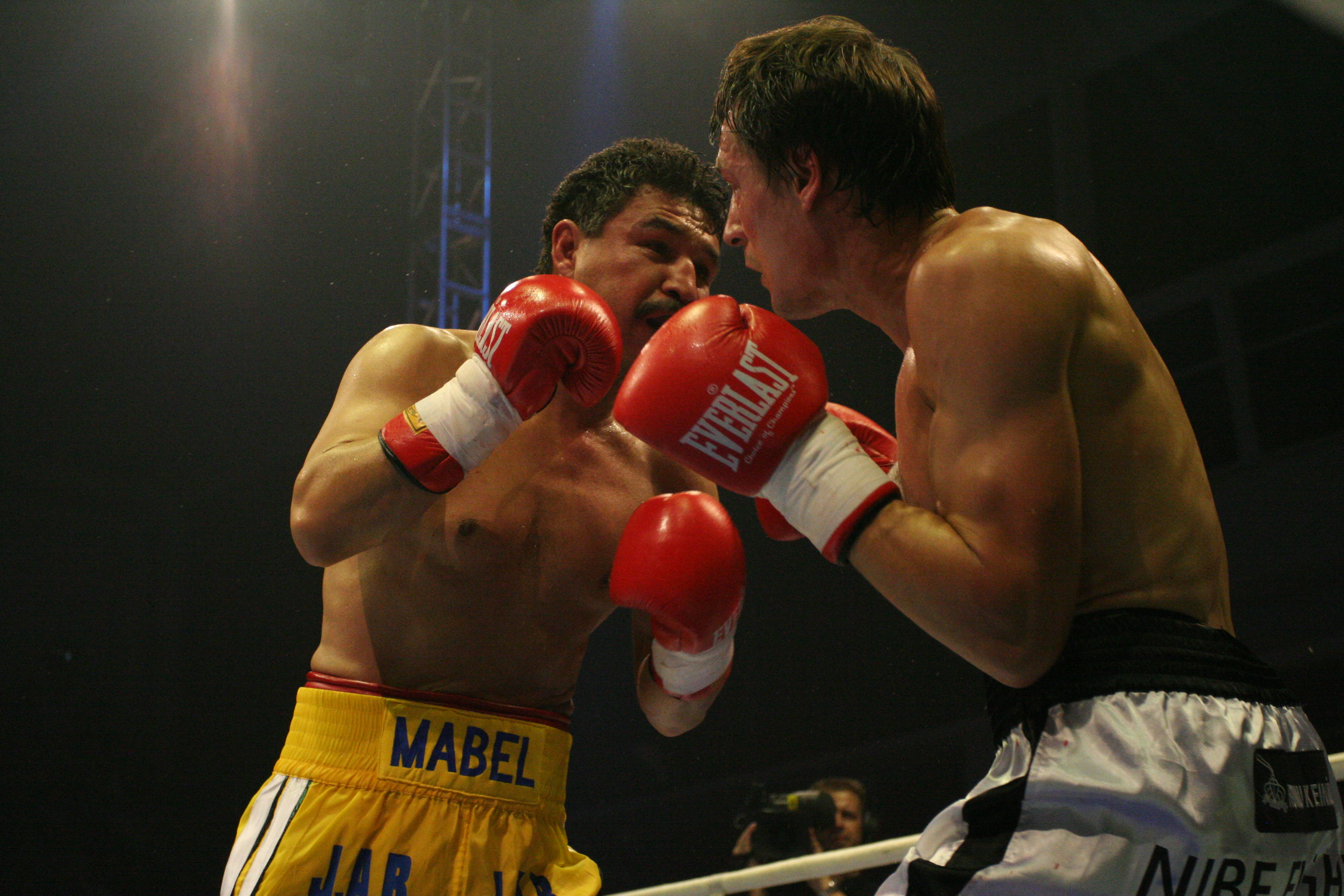
- Campas (yellow trunks)

Personal information
- Nickname: Yori Boy
- Born: Luis Ramón Campas Medina; August 6, 1971 (age 55) Navojoa, Sonora, Mexico
- Height: 5 ft 7 1/2 in (171 cm)
- Weight: Welterweight; Light middleweight; Middleweight

Boxing career
- Reach: 68 in (173 cm)
- Stance: Orthodox

Boxing record
- Total fights: 128
- Wins: 108
- Win by KO: 83
- Losses: 17
- Draws: 3

Luis Ramón "Yori Boy" Campas Medina (born August 6, 1971) is a Mexican former professional boxer who competed from 1987 to 2019. He held the IBF light middleweight title from 1997 to 1998.

== Background ==
He is a native of Navojoa, Sonora, Mexico, where the word Yori means white. When he was young and he walked into a gym for the first time, the way he hit opponents that day impressed his trainers, Chava Mendoza and Gilbert Marquez. He began to be nicknamed Yori Boy, and few actually know his real name is Luis Ramon. He trained in Three Forks, Montana, with his manager and trainer, Joe Diaz.

== Professional career ==
Campas, whose brother Armando was also a respected professional fighter, began his professional career on July 7, 1987 at the age of fifteen, by knocking out Gaby Vega in the first round at Ciudad Obregón, Sonora. His first thirteen fights were all won by knockout, and he built a record of 56-0 with 50 knockout wins by the time the IBF had him ranked as their number one world title challenger. Prior to that, he had won the Mexican and regional NABF welterweight titles. He won the NABF one on his first fight abroad, defeating Roger Turner by a twelve-round decision in Las Vegas, Nevada, on June 19, 1992.

=== Title: Fight against Trinidad ===
Campas also beat former world champion Jorge Vaca by a knockout in round two in Tijuana before getting his first world title fight on September 17, 1994 against Félix Trinidad for the IBF welterweight title as part of a Pay Per View undercard that featured Julio César Chávez's rematch against Meldrick Taylor for the WBC light welterweight title. Campas, who had been considered by many Mexicans to be the next Chávez, dropped Trinidad in round two, but he lost by a fourth-round technical knockout for his first professional defeat in 57 bouts.

Campas came back with seven straight wins, including one that gave him the WBO's regional NABO welterweight title, when he knocked out former world champion Genaro Leon in three rounds on August 7, 1995. On September 6, 1996, he was given a second world title try, against José Luis Lopez, for the WBO welterweight title, in Los Angeles, California. Campas lost by knockout in round six.

=== Capturing a World Title ===
Campas then decided to campaign in the light middleweight division, beating Fidel Avendano by a knockout in round two in his first fight there. Campas had four straight wins before challenging for a world title again, this time against IBF light middleweight champion Raul Marquez. On December 6, 1997, in Atlantic City, New Jersey, Campas became the world champion by knocking out Marquez in round eight. He defended his title three times, beating Anthony Stephens by a knockout in three at Ledyard, Connecticut; Pedro Ortega by a technical knockout in eleven at Tijuana; and former Trinidad opponent Larry Barnes by a knockout in three in Las Vegas. On December 12, 1998, however, he lost the title after retiring in his corner in the seventh round against Fernando Vargas in Las Vegas.

After two wins in a row, he lost to Oba Carr. For his next fight, however, he became the first boxer to beat Tony Ayala when Ayala was knocked out in round eight by Campas in San Antonio, Texas. On March 16, 2002, he received his next world title shot, for the vacant WBO light middleweight title, against Puerto Rico's Daniel Santos, once again in Las Vegas. He lost by knockout in round eleven.

After one more knockout win, he tried to gain the WBC and WBA light middleweight titles against Oscar De La Hoya on May 3, 2003, again in Las Vegas. He lost that fight by knockout in round seven.

During a press conference held in Phoenix, Arizona, on March 24, 2004, Campas announced he had moved to that city. Two days later, he returned to the ring after a ten-month layoff, defeating Dumont Dewey Welliver by a ten-round split decision. He followed his win over Welliver with an eight-round decision win over Raul Munoz, also in Phoenix. Campas then suffered a mild upset when he was beaten by the relatively unknown Eric Regan by decision in twelve rounds at Oroville, California.

His 2006 fight against Ireland's John Duddy was a candidate for the 2006 Fight of the Year.

=== 100th career victory ===
On 30 March 2012, Campas reached a significant milestone when he chalked up the 100th win of his career via a 2nd-round knockout of Mauro Lucero. The win gave Campas his 79th win inside the distance and improved his overall record to 100-16-1.

== Professional boxing record ==
128 fights	108 wins	17 losses
By knockout	83	9
By decision	25	8
Draws	3	

No.	Result	Record	Opponent	Type	Round, time	Date	Age	Location	Notes
128	Win	108–17–3	Alexis Canett	RTD	6 (10), 3:00	Jul 3, 2018	47 years, 331 days	Cancha Municipal, Navojoa, Mexico	
127	Win	107–17–3	Joel Cota	TKO	4 (10), 0:11	Mar 16, 2018	46 years, 222 days	Cancha Municipal, Navojoa, Mexico	
126	Win	106–17–3	Anthony Bonsante	DQ	6 (10)	Jan 23, 2016	44 years, 170 days	Civic Center, Butte, Montana, US	
125	Win	105–17–3	Glen Cislo	KO	2 (4)	Nov 7, 2015	44 years, 93 days	Headwater Livestock Yards, Three Forks, Montana, US	
124	Win	104–17–3	Chris Asher	KO	2 (6)	Aug 22, 2015	44 years, 16 days	Rodeo Grounds, Three Forks, Montana, US	
123	Win	103–17–3	Julio Cesar Lanzas	UD	6	Sep 27, 2014	43 years, 32 days	OKC Downtown Airpark, Oklahoma City, Oklahoma, US	
122	Win	102–17–3	Daniel Gonzalez	UD	6	Apr 5, 2014	42 years, 242 days	Silver Spur, Belgrade, Montana, US	
121	Draw	101–17–3	Gustavo Castro	TD	2 (10)	Oct 4, 2013	42 years, 59 days	Explanada Tecate, Navojoa, Mexico	
120	Draw	101–17–2	Christian Solano	TD	10 (10)	Jul 28, 2013	41 years, 356 days	Forum del Mayo, Navojoa, Mexico	
119	Win	101–17–1	Gabriel Martinez	SD	10	Feb 15, 2013	41 years, 193 days	Forum del Mayo, Navojoa, Mexico	
118	Loss	100–17–1	Les Sherrington	UD	12	Jul 28, 2012	40 years, 357 days	Gold Coast Convention Centre, Broadbeach, Australia	For vacant IBF Pan Pacific and WBF middleweight titles
117	Win	100–16–1	Mauro Lucero	KO	2 (10), 2:32	Mar 30, 2012	40 years, 237 days	Cancha Municipal, Navojoa, Mexico	
116	Loss	99–16–1	Jorge Cota	TKO	8 (10), 2:52	Nov 19, 2011	40 years, 105 days	Estadio Centenario, Los Mochis, Mexico	
115	Win	99–15–1	Marcelo Rodriguez	TKO	3 (10), 2:23	Aug 6, 2011	40 years, 0 days	Gimnasio Municipal, Navojoa, Mexico	Won vacant WBA Fedelatin middleweight title
114	Win	98–15–1	Rogelio Medina	TKO	6 (10)	Jun 17, 2011	39 years, 315 days	Explanada Tecate, Navojoa, Mexico	
113	Win	97–15–1	Gustavo Octavio Castro	UD	10	Apr 15, 2011	39 years, 252 days	Cancha Municipal, Navojoa, Mexico	
112	Win	96–15–1	Matt Vanda	UD	10	Feb 18, 2011	39 years, 196 days	Gimnasio Salvador Mendoza, Navojoa, Mexico	
111	Win	95–15–1	Esteban Camou	RTD	4 (10)	Dec 17, 2010	39 years, 133 days	Explanada Tecate, Navojoa, Mexico	
110	Win	94–15–1	Juergen Hartenstein	TKO	2 (12), 2:25	Sep 17, 2010	39 years, 42 days	Forum del Mayo, Navojoa, Mexico	
109	Win	93–15–1	Taronze Washington	UD	6	Jul 15, 2010	38 years, 343 days	Don Haskins Center, El Paso, Texas, US	
108	Loss	92–15–1	Héctor Camacho Jr.	SD	10	Oct 30, 2009	38 years, 85 days	Don Haskins Center, El Paso, Texas, US	
107	Draw	92–14–1	Héctor Camacho	SD	8	May 9, 2009	37 years, 276 days	DoubleTree Hotel, Orlando, Florida, US	
106	Loss	92–14	Marcos Reyes	MD	12	Mar 21, 2009	37 years, 227 days	Gimnasio Rodrigo M. Quevedo, Chihuahua, Mexico	For vacant WBC FECOMBOX middleweight title
105	Loss	92–13	Saúl Román	RTD	8 (10), 3:00	Nov 8, 2008	37 years, 94 days	Auditorio Municipal, Tijuana, Mexico	
104	Win	92–12	Alejandro García	KO	1 (10), 1:48	Jun 21, 2008	36 years, 320 days	Auditorio Municipal, Tijuana, Mexico	
103	Loss	91–12	Matthew Macklin	PTS	10	Mar 22, 2008	36 years, 229 days	National Stadium, Dublin, Ireland	
102	Loss	91–11	Amin Asikainen	TKO	7 (10), 0:56	Feb 1, 2008	36 years, 179 days	Toolo Sports Hall, Helsinki, Finland	
101	Win	91–10	Fernando Vela	TKO	5 (10), 1:36	Nov 30, 2007	36 years, 116 days	Jacob Brown Auditorium, Brownsville, Texas, US	
100	Win	90–10	Norberto Bravo	UD	10	Aug 31, 2007	36 years, 25 days	Casino Del Sol, Tucson, Arizona, US	Won vacant IBA junior middleweight title
99	Win	89–10	Billy Lyell	UD	10	Jun 15, 2007	35 years, 313 days	Chevrolet Centre, Youngstown, Ohio, US	
98	Loss	88–10	Eromosele Albert	UD	10	May 2, 2007	35 years, 269 days	Mahi Temple Shrine Auditorium, Miami, Florida, US	
97	Loss	88–9	John Duddy	UD	12	Sep 29, 2006	35 years, 54 days	Madison Square Garden, New York City, New York, US	For IBA middleweight title
96	Win	88–8	Miguel Hernandez	RTD	5 (10), 3:00	Jul 15, 2006	34 years, 343 days	Fifth Third Ballpark, Comstock Park, Michigan, US	
95	Win	87–8	Esteban Camou	TKO	6 (12), 1:34	Sep 30, 2005	34 years, 55 days	Explanada Tecate, Navojoa, Mexico	
94	Loss	86–8	Matt Vanda	SD	12	Jun 24, 2005	33 years, 322 days	Target Center, Minneapolis, Minnesota, US	For vacant IBA Americas junior middleweight title
93	Win	86–7	Rigoberto Placencia	KO	2 (12)	Apr 7, 2005	33 years, 244 days	Hilton Convention Center, Burbank, California, US	
92	Loss	85–7	Eric Regan	UD	12	Jan 21, 2005	33 years, 168 days	Feather Falls Casino, Oroville, California, US	For IBA Continental middleweight title
91	Win	85–6	Raul Munoz	UD	8	Nov 6, 2004	33 years, 92 days	Glendale Arena, Glendale, Arizona, US	
90	Win	84–6	Gabriel Holguin	MD	10	Oct 15, 2004	33 years, 70 days	Casino Del Sol, Tucson, Arizona, US	Won vacant WBC Mundo Hispano middleweight title
89	Win	83–6	Andres Pacheco	SD	10	Jul 9, 2004	32 years, 338 days	El Paso Convention Center, El Paso, Texas, US	
88	Win	82–6	Anthony Shuler	TKO	1 (12), 1:16	May 8, 2004	32 years, 276 days	Dodge Theater, Phoenix, Arizona, US	Won vacant IBA junior middleweight title
87	Win	81–6	Dumont Welliver	SD	10	Mar 26, 2004	32 years, 233 days	Dodge Theater, Phoenix, Arizona, US	
86	Loss	80–6	Oscar De La Hoya	TKO	7 (12), 2:54	May 3, 2003	31 years, 270 days	Mandalay Bay Resort & Casino, Las Vegas, Nevada, US	For WBA (Unified), WBC, IBA, and The Ring light middleweight titles
85	Win	80–5	George Klinesmith	KO	2 (10), 1:57	Nov 15, 2002	31 years, 101 days	Laredo Entertainment Center, Laredo, Texas, US	
84	Loss	79–5	Daniel Santos	TKO	11 (12), 1:36	Mar 16, 2002	30 years, 222 days	Bally's Las Vegas, Las Vegas, Nevada, US	For vacant WBO junior middleweight title
83	Win	79–4	Roni Martinez	TKO	5 (10)	Sep 30, 2001	30 years, 55 days	Grand Victoria Casino, Rising Sun, Indiana, US	
82	Win	78–4	Chris Sande	UD	10	Jun 16, 2001	29 years, 314 days	Centro de Usos Multiples, Hermosillo, Mexico	
81	Win	77–4	Tony Menefee	TKO	4 (10), 3:00	Feb 25, 2001	29 years, 203 days	Greyhound Park, Phoenix, Arizona, US	
80	Win	76–4	Rob Bleakley	TKO	4 (10), 0:51	Nov 19, 2000	29 years, 105 days	Midnight Rodeo, Phoenix, Arizona, US	
79	Win	75–4	Tony Ayala Jr.	RTD	8 (10), 3:00	Jul 28, 2000	28 years, 357 days	Freeman Coliseum, San Antonio, Texas, US	
78	Loss	74–4	Oba Carr	RTD	8 (10), 3:00	Mar 4, 2000	28 years, 211 days	Mandalay Bay Resort & Casino, Las Vegas, Nevada, US	
77	Win	74–3	Rudy Lovato	TKO	5 (10), 3:00	Nov 20, 1999	28 years, 106 days	Paradise Casino, Yuma, Arizona, US	
76	Win	73–3	Ronald Weaver	UD	10	Jun 26, 1999	27 years, 324 days	Mandalay Bay Resort & Casino, Las Vegas, Nevada, US	
75	Loss	72–3	Fernando Vargas	RTD	7 (12), 3:00	Dec 12, 1998	27 years, 128 days	Trump Taj Mahal, Atlantic City, New Jersey, US	Lost IBF junior middleweight title
74	Win	72–2	Larry Barnes	RTD	3 (12), 3:00	Sep 18, 1998	27 years, 43 days	Thomas & Mack Center, Las Vegas, Nevada, US	Retained IBF junior middleweight title
73	Win	71–2	Pedro Ortega	TKO	11 (12), 1:52	Jun 5, 1998	26 years, 303 days	Auditorio Municipal, Tijuana, Mexico	Retained IBF junior middleweight title
72	Win	70–2	Anthony Stephens	RTD	3 (12), 3:00	Mar 23, 1998	26 years, 229 days	Foxwoods Resort, Mashantucket, Connecticut, US	Retained IBF junior middleweight title
71	Win	69–2	Raúl Márquez	TKO	8 (12), 2:29	Dec 6, 1997	26 years, 122 days	Caesars Hotel & Casino, Atlantic City, New Jersey, US	Won IBF junior middleweight title
70	Win	68–2	Verdell Smith	PTS	10	Jul 11, 1997	25 years, 339 days	Memorial Auditorium, Sacramento, California, US	
69	Win	67–2	Chris Sande	UD	10	Jun 2, 1997	25 years, 300 days	Tijuana, Mexico	
68	Win	66–2	Rito Ruvalcaba	TKO	5 (?)	Feb 21, 1997	25 years, 199 days	Tijuana, Mexico	
67	Win	65–2	Fidel Avendano	TKO	2 (10)	Nov 29, 1996	25 years, 115 days	Tijuana, Mexico	
66	Loss	64–2	José Luis López	RTD	5 (12), 3:00	Oct 6, 1996	25 years, 61 days	Sports Arena, Los Angeles, California, US	For WBO welterweight title
65	Win	64–1	Ray Collins	PTS	12	Mar 4, 1996	24 years, 211 days	Great Western Forum, Inglewood, California, US	Retained WBO-NABO light middleweight title
64	Win	63–1	Francisco Javier Altamirano	TKO	8 (10)	Dec 8, 1995	24 years, 124 days	Olympic Auditorium, Los Angeles, California, US	
63	Win	62–1	Anthony Jones	KO	2 (10), 1:45	Nov 4, 1995	24 years, 90 days	Caesars Palace, Las Vegas, Nevada, US	
62	Win	61–1	Manuel Rojas	TKO	1 (?)	Oct 9, 1995	24 years, 64 days	Auditorio Municipal, Tijuana, Mexico	
61	Win	60–1	Genaro León	TKO	3 (12)	Aug 7, 1995	24 years, 1 day	Tijuana, Mexico	Retained WBO-NABO light middleweight title
60	Win	59–1	Heath Todd	TKO	3 (10), 2:20	Jun 19, 1995	23 years, 317 days	Olympic Auditorium, Los Angeles, California, US	
59	Win	58–1	Young Dick Tiger	UD	10	Apr 6, 1995	23 years, 243 days	Olympic Auditorium, Los Angeles, California, US	
58	Win	57–1	Jerry Horne	TKO	4 (12), 1:03	Feb 16, 1995	23 years, 194 days	Olympic Auditorium, Los Angeles, California, US	Won WBO-NABO light middleweight title
57	Loss	56–1	Félix Trinidad	TKO	4 (12), 2:41	Sep 17, 1994	23 years, 42 days	MGM Grand, Grand Garden Arena, Las Vegas, Nevada, US	For IBF welterweight title
56	Win	56–0	Anthony Ivory	TKO	9 (10)	Jul 27, 1994	22 years, 355 days	Tijuana, Mexico	
55	Win	55–0	Jorge Vaca	TKO	2 (10)	Feb 16, 1994	22 years, 194 days	Tijuana, Mexico	
54	Win	54–0	Floyd Williams	KO	4 (10), 1:43	Dec 4, 1993	22 years, 120 days	Reno-Sparks Convention Center, Reno, Nevada, US	
53	Win	53–0	Anthony Ivory	UD	10	Nov 12, 1993	22 years, 98 days	Tijuana, Mexico	
52	Win	52–0	Griffin Goleman	KO	1 (10), 2:55	Aug 27, 1993	22 years, 21 days	Arco Arena, Sacramento, Texas, US	
51	Win	51–0	Ricky Stoner	TKO	7 (?)	Jul 24, 1993	21 years, 352 days	Houston, Texas, US	
50	Win	50–0	Louis Howard	KO	8 (?)	Jun 10, 1993	21 years, 308 days	Tijuana, Mexico	
49	Win	49–0	Ricky Lehman	KO	3 (?)	May 21, 1993	21 years, 288 days	Navojoa, Mexico	
48	Win	48–0	David Taylor	TKO	8 (?)	Mar 12, 1993	21 years, 218 days	Navojoa, Mexico	
47	Win	47–0	Steve Barreras	TKO	2 (?)	Jan 29, 1993	21 years, 176 days	Navojoa, Mexico	
46	Win	46–0	William Hernandez	KO	1 (?)	Dec 4, 1992	21 years, 120 days	Tijuana, Mexico	
45	Win	45–0	Oscar Ponce	TKO	7 (?)	Oct 17, 1992	21 years, 72 days	Jai Alai Fronton, Miami, Florida	
44	Win	44–0	Luciano Torres	KO	1 (10)	Aug 26, 1992	21 years, 20 days	Tijuana, Mexico	
43	Win	43–0	Roger Turner	MD	12	Jun 19, 1992	20 years, 318 days	Caesars Palace, Las Vegas, Nevada, US	Won WBC-NABF welterweight title
42	Win	42–0	Samuel Martinez	TKO	5 (12), 2:39	May 2, 1992	20 years, 270 days	Bally's Hotel & Casino, Ziegfeld Theatre, Reno, Nevada, US	Retained Mexico welterweight title
41	Win	41–0	Ultiminio Martinez	KO	3 (10)	Apr 4, 1992	20 years, 242 days	Navojoa, Mexico	
40	Win	40–0	Julian Benitez	KO	1 (12)	Mar 2, 1992	20 years, 209 days	Tijuana, Mexico	Retained Mexico welterweight title
39	Win	39–0	Greg Dickson	KO	2 (?)	Nov 11, 1991	20 years, 97 days	Tijuana, Mexico	
38	Win	38–0	Frankie Davis	TKO	4 (10)	Oct 5, 1991	20 years, 60 days	Reno-Sparks Convention Center, Reno, Nevada, US	
37	Win	37–0	Jose Luis Bedolla	TKO	3 (12)	Aug 10, 1991	20 years, 4 days	Navojoa, Mexico	Retained Mexico welterweight title
36	Win	36–0	Jerry Horne	TKO	2 (?)	Jul 8, 1991	19 years, 336 days	Tijuana, Mexico	
35	Win	35–0	Jesus Cardenas	KO	7 (12)	May 24, 1991	19 years, 291 days	Estadio Ciclon Echavaria, Navojoa, Mexico	Won Mexico welterweight title
34	Win	34–0	Rey Morales	KO	6 (10)	Mar 8, 1991	19 years, 214 days	Navojoa, Mexico	
33	Win	33–0	Roman Nunez	TKO	3 (?)	Feb 4, 1991	19 years, 182 days	Tijuana, Mexico	
32	Win	32–0	Luis Francisco Perez	TKO	4 (10)	Dec 10, 1990	19 years, 126 days	Tijuana, Mexico	Stopped on cuts
31	Win	31–0	Martin Quiroz	PTS	10	Nov 24, 1990	19 years, 110 days	Navojoa, Mexico	
30	Win	30–0	Victor Lozoya	KO	3 (?)	Sep 28, 1990	19 years, 53 days	Navojoa, Mexico	
29	Win	29–0	Julian Benitez	KO	8 (?)	Aug 20, 1990	19 years, 14 days	Tijuana, Mexico	
28	Win	28–0	Luis Mora	UD	10	May 7, 1990	18 years, 274 days	Tijuana, Mexico	
27	Win	27–0	Jorge Hernandez	KO	2 (?)	May 4, 1990	18 years, 271 days	Tijuana, Mexico	
26	Win	26–0	Manuel Ramos	KO	4 (?)	Mar 12, 1990	18 years, 218 days	Tijuana, Mexico	
25	Win	25–0	Jesus Ramirez	KO	2 (10)	Feb 12, 1990	18 years, 190 days	Tijuana, Mexico	
24	Win	24–0	Federico Renteria	KO	2 (?)	Dec 15, 1989	18 years, 131 days	Navojoa, Mexico	
23	Win	23–0	Corona Dominguez	KO	2 (?)	Oct 30, 1989	18 years, 85 days	Tijuana, Mexico	
22	Win	22–0	Santana Yanez	TKO	4 (?)	Sep 29, 1989	18 years, 54 days	Navojoa, Mexico	
21	Win	21–0	Martin Contreras	TKO	5 (?)	Aug 14, 1989	18 years, 8 days	Auditorio Municipal, Tijuana, Mexico	
20	Win	20–0	Antonio Martinez	KO	3 (?)	Jun 16, 1989	17 years, 314 days	Navojoa, Mexico	
19	Win	19–0	Rigoberto Garcia	TKO	7 (?)	Apr 24, 1989	17 years, 261 days	Tijuana, Mexico	
18	Win	18–0	David Lopez	TKO	8 (10)	Apr 7, 1989	17 years, 244 days	Navojoa, Mexico	
17	Win	17–0	Rosario Guerrero	KO	4 (?)	Mar 13, 1989	17 years, 219 days	Auditorio Municipal, Tijuana, Mexico	
16	Win	16–0	David Lopez	PTS	12	Dec 2, 1988	17 years, 118 days	Navojoa, Mexico	
15	Win	15–0	Jose Lopez	TKO	6 (?)	Nov 7, 1988	17 years, 93 days	Tijuana, Mexico	
14	Win	14–0	Sergio Vacasehua	PTS	10	Oct 14, 1988	17 years, 69 days	Navojoa, Mexico	
13	Win	13–0	Luis Rodriguez	KO	4 (?)	Aug 22, 1988	17 years, 16 days	Tijuana, Mexico	
12	Win	12–0	Jose Lopez	TKO	8 (10)	Jul 11, 1988	16 years, 340 days	Tijuana, Mexico	
11	Win	11–0	Luis Garcia	KO	4 (8)	Jun 20, 1988	16 years, 319 days	Tijuana, Mexico	
10	Win	10–0	Jorge Ahumada	KO	1 (?)	Apr 19, 1988	16 years, 257 days	Tijuana, Mexico	
9	Win	9–0	Gaby Vega	KO	1 (?)	Apr 1, 1988	16 years, 239 days	Navojoa, Mexico	
8	Win	8–0	Heriberto Ruiz	KO	2 (?)	Mar 4, 1988	16 years, 211 days	Navojoa, Mexico	
7	Win	7–0	Segio Garcia	KO	1 (?)	Feb 19, 1988	16 years, 197 days	Navojoa, Mexico	
6	Win	6–0	Sebastian Mendez	KO	2 (?)	Jan 10, 1988	16 years, 157 days	Navojoa, Mexico	
5	Win	5–0	Paulino Gasca	KO	1 (?)	Dec 20, 1987	16 years, 136 days	Tijuana, Mexico	
4	Win	4–0	Miguel Ayala	KO	1 (?)	Dec 13, 1987	16 years, 129 days	Navojoa, Mexico	
3	Win	3–0	Rene Flores	KO	3 (4)	Nov 23, 1987	16 years, 109 days	Navojoa, Mexico	
2	Win	2–0	Roberto Lopez	KO	2 (4)	Nov 12, 1987	16 years, 98 days	Huatabampo, Mexico	
1	Win	1–0	Gaby Vega	KO	1 (6)	Jul 11, 1987	15 years, 339 days	Ciudad Obregon, Mexico	

== Pay-per-view bouts ==
Date	Fight	Billing	Buys	Network
May 3, 2003	De La Hoya vs. Campas	Night of Champions	350,000	HBO

== See also ==
- List of IBF world champions
- List of Mexican boxing world champions

Sporting positions
Regional boxing titles
Preceded by Raúl Márquez	IBF light middleweight champion 6 December 1997 – 12 December 1998	Succeeded by Fernando Vargas
