= Sébastien Demers =

Canadian boxer

Personal information
- Nickname: Double Trouble
- Born: 24 December 1979 (age 46) St. Hyacinthe, Quebec, Canada
- Weight: Super welterweight; Middleweight; Super middleweight

Boxing career
- Stance: Orthodox

Boxing record
- Total fights: 37
- Wins: 31
- Win by KO: 11
- Losses: 6

Sébastien Demers (born 24 December 1979) is a Canadian former professional boxer who competed from 2004 to 2013 and challenged for the International Boxing Federation middleweight title in 2007.

== Professional career ==
Demers is a former Canadian and IBF International middleweight title champion.

Demers then faced Walid Smichet for the Canadian title and IBF International middleweight titles. Demers had just been beaten for the first time in his career after facing Arthur Abraham for the IBF middleweight title in Germany.

Prefight, Smichet had predicted that he would knockout Demers within eight rounds. Smichet was initially the aggressor and pushed forward relentlessly to take Demers out of his rhythm; however he lost momentum towards the end of the fight and Demers' superior technique pulled him through. Demers won a clear points verdict, however, the decision was met with a chorus of boos with commentators stating that the fight was much closer than the score cards suggested with Demers just nicking many of the rounds. Demers stated "I thought I won the rounds, but closely!".

On 5 November 2011 Demers lost to Allan Green in Quebec City. He also lost to James Degale in May 17, 2013 at Quebec, Canada.<

In April 5, 2008, in a middleweight category, he defeated Matt Vanda in a 12th round fight they had.

== Professional boxing record ==
37 fights	31 wins	6 losses
By knockout	11	4
By decision	20	2

No.	Result	Record	Opponent	Type	Round, time	Date	Location	Notes
37	Loss	31–6	(United Kingdom) James DeGale	KO	2 (8), 1:58	17 May 2013	Casino du Lac-Leamy, Gatineau, Quebec, Canada	
36	Loss	31–5	(United States) Allan Green	UD	10	5 Nov 2011	Colisée Pepsi, Quebec City, Quebec, Canada	
35	Loss	31–4	(Canada) Renan St-Juste	KO	2 (12), 0:54	3 Dec 2010	Bell Centre, Montreal, Quebec, Canada	For vacant WBO–NABO super middleweight title
34	Loss	31–3	(United States) Brian Vera	TKO	3 (10), 1:57	11 Jun 2010	Uniprix Stadium, Montreal, Quebec, Canada	
33	Win	31–2	(United States) William Joppy	MD	10	6 Mar 2010	Montreal Casino, Montreal, Quebec, Canada	
32	Win	30–2	(Canada) Nicholson Poulard	UD	12	7 Nov 2009	Montreal Casino, Montreal, Quebec, Canada	Won vacant NABF super middleweight title
31	Win	29–2	(United States) Jose Spearman	KO	1 (8), 1:18	25 Sep 2009	Bell Centre, Montreal, Quebec, Canada	
30	Win	28–2	(Mexico) Alfredo Contreras	UD	8	6 Jun 2009	Montreal Casino, Montreal, Quebec, Canada	
29	Win	27–2	(Canada) Martin Berthiaume	RTD	5 (10), 3:00	7 Mar 2009	Montreal Casino, Montreal, Quebec, Canada	
28	Win	26–2	(United States) Donny McCrary	UD	10	29 Nov 2008	Montreal Casino, Montreal, Quebec, Canada	
27	Loss	25–2	(Colombia) Dionisio Miranda	SD	10	1 Aug 2008	Gare Windsor Salle des Pas Perdus, Montreal, Quebec, Canada	For vacant NABA middleweight title
26	Win	25–1	(United States) Sam Hill	UD	8	6 Jun 2008	Uniprix Stadium, Montreal, Quebec, Canada	
25	Win	24–1	(United States) Matt Vanda	UD	12	5 Apr 2008	Montreal Casino, Montreal, Quebec, Canada	Retained IBF International middleweight title
24	Win	23–1	(United States) Thomas Brown	UD	8	11 Jan 2008	(United States) Hard Rock Live, Hollywood, Florida, U.S.	
23	Win	22–1	(Brazil) Mohammad Said Salem	UD	12	1 Dec 2007	Montreal Casino, Montreal, Quebec, Canada	Retained IBF International middleweight title
22	Win	21–1	(Tunisia) Walid Smichet	UD	12	15 Sep 2007	Montreal Casino, Montreal, Quebec, Canada	Retained IBF International middleweight title; Won Canada middleweight title
21	Loss	20–1	(Germany) Arthur Abraham	KO	3 (12), 2:57	26 May 2007	Jako Arena, Bamberg, Germany	For IBF middleweight title
20	Win	20–0	(Canada) Ian MacKillop	TKO	3 (10), 2:00	10 Feb 2007	Montreal Casino, Montreal, Quebec, Canada	
19	Win	19–0	(Canada) Ian MacKillop	UD	12	25 Nov 2006	Palais des Sports Léopold-Drolet, Sherbrooke, Quebec, Canada	Won vacant IBF International middleweight title
18	Win	18–0	(Canada) Stephane Desormiers	UD	10	30 Sep 2006	Montreal Casino, Montreal, Quebec, Canada	Retained Canada light middleweight title
17	Win	17–0	(Barbados) Christopher Henry	UD	10	13 Jul 2006	Le Mirage, Saint-Leonard, Quebec, Canada	
16	Win	16–0	(United States) Sherwin Davis	TKO	7 (10), 3:00	24 May 2006	Métropolis, Montreal, Quebec, Canada	
15	Win	15–0	(Senegal) Mamadou Thiam	TKO	6 (12), 3:00	11 Mar 2006	Montreal Casino, Montreal, Quebec, Canada	
14	Win	14–0	(Venezuela) Elio Ortiz	TKO	4 (10), 3:00	10 Dec 2005	Montreal Casino, Montreal, Quebec, Canada	
13	Win	13–0	(Brazil) Luiz Augusto Dos Santos	UD	8	19 Nov 2005	Université, Sherbrooke, Quebec, Canada	
12	Win	12–0	(United States) Calvin Shakir	TKO	2 (8), 3:00	29 Oct 2005	Casino du Lac-Leamy, Gatineau, Quebec, Canada	
11	Win	11–0	(Canada) Ian MacKillop	UD	10	10 Sep 2005	Montreal Casino, Montreal, Quebec, Canada	Retained Canada light middleweight title
10	Win	10–0	(Canada) Claudio Ortiz	UD	10	18 Jun 2005	Bell Centre, Montreal, Quebec, Canada	Won vacant Canada light middleweight title
9	Win	9–0	(United States) Verdell Smith	UD	6	16 Apr 2005	Le Colibri, Victoriaville, Quebec, Canada	
8	Win	8–0	(United States) Sammy Sparkman	UD	6	12 Mar 2005	Montreal Casino, Montreal, Quebec, Canada	
7	Win	7–0	(Venezuela) Presente Brito	TKO	3 (6), 3:00	26 Feb 2005	Casino du Lac-Leamy, Gatineau, Quebec, Canada	
6	Win	6–0	(United States) Anthony Ivory	UD	6	12 Feb 2005	Montreal Casino, Montreal, Quebec, Canada	
5	Win	5–0	(United States) Aundalen Sloan	UD	6	17 Dec 2004	Bell Centre, Montreal, Quebec, Canada	
4	Win	4–0	(Canada) Greg Bazile	UD	6	1 Dec 2004	Club Soda, Montreal, Quebec, Canada	
3	Win	3–0	(Dominican Republic) Felix Vargas	TKO	3 (4), 1:45	13 Nov 2004	Montreal Casino, Montreal, Quebec, Canada	
2	Win	2–0	(Canada) Darren Kenny	TKO	2 (4), 1:57	3 Nov 2004	Club Soda, Montreal, Quebec, Canada	
1	Win	1–0	(United States) John Vaughan	TKO	1 (4), 1:13	9 Oct 2004	Montreal Casino, Montreal, Quebec, Canada	
