= Dale Youth =

Dale Youth may refer to:

- Don Dale Youth Detention Centre, a facility for youth detention in Berrimah, Northern Territory, Australia
- Dale Youth boxing club, an amateur boxing club in London, England

== See also ==
- Dale Young (politician), American politician
- C. Dale Young (born 1969), American poet and writer
