= Anthony Bonsante =

American boxer

Personal information
- Nickname: The Bullet
- Born: Anthony James Bonsante; October 28, 1970 (age 55) Crosby, Minnesota, U.S.
- Height: 5 ft 9 in (175 cm)
- Weight: Middleweight; Super middleweight

Boxing career
- Stance: Orthodox

Boxing record
- Total fights: 50
- Wins: 34
- Win by KO: 18
- Losses: 13
- Draws: 3

Anthony "The Bullet" Bonsante (born October 28, 1970) is a professional boxer and competitor on reality TV show The Contender. He also works overnight as a supervisor at a distribution center.

== Personal life ==
Bonsante is a father of two children.

== Boxing career ==
=== On TV's "The Contender" ===
He was a contestant on reality TV show The Contender, shortly before which he fought future contestant Peter Manfredo and lost. That fight was Manfredo's first defence of the WBO and NABA Light Middleweight Titles. Bonsante had previously won a fight for the vacant IBU Super Middleweight Title.

On the show, he was placed on the West Coast team and fought Brent Cooper in the sixth First Round fight. He won in his characteristic aggressive style. However, he was meant to fight Jimmy Lange, and an argument ensued over his choosing not to do so - Ishe Smith in particular become infuriated at his conduct. Tarick Salmaci was the only boxer to accept that he had fought well.

After running into an uppercut from Jesse Brinkley in the quarter finals despite having had the upper hand with his characteristically aggressive boxing style was knocked into a daze, and found himself flat on the canvas. His feud with Ishe continued as they fought in a Fans Favourite Fight on finals night - trying an illegal move on him before going on to lose.

Bonsante fought a rematch with Jesse Brinkley on The Contender Rematch Reality Show. Though the ringside announcers gave the fight to Bonsante, the judges awarded the victory to Brinkley.

=== After "The Contender" ===
In July 2006, he was beaten by super middleweight prospect Allan Green on ESPN.

He injected new life in his career on January 12, 2007, with a ten-round unanimous decision win over archrival Matt Vanda for the Minnesota state middleweight title and vacant IBA Americas belt, before a big crowd of 8,872 at the Target Center in Minneapolis. Bonsante dropped Vanda in the tenth on the way to a 98–92, 98–91, 98–91 win. He lost a technical decision to John Duddy on March 16 at Madison Square Garden, after referee Steve Smoger judged him unable to continue after the ninth round due to a cut from an earlier accidental headbutt.

On July 31, 2008, Bonsante lost a 1st-round KO to Adonis Stevenson when Bonsante was caught with a sharp left just 46 seconds into the first round. Bonsante went down on his back, with his eyes shut. Veteran and WBC appointed referee (Gerry Bolen) began counting but stopped at a count of six as it appeared that Bonsante had been knocked out. As Bolen was waiving off the fight, Bonsante rapidly got up and appeared to be completely alert. Nonetheless, the referee refused to allow the fight to continue. ESPN boxing analyst Teddy Atlas commented that Bonsante may have been playing possum by pretending to be knocked out, but miscalculated the referee's reaction.

On January 20, 2009, it was announced that Bonsante would defend his Minnesota middleweight title against challenger Andy Kolle at Grand Casino Hinckley on March 27 of the same year. Andy Kolle wins by a TKO in round 3 after which Anthony Bonsante announces retirement from the sport.

== Professional boxing record ==
50 fights	34 wins	13 losses
By knockout	18	5
By decision	15	8
By disqualification	1	0
Draws	3	

No.	Result	Record	Opponent	Type	Round, Time	Date	Location	Notes
50	Loss	34–13–3	Yori Boy Campas	DQ	6 (10)	Jan 23, 2016	Civic Center, Butte, Montana, U.S.	
49	Win	34–12–3	Daniel Gonzales	UD	8	Sep 26, 2015	Flathead Country Fairgrounds, Kalispell, Montana, U.S.	
48	Win	33–12–3	Sam Hill	UD	6	May 31, 2014	Sports Center, Vadnais Heights, Minnesota, U.S.	
47	Loss	32–12–3	Robert Kliewer	SD	8	Dec 18, 2010	Target Center, Minneapolis, Minnesota, U.S.	
46	Loss	32–11–3	Andy Kolle	TKO	3 (10), 1:37	Mar 28, 2009	Grand Casino, Honckley, Minnesota, U.S.	For USA Minnesota State middleweight title
45	Win	32–10–3	Carl Daniels	UD	10	Sep 20, 2008	Treasure Island Casino, Red Wing, Minnesota, U.S.	
44	Loss	31–10–3	Adonis Stevenson	KO	1 (12), 0:46	Aug 1, 2008	Gare Windsor Salle des Pas Perdus, Montreal, Canada	For WBC Continental Americas super-middleweight title
43	Win	31–9–3	Ted Muller	RTD	5 (8), 3:00	Jun 6, 2008	Grand Casino, Hinckley, Minnesota, U.S.	
42	Win	30–9–3	Kendall Gould	UD	8	Aug 24, 2007	Grand Casino, Hinckley, Minnesota, U.S	
41	Loss	29–9–3	John Duddy	TD	9 (12) 3:00	Mar 16, 2007	Madison Square Garden, New York City, New York, U.S.	For IBA and WBC Continental Americas middleweight titles
40	Win	29–8–3	Matt Vanda	UD	10	Jan 12, 2007	Target Center, Minneapolis, Minnesota, U.S.	Retained USA Minnesota State middleweight title; Won vacant IBA Americas middleweight title
39	Win	28–8–3	Troy Lowry	TKO	8 (10), 3:00	Nov 17, 2006	Target Center, Minneapolis, Minnesota, U.S.	Won vacant USA Minnesota State middleweight title
38	Win	27–8–3	Larry Borthers	KO	4 (6), 2:34	Oct 7, 2006	Patriot Center - George Mason University, Fairfax, Virginia, U.S.	
37	Loss	26–8–3	Allan Green	TKO	5 (10), 2:37	Jul 21, 2006	Million Dollar Elm Casino, Tulsa, Oklahoma, U.S.	
36	Loss	26–7–3	Jesse Brinkley	UD	5	Oct 15, 2005	Staples Center, Los Angeles, California, U.S.	The Contender Series (2005)
35	Loss	26–6–3	Ishe Smith	UD	5	May 24, 2005	Caesars Palace, Paradise, Nevada, U.S.	The Contender Series (2005)
34	Loss	26–5–3	Jesse Brinkley	TKO	5 (5), 2:24	Sep 21, 2004	Pasadena, California, U.S.	The Contender Series (2005)
33	Win	26–4–3	Brent Cooper	TKO	3 (5), 0:38	Sep 2, 2004	Pasadena, California, U.S.	The Contender Series (2005)
32	Loss	25–4–3	Peter Manfredo Jr.	UD	12	May 14, 2004	Convention Center, Providence, Rhode Island, U.S.	For WBO–NABO junior-middleweight title
31	Win	25–3–3	Reggie Strickland	UD	8	Sep 6, 2003	Sport's Cafe, Fridley, Minnesota, U.S.	
30	Win	24–3–3	Roni Martinez	TKO	3 (10)	Aug 23, 2003	Canterbury Downs Racetrack, Shakopee, Minnesota, U.S.	Corner Retirement
29	Win	23–3–3	Tony Ayala Jr.	TKO	11 (12), 1:32	Apr 25, 2003	Thunderbird Wold West Casino, Norman, Oklahoma, U.S.	Won vacant IBA super-middleweight title
28	Win	22–3–3	Marris Virgil	TKO	3 (8), 3:00	Apr 11, 2003	Grand Casino, Hinckley, Minnesota, U.S.	
27	Win	21–3–3	Donnie Penelton	UD	8	Mar 15, 2003	Ho-Chunk Casino, Baraboo, Wisconsin, U.S.	
26	Draw	20–3–3	Prince Badi Ajamu	SD	8	Oct 4, 2002	Dover Downs, Dover, Delaware, U.S.	
25	Win	20–3–2	Jonathan Corn	TKO	3 (10), 1:52	Jun 16, 2002	Treasure Island Casino, Red Wing, Minnesota, U.S.	
24	Win	19–3–2	Marris Virgil	TKO	3 (8), 2:22	Jun 7, 2002	Wade Stadium, Duluth, Minnesota, U.S.	
23	Win	18–3–2	Gustavo Alonso Soto	UD	10	Jan 31, 2002	Roy Wilkins Auditorium, Saint Paul, Minnesota, U.S.	
22	Win	17–3–2	Donnie Penelton	UD	8	Oct 26, 2001	Grand Casino, Hinckley, Minnesota, U.S.	
21	Win	16–3–2	Dustin Marshall	TKO	2 (6), 1:15	Jul 28, 2001	Rochester, Minnesota, U.S.	
20	Loss	15–3–2	Tocker Pudwill	UD	8	Jun 1, 2001	Civic Center, Bismarck, North Dakota, U.S.	
19	Win	15–2–2	Billy Mastrangelo	UD	8	Mar 23, 2001	Sportscenter, Owensboro, Kentucky, U.S.	
18	Win	14–2–2	Rob Bleakly	UD	6	Jan 12, 2001	Lucky Star Casino, Concho, Oklahoma, U.S.	
17	Loss	13–2–2	Danny Thomas	TKO	8 (8), 1:12	Sep 2, 1999	Adam's Mark Hotel, Indianapolis, Indiana, U.S.	
16	Win	13–1–2	Manuel Esparza	TKO	6 (8)	Jun 19, 1999	Cuzzy's Bar, Minneapolis, Minnesota, U.S.	
15	Win	12–1–2	Ruben Ruiz	TKO	2 (8)	May 22, 1999	Hyatt Regency Hotel, Minneapolis, Minnesota, U.S.	
14	Win	11–1–2	Rob Bleakly	UD	8	May 9, 1999	Municipal Auditorium, Minot, North Dakota, U.S.	
13	Win	10–1–2	Rico Cason	UD	8	Feb 12, 1999	Hyatt Regency Hotel, Minneapolis, Minnesota, U.S.	
12	Win	9–1–2	Scott Sala	TKO	4 (4), 1:50	Nov 20, 1998	Catfish Bend Casino, Burlington, Iowa, U.S.	
11	Win	8–1–2	Mike Serr	TKO	4 (6)	Nov 13, 1998	Jackpot Junction, Casino, Morton, Minnesota, U.S.	
10	Win	7–1–2	Danny Thomas	PTS	6	Oct 1, 1998	Rochester, Minnesota, U.S.	
9	Win	6–1–2	David Foster	UD	4	Aug 29, 1998	Waterloo, Iowa, U.S.	
8	Win	5–1–2	Richard Wilson	PTS	5	Jun 5, 1998	North Star Casino, Keshena, Wisconsin, U.S.	
7	Win	4–1–2	David Horvath	TKO	2 (?)	Dec 2, 1997	Brooklyn Park, Minnesota, U.S.	
6	Draw	3–1–2	Rhoshii Wells	PTS	4	Oct 10, 1997	Jackpot Junction Casino, Morton, Minnesota, U.S.	
5	Draw	3–1–1	LaVerne Clark	SD	6	Sep 13, 1997	All Seasons Arena, Mandan, North Dakota, U.S.	
4	Loss	3–1	Kingsley Ikeke	PTS	6	Jun 6, 1997	Winnipeg, Manitoba, Canada	
3	Win	3–0	Shawn Stalder	TKO	1 (?)	Mar 28, 1997	Graham Arena, Rochester, Minnesota, U.S.	
2	Win	2–0	Shawn Stalder	TKO	4 (4)	Aug 24, 1996	4 Bears Casino & Lodge, New Town, North Dakota, U.S.	
1	Win	1–0	Pete Flying Horse	TKO	1 (4)	Jun 22, 1996	4 Bears Casino & Lodge, New Town, North Dakota, U.S.	
