= Michi Munoz =

Mexican boxer

Personal information
- Nicknames: The Mexican Sensation; The Matador
- Born: Jorge Michael Muñoz; 3 May 1981 (age 45) León, Guanajuato, Mexico
- Weight: Middleweight

Boxing career
- Stance: Orthodox

Boxing record
- Total fights: 43
- Wins: 28
- Win by KO: 19
- Losses: 14
- Draws: 1
- No contests: 0

Jorge Michael Muñoz (born May 3, 1981), more commonly known as Michi Muñoz, is a Mexican-born American professional boxer.

Munoz is the former NABC light middleweight champion and has been described as one of the hottest prospects to ever come from the Midwest of America.

== Background ==
Munoz was born in León, Guanajuato, Mexico although grew up in Topeka, Kansas, United States. He is one of three boxing brother along with Raul and Alex.

== Career ==
Munoz boxed as an amateur prior to taking a long break from boxing before moving to the professional ranks. Munoz stated "I came back, and I feel more mature, and I feel like my body's more mature.".

Munoz turned professional in June 2004, winning his first fight at Union Station, Kansas City, Missouri, in which Munoz beat American fighter Lance Moody on the undercard of the Jesse Sanders v Donny McCrary fight.

=== NABC light middleweight title ===
Munoz won all of his first 14 fights, 11 inside the distance, before he fought for his first title belt against Joshua Smith. They faced each other for the vacant NABC light middleweight title in August 2006.

Right-handed Munoz injured his right in the early rounds of the fight and had to fight the remainder of the bout using only his left. Despite this setback Munoz took the title belt by a unanimous decision of 80–72 margin on all of the judge's score cards.

=== Joey Gilbert fight ===
Following another two victories Munoz then faced Joey Gilbert, the star of the original series of reality TV boxing show The Contender, for the WBO North American Boxing Organization middleweight championship at Lake Tahoe, Nevada.

Gilbert was originally scheduled to face Cincinnati's Robert Dula who pulled out due to a shoulder injury. Although the fight was to take place at an altitude of 6000 feet at the MontBleu Resort & Casino Munoz still took the fight with just 8 days' notice.

Munoz was the sharper and more aggressive fighter in the early round before showing signs of breathing difficulty as a result of the high altitude. Munoz still pushed the champion Gilbert the full 12 rounds finally losing the fight on points. After the fight Gilbert stated the Munoz was "one of the best fighters I've ever faced".

=== John Duddy fight ===
Munoz returned to the ring the following month to defeat Wisconsin fighter Aundalen Sloan and quickly added another two victories to his record in 2007.

Munoz then fought Irish boxer John Duddy at the Madison Square Garden in New York City on October 10, 2009. Duddy won the fight via unanimous decision.
