= Eromosele Albert =

Nigerian boxer

Personal information
- Nickname: Bad Boy
- Nationality: Nigerian
- Born: Eromosele Albert; 27 May 1974 (age 52) Benin City, Nigeria
- Height: 183 cm (6 ft 0 in)

Boxing career
- Stance: Orthodox

Boxing record
- Total fights: 31
- Wins: 24
- Win by KO: 12
- Losses: 6
- Draws: 1

Eromosele Albert (born 27 July 1974) is a Nigerian former professional boxer. As an amateur, he competed at the 1996 and 2000 Summer Olympics.

== Professional boxing record ==
No.	Result	Record	Opponent	Type	Round, Time	Date	Location	Notes
31	loss	24-6-1	(Australia) Sam Soliman	UD	10	18 Nov 2011	Melbourne Showgrounds, Melbourne, Australia	
30	loss	24-5-1	(Australia) Daniel Geale	UD	10	31 Oct 2011	Derwent Entertainment Centre, Hobart, Australia	
29	win	23-5-1	(Cuba) Lester Gonzalez	TKO		11 Feb 2011	(United States) Magic City Casino, Miami, USA	
28	win	22-5-1	(United States) Joaquin Zamora	TKO		19 Nov 2010	(United States) Magic City Casino, Miami, USA	
27	loss	22-4-1	(United States) Derek Ennis	UD	10	16 Oct 2009	(United States) The Blue Horizon, Philadelphia, USA	
26	loss	22-3-1	(Russia) Zaurbek Baysangurov	UD	10	15 Aug 2009	Dynamo, Grozny, Russia	
25	win	21-3-1	(United States) Germaine Sanders	UD	10	16 Jan 2009	(United States) Mallory Square, Key West, USA	
24	draw	21-3	(Ghana) Ossie Duran	PTS		23 Sep 2008	(United States) Hammerstein Ballroom, New York City, USA	
23	loss	21-2	(United States) James Kirkland	TKO		17 May 2008	(United States) Buffalo Bill's Star Arena, Primm, USA	
22	win	20-2	(Haiti) Daniel Edouard	TKO		20 Jul 2007	(United States) Mahi Temple Shrine Auditorium, Miami, USA	
21	win	19-2	(Mexico) Yori Boy Campas	UD	10	2 May 2007	(United States) Mahi Temple Shrine Auditorium, Miami, USA	
20	win	18-2	(Dominican Republic) Daniel Toribio	TKO		2 Mar 2007	(United States) Ocean Reef Club, Key Largo, USA	
19	win	17-2	(Turkey) Nurhan Süleymanoğlu	UD	10	11 Nov 2006	(United States) Club Cinema, Pompano Beach, USA	
18	win	16-2	(United States) Jeremy Yelton	TKO		23 Sep 2006	(United States) Mallory Square, Key West, USA	
17	win	15-2	(United States) David Banks	UD	10	27 Jun 2006	(United States) Sheraton Miami, Miami, USA	
16	win	14-2	(United States) Marquis McConnell	TKO		10 Jun 2006	(United States) The Venue, Greensboro, USA	
15	win	13-2	(United States) Daniel Neal	UD	10	28 Apr 2006	(United States) DeKalb Events Center, Atlanta, USA	
14	win	12-2	(Dominica) Dorian Beaupierre	MD	10	10 Dec 2005	(United States) Silver Star Hotel & Casino, Choctaw, USA	
