= John Duddy =

Irish boxer and actor (born 1979)

Personal information
- Nickname: Ireland's John Duddy
- Nationality: Irish
- Born: John Francis Duddy; 19 June 1979 (age 47) Derry, Northern Ireland
- Height: 5 ft 11 in (1.80 m)
- Weight: Middleweight

Boxing career
- Reach: 74 in (188 cm)
- Stance: Orthodox

Boxing record
- Total fights: 31
- Wins: 29
- Losses: 2

John Francis Duddy (born 19 June 1979) is an Irish actor and former professional boxer who fought from 2003 to 2010. He challenged once for the vacant WBC Silver middleweight title, losing in his final fight to Julio César Chávez Jr.

== Amateur career ==
As an amateur Duddy fought 130 times, winning 100 of his bouts. Duddy won his first Irish national title at the age of 15 as a Light Middleweight in the Junior Division, later winning Irish titles at the Intermediate and Elite Levels. He represented Ireland at European level and during Olympic qualifiers.

== Professional career ==
=== Debut ===
Duddy turned professional September 2003, and his first fight as a pro was versus Tarek Rashed in the Bronx, New York. He won via first-round knockout. On 22 November, he stopped Jesse Gomez at the Crowne Plaza hotel. His next bout was also at the Crowne Plaza, where he beat Leo Laudat on 21 December but suffered his first knockdown.

=== Early professional fights ===
Duddy began 2004 by stepping up his opponent quality a notch, when he met Ken Hock on 9 January 2004 in Uncasville, Connecticut. Hock had ten victories against four losses and one draw (tie) coming into his bout with Duddy. Hock became the first boxer to go more than one round against Duddy, but still lost by knockout to the Irish prospect in the fourth round. He then experienced his career's longest lay-off, waiting over nine months before his next bout. When he returned, he once again won by first-round knockout, defeating Victor Paz on 30 October at Middletown, New York. Duddy quickly returned to action after that fight, beating William Johnson on 18 November in Manhattan.

Duddy's last fight of 2004 came on 12 December at Brighton Beach, Brooklyn against the then undefeated Glen Dunnings. Dunnings became only the second boxer to go more than one round against Duddy, when he was knocked out in the fifth round. Duddy's first fight of 2005 came on 4 February, when he beat Chuck Orso in White Plains.

=== St Patrick's Day events ===
On 18 March, Duddy fought the undefeated prospect Leonard Pierre as part of an Irish themed "day after Saint Patrick's Day card". This undercard was televised in the United States on ESPN, with Duddy and Pierre fighting the semi-main event of the card, which was headlined by heavyweight Kevin McBride, who later defeated Mike Tyson.

Both the live crowd and the television announcers expected an early knockout in this fight, given that Pierre also had six first-round knockout wins. Duddy proceeded to drop Pierre twice before experienced referee Frank Cappuccino stopped the fight, giving Duddy his seventh first-round knockout, and his ninth consecutive knockout victory.

On 11 June 2005, Duddy was up against Patrick Thompson in Madison Square Garden. Thompson became the third boxer to last the first round, and both fighters boxed to a judge's decision. The score on all three cards was 80–72 in favor of Duddy, who extended his win streak to ten, while his knockout streak ended at nine.

In his next eight fights, Duddy knocked out six opponents, including first round knock outs of both Joseph Brady (17 September 2005) and Shelby Pudwill (16 March 2006). On the undercard of 10 June 2006 Miguel Cotto–Paul Malignaggi Top Rank Pay-Per-View fight, Duddy took on the experienced fighter Alfredo Cuevas, who in 2004 went the 12 round distance with former middleweight champion Jermain Taylor. It was Duddy's eighth fight in less than a year and his third at Madison Square Garden, but he showed no signs of fatigue, fighting Cuevas for 7 rounds before Cuevas retired on his stool with a broken nose and several deep cuts.

His next fight came against Yori Boy Campas, again at Madison Square Garden. Against an opponent with ten times more professional experience, Duddy went the distance, winning in a unanimous decision after 12 rounds. On 16 March 2007, he beat Anthony Bonsante at Madison Square Garden. Duddy won with a unanimous 90–81, 89-82 and 88-83 decision when the fight was stopped after the ninth round by referee Steve Smoger, due to heavy bleeding from Bonsante's forehead caused by an earlier accidental headbutt.

=== Return to Ireland ===
On 14 July 2007, Duddy fought the first of his two scheduled fights in what has been billed as his "Homecoming" to Ireland. In his first at the National Stadium in Dublin, his opponent was Alessio Furlan. Duddy was ruled the winner by TKO with only 10 seconds to go in the 10th and final round. John then went on to defeat Prince Arron in 2 rounds on 20 October in Dublin's National Stadium. He fought Howard Eastman at the King's Hall in Belfast on 8 December. The fight was expected to be his toughest to date. In front of 5,500 supporters, Duddy recorded a ten-round 96-94 points victory.

=== Loss to Lyell ===
On 24 April 2009, Duddy was beaten via ten-round split decision by Billy Lyell, a fighter with seven losses in his twenty-five fights.

=== Rebuilding ===
On 10 October 2009, Duddy made a successful return to the ring against Michi Munoz. Duddy won a unanimous decision. On 23 January 2010, he fought Juan Astorga in Madison Square Garden. He went on to win by way of TKO in the first round, giving Duddy his 18th KO.

Duddy defeated Michael Medina of Monterrey, Mexico via a split decision on 13 March 2010, on the undercard of the Pacquaio/Clottey WBO Welterweight Championship. In his final fight he was unanimously outpointed by Julio César Chávez, Jr. in a fight in San Antonio on 26 June 2010.

== Retirement from boxing ==
Duddy announced his retirement from boxing in a statement on 19 January 2011, after "a great deal of soul-searching". In the statement, Duddy cited a lack of desire, saying, "I no longer have the enthusiasm and willingness to make the sacrifices that are necessary to honor the craft of prizefighting", and stated that his decision is final, scuppering plans for an all-Irish showdown at Foxwoods Resort against Andy Lee. Having concluded his boxing career, Duddy decided to enter the field of acting.

== Acting career ==
Duddy pursued acting mainly in New York City, where the working-class Irishman found an especially warm welcome among working-class New Yorkers and Irish émigrés. Duddy landed roles in short film, web series, and the Off-Broadway stage. Duddy played the title character in the 2011 production of Kid Shamrock, Bobby Cassidy Jr.'s play based on the life of his father, American boxer "Irish" Bobby Cassidy. In 2012, Duddy played the bartender in the Matt Glasson short film Hard Times and portrayed the character Mark Sullivan in the online series The Wronged One (2010-2012, 2016), a revenge-thriller based on a graphic novel. In The Wronged One, Duddy's character appeared in an episode entitled "The Derry Destroyer" in honor of Duddy's boxing nickname. In January 2016, Latino Review reported The Wrong One had the attention of IFC (U.S. TV network), formerly the Independent Film Channel. IFC contemplated featuring the series on the channel's website.

In 2013, Duddy worked in several media. Duddy played a boxer in the music video for the Bon Jovi song "Because We Can," which debuted in January 2013. In the 2013 production of For Love by Irish actress, Laoisa Sexton's play about 3 single women in Dublin, Ireland and the men in their lives, Duddy portrayed all the male characters. Duddy's work in For Love won praise from Backstage and The New York Times. After the 9 March–April 5, 2013 run at New York City's Irish Repertory Theatre, Duddy continued with an Irish tour of For Love in Derry and Belfast in Northern Ireland and Waterford, Dublin and Galway in the Republic of Ireland. For the 2013 film Grudge Match, Duddy helped Robert De Niro train for boxing sequences choreographed by Robert Sale, the film's boxing technical adviser.

His work with Sale and De Niro on Grudge Match led to Duddy's casting in the Roberto Durán biopic Hands of Stone (2016). In September 2013, Sale called Duddy to suggest the actor accept the phone call he was about to get from an unfamiliar number. De Niro himself called to offer Duddy the role of legendary Scottish boxer Ken Buchanan after another actor withdrew from the part. Interviewed by American sports writer Thomas Hauser, Duddy recalled, "Filming Hands of Stone was an incredible experience."

== Professional boxing record ==
31 fights	29 wins	2 losses
By knockout	18	0
By decision	11	2

Key to abbreviations used for results
DQ	Disqualification	RTD	Corner retirement
KO	Knockout	SD	Split decision / split draw
MD	Majority decision / majority draw	TD	Technical decision / technical draw
NC	No contest	TKO	Technical knockout
PTS	Points decision	UD	Unanimous decision / unanimous draw

Boxing record
No.	Result	Record	Opponent	Type	Round(s), time	Date	Location	Notes
31	Loss	29–2	(Mexico) Julio César Chávez, Jr.	UD	12	26 Jun 2010	(United States) Alamodome, San Antonio, Texas	For vacant WBC Silver Middleweight Title
30	Win	29–1	(Mexico) Michael Medina	SD	12	13 Mar 2010	(United States) Cowboys Stadium, Arlington, Texas	
29	Win	28–1	(United States) Juan Astorga	TKO	1 (8), 1:55	23 Jan 2010	(United States) Madison Square Garden, New York City, New York	
28	Win	27–1	(Mexico) Michi Munoz	UD	8	10 Oct 2009	(United States) Madison Square Garden, New York City, New York	
27	Loss	26–1	(United States) Billy Lyell	SD	10	24 Apr 2009	(United States) Prudential Center, Newark, New Jersey	
26	Win	26–0	(United States) Matt Vanda	UD	10	21 Feb 2009	(United States) Madison Square Garden, New York City, New York	
25	Win	25–0	(United States) Charles Howe	UD	10	28 Jun 2008	(United States) BU Castle, Boston, Massachusetts	
24	Win	24–0	(Tunisia) Walid Smichet	MD	10	23 Feb 2008	(United States) Madison Square Garden, New York City, New York	
23	Win	23–0	(Guyana) Howard Eastman	UD	10	8 Dec 2007	(United Kingdom) King's Hall, Belfast, Northern Ireland	
22	Win	22–0	(United Kingdom) Prince Arron	TKO	2 (10), 2:33	20 Oct 2007	(Republic of Ireland) National Stadium, Dublin, Leinster	
21	Win	21–0	(Italy) Alessio Furlan	TKO	10 (10), 2:42	14 Jul 2007	(Republic of Ireland) National Stadium, Dublin, Leinster	
20	Win	20–0	(United States) Dupre Strickland	UD	10	18 May 2007	(United States) Beacon Theatre, New York City, New York	
19	Win	19–0	(United States) Anthony Bonsante	TD	9 (12), 3:00	16 Mar 2007	(United States) Madison Square Garden, New York City, New York	Retained IBA Middleweight title Won WBC Continental Americas title
18	Win	18–0	(Mexico) Yori Boy Campas	UD	12	29 Sep 2006	(United States) Madison Square Garden, New York City, New York	Retained IBA Middleweight Title
17	Win	17–0	(United States) Alfredo Cuevas	RTD	7 (12), 3:00	10 Jun 2006	(United States) Madison Square Garden, New York City, New York	Retained IBA Middleweight title
16	Win	16–0	(United States) Shelby Pudwill	TKO	1 (10), 1:51	16 Mar 2006	(United States) Madison Square Garden, New York City, New York	Won vacant IBA Middleweight title
15	Win	15–0	(Haiti) Julio Jean	UD	10	4 Feb 2006	(United States) BU Castle, Boston, Massachusetts	
14	Win	14–0	(United States) Wilmer Mejia	RTD	3 (8), 3:00	15 Dec 2005	(United States) Seminole Hard Rock Hotel and Casino Hollywood, Hollywood, Florida	
13	Win	13–0	(Canada) Bryon Mackie	TKO	4 (8), 1:32	4 Nov 2005	(United States) Hammerstein Ballroom, New York City, New York	
12	Win	12–0	(United States) Joseph Brady	KO	1 (8), 1:01	17 Sep 2005	(United States) Dana Barros Sports Complex, Mansfield, Massachusetts	
11	Win	11–0	(United States) Pat Coleman	TKO	8 (8), 2:30	22 Jul 2005	(United States) Allstate Arena, Rosemont, Illinois	
10	Win	10–0	(United States) Patrick Thompson	UD	8	11 Jun 2005	(United States) Madison Square Garden, New York City, New York	
9	Win	9–0	(Haiti) Lenord Pierre	TKO	1 (8), 1:23	18 Mar 2005	(United States) Foxwoods Resort Casino, Mashantucket, Connecticut	
8	Win	8–0	(United States) Chuck Orso	KO	1 (8), 1:37	4 Feb 2005	(United States) Westchester County Center, White Plains, New York	
7	Win	7–0	(United States) Glen Dunnings	TKO	5 (6), 1:20	11 Dec 2004	(United States) Atlantic Oceana, Brighton Beach, New York	
6	Win	6–0	(United States) William Johnson	TKO	1 (4), 0:39	18 Nov 2004	(United States) Manhattan Center, New York City, New York	
5	Win	5–0	(United States) Victor Paz	TKO	1 (6), 2:04	30 Nov 2004	(United States) Orange County Fairgrounds, Middletown, New York	
4	Win	4–0	(United States) Ken Hock	TKO	4 (4)	9 Jan 2004	(United States) Mohegan Sun Casino, Uncasville, Connecticut	
3	Win	3–0	(United States) Leo Laudat	TKO	1 (4), 1:48	21 Nov 2003	(United States) Crowne Plaza Hotel, New York City, New York	
2	Win	2–0	(United States) Jesse Gomez	TKO	1 (4)	22 Oct 2003	(United States) Crowne Plaza Hotel, New York City, New York	
1	Win	1–0	(United States) Tarek Rached	TKO	1 (4)	19 Sep 2003	(United States) Jimmy's Bronx Cafe, Bronx, New York	Professional debut

== Personal life ==
Duddy married his long-time girlfriend Graínne Coll in 2009 in their native Derry.

One of Duddy's uncles, named Jackie Duddy, was one of the 14 people killed by British Army Paratroopers, during Bloody Sunday.
