= James DeGale =

British boxer (born 1986)

James DeGale MBE
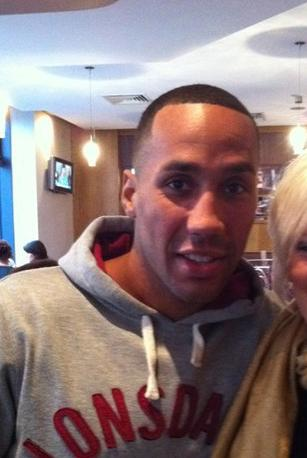
- DeGale in 2011

Personal information
- Nickname: Chunky
- Born: 3 February 1986 (age 40) Hammersmith, West London, England
- Height: 6 ft 1 in (185 cm)
- Weight: Super-middleweight

Boxing career
- Reach: 74 in (188 cm)
- Stance: Southpaw

Boxing record
- Total fights: 29
- Wins: 25
- Win by KO: 15
- Losses: 3
- Draws: 1
Medal record
Men's amateur boxing
Representing Great Britain
Olympic Games
Gold medal – first place	2008 Beijing	Middleweight
Representing England
Commonwealth Games
Bronze medal – third place	2006 Melbourne	Middleweight
Commonwealth Championships
Gold medal – first place	2005 Glasgow	Middleweight
EU Championships
Silver medal – second place	2007 Dublin	Middleweight
Silver medal – second place	2008 Cetniewo	Middleweight

James Frederick DeGale MBE (born 3 February 1986) is a British bare-knuckle boxer and former professional boxer who competed from 2009 to 2019. He held the IBF super-middleweight title twice between 2015 and 2018. At regional level, he held the European and British super-middleweight titles between 2010 and 2012; and challenged once for the Commonwealth title in 2011.

As an amateur, DeGale represented Great Britain at the 2008 Olympics, winning a gold medal in the middleweight division. He also won silver at the 2007 and 2008 EU Championships, and bronze at the 2006 Commonwealth Games. By later becoming IBF champion, he became the first British boxer in history to win both an Olympic gold medal and a professional world title.

== Early life ==
Born to a black Grenadian father and a white English mother, DeGale started amateur boxing at the Trojan club at the age of 10 before moving to Dale Youth boxing club. As a boy he soon acquired the nickname "Chunky", a name that has followed him throughout his career.

== Amateur career ==
The predominantly southpaw Londoner fights as a switch hitter. At the Commonwealth Games 2006 he won Bronze when he lost to Jarrod Fletcher.

Amateur record: 79–16.

DeGale represented Great Britain at the 2008 Summer Olympics in the Middleweight boxing event, winning the gold medal. In the quarter-finals he beat a former Olympic gold medalist from Athens (Bakhtiyar Artayev) and in the semi-final once again beat the late Irishman Darren Sutherland (prior to this latest meeting the boxers had fought five times with Sutherland winning four and DeGale only one). In the final DeGale won a scrappy and bad tempered affair against the Cuban Emilio Correa who was docked two points in the first round for biting DeGale's shoulder.

=== World championships results ===
2007 (as a middleweight)

- Lost to Alfonso Blanco (Venezuela) 13–28

=== Olympic results ===
2008

- Defeated Mohamed Hikal (Egypt) 13–4
- Defeated Shawn Estrada (USA) 11–5
- Defeated Bakhtiyar Artayev (Kazakhstan) 8–3
- Defeated Darren Sutherland (Ireland) 10–3
- Defeated Emilio Correa (Cuba) 16–14

== Professional boxing career ==
On 2 December 2008, he agreed a deal with promoter Frank Warren to become professional along with Frankie Gavin and Billy Joe Saunders. The contract agreed was rumoured to be worth around £1.5 million.

DeGale was appointed Member of the Order of the British Empire (MBE) in the 2009 New Year Honours.

=== Early career ===
On 28 February 2009 DeGale made his professional debut against Vepkhia Tchilaia, winning a points decision by 40–36. DeGale received a mixed reaction from the crowd, who booed him after being taken the distance by his little-known opponent. However, DeGale was also backed by others in attendance, as Tchilaia chose to box extremely defensively. Five more victories followed before DeGale won his first regional championship, the WBA International super-middleweight title, stopping Sam Horton in five rounds. On 18 September 2010, DeGale made the first defence of his title against Carl Dilks, winning by stoppage near the end of the first round.

=== British champion ===
==== DeGale vs. Smith ====
Frank Warren revealed that DeGale would challenge Paul Smith for the British super-middleweight title on Warren's blockbuster event in Liverpool, which was set for 11 December 2010 at the Echo Arena. The bill included fellow Olympians Frankie Gavin and Billy Joe Saunders, as well as Nathan Cleverly and Kell Brook. DeGale went on to defeat Smith via ninth-round stoppage to become the British super-middleweight champion.

==== DeGale vs. Groves ====
On 17 March 2011, Frank Warren announced that DeGale would defend his British title against fellow Dale Youth Boxing Club graduate and Commonwealth champion George Groves at The O2 on 21 May. Groves had previously held a majority decision win over DeGale in the amateurs. DeGale suffered his first professional loss Groves, in what was seen as a very close fight. The judges scored the bout 115–115, 115–114, and 115–114; a majority decision. Groves, who believed he proved many critics wrong, welcomed the idea of a rematch in the future, "I will fight him again. Yeah if everything is all right and it's the right way. But now I have beaten him twice." DeGale had a look of disbelief when the decision was announced.

=== European champion ===
DeGale was scheduled to return to action in September 2011 to challenge Polish boxer Piotr Wilczewski for his European super-middleweight title. DeGale returned on 15 October 2011 to defeat Wilczewski when one judge scored the bout 114–114, and the other two scored it 115–113 in favour of DeGale, giving him the majority decision to win the European title. DeGale started well winning the early rounds. He slowed down his work rate before immediately picking it back up during the sixth and seventh rounds. In February 2012, DeGale signed a sponsorship deal with Bulk Powders sport supplements. DeGale took six months out before fighting Italian boxer Cristian Sanavia on 21 April 2012 and successfully defending his European title in Denmark. DeGale dropped Sanavia 3 times in round 4, forcing the referee stoppage. At the time of stoppage, Degale was ahead on all three judges cards 29–28, 30–27, and 29–28. On 13 October, DeGale went the 12 round distance against 32-year-old French super-middleweight champion Hadillah Mohoumadi and retained his EBU title. This was DeGales first fight under new promoter Mick Hennessy. The final judges scorecards read 119–109, 117–111 and 116–112 all in favour of DeGale.

=== Rise up the ranks ===
On 8 December 2012, DeGale outpointed 35-year-old Colombian fringe contender Fulgencio Zúñiga (25–6–1, 20 KOs) in a 12-round bout to win the vacant WBC Silver super-middleweight title. Zúñiga was dropped in round 3 but beat the count. When DeGale looked to attack and go for the stoppage, the referee inadvertently separated the boxers because he thought the bell sounded to end the round. All three judges scored the fight 118–109 for DeGale. On 17 May 2013 DeGale knocked out 33-year-old Canadian boxer Sébastien Demers in the second round in a non-title fight. The fight took place in Gatineau, Quebec, in Canada. Prior to this fight, Demers had not fought since 2011 and took the fight on a weeks notice. DeGale returned to the UK a month later on 8 June to defend his WBC Silver title against 38-year-old Stjepan Božić (26–6, 17 KO's) at Bluewater in Greenhithe, Kent. Božić's corner pulled him out before round five started after he was taking too much punishment. In the post-fight, DeGale said he wanted to next fight then IBF super-middleweight champion Carl Froch.

DeGale made two more successful defences of his WBC Silver title, the first came in November 2013 against American boxer Dyah Davis. DeGale won via unanimous decision all three judges scoring it 118–110 in his favour. His final defence came on 1 March 2014 at the City Academy Sports Centre in Bristol against undefeated Gevorg Khatchikian (20–0, 8 KOs). The fight was broadcast live on Channel 5. After 10 dominant rounds, which saw DeGale struggle to find the finishing blow, he dropped Khatchikian twice on round 11 to end the fight. Prior to the fight, DeGale was ordered to fight mandatory challenger Badou Jack by the WBC, however Jack suffered defeat to Dereck Edwards in a first round stoppage a few days earlier. With this win, DeGale became the mandatory challenger to WBC world champion Sakio Bika.

==== DeGale vs. Gonzáles, Peribán ====
On 10 April 2014, DeGale signed a promotional deal with Matchroom Sport. DeGale made his first appearance under Matchroom on the undercard of the Carl Froch and George Groves rematch at Wembley Stadium on 31 May 2014. His opponent was undefeated contender Brandon Gonzáles (18–0–1, 10 KOs) in an IBF final eliminator, who would be fighting outside of the US for the first time. DeGale dropped and stopped Gonzáles in round 4. The end came when DeGale landed a big left hook, flooring Gonzáles, after connecting with a left-right combination.

DeGale's second fight under the Matchroom banner took place at the Echo Arena in Liverpool on 22 November 2014 against former WBC world title challenger Marco Antonio Peribán (20–2–1, 13 KOs). The fight took place on the undercard of the Nathan Cleverly vs. Tony Bellew rematch on Sky Box Office. DeGale admitted this was his toughest fight to date and most important as a defeat could end his world title pursuit. DeGale became the first boxer to stop Peribán, when the fight was halted in round 3. DeGale landed two lefts, 30 seconds into the round and Peribán was unable to continue. Soon after the fight was stopped, DeGale called out Froch, labeling him a coward for not fighting him.

=== First reign as IBF super-middleweight champion ===
==== DeGale vs. Dirrell ====
In February 2015, Carl Froch vacated the IBF title, due to injury, paving the way for DeGale to fight for the title against the next available challenger. The next available challenger was American boxer Andre Dirrell (24–1, 16 KOs). A deal was complete for the two boxers to fight for the vacant title on 23 May 2015 at the Agganis Arena in Boston, Massachusetts. DeGale beat Dirrell by unanimous decision to win the vacant IBF super-middleweight title. Two judges scored the fight 114–112 and the third judge score it wider at 117–109, all in favour of DeGale. ESPN also scored the fight 114–112. Dirrell was knocked down twice in the second round. As the fight progressed, DeGale seemed to slower down his work rate, due to being fatigued. He managed to hold on until the end. According to Compubox punch stats, DeGale landed 115 of 400 punches thrown (29%), compared to Dirrell who landed 111 of 488 thrown (23%). DeGale was pleased to become the first British Olympic gold medalist to win a world title.

==== DeGale vs. Bute, Medina ====
It was announced in mid-2015 that DeGale would make his first IBF super-middleweight title defence against Romanian boxer and former world champion Lucian Bute. On 28 November 2015 at the Videotron Centre in Quebec, Canada, DeGale defeated Bute via unanimous decision. The fight was considered close, but DeGale did enough to earn comfortable scores of 116–112, 117–111, and 117–111. Bute admitted he gave it best effort, but wasn't enough. DeGale was able to block his punches and land the type of punches that would win him rounds. DeGale acknowledged Bute in the post fight, "All credit to Lucian Bute. He's a great champion and, believe me, he will be back." When asked about a possible unification fight against Badou Jack, DeGale said he would like to fight him in April 2016.

On 15 Feb 2016 it was announced that DeGale would make second defence of his IBF title against mandatory challenger Rogelio 'Porky' Medina (36–6, 30 KOs), with the fight to take place on 30 April at the DC Armory in Washington, D.C. DeGale was originally supposed to fight mandatory José Uzcátegui, however Uzcategui suffered an illness. DeGale outpointed Medina in a harder than expected fight. DeGale won on all three judges scorecards 117–111, 116–112, and 115–113. The fight averaged of 342,000 viewers and peaked at 397,000 on Showtime. Medina threw over a thousand punches during the fight and had some success cutting off the ring and cornering DeGale, but DeGale was ultimately able to win the fight with his skills, landing about half of his punches. Badou Jack also retained his WBC title with a draw against Lucian Bute, which was later changed to a DQ win for Jack, to set up a unification fight next.

==== DeGale vs. Jack ====
Showtime Boxing confirmed that a unification fight between DeGale and WBC champion Badou Jack (20–1–2, 12 KOs) was set for 14 January 2017. The fight was supposed to be announced for the autumn of 2016, however it had taken a little longer for the negotiations to complete. The vacant The Ring title would also be at stake as well as the WBC and IBF titles. On 15 November, it was officially confirmed that the fight would take place at the Barclays Center in Brooklyn, New York. The first time both fighters would be fighting at the arena.

In front of a crowd of 10,128, DeGale retained his IBF title but failed to capture the WBC and vacant Ring title after the match ended in a majority draw. Judge Glenn Feldman scored it 114–112 for DeGale and judges Julie Lederman and Steve Weisfeld both scored it 113–113 draw. DeGale knocked Jack down once in round 1 with a left hand. DeGale also hit the canvas for the first time in his professional career when Jack knocked him down with a right hook to the head in round 12. DeGale lost a tooth during the fight and damaged his eardrum. In the post-fight press conference, Jack's promoter Floyd Mayweather Jr. complained about the result saying his fighter had done enough to win and calling the decision "bad for boxing." When DeGale said he wanted a rematch possibly in London, Jack stated he would do it at light heavyweight, with Mayweather also saying Jack has gone too big for super-middleweight. DeGale's purse for the fight was $750,000, while Jack made $700,000. According to CompuBox, Jack landed 231 of 745 punches thrown, a connect rate of 31%, more than DeGale, who landed 172 of 617, connect rate of 28%. The fight averaged 454,000 viewers on Showtime.

In March 2017, DeGale wrote to the IBF and was granted medical exemption, as he was due to fight a mandatory next. The exemption meant he would next fight in Summer 2017.

==== DeGale vs. Truax ====
After recovering from a shoulder injury, on 20 September 2017, DeGale stated that he was looking to return to the ring in December 2017. He aimed to start punching again by the end of the month and begin sparring in October. On 25 October, ex promoter Frank Warren announced that DeGale would make his fourth defence of the IBF title for the first time on home soil on 9 December at the Copper Box Arena in London on a card promoted by Queensberry Promotions. The fight would also mark the first time DeGale fights in the UK since November 2014. A press conference took place on 30 October announcing DeGale's deal with Warren. DeGale said, "To be defending my World Title in my home city is a dream come true. I have made my name as a road warrior but now it is time to remind everyone at home who the best super-middleweight in the World is." On 14 November, former world title challenger and IBF #15 Caleb Truax (28–3–2, 18 KOs) was confirmed as DeGale's opponent.

On fight night, Truax pulled off a huge upset in defeating DeGale and claiming the IBF super-middleweight title after 12 rounds. One judge scored the fight 114–114, whilst the remaining two judges had it 116–112 and 115–112 for Truax. DeGale was mostly outworked and at times badly hurt. He started the fight well but fought mostly against the ropes for the remainder of the fight, allowing Truax to land many power shots. Round 5 saw Truax blasting away at DeGale on the ropes with right uppercuts and left hooks. The uppercuts from Truax snapped DeGale's chin back repeatedly, however he made it to the end of the round. Truax stated he and his team watched tapes of DeGale vs. Jack and realised DeGale didn't like pressure put on him. Speaking after the fight, DeGale said, "I thought I won it, but we got to change things. I should have waited until next year. I want the rematch. That’s what I want. I’m going to talk to Al [Haymon]." He also stated that he may have come back too quickly following his shoulder surgery. Days after the fight, Haymon Boxing's Tim Smith stated there indeed was an immediate rematch clause in the contract agreement.

=== Second reign as IBF super-middleweight champion ===
==== DeGale vs. Truax II ====
In mid February 2018, Frank Warren confirmed that rematch talks were on-going between DeGale and Truax to take place in the States. On 9 March, TGB Promotions along with Mayweather Promotions officially announced the fight as the co-main event of the card also featuring the light-middleweight unification fight Erislandy Lara vs. Jarrett Hurd at The Joint at Hard Rock Hotel and Casino in Las Vegas on 7 April 2018. Former two-weight world champion and analyst Paulie Malignaggi was brought in to camp to assist with his training alongside DeGale's long-time trainer Jim McDonnell. It was reported that both boxers would earn a $300,000 purse for the fight. Truax weighed in at 167 ^{3}/4 pounds with DeGale coming in slightly lighter at 167 ^{1}/4 pounds.

Prior to the fight, DeGale stated that he would retire if he lost. DeGale became a two-time world champion in defeating Truax via unanimous decision in what was a tough fight. Two judges scored the fight 114–113 and the remaining judge scored it 117–110 all in favour of DeGale. DeGale started off fast in the opening two rounds until a cut appeared over his right eye in round 3, which slightly impaired his vision. His corner did a good job of dealing with the cut, however blood kept streaming from the cut in the following rounds. In round 8, Truax suffered a cut over his left eye and then his right eye. DeGale sporadically pushed Truax during the clinches and was eventually docked a point for using his shoulder to nudge Truax in round 10. DeGale then rallied on in the final 2 rounds, which won him the fight on the 114–113 scorecards. Truax had a much lower output than in the first fight. In the post-fight, DeGale said, "Two-time world champion. It feels great. But full credit to Caleb – he showed he can mix it with the top fighters. I'm just happy that I'm a two-time world champion and I got my IBF world title back." Truax said, "I thought I did enough to win the fight, but I also thought I was pretty flat and didn't get my shots off like I wanted. I felt really good coming in but I just couldn't get my shots off like the last fight. He never hurt me, but it is what it is." Over the 12 rounds, Truax landed 103 of 471 punches thrown (22%) and DeGale was more accurate, landing 99 of his 327 thrown (30%).

=== Post-title career ===
On 20 June 2018, promoter Warren announced that fellow British boxer Billy Joe Saunders had been booked for The O2 Arena on 15 September. It was rumoured that Saunders would go up in weight and fight DeGale at the 168 pound limit. On 25 June, the IBF ordered DeGale to fight their interim champion Jose Uzcategui (27–2, 23 KOs). A purse bid was set for 5 July. On 4 July, DeGale released a statement in which he vacated his IBF title. DeGale stated the reason he vacated was because he was in the final phase of his career and he wanted to pursue bigger fights.

On 17 September, DeGale announced via his Twitter that he would return to the ring in an 8-round bout on 30 September at the Citizens Business Bank Arena in Ontario, California. DeGale stopped journeyman Fidel Muñoz Monterrosa in the round 3 to record his first stoppage win in 6 fights dating back to November 2014. DeGale knocked Fidel Muñoz Monterrosa down with a big uppercut. Muñoz Monterrosa was hurt and unable to make the count. DeGale used his jab and the occasional power shot during the fight, which was said to be an easy fight before DeGale took part in a big fight in December 2018. The fight took place at a catch-weight of 172-pounds.

==== DeGale vs Eubank Jr. ====
On 3 January 2019, an official press conference took place to announce the James DeGale vs. Chris Eubank Jr. grudge match, which would take place on 23 February at The O2 Arena in London, exclusively on ITV Box Office, as part of ITV's new deal with Haymon Sports’ Premier Boxing Champions. The rivalry between DeGale and Eubank (27–2, 21 KOs) began a few years ago, after a series of run-ins, from sparring one another in the gym to trading verbal insults across social media. Serious talks around the fight first began in July 2018 after DeGale vacated his IBF super-middleweight title. The last time DeGale had fought a fellow British boxer, until that point, was the majority decision loss to George Groves in May 2011. The fight was originally slated to take place in December 2018, however a deal had yet to be agreed. The possibility of the fight was first announced in November 2018 with PBC's plans to 'Invade UK Market', it was then stated a pay-per-view bout would be imminent. Eubank revealed he had been training in Las Vegas at the Mayweather Boxing Club alongside former boxer Nate Vasquez, who trains boxers and MMA fighters. Eubank said, "Instead of me going through the motions and trying to beat guys using heart and determination. Now we have strategy involved. This is going to take me to the next level." International Boxing Organization president Ed Levine confirmed their super-middleweight title would be at stake.

Eubank Jr was ranked #3 by the WBC and #4 by the WBA at super middleweight at the time. DeGale was floored twice during the bout and lost the fight via unanimous decision, 112–114, 112–115 and 109–117. After the fight, Eubank Jr said that he was surprised by DeGale's ability to take his best punches. DeGale did not attend the post-fight press conference.

=== Retirement ===
On 28 February 2019, following defeat against Eubank, DeGale announced his retirement from professional boxing. In a statement he wrote:

"It's been an unbelievable journey. It's hard to admit that I'm not the fighter I once was. I'm human and, along the way, my injuries have taken a toll - both on mind and body." "Today marks 10 years since my professional debut fight on 28 February 2009. It's been an unbelievable journey and I've had an amazing decade - if I'm honest, the best years of my life - and, having started boxing at the age of nine then being selected as part of the England amateurs squad, I've collected many memories along the way."

He was praised by his peers and retired with a record of 25 wins, 3 losses and a draw.

== Professional Bare-knuckle boxing career ==
On 11 July 2025, after being retired for six years, DeGale, now 39 years old, announced he had signed with Conor McGregor's Bare Knuckle Fighting Championship. He made his debut at the AO Arena in Manchester on 27 September 2025, securing a unanimous decision win over Australian Matt Floyd, who was docked three points during the fight for headbutts and other illegal tactics. The following day, DeGale's management team released a statement saying bare-knuckle "isn’t for him" and he would not be pursuing the sport further. The statement also referenced "dirty tactics" used by Floyd during the fight and added "boxing's discipline and respect" would always be DeGale's "standard."

== Personal life ==
DeGale has stated on numerous occasions that he is a big Arsenal fan and frequently fights with the Arsenal F.C. Club logo on his robe and shorts.

== Professional boxing record ==
29 fights	25 wins	3 losses
By knockout	15	0
By decision	10	3
Draws	1	

No.	Result	Record	Opponent	Type	Round, time	Date	Location	Notes
29	Loss	25–3–1	Chris Eubank Jr	UD	12	23 Feb 2019	The O2 Arena, London, England	For vacant IBO super-middleweight title
28	Win	25–2–1	Fidel Monterrosa	KO	3 (8), 2:57	30 Sep 2018	Citizens Business Bank Arena, Ontario, California, US	
27	Win	24–2–1	Caleb Truax	UD	12	7 Apr 2018	The Joint, Paradise, Nevada, US	Won IBF super-middleweight title
26	Loss	23–2–1	Caleb Truax	MD	12	9 Dec 2017	Copper Box Arena, London, England	Lost IBF super-middleweight title
25	Draw	23–1–1	Badou Jack	MD	12	14 Jan 2017	Barclays Center, New York City, New York, US	Retained IBF super-middleweight title; For WBC and vacant The Ring super-middleweight titles
24	Win	23–1	Rogelio Medina	UD	12	30 Apr 2016	D.C. Armory, Washington, D.C., US	Retained IBF super-middleweight title
23	Win	22–1	Lucian Bute	UD	12	28 Nov 2015	Videotron Centre, Quebec City, Quebec, Canada	Retained IBF super-middleweight title
22	Win	21–1	Andre Dirrell	UD	12	23 May 2015	Agganis Arena, Boston, Massachusetts, US	Won vacant IBF super-middleweight title
21	Win	20–1	Marco Antonio Peribán	TKO	3 (12), 0:30	22 Nov 2014	Echo Arena, Liverpool, England	
20	Win	19–1	Brandon Gonzáles	TKO	4 (12), 1:58	31 May 2014	Wembley Stadium, London, England	
19	Win	18–1	Gevorg Khatchikian	TKO	11 (12), 2:58	1 Mar 2014	City Academy Sports Centre, Bristol, England	Retained WBC Silver super-middleweight title
18	Win	17–1	Dyah Davis	UD	12	16 Nov 2013	Bluewater, Stone, England	Retained WBC Silver super-middleweight title
17	Win	16–1	Stjepan Božić	RTD	4 (12), 3:00	8 Jun 2013	Bluewater, Stone, England	Retained WBC Silver super-middleweight title
16	Win	15–1	Sébastien Demers	KO	2 (8), 1:58	17 May 2013	Casino du Lac-Leamy, Gatineau, Quebec, Canada	
15	Win	14–1	Fulgencio Zúñiga	UD	12	8 Dec 2012	Sports Arena, Hull, England	Won vacant WBC Silver super-middleweight title
14	Win	13–1	Hadillah Mohoumadi	UD	12	13 Oct 2012	Bluewater, Stone, England	Retained European super-middleweight title
13	Win	12–1	Cristian Sanavia	TKO	4 (12), 2:58	21 Apr 2012	Arena Nord, Frederikshavn, Denmark	Retained European super-middleweight title
12	Win	11–1	Piotr Wilczewski	MD	12	15 Oct 2011	Echo Arena, Liverpool, England	Won European super-middleweight title
11	Loss	10–1	George Groves	MD	12	21 May 2011	The O2 Arena, London, England	Lost British super-middleweight title; For Commonwealth super-middleweight title
10	Win	10–0	Alpay Kobal	TKO	5 (8), 1:37	12 Mar 2011	Braehead Arena, Glasgow, Scotland	
9	Win	9–0	Paul Smith	TKO	9 (12), 2:08	11 Dec 2010	Echo Arena, Liverpool, England	Won British super-middleweight title
8	Win	8–0	Carl Dilks	TKO	1 (10), 2:54	18 Sep 2010	LG Arena, Birmingham, England	Retained WBA International super-middleweight title
7	Win	7–0	Sam Horton	TKO	5 (12), 2:06	15 May 2010	Boleyn Ground, London, England	Won vacant WBA International super-middleweight title
6	Win	6–0	Matthew Barr	TKO	2 (6), 1:38	13 Feb 2010	Wembley Arena, London, England	
5	Win	5–0	Nathan King	PTS	4	5 Dec 2009	Metro Radio Arena, Newcastle, England	
4	Win	4–0	Ally Morrison	TKO	3 (6), 0:45	30 Oct 2009	Echo Arena, Liverpool, England	
3	Win	3–0	Ciaran Healy	TKO	1 (4), 2:59	18 Jul 2009	MEN Arena, Manchester, England	
2	Win	2–0	Jindrich Kubin	TKO	1 (4), 2:22	15 May 2009	Odyssey Arena, Belfast, Northern Ireland	
1	Win	1–0	Vepkhia Tchilaia	PTS	4	28 Feb 2009	National Indoor Arena, Birmingham, England	

== Bare knuckle record ==
Professional record breakdown
1 match	1 win	0 losses
By decision	1	0

Res.	Record	Opponent	Method	Event	Date	Round	Time	Location	Notes
Win	1–0	Matt Floyd	Decision (unanimous)	BKFC 81	27 September 2025	5	2:00	AO Arena, Manchester, England	

== See also ==
- List of world super-middleweight boxing champions
- List of British world boxing champions

Sporting positions
Amateur boxing titles
Previous: Vin Raj	ABA Middleweight champion 2005, 2006	Next: George Groves
Regional boxing titles
Vacant Title last held by Paul Smith	WBA International super-middleweight champion 15 May 2010 – December 2012; Vacated	Vacant Title next held by J'Leon Love
Preceded by Paul Smith	British super-middleweight champion 12 November 2010 – 21 May 2011	Succeeded by George Groves
Preceded by Piotr Wilczewski	European super-middleweight champion 15 October 2011 – 18 December 2012; Vacated	Vacant Title next held by Christopher Rebrassé
Vacant Title last held by Adonis Stevenson	WBC Silver super-middleweight champion 8 December 2012 – September 2014; Vacated	Vacant Title next held by George Groves
World boxing titles
Vacant Title last held by Carl Froch	IBF super-middleweight champion 23 May 2015 – 9 December 2017	Succeeded by Caleb Truax
Preceded by Caleb Truax	IBF super-middleweight champion 7 April 2018 – 4 July 2018; Vacated	Succeeded by José Uzcátegui
Awards
Previous: Keith Thurman vs. Shawn Porter	PBC Fight of the Year vs. Badou Jack; 2017	Next: Deontay Wilder vs. Luis Ortiz
