= Rhodes-on-the Pawtuxet =

- Rhodes-on-the Pawtuxet Ballroom and Gazebo
- U.S. National Register of Historic Places
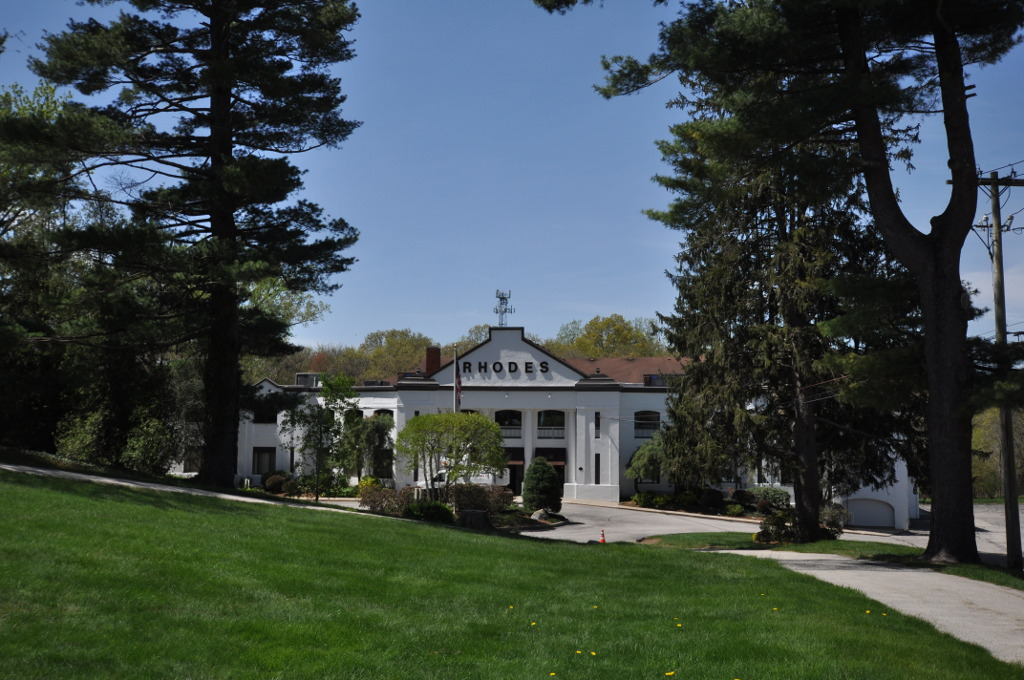

- Location within Rhode Island Location within the United States
- Location: Rhodes Pl., Cranston, Rhode Island
- Coordinates: 41°46′4″N 71°23′32″W
- Built: 1915
- Architect: John F. O'Malley; Harry A. Lewis
- Architectural style: Classical Revival
- NRHP reference No.: 78000007
- Added to NRHP: December 12, 1978

Rhodes-on-the Pawtuxet is a historic recreational complex at Rhodes Place, on the Pawtuxet River in Cranston, Rhode Island. Originally consisting of a series of buildings, including a stateroom, pavilion, and waterfront facilities, today only a ballroom and gazebo survive. The ballroom is a Classical Revival building designed by architects John F. O'Malley and Harry A. Lewis and built in 1915, after the entire complex, except for the stateroom and gazebo, was destroyed by fire. The stateroom burned in 1977. The gazebo was built c. 1880, and has long been a local landmark, with trademark Queen Anne scrollwork and turned corner posts.

These surviving structures were listed on the National Register of Historic Places in 1978.

== See also ==
- National Register of Historic Places listings in Providence County, Rhode Island
