= Billy Lyell =

American boxer

Personal information
- Nickname: Pride of Ohio
- Nationality: American
- Born: William Lyell; August 10, 1984 (age 41) Niles, Ohio, U.S.
- Height: 5 ft 11 in (180 cm)
- Weight: Super middleweight Middleweight

Boxing career
- Reach: 72 in (183 cm)
- Stance: Orthodox

Boxing record
- Total fights: 36
- Wins: 25
- Win by KO: 5
- Losses: 11

William Lyell (born August 10, 1984) is an American former professional boxer who competed from 2003 to 2013. He challenged for the IBF middleweight title in 2010.

== Amateur career ==
In an interview with Peter Czymbor, Lyell stated that he had an amateur record of "about 35-20" in "about 50-55 amateur bouts".

== Professional career ==
In February 2009, Lyell upset an undefeated John Duddy in a ten-round fight by split decision.

=== IBF Middleweight Championship ===
He then lost a very tough fight to Sebastian Sylvester.

=== WBC Silver Middleweight Championship ===
On June 5, 2010, Billy lost to undefeated champion Julio César Chávez, Jr. The bout was held at the Estadio Banorte in Culiacán, Mexico.
