= Dale Youth boxing club =

Amateur boxing club in London, England

The Dale Youth boxing club is an amateur boxing club in London that operated from a gym in Grenfell Tower on the Lancaster West Estate. It has produced many champions, but lost its premises in the 2017 fire that destroyed the tower.

== History ==
Before moving into the Grenfell Tower the club used a church hall, affectionately called "The Morgue".

Since 1999 or 2000 the club had occupied a 190-square-metre (230 sq yd) gym on the ground floor in the podium of the Grenfell Tower. During the two-year refurbishment it moved into temporary accommodation in a section of the basement garages of the "finger blocks"; in November 2016 it then moved to a new 287-square-metre (343 sq yd) venue on the walkway level of the tower.

Everything was lost in the Grenfell Tower fire on 14 June 2017, and the club moved back to its former temporary accommodation. Volunteers are helping prepare new premises for the gym and a community centre through the television programme DIY SOS.

== Coaches ==
There have been many coaches over the club's history. Mick Delaney, who runs the club, has been with it since 1978 and Gary McGuiness since approximately 2000.

== Notable boxers ==
Boxers trained at the club include Olympic gold medal winner James DeGale, super middleweight world champion George Groves and heavyweight Daniel Dubois.
