= Durrell Richardson =

American boxer

Personal information
- Nickname: Causing Much Havoc
- Nationality: American
- Born: July 7, 1979 (age 47) Youngstown, Ohio
- Height: 5 ft 8 in (173 cm)
- Weight: Light middleweight Middleweight

Boxing career
- Reach: 72 in (183 cm)
- Stance: Southpaw

Boxing record
- Total fights: 15
- Wins: 12
- Win by KO: 5
- Losses: 3
- Draws: 0
- No contests: 0

Durrell Richardson (born July 7, 1979) is an American former professional boxer who competed from 2004 to 2012.

== Amateur career ==
Durrell had a stellar amateur career, finishing with a 46–4 record. He won the 2002 National Golden Gloves welterweight championship.

== Professional career ==
On May 1, 2008 Richardson lost to Jesús González and the vacant WBC Continental Americas Light Middleweight title. His only other loss at the time was to undefeated contender Deandre Latimore. Richardson is the older cousin of the American actor Brandon Richardson.
