= Jonathan Reid (boxer) =

American boxer

Personal information
- Nationality: American
- Born: October 24, 1972 (age 53) Nashville, Tennessee
- Height: 5 ft 11 in (180 cm)
- Weight: Middleweight

Boxing career

Boxing record
- Total fights: 45
- Wins: 34
- Win by KO: 19
- Losses: 11
- Draws: 0

Jonathan Douglass Reid (born October 24, 1972) is an American professional boxer who challenged for the WBA middleweight title in 2000.

He was a contestant on reality TV show The Contender. On the show, he was placed on the East Coast team, fighting Jesse Brinkley in the second first round fight. In a second consecutive surprise (after Gomez beat Manfredo), Reid lost a hard-fought fight against Brinkley. As of January 2009 Reid's professional record stood at 34–11 with 19 wins by knockout.
