= Walid Smichet =

Tunisian boxer

Personal information
- Nicknames: "La Tempete de Sable" "The Sand Storm"
- Nationality: (Tunisia) (Canada)
- Born: Walid Smichet; 17 August 1979 (age 47) Tunisia
- Weight: middleweight

Boxing career
- Stance: Orthodox

Boxing record
- Total fights: 32
- Wins: 21
- Win by KO: 15
- Losses: 8
- Draws: 3
- No contests: 0

Walid Smichet (born 17 August 1979 in Tunisia) is a professional boxer based in Montreal, Quebec, Canada, who is known as "Tempete de Sable" ("The Sand Storm") who fights in the middleweight division.

Smichet has been the Canadian middleweight champion and also contended for the IBF International middleweight title.

== Background ==
Smichet was born in Tunisia although he fought all of his professional fights in Canada.

== Career ==
=== Amateur career ===
Walid Smichet boxed as an amateur from the age of nine. He was the Tunisian national champion for five years, from 1994 to 1999, and represented Tunisia at the 2001 Francophone Games.

=== Professional debut ===
Smichet remained in Canada after the Francophone Games and turned professional in July 2002, winning his first fight on points against Martin Desjardins at the Pierre-Charbonneau Centre, Montreal. Smichet lost and drew his next two fights both on points decisions but then won 13 of his subsequent 14 fights with the other fight being a draw. In that run of fights Smichet knocked out 10 of his 14 opponents including a KO victory over Ferenc Lankonde whom he had previously drawn with in his third pro fight.

=== Donny McCrary fight ===
Following this four-year unbeaten stretch, Walid Smichet then faced Donny McCrary, star of the reality TV boxing show The Contender, at the Montreal Casino, in February 2006.

McCrary landed strong punches throughout, notably in the second round. However, Smichet waved McCrary forward dismissively and then streamed forward, and towards the later rounds outworked McCrary.

The fight was over after eight rounds and was scored a draw with one judge each giving the decision to either fighter and the other judging it a draw.

=== Canadian middleweight title ===
Smichet's most high-profile fight came when he fought for his first title belt against Matt O'Brien. They faced each other for the Canadian middleweight interim title in March 2007 again at the Montreal Casino.

O'Brien, who was undefeated in his professional career with a record of 17 straight wins, fought well and was ahead on the judges scorecards when with less than half a minute remaining in the bout he was caught with a right-hand from Smichet and knocked clean out.

Smichet was then handed the full title after Byron Mackie failed to defend his belt against him.

=== Demers and the IBF International middleweight title ===
Smichet then faced Sebastien Demers for his newly won Canadian title and the IBF International Middleweight title. Demers had just been beaten for the first time in his career after facing Arthur Abraham for the IBF middleweight title in Germany.

Prefight Smichet had predicted that he would knockout Demers within eight rounds. Smichet was initially the aggressor and pushed forward relentlessly to take Demers out of his rhythm, however he lost momentum towards the end of the fight and Demers' superior technique pulled him through. Demers won a clear points verdict, however, the decision was met with a chorus of boos with commentators stating that the fight was much closer than the scorecards suggested with Demers just nicking many of the rounds. Demers stated, "I thought I won the rounds, but closely!".

=== John Duddy fight ===
On Feb 23, 2008, Smichet waged war against Irish boxer John Duddy. The fight he is best remembered for and was a candidate for 2008 Fight of The Year. on the undercard of the Wladimir Klitschko world heavyweight title unification fight versus WBO belt holder Sultan Ibragimov at the Madison Square Garden in New York City. The fight stole the show away from the main event, Smichet won many of the early rounds as the two stood toe to toe and opened a massive gash over Duddy's left eye. Beginning in round 5, Smichet tired noticeably and was ultimately outboxed by Duddy. He lost by majority decision, the scores were 95-95, 92-98, 92-98.
