= Matt Vanda =

American boxer

Personal information
- Nickname: The Predator The Fighting Pride of the East Side
- Born: 16 October 1978 (age 47) Arizona, United States
- Weight: Middleweight

Boxing career
- Stance: Orthodox

Boxing record
- Total fights: 61
- Wins: 45
- Win by KO: 25
- Losses: 16

Matt Vanda (born October 16, 1978) is an American former professional boxer who competed from 1996 to 2014.

== Professional career ==
Matt Vanda made his professional debut on March 30, 1996 in the welterweight division against Ed Fuller in Kearney, Nebraska. Winning the fight by knockout in the second round.

Vanda showed great potential as a young pro, finally returning to St Paul for his fourth professional bout, a win against Angel Louis Salgado. Vanda won his first 11 fights by knockout, and was undefeated in his first 31 professional fights, garnering national attention. The national attention soured after Vanda defeated Sam Garr on ESPN in a controversial decisions.

In April 2008 Vanda lost a unanimous decision to the highly regarded Sebastien Demers in a fight for Demers' IBF International middleweight title.

On June 24, 2005, "The Predator" Vanda recorded his greatest victory of his career in a thrilling victory for the I.B.A. America's Title over former World Champion Luis Ramon "Yory Boy" Campas in front of a rowdy crowd of 7,500 fans in his home state of Minnesota at the Target Center.

=== Duology with Chávez Jr. ===
On June 6, 2008, ESPN's Dan Rafael reported Vanda would fight Julio César Chávez Jr. on July 12, 2008.

On July 12 Vanda lost against Chávez Jr. in a controversial decision by a judge who gave the fight to Chavez 100 to 90. Chavez Jr. (37-0-1) won by a split decision over Vanda (38-7). Chavez won by scores of 97-93 and 100-90, while losing 96-95 on another card.

On November 1, 2008 Vanda lost against Chavez Jr. again this time by unanimous decision in a ten round affair.

=== Later career ===
On February 21, 2009, Vanda lost a unanimous decision to John Duddy in a ten round affair.

On April 18, 2009, Vanda (40-9) scored a disputed majority decision win against veteran boxer and two time world title challenger Tocker Pudwill.

On August 14, 2009, Vanda (41-9) had an impressive win against Ted Muller. This was a fight to prepare Vanda for his fight against the hard hitting Minnesota fighter Phil "The Drill" Williams. Vanda defeated Williams in a split decision.

== Professional boxing record ==
61 fights	45 wins	16 losses
By knockout	25	3
By decision	20	13
