= Carl Froch vs. Mikkel Kessler II =

Boxing competition

Warrior's Call
- Date: 25 May 2013
- Venue: The O2 Arena, Greenwich, London, UK
- Title(s) on the line: IBF and WBA (Regular) super middleweight titles

Tale of the tape
Boxer	(United Kingdom) Carl Froch	(Denmark) Mikkel Kessler
Nickname	"The Cobra"	"Viking Warrior"
Hometown	Nottingham, East Midlands, United Kingdom	Copenhagen, Capital Region, Denmark
Pre-fight record	30–2 (22 KO)	46–2 (35 KO)
Age	35 years, 10 months	34 years, 2 months
Height	6 ft 1 in (185 cm)	6 ft 1 in (185 cm)
Weight	167 3/4 lb (76 kg)	167 lb (76 kg)
Style	Orthodox	Orthodox
Recognition	IBF; Super Middleweight Champion; The Ring/TBRB; No. 1 Ranked Super Middleweight	WBA (Regular); Super Middleweight Champion; The Ring/TBRB; No. 2 Ranked Super Middleweight

Result
- Froch defeats Kessler via unanimous decision

Carl Froch vs. Mikkel Kessler II, billed as Warrior's Call, was a professional boxing match between IBF super middleweight champion Carl Froch and WBA (Regular) champion Mikkel Kessler. The fight took place on 25 May 2013 at The O2 Arena in London, England, United Kingdom. Froch was declared the winner by unanimous decision.

== Background ==
Froch and Kessler had first met both as part of the Super Six World Boxing Classic, a tournament involving the six best super middleweights in world boxing, which began in 2009. The unbeaten WBC champion Froch had begun the competition with a split decision victory over Andre Dirrell, whilst Kessler suffered the first defeat of his professional career in the first round with a defeat to Andre Ward. The pair's first fight then came in their second match of the tournament on 24 April 2010 with Kessler inflicting a first professional defeat on Froch winning a 12-round unanimous decision in a close hard fought contest on his home soil in Herning, Denmark.

Kessler was then forced to pull out of the Super Six due to the worsening of an eye injury that he suffered in his defeat to Ward. Meanwhile, Froch went on to defeat both Arthur Abraham and Glen Johnson on his way to meeting Ward in the final on 17 December 2011. Ward handed Froch the second defeat of his professional career with a 12-round unanimous decision to win the Super Six and unify his WBA belt with the WBC title Froch had since regained plus the vacant Ring and lineal titles.

Kessler had a year out of boxing on doctors recommendations before returning to defeat Mehdi Bouadla and Allan Green, before taking the WBA (Regular) title from Brian Magee (the "(Super)" belt still being held by Ward). Whilst Froch had also become champion again after knocking out Lucian Bute to grab the IBF title. He then stopped Yusaf Mack in his first defence before seeking to take on Kessler in a rematch for the chance to avenge his defeat to him, three years after their first encounter in the ring.

The Froch vs. Kessler rematch was first announced in January 2013 after a deal was reached between Eddie Hearn's Matchroom Sport and Team Sauerland with the fight to take place in Froch's home country this time at the O2 Arena in London.

== The fight ==
Froch had the better of the early rounds with Kessler starting slowly before firing back at Froch in the fourth, fifth and sixth rounds as the fight really came to life. Next it was Froch's turn to get the better of the action in some furious exchanges before the pendulum swung back in Kessler's favour as he landed some more big shots of his own as the bout reached its closing stages. Both men continued at the high pace they had set with Froch coming on strong in the last round leaving Kessler hanging on as the final bell sounded. After the full 12 rounds the three ringside judges had scored a unanimous decision for Froch with scores of 115–113, 116–112 and 118–110 in his favour. HBO's Harold Lederman and ESPN's Dan Rafael each scored the bout 117-111 in favor of Froch. Sky Sports' Jim Watt had it 116-112 Froch.

== Aftermath ==
After two years of inactivity in February 2015, Kessler announced that he was in a "state of retirement" via social media.

Much like Kessler and Joe Calzaghe, Froch shares a mutual respect with Kessler and the two remain in touch and on good terms since the sharing the ring twice. Three time world champion Froch went on to have what turned out to be the two biggest fights of his career against fellow Brit George Groves and was victorious on both the first occasion and the rematch before announcing his retirement with a record of 33–2, the defeat to Kessler in their first fight and the loss to Ward being the only blemishes on his record. While Froch's avenged win over Kessler turned out to be the Dane's final fight and the five time world champion retired with a record of 46–3, only tasting defeat against Calzaghe, Ward and Froch.

== Undercard ==
Confirmed bouts:

Winner	Loser	Weight division/title belt(s) disputed	Result
(United Kingdom) George Groves	(Uruguay) Noé González Alcoba	vacant WBA Intercontinental Super middleweight title	5th round TKO
(United Kingdom) Tony Bellew	(Malawi) Isaac Chilemba	WBC Silver Light heavyweight title	Unanimous decision
Preliminary bouts
(United Kingdom) Martin Joseph Ward	(United Kingdom) Andy Harris	Lightweight (6 rounds)	3rd round TKO
(United Kingdom) Callum Smith	(United Kingdom) Ryan Moore	Super middleweight (4 rounds)	1st round TKO
(Sweden) Anthony Yigit	(United Kingdom) Dee Mitchell	Light middleweight (4 rounds)	Points decision
(Germany) Enrico Kölling	(Lithuania) Vygaudas Laurinkus	Light heavyweight (4 rounds)	Points decision
(Denmark) Micki Nielsen	(United Kingdom) Paul Morris	Cruiserweight (4 rounds)	4th round TKO

== Broadcasting ==
Country	Broadcaster
Australia	Main Event
Hungary	DigiSport
Mexico	TV Azteca
Middle East	Al Jazeera Sport
Poland	Polsat Sport
United Kingdom	Sky Sports
United States	HBO

Preceded by vs. Yusaf Mack	Carl Froch' bouts 25 May 2013	Succeeded by vs. George Groves
Preceded by vs. Brian Magee	Mikkel Kessler's bouts 25 May 2013	Retired
