= Sport in Denmark =

Members of sport clubs in Denmark by sport (as of 2013) (Note: Numbers for single-sport associations under the National Olympic Committee and Sports Confederation of Denmark in 2014.)
Sport	Members	Growth (Note: Compared to 2012.)
Football	329,955	−3%
Fishing	220,000	+9%
Aquatics	170,639	+9%
Gymnastics	166,711	+10%
Golf	155,746	−1%
Handball	109,706	−2%
Badminton	89,753	−3%
Equestrian	69,946	−1%
Tennis	59,389	−3%
Shooting	54,517	+4%
Sailing	52,226	−5%

Sport in Denmark is diverse. The national sport is running, but club sport is football with the most notable results being qualifying for the European Championships six times in a row (1984–2004) and winning the Championship in 1992. Other significant achievements include winning the Confederations Cup in 1995 and reaching the quarter final of the 1998 World Cup. Other popular sports include handball, esports, cycling, sailing sports, badminton, ice hockey, swimming, and recently also golf. A few youths also play basketball.

Sport is encouraged in school, and there are local sports clubs in all cities and most towns.

The national stadium for football is the Parken Stadium.

== Football ==
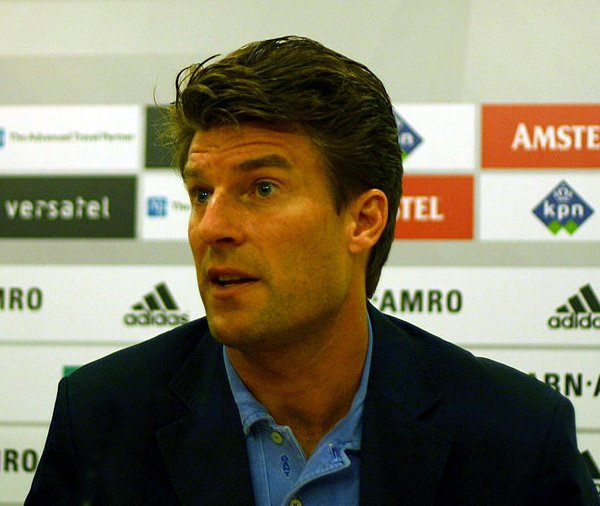
Michael Laudrup, named the best Danish footballer ever by the Danish Football Association

Football is the most popular sport in Denmark, with over 313,000 players in more than 1600 clubs. The national football team in Denmark have reached high and notable results, like qualifying for the UEFA Championships six times in a row (1984–2004) and winning the UEFA Championship in 1992. Other significant achievements include winning the Confederations Cup in 1995 and reaching the quarter final of the 1998 World Cup.

Denmark national football team reached #3 ranking in the FIFA ranking in May 1997, and #1 at the World Football Elo Ratings system in (1912–1920).

The top-league in Danish football is called The Danish Superliga. The reigning champions (2024/2025 season) are F.C. Copenhagen. Famous former Superliga players include Per Nielsen, Jimmy Nielsen, Michael Hansen, Mogens Krogh, Daniel Agger and Jesper Grønkjær.

The second level league is the Danish 1st Division followed by Danish 2nd Division and Danish 3rd Division. All clubs in the first four leagues are allowed to use professional players. The leagues below can only use amateur players without contract.

The top women's league is the A-Liga. Brøndby IF and Fortuna Hjørring are the joint most successful teams, with 12 titles each. Below the A-Liga are the B-Liga and C-Liga. In the Danish Women's Cup Brøndby and Hjørring are also joint most successful with 11 titles each.

The premier cup competition is the Danish Cup. F.C. Copenhagen are 10 time champions. Copenhagen are also the last winners of the Danish Supercup, back in 2004, of which Brøndby IF are the most successful club. Brøndby are the only winners of the twice-held Danish League Cup.

The current manager of the national team is Brian Riemer, and Pierre-Emile Højbjerg is the captain. Legendary former players include Poul "Tist" Nielsen, Peter Schmeichel, Jon Dahl Tomasson, Allan Simonsen and Michael Laudrup.

The current manager of the women's national team is Jakob Michelsen. Pernille Harder is the captain, and also holds the record for most goals for the national team. Denmark won the 1970 Women's World Cup and 1971 Women's World Cup. Their best continental result is silver medals at the 2017 European Championship.

== Handball ==
Denmark has a long history with handball, with the sport originating in Denmark. Handball is one of the most popular pastimes in Denmark, and it is the second most popular team sport only exceeded by football. There are over 117,000 licensed handball players in Denmark. Both the male and female national teams have reached high international rankings.

Denmark women's national handball team have won the Olympics gold medal a record three times, the European Women's Handball Championship three times, and the World Women's Handball Championship once. The male national team won the European Men's Handball Championship in 2008 and 2012, won gold at the Olympics in 2016 and has become world champions four times in a row, in 2019, 2021, 2023 and 2025 which is a feat no other country has managed. Denmark co-hosted the 2019 tournament with Germany, and did so again in 2025, this time with Croatia and Norway.

Viborg HK has won the most titles in the women's league with 14. KIF Kolding has the record in the men's league.

The women's clubs Viborg HK and Slagelse Dream Team have won the EHF Women's Champions League. On the men's side, several teams has reached the final, but none has so far managed to win it.

== Ice hockey ==
There are seven Danish ice hockey players currently in the National Hockey League (NHL): Lars Eller and Mads Søgaard of the Ottawa Senators, Nikolaj Ehlers and Frederik Andersen of the Carolina Hurricanes, Oliver Bjorkstrand of the Tampa Bay Lightning, Oscar Fisker Mølgaard of the Seattle Kraken, and Jonas Røndbjerg of the Vegas Golden Knights. Other Danes who have played in the NHL include Frans Nielsen, Mikkel Bødker, Jannik Hansen, Peter Regin, Philip Larsen, Alexander True, and Oliver Lauridsen. The first Dane to play a game in the NHL was Frans Nielsen on 6 January 2006. Lars Eller became the first Dane to win the Stanley Cup with Washington Capitals in 2018. There also many Danes in top level leagues like KHL and Swedish Hockey League.

The Denmark men's national ice hockey team have been in the best division since 2003. The Danish national hockey team scored two historic, unexpected upsets in Tampere, Finland, defeating the United States 5-2 on 26 April 2003 and tied Canada 2-2 six days later on 2 May 2003. At the 2010 World Championship Denmark finished eighth place, which is their best placing to date. As of mid-2025, the Denmark men's national ice hockey team was ranked 8th and the Denmark women's national ice hockey team was ranked 10th in the IIHF World Ranking. In 2018 Denmark was the host of the 2018 IIHF World Championships, Herning and Copenhagen were the host cities.

== Badminton ==
Denmark is Europe's strongest badminton country. Danish players have won 11 gold medals at the World Championships since 1977, 63 gold medals at the European Badminton Championships since 1968, and 19 titles at the Europe Cup since 1978. The Denmark national badminton team has won the 2016 Thomas Cup, and has been runner-up eight times in the Thomas Cup, three times in the Uber Cup, and two times in the Sudirman Cup. At the

In men's badminton, Viktor Axelsen, the current world's number two in men's singles, has won two gold medals at the BWF World Championship (2017 and 2022), and two gold medals at the Olympic Games (2020 and 2024). Poul-Erik Høyer Larsen's victory at the 1996 Olympic Games is one of three gold medals for Europe men's singles. Erland Kops won seven All England Open Badminton Championships in singles and four All England titles in doubles from the late 1950s to the late 1960s, whilst Morten Frost was one of the top players of the 1980s, winning the 1984 World Badminton Grand Prix and four All England singles titles. Topped the world rankings from 1998 to 2001 and with 22 Grand-Prix titles, Peter Gade is one of the world's most successful badminton players.

In women's badminton, Kirsten Thorndahl and Tonny Ahm claimed singles, women's doubles and mixed doubles titles at the All England. Lene Køppen and Camilla Martin have won singles titles at the World Championships and All-England. Other notable women's players include Ulla Strand (All-England doubles titles), Rikke Olsen (six World Championship medals), Helene Kirkegaard (two medals at the World Championships), Tine Baun (All-England singles titles), Kamilla Rytter Juhl (World mixed doubles title), and Christinna Pedersen (two Olympic and five World Championship medals).

The premier international badminton tournament in Denmark is the Denmark Open, which is part of the BWF World Tour. Meanwhile, the Danish National Badminton Championships is the most prestigious tournament for Danish players, and the Danish Badminton League is the main tournament for Danish clubs.

== Cycling ==
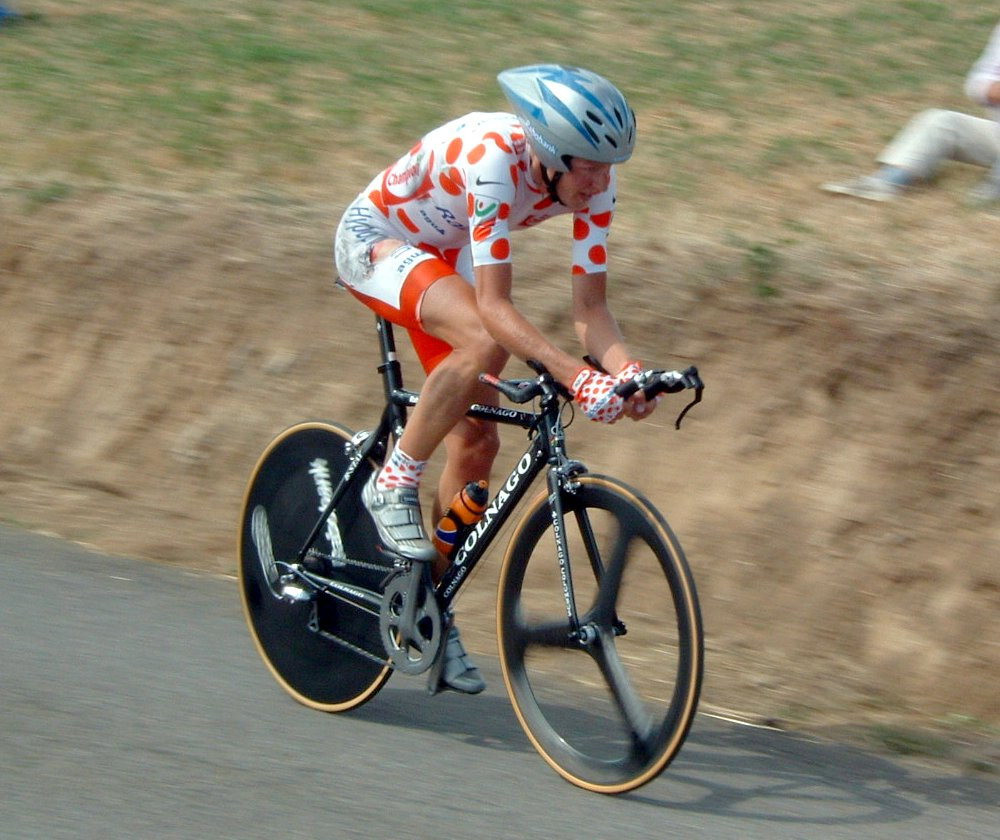
2005 Tour de France: Rasmussen wearing the polka dot jersey on the stage 20 individual time trial, sporting from the first of two falls.

Historically, Denmark's most successful name in cycling has been Thorvald Ellegaard won the world professional sprint title in six times, three European titles, and 24 Danish titles.

In recent years, Denmark has made a mark as a strong cycling nation, with Bjarne Riis winning Tour de France in 1996, Michael Rasmussen reaching King of the Mountains status, in the Tour 2005 and 2006, Jonas Vingegaard winning the Tour de France in 2022 and 2023 and Mattias Skjelmose winning the 2023 Tour de Suisse. Other well-known Danish riders are Matti Breschel, Nicki Sørensen, Bo Hamburger, Jesper Skibby, Jakob Fuglsang and Lars Michaelsen. Three Danish riders have won monuments, the five most prestigious one-day classics: Rolf Sørensen, who won Liège–Bastogne–Liège in 1993 and the Tour of Flanders in 1997, Jakob Fuglsang, who won the 2019 edition of Liège–Bastogne–Liège and the 2020 Giro di Lombardia and Kasper Asgreen who won the 2021 edition of Tour of Flanders. Team Saxo Bank has been the most successful cycling team in Denmark: the team was founded in 1998 as Team Home-Jack and Jones and led by Bjarne Riis from the following year. It competed as a Danish-registered team until 2014, when it switched its registration to Russia after being sold to Russian businessman Oleg Tinkov, although Riis stayed as the team's manager until 2015. In 2008 Carlos Sastre won the Tour de France while riding for Saxo Bank, one of five Grand Tour wins the team took in an eight year span. They also enjoyed success in the monuments, with Fabian Cancellara (who won Milan–San Remo in 2008 and the Tour of Flanders in 2010), Andy Schleck (who won Liège–Bastogne–Liège in 2009) and Nick Nuyens (who won the Tour of Flanders in 2011). In addition Cancellara won two World Road Time Trial Championship titles whilst riding for the team. Three Danish riders have won stages in all Grand Tours: Jesper Skiby, Magnus Cort and Mads Pedersen, the latter also won the 2019 UCI Road World Championships.

In the past years, the Danish cycling has suffered from doping cases. Bjarne Riis, Bo Hamburger, Rolf Sørensen, Jesper Skibby, Michael Rasmussen all confessed doping use, or were related with doping. But despite all the bad publicity, cycling is still quite a popular sport in Denmark. In 2011, Copenhagen hosted the UCI world championships on the road. Denmark hosted the Grand Depart in the 2022 edition of the Tour de France.

== Golf ==
Golf has become a highly popular sport in recent years in Denmark with more than 180 courses across the country.

Golf is mostly popular among the older demographic, with more members over the age of 24 than any other sport in Denmark.

In professional tour golf, Thomas Bjørn has dominated the Danish scene for many years, along with Anders Hansen, Søren Hansen and Steen Tinning on the European Tour. On the Ladies European Tour, Iben Tinning is the most successful Danish player.

== Basketball ==
Denmark's national team had a few strong showings at senior and youth level. The Bakken Bears currently hold the attendance record for a single basketball game in Denmark. They also holds the record for most Danish Championships with 20.

== Boxing ==
Denmark has many great boxers, including former Super Middleweight World Boxing Council World Champion and Super Middleweight World Boxing Association (WBA) World Champion, Mikkel Kessler. Former great boxers include Johnny Bredahl a former WBO and WBA champion and Brian Nielsen who fought Mike Tyson in 2001. The active boxer Ahmed Khaddour who was in the American reality TV show The Contender also comes from Denmark. Other boxers that have won titles at an international level are Patrick Nielsen and his brother Micki Nielsen.

== Flag football ==
The Danish flag football team, is one of the best Flag football teams in the world, having won a record 6 consecutive EFAF European Flag Football Championship and 2 bronze medals. They also won 4 silver medals at the IFAF Flag Football World Championship and 2 bronze medals. The women's team also had success, as they won the european championship in 2017 hosted in Denmark.

== Motor sports ==
In Denmark, there is also a small but successful group of people doing motorsport. The driver with the most 24 Hours of Le Mans wins so far is Denmark's Tom Kristensen with nine first places. Jan Magnussen has been a Corvette Racing factory driver since 2004, having claimed several GT class wins at the 24 Hours of Le Mans, 24 Hours of Daytona, 12 Hours of Sebring and Petit Le Mans. His son Kevin Magnussen has been competing in Formula One since 2014. Other notable Danish drivers include Kurt Thiim, Nicki Thiim, Jason Watt, Michael Christensen and Marco Sørensen.

The main permanent racetracks are Ring Djursland, Jyllands-Ringen and Padborg Park. The Danish Touringcar Championship was held from 1999 to 2010, and the Danish Thundersport Championship has been held since 2012. In addition, the Copenhagen Historic Grand Prix has been held since 2001.

=== Motorcycle speedway ===
Denmark have marked their status as one of the leading motorcycle speedway countries. The Denmark national speedway team has won the Speedway World Cup four times in 2006, 2008, 2012 and 2014, and came second in 2007 missing only two points to Poland. The team also won 17 Speedway World Pairs Championships and 11 Speedway World Team Cups.

Four Danish riders have won the Speedway World Championship: Hans Nielsen (four), Ole Olsen, Erik Gundersen, Nicki Pedersen (three each), and Jan O. Pedersen (one).

Erik Gundersen and Hans Nielsen occupied the first two places at Gothenburg in 1984. In fact, there were two Danes on top of the table in each and every World final from 1984 to 1988 - a somewhat extraordinary record. Gundersen and Nielsen took three titles each as the Danes won six successive and seven out of eight titles from 1984 to 1991.

The Danish Individual Speedway Championship is held since 1930, whereas the Danish Speedway League is held since 1956. The Speedway Grand Prix of Denmark is held since 1995, whereas the Speedway Grand Prix of Nordic took place from 2009 to 2012 and in 2024.

== Physical education and gymnastics ==
Franz Nachtegall was influential in the introduction of physical education and gymnastics into schools of Denmark.

== Racketlon ==
Denmark has the highest ranked racketlon player and two more within top seven (July 2015).

== Tennis ==
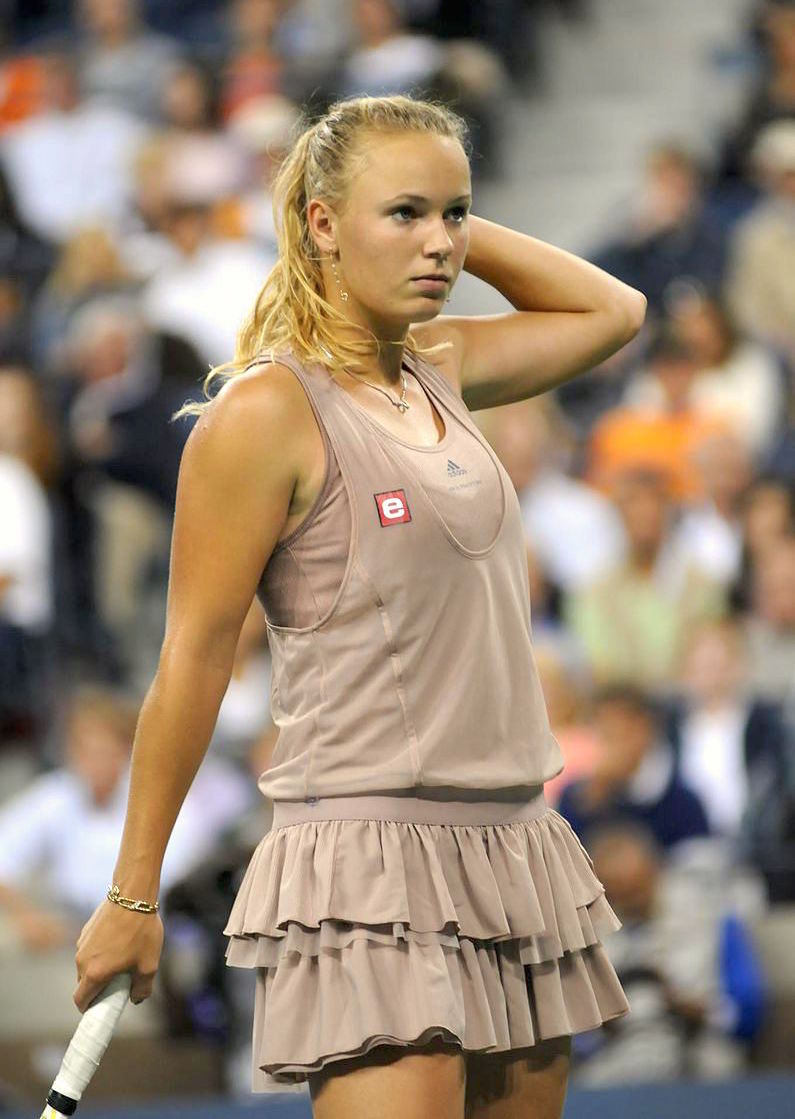
Caroline Wozniacki, professional women's tennis player and former world No. 1 on the WTA Tour

Caroline Wozniacki is commonly referred to as the best Danish female tennis player in history. She is a former singles world No. 1 on the WTA rankings, a position she held for a total of 71 weeks since reaching it for the first time in 2010. She was the first Scandinavian player to hold the top ranking position and the 20th woman overall in the Open Era. She has won the 2018 Australian Open and a total of 30 WTA Tour singles titles, including the 2017 WTA Finals. As of February 2024, Wozniacki is ranked 84th in the world.

The highest ranked Danish male singles player in history is Holger Rune, who reached a career-high ATP ranking of world No. 4 in 2023. At age 19, he won the 2022 Paris Masters and became the first male player on record to defeat five top 10 opponents in a single tournament (with the exception of the ATP Finals). As of February 2025, Rune is ranked 12th in the world and has reached three Grand Slam quarterfinals.

In 2012, Frederik Løchte Nielsen became the first Dane to secure a Wimbledon championship title, which he won in men's doubles with British partner Jonathan Marray. The team had previously only played three tournaments together, and had joined the 2012 Wimbledon draw through a wild card invitation. Nielsen, who retired in 2022, reached a career-high doubles ranking of 17th in the world in 2013.
