= Rudy Markussen =

Danish boxer

Personal information
- Nickname: Hardhitter
- Nationality: Danish
- Born: Rudy Markussen; 24 July 1977 (age 48) Copenhagen, Denmark
- Height: 6 ft 1 in (1.85 m)
- Weight: Super middleweight; Light heavyweight

Boxing career
- Reach: 74 in (188 cm)
- Stance: Orthodox

Boxing record
- Total fights: 44
- Wins: 39
- Win by KO: 26
- Losses: 4
- Draws: 0
- No contests: 1

Rudy Markussen (born 24 July 1977) is a Danish former professional boxer who competed from 1997 to 2015. He challenged once for the IBF super middleweight title in 2002, and once for the interim WBA super middleweight title in 2012. At regional level, he held the WBO Inter-Continental super middleweight title from 2003 to 2004 and the EBU European super middleweight title in 2004.

In 2006, Markussen was in a car accident, which temporarily put a halt to his career. He made a comeback 4 years later, having 6 fights between 2010 and 2012 (5 wins, 1 loss) before having a 3-year break from the ring. Markussen returned in 2015 for 2 final fights before permanent retirement.

== Career ==
=== Ottke fight ===
After the other Dane Mads Larsen lost his fight to Sven Ottke, Markussen was demanded by the Danish media to win fight against the undefeated German. Two undefeated fighters - Ottke (28–0, 5 KO) and Markussen (27–0, 16 KO) - facing each other for the IBF Super Middleweight title. With Ottke's 15 title defenses, the Dane was on paper clearly the underdog. But Markussen showed he wanted the title, and many commentators and experts thought that Markussen deserved the win. All three judges scored the bout 116–112 in favor of Sven Ottke.

=== Switching from Mogens Palle to Team Sauerland ===
Markussen with his promotor Kalle Sauerland in 2010.

After Markussen temporarily stopped his career after a car accident, he also criticized his promoter Mogens Palle for being selfish and destroying his career. Markussen meant that Mogens Palle didn't give him enough money. Both men have criticized each other in the media.

After Markussen made his comeback in 2010, he signed a contract with German Team Sauerland. with Sauerland featuring him in his last 2 fights on their Viasat Nordic Fight Night cards.

=== Magee fight ===
In February 2012, Rudy was going to face the reigning WBA regular champion Brian Magee in Brøndby Hallen, Denmark. It was the same story as the Ottke-fight in 2002, that the other Dane Mads Larsen met the same man, but both Danes lost. This time Markussen had to take revenge for Mads Larsen against Brian Magee. It was the second time in his career the Dane was going into a World title-fight. The last time was in 2002 when he faced Sven Ottke for the IBF Super Middleweight title.
Before the Magee fight, Markussen hadn't lost any fight since he temporarily stopped his career in 2006. But Magee changed all that in the fifth round with a punch to the liver. Markussen couldn't take that and was knocked out.

== Professional boxing record ==
44 fights	39 wins	4 losses
By knockout	26	3
By decision	13	1
No contests	1	

No.	Result	Record	Opponent	Type	Round, time	Date	Location	Notes
44	Loss	39–4 (1)	(Denmark) Patrick Nielsen	TKO	3 (12)	12 Dec 2012	Brøndby Hall, Brøndby, Denmark	
43	Win	39–3 (1)	(Georgia (country)) Ramazi Gogichashvili	KO	1 (8)	12 Sep 2015	Arena Nord, Frederikshavn, Denmark	
42	Win	38–3 (1)	(Hungary) Daniel Regi	TKO	1 (8)	8 Dec 2012	BOXEN, Herning, Denmark	
41	Loss	37–3 (1)	(United Kingdom) Brian Magee	TKO	5 (8)	18 Feb 2012	Brøndby Hallen, Brøndby, Denmark	For interim WBA super middleweight title
40	Win	37–2 (1)	(United Kingdom) Steven Bendall	TKO	4 (8)	17 Dec 2011	Herning Kongrescenter, Herning, Denmark	
39	Win	36–2 (1)	(Belgium) Michael Recloux	KO	1 (8)	3 Sep 2011	Herning Kongrescenter, Herning, Denmark	
38	Win	35–2 (1)	(Serbia) Dejan Ribac	KO	1 (8)	20 Nov 2010	Herning Kongrescenter, Herning, Denmark	
37	Win	34–2 (1)	(France) Christophe Karagoz	TKO	6 (8)	15 May 2010	Herning Kongrescenter, Herning, Denmark	
36	Loss	33–2 (1)	(Russia) Sergey Tatevosyan	KO	7 (8)	14 Oct 2006	Parken Stadium, Copenhagen, Denmark	
35	Win	33–1 (1)	(United States) Brock Stodden	TKO	2 (6)	28 Jan 2006	Boardwalk Hall, Atlantic City, New Jersey, United States	
34	Win	32–1 (1)	(Russia) Alexander Zaitsev	UD	8	14 Jan 2006	Brøndby Hallen, Brøndby, Denmark	
33	Win	31–1 (1)	(South Africa) Mpush Makambi	TKO	3 (8)	30 Sep 2005	Vesthallen, Slagelse, Denmark	
32	Win	30–1 (1)	(France) Hacine Cherifi	TKO	1 (8)	17 Jun 2005	SAS Radisson, Aarhus, Denmark	
31	Win	29–1 (1)	(Germany) Danilo Häussler	UD	12	24 Jul 2004	Brandenburg Halle, Frankfurt, Germany	Won vacant EBU super middleweight title
30	NC	28–1 (1)	(United States) Kabary Salem	ND	1 (12)	13 Mar 2004	Brøndby Hallen, Brøndby, Denmark	WBO Inter-Continental super middleweight title at stake; Fight stopped due to Markussen receiving cut from clash of heads
29	Win	28–1	(United States) James Crawford	KO	2 (12)	24 Oct 2003	K.B. Hallen, Copenhagen, Denmark	Won vacant WBO Inter-Continental super middleweight title
28	Loss	27–1	(Germany) Sven Ottke	UD	12	16 Nov 2002	Nürnberg Arena, Nürnberg, Germany	For IBF super middleweight title
27	Win	27–0	(United States) Ron Johnson	KO	1 (8)	13 Sep 2002	Randers Hallen, Randers, Denmark	
26	Win	26–0	(United States) Brad Ekstam	TKO	1 (6)	24 May 2002	Aalborg Kongres & Kulturcenter, Aalborg, Denmark	
25	Win	25–0	(Belgium) Danny de Beul	TKO	1 (6)	19 Apr 2002	Falconer Centret, Copenhagen, Denmark	
24	Win	24–0	(United States) Juan Carlos Viloria	PTS	6	9 Mar 2000	K.B. Hallen, Copenhagen, Denmark	
23	Win	23–0	(United States) Etianne Whitaker	SD	8	1 Dec 2000	Viborg Stadionhal, Viborg, Denmark	
22	Win	22–0	(United States) Anthony Atkinson	KO	1 (6)	3 Nov 2000	K.B. Hallen, Copenhagen, Denmark	
21	Win	21–0	(United States) Pat Lawlor	TKO	4 (6)	1 Sep 2000	Kolding Hallen, Kolding, Denmark	
20	Win	20–0	(France) Allaoua Anki	KO	5 (6)	26 May 2000	Holbæk Stadionhal, Holbæk, Denmark	
19	Win	19–0	(United States) Jerry Williams	KO	1 (6)	28 Apr 2000	K.B. Hallen, Copenhagen, Denmark	
18	Win	18–0	(United States) Terrence Jones	TKO	2 (6)	31 Mar 2000	Esbjerg Stadionhal, Esbjerg, Denmark	
17	Win	17–0	(South Africa) Samson Khoza	UD	6	14 Jan 2000	Kolding Hallen, Kolding, Denmark	
16	Win	16–0	(United States) Samuel Harvey	KO	3 (6)	26 Nov 1999	Viborg Stadionhal, Viborg, Denmark	
15	Win	15–0	(United States) Tim Pilant	KO	2 (6)	18 Jun 1999	Idrættens Hus, Vejle, Denmark	
14	Win	14–0	(United States) Donnie Davis	KO	1 (6)	4 May 1999	Cirkusbygningen, Copenhagen, Denmark	
13	Win	13–0	(United States) Gordon Finnie	PTS	4	16 Apr 1999	K.B. Hallen, Copenhagen, Denmark	
12	Win	12–0	(United States) Jimmy Hagar	PTS	6	12 Feb 1999	Falconer Centret, Copenhagen, Denmark	
11	Win	11–0	(Namibia) Nestor Tobias	KO	1 (4)	27 Nov 1998	Vejlby-Risskov Hallen, Aarhus, Denmark	
10	Win	10–0	(United States) Boyd Davis	PTS	4	6 Nov 1998	K.B. Hallen, Copenhagen, Denmark	
9	Win	9–0	(United States) James McCray	PTS	4	16 Oct 1998	Aalborg Hallen, Aalborg, Denmark	
8	Win	8–0	(United States) Tim Bryan	KO	1 (6)	18 Sep 1998	Sundbyøster Hallen, Copenhagen, Denmark	
7	Win	7–0	(United States) Joe Harris	PTS	4	5 Jun 1998	K.B. Hallen, Copenhagen, Denmark	
6	Win	6–0	(United States) Bruce Rumbolz	UD	6	20 Mar 1998	Vejlby-Risskov Hallen, Aarhus, Denmark	
5	Win	5–0	(United States) Melvin Wynn	KO	2 (4)	27 Feb 1998	Storebælthallen, Korsør, Denmark	
4	Win	4–0	(United States) Shane Davis	UD	4	13 Feb 1998	Falconer Scenen, Copenhagen, Denmark	
3	Win	3–0	(United States) Stacy Goodson	TKO	1 (4)	5 Dec 1997	Aalborg Hallen, Aalborg, Denmark	
2	Win	2–0	(United States) Dennis Lawlor	KO	1 (4)	14 Nov 1997	K.B. Hallen, Copenhagen, Denmark	
1		1–0	(United Kingdom) Paul Bonson	UD	4	3 Oct 1997	Østre Gasværk, Copenhagen, Denmark	

== Discography ==
Featured in single

- 2010: "Hardhitter" (Kaliber featuring Rudy Markussen and Kurt Thyboe).
