= Mikkel Kessler vs. Brian Magee =

Boxing match

Hævnens Time
- Date: 8 December 2012
- Venue: (Denmark) BOXEN, Herning
- Title(s) on the line: WBA (Regular) Super Middleweight Championship

Tale of the tape
Boxer	(United Kingdom) Brian Magee	(Denmark) Mikkel Kessler
Nickname	None	The Viking Warrior
Hometown	Belfast, Northern Ireland	Copenhagen, Denmark
Pre-fight record	36-4-1 (24 KO)	45-2 (34 KO)
Height	6 ft 0 in (183 cm)	6 ft 1 in (185 cm)
Weight	168 lb (76 kg)	167.75 lb (76 kg)
Style	Southpaw	Orthodox
Recognition	WBA (Regular); Super Middleweight Champion	WBA; No. 2 Ranked Super Middleweight

Result
- Kessler won by 3rd round knockout

Brian Magee vs. Mikkel Kessler was a Super Middleweight boxing contest between the defending WBA (Regular) champion Brian Magee, and the number one challenger Mikkel Kessler. The fight was given the title "Hævnens Time" (danish: Time of revenge), because Kessler had to take revenge after Magee defeated two other Danes - Mads Larsen and Rudy Markussen.

== Background ==
Magee had won the WBA "interim" super-middleweight title in a unanimous points win over Jaime Barboza in July 2011 before defending it with a TKO over Rudy Markussen in February 2012. He was then promoted to "Regular" Champion in November with Andre Ward remaining the "Super" Champion

After his withdrawal from the Super Six World Boxing Classic tournament (and subsequent loss of his WBC world title) through injury, Kessler would beat Mehdi Bouadla by TKO and Allan Green by KO before agreeing to fight Magee

== The fight ==
Kessler won on knockout victory in the third round, after landing three punches to the liver, which knocked out Rudy Markussen in his against Magee. Kessler won the WBA (Regular) Super Middleweight title.

== Aftermath ==
Magee said after this fight he would fight on, but this proved to be the final fight of his career.

Kessler then had a rematch against IBF Super Middleweight Champion Carl Froch who he had narrowly beaten to win the WBC title in April 2010. He would go on to lose on points to Froch and retire.

== Undercard ==
Confirmed bouts:

Winner	Loser	Weight division/title belt(s) disputed	Result
(Argentina) Guido Nicolas Pitto	(Lebanon) Reda Zam Zam	Super Welterweight (10 rounds)	8th round TKO.
Non-TV bouts
(Denmark) Rudy Markussen	(Hungary) Daniel Regi	Light Heavyweight (8 rounds)	1st round KO.
(Sweden) Erik Skoglund	(United Kingdom) Joe Ainscough	Light Heavyweight (8 rounds)	3rd round TKO.
(Denmark) Torben Keller	(United Kingdom) Gary Boulden	Super Welterweight (6 rounds)	1st round KO.
(Denmark) Dennis Ceylan	(Spain) Antonio Rodriguez	Super Featherweight (4 rounds)	Unanimous Decision.
(Denmark) Micki Nielsen	(Lithuania) Egidijus Kakstys	Cruiserweight (4 rounds)	Unanimous Decision.
(Norway) Simen Smaadal	(Belarus) Uladzimir Kharkevich	Light Heavyweight (4 rounds)	Unanimous Decision.
(Norway) Alexander Hagen	(Czech Republic) Josef Obeslo	Light Heavyweight (4 rounds)	Unanimous Decision.
(Denmark) Kristoffer Storm	(Czech Republic) Tomas Kugler	Light Heavyweight (4 rounds)	Unanimous Decision.

Preceded by KO4 Allan Green	Mikkel Kessler's bouts December 8, 2012	Succeeded by L12 Carl Froch
Preceded by KO5 Rudy Markussen	Brian Magee's bouts December 8, 2012	Retired
