= Mikkel Kessler =

Danish boxer (born 1979)

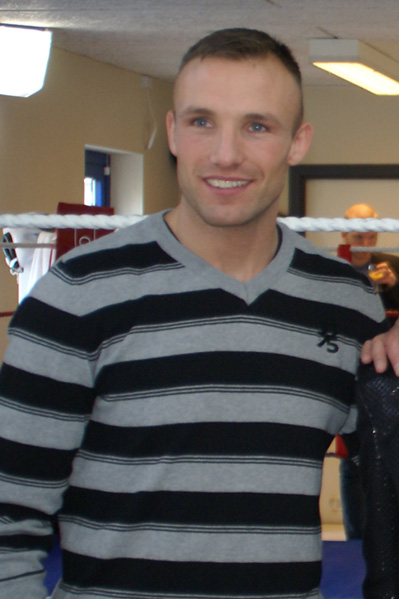
- Kessler in 2010

Personal information
- Nickname: Viking Warrior
- Nationality: Danish
- Born: 1 March 1979 (age 47) Copenhagen, Denmark
- Height: 1.85 m (6 ft 1 in)
- Weight: Super-middleweight; Light-heavyweight

Boxing career
- Reach: 188 cm (74 in)
- Stance: Orthodox

Boxing record
- Total fights: 49
- Wins: 46
- Win by KO: 35
- Losses: 3

Mikkel Kessler (born 1 March 1979) is a Danish professional boxer who competed from 1998 to 2013 and again from 2026. He held multiple super-middleweight world championships, including the WBA title (Super and Regular versions) three times between 2004 and 2013, and the WBC title twice between 2006 and 2010. In 2020 Kessler was admitted into the Danish Sports Hall of Fame.

== Early life ==
He began his vocation early, training in boxing gyms at age 13. Before Kessler started his boxing training he was a skillful track runner and he also played football and basketball at the local club.

== Amateur career ==
Kessler competed five years as an amateur (2/93-1/98). He finished his amateur career with a record of 44 wins and three losses. He won the 1995 European Cadet (15-16 age group) Championship, 1996 and 1997 Danish Junior Championships, the 1996 Nordic Amateur Championship, and in his last amateur bout won the 1998 Zealand International Tournament after stopping all 3 of his opponents.

== Professional career ==
=== Early career ===
Kessler originally campaigned as a light middleweight and then middleweight for the first 22 fights of his career.

=== Super middleweight ===
After 3 years and 22 fights, Kessler settled in the super middleweight division. Kessler continued his hard hitting streak, dispatching 6 of his first 7 opponents by KO, thereby improving his record to 29–0 with 22 KO.

On 29 November 2002, Kessler fought for his first championship and defeated former WBC Super Middleweight Champion Dingaan Thobela over twelve rounds to become the International Boxing Association Champion. He gave up this belt to fight for the more recognized WBC International title on 11 April 2003, versus Craig Cummings. Kessler won by a knockout in the third round.

He defended his title on three occasions before finally hitting it big on 12 November 2004. His stablemate, Mads Larsen, another Danish World Class fighter, was set to challenge Manny Siaca for the WBA Championship in Copenhagen. Larsen was injured in training and Kessler took the fight on short notice, winning the title.

Kessler defended his title against Anthony Mundine in Sydney in June 2005 and Eric Lucas in January 2006.

On 14 October 2006, Kessler was elevated to WBA Super Champion status after winning the WBC title in a unification battle against WBC World Champion Markus Beyer at the Parken Stadium. He won by knockout at 2:58 in round 3.

Kessler defended his WBA (Super) and WBC titles on 24 March 2007, at the Parken Stadium against WBC mandatory challenger Librado Andrade. The fight was scored as a shutout (120–108) by all three judges.

==== Kessler vs. Calzaghe ====
Kessler then met fellow undefeated champion, Welshman Joe Calzaghe, in a bout that would unify his WBA and WBC super middleweight championships with Calzaghe's WBO and The Ring titles. The bout took place at Cardiff's Millennium Stadium on 3 November 2007, in front of over 50,000 fans (then the largest indoor boxing event in European history), and Kessler lost the unification bout via unanimous decision, with the judges scoring the fight: 117–111, 116–112, 116–112.

==== Second world title reign ====
After Calzaghe vacated the WBA title to move up to light heavyweight, Kessler was put in a match with Dimitri Sartison on 21 June 2008, for the vacant belt. Kessler knocked out Sartison in the final round to regain his title.

Kessler successfully defended his title against Danilo Häussler by third-round knockout on 25 October and against Gusmyl Perdomo (16–2, 10 KOs) by fourth-round knockout on 12 September 2009, one minute into the round.

In November 2009 the WBA once again promoted him to Super Champion, this time prior to unifying any Super Middleweight titles.

=== Super Six ===
==== Kessler vs. Ward ====
His first fight was against Andre Ward on 21 November 2009 for Kessler's WBA Super Middleweight Championship in the Super Six World Boxing Classic. On 21 November 2009 Kessler lost his championship to Andre Ward. The fight was stopped in the eleventh round due to cuts on Kessler's face caused by what were deemed as unintentional headbutts by Ward, five in total. Kessler expressed in the post fight interview that he couldn't get out of first gear due to the headbutts and excessive clinching from Ward, and that he was eventually blinded by one of Ward's headbutts which on the post fight replay showed Ward ram his forehead directly into Kessler's eye. The fight went to the scorecards and Ward was far ahead by scores of 98–92, 98–92 and 97–93 at the time of the stoppage.

==== Kessler vs. Froch ====
On 24 April 2010 Kessler returned to fight against Britain's undefeated WBC Champion Carl Froch, a match that was called "a classic" and "one of the best matches in Danish boxing ever." The contest went the distance and Kessler was handed a unanimous decision with scores of 115–113, 116–112 and 117–111. With the win, Kessler became a two time WBC Champion, handing Carl Froch his first defeat in the process. Froch later stated that he'd suffered a minor ear injury during training and he felt he would've won the fight if it had been held in his home-country of England, but congratulated Kessler on his victory.

Andre Ward later praised Kessler tremendously in an interview, calling Kessler "skill wise... the toughest I’ve fought so far." Ward went on to express admiration over Kessler's career and dispelling any criticism after his own victory over Kessler. "People want to put down Mikkel Kessler because of our fight but he’s proven himself. He’s proven that if he loses a title he can come back and become champion again, he did that after our fight so now he’s a three time world champion. Anybody that can win a world title three times and only have two losses in the process says a lot. He’s a great fighter and I give him a lot of credit and I have a lot of respect for him."

On 25 August Kessler announced he was withdrawing from the Super Six tournament due to the worsening of the eye injury he suffered in his fight against Ward. According to Ekstra Bladet newspaper, Kessler stated he was seeing double. Doctors told him he must take a nine-month break from boxing.

=== Light heavyweight ===
==== Kessler vs. Green ====
In 2012, Kessler moved up in weight class to light heavyweight. In May 2012, he fought Allan Green for the vacant WBC Silver Light Heavyweight title. Kessler won via knockout in the fourth round, after getting dropped by a hard right hand in the first round.

=== Return to super middleweight ===
==== Kessler vs. Magee ====
Late in 2012, Kessler went up against Brian Magee of Northern Ireland for the WBA (Regular) super middleweight title. Two times in the 2nd round Brian Magee went to the floor after hard bodyshots from Kessler, and 24 seconds in the third round it was all over, when Kessler landed another hard bodyshot to Brian Magee.

==== Kessler vs. Froch II ====
On 15 January 2013, it was announced that a rematch between Mikkel Kessler and Carl Froch was going to take place on 25 May 2013 at The O2 Arena in London. There will be two belts on the line, Kessler's WBA (Regular) and Froch's IBF title. Kessler won the last showdown between the two boxers, in Herning, Denmark. That time Froch was an undefeated WBC title holder, and they were both fighting in the Super Six World Boxing Classic. The faced each other at stage 2, after Kessler lost his first fight against Andre Ward, and Froch won a close fought contest against Andre Dirrell.

Froch defeated Kessler by unanimous decision on 25 May 2013, by 118–110 116–112 115–113 as he controlled Kessler with his jab for large parts of the fight. Kessler caught Froch with a big right hand in the 11th round to wobble him, but it was too late in the fight.

=== Retirement and potential comeback ===
On 1 February 2015, Kessler announced that he was in a "state of retirement" via social media. Kessler came out of retirement on 31 March 2017. On 21 June, it was said that Kessler could be added to the World Boxing Super Series. Kessler passed on the Super Series and was looking to face Roamer Angulo on November. On 16 October, Kessler revealed he had been hit by Lyme disease and his return would be delayed until 2018. In February 2018, speaking to BT, Kessler said, "I just can't find the motivation to go through with it all," confirming he would stay retired.

Kessler came out of retirement on 1 October 2026 and is due to fight the American, Bernard Joseph, on the 28 of November 2026.

== Life after boxing ==
After his retirement Kessler works with lectures, team building and personal training through Team Kessler at his gym. He is also coaching young boxing prospects. An example of this is the IBF and IBO super middleweight world championship challenger Oliver Zaren.

== Personal life ==
Kessler was born to a Danish father, Ole Kessler (1945 - 2013), and an English mother, Ann Patricia Christiansen, born Coleman, (1938 - 2016), who hails from Salisbury, Wiltshire.

== In popular culture ==
Mikkel Kessler is mentioned by name in the Danish band Volbeat's song "A Warrior's Call" with the lyric "The Viking warrior Mikkel Kessler will now brand his name in the back of your head, yeah..."

In 2011 Kessler made a brief appearance in the Danish reality show, Familien fra Bryggen. A show about his family.

In 2019 Kessler participated in Vild med dans, the Danish version of Strictly Come Dancing. He was eliminated in episode 9 with dancing partner, Mille Funk.

In 2021 Kessler participated in the Danish reality show, Jaget vildt: Kendte på flugt.

In 2024 his autobiography, Mikkel Kessler - Uden parader was released.

Kessler - The Viking Warrior, a movie about his life and career is set to be released in early 2027.

== Professional boxing record ==
49 fights	46 wins	3 losses
By knockout	35	0
By decision	11	3

No.	Result	Record	Opponent	Type	Round, time	Date	Location	Notes
49	Loss	46–3	Carl Froch	UD	12	25 May 2013	The O2 Arena, London, England	Lost WBA (Regular) super-middleweight title; For IBF super-middleweight title
48	Win	46–2	Brian Magee	TKO	3 (12), 0:24	8 Dec 2012	Jyske Bank Boxen, Herning, Denmark	Won WBA (Regular) super-middleweight title
47	Win	45–2	Allan Green	KO	4 (12), 0:17	19 May 2012	Parken Stadium, Copenhagen, Denmark	Won vacant WBC Silver light-heavyweight title
46	Win	44–2	Mehdi Bouadla	TKO	6 (12), 2:25	4 Jun 2011	Parken Stadium, Copenhagen, Denmark	Won vacant WBO European super-middleweight title
45	Win	43–2	Carl Froch	UD	12	24 Apr 2010	MCH Messecenter Herning, Herning, Denmark	Won WBC super-middleweight title
44	Loss	42–2	Andre Ward	TD	11 (12), 1:42	21 Nov 2009	Oracle Arena, Oakland, California, US	Lost WBA (Super) super-middleweight title; Super Six World Boxing Classic: group stage 1; Unanimous TD after Kessler cut from accidental head clashes
43	Win	42–1	Gusmyr Perdomo	TKO	4 (12), 0:51	12 Sep 2009	MCH Messecenter Herning, Herning, Denmark	Retained WBA super-middleweight title
42	Win	41–1	Danilo Haussler	KO	3 (12), 1:08	25 Oct 2008	Weser-Ems-Halle, Oldenburg, Germany	Retained WBA super-middleweight title
41	Win	40–1	Dimitri Sartison	KO	12 (12), 2:00	21 Jun 2008	Brøndby Hall, Copenhagen, Denmark	Won vacant WBA (Regular) super-middleweight title
40	Loss	39–1	Joe Calzaghe	UD	12	3 Nov 2007	Millennium Stadium, Cardiff, Wales	Lost WBA (Unified) and WBC super-middleweight titles; For WBO and The Ring super-middleweight titles
39	Win	39–0	Librado Andrade	UD	12	24 Mar 2007	Parken Stadium, Copenhagen, Denmark	Retained WBA (Unified) and WBC super-middleweight titles
38	Win	38–0	Markus Beyer	KO	3 (12), 2:58	14 Oct 2006	Parken Stadium, Copenhagen, Denmark	Retained WBA (Unified) super-middleweight title; Won WBC super-middleweight title
37	Win	37–0	Eric Lucas	TKO	10 (12), 1:51	14 Jan 2006	Brøndby Hall, Copenhagen, Denmark	Retained WBA super-middleweight title
36	Win	36–0	Anthony Mundine	UD	12	8 Jun 2005	Entertainment Centre, Sydney, Australia	Retained WBA super-middleweight title
35	Win	35–0	Manny Siaca	RTD	7 (12), 3:00	12 Nov 2004	Brøndby Hall, Copenhagen, Denmark	Won WBA super-middleweight title
34	Win	34–0	Andre Thysse	TKO	11 (12), 1:32	11 Jun 2004	K.B. Hallen, Copenhagen, Denmark	Retained WBC International super-middleweight title
33	Win	33–0	Julio César Green	KO	1 (12), 1:20	13 Mar 2004	Brøndby Hall, Copenhagen, Denmark	Retained WBC International super-middleweight title
32	Win	32–0	Henry Porras	TKO	9 (12), 2:46	24 Oct 2003	K.B. Hallen, Copenhagen, Denmark	Retained WBC International super-middleweight title
31	Win	31–0	Craig Cummings	KO	3 (12), 1:09	11 Apr 2003	K.B. Hallen, Copenhagen, Denmark	Won vacant WBC International super-middleweight title
30	Win	30–0	Dingaan Thobela	UD	12	29 Nov 2002	Falkoner Center, Copenhagen, Denmark	Won vacant IBA super-middleweight title
29	Win	29–0	Dean Williams	KO	1 (8), 1:58	8 Nov 2002	Falkoner Center, Copenhagen, Denmark	
28	Win	28–0	Gerard Zdziarski	TKO	8 (8), 2:33	4 Oct 2002	Holbæk Stadion, Holbæk, Denmark	
27	Win	27–0	Orlando Javier Acuna	RTD	6 (8), 3:00	24 May 2002	Aalborghallen, Aalborg, Denmark	
26	Win	26–0	Arthur Allen	TKO	6 (8), 0:52	15 Mar 2002	Stadionhal, Viborg, Denmark	
25	Win	25–0	Manny Sobral	RTD	4 (8), 3:00	8 Feb 2002	Falkoner Center, Copenhagen, Denmark	
24	Win	24–0	Fernando Hernández	TKO	2 (8), 1:30	16 Nov 2001	Roskilde Hallerne, Roskilde, Denmark	
23	Win	23–0	David Mendez	UD	6	13 Oct 2001	Parken Stadium, Copenhagen, Denmark	
22	Win	22–0	Rodrigues Moungo	KO	4 (6), 1:09	27 Apr 2001	Aalborghallen, Aalborg, Denmark	
21	Win	21–0	Miguel Julio	KO	3 (6), 0:30	9 Mar 2001	K.B. Hallen, Copenhagen, Denmark	
20	Win	20–0	Patrick Rubes	KO	2 (6), 0:45	9 Feb 2001	Idrætshal, Odense, Denmark	
19	Win	19–0	Tony Menefee	TKO	6 (6), 1:36	1 Sep 2000	Koldinghallerne, Kolding, Denmark	
18	Win	18–0	Kevin Hall	KO	2 (6), 2:41	28 Apr 2000	K.B. Hallen, Copenhagen, Denmark	
17	Win	17–0	Tom Younan	KO	3 (6), 1:35	31 Mar 2000	Stadionhal, Esbjerg, Denmark	
16	Win	16–0	Israel Ponce	KO	2 (6), 2:59	4 Mar 2000	Mandalay Bay Events Center, Paradise, Nevada, US	
15	Win	15–0	Charles Whittaker	KO	3 (6), 2:30	18 Feb 2000	Aalborghallen, Aalborg, Denmark	
14	Win	14–0	Sidney Mxoli Msutu	UD	6	14 Jan 2000	Koldinghallerne, Kolding, Denmark	
13	Win	13–0	Jean Paul D'Alessandro	UD	6	4 May 1999	Circus Building, Copenhagen, Denmark	
12	Win	12–0	Jose Maquina Rojas	KO	2 (6), 2:10	16 Apr 1999	K.B. Hallen, Copenhagen, Denmark	
11	Win	11–0	Alejandro De Leon	UD	6	19 Mar 1999	Falkoner Center, Copenhagen, Denmark	
10	Win	10–0	Jaime Balboa	KO	6 (6), 2:13	12 Feb 1999	Falkoner Center, Copenhagen, Denmark	
9	Win	9–0	Dean Martin	UD	6	27 Nov 1998	Vejlby-Risskov Hallen, Aarhus, Denmark	
8	Win	8–0	Anthony Ivory	UD	6	6 Nov 1998	K.B. Hallen, Copenhagen, Denmark	
7	Win	7–0	Edwin Murillo	KO	2 (6), 2:34	16 Oct 1998	Aalborghallen, Aalborg, Denmark	
6	Win	6–0	Sammy Sparkman	KO	1 (4), 2:54	18 Sep 1998	Sundbyøster Hallen, Copenhagen, Denmark	
5	Win	5–0	Terry Clark	KO	1 (4), 2:35	4 Sep 1998	Koldinghallerne, Kolding, Denmark	
4	Win	4–0	Rick Stockton	KO	1 (4), 2:16	5 Jun 1998	K.B. Hallen, Copenhagen, Denmark	
3	Win	3–0	Alex Lubo	UD	4	1 May 1998	Kolding Teater, Kolding, Denmark	
2	Win	2–0	Michael Corleone	TKO	3 (4), 2:40	3 Apr 1998	Holbæk Stadion, Holbæk, Denmark	
1	Win	1–0	Kelly Mays	KO	1 (4), 1:09	20 Mar 1998	Vejlby-Risskov Hallen, Aarhus, Denmark	

== Titles in boxing ==
=== Major world titles ===
- WBA (Unified and Super) super middleweight champion (168 lbs) (2×) (Note: Became "Unified" champion during his first primary reign; Promoted to "Super" champion during his second primary reign.)
- WBC super middleweight champion (168 lbs) (2×)

=== Secondary major world titles (Note: The secondary champion lineage lists the Regular or Unified champions while the primary champion is occupied.) ===
- WBA (Regular) super middleweight champion (168 lbs) (2×) (Note: Was secondary champion from June 21 – October 3, 2008 before being promoted to primary champion; Subsequently became secondary champion again from December 8, 2012 – May 25, 2013.)

=== Silver world titles (Note: In 2010, the WBC created the "Silver Championship", intended as a replacement for interim titles.) ===
- WBC Silver light heavyweight champion (175 lbs)

=== Minor world titles ===
- IBA super middleweight champion (168 lbs)

=== Regional/International titles ===
- WBC International super middleweight champion (168 lbs)
- WBO European super middleweight champion (168 lbs)

=== Honorary titles ===
- WBC Emeritus Champion

== Viewership ==
=== Denmark ===
Date	Fight	Network	Viewership (avg.)	Source(s)
4 June 2011	Mikkel Kessler vs. Mehdi Bouadla	TV 2	788,000	
	Total viewership		788,000	

== Notes and references ==
=== References ===
Sporting positions
Regional boxing titles
Vacant Title last held by Jürgen Brähmer	WBC International super-middleweight champion 11 April 2003 – November 2004; Vacated	Vacant Title next held by Otis Grant
Vacant Title last held by Roberto Santos	WBO European super-middleweight champion 4 June 2011 – January 2012; Vacated	Vacant Title next held by Arthur Abraham
New title	WBC Silver light-heavyweight champion 19 May 2012 – November 2012; Vacated	Vacant Title next held by Tony Bellew
Minor world boxing titles
Vacant Title last held by Reginaldo Andrade	IBA super-middleweight champion 29 November 2002 – April 2003; Vacated	Vacant Title next held by Anthony Bonsante
Major world boxing titles
Preceded by Manny Siaca	WBA super-middleweight champion 12 November 2004 – 14 October 2006; Won Unified title	Succeeded by Himself as Unified champion
Preceded by Himself as Champion	WBA super-middleweight champion Unified title 14 October 2006 – 4 November 2007	Succeeded by Joe Calzaghe
Preceded by Markus Beyer	WBC super-middleweight champion 14 October 2006 – 4 November 2007	Succeeded by Joe Calzaghe
Vacant Title last held by Anthony Mundine	WBA (Regular) super middleweight champion 21 June 2008 – 21 October 2008; Promoted	Vacant Title next held by Dimitri Sartison
Vacant Title last held by Joe Calzaghe as Unified champion	WBA super-middleweight champion 21 October 2008 – 3 November 2009; Promoted	Succeeded by Himself as Super champion
New title	WBA super-middleweight champion Super title 3 November 2009 – 21 November 2009	Succeeded by Andre Ward
Preceded by Carl Froch	WBC super-middleweight champion 24 April 2010 – 7 September 2010; Status changed	Vacant Title next held by Carl Froch
Preceded by Brian Magee	WBA (Regular) super middleweight champion 8 December 2012 – 26 May 2013; Lost bid for Unified title	Succeeded by Carl Froch as Unified champion
