= Rudy Markussen vs. Patrick Nielsen =

2015 boxing match

"Ondt Blod"
- Date: 12 December 2015
- Venue: Brøndby Hall, Brøndby, Denmark
- Title(s) on the line: None

Tale of the tape
Boxer	(Denmark) Patrick Nielsen	(Denmark) Rudy Markussen
Nickname	None	The Hardhitter
Hometown	Albertslund, Copenhagen, Denmark	Amager, Copenhagen, Denmark
Pre-fight record	27-1 (13 KO)	39-3 (26 KO)
Height	6 ft 0 in (183 cm)	5 ft 11.5 in (182 cm)
Weight	170.5 lb (77 kg)	169.25 lb (77 kg)
Style	Southpaw	Orthodox
Recognition	WBO; No. 2 Ranked Super Middleweight; WBA; No. 4 Ranked Super Middleweight; IBF; No. 6 Ranked Super Middleweight	

Result
- Nielsen defeats Markussen by 3rd round TKO

Patrick Nielsen vs. Rudy Markussen, billed as "Ondt Blod", was a professional boxing match in the super middleweight division between two Danish rivals, WBA International champion Patrick Nielsen, and former EBU European champion Rudy Markussen. The fight took place at Brøndby Hall, Brøndby, Denmark on 12 December 2015 and was given the title "Ondt Blod" (danish: Bad Blood), because the two contenders has expressed hostility towards each other.

== Background ==
The buildup for the fight began when Markussen said in an article on 21 February 2015, said that he wanted to meet his young Danish countryman who had just moved up into the super-middleweight division. The challenge from Rudy did not raise the attention of the Danish boxing public, but provoked Nielsen who, after knocking out the American George Tahdooahnippah on 14 March 2015, called out Markussen to the audience at the Ballerup Super Arena. This was the start of a verbal showdown between the two boxers that took place in the media. This unexpectedly intensified in the press but Nielsen's promoter, Nisse Sauerland, was not willing to arrange a match between rivals. While Sauerland hesitated to negotiate negotiations between the Danes, a bid was received from Danish promoter Mogens Palle and Hans Henrik Palm, who offered to arrange the match and, in addition, a solid financial amount, however, where the offer most benefited Markussen. The offer was rejected by Sauerland and Nielsen, who considered it a provocation and an offensive at the ongoing boxing business where Nielsen was the main name.

On 29 April 2015, for a press conference at the Copenhagen hotel between Nielsen and his upcoming opponent Ruben Eduardo Acosta, Markussen unexpectedly appeared and challenged Nielsen face to face. It was hoped that a World title match could be arranged between the winner and WBO world champion Arthur Abraham.

== The fight ==
From the start, the two boxers threw themselves into each other with Nielsen had establishing his jab and repeatedly hitting Markussen with his left hand.

In the third round the fight was ended when Markussen was hit by a short left hook high on the head from a close range.

== Aftermath ==
Rudy Markussen retired after this fight, while Nielsen moved up the Light Heavyweight division after a year of inactivity.

== Undercard ==
Confirmed bouts:

Winner	Loser	Weight division/title belt(s) disputed	Result
(Denmark) Dennis Ceylan	(Colombia) Walter Estrada	Featherweight (8 rounds)	2nd-round TKO.
Non-TV bouts
(Denmark) Micki Nielsen	(Bulgaria) Konstantin Semerdjiev	Cruiserweight (8 rounds)	3rd-round TKO.
(Norway) Tim Robin Lihaug	(Hungary) Jozsef Racz	Super Middleweight (8 rounds)	Unanimous Decision.
(Denmark) Abdul Khattab	(Colombia) Francisco Corderoh	Middleweight (8 rounds)	Unanimous Decision.
(Denmark) Dina Thorslund	(Serbia) Jasmina Nadj	Super Bantamweight (6 rounds)	Unanimous Decision.
(United Kingdom) Deion Jumah	(Ukraine) Vasyl Kondor	Light Heavyweight (6 rounds)	Unanimous Decision.
(Denmark) Landry Kore	(Bulgaria) Francisco Cordero	Middleweight (4 rounds)	1st-round KO.
(Norway) Kai Robin Havnaa	(Poland) Lukasz Zygmunt	Cruiserweight (4 rounds)	1st-round KO.

== International broadcasting ==
Country	Channel
Denmark	TV3 Sport
Norway	Viasat Sport
Sweden	TV10
