= Mads Larsen (boxer) =

Danish boxer

Personal information
- Nickname: Golden Boy
- Nationality: Danish
- Born: Mads Larsen; 9 February 1973 (age 53) Mårslet, Denmark
- Height: 5 ft 11.5 in (1.82 m)
- Weight: Middleweight; Super middleweight; Light heavyweight

Boxing career
- Reach: 77 in (196 cm)
- Stance: Southpaw

Boxing record
- Total fights: 55
- Wins: 51
- Win by KO: 38
- Losses: 4
- Draws: 0
- No contests: 0

Mads Larsen (born 9 February 1973) is a former professional boxer who competed from 1993 to 2012. He held the IBO super middleweight title from 1997 to 1999. He challenged once for the unified WBA (Super) and IBF super middleweight titles in 2003. At regional level, he held the EBU European super middleweight title in 2003.

== Professional career ==
In October 1993, Larsen turned professional winning his first fight in Storebaelthallen, Korsoer, Denmark on the undercard of a bill that included Danish stars Johnny Bredahl, Jimmy Bredahl and Brian Nielsen. In that fight Larsen beat England's Martin Jolley with a knockout in the fourth round.

=== Title fights ===
After 18 fights and a record of 17 wins and 1 loss (on cuts), Larsen won his first title belt, the vacant IBO world super middleweight title, in May 1997 with a fourth-round knockout win over American Shannon Landberg.

Larsen went on to win his next 10 straight fights, including three defenses of his IBO title. In his next fight in March 1999, Larsen retained his IBO title and also picked up the WBF title with a win over Thulani "Sugar Boy" Malinga with a tenth-round knockout on home turf at the Falconer Centret, Copenhagen.

=== Ottke fight ===
Larsen won his next fifteen fights and remained unbeaten when he signed for his highest profile fight in September 2003 at the Messehalle, Erfurt, Thuringia, in Germany when he challenged fellow unbeaten fighter, the German, Sven Ottke for his WBA and IBF super middleweight titles. However, Larsen suffered the second defeat of his career when Ottke beat Larsen. After a hard-fought fight Larsen lost on points by a majority decision.

Larsen then won a European super middleweight title only one month later, beating German Danilo Haussler on points.

== Break from boxing ==
Following a shoulder injury as well as a promotion dispute, Larsen spent over three years out of the ring and returned in May 2007 after he signed with Sauerland Promotions. Since his return, Larsen has won all his fights and had an EBU title fight scheduled for 16 January 2010 in Aarhus, Denmark. His opponent was originally planned to be Dimitri Sartison, who lost to Mikkel Kessler in a WBA title bout in June 2008.

Larsen made an unsuccessful comeback bid in January 2010, suffering a TKO to Brian Magee. After the fight, Larsen was accused of doping on the basis of a blood-sample, but was later cleared of all charges by the Danish Boxing Association

== Professional boxing record ==
55 fights	51 wins	4 losses
By knockout	38	3
By decision	13	1

No.	Result	Record	Opponent	Type	Round, time	Date	Location	Notes
55	Loss	51–4	(United Kingdom) Luke Blackledge	KO	4 (8), 1:20	12 Jun 2012	(Denmark) Herning Kongrescenter, Herning	
54	Loss	51–3	(United Kingdom) Brian Magee	TKO	7 (12), 0:15	30 Jan 2010	(Denmark) NRGi Arena, Aarhus	For vacant EBU (European) Super Middleweight title.
53	Win	51–2	(Italy) Roberto Cocco	TKO	7 (10), 1:49	20 Dec 2008	(Switzerland) Hallenstadion, Zürich	
52	Win	50–2	(United States) Ross Thompson	UD	8	29 Mar 2008	(Germany) Sparkassen-Arena, Kiel, Schleswig-Holstein	
51	Win	49–2	(Dominican Republic) Emiliano Cayetano	UD	8	27 Oct 2007	(Germany) Messehalle, Erfurt, Thuringia	
50	Win	48–2	(Australia) Nader Hamdan	UD	8	18 Aug 2007	(Germany) Max Schmeling Halle, Prenzlauer Berg, Berlin	
49	Win	47–2	(Argentina) Hector Javier Velazco	UD	8	23 Jun 2007	(Germany) Stadthalle Oldenburg, Zwickau, Sachsen	
48	Win	46–2	(Russia) Vasily Andriyanov	UD	8	8 May 2007	(Spain) Pabellon San Jose, Guadalajara, Castilla-La Mancha	
47	Win	45–2	(Germany) Danilo Häussler	UD	12	4 Oct 2003	(Germany) Stadthalle, Oldenburg, Zwickau, Sachsen	Won EBU (European) Super Middleweight title.
46	Loss	44–2	(Germany) Sven Ottke	MD	12	6 Sep 2003	(Germany) Messehalle, Erfurt, Thuringia	For WBA & IBF Super Middleweight titles.
45	Win	44–1	(Germany) Andy Liebning	KO	5 (8), 2:59	11 Apr 2003	K.B. Hallen, Copenhagen, Denmark	
44	Win	43–1	(Brazil) Roberto Coelho	UD	8	8 Nov 2002	Falconer Centeret, Frederiksberg, Denmark	
43	Win	42–1	(Brazil) Rogerio Cacciatore	KO	2 (8), 0:54	25 Oct 2002	Esbjerg Stadionhal, Esbjerg, Denmark	
42	Win	41–1	(United States) Chris Walsh	TKO	3 (8), 0:01	4 Oct 2002	Holbæk stadionhal, Holbæk, Denmark	
41	Win	40–1	(Democratic Republic of the Congo) Mohamed Siluvangi	UD	8	15 Mar 2002	Viborg Stadionhal, Viborg, Denmark	
40	Win	39–1	(Argentina) Ramon Arturo Britez	UD	8	8 Feb 2002	Falconer Centeret, Frederiksberg, Denmark	
39	Win	38–1	(United States) Jose Spearman	KO	6 (8), 2:59	16 Nov 2001	Roskilde Hallerne, Roskilde, Denmark	
38	Win	37–1	(United States) Anthony Stephens	KO	2 (8), 1:55	9 Mar 2001	K.B. Hallen, Copenhagen, Denmark	
37	Win	36–1	(Jamaica) Lloyd Bryan	TKO	7 (8)	9 Feb 2001	Odense Sports Park, Odense, Denmark	
36	Win	35–1	(Canada) Nick Rupa	TKO	4 (8)	1 Dec 2000	Viborg Stadionhal, Viborg, Denmark	
35	Win	34–1	(United States) Anton Robinson	KO	1 (8), 2:26	3 Nov 2000	K.B. Hallen, Copenhagen, Denmark	
34	Win	33–1	(United States) Danny Phippen	KO	1 (8), 2:59	6 Oct 2000	Næstved Hallen, Næstved, Denmark	
33	Win	32–1	(Argentina) Omar Eduardo Gonzalez	KO	6 (12), 2:08	26 Nov 1999	Viborg Stadionhal, Viborg, Denmark	Retained WBF (Federation) Super middleweight title.
32	Win	31–1	(United States) Roni Martinez	KO	1 (8)	29 Oct 1999	K.B. Hallen, Copenhagen, Denmark	
31	Win	30–1	(Jamaica) Simon Brown	RTD	5 (8), 3:00	1 Oct 1999	Randers Hallen, Randers, Denmark	
30	Win	29–1	(South Africa) Thulani Malinga	RTD	9 (12), 3:00	19 Mar 1999	Falconer Centeret, Frederiksberg, Denmark	Won WBF (Federation) Super middleweight title. Retained IBO Super middleweight title.
29	Win	28–1	(Brazil) Peter Venancio	KO	7 (12)	16 Oct 1998	Aalborghallen, Aalborg, Denmark	Retained IBO Super middleweight title.
28	Win	27–1	(United States) Lee Fortune	TKO	6 (8), 2:56	4 Sep 1998	Kolding-Hallen, Kolding, Denmark	
27	Win	26–1	(United States) Rob Bleakley	TKO	4 (8), 2:50	1 May 1998	Kolding Teater, Kolding, Denmark	
26	Win	25–1	(Argentina) Bruno Ruben Godoy	KO	7 (12), 1:46	20 Mar 1998	Vejlby-Risskov Hallen, Aarhus, Denmark	Retained IBO Super middleweight title.
25	Win	24–1	(Argentina) Hugo Sclarandi	UD	8	27 Feb 1998	Storebaelthallen, Korsør, Denmark	
24	Win	23–1	(United States) Ray Domenge	KO	3 (8), 1:20	13 Feb 1998	Falconer Centeret, Frederiksberg, Denmark	
23	Win	22–1	(South Africa) Soon Botes	TKO	7 (12), 2:54	14 Nov 1997	K.B. Hallen, Copenhagen, Denmark	Retained IBO Super middleweight title.
22	Win	21–1	(United States) Roger Turner	TKO	2 (8), 0:47	3 Oct 1997	Østre Gasværk Teater, Copenhagen, Denmark	
21	Win	20–1	(United States) Carl Jones	KO	1 (8), 1:10	12 Sep 1997	Kolding-Hallen, Kolding, Denmark	
20	Win	19–1	(United States) Melvin Wynn	KO	2 (8), 2:51	5 Jul 1997	(United Kingdom) Kelvin Hall, Glasgow, Scotland	
19	Win	18–1	(United States) Shannon Landberg	KO	4 (12), 2:33	2 May 1997	Randers Hallen, Randers, Denmark	Won vacant IBO Super middleweight title.
18	Win	17–1	(United States) Allen Smith	KO	3 (8), 1:57	14 Mar 1997	Odense Sports Park, Odense, Denmark	
17	Win	16–1	(United States) Larry Kenney	KO	3 (6)	14 Feb 1997	Sundbyoster Hallen, Copenhagen, Denmark	
16	Win	15–1	(United States) Jerry Brown	KO	1 (6), 2:05	24 Jan 1997	Brøndbyhallen, Brøndby, Denmark	
15	Win	14–1	(United States) Tyrone Jackson	UD	6	18 Oct 1996	Idraettens hus, Vejle, Denmark	
14	Win	13–1	(United Kingdom) Lee Crocker	KO	1 (6)	31 May 1996	K.B. Hallen, Copenhagen, Denmark	
13	Loss	12–1	(United Kingdom) Trevor Ambrose	TKO	2 (6)	11 May 1996	(United Kingdom) York Hall, Bethnal Green, London, England	Larsen was stopped with a cut caused by an elbow from Ambrose.
12	Win	12–0	(Mexico) Eduardo Jaquez	KO	3 (8), 2:58	26 Apr 1996	Aalborghallen, Aalborg, Denmark	
11	Win	11–0	(United States) Jose Cataneo	KO	1 (8), 1:57	29 Mar 1996	Brøndbyhallen, Brøndby, Denmark	
10	Win	10–0	(Nigeria) Hunter Clay	RTD	3 (8), 3:00	12 Jan 1996	Falconer Centeret, Frederiksberg, Denmark	
9	Win	9–0	(Mexico) Norberto Bueno	KO	3 (8), 2:31	24 Nov 1995	Randers Hallen, Randers, Denmark	
8	Win	8–0	(United States) Kevin Whaley-El	KO	3 (8)	20 Oct 1995	Cirkusbygningen, Copenhagen, Denmark	
7	Win	7–0	(United States) Tony McCrimmion	TKO	4 (6), 2:55	9 Jun 1995	Bramdrupdam Hallerne, Kolding, Denmark	
6	Win	6–0	(United States) Will Jones	KO	1 (6)	28 Apr 1995	Randers Hallen, Randers, Denmark	
5	Win	5–0	(United Kingdom) Ernie Loveridge	TKO	3 (6), 2:02	17 Mar 1995	K.B. Hallen, Copenhagen, Denmark	
4	Win	4–0	(United Kingdom) Paul Matthews	TKO	4 (6), 0:30	11 Nov 1994	Randers Hallen, Randers, Denmark	
3	Win	3–0	(United Kingdom) Horace Fleary	UD	6	7 Oct 1994	K.B. Hallen, Copenhagen, Denmark	
2	Win	2–0	(United Kingdom) Marvin O'Brien	UD	6	5 Dec 1993	Randers Hallen, Randers, Denmark	
1	Win	1–0	(United Kingdom) Martin Jolley	KO	3 (4), 1:59	29 Oct 1993	Storebaelthallen, Korsør, Denmark	Professional debut.

Achievements
Preceded by Shannon Landberg	IBO super middleweight Champion; 5 February 1997 – November, 1999 (vacates)	Succeeded by Dana Rosenblatt
