= Dennis Ceylan =

Danish boxer (born 1989)

Personal information
- Nickname: The Menace
- Nationality: (Denmark) Danish
- Born: Dennis Villy Ceylan; March 3, 1989 (age 37) Høje Tåstrup, Denmark
- Height: 1.75 m (5 ft 9 in)
- Weight: Featherweight

Boxing career

Boxing record
- Total fights: 24
- Wins: 19
- Win by KO: 8
- Losses: 3
- Draws: 2

Dennis Ceylan (born 3 March 1989) is a Danish professional boxer. He was born in Høje Taastrup, but grew up in Aarhus and is a member of boxing club BK Aarhus. Ceylan is a former EBU European featherweight champion.

As an amateur he competed at the 2012 Summer Olympics as a bantamweight.

In September 2012, Ceylan turned professional with Sauerland fighting at super featherweight.

== EBU title fights ==
=== Ceylan vs. Walsh ===
In October 2016, he won the EBU featherweight title by defeating, the reigning British featherweight champion, Ryan Walsh by split decision. The scorecards read 115–112, 115-112 and 112–117 in favour of Ceylan.

=== Ceylan vs. Lowe ===
It was then announced that the first defense of his title would be against Isaac Lowe, the reigning Commonwealth champion. The fight was set for March 2017, but was stopped prematurely, after there was an accidental clash of heads in the fourth round, leaving Ceylan unable to continue. The fight was therefore declared a technical draw, and Ceylan retained his title.

=== Ceylan vs. Warrington ===
In his next bout, Ceylan fought Josh Warrington in an IBF featherweight title final eliminator. Ceylan lost via a tenth-round knockout.

== Professional boxing record ==
19 Wins (8 knockouts, 11 decisions), 3 Losses, 2 Draws
Res.	Record	Opponent	Type	Rd., Time	Date	Location	Notes
Loss	19–3–2	(Spain) Jesus Sanchez	TKO	5 (12)	19 January 2019	(Denmark) Struer Arena, Struer	For vacant EBU European Union Featherweight Title
Win	19–2–2	(Georgia (country)) Levan Tsiklauri	UD	8	25 August 2018	(Denmark) Struer Arena, Struer	
Loss	18–2–2	(Spain) Jesus Sanchez	KO	2 (8)	10 March 2018	(Denmark) Struer Arena, Struer	
Loss	18–1–2	(United Kingdom) Josh Warrington	TKO	10 (12), 1:43	21 October 2017	(United Kingdom) First Direct Arena, Leeds, Yorkshire	IBF featherweight title final eliminator
Draw	18–0–2	(United Kingdom) Isaac Lowe	TD	4 (12), 2:30	18 March 2017	(Denmark) Ceres Arena, Aarhus	Retained European featherweight title
Win	18–0–1	(United Kingdom) Ryan Walsh	SD	12	15 October 2016	(Denmark) Arena Nord, Frederikshavn	Won vacant European featherweight title
Win	17–0–1	(Colombia) Walter Estrada	TKO	2 (8), 2:43	12 December 2015	(Denmark) Brøndby Hallen, Brøndby	
Win	16–0–1	(Nicaragua) Elvis Guillen	UD	8	12 September 2015	(Denmark) Arena Nord, Frederikshavn	
Win	15–0–1	(Spain) Sergio Prado	UD	10	20 June 2015	(Denmark) Ballerup Super Arena, Ballerup	
Win	14–0–1	(Russia) Dmitry Kirillov	UD	10	14 March 2015	(Denmark) Ballerup Super Arena, Ballerup	
Win	13–0–1	(Spain) Cristian Montilla	TKO	7 (8), 1:34	7 February 2015	(Denmark) Arena Nord, Frederikshavn	
Draw	12–0–1	(Spain) Cristian Montilla	SD	8	16 August 2014	(Germany) Messehalle, Erfurt	
Win	12–0	(Belarus) Dzmitri Agafonau	KO	1 (8), 2:40	3 May 2014	(Germany) Velodrom, Berlin	
Win	11–0	(Spain) Ivan Morote	UD	8	12 April 2014	(Denmark) Blue Water Dokken, Esbjerg	
Win	10–0	(Italy) Daniele Limone	UD	8	1 February 2014	(Denmark) Arena Nord, Frederikshavn	
Win	9–0	(Mexico) Edgar Torres	UD	8	16 November 2013	(Denmark) Musik Teatret, Albertslund	
Win	8–0	(Italy) Emiliano Salvini	TKO	6 (8), 2:23	19 October 2013	(Denmark) Tre-For Arena, Kolding	
Win	7–0	(Denmark) Tommi Schmidt	TKO	1 (8), 1:55	7 September 2013	(Denmark) Arena Nord, Frederikshavn	
Win	6–0	(Bulgaria) Yordan Vasilev	UD	6	15 June 2013	(Denmark) NRGi Arena, Aarhus	
Win	5–0	(Hungary) Nandor Seres	TKO	3 (6), 2:49	27 April 2013	(Germany) Alsterdorfer Sporthalle, Hamburg	
Win	4–0	(Italy) Marco Scalia	KO	1 (4), 1:06	9 February 2013	(Denmark) Blue Water Dokken, Esbjerg	
Win	3–0	(Spain) Antonio Rodriguez	UD	4	8 December 2012	(Denmark) BOXEN, Herning	
Win	2–0	(Belarus) Anton Bekish	UD	4	10 October 2012	(Finland) Ice Hall, Helsinki	
Win	1–0	(Belarus) Artsem Abmiotka	TKO	2 (4), 0:01	22 September 2012	(Denmark) Arena Nord, Frederikshavn	Professional debut.

Regional titles
Vacant Title last held by Oleg Yefimovych	EBU European Featherweight Champion; 15 October 2016 – Present	Incumbent
