= Randall Thompson (disambiguation) =

Randall Thompson (1899–1984) was an American composer, particularly noted for his choral works.

Randal Thompson may also refer to:

- Randall Thompson (boxer) (born 1964), retired Canadian boxer
- Randall Thompson, fictional character in General Hospital
