= Udsen =

Udsen is a surname. Notable people with the surname include:

- Bodil Udsen (1925–2008), Danish actress
- Daniel Udsen (born 1983), Faroese footballer of Danish descent
