= Carl Froch vs. Mikkel Kessler =

Boxing match

- Date: 24 April 2010
- Venue: MCH Arena, Herning, Mid-Jutland, Denmark
- Title(s) on the line: WBC super middleweight championship

Tale of the tape
| Boxer | (United Kingdom) Carl Froch | (Denmark) Mikkel Kessler |
| Nickname | "The Cobra" | "Viking Warrior" |
| Hometown | Nottingham, East Midlands, UK | Copenhagen, Capital Region, Denmark |
| Pre-fight record | 26–0 (20 KO) | 42–2 (32 KO) |
| Age | 32 years, 9 months | 31 years, 1 month |
| Height | 6 ft 1 in (185 cm) | 6 ft 1 in (185 cm) |
| Weight | 167 3/4 lb (76 kg) | 167 lb (76 kg) |
| Style | Orthodox | Orthodox |
| Recognition | WBC; Super Middleweight Champion; The Ring; No. 3 Ranked Super Middleweight | WBC; No. 3 Ranked Super Middleweight; The Ring; No. 4 Ranked Super Middleweight |

Result
- Kessler defeated Froch via unanimous decision

Carl Froch vs. Mikkel Kessler was a professional boxing match contested on 24 April 2010, for the WBC super middleweight championship. The bout was the second match in the second group stage of the Super Six World Boxing Classic.

== Background ==
Froch defeated Andre Dirrell by split decision in his third WBC super-middleweight title defense which was a very controversial win with many believing Dirrell had won. Nevertheless, Froch got the win and the 2 points for his victory. Meanwhile, WBA Champion Kessler was upset in his first Super Six match against Andre Ward who won via an 11th round technical decision.

In the buildup to the fight there were concerns that the Icelandic volcanic ash eruptions would cause the fight to be disrupted, but it went head as planned .

== The fight ==
In a closely fought contest where both men had great moments throughout the fight, Kessler took Froch's title and inflicted Froch's first professional defeat via unanimous decision, the judges scoring the contest by margins of 116–112, 115–113 and 117–111. The scoring was somewhat controversial, as some boxing announcers had scored the fight much closer, with some awarding Froch the win and others scoring it a draw. Froch later stated that the fight was close and that he believes the decision would have gone his way if the event had been held in Nottingham. The fight was a contender for the 2010 Fight of the Year.

== Aftermath ==
In August, Kessler announced he was withdrawing from the Super Six tournament due to the worsening of the eye injury he suffered during his earlier fight against Andre Ward, vacating the WBC belt in the progress. WBC, after initially announcing that it would grant the belt to the winner of the upcoming Group Stage 3 match between its number one contender Andre Dirrell and the WBA champion Ward, it was confirmed that the WBC would grant its championship to the winner of the scheduled match between Froch and Arthur Abraham, which Froch won to retain title.

Froch and Kessler would fight a rematch in 2013, with Froch winning by unanimous decision in London.

== Broadcasting ==
| Country | Broadcaster |
|---|---|
| Hungary | Sport 1 |
| Poland | Polsat |
| Romania | Sport.RO |
| Ukraine | Sport 1 |
| United Kingdom | Primetime |
| United States | Showtime |

== Undercard ==
Confirmed bouts:

| Winner | Loser | Weight division/title belt(s) disputed | Result |
Non-TV bouts
| (Iraq) Koko Murat | (Germany) Nick Klappert | Super Welterweight (8 rounds) | Majority Decision. |
| (Germany) Edmund Gerber | (Serbia) Samir Kurtagic | Heavyweight (8 rounds) | Unanimous Decision. |
| (Denmark) Vinni Skovgaard | (Belgium) Diane Schwachhofer | Welterweight (6 rounds) | Unanimous Decision. |
| (Germany) Thomas Troelenberg | (Italy) Elio Cotena | Middleweight (6 rounds) | Split Decision. |
| (Poland) Lukas Schulz | (Hungary) Viktor Szalai | Cruiserweight (6 rounds) | 3rd-round KO. |
| (Denmark) Patrick Nielsen | (Hungary) Norbert Szekeres | Middleweight (4 rounds) | 4th-round KO. |

| Preceded by vs. Andre Dirrell | Carl Froch's bouts 24 April 2010 | Succeeded by vs. Arthur Abraham |
| Preceded by vs. Andre Ward | Mikkel Kessler's bouts 24 April 2010 | Succeeded by vs. Mehdi Bouadla |
