= Wilfried Sauerland =

German boxing promoter and manager (born 1940)

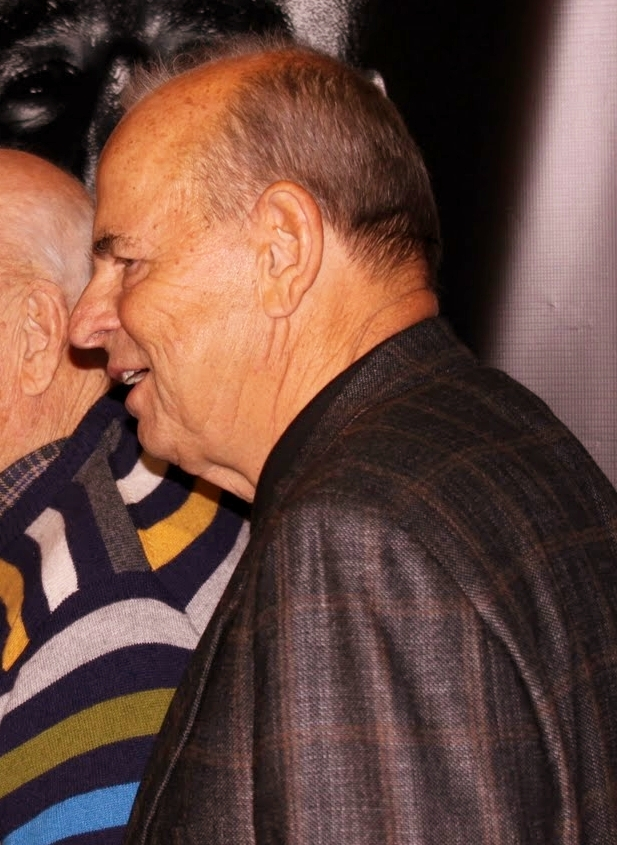
Wilfried Sauerland

Wilfried Sauerland (born 29 February 1940 in Wuppertal) is a German boxing promoter and manager. He was inducted into the International Boxing Hall of Fame in 2010.

== Career ==
Boxing camps associated with Sauerland, have had various locations:

Frankfurt (Oder) with Manfred Wolke and Rudi Fink (2003), Cologne with Ulli Wegner (1996–2004), and in Berlin with Ulli Wegner, since 2004. He has two sons, Kalle Sauerland and Nisse Sauerland who both work for Wasserman.

== Current boxers ==
Boxer	Nationality	Weight	Title
Sophie Alisch	(Germany) German	Featherweight	
Abass Baraou	(Germany) German	Super Welterweight	
Leon Bauer	(Germany) German	Super middleweight	
Leon Bunn	(Germany) German	Light heavyweight	
Filip Hrgović	(Croatia) Croatian	Heavyweight	
Denis Radovan	(Germany) German	Super middleweight	
Katharina Thanderz	(Norway) Norwegian	Super featherweight	
Patrick Wojcicki	(Germany) German	Super middleweight	

Previous boxers

- Arthur Abraham
- Ahmad Kaddour
- Alejandro Berrio
- Alexander Frenkel
- Alexander Povetkin
- Axel Schulz
- Cecilia Brækhus
- Chisanda Mutti
- David Graf
- David Haye
- Dustin Dirks
- Edmund Gerber
- Eduard Gutknecht
- Enad Licina
- Francesco Pianeta
- Henry Akinwande
- Henry Maske
- Jack Culcay
- John Mugabi
- Karo Murat
- Marco Huck
- Markus Beyer
- Mikkel Kessler
- Nikolai Valuev
- Oktay Urkal
- Oleh Platov
- Robert Helenius
- Ruediger May
- Sebastian Sylvester
- Steve Cunningham
- Sven Ottke
- Timo Hoffmann
- Torsten May
- Tyron Zeuge
- Yoan Pablo Hernandez
- Željko Mavrović
- George Groves
- Enrico Kölling
- Artur Mann
- Kubrat Pulev
- Patrick Nielsen
- Anthony Ogogo
- Noel Gevor
- Mikaela Laurén
- Otto Wallin
- Michael Wallisch
- Oscar Ahlin
- Stefan Härtel
- Tomi Honka
- Oliver Flodin
- Mikkel Nielsen
- Abdul Khattab
- Dennis Ceylan
- Tim-Robin Lihaug
- Burak Sahin
- Araik Marutjan
- Micki Nielsen
- Anthony Yigit
- Nieky Holzken
- Klara Svensson
- Hadi Srour
- Albon Pervizaj
- Mikael Lawal
- Frederik Hede Jensen
- Zach Parker
- Dina Thorslund
- Kem Ljungquist
- Vincent Feigenbutz
- Karl Robin Havnaa
