= Brian Magee =

Irish boxer (born 1975)

Personal information
- Born: 9 June 1975 (age 51) Belfast, Northern Ireland
- Height: 6 ft 0 in (183 cm)
- Weight: Super-middleweight; Light-heavyweight

Boxing career
- Reach: 74 in (188 cm)
- Stance: Southpaw

Boxing record
- Total fights: 42
- Wins: 36
- Win by KO: 25
- Losses: 5
- Draws: 1
Medal record
Men's amateur boxing
Representing Ireland
European Championships
| Silver medal – second place | Minsk 1998 | Middleweight |
Representing Northern Ireland
Commonwealth Games
| Bronze medal – third place | Kuala Lumpur 1998 | Middleweight |

Brian Magee (born 9 June 1975) is a Northern Irish former professional boxer who competed from 1999 to 2012. He held the WBA (Regular) super-middleweight title in 2012, and the IBO title from 2001 to 2004. At regional level, he held the British super middleweight title in 2008 and the EBU European title in 2010. As an amateur he represented Ireland at the 1996 Olympics, reaching the middleweight quarter-finals. He also won a silver medal at the 1998 European Championships and bronze at the 1998 Commonwealth Games, representing Northern Ireland in the latter.

== Amateur career ==
As an amateur Magee fought out of holy trinity ABC in Belfast, and won the Ulster senior title every year from 1995 to 1998.

Magee represented Ireland at the 1996 Summer Olympics.

=== Olympic results ===
- Defeated Randall Thompson (Canada) 13–5
- Defeated Bertrand Tetsia (Cameroon) 11–6
- Lost to Mohamed Bahari (Algeria) 9–15

Magee won a bronze medal for Northern Ireland at the 1998 Commonwealth Games and silver medal for Ireland at the 1998 European Championships in Minsk, Belarus.

== Professional career ==
Magee turned professional in March 1999, and fought Dean Ashton at the Bowler's Arena, Manchester, England on the undercard of a bill that included Damaen Kelly, Michael Brodie and Clinton Woods. Magee won his opener knocking out the Stoke man inside two rounds.

He won the vacant IBO Intercontinental super middleweight title in January 2001 by defeating Neil Linford from England. He then won the IBO world super middleweight title and defended it successfully eight times. He was then defeated in his attempt for the European title. In December 2008 he beat undefeated Scottish Stevie Maguire to win the British super middleweight title, and, after a 13-month break, returned to defeat Mads Larsen in a seven-round knockout in Aarhus, becoming European champion for the first time.

On 11 September 2010 Brian Magee defended his European Title against Armenia's Roman Aramian with the Armenian not starting the ninth round. Magee challenged IBF Super-Middleweight champion Lucian Bute in Canada on 19 March 2011. He lost the fight to Lucian Bute by TKO in the tenth round.

On 30 July 2011 Magee captured the interim WBA super-middleweight title with a unanimous points win over Jaime Barboza in San Jose, Costa Rica.

=== Magee vs. Kessler ===
On 8 December 2012. Brian Magee travelled to Denmark to face "The Viking Warrior" Mikkel Kessler in his home nation with the WBA Super Middleweight Title at stake. After a quiet 1st round, Magee went to the floor twice in the 2nd after Kessler landed some hard bodyshots. After 24 seconds on the third round it was allover, Kessler landed a hard bodyshot again; Magee never recovered and Kessler became World Champion for the fifth time.

== Professional boxing record ==
| 42 fights | 36 wins | 5 losses |
|---|---|---|
| By knockout | 24 | 3 |
| By decision | 12 | 2 |
| Draws | 1 | |

| No. | Result | Record | Opponent | Type | Round, time | Date | Location | Notes |
|---|---|---|---|---|---|---|---|---|
| 42 | Loss | 36–5–1 | (Denmark) Mikkel Kessler | TKO | 3 (12), 0:24 | 12 Aug 2012 | Jyske Bank Boxen, Herning, Denmark | Lost WBA (Regular) super-middleweight title |
| 41 | Win | 36–4–1 | (Denmark) Rudy Markussen | TKO | 5 (12), 2:35 | 18 Feb 2012 | Brøndby Hall, Brøndby, Denmark | Retained WBA interim super-middleweight title |
| 40 | Win | 35–4–1 | (Costa Rica) Jaime Barboza | UD | 12 | 30 Jul 2011 | Gimnasio Nacional, San José, Costa Rica | Won vacant WBA interim super-middleweight title |
| 39 | Loss | 34–4–1 | (Romania) Lucian Bute | TKO | 10 (12), 2:04 | 19 Mar 2011 | Bell Centre, Montreal, Quebec, Canada | For IBF super-middleweight title |
| 38 | Win | 34–3–1 | (Armenia) Roman Aramyan | RTD | 8 (12), 3:00 | 9 Nov 2010 | (Republic of Ireland) National Stadium, Dublin, Ireland | Retained European super-middleweight title |
| 37 | Win | 33–3–1 | (Denmark) Mads Larsen | TKO | 7 (12), 0:15 | 30 Jan 2010 | NRGi Arena, Aarhus, Denmark | Won vacant European super-middleweight title |
| 36 | Win | 32–3–1 | (United Kingdom) Steve McGuire | KO | 8 (12), 3:01 | 13 Dec 2008 | (United Kingdom) International Centre, Brentwood, England | Won vacant British super-middleweight title |
| 35 | Win | 31–3–1 | (United Kingdom) Simeon Cover | TKO | 4 (6), 1:04 | 11 Jul 2008 | (United Kingdom) Robin Park Arena, Wigan, England | |
| 34 | Win | 30–3–1 | (United Kingdom) Tyrone Wright | PTS | 6 | 7 Mar 2008 | (United Kingdom) Harvey Hadden Stadium, Nottingham, England | |
| 33 | Win | 29–3–1 | (United Kingdom) Mark Nilsen | PTS | 4 | 8 Feb 2008 | (United Kingdom) Leisure Centre, Peterlee, England | |
| 32 | Draw | 28–3–1 | (United Kingdom) Tony Oakey | MD | 12 | 25 Aug 2007 | (Republic of Ireland) Point Theatre, Dublin, Ireland | For British light-heavyweight title |
| 31 | Win | 28–3 | (United Kingdom) Danny Thornton | RTD | 2 (6), 3:00 | 8 Jun 2007 | (United Kingdom) Civic Centre, Motherwell, Scotland | |
| 30 | Win | 27–3 | (United Kingdom) Andrew Lowe | PTS | 12 | 26 Jan 2007 | (United Kingdom) Goresbrook Leisure Centre, London, England | |
| 29 | Win | 26–3 | (United Kingdom) Paul David | PTS | 6 | 3 Nov 2006 | (United Kingdom) Metrodome, Barnsley, England | |
| 28 | Loss | 25–3 | (United Kingdom) Carl Froch | KO | 11 (12), 1:21 | 26 May 2006 | (United Kingdom) York Hall, Bethnal Green, London, England | For British and Commonwealth super-middleweight titles |
| 27 | Win | 25–2 | (Belarus) Daniil Prakaptsou | TKO | 2 (4), 2:46 | 28 Jan 2006 | (Republic of Ireland) National Stadium, Dublin, Ireland | |
| 26 | Win | 24–2 | (Armenia) Varujan Davtyan | TKO | 2 (8) | 14 Oct 2005 | (Republic of Ireland) National Stadium, Dublin, Ireland | |
| 25 | Loss | 23–2 | (Ukraine) Vitali Tsypko | SD | 12 | 16 Jul 2005 | Nuremberg Arena, Nuremberg, Germany | For vacant European super-middleweight title |
| 24 | Win | 23–1 | (United Kingdom) Neil Linford | TKO | 7 (8), 2:48 | 26 Nov 2004 | (United Kingdom) Leisure Centre, Altrincham, England | |
| 23 | Loss | 22–1 | (United Kingdom) Robin Reid | UD | 12 | 26 Jun 2004 | (United Kingdom) King's Hall, Belfast, Northern Ireland | Lost IBO super-middleweight title |
| 22 | Win | 22–0 | (Nigeria) Jerry Elliot | UD | 12 | 17 Apr 2004 | (United Kingdom) King's Hall, Belfast, Northern Ireland | Retained IBO super-middleweight title |
| 21 | Win | 21–0 | (France) Hacine Cherifi | TKO | 8 (12) | 22 Nov 2003 | (United Kingdom) King's Hall, Belfast, Northern Ireland | Retained IBO super-middleweight title |
| 20 | Win | 20–0 | (Argentina) Omar Eduardo Gonzalez | KO | 1 (12), 1:50 | 4 Oct 2003 | (United Kingdom) Ulster Hall, Belfast, Northern Ireland | Retained IBO super-middleweight title |
| 19 | Win | 19–0 | (South Africa) Andre Thysse | TKO | 10 (12), 2:48 | 21 Jun 2003 | (United Kingdom) MEN Arena, Manchester, England | Retained IBO super-middleweight title |
| 18 | Win | 18–0 | (United States) Miguel Angel Jimenez | UD | 12 | 22 Feb 2003 | (United Kingdom) Leisure Centre, Huddersfield, England | Retained IBO super-middleweight title |
| 17 | Win | 17–0 | (United States) Jose Spearman | UD | 12 | 9 Nov 2002 | (United Kingdom) Leisure Centre, Altrincham, England | Retained IBO super-middleweight title |
| 16 | Win | 16–0 | (South Africa) Mpush Makambi | TKO | 7 (12) | 15 Jun 2002 | (United Kingdom) Town Hall, Leeds, England | Retained IBO super-middleweight title |
| 15 | Win | 15–0 | (Armenia) Vage Kocharyan | PTS | 8 | 18 Mar 2002 | (United Kingdom) Leisure Centre, Crawley, England | |
| 14 | Win | 14–0 | (Argentina) Ramon Arturo Britez | KO | 1 (12), 1:56 | 10 Dec 2001 | (United Kingdom) Everton Park Sports Centre, Liverpool, England | Won IBO super-middleweight title |
| 13 | Win | 13–0 | (Jamaica) Chris Nembhard | TKO | 6 (8), 0:37 | 31 Jul 2001 | (United Kingdom) York Hall, London, England | |
| 12 | Win | 12–0 | (United Kingdom) Neil Linford | UD | 12 | 29 Jan 2001 | (United Kingdom) Bushfield Leisure Centre, Peterborough, England | Won vacant IBO Inter-Continental super-middleweight title |
| 11 | Win | 11–0 | (Georgia (country)) Teymuraz Kekelidze | TKO | 4 (10) | 11 Nov 2000 | (United Kingdom) Waterfront Hall, Belfast, Northern Ireland | |
| 10 | Win | 10–0 | (United Kingdom) Jason Barker | PTS | 8 | 12 Jun 2000 | (United Kingdom) Ulster Hall, Belfast, Northern Ireland | |
| 9 | Win | 9–0 | (United Kingdom) Pedro Carragher | KO | 2 (8) | 15 Apr 2000 | (United Kingdom) York Hall, London, England | |
| 8 | Win | 8–0 | (United Kingdom) Darren Ashton | TKO | 5 (8) | 20 Mar 2000 | (United Kingdom) Leisure Centre, Mansfield, England | |
| 7 | Win | 7–0 | (United Kingdom) Rob Stevenson | TKO | 5 (6), 1:31 | 21 Feb 2000 | (United Kingdom) Elephant and Castle Shopping Centre, London, England | |
| 6 | Win | 6–0 | (United Kingdom) Terry Morrill | TKO | 4 (6) | 12 Feb 2000 | (United Kingdom) Ponds Forge, Sheffield, England | |
| 5 | Win | 5–0 | (United Kingdom) Michael Pinnock | TKO | 3 (6) | 16 Oct 1999 | (United Kingdom) Maysfield Leisure Centre, Belfast, Northern Ireland | |
| 4 | Win | 4–0 | (United Kingdom) Dennis Doyley | TKO | 3 (4), 2:17 | 13 Sep 1999 | (United Kingdom) York Hall, London, England | |
| 3 | Win | 3–0 | (United Kingdom) Chris Howarth | TKO | 1 (4), 1:12 | 22 Jun 1999 | (United Kingdom) Corn Exchange, Ipswich, England | |
| 2 | Win | 2–0 | (United Kingdom) Richard Glaysher | TKO | 1 (4), 2:28 | 22 May 1999 | (United Kingdom) Maysfield Leisure Centre, Belfast, Northern Ireland | |
| 1 | Win | 1–0 | (United Kingdom) Dean Ashton | TKO | 2 (4), 2:23 | 13 Mar 1999 | (United Kingdom) Bowlers Exhibition Centre, Manchester, England | |

Sporting positions
Regional boxing titles
| Vacant Title last held by David Starie | IBO Inter-Continental super-middleweight champion 29 January 2001 – 10 December 2001; Won world title | Vacant Title next held by Hussain Osman |
| Vacant Title last held by Carl Froch | British super-middleweight champion 13 December 2008 – March 2009; Vacated | Vacant Title next held by Tony Quigley |
| Vacant Title last held by Karo Murat | European super-middleweight champion 30 January 2010 – March 2011; Vacated | Vacant Title next held by Piotr Wilczewski |
Minor world boxing titles
| Preceded by Ramon Arturo Britez | IBO super-middleweight champion 10 December 2001 – 26 June 2004 | Succeeded by Robin Reid |
Major world boxing titles
| New title | WBA super-middleweight champion Interim title 30 July 2011 – 9 November 2012; Promoted | Vacant Title next held by Stanyslav Kashtanov |
| Vacant Title last held by Károly Balzsay | WBA (Regular) super middleweight champion 9 November 2012 – 8 December 2012 | Succeeded by Mikkel Kessler |
