= Micki Nielsen =

Danish boxer

Personal information
- Nickname: One Punch
- Nationality: Danish
- Born: 26 February 1993 (age 33) Copenhagen, Denmark
- Height: 1.90 m (6 ft 3 in)
- Weight: Cruiserweight

Boxing career
- Stance: Southpaw

Boxing record
- Total fights: 27
- Wins: 25
- Win by KO: 15
- Losses: 2

Micki Nielsen (born 26 February 1993) is a Danish professional boxer. He challenged for the European cruiserweight title in 2019 and held the WBC Youth and WBC International cruiserweight titles between 2014 and 2016. He is the younger brother of Patrick Nielsen, who is also a professional boxer.

== Professional boxing record ==
27 fights	25 wins	2 losses
By knockout	15	0
By decision	10	2

No.	Result	Record	Opponent	Type	Round, time	Date	Location	Notes
27	Loss	25–2	(Belgium) Yves Ngabu	UD	12	16 Feb 2019	Sporthal Schiervelde, Roeselare, Belgium	For European cruiserweight title
26	Win	25–1	(Latvia) Ricards Bolotniks	SD	8	27 Jan 2018	Arena Riga, Riga, Latvia	
25	Win	24–1	(Ukraine) Taras Oleksiyenko	KO	7 (8), 2:42	27 Oct 2017	Sport and Congress Center, Schwerin, Germany	
24	Win	23–1	(France) Simon Bakalak	UD	8	8 Jul 2017	Friedrich-Ebert-Halle, Ludwigshafen, Germany	
23	Loss	22–1	(South Africa) Kevin Lerena	MD	10	22 Oct 2016	(South Africa) Emperors Palace, Kempton Park, Gauteng, RSA	
22	Win	22–0	(South Africa) Johnny Muller	UD	10	11 Jun 2016	(South Africa) Emperors Palace, Kempton Park, Gauteng, RSA	
21	Win	21–0	(Italy) Mirko Larghetti	UD	12	19 Mar 2016	MusikTeatret, Albertslund, Denmark	Retained WBC International Cruiserweight title.
20	Win	20–0	(Bulgaria) Konstantin Semerdjiev	KO	3 (8), 2:51	12 Dec 2015	Brondby Hallen, Brondby, Denmark	
19	Win	19–0	(Argentina) Alejandro Emilio Valori	KO	4 (10), 2:45	12 Sep 2015	Arena Nord, Frederikshavn, Denmark	
18	Win	18–0	(Belgium) Ismail Abdoul	UD	8	20 Jun 2015	Ballerup Super Arena, Ballerup, Denmark	
17	Win	17–0	(Brazil) Julio Cesar Dos Santos	UD	10	7 Feb 2015	Arena Nord, Frederikshavn, Denmark	Won vacant WBC International Cruiserweight title.
16	Win	16–0	(Venezuela) Gusmyr Perdomo	UD	10	13 Dec 2014	MusikTeatret, Albertslund, Denmark	
15	Win	15–0	(Hungary) Tamas Bajzath	KO	2 (8), 1:52	13 Dec 2014	TAP 1, Copenhagen, Denmark	
14	Win	14–0	(Ukraine) Igor Pylypenko	TKO	3 (8), 0:30	1 Jun 2014	Arena Mytishchi, Mytishchi, Russia	
13	Win	13–0	(Georgia (country)) Gogita Gorgiladze	UD	10	15 Feb 2014	MusikTeatret, Albertslund, Denmark	Won vacant WBC Youth World Cruiserweight title.
12	Win	12–0	(Georgia (country)) Giorgi Tevdorashvili	TKO	2 (6), 2:29	1 Feb 2014	Arena Nord, Frederikshavn, Denmark	
11	Win	11–0	(Germany) Bjoern Blaschke	KO	1 (8), 2:36	13 Dec 2013	MusikTeatret, Albertslund, Denmark	
10	Win	10–0	(Georgia (country)) Sandro Siproshvili	UD	6	16 Nov 2013	Kolding Hallen, Kolding, Denmark	
9	Win	9–0	(Germany) Marko Angermann	TKO	2 (6), 2:38	15 Jun 2013	NRGi Arena, Aarhus, Denmark	
8	Win	8–0	(United Kingdom) Paul Morris	TKO	4 (4), 1:28	25 May 2013	The O2 Arena, Greenwich, United Kingdom	
7	Win	7–0	(Croatia) Toni Visic	TKO	5 (6), 2:41	13 Apr 2013	Arena Nord, Frederikshavn, Denmark	
6	Win	6–0	(Czech Republic) Josef Krivka	KO	1 (6), 0:23	9 Feb 2013	Blue Water Dokken, Esbjerg, Denmark	
5	Win	5–0	(Lithuania) Egidijus Kakstys	UD	4	8 Dec 2012	BOXEN, Herning, Denmark	
4	Win	4–0	(Belarus) Dzianis Vardomsk	TKO	1 (4), 1:35	10 Nov 2012	Ice Hall, Helsinki, Finland	
3	Win	3–0	(Hungary) Attila Szatmari	KO	1 (4), 1:30	18 Feb 2012	Brondby Hallen, Brondby, Denmark	
2	Win	2–0	(Latvia) Romans Mironovs	KO	1 (4), 0:43	17 Dec 2011	Herning Kongrescenter, Herning, Denmark	
1	Win	1–0	(Latvia) Valerijs Rogozins	TKO	1 (4), 1:58	3 Sep 2011	Herning Kongrescenter, Herning, Denmark	
