= Mikkel Kessler vs. Andre Ward =

Boxing match

- Date: 21 November 2009
- Venue: Oracle Arena, Oakland, California, U.S.
- Title(s) on the line: WBA super middleweight championship

Tale of the tape
Boxer	(Denmark) Mikkel Kessler	(United States) Andre Ward
Nickname	"The Viking Warrior"	"S.O.G."
Hometown	Copenhagen, Capital Region, Denmark	Oakland, California, U.S.
Pre-fight record	42–1 (32 KO)	20–0 (13 KO)
Age	30 years, 8 months	25 years, 8 months
Height	6 ft 1 in (185 cm)	6 ft 0 in (183 cm)
Weight	167 lb (76 kg)	166 1/2 lb (76 kg)
Style	Orthodox	Orthodox
Recognition	WBA; Super Middleweight Champion; The Ring; No. 1 Ranked Super Middleweight	WBA; No. 6 Ranked Super Middleweight; The Ring; No. 9 Ranked Super Middleweight

Result
- Ward defeated Kessler by 11th round technical decision

Mikkel Kessler vs. Andre Ward was a professional boxing match contested on 21 November 2009, for the WBA super middleweight championship. The bout was the final match in the first group stage of the Super Six World Boxing Classic, a tournament staged by Showtime to crown a unified world super middleweight champion and took place at Oracle Arena in Oakland, California.

== Background ==
Mikkel Kessler was making the third defense of the World Boxing Association championship he entered the tournament with. Kessler defeated Dimitri Sartison in June 2008 for the title Joe Calzaghe had defeated him for the previous fall; after defeating Kessler, Calzaghe vacated his super middleweight titles to campaign at light heavyweight. Ward was fighting in his first world title bout, after a victory against former two-time world title challenger Edison Miranda.

== The fight ==
Despite Kessler's status as the overall favorite, Ward was able to outpunch the champion and won a unanimous technical decision to win his first world championship. The fight was halted in the eleventh round after Kessler, who suffered cuts due to two controversial headbutts, was ruled unable to continue by the ringside doctor and as per the rules the final score was tabulated at the time of the stoppage. Ward was ahead 98–92, 98–92 and 97–93 at the time of the stoppage. Ward joined Calzaghe as the only fighters at the time to defeat Kessler.

== Aftermath ==
Following the victory, Ward led the Ring Magazine's rankings for super middleweights.

== Fight Card ==
The fight card included the following fights:

Weight Class	Weight		Vs.		Result
Super Middleweight	168 lbs.	Andre Ward	def.	Mikkel Kessler (c)	Rnd 10 TD
Super Welterweight	154 lbs.	Karim Mayfield	def.	Francisco Santana	Rnd 5 TKO
Super Lightweight	140 lbs.	Stan Martyniouk	def.	Anthony Martinez	UD
Super Middleweight	168 lbs.	Tony Hirsch	def.	José Celaya	UD
Super Featherweight	130 lbs.	Mel Crossty	def.	Carlos Herrera	UD

== Broadcasting ==
Country	Broadcaster
Canada	Super Channel
Germany	MDR
Hungary	Sport 1
United Kingdom	Primetime
United States	Showtime

Preceded by vs. Gusmyr Perdomo	Mikkel Kessler's bouts 21 November 2009	Succeeded by vs. Carl Froch
Preceded by vs. Shelby Pudwill	Andre Ward's bouts 21 November 2009	Succeeded by vs. Allan Green
