= Daniel Udsen =

Danish Faroese footballer

Personal information
- Date of birth: 2 September 1983 (age 43)
- Place of birth: Albertslund, Denmark
- Height: 1.77 m (5 ft 9 1/2 in)
- Position: Midfielder

Youth career
- Hvidovre IF

Senior career*
Years	Team	Apps	(Gls)
2002–2005	Albertslund IF		
2005–2007	Greve Fodbold		
2007–2008	Fremad Amager		
2008	FC Amager		
2009	FC Vestsjælland		
2009–2010	Vanløse IF		
2010–2011	EB/Streymur		
2011–2015	FC Helsingør		
2016–2021	FC Græsrødderne		

International career
2010–2011	Faroe Islands	13	(0)
- * Club domestic league appearances and goals

Daniel Udsen (born 2 September 1983) is a former Faroese footballer of Danish descent, whose primary position was in midfield.

== Club career ==
Udsen has previously played for Hvidovre IF and Albertslund IF in Denmark. During his stay at Albertslund he was in the team that won the official Danish Indoor Football championship, after a 5–4 victory in the final against Hellerup IK, at the Aarup Sports Centre in January 2005.

In the summer of 2005, he signed for Greve Fodbold, who were then playing in the Denmark Series. He debuted for the first team in August 2005 against Farum BK (consisting of the FC Nordsjælland reserves) and also scored on his debut. In his first season at the club in the 2005–06 season, he scored 9 goals and helped the team win promotion to the Danish 2nd Division when Greve Football won the Denmark Series Pool 1. In the 2006/07 season, he made 25 appearances and scored 6 goals. During the summer in 2007, he signed a one-year contract with second division club Fremad Amager. Udsen made his first team debut in the second division east match, against local rivals B 1908 at the Sundby Sports Park on 5 August 2007.

On 13 December 2011 he signed a contract with Danish club Elite 3000 Helsingør.

== International career ==
On 3 September 2010, he made his international debut with the Faroe Islands national football team in a Euro 2012 qualifying match against Serbia and was substituted at half-time for Christian Mouritsen.

== Honours ==
Greve Fodbold

- Winner of Denmark Series 2005/06

EB/Streymur

- Faroe Islands Cup: 2010 and 2011
