= Patrick Nielsen =

Danish boxer

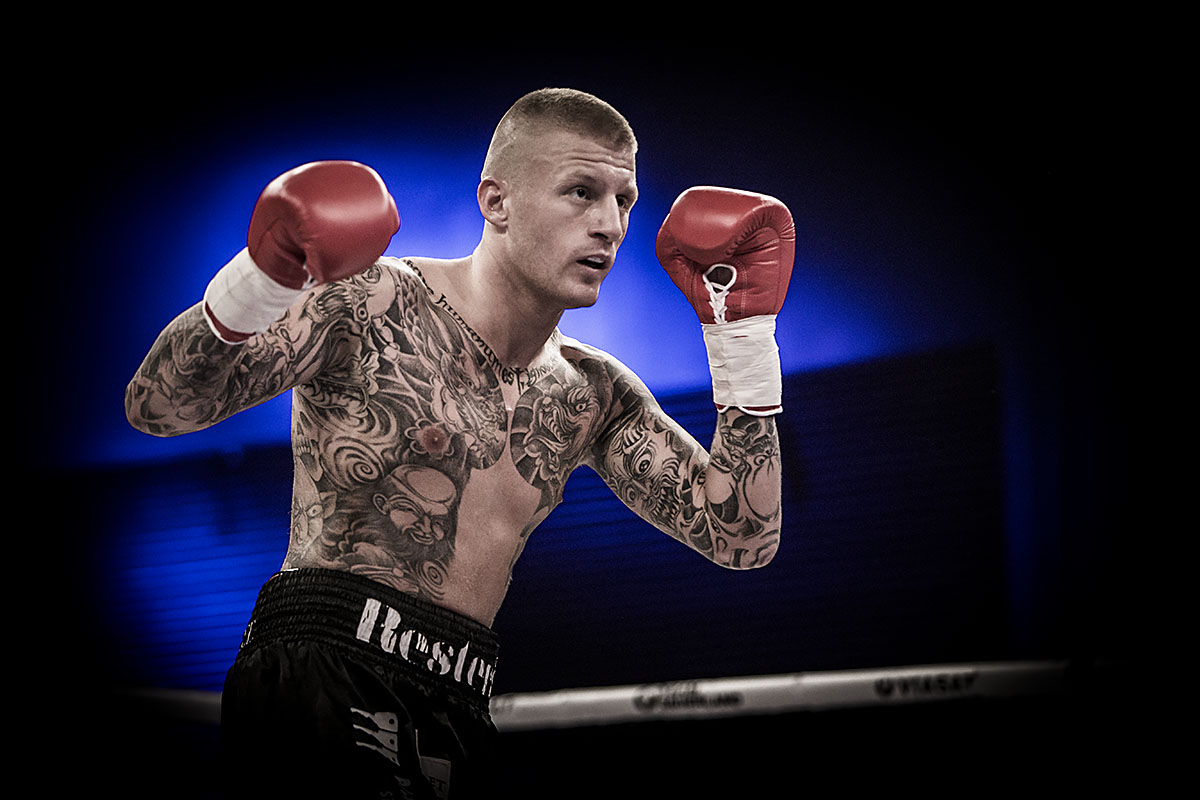

Personal information
- Nationality: Danish
- Born: 23 March 1991 (age 35) Albertslund, Denmark
- Height: 1.83 m (6 ft 0 in)
- Weight: Middleweight; Super-middleweight

Boxing career
- Reach: 185 cm (73 in)
- Stance: Southpaw

Boxing record
- Total fights: 33
- Wins: 30
- Win by KO: 14
- Losses: 3

Patrick Reinhard Nielsen (born 23 March 1991) is a Danish former professional boxer. He is currently a member of the motorcycle club Satudarah MC. He challenged once for the WBA interim middleweight title in 2014. He has been in jail for violently beating the mother of his 2 children and causing life-threatening damages to the victim, which he denied.

He is the older brother of Micki Nielsen, who is also a professional boxer.

== Professional boxing record ==
30 Wins (14 knockouts), 3 Losses, 0 Draws
Result	Record	Opponent	Type	Rd., Time	Date	Location	Notes
Win	30–3	(Armenia) Armen Ypremyan	UD	8	2019-10-5	Gilleleje Hallen, Gilleleje, Denmark	
Loss	29–3	(Germany) Arthur Abraham	SD	12	2018-04-28	Baden-Arena, Offenburg, Germany	For vacant WBO International super middleweight title
Loss	29–2	(United Kingdom) John Ryder	KO	5 (10)	2017-10-14	(United Kingdom) Wembley Arena, London, England	
Win	29–1	(Colombia) Beibi Berrocal	UD	10	2017-01-21	Struer Energi Park, Struer, Denmark	
Win	28–1	(Denmark) Rudy Markussen	TKO	3 (12), 1:24	2015-12-12	Brøndby Hall, Brøndby, Denmark	
Win	27–1	(Brazil) Samir Santos Barbosa	KO	4 (12), 2:57	2015-09-12	Arena Nord, Frederikshavn, Denmark	
Win	26–1	(Ghana) Charles Adamu	UD	12	2015-06-20	Ballerup Super Arena, Ballerup, Denmark	Retained WBA International super middleweight title
Win	25–1	(Argentina) Ruben Eduardo Acosta	UD	10	2015-05-02	Frederiksberg-Hallerne, Frederiksberg, Denmark	
Win	24–1	(United States) George Tahdooahnippah	TKO	8 (12), 3:00	2015-03-14	Ballerup Super Arena, Ballerup, Denmark	Won vacant WBA International super middleweight title
Win	23–1	(Poland) Lucasz Wawrzyczek	UD	10	2014-12-13	MusikTeatret, Albertslund, Denmark	
Loss	22–1	(Russia) Dmitry Chudinov	UD	12	2014-06-01	Mytishchi Arena, Mytishchi, Russia	For WBA Interim Middleweight title.
Win	22–0	(United States) Tony Jeter	KO	2 (12), 1:06	2014-02-15	MusikTeatret, Albertslund, Denmark	Won vacant WBC Silver Middleweight title.
Win	21–0	(Mexico) José Pinzón	TKO	5 (10), 2:59	2013-11-16	MusikTeatret, Albertslund, Denmark	Retained WBA Inter-Continental and WBO Inter-Continental Middleweight titles.
Win	20–0	(Poland) Patrick Majewski	UD	12	2013-09-08	Arena Nord, Frederikshavn, Denmark	Retained WBA Inter-Continental Middleweight title. Won vacant WBO Inter-Continental Middleweight title.
Win	19–0	(Argentina) Crispulo Javier Andino	KO	4 (12), 1:34	2013-06-15	NRGi Arena, Aarhus, Denmark	
Win	18–0	(The Gambia) Patrick Mendy	UD	12	2013-02-09	Blue Water Dokken, Esbjerg, Denmark	Retained WBA Inter-Continental Middleweight title.
Win	17–0	(Belgium) Jamel Bakhi	UD	10	2012-11-10	Hartwall Areena, Helsinki, Finland	Retained WBA Inter-Continental Middleweight title.
Win	16–0	(Spain) Jose Yebes	UD	12	2012-09-22	Arena Nord, Frederikshavn, Denmark	Retained WBA Inter-Continental Middleweight title.
Win	15–0	(Italy) Gaetano Nespro	UD	6	2012-05-20	Parken, Copenhagen, Denmark	
Win	14–0	(Argentina) Gaston Alejandro Vega	KO	10 (12), 1:05	2012-04-21	Arena Nord, Frederikshavn, Denmark	Won vacant WBA Inter-Continental Middleweight title.
Win	13–0	(Hungary) Jozsef Matolcsi	KO	1 (8), 0:11	2012-02-18	Brøndby Hallen, Brøndby, Denmark	
Win	12–0	(Germany) Michael Schubov	UD	10	2011-12-17	Herning Kongrescenter, Herning, Denmark	Won vacant IBF Youth Middleweight title.
Win	11–0	(Uganda) Farouk Daku	UD	8	2011-09-03	Herning Kongresscenter, Herning, Denmark	
Win	10–0	(Republic of Ireland) Joe Rea	TKO	3 (8), 2:30	2011-06-04	Parken, Copenhagen, Denmark	
Win	9–0	(United Kingdom) Gary Boulden	UD	8	2011-04-02	Herning Kongresscenter, Herning, Denmark	
Win	8–0	(Georgia (country)) Erik Avlastimov	UD	6x2	2011-02-12	Herning Kongresscenter, Herning, Denmark	
Win	7–0	(Albania) Adnan Salihu	UD	6x2	2010-11-20	Herning Kongresscenter, Herning, Denmark	
Win	6–0	(Hungary) Laszlo Haaz	TKO	1 (6), 0:59	2010-08-21	Messehalle, Erfurt, Thüringen, Germany	
Win	5–0	(Hungary) Janos Varga	TKO	4 (6x2), 1:11	2010-05-15	Herning Kongresscenter, Herning, Denmark	
Win	4–0	(Hungary) Norbert Szekeres	KO	4 (4), 0:54	2010-04-24	MCH Messecenter Herning, Herning, Denmark	
Win	3–0	(Italy) Alessandro Segurini	UD	4	2010-03-13	Max Schmeling Halle, Berlin, Germany	
Win	2–0	(Hungary) Gabor Balogh	TKO	1 (4), 2:20	2009-11-13	EKZ "Helle Mitte", Berlin, Germany	
Win	1–0	(Hungary) Zoltan Borovics	TKO	1 (4), 1:18	2009-09-12	MCH Messecenter Herning, Herning, Denmark	Professional debut.
