= Randall Thompson (boxer) =

Canadian boxer

Randall Thompson (born June 14, 1964 in Halifax, Nova Scotia) is a retired boxer from Canada, who competed in the middleweight (< 75 kg) division at the 1996 Summer Olympics in Atlanta, Georgia. There he was stopped in the first round by Ireland's Brian Magee.
