= Esbjerg Stadionhal =

Former indoor arena in Esbjerg, Denmark

Esbjerg Stadionhal was an indoor arena located in Esbjerg, Denmark. It opened in 1968 and had a capacity of 2,100 people. Its primary tenant was Team Esbjerg. It also hosted non-sporting events such as exhibitions, fairs and concerts. In 2012 it was replaced by Blue Water Dokken.

== See also ==
- Blue Water Arena
- Esbjerg Skøjtehal
