= Aalborghallen =

Coordinates: 57°02′37″N 09°54′49″E

Aalborg Kongres & Kultur Center (formally and unofficially Aalborghallen) is an entertainment and convention venue located in Aalborg, Denmark, which is used for exhibitions and concerts. The facility was inaugurated in 1953 and has a capacity of 3,000 people.

The first Aalborghall was built in 1933. The hall was used by German troops during the German occupation of Denmark and burnt down in 1941. The Aalborg tower that was built in connection to the hall still stands. A new hall was erected in 1953. The architects were Arne Kjær, Otto Frankild and Preben Hansen. The hall included a theatre built on the model of the Old Stage of the Royal Danish Theatre.

In 1990, Europahallen was built near Aalborghallen and in a major renovation in 2002 the two halls were connected.

The Royal Danish Theatre, the Danish National Chamber Orchestra and Circusrevyen are among the companies that regularly have visited Aalborghallen.

Notable artists that have performed at the center include Elton John, Procol Harum, Sting and Rainbow.

Since 2001, Aalborghallen has been one of the venues for the Aalborg Opera festival that is arranged yearly in March.

Teaterbio was started as the first Danish Art Cinema outside Copenhagen in 1967, but closed in 1980.

The exhibition area is 7000 m2 and for congresses there are 40 smaller rooms and three larger of which the largest can accommodate 2,000 people.
