= Albertslund =

Suburb of Copenhagen, Denmark

- Town
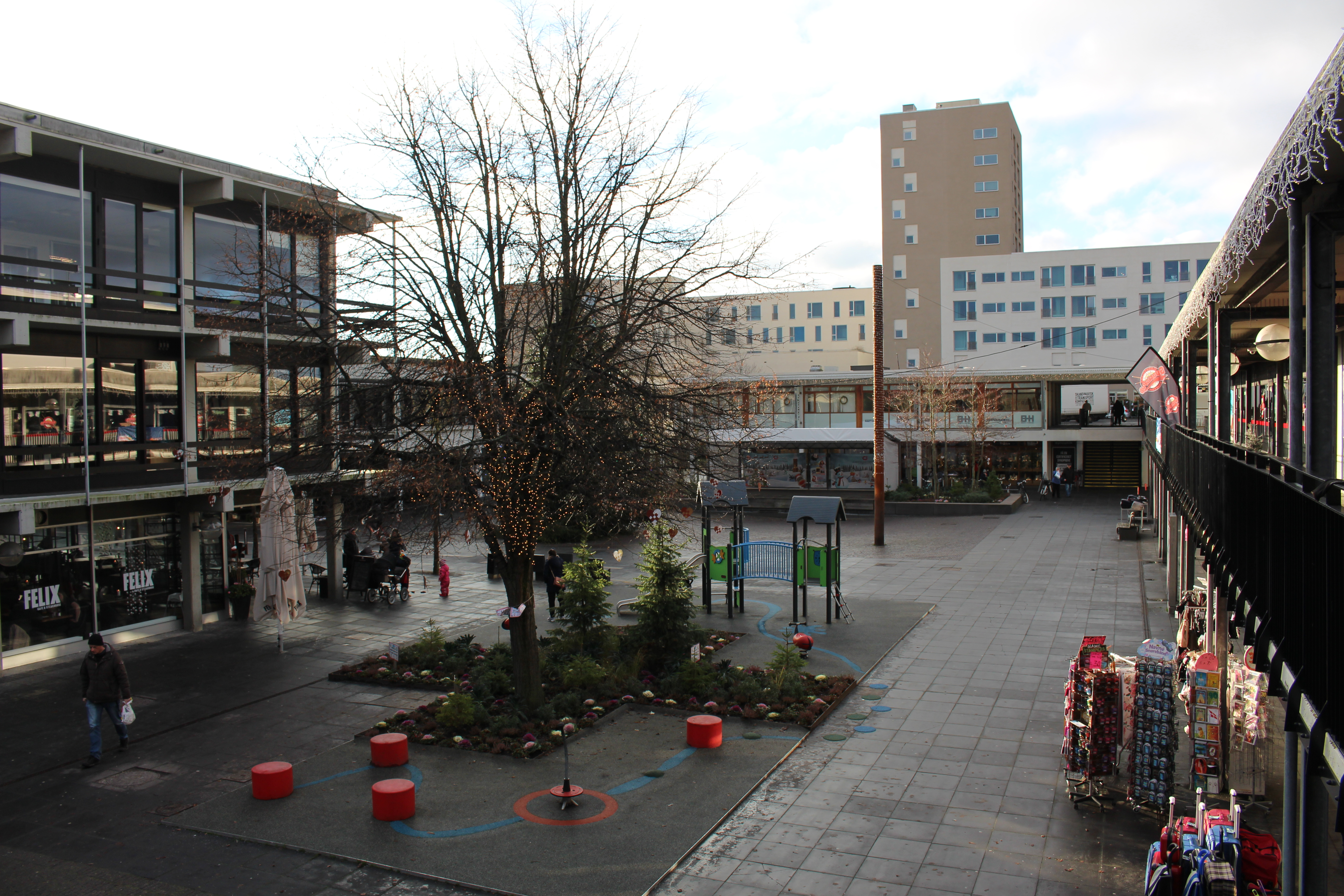
- Albertslund Centrum

- Location in Greater Copenhagen
- Coordinates: 55°39′35″N 12°21′42″E
- Country: Denmark
- Region: Capital Region
- Municipality: Albertslund
- Time zone: UTC+1 (CET)
  - Summer (DST): UTC+2 (CEST)

Albertslund is a Copenhagen suburb in Albertslund Municipality, Denmark. It is located 15 km (9.3 mi) west of central Copenhagen, with a population of around 30,000.

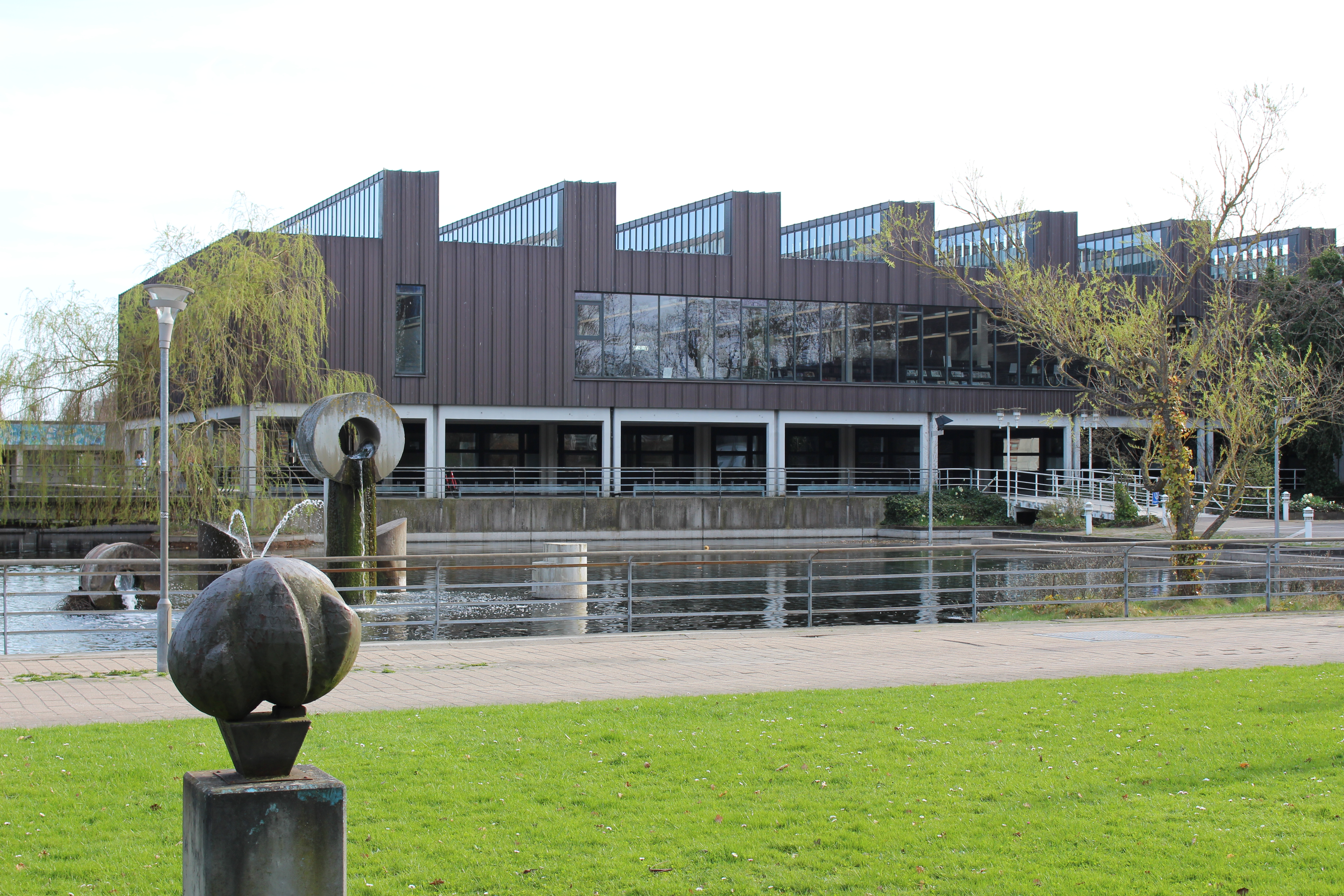
Albertslund Main Library

Albertslund is a planned community or new town mainly built in the 1960s and 1970s. The suburb is known for its experimental and innovative low rise urban planning, integrating water and green spaces in the architecture.

Albertslund is served by Albertslund railway station, located on the Taastrup radial of Copenhagen's S-train network. The station is integrated with Albertslund's open-air shopping centre, Albertslund Centrum.

== Etymology ==
Albertslund (English: Albert's Grove) is named after the large farm Albertslund located in the area now covered by Albertslund Centrum and Albertslund Syd. The farm itself was named for the French count Albert de Rault de Ramsault de Tortonval (1778-1855), who fled to Denmark from France in 1801 because of the French Revolution. In 1817, he bought a farm in the village of Vridsløselille between Copenhagen and Roskilde. The farm was demolished in the 1960s to make way for the construction of the new town of Albertslund, and in 1973 it was decided to change the name of the municipality to Albertslund Municipality.

Colloquially, the town is also referred to as A-town or Lunden (English: the Grove).

== History ==
On 25 September 2020 a strong tornado hit albertslund along a 4.4 kilometer long and 220 meter wide path. The ESSL rated the tornado Low-End IF2 on the International Fujita scale. Moderate - Considerable roof and tree damage occurred. Roofs tiles were ripped off homes, large trees were snapped or uprooted & a 600 kg trailer were overturned. Multiple healthy trees were snapped, including a birch tree, which resulted in the IF2− rating. A tree was also ripped off the ground and dragged 2 meters & trampolines were thrown long distances. 2 schools were damaged.

- website

== Notable people ==
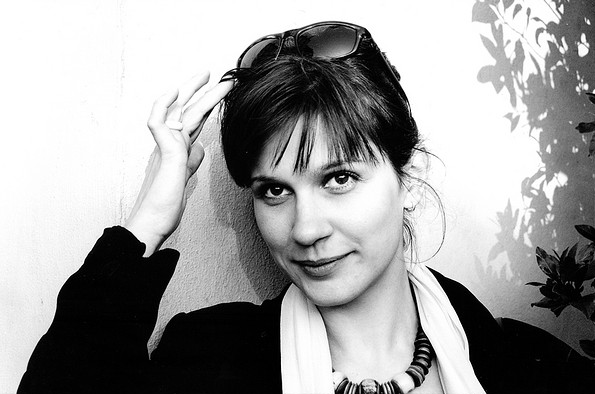
Birgithe Kosovic, 2007

- Viggo Stuckenberg (1863 in Vridsløselille – 1905) a Danish poet of lyrical and emotional poems
- Amin Jensen (born 1970) a Danish actor and comedian, brought up in Albertslund
- Birgithe Kosovic (born 1972) a Danish journalist and author
- Anders Matthesen (born 1975) a Danish stand-up comedian, actor and rapper
- Jim Lyngvild (born 1978) a Danish designer, fashion columnist and TV personality, brought up in Albertslund.
- Troels Nielsen (born 1982), stage name Troo.L.S, a Danish musician and music producer
- Phlake (formed 2010) a Danish R&B and soul group

=== Sport ===
- Hans Rønne (1887–1951) a Danish gymnast, team gold medallist at the 1920 Summer Olympics
- Jesper Håkansson (born 1981) a Danish former footballer with 150 club caps
- Daniel Udsen (born 1983 ) a former Faroese footballer of Danish descent
- Patrick Nielsen (born 1991) a Danish former professional boxer
- Elena Rigas (born 1996) a Danish inline and speed skater, flag-bearer for Denmark at the 2018 Winter Olympics
- Mads Juel Andersen (born 1997) a Danish footballer who plays for English Premier League club Luton Town
