= Mehdi Bouadla =

French boxer

Personal information
- Nickname: The Brave Heart
- Nationality: French; Algerian
- Born: 2 February 1982 (age 44)
- Weight: Middleweight; Super-middleweight

Boxing career
- Stance: Orthodox

Boxing record
- Total fights: 38
- Wins: 32
- Win by KO: 11
- Losses: 6

Mehdi Bouadla (born 2 February 1982) is a French-Algerian professional boxer. He has challenged once each for a middleweight world title and the European super-middleweight title.

== Professional career ==
Bouadla made his professional debut on 15 October 2003, scoring a second-round corner retirement over Rachid Mokhtari. Fighting mainly in France for the next eight years, Bouadla won the France super-middleweight title and defended it twice, as well as winning various WBA, IBF and WBO regional titles. On 4 June 2011, he faced veteran former world champion Mikkel Kessler for the European super-middleweight title, but was stopped in six rounds.

The following year, on 15 December, Bouadla fought for his first world title against WBO super-middleweight champion Arthur Abraham, who won via eighth-round stoppage. 2013 and early 2014 saw Bouadla pick up four straight wins, each a six-round points decision. Another chance at a world championship—this time the WBA interim middleweight title—came on 9 August 2014, against undefeated prospect Dmitry Chudinov. Once again Bouadla was unsuccessful, as he was stopped in three rounds.

== Professional boxing record ==
38 fights	32 wins	6 losses
By knockout	11	3
By decision	20	3
By disqualification	1	0

No.	Result	Record	Opponent	Type	Round, time	Date	Location	Notes
38	Win	32–6	Attila Tibor Nagy	UD	6	2 Nov 2018	Salle Pierre Scohy, Aulnay-Sous-Bois, France	
37	Win	31–6	Yoann Bloyer	PTS	6	31 Mar 2016	Salle Hacène Harcha, Algiers, Algeria	
36	Loss	30–6	Dmitry Chudinov	TKO	3 (12), 1:15	9 Aug 2014	Open-Air Bike Show, Sevastopol	For WBA interim middleweight title
35	Win	30–5	Yoann Bloyer	UD	6	27 Feb 2014	Hpark, Clermont-Ferrand, France	
34	Win	29–5	Attila Tibor Nagy	UD	6	14 Dec 2013	Salle Pierre Scohy, Aulnay-Sous-Bois, France	
33	Win	28–5	Lorenzo Cosseddu	UD	6	15 Feb 2013	Salle des fêtes, Carouge, Switzerland	
32	Win	27–5	Norbert Szekeres	UD	6	2 Feb 2013	Salle Pierre Scohy, Aulnay-Sous-Bois, France	
31	Loss	26–5	Arthur Abraham	TKO	8 (12), 2:11	15 Dec 2012	Nuremberg Arena, Nuremberg, Germany	For WBO super-middleweight title
30	Win	26–4	Gary Abajyan	PTS	8	26 May 2012	Salle Pierre Scohy, Aulnay-Sous-Bois, France	
29	Win	25–4	Andrejs Loginovs	PTS	6	28 Apr 2012	Centre Sportif Béatrice Hess, La Courneuve, France	
28	Win	24–4	Samir Santos Barbosa	UD	12	21 Oct 2011	Salle Pierre Scohy, Aulnay-Sous-Bois, France	Won vacant WBA International middleweight title
27	Win	23–4	Dmitri Protkunas	TKO	1 (6), 2:20	16 Sep 2011	Night Club Faraon, Riga, Latvia	
26	Loss	22–4	Mikkel Kessler	TKO	6 (12), 2:25	4 Jun 2011	Parken Stadium, Copenhagen, Denmark	For vacant WBO European super-middleweight title
25	Win	22–3	Pavels Lotahs	UD	8	29 Jan 2011	Salle Pierre Scohy, Aulnay-Sous-Bois, France	
24	Win	21–3	Ruslans Pojonisevs	UD	6	4 Dec 2010	Salle Ibn Yassine, Rabat, Morocco	
23	Win	20–3	Sergei Melis	KO	4 (12)	9 Oct 2010	Salle Pierre Scohy, Aulnay-Sous-Bois, France	Retained IBF International super-middleweight title; Won vacant WBO Inter-Continental super-middleweight title
22	Win	19–3	Francisco Antonio Mora	RTD	5 (12)	22 Jan 2010	Salle Pierre Scohy, Aulnay-Sous-Bois, France	Won vacant IBF International super-middleweight title
21	Win	18–3	Morrade Hakkar	RTD	6 (10)	31 Oct 2009	Salle Pierre Scohy, Aulnay-Sous-Bois, France	Retained France super middleweight title
20	Win	17–3	Anthony Prunier	RTD	9 (10)	3 Jul 2009	Palais des sports Marcel-Cerdan, Levallois-Perret, France	Retained France super middleweight title
19	Win	16–3	Mehdi Amar	UD	10	28 Feb 2009	Salle Pierre Scohy, Aulnay-Sous-Bois, France	Won France super-middleweight title
18	Win	15–3	Roman Vanicky	PTS	8	22 Nov 2008	Salle Pierre Scohy, Aulnay-Sous-Bois, France	
17	Loss	14–3	Karim Camara	RTD	4 (6)	31 May 2008	Salle Pierre Scohy, Aulnay-Sous-Bois, France	
16	Win	14–2	Kamel Belhachemi	KO	6 (6)	17 May 2008	Palais des Sports, Tours, France	
15	Win	13–2	Laurent Goury	PTS	8	5 Apr 2008	Gymnase Jean Macé, Issoudun, France	
14	Win	12–2	Affif Belghecham	MD	6	21 Feb 2008	Cirque d'hiver, Paris, France	
13	Loss	11–2	Gennady Golovkin	UD	8	7 Sep 2007	Burg-Wächter Castello, Düsseldorf, Germany	
12	Win	11–1	Guy Dia Njoh	RTD	4 (6)	19 May 2007	Salle Pierre Scohy, Aulnay-Sous-Bois, France	
11	Win	10–1	Abdelkahim Derghal	PTS	8	23 Mar 2007	Gymnase Pierre Jablonsky, Châteauroux, France	
10	Win	9–1	Laurent Goury	PTS	6	4 Nov 2006	Saint-Nazaire, France	
9	Win	8–1	Michael Henrotin	MD	6	1 Nov 2005	Sporthal, Izegem, Belgium	
8	Loss	7–1	Laurent Goury	PTS	6	28 May 2005	Saint-Nazaire, France	
7	Win	7–0	Philippe Mendy	PTS	4	17 May 2005	Parc des Sports et Loisirs, Pont-Audemer, France	
6	Win	6–0	Fares Guerrout	DQ	3 (6)	9 Apr 2005	Aulnay-sous-Bois, France	
5	Win	5–0	Tarek Kaidouri	PTS	4	7 Jan 2005	Pont-Sainte-Maxence, France	
4	Win	4–0	Rabah Touati	TKO	1 (6)	29 May 2004	Eaubonne, France	
3	Win	3–0	Slavisa Iskrenov	KO	1 (4)	3 Apr 2004	Pont-Sainte-Maxence, France	
2	Win	2–0	Mounir Sahli	PTS	4	6 Mar 2004	Aulnay-sous-Bois, France	
1	Win	1–0	Rachid Mokhtari	RTD	2 (4)	15 Oct 2003	Aulnay-sous-Bois, France	Professional debut

Sporting positions
Regional boxing titles
Preceded by Mehdi Amar	France super-middleweight champion 28 February 2009 – 2010; Vacated	Vacant Title next held by Christopher Rebrassé
Vacant Title last held by Jean-Paul Mendy	IBF International super-middleweight champion 22 January 2010 – 2011; Vacated	Vacant Title next held by Ünsal Arik
Vacant Title last held by Eduard Gutknecht	WBO Inter-Continental super-middleweight champion 9 October 2010 – 2011; Vacated	Vacant Title next held by Piotr Wilczewski
Vacant Title last held by Hassan N'Dam N'Jikam	WBA International middleweight champion 21 October 2011 – 2012; Vacated	Vacant Title next held by Dmitry Chudinov
