= Brøndbyhallen =

Sports arena

Coordinates: 55°38′46″N 12°25′05″E

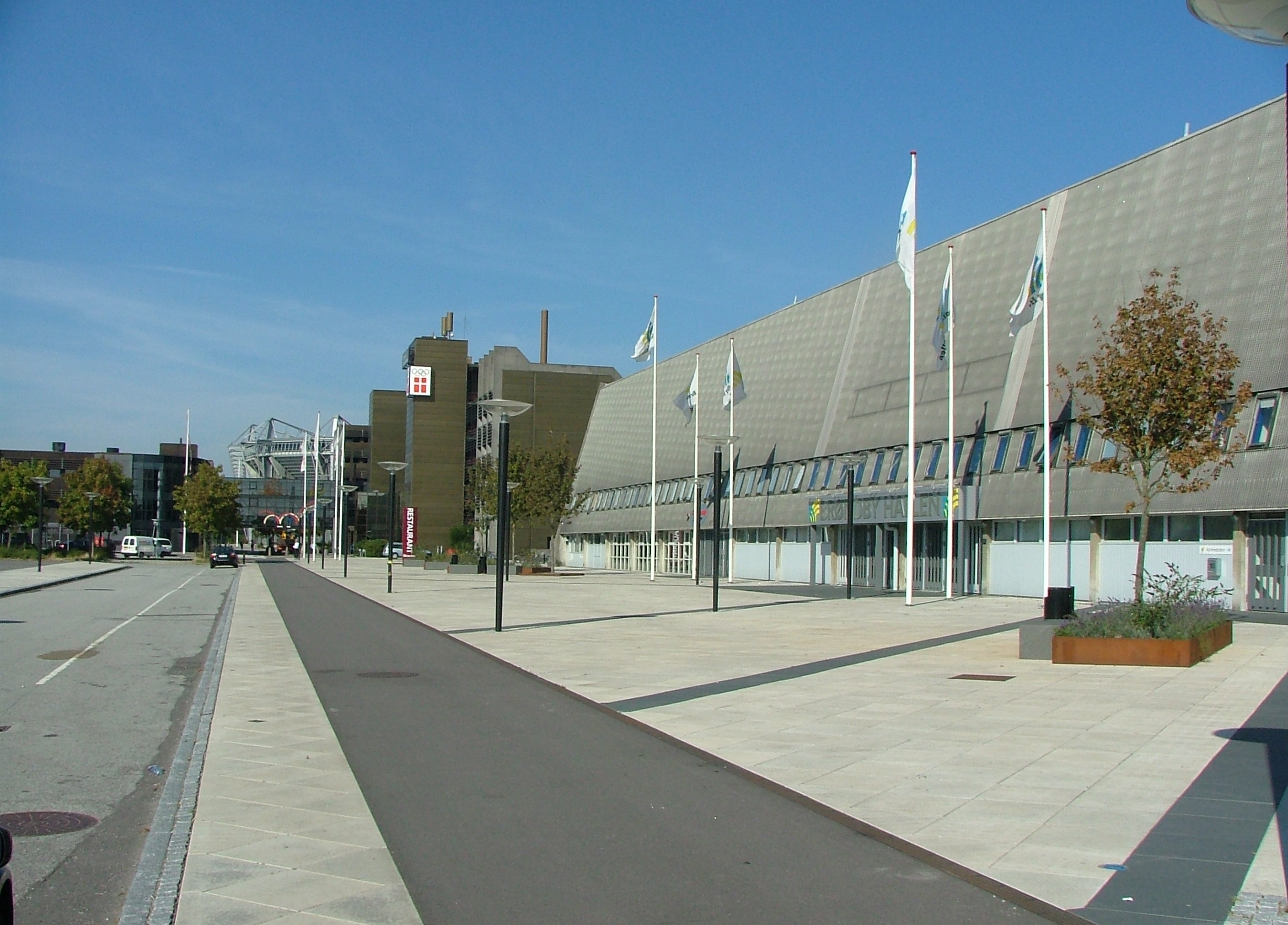
- Interactive map of Brøndbyhallen
- Location: Brøndby, Copenhagen, Denmark
- Capacity: 4,500

Construction
- Opened: 1973

Tenant
- København Håndbold (Champions League)

Brøndbyhallen is an indoor arena located in Brøndby, Denmark, near Copenhagen. The arena holds 4,500 people.

== List of significant tournaments hosted ==
While primarily used for team handball and concerts, it also hosted:

- 1978 World Men's Handball Championship
- 1982 World Figure Skating Championships
- 1983 IBF World Championships
- 1994 European Figure Skating Championships
- 1996 European Women's Handball Championship
- 2014 European Men's Handball Championship

== See also ==
- List of indoor arenas in Denmark
- List of indoor arenas in Nordic countries
