= Carl Froch vs. George Groves =

Boxing competition

Battle of Britain
- Date: 23 November 2013
- Venue: Manchester Arena, Manchester, England
- Titles on the line: IBF and WBA (Regular) super-middleweight titles

Tale of the tape
Boxer	Carl Froch	George Groves
Nickname	"The Cobra"	"Saint"
Hometown	Nottingham, England	London, England
Pre-fight record	31–2 (22 KO)	19–0 (15 KO)
Age	36 years, 4 months	25 years, 7 months
Height	6 ft 1 in (185 cm)	5 ft 11 1/2 in (182 cm)
Weight	167 3/4 lb (76 kg)	166 1/2 lb (76 kg)
Style	Orthodox	Orthodox
Recognition	IBF and WBA (Regular) super-middleweight champion The Ring No. 1 ranked super-middleweight	WBA No. 2 ranked super-middleweight IBF and The Ring; No. 5 Ranked super-middleweight

Result
- Froch wins by technical knockout in round 9

Carl Froch vs. George Groves, billed as the Battle of Britain, was a professional boxing match contested on 23 November 2013 at the Manchester Arena. Carl Froch, the defending unified World Boxing Association (WBA) (Regular version) and International Boxing Federation (IBF) super-middleweight champion, defeated George Groves via technical knockout in the ninth round, although the ending was mired in controversy.

== Background ==
Carl Froch began 2013 by successfully defending his IBF super-middleweight title against WBA (Regular) champion Mikkel Kessler on 25 May, which was a rematch of their first fight on 24 April 2010, at the time part of the Super Six World Boxing Classic tournament. Having unified the titles and become a two-time world champion, Froch considered several options for his next fight. His preference was a third fight with Kessler, based on the resounding critical success of the second, as well as a rematch with former Super Six rival Andre Ward, who defeated Froch in the tournament final on 17 December 2011.

George Groves had won three fights in 2013, including a victory on the undercard of Froch–Kessler II. By June, he was ranked number two at super-middleweight by the WBA and was installed as the mandatory challenger by the IBF. The rivalry between him and Froch had already begun prior to the Kessler fight, when Groves joined Kessler's training camp as a sparring partner. This drew furious criticism from Froch a week before that fight, who branded Groves a traitor for helping out his Danish opponent and not staying loyal to his countryman. In response, Groves maintained that he had gained invaluable experience by sparring against a multiple-time world champion veteran in Kessler.

=== Build-up ===
Once Groves became the mandatory contender for the IBF title, Froch began considering him as a serious opponent for later in the year. Matchroom Boxing promoter Eddie Hearn had mentioned a potential Froch–Groves fight as early as March, which turned into more serious discussions in July, during which time Froch declared his intention to defend his title rather than vacate it for the sake of a potentially bigger fight with Kessler or Ward. Hearn officially announced the event on 30 August, to take place on 23 November at the Manchester Arena (then known as the Phones4u Arena). Matchroom had promoted Froch since 2011, and Groves was signed in March 2013.

Throughout the latter half of the year, Froch and Groves engaged in an intense war of words, rife with trash-talk, in a rivalry likened to that of Nigel Benn vs. Chris Eubank in the early 1990s. On 8 November, both boxers appeared on Sky Sports' boxing talk show Ringside. During the show, Groves insisted on referring to Froch by his second name only, while Froch refused to even look at him. Neither accepted the offer of a handshake. In Groves' training camp, preparations hit a major stumbling block when he and trainer Adam Booth split acrimoniously in September. Groves would reveal in December 2015 that he felt Booth had abandoned him at the most important stage of his career, before a world title fight. With ten weeks to go before the fight with Froch, Paddy Fitzpatrick was hired by Groves to replace Booth.

At the weigh-in on 22 November, which culminated in both boxers having to be pulled apart by security and personnel, Froch was highly animated during the customary staredown as he taunted an "uncharacteristically quiet" Groves. They weighed in under the super-middleweight limit of 168 lb (76 kg): Froch at 167 3/4 pounds (76.1 kg) and Groves at 166 1/2 lb (75.5 kg).

== Fight details ==
Groves entered the arena to "Spitfire" by The Prodigy, and Froch to "Morning Glory" by Oasis. The crowd was overwhelmingly in support of Froch, but Groves would ultimately win them over by the end of the night after his performance in the ring. In the opening round, Groves surprised observers by charging at Froch, who was normally considered the more natural aggressor in his fights. Froch, too, was evidently surprised by this tactic and chose to fight more cautiously than usual until the final moments of the round. Sensing that he was about to lose the round having fought too defensively, Froch opened up and tried to land punches of his own. Groves responded by catching him with a quick, hard overhand right which knocked down Froch for only the second time in his career (the first being against Jermain Taylor in their 2009 fight). Despite being known for his iron chin, Froch was seriously hurt and only just made it out of the round.

The ensuing rounds saw Groves—who was eleven years younger than Froch—outboxing him and consistently landing clean punches, as the prospect of a major upset was brewing. In round six, both boxers exchanged heavy punches with the harder-hitting Froch focusing on body shots, while the quicker-handed Groves targeted the head. More of the same followed in the seventh and eighth rounds, but one reporter noted that referee Howard Foster was intervening too often with the action when it appeared that Groves was running out of steam. This came to a head in round nine when Froch landed several right hands to Groves' head and body, making him stumble around the ring on unsteady legs. Groves momentarily tried to clinch, but was sent back against the ropes by more straight right hands from Froch. It was at this point that Foster jumped in to stop the fight at 1 minute 33 seconds, grabbing Groves in a headlock to pull him away from Froch. All three judges had Groves ahead on their scorecards: 78–73, 76–75, and 76–75.

== Aftermath ==
Immediately the result was heavily protested by Groves, his team, and onlookers alike, in what was seen as a hugely controversial ending to an exciting fight. The crowd in the arena, who had earlier booed Groves, instead directed their vitriol towards Froch. Afterwards, Froch said: "He was a tough, tough fighter. But when he started getting hit, he started to fall apart. I broke him down in seven and eight, and I stopped him in round nine." Regarding the stoppage, he said: "Howard Foster did a fantastic job in stopping it and saving his career. ... George Groves turned his back on me and was slumping down to the floor, his arms were collapsed and his head was hanging and he wasn't defending himself. So I don't think the referee had any choice but to stop the fight."

Groves disagreed vehemently: "It was a terrible, terrible, decision. At no point was I on shaky legs, my head was clear. ... The referee is supposed to stop the fight when you're in a dangerous position and can't protect yourself. If I'm making the guy miss and I'm still firing back that means I'm still conscious that I'm in the fight and that I'm doing the right things." The British Boxing Board of Control expressed their support for Foster in his decision to stop the fight when he did.

Demand for a rematch was immediate, with Froch expressing willingness to give Groves another chance: "I'm happy to honour the fans, honour the crowd, honour George Groves with a rematch if my promoter and my trainer both agree that it makes sense. I don't swerve or duck anybody, everybody knows that." Groves said, "I'd love a rematch. Carl sat down ringside [in a joint post-fight interview] and said let's have it, but watching it back I think he said it because he was hoping for a cheer from the crowd. He probably doesn't want one. I deserve a rematch, for everything I put into the build-up to this." The rematch took place the following year.

== Undercard ==
Confirmed bouts:

- Scott Quigg defeated Diego Oscar Silva – TKO 2
- Rocky Fielding defeated Luke Blackledge – TKO 1
- Anthony Crolla defeated Stephen Foster – RTD 6
- Stephen Smith defeated Sergio Manuel Medina – KO 8
- Jamie McDonnell defeated Bernard Inom – TKO 7
- Scott Cardle defeated Krzysztof Szot – PTS 6
- Andy Lee defeated Ferenc Hafner – TKO 2
- Luke Campbell defeated Chuck Jones – PTS 4

== Broadcasting ==
Country	Broadcaster
Australia	Main Event
Hungary	Sport 2
Mexico	Televisa
Poland	Canal+ Sport
United Kingdom	Sky Sports
United States	AWE

Previous: vs. Mikkel Kessler II	Carl Froch's bouts 23 November 2013	Next: Carl Froch vs. George Groves II
Previous: vs. Noé González Alcoba	George Groves's bouts 23 November 2013	Next: Carl Froch vs. George Groves II
