= Andre Ward vs. Arthur Abraham =

Boxing competition

- Date: May 14, 2011
- Venue: Home Depot Center, Carson, California, U.S.
- Title(s) on the line: WBA super middleweight championship

Tale of the tape
Boxer	(United States) Andre Ward	(Germany) Arthur Abraham
Nickname	"S.O.G."	"King Arthur"
Hometown	San Francisco, California, U.S.	Berlin, Berlin, Germany
Pre-fight record	23–0 (13 KO)	32–2 (26 KO)
Age	27 years, 2 months	31 years, 2 months
Height	6 ft 1 in (185 cm)	5 ft 10 in (178 cm)
Weight	168 lb (76 kg)	167 lb (76 kg)
Style	Orthodox	Orthodox
Recognition	WBA; Super Middleweight Champion; The Ring; No. 1 Ranked Super Middleweight	WBA; No. 3 Ranked Super Middleweight; The Ring; No. 8 Ranked Super Middleweight

Result
- Ward defeated Abraham via unanimous decision.

Andre Ward vs. Arthur Abraham was a Super Middleweight championship fight for the WBA Middleweight championship. The bout was held on May 14, 2011, at Home Depot Center, in Carson, California and was televised on Showtime. In the co-featured non-televised portion of the card, heavyweight world contender Cristobal Arreola took on Nagy Aguilera of the Dominican Republic.

== Background ==
In his first match of the tournament Abraham faced Jermain Taylor in October 2009 at Berlin, Germany defeating him via knockout in the 12th round. He then lost his next fight by disqualification due to hitting Andre Dirrell while he was down in the 11th round. He then lost to Carl Froch for the vacant WBC Super-Middleweight title in his third fight of the tournament, losing by a shutout unanimous decision.

Ward defeated Mikkel Kessler on November 21, 2009 for his WBA Super Middleweight Championship in his first of the Super Six World Boxing Classic. After, Jermain Taylor announced his exit from the Tournament. Allan Green was selected as his replacement and challenged the WBA Super Middleweight champion. Ward defeated Green by a shutout unanimous decision on June 19, 2010.

=== Referee and Judges ===
The referee for the fight was Luis Pabon, and the judges were Stanley Christodoulou, Ingo Barrabas, and James Jen-Kin. Luis Pabon had previously been referee for the Amir Khan vs. Paul McCloskey fight in April 2011.

== The fight ==
Ward started out slow with Abraham, trying to find a way to penetrate his tight defense. After a competitive first few rounds, Ward seized control of the fight, using his ring savvy and instincts to control Abraham. Although Abraham was somewhat passive at times, he gave an earnest effort and frequently threw combinations that were mostly blocked by Ward. Abraham hurt Ward a couple of times in the final round, but it wasn't enough to finish Ward, who won a lopsided unanimous decision.

== Main card ==
Confirmed bouts:

- Super Middleweight Championship bout: (United States) Andre Ward vs. (Armenia) Arthur Abraham

Ward defeated Abraham via unanimous decision (120–108, 118–110, 118–111).

- Heavyweight bout: (United States) Chris Arreola vs. (Dominican Republic) Nagy Aguilera

Arreola defeated Aguilera via technical knockout at 1:58 in the third round.

- Heavyweight bout: (United States) Manuel Quezada vs. (Australia) Bowie Tupou

Tupou defeated Quezada via knockout at 0:53 in the seventh round.

=== Preliminary card ===
- Middleweight bout: (Germany) Dominik Britsch vs. (United States) Ryan Davis

Britsch defeated Davis via technical knockout at 2:22 in the fifth round.

- Super Middleweight bout: (United States) Shawn Estrada vs. (United States) Byron Tyson

Estrada defeated Tyson via knockout in the first round.

- Light Middleweight bout: (United States) Javier Molina vs. (United States) Danny Figueroa

Molina defeated Figueroa via unanimous decision.

- Light Welterweight bout: (United States) Ty Barnett vs. (Russia) Andrey Klimov

Klimov defeated Tyson via technical knockout at 1:12 in the third round.

- Super Flyweight bout: (United States) Matthew Villanueva vs. (United States) Frank Gutierrez

Villanueva defeated Gutierrez via technical knockout at 1:12 in the first round.

- Light Middleweight bout: (Russia) Arman Ovsepyan vs. (Mexico) Arthur Brambila

Ovsepyan defeated Brambila via technical knockout at 2:44 in the first round.

== International broadcasting ==
Country	Broadcaster
Australia	Main Event
Denmark	TV2
Germany	Das Erste
Hungary	Sport 2
Poland	Polsat Sport
Portugal	Sport TV
Romania	Digi Sport
United States	Showtime

Preceded by vs. Sakio Bika	Andre Ward's bouts 14 May 2011	Succeeded by vs. Carl Froch
Preceded by vs. Stjepan Božić	Arthur Abraham's bouts 14 May 2011	Succeeded by vs. Pablo Farias
