= Carl Froch vs. Jermain Taylor =

Boxing competition

Continents Collide
- Date: 25 April 2009
- Venue: Foxwoods Resort Casino, Ledyard, Connecticut, U.S
- Title(s) on the line: WBC super middleweight championship

Tale of the tape
Boxer	(United Kingdom) Carl Froch	(United States) Jermain Taylor
Nickname	"The Cobra"	"Bad Intentions"
Hometown	Nottingham, East Midlands, UK	Little Rock, Arkansas, U.S.
Pre-fight record	24-0 (19 KO)	28-2-1 (17 KO)
Age	31 years, 9 months	30 years, 8 months
Height	6 ft 1 in (185 cm)	6 ft 1 in (185 cm)
Weight	167 lb (76 kg)	166 lb (75 kg)
Style	Orthodox	Orthodox
Recognition	WBC; Super Middleweight Champion; The Ring; No. 6 Ranked Super Middleweight	WBC; No. 1 Ranked Super Middleweight; The Ring; No. 5 Ranked Super Middleweight; Former Undisputed middleweight champion

Result
- Froch defeats Taylor by 12th round TKO

Carl Froch vs. Jermain Taylor, billed as Continents Collide, was a professional boxing match contested on 25 April 2009, for the WBC super middleweight championship. The fight was held at the Foxwoods Resort Casino in Ledyard, Connecticut, United States on 25 April 2009.

== Background ==
Froch was coming off a win against Jean Pascal for the vacant WBC title whilst Jermain Taylor had only recently stepped up to super-middleweight and was also coming off a win, beating Jeff Lacy in a title eliminator. Froch was ranked lower in the Ring Magazine rankings despite being the champion and was fighting in the United States for only the second time in his career.

During a press conference, reporters asked Taylor what he knew about Froch to which he replied: “Nothing.” He also claimed that whenever he told people who he was getting ready to fight they’d say “Carl who?”.

== The fight ==
Froch was knocked down late in the third round, the first time he had ever been down in his career.

A barrage of punches by Froch caused the referee to stop the fight with fourteen seconds remaining in Round 12, the final round, giving Froch the win by KO and retention of his WBC super middleweight title. At the time of the stoppage Taylor led 106–102 on two of the three judge's scorecards.

== Aftermath ==
Speaking after the bout Froch said "What I did in the 12th, that was unbelievable, I showed a little composure. I got up and knocked him out in round 12. What more do you want? Coming into the last round, I was hoping my intuition was right and Jermain was tiring from dealing with my pressure. I came out here to make a statement on American soil and I believe I made it."

== Undercard ==
Confirmed bouts:

== Broadcasting ==
Country	Broadcaster
Poland	Polsat
United Kingdom	ITV
United States	Showtime

== See also ==
Super Six World Boxing Classic

Preceded by vs. Jean Pascal	Carl Froch's bouts 25 April 2009	Succeeded by vs. Andre Dirrell
Preceded by vs. Jeff Lacy	Jermain Taylor's bouts 25 April 2009	Succeeded by vs. Arthur Abraham
