= Carl Froch vs. Jean Pascal =

Boxing competition

World Class
- Date: 6 December 2008
- Venue: Nottingham Arena, Nottingham, East Midlands, UK
- Title(s) on the line: vacant WBC super middleweight championship

Tale of the tape
Boxer	(United Kingdom) Carl Froch	(Canada) Jean Pascal
Nickname	"The Cobra"	
Hometown	Nottingham, East Midlands, UK	Montreal, Quebec, Canada
Pre-fight record	23–0 (19 KO)	21–0 (14 KO)
Age	31 years, 5 months	26 years, 1 month
Height	6 ft 1 in (185 cm)	5 ft 10 1/2 in (179 cm)
Weight	166 1/2 lb (76 kg)	168 lb (76 kg)
Style	Orthodox	Orthodox
Recognition	WBC; No. 1 Ranked Super-Middleweight; The Ring; No. 6 Ranked Super-Middleweight	WBC; No. 3 Ranked Super-Middleweight

Result
- Froch defeats Pascal by unanimous decision

Carl Froch vs. Jean Pascal, billed as World Class, was a professional boxing match contested on 6 December 2008, for the vacant WBC super middleweight championship.

== Background ==
In 2008, after Joe Calzaghe had moved up in weight to challenge Bernard Hopkins, his WBC super middleweight title became vacant. This meant that challengers Carl Froch and Jermain Taylor were in line to fight for the vacant title. However, Taylor opted to fight former IBF champion Jeff Lacy instead, which meant Jean Pascal would challenge Froch for the title on 8 December 2008. Both men went into the fight with an unbeaten record, but this would be their toughest test to date.

== The fight ==
A hard fought and intense encounter was entertaining from the off, with both men landing heavy blows and showing great toughness and determination. This continued throughout yet it was Froch who was able to take control in the second half of the fight and edge the closely fought rounds, and went on to win by unanimous decision with scores of 116–112, 117–111 and 118–110 to win his first world title.

== Aftermath ==
It was later revealed that Froch had suffered a perforated eardrum and cracked rib in his final sparring session ten days before the fight, but refused to pull out. Froch went on to hold multiple titles in the division, while Pascal moved up to light-heavyweight and also became champion. The two men became friends after the fight.

== Undercard ==
Confirmed bouts:

Scott Lawton defeated Martin Gethin - TKO 9

Danny McIntosh defeated Rod Anderton - TKO 1

Tyson Fury defeated Bela Gyongyosi - TKO 1

== Broadcasting ==
The fight was shown live on the free to air ITV in host nation United Kingdom.

Country	Broadcaster
United Kingdom	ITV
United States	ESPN2

Preceded by vs. Albert Rybacki	Carl Froch's bouts 6 December 2008	Succeeded by vs. Jermain Taylor
Preceded by vs. Omar Pittman	Jean Pascal's bouts 6 December 2008	Succeeded by vs. Pablo Daniel Zamora Nievas
