= George Groves (boxer) =

British boxer (born 1988)

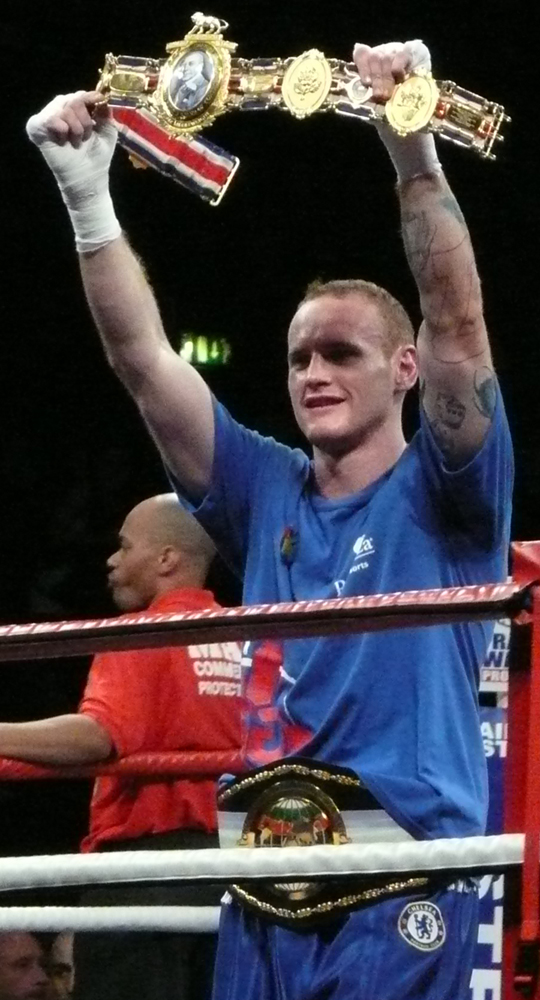
- Groves in 2011

Personal information
- Nickname: Saint George
- Born: 26 March 1988 (age 38) Hammersmith, West London, England
- Height: 5 ft 11 1/2 in (182 cm)
- Weight: Super-middleweight

Boxing career
- Reach: 74 in (188 cm)
- Stance: Orthodox

Boxing record
- Total fights: 32
- Wins: 28
- Win by KO: 20
- Losses: 4

George Groves (born 26 March 1988) is a British former professional boxer who competed from 2008 to 2018. He held the WBA (Super) super-middleweight title from 2017 to 2018. At regional level, he held multiple super-middleweight titles, including the European, British, and Commonwealth titles between 2010 and 2014. As an amateur, Groves won the ABA middleweight title twice in 2007 and 2008.

In March 2018, he was ranked as the world's best active super-middleweight by BoxRec, The Ring magazine and the Transnational Boxing Rankings Board.

== Amateur career ==
Groves generally fought in the 75 kilograms (165 lb) division as an amateur and won the Senior ABA championship for his weight in 2006 and 2007. He also fought in championships around the world and won medals in places such as Russia, Estonia, Bosnia, Morocco and the United States. In 2006, he defeated future Olympic and world champion James DeGale and compiled a total amateur record of 66 wins out of 76 fights with 40 stoppage victories.

== Professional career ==
=== Early career ===
Groves turned professional on 15 November 2008 and joined the Hayemaker Promotions stable. His first fight as a professional took place in November 2008 at The O2 Arena, on the undercard of David Haye's win over Monte Barrett with a six-round win over Kirill Pshonko. His next outing in February 2009, saw him score a third round stoppage over Romaric Hignard in a fight at the York Hall in Bethnal Green. He followed the victory up in March defeating Paul Samuels at the Echo Arena in Liverpool, and in April travelled to Belfast to dispose of Sandor Polgar.

In September 2009, following the collapse of Hayemaker's television deal with Setanta Sports, Groves along with Olympic bronze medalist David Price signed a promotional deal with veteran boxing promoter Frank Maloney who described Groves as "one of the world's best prospects". Despite signing for Maloney however, Groves would continue to be managed and trained by Hayemaker's Adam Booth. On 7 November 2009, following two more professional outings, Groves travelled to Germany and fought on the undercard of stablemate David Haye's WBA title win against Nikolai Valuev, defeating the experienced Konstantin Makhankov in his first fight over eight rounds.

=== British and Commonwealth champion ===
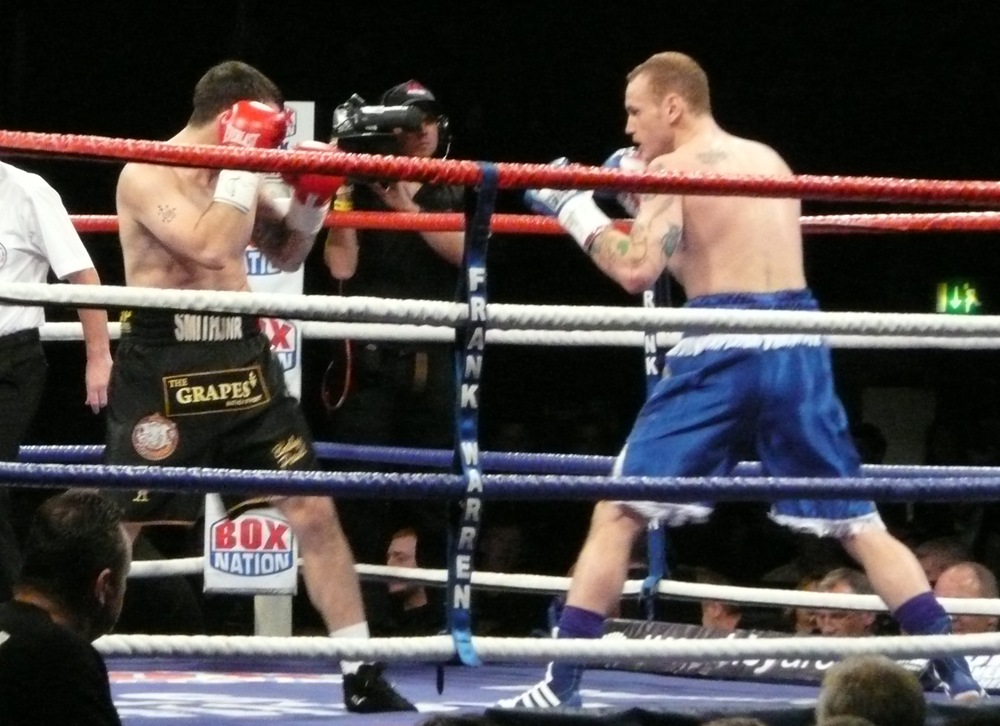
Groves (right) vs. Paul Smith, 2011

Groves' first title opportunity came on 3 April 2010, as part of the undercard of David Haye's first title defence against John Ruiz at the MEN Arena in Manchester. Groves, in only his ninth fight, defeated Charles Adamu via TKO to win the Commonwealth super-middleweight title. Groves had dominated the fight, knocking Adamu down once in the first and twice in the fourth before the referee stepped in with nine seconds remaining in the sixth. Groves followed up the win by travelling to Las Vegas in order to gain some higher-profile experience and to fight on the undercard of Marquez-Diaz II on 31 July 2010. Groves' opponent, Alfredo Contreras, had a record of eleven wins and seven losses going into the fight, but nonetheless represented a higher level of international journeyman than those Groves had already beaten. The fight was stopped in the sixth round after the referee decided that Contreras was not sufficiently answering back with punches.

On 13 November 2010, Groves made the first defence of his title beating former Commonwealth Games gold medalist Kenny Anderson in the sixth round. The fight, on the undercard of David Haye's world title clash with Audley Harrison at the MEN Arena, resulted in a career first knockdown for Groves as he endured his toughest fight to date. On 5 March 2011, Groves defeated Daniel Adotey Allotey at the Huddersfield Leisure Centre, winning by stoppage in the fourth round of what was an eight-round non-title fight. Following the bout Groves said that the fight had been preparation for a potential future clash with British champion and old foe James DeGale, a fight he predicted that he would win. He said "Whether it comes by knockout or points, I don't really care. He knows that I've got his number and he's going to struggle to sleep in the preparation for this fight because he is going to have me on his brain all the time."

==== Groves vs. DeGale ====
On 21 May 2011 at the O2 Arena in London, Groves and DeGale met in a highly anticipated grudge match for the Commonwealth and British super-middleweight titles. Groves was declared the winner by majority decision after twelve closely fought rounds. Two judges scored the fight 115–114 in favour of Groves, with another scoring the fight even at 115–115.

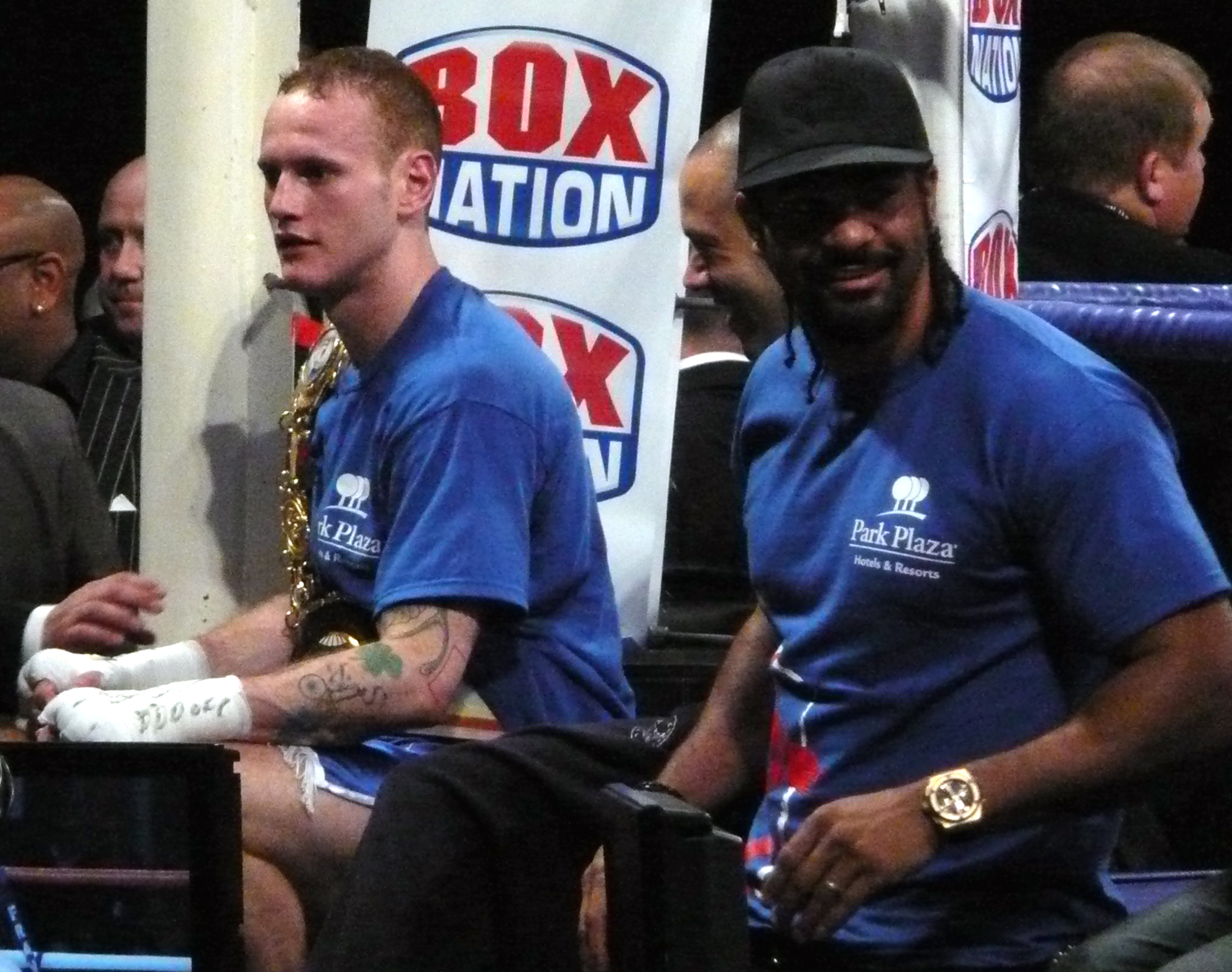
Groves with Adam Booth (centre) and David Haye, 2011

A rematch between DeGale and Groves became a possibility when Frank Warren, DeGale's promoter, announced that he had signed Groves to his stable on a three-year deal. Warren said, "It is an obvious fight that will definitely happen again", adding "The last fight was very close and a few observers felt that it could have gone either way". Despite leaving the Hayemaker promotional stable, Groves' manager and trainer Adam Booth announced that the decision to join Frank Warren was in the best interests of Groves' career.

==== Groves vs. Paul Smith, Johnson ====
In his first fight with Warren on 5 November 2011, Groves beat former British champion Paul Smith in two rounds at the Wembley Arena in London to retain his British and Commonwealth titles.

After nine months out, Groves returned to the ring in July 2012 knocking out Mexican boxer Francisco Sierra in 2 rounds. In December, Groves fought veteran former world champion Glen Johnson at the ExCel Arena. At the time of the fight, Johnson was 19 years older than Groves. Groves knocked Johnson down in the twelfth round, though Johnson appeared to fall more from being off balance. Groves won a lopsided decision after 12 rounds when the judges scored it (120–107, 120–107 & 119–109). Groves won 35 of 36 scored rounds on the three judges scorecards, gave Johnson a bad beating in the seventh round but the fight was not stopped though it could have been.

Groves fought twice in March 2013. He first knocked out Dario German Balmaceda in round 3 in London, before travelling to Germany two weeks later to stop Baker Barakat in two rounds.

In May, Groves defeated 34 year old Noe Gonzalez Alcoba (30–2, 22 KOs) at the O2 Arena on the undercard of the Carl Froch vs. Mikkel Kessler rematch. By doing so, he claimed the vacant WBA Inter-Continental super middleweight title. Groves landed a right hand in the opening minute of the fifth round which caught Noe Gonzalez coming forward and sent him down for a count of five. Gonzalez made it to his feet, but Gonzalez stood on shaky legs as the referee waved an end to the bout. Gonzalez's corner threw in the towel almost simultaneously with the referee's stoppage.

=== World title challenges ===
==== Groves vs. Froch ====
In mid-2013 the IBF installed Groves as the mandatory challenger to titleholder Carl Froch, with a bout between them taking place on 23 November 2013 at the Phones4u Arena in Manchester; both Froch's IBF and WBA super-middleweight titles were on the line. On 17 September, Groves parted ways with trainer Adam Booth. In the fight, Froch stopped Groves in the ninth round amidst controversial circumstances. Groves was ahead on all three judges' scorecards, having dropped the champion in the first round with a hard counter right hand. Many observers at ringside, including fellow boxers David Haye and Amir Khan, remarked that referee Howard Foster had stepped in too quickly during an exchange in which both fighters landed heavy punches. Given the controversial nature of the stoppage, there were immediate calls for a rematch.

On 24 January 2014, the IBF ordered a rematch between Froch and Groves, giving Froch 90 days to fight Groves or relinquish his IBF title.

==== Groves vs. Froch II ====
On 13 February 2014, it was announced by Eddie Hearn and Matchroom Boxing that Froch vs. Groves II would take place on 31 May 2014 at Wembley Stadium in London, England. Froch was quoted that the fight was what the 'British public want to see' and that was his reason for taking the option to give George Groves a rematch while defending his IBF and WBA super-middleweight titles. As soon as tickets went on sale, 60,000 tickets were sold in under an hour and a further 20,000 tickets were made available, making this the biggest ever attendance for a boxing match in Britain since the Second World War. As in the first fight, Froch's IBF and WBA super-middleweight titles were on the line. Prior to the fight, Groves signed with German promoters Sauerland, on what has been described as "a long-term deal".

The fight was a more cagey affair than the first match, with both fighters initially looking to outbox each other. Froch was stronger in the earlier rounds, with Jim Watt unofficially scoring the earlier rounds in favour of the champion on his Sky Sports scorecard. By the end of the seventh round, both Richie Woodhall and Steve Bunce had the fight scored 4 rounds to 3 for Froch on the BBC scorecards. Groves came out fighting in the 8th round before Froch got him pinned against the ropes and delivered a right hand blow which knocked Groves out. The referee, Charlie Fitch, instantly called the fight, sensing Groves was clearly in no fit state to continue. It was later named Knockout of the Year by The Ring for 2014.

Groves started rebuilding towards another world title match following Froch's retirement. On 20 September 2014, he won the European and vacant WBC silver super middleweight title after defeating French boxer Christopher Rebrassé via unanimous decision after 12 rounds. The scorecards were 118–110, 118–110, 117–111.

Two months later, Groves was back in the ring at the Echo Arena in Liverpool on the Tony Bellew vs. Nathan Cleverly PPV undercard. Groves knocked down American boxer Denis Douglin in round 7, winning the fight via TKO and also retaining the WBC Silver super middleweight title.

==== Groves vs. Jack ====
On 17 June 2015 it was announced that Badou Jack would make his first defence against mandatory challenger Groves on 22 August in Las Vegas. A venue had not been confirmed. This fight was Groves' third world title challenge, having lost back to back challenges against then world champion Carl Froch in 2013 and 2014 respectively. On 21 July, the fight was pushed back to instead take place on the undercard of Floyd Mayweather Jr. vs. Andre Berto on 12 September at the MGM Grand Garden Arena. There was no injuries as Showtime gave no reason as to why the fight was postponed. Jack was once again the underdog. It was Groves' third fight in the US, as well as his third chance at a world title. Going into the fight, old foe James DeGale had voiced his support for Groves, as he himself had become IBF champion four months prior, and was looking forward to a potential rematch with world titles at stake. In the opening round, Jack scored a knockdown against Groves, but the latter was able to recover and rally back in what would become a competitive fight. At the end, the scorecards were split with 115–112 and 116–111 for Jack, and 114–113 for Groves. Groves felt as though he did enough to win and said, "Losing a world title fight is the worst feeling in the world." In October 2016, Jack admitted that Groves was the toughest opponent he had faced in his career so far.

=== Return to the ring ===
Following his third failed attempt at claiming a world title, Groves had to start over. He hired Shane McGuigan as his new trainer. On 30 January 2016 Groves fought at the Copper Box in London against fringe Italian contender Andrea Di Luisa (18–3, 14 KOs). Di Luisa was down and given a count in the 4th round and down again twice in the 5th round before the towel is thrown in from his corner resulting in a TKO victory for Groves.

Groves returned to the O2 Arena for the first time since 2013, on the undercard of Martin-Joshua IBF title match on 9 April. Groves knocked out undefeated David Brophy in round 4. Groves won the vacant WBA international super-middleweight title. With this win, Groves hoped to land a fight with either Martin Murray or Callum Smith next.

==== Groves vs. Murray, Gutknecht ====
In May, it was announced that Groves would meet domestic rival and former four-time world title challenger Martin Murray in a WBA super middleweight title eliminator on 25 June at the O2 Arena on the Anthony Joshua vs. Dominic Breazeale undercard live on Sky Box Office. Both fighters were delighted that the fight was made. Murray made weight on second attempt. After a long battle, Groves defeated Murray via a 12-round unanimous decision. The three judges scored the fight at 118–110, giving Murray only two rounds. Groves hurt Murray with big right hands in rounds 7, 9 and 12. Murray had Groves looking hurt in the 10th after hitting him with a left hook to the head. Both fighters looked tired and ragged in the 12th round. Their conditioning looked less than to be desired at that point in the fight.

On 18 November 2016, Groves was set to defend his International title for a second time, this time against German boxer Eduard Gutknecht (30–4–1, 13 KOs). Gutknecht had previously challenged once for the world super middleweight title and once the world light heavyweight title. The fight took place at the Wembley Arena in London. In a one-sided fight, Groves defeated Gutknecht by 12 round unanimous decision title. The judges scored it (119–110, 119–109 and 119–109) all in favour of Groves. Groves showed good boxing skills in surviving an early attack from Gutknecht in the first three rounds. Groves had to take some hard power shots and jabs. In round 9, Gutknecht took a lot of heavy blows from Groves. At the end of the round, Gutknecht's right eye was badly swollen and almost completely shut. Gutknecht was able to catch Groves with some hard jabs that got his attention in the 9th. Gutknecht was no longer throwing power shots, which at this point was what he needed to win the rounds. Gutknecht collapsed in the dressing room following the bout and was taken to hospital where he underwent surgery for swelling to the brain. The fight, which was televised on Channel 5 on Friday night, averaged 780,000 viewers.

=== WBA (Super) super-middleweight champion ===
==== Groves vs. Chudinov ====
On 7 December 2016, Groves confirmed via his Twitter account that he would challenge Fedor Chudinov for the vacant WBA super middleweight title. This would be his 4th attempt at a world title. Although the venue wasn't confirmed via his Twitter, Groves stated he would like to fight in London. Sauerland Events confirmed they had until 5 January 2017 to agree on a deal. On 8 April, Kalle Sauerland tweeted that an agreement was signed for the fight to take place in the UK. On 20 April, it was announced that the fight would take place at Bramall Lane in Sheffield on 27 May as part of the undercard of Brook-Spence PPV. A day later, the WBA announced an immediate rematch between their 'Regular' title holder Tyron Zeage and Isaac Epko after their initial fight ended in a technical decision win for Zeage in the early rounds. The winner of both fights would then need to meet in order to decide one titleholder, as part of WBA's plans to reduce the number of world titles per division.

In his fourth attempt, Groves finally became world champion when he stopped Chudinov in round six. A barrage of punches gave referee Steve Gray no choice but to halt the fight giving Groves the win. The fight was non stop action from the opening bell. After an evenly matched first two rounds, Groves took control. Groves was cut above the eye in round four after an accidental clash of heads. The official time of stoppage was 1 minute and 14 seconds. Groves spoke to Sky Sports after the fight and credited his trainer Shane McGuigan, "This is the end of a lifetime's work. Shane McGuigan has resurrected my career. Now I'm mature enough to admit that. I feel like I'm the best in the division. I'm willing and ready to fight anyone." On 1 June, Groves had surgery after it was revealed that he broke his jaw in round 3 in the win against Chudinov. Groves said, That or [I] broke it from over-smiling since."

=== World Boxing Super Series ===
On 16 June 2017, Groves announced that he would be the first super-middleweight to join the World Boxing Super Series tournament. The 8-man bracket-style elimination tournament, which would see the winner earn a grand cash prize as well as the 'greatest prize in boxing', the Muhammad Ali Trophy. The reason for joining was to prove that he is the best super-middleweight in the world. A draft gala was scheduled to take place on 8 July in Monaco to determine who Groves would fight in the quarter-finals. Groves hinted that he could possibly retire from boxing if he was to win the tournament. Groves said, “If I win this tournament I could walk away from boxing satisfied as a unified world champion.” He also said that if the next WBSS tournament took place at light heavyweight, he would be willing to move up and participate.

==== Groves vs. Cox ====
At the Draft Gala on 8 July, Groves, who was first-seeded, meaning he had the option to select his opponent, choose to fight undefeated British boxer Jamie Cox (23–0, 13 KOs). Groves explained, picking Cox was a '"strategic" move and due to the tournament being long, it would be best to "pick the easy guy first". Cox was ranked #9 by the WBA at the time. AG Comosa announced the fight would take place on 14 October 2017 at The SSE Arena in Wembley, London. Groves' WBA title would also be at stake as well the winner advancing to the semi-finals against the winner of Chris Eubank Jr. and Avni Yildrim. Groves took back his earlier words of saying Cox was the easiest, "I know there are no easy fights in this tournament and there are no easy fights at world level, but Jamie is the guy I know the most about." Groves retained his title and advanced to the semi-finals of the tournament in a competitive bout which came to an end in round 4. A perfectly placed right hand to the body send Cox down in pain. Referee Steve Gray counted him out at 1 minute, 42 seconds into the round. The fight started with both boxers feeling each other out and trading sporadically. Cox boxed well for the first two rounds however seemed a little reckless in doing so. Groves boxed sensibly, waiting for counter shots. Chris Eubank Jr., who was sat ringside, entered the ring, giving his thoughts on the fight, "It was a good fight, he did what he had to win, not too many cuts and bruises so it looks like we're on for January. That's what we wanted." Groves spoke about his fallen opponent, "I picked him because I believe he was the most dangerous of the unseeded fighters. I didn't want an easy fight." Groves landed 48 of 163 punches thrown (29%), 42 of them being power shots. Cox landed 36 of 131 thrown (28%).

==== Groves vs. Eubank Jr. ====
Due to winning their respective bouts in October 2017, Groves and Chris Eubank Jr. (26–1, 20 KOs) were due to meet in the semi-final of the tournament. At first, promoter Kalle Sauerland stated he would try to book the fight for a stadium in either London or Manchester. In November 2017, ITV reported the fight was set to take place on 17 February 2018 at the Manchester Arena in Manchester, Europe's largest purpose-built indoor arena. The winner of the fight would earn his place in the final of the tournament as well as walk out with the WBA (Super) and IBO super-middleweight titles. Tickets for the fight sold out in seven minutes. Groves weighed 167 pounds, a full pound under the weight limit and Eubank came in at 167.5 pounds. Eubank Jr was ranked #2 both by the WBC and WBA at the time.

Groves secured his place in the final of the tournament after defeating Eubank over 12 rounds. The judges scored the fight 117–112, 116–112 and 115–113 for Groves. Groves, the bigger man in the ring, used his jab to control the fight after a cagey round and mostly fought on the back foot, occasionally landing the big shot. An accidental clash of heads caused Eubank to receive a cut on the side of his right eye in round 3. The big cut was dealt with by his corner after the round, but as the fight went on to the later rounds, blood was seen flowing expeditiously. Many thought Eubanks cutman was inadequate in his attempt to stop the cut, Eubank later said he struggled to see out the eye. The fight was riddled with a lot of clinches and unclean punches from both boxers. Groves retained his WBA title but did not claim Eubank's IBO title as he did not pay their sanctioning fees. Groves also suffered a dislocated shoulder in round 12. It was said that Groves weighed around 184 pounds on fight night. After the fight, Groves said, “It was about who wanted it most, I think, and I obviously wanted it most. The jab was landing correctly all night. When he had success, it was because I did something wrong. He was strong, he was aggressive, but that obviously wasn’t enough tonight.” Eubank replied, “I thought it was close. I thought I did enough in the later rounds to win the fight, but it was a close fight. And all credit to George. You know, this is all part of boxing. You win some and you lose some. Hopefully we can get a rematch. It was enough of a good fight to have another one.” Punch stats showed that Groves landed 117 of 398 punches thrown (29%) and Eubank landed 92 of his 421 thrown (22%). Many pundits and former boxers stated Eubank should move forward and hire a trainer. Both boxers earned a base purse of £1.5 million, which could increase due to sponsorship and PPV sales. Four days after the fight it was revealed Groves didn't fight for the IBO belt after failing to agree on sanctioning fees with the IBO's president Ed Levine.

==== Groves vs. Callum Smith ====
On 13 February, it was announced that the final of the super-middleweight tournament would take place at the O2 Arena in London on 2 June 2018. The final was made up after Groves defeated Eubank Jr. on 17 February and Callum Smith (24–0, 17 KOs) defeating Nieky Holzken on 24 February. On 26 February, Groves tweeted that he would be going into surgery. He wrote, "We will be applying to the @WBSuperSeries for a one-month extension and are hopeful of securing this." He hoped to return to the ring by July.

On 9 May, Kalle Sauerland said that Groves could potentially be replaced by Chris Eubank Jr. in the final of the tournament against Smith, however there would be confirmation on the final in the next 10 days. Sauerland stated, "We're working at the moment on all the solutions and scenarios, where George [Groves] is fit and where he isn't. We're hopeful [Groves will be fit], so we'll see. You can't start the tournament and then have the final lingering into the next tournament. I'm sorry, that's not going to happen. We can push a month, but we can’t push it back by three or four months. We have a substitute system. We said that from day one, and that’s the situation. We want Groves in the final, but if that’s not possible and he doesn't declare himself fit in the next 10 days, we have to find a solution." On 28 May, it was said that Groves would be declared fit with the fight to take place on 14 July. By 6 July, there was still no date set, however according to Kalle Sauerland, the bout was expected to take place in September and likely not in the UK, with some rumours hinting there was a strong interest from Las Vegas and Middle East. Smith's trainer Joe Gallagher confirmed contracts had been signed. On 27 July, Sauerland announced the fight would take place at a 10,000 capacity arena at the King Abdullah Sports City Complex in Jeddah, Saudi Arabia on 28 September 2018. It was reported the prize money on offer for the final was £6.1 million, with the winner taking a larger percentage. Smith was ranked #1 by the WBC and #4 by the WBA at super middleweight.

After a tight match with the fighters level on the judges' scorecards, Smith defeated Groves by round 7 knockout. The size difference was noticeable as the fight was fought closely throughout the opening 6 rounds with back and forth action. Early in the fight, Groves established his jab whilst trying to avoid any power shots from Smith, whilst Smith was connecting with his right hand. Smith had more success in round 3 after a counter-right hand buckled Groves legs. In round 6, Smith backed Groves against the ropes and landed two strong jabs. He later landed a clean left hook which forced Groves to move back. Midway through round 7, Groves landed two body shots, however leaving himself open, Smith landed a left hook, which again shook Groves and forced him to retreat backwards. Groves was hurt at this point and Smith went after Groves against the ropes and landed numerous shots, including a hard body shot and an uppercut, ultimately sending Groves to the canvas. Groves managed to get to one knee, before referee Luis Pabon finished the 10-count, giving Smith the win. Groves made no excuses, claiming the shoulder was never an issue in the fight. He also ruled out retirement. Muhammad Ali's daughter presented Smith with the trophy. Smith claimed the WBA super-middleweight title along with the vacant Ring Magazine title. Smith became the third super-middleweight after Joe Calzaghe and Andre Ward to win the Ring belt. There were four official judge's scorecards. One judge had it even after 6 rounds at 57–57, two judges had Groves ahead 59–55 and 58–56 and one judge had Smith ahead 59–55.

=== Retirement ===
On 28 January 2019, at the age of 30, Groves announced his retirement from professional boxing, stating, "I don't want there to be a time where I'm 'too old' to box, or where injury retires me." In a long statement, he highlighted some career events and offered a prayer for Eduard Gutknecht. Groves ended his career on 28 wins, with 20 coming inside the distance and 4 losses.

== Professional boxing record ==
32 fights	28 wins	4 losses
By knockout	20	3
By decision	8	1

No.	Result	Record	Opponent	Type	Round, time	Date	Location	Notes
32	Loss	28–4	Callum Smith	KO	7 (12), 2:04	28 Sep 2018	King Abdullah Sports City, Jeddah, Saudi Arabia	Lost WBA (Super) super-middleweight title; For vacant The Ring super-middleweight title; World Boxing Super Series: super-middleweight final
31	Win	28–3	Chris Eubank Jr.	UD	12	17 Feb 2018	Manchester Arena, Manchester, England	Retained WBA (Super) super-middleweight title; World Boxing Super Series: super-middleweight semi-final
30	Win	27–3	Jamie Cox	KO	4 (12), 1:42	14 Oct 2017	The SSE Arena Wembley, London, England	Retained WBA (Super) super-middleweight title; World Boxing Super Series: super-middleweight quarter-final
29	Win	26–3	Fedor Chudinov	TKO	6 (12), 1:14	27 May 2017	Bramall Lane, Sheffield, England	Won vacant WBA (Super) super-middleweight title
28	Win	25–3	Eduard Gutknecht	UD	12	18 Nov 2016	The SSE Arena Wembley, London, England	Retained WBA International super-middleweight title
27	Win	24–3	Martin Murray	UD	12	25 Jun 2016	The O2 Arena, London, England	Retained WBA International super-middleweight title
26	Win	23–3	David Brophy	KO	4 (12), 0:47	9 Apr 2016	The O2 Arena, London, England	Won vacant WBA International super-middleweight title
25	Win	22–3	Andrea Di Luisa	TKO	5 (12), 1:55	30 Jan 2016	Copper Box Arena, London, England	
24	Loss	21–3	Badou Jack	SD	12	12 Sep 2015	MGM Grand Garden Arena, Paradise, Nevada, US	For WBC super-middleweight title
23	Win	21–2	Denis Douglin	TKO	7 (12), 2:54	22 Nov 2014	Echo Arena, Liverpool, England	Retained WBC Silver super-middleweight title
22	Win	20–2	Christopher Rebrassé	UD	12	20 Sep 2014	The SSE Arena Wembley, London, England	Won European and vacant WBC Silver super-middleweight titles
21	Loss	19–2	Carl Froch	KO	8 (12), 2:34	31 May 2014	Wembley Stadium, London, England	For WBA (Unified) and IBF super-middleweight titles
20	Loss	19–1	Carl Froch	TKO	9 (12), 1:33	23 Nov 2013	Phones4u Arena, Manchester, England	For WBA (Unified) and IBF super-middleweight titles
19	Win	19–0	Noé González Alcoba	TKO	5 (12), 0:51	25 May 2013	The O2 Arena, London, England	Won vacant WBA Inter-Continental super-middleweight title
18	Win	18–0	Baker Barakat	TKO	2 (8), 2:20	23 Mar 2013	GETEC Arena, Magdeburg, Germany	
17	Win	17–0	Dario German Balmaceda	TKO	3 (10), 0:58	9 Mar 2013	Wembley Arena, London, England	
16	Win	16–0	Glen Johnson	UD	12	15 Dec 2012	ExCeL, London, England	Retained Commonwealth super-middleweight title
15	Win	15–0	Francisco Sierra	TKO	6 (10), 2:15	28 Jul 2012	HP Pavilion, San Jose, California, US	
14	Win	14–0	Paul Smith	TKO	2 (12), 1:18	5 Nov 2011	Wembley Arena, London, England	Retained British and Commonwealth super-middleweight titles
13	Win	13–0	James DeGale	MD	12	21 May 2011	The O2 Arena, London, England	Retained Commonwealth super-middleweight title; Won British super-middleweight title
12	Win	12–0	Daniel Adotey Allotey	TKO	4 (8), 1:53	5 Mar 2011	Leisure Centre, Huddersfield, England	
11	Win	11–0	Kenny Anderson	TKO	6 (12), 2:35	13 Nov 2010	MEN Arena, Manchester, England	Retained Commonwealth super-middleweight title
10	Win	10–0	Alfredo Contreras	TKO	6 (8), 0:48	31 Jul 2010	Mandalay Bay Events Center, Paradise, Nevada, US	
9	Win	9–0	Charles Adamu	TKO	6 (12), 2:51	3 Apr 2010	MEN Arena, Manchester, England	Won Commonwealth super-middleweight title
8	Win	8–0	Grigor Sarohanian	TKO	3 (6)	22 Jan 2010	Brentwood Centre, Brentwood, England	
7	Win	7–0	Konstantin Makhankov	UD	8	7 Nov 2009	Nuremberg Arena, Nuremberg, Germany	
6	Win	6–0	Tadas Jonkus	TKO	4 (6), 1:49	16 Oct 2009	Seaburn Centre, Sunderland, England	
5	Win	5–0	Martins Kukulis	TKO	5 (8), 2:50	4 Oct 2009	York Hall, London, England	
4	Win	4–0	Sandor Polgar	TKO	1 (6), 1:54	25 Apr 2009	Ulster Hall, Belfast, Northern Ireland	
3	Win	3–0	Paul Samuels	TKO	1 (6), 2:31	28 Mar 2009	Echo Arena, Liverpool, England	
2	Win	2–0	Romaric Hignard	TKO	3 (6), 1:48	1 Feb 2009	York Hall, London, England	
1	Win	1–0	Kirilas Psonko	PTS	6	15 Nov 2008	The O2 Arena, London, England	

== Pay-per-view bouts ==
United Kingdom
No.	Date	Fight	Network	Buys	Source(s)
1	21 May 2011	George Groves vs. James DeGale	Sky Box Office	43,000	
2	23 November 2013	Carl Froch vs. George Groves	Sky Box Office	47,000	
3	31 May 2014	Carl Froch vs. George Groves II	Sky Box Office	355,000	
4	14 October 2017	George Groves vs. Jamie Cox	ITV Box Office		
5	17 February 2018	George Groves vs. Chris Eubank Jr.	ITV Box Office		
6	28 September 2018	George Groves vs. Callum Smith	ITV Box Office		
Total sales				445,000	

Sporting positions
Amateur boxing titles
Previous: James DeGale	ABA middleweight champion 2007, 2008	Next: Hosea Burton
Regional boxing titles
Preceded by Charles Adamu	Commonwealth super-middleweight champion 3 April 2010 – September 2013; Vacated	Vacant Title next held by Rocky Fielding
Preceded by James DeGale	British super-middleweight champion 21 May 2011 – October 2012; Vacated	Vacant Title next held by Kenny Anderson
Vacant Title last held by Stjepan Božić	WBA Inter-Continental super-middleweight champion 25 May 2013 – 23 November 2013; Lost bid for world title	Vacant Title next held by Rocky Fielding
Preceded by Christopher Rebrassé	European super-middleweight champion 20 September 2014 – November 2014; Vacated	Vacant Title next held by Hadillah Mohoumadi
Vacant Title last held by James DeGale	WBC Silver super-middleweight champion 20 September 2014 – 12 September 2015; Lost bid for world title	Vacant Title next held by Callum Smith
Vacant Title last held by Frank Buglioni	WBA International super-middleweight champion 9 April 2016 – 27 May 2017; Won world title	Vacant Title next held by Viktor Polyakov
Major world boxing titles
Vacant Title last held by Felix Sturm	WBA super-middleweight champion Super title 27 May 2017 – 28 September 2018	Succeeded by Callum Smith
