= Charles Adamu =

Ghanaian boxer (born 1977)

Personal information
- Nationality: Ghanaian
- Born: 8 May 1977 (age 49) Accra, Ghana
- Weight: Super-middleweight; Light-heavyweight

Boxing career
- Stance: Orthodox

Boxing record
- Total fights: 48
- Wins: 33
- Win by KO: 26
- Losses: 15

Charles Adamu (born 8 May 1977) is a Ghanaian professional boxer. As an amateur he represented Ghana in the 1998 Kuala Lumpur Commonwealth Games, where he won a bronze medal, and in the 2000 Sydney Olympic Games, where he reached the second round. As a professional he is a two-time holder of the Commonwealth super middleweight title.

== Professional career ==
Adamu's professional debut came in August 2001 with a victory over Bob Abiro in Kaneshie, Ghana. He fought seven more times, winning on each occasion, before travelling to the United Kingdom on 1 August 2003, where he defeated England's Matthew Barney for the Commonwealth super middleweight title. Following the title win Adamu returned to Ghana and scored two more victories before returning to Europe, this time to Germany, to fight Ukrainian Vitali Tsypko for the WBA Inter-continental title on 28 February 2004. The fight with Tsypko lasted the distance but resulted in the first defeat for the Ghanaian.

=== Commonwealth champion ===
Adamu's next fight following the defeat was on 12 March 2004 in the United Kingdom and was the first defence of his Commonwealth title. His opponent, Britain's Carl Froch, who would go on to become the WBC World Super Middleweight champion, inflicted Adamu's second defeat in a row. Froch would go on to describe the Ghanaian as his toughest opponent to date in a 2007 interview.

The next fight of note for the now former Commonwealth champion took place on 18 June 2005 and meant that Adamu had to travel once more, this time to Canada. His opponent in a challenge for the WBC inter continental title was Jamaican Otis Grant and the fight resulted in a third career defeat, again on points for Adamu. In the next three years, Adamu only boxed on three more occasions, gaining three more wins before travelling once more, this time to South Africa to fight for the African Boxing Union's super middleweight belt. The fight on 13 September 2008 against Malawi's Isaac Chilemba resulted in a fourth defeat for Adamu as he went down to a 12-round points defeat in a title contest.

=== Two-time title holder ===
On 18 December 2009 Adamu returned to the United Kingdom to challenge once more for the Commonwealth title. In a fight that once more went the full 12 rounds, Adamu won a split decision over England's Carl Dilks to regain the title he first held in 2003. However, Adamu would go on to lose the title in his first defence, this time to prospect George Groves. The fight, on 3 April 2010, was ended in the sixth round after Groves had put Adamu down three times during the fight.

Preceded by Jermain Mackey vacated	Commonwealth Super Middleweight Champion; December 18, 2009 - April 3, 2010	Succeeded by George Groves
Preceded by Andre Thysse vacated	Commonwealth Super Middleweight Champion; August 1, 2003 - March 12, 2004	Succeeded by Carl Froch
