= Carl Froch vs. George Groves II =

Boxing competition

Unfinished Business
- Date: 31 May 2014
- Venue: Wembley Stadium, London, England
- Title(s) on the line: IBF and WBA (Regular) super-middleweight titles

Tale of the tape
Boxer	Carl Froch	George Groves
Nickname	"The Cobra"	"Saint"
Hometown	Nottingham, England	London, England
Pre-fight record	32–2 (23 KO)	19–1 (15 KO)
Age	36 years, 10 months	26 years, 2 months
Height	6 ft 1 in (185 cm)	5 ft 11 1/2 in (182 cm)
Weight	167 1/2 lb (76 kg)	166 1/4 lb (75 kg)
Style	Orthodox	Orthodox
Recognition	IBF and WBA (Regular) super middleweight champion The Ring; No. 1 ranked super-middleweight The Ring No. 10 ranked pound for pound	WBA; No. 2 ranked super-middleweight The Ring; No. 5 ranked super-middleweight IBF; No. 7 ranked super-middleweight

Result
- Froch wins by knockout in round 8

Carl Froch vs. George Groves II, billed as Unfinished Business and The Rematch, was a professional boxing match contested on 31 May 2014 at Wembley Stadium in London. It was a rematch of the first fight between Carl Froch and George Groves in 2013, with Froch's unified World Boxing Association (WBA) (Regular version) and International Boxing Federation (IBF) super-middleweight titles at stake as before.

Froch won the fight by knockout in the eighth round, which was named the Knockout of the Year by The Ring magazine. The event drew a then-record attendance figure of 80,000 and grossed over £22 million, and was named the Event of the Year by The Ring. This would be Froch's final professional fight before announcing his retirement a year later.

== Background ==
Carl Froch and George Groves first fought on 23 November 2013 at the Manchester Arena (then known as the Phones4u Arena). In that fight, Froch's two world titles were also at stake. Groves scored a surprise knockdown in the opening round and went on to build up a lead on all three judges' scorecards. In round nine, the fight ended in highly controversial circumstances when Froch managed land a series of punches to hurt Groves, which prompted referee Howard Foster to stop the fight on a technical knockout. The result was heavily protested by Groves and his team, as well as by fans and the media, creating immediate demand for a rematch.

=== Build-up ===
The rematch was officially announced on 4 March 2014 by Matchroom Boxing promoter Eddie Hearn, for whom Froch had fought since 2011 and Groves since 2013. It was the first boxing event to be held at the new Wembley Stadium since it opened in 2007; the last to be held at the old Wembley Stadium was Oliver McCall vs. Frank Bruno on 2 September 1995. A new attendance record for a British boxing event was also anticipated, which would break the previous record of 57,000 at the City of Manchester Stadium, during Ricky Hatton vs. Juan Lazcano on 24 May 2008. Froch's WBA (Regular) and IBF super-middleweight titles would again be on the line.

As with their first fight, Froch and Groves appeared on Sky Sports' boxing magazine show Ringside. In their first meeting on the show, on 8 November 2013, Groves insisted on referring to Froch by his second name only, while Froch refused to even look at him. Their second meeting, on 2 May 2014, was slightly more cordial and ended with a handshake. However, when they shook hands again on Sky's round table sit-down show, The Gloves Are Off, Groves attempted to pull Froch over the table but was himself pulled over instead. Both fights were likened to the rivalry between Nigel Benn and Chris Eubank in the early 1990s. In the build-up to the rematch there was much animosity between both boxers, with copious amounts of trash-talk and each vowing to score a knockout.

The weigh-in took place on 30 May at the nearby Wembley Arena, in front of 4,000 raucous fans who were predominantly in support of native Londoner Groves. Froch came in at 167 1/2 pounds (76.0 kg), a shade under the super-middleweight limit of 168 lb (76 kg). Groves came in at 166 1/4 lb (75.4 kg), considerably under the limit. Froch taunted Groves during the staredown, to which Groves said afterwards: "Carl was talking and talking, [he] said I looked dry, I looked tight at the weight. He is grasping for something, he needs reassurance. I said this six months ago. He can't find it and for that reason he is going to struggle. He is gone."

== Fight details ==
As part of the entrance spectacle, Groves first entered the arena on an open top bus, accompanied by the song "Underdog" by Kasabian. Froch, who entered to a medley of "We Will Rock You" by Queen and "Shoot to Thrill" by AC/DC, chose a more conventional walk through the stands. Unlike in their first fight, the crowd was overwhelmingly in support of Groves. In the early rounds of the fight itself, which was described as "often cagey" and one which "burned slowly", Groves started well by landing his jab consistently and catching Froch with a combination at the end of round two. Froch started to utilise his own jab in round three, as both boxers exchanged heavy shots. In the fourth, Groves returned to his jab, but Froch responded at the end of the round by catching Groves on the ropes with body punches.

Round five was action-packed, as several exchanges of clean punches from both boxers elicited a standing ovation from the crowd. In the sixth, Froch pressed forward while landing more punches, but Groves responded with his own at the end of the round. He followed this up in round seven by landing a left hook that made Froch stumble, as well as a hurtful right hook soon afterwards. By this stage, Froch led by 67–66 on two of the judges' scorecards, with the third judge scoring it 68–65 for Groves. Froch began to rally back in the eighth by pursuing Groves against the ropes, which culminated in the finishing moment of the fight: a left hook from Froch, blocked by Groves' glove, was followed by a devastating right cross flush on the chin, sending Groves to the canvas in a crumpled heap. Without any controversy this time, referee Charlie Fitch immediately waved off the fight as a knockout at 2 minutes and 43 seconds, as Groves attempted to stand up on shaky legs.

=== CompuBox statistics ===
According to CompuBox, Froch threw 349 punches and landed 96 for an accuracy of 28%; Groves threw 314 punches and landed 126 for an accuracy of 40%. Groves had the edge in jabs, with 218 thrown and 83 landed (38% accuracy); Froch threw 212 and landed 40 (19% accuracy). Conversely, Froch threw 137 power punches and landed 56 (41% accuracy); Groves threw 96 and landed 43 (45% accuracy).

== Aftermath ==
Immediately after the fight, Froch said "I am feeling unbelievably elated, this is the best moment in the history of my boxing career. ... I knew it was only going to take a couple of big right hands to the chin and I timed it perfectly." In the following days, he went on to express satisfaction in having soundly beaten his rival: "I've had to endure some serious abuse, silly games and unnecessary antagonising. He's been antagonising me for so long. ... Some of the stuff his trainer was saying and Groves was saying, it was just horrible. ... He's now been sent back to the hole he crawled out of, as far as I'm concerned."

Groves lamented that "Carl should be gracious with his win. He certainly doesn't need to beat up on me some more. I totally dominated the first fight and I felt like I was in control of the second fight. ... It's just one of those punches. It's a shame it happened now—I've spent my whole career where this could've happened and hasn't, and it's happened to me at the worst possible time. It certainly won't be the end of my career."

On 14 September, Groves returned to the ring and scored a unanimous decision against Christopher Rebrassé, winning the European and WBC Silver super-middleweight titles. In July 2015, more than a year afterwards and having not fought during that time, Froch retired from boxing. After announcing his retirement, he spoke more fondly of the event and rivalry with Groves: "We all did ourselves proud and you couldn't have written the script for what happened. The script couldn't have been better. It's just amazing these things happen. ... To transcend the sport over to a whole new audience for me, on that platform and the way to finish it, in such a conclusive manner, was so satisfying. That is my defining moment."

Groves also reflected on the rivalry that day: "We don't need to be friends—I've got friends. ... There's a rivalry when you're going to box and now that he's no longer a fighter that rivalry isn't there. ... He's a tough man to beat. Sometimes you think you've got him and a bit of controversy gets in the way and sometimes you're boxing really well, you're in full control, and then one punch and it can change a fight."

The attendance figure of 80,000 stood as a British post-War record until being surpassed by Anthony Joshua vs. Wladimir Klitschko in 2017, which drew 90,000. Notably, Joshua fought on the undercard of Froch–Groves II and would go on to headline against Klitschko.

== Undercard ==
Confirmed bouts:

- James DeGale defeated Brandon Gonzáles – TKO 4
- Kevin Mitchell defeated Ghislain Maduma – TKO 11
- Jamie McDonnell defeated Tabtimdaeng Na Rachawat – TKO 10
- Anthony Joshua defeated Matt Legg – KO 1
- Martin Joseph Ward drew with Ian Bailey – TD 1
- Gamal Yafai defeated Jack Heath – TKO 1

== Broadcasting ==
The fight was broadcast in 60 countries worldwide. In the UK, the primary carrier was Sky Box Office. In the US, viewing figures on HBO averaged 700,000 with a peak of 830,000.

Country	Broadcaster
Australia	Main Event
Denmark	TV3 Sport
Hungary	Sport 2
Norway	Viasat Sport
Sweden	TV 10
United Kingdom	Sky Sports
United States	HBO

== See also ==
- Carl Froch vs. George Groves

Previous: Carl Froch vs. George Groves	Carl Froch's bouts 31 May 2014	Retired
Previous: Carl Froch vs. George Groves	George Groves's bouts 31 May 2014	Next: vs. Christopher Rebrassé
Awards
Previous: Floyd Mayweather Jr. vs. Canelo Álvarez	The Ring Event of the Year; 2014	Next: Floyd Mayweather Jr. vs. Manny Pacquiao
Previous: Chad Dawson vs. Adonis Stevenson	The Ring Knockout of the Year; 2014	Next: Canelo Álvarez vs. James Kirkland
