= Damon Hague =

British boxer

Personal information
- Nationality: British
- Born: 29 October 1970 (age 55) Derby, Derbyshire, UK
- Height: 1.83 m (6 ft 0 in)
- Weight: Middleweight

Boxing career
- Stance: Orthodox

Boxing record
- Total fights: 28
- Wins: 23
- Win by KO: 12
- Losses: 4
- Draws: 1

Damon Hague (born 29 October 1970) is a former two weight World Boxing Foundation champion.

Hague was the first boxer ever to win a World Boxing Foundation World title from Derby. In late 2003, Hague was due to defend his WBF title against Robin Reid, but Reid decided to take on Sven Ottke in Germany.

Hague was also undefeated British kick boxing Champion and Midlands Area Boxing champion. Hague's last professional fight on 24 September 2004 was for the British and Commonwealth Super Middleweight titles against Carl Froch.

== Fight record ==
- 28 Fights
  - Wins 23
  - Loses 4
  - Draws 1
- World Boxing Foundation Super Middleweight Champion
- World Boxing Foundation Middleweight Champion
- World Boxing Foundation Pan-European Champion
- British and Commonwealth title challenger
- Midlands Area Champion
