= Matthew Barney (boxer) =

English boxer (born 1974)

Personal information
- Nationality: British
- Born: 25 June 1974 (age 52)
- Height: 6’1 ft
- Weight: Super middleweight; Light heavyweight

Boxing career
- Stance: Orthodox

Boxing record
- Total fights: 37
- Wins: 26
- Win by KO: 6
- Losses: 10
- Draws: 1

Matthew Barney (born 25 June 1974) is a British former professional boxer who competed from 1998 to 2012. He held the British super middleweight title in 2003.

In 2002, Barney held the Southern Area super middleweight title.; that same year, Barney defeated Paul Owen for the British Masters super middleweight title. Then in 2003, Barney defeated Dean Francis for the British super middleweight title. In 2005 Barney challenged Thomas Ulrich for the European light heavyweight title, and in most viewers opinions had won every round that evening, to then hear the score cards of 115 to 114 on all cards for Ulrich. Barney also fought Carl Froch in July 2005 for the British and Commonwealth super middleweight title but lost on a points decision. He fought Portsmouth's Paul Morby for the vacant title on 25 September 2010 at the Fleming Park Leisure Centre in Eastleigh. Barney's manager, London promoter Michael Helliet, said, "I'm sure he can still win major titles and this fight is a step towards that." Barney has also held the IBO Intercontinental and WBU versions of the super middleweight title. After beating Tony Oakey for the WBU light heavyweight title at the Mountbatten Centre on Oakey's home turf whilst being given only 48 hours notice to box, Barney outclassed the home fighter comfortably at which point a near riot broke out at the venue
