= Andre Dirrell =

American boxer (born 1983)

Personal information
- Nicknames: The Matrix; The Resurrected
- Born: September 7, 1983 (age 43) Flint, Michigan, U.S.
- Height: 6 ft 1 in (185 cm)
- Weight: Super middleweight Light heavyweight

Boxing career
- Reach: 75 in (191 cm)
- Stance: Southpaw; Orthodox

Boxing record
- Total fights: 32
- Wins: 29
- Win by KO: 19
- Losses: 3
Medal record
Men's amateur boxing
Representing United States
Olympic Games
| Bronze medal – third place | 2004 Athens | Middleweight |

Andre Dirrell (born September 7, 1983) is an American professional boxer.

As an amateur, he won a bronze medal in the middleweight division at the 2004 Olympics. His younger brother Anthony Dirrell is also a professional boxer.

== Amateur career ==
Dirrell and his younger brother Anthony began boxing while still in elementary school in their hometown of Flint, Michigan. The brothers have been trained from the beginning by grandfather Leon "Bumper" Lawson Sr., a former sparring partner of Muhammad Ali, and uncle Leon Jr.

Dirrell was a standout as an amateur and won the 2003 United States national amateur championships at middleweight. He also competed at the 2003 Pan American Games, with his results being:

- Lost to Yordanis Despaigne (Cuba) 20-21

He qualified for the Olympic Games by finishing in first place at the 1st AIBA American 2004 Olympic Qualifying Tournament in Tijuana, Mexico. Prior to the Athens Games he won the 2004 Acropolis Boxing Cup in Athens, Greece by defeating Cuba's Yordanis Despaigne in the final of the middleweight division.

He won the middleweight bronze medal for the United States at the 2004 Olympics in Athens, Greece. His results were:

- Defeated Ha Dabateer (China) 25–18
- Defeated Nabil Kassel (Algeria) RSC 2 (1:59)
- Defeated Yordanis Despaigne (Cuba) 21–20
- Lost to Gennady Golovkin (Kazakhstan) 18–23

Dirrell completed an amateur record of 210–26.

== Professional career ==
Dirrell began his professional career in 2005. A southpaw possessing exceptional athleticism and the ability to switch-hit, he was considered among boxing's top young prospects following an extensive amateur career. Dirrell defeated future world title challenger Curtis Stevens on HBO's Boxing After Dark in June 2007.

=== Super Six World Boxing Classic ===
Dirrell was one of the six super-middleweights who competed in Showtime's Super Six World Boxing Classic, a boxing tournament, along with Arthur Abraham, Andre Ward, Carl Froch, Mikkel Kessler and Jermain Taylor. His first fight and only loss was a split decision to England's Carl Froch on October 17, 2009, for the WBC Super Middleweight Championship. Two of the judges scored the fight 115–112 for Froch, with the third scoring it 114–113 for Dirrell.

On March 27, 2010, Dirrell faced undefeated former Middleweight Champion Arthur Abraham in Detroit, Michigan. In the fourth round, Dirrell knocked Abraham down for the first time in his career. Dirrell was outboxing Abraham throughout the bout and comfortably ahead on the scorecards 97–92, 98–91, and 97–92. In the 11th round, a slick spot in the corner of the ring caused Dirrell to slip to one knee. While down, Abraham delivered a punch to the chin of Dirrell; a delayed reaction was followed by Dirrell lying on the ground, unconscious and shaking. The referee ruled the blow by Abraham an intentional foul and awarded Dirrell a victory via disqualification. Some critics contested the ending of the fight, claiming that Dirrell may have overreacted after Abraham's final punch. However, Dirrell said he was really knocked out and did not know what happened after he fell down.

On October 7, 2010, Dirrell declined to face his friend and eventual Super Six tournament winner Andre Ward, and announced that he was withdrawing from the tournament due to neurological issues.

=== After Super Six ===
Dirrell took a 21-month layoff to heal from the neurological injuries sustained in the Abraham fight. Dirrell defeated Darryl Cunningham via second-round technical knockout.

Thirteen months after that, Dirrell made a return to the ring with a unanimous decision win against Michael Gbenga after knocking him down in round 9.

Andre was set to headline Friday Night Fights on April 12, 2013, but withdrew for undisclosed reasons.

Eighteen months after the Gbenga fight, Dirrell returned to score a fifth-round KO against Vladine Biosse.

==== Dirrell vs. DeGale ====
On May 23, 2015, Andre Dirrell fought against British star James DeGale at the Agganis Arena in Boston. DeGale gained two knockdowns in the second round, which proved to be the difference as he won a unanimous decision over Dirrell to win a 168-pound world title. DeGale won 114–112 on two judges' scorecards and 117–109 on the third.

==== Dirrell vs. Uzcategui I ====
On May 20, 2017, Dirrell faced Jose Uzcategui for the vacant IBF interim super middleweight title. Uzcategui was disqualified in the eighth round for punching after the bell, and Dirrell was awarded the DQ victory. After the fight was stopped, Dirrell's trainer and uncle Leon Lawson approached Uzcategui and sucker-punched him before fleeing the scene. After the incident, Dirrell apologized for his trainer's actions.

==== Dirrell vs. Uzcategui II ====
In the rematch, Uzcategui dominated Dirrell over eight rounds, and forced Dirrell's corner to stop the fight right at the beginning of the ninth round.

==== Dirrell vs Cabrera ====
In his comeback fight, Dirrell fought and defeated Juan Ubalado Cabrera via KO in the fifth round.

==== Dirrell vs Brooker ====
On July 31, 2021, Dirrell fought Christopher Booker. Dirrell finished his opponent early, by dropping him three times in the third round, forcing the referee to stop the fight.

== Professional boxing record ==
| 31 fights | 28 wins | 3 losses |
|---|---|---|
| By knockout | 18 | 1 |
| By decision | 8 | 2 |
| By disqualification | 2 | 0 |

| No. | Result | Record | Opponent | Type | Round, time | Date | Location | Notes |
|---|---|---|---|---|---|---|---|---|
| 31 | Win | 28–3 | (United Kingdom) Jimmy Pownall | RTD | 3 (10), 3:00 | Jul 31, 2021 | (United Kingdom) Motorpoint Arena, Nottingham, England | |
| 30 | Win | 27–3 | (Dominican Republic) Juan Ubaldo Cabrera | KO | 5 (10), 1:36 | Dec 21, 2019 | (United States) Toyota Arena, Ontario, California, U.S. | |
| 29 | Loss | 26–3 | (Venezuela) José Uzcátegui | RTD | 8 (12), 3:00 | Mar 3, 2018 | (United States) Barclays Center, New York City, New York, U.S. | Lost IBF interim super middleweight title |
| 28 | Win | 26–2 | (Venezuela) José Uzcátegui | DQ | 8 (12), 3:00 | May 20, 2017 | (United States) MGM National Harbor, Oxon Hill, Maryland, U.S. | Won vacant IBF interim super middleweight title; Uzcátegui disqualified for hitting after the bell |
| 27 | Win | 25–2 | (Australia) Blake Caparello | UD | 10 | Apr 29, 2016 | (United States) Etess Arena, Atlantic City, New Jersey, U.S. | |
| 26 | Loss | 24–2 | (United Kingdom) James DeGale | UD | 12 | May 23, 2015 | (United States) Agganis Arena, Boston, Massachusetts, U.S. | For vacant IBF super middleweight title |
| 25 | Win | 24–1 | (United States) Derek Edwards | UD | 12 | Dec 19, 2014 | Colisée Pepsi, Quebec City, Quebec, Canada | |
| 24 | Win | 23–1 | (United States) Nick Brinson | TKO | 4 (10), 2:12 | Oct 8, 2014 | (United States) Beau Rivage, Biloxi, Mississippi, U.S. | |
| 23 | Win | 22–1 | (Cape Verde) Vladine Biosse | TKO | 5 (10), 2:46 | Aug 1, 2014 | (United States) Little Creek Casino Hotel and Resort, Shelton, Washington, U.S. | |
| 22 | Win | 21–1 | (Ghana) Michael Gbenga | UD | 10 | Feb 2, 2013 | (United States) Convention Center, McAllen, Texas, U.S. | |
| 21 | Win | 20–1 | (United States) Darryl Cunningham | TKO | 2 (10), 2:05 | Dec 30, 2011 | (United States) Morongo Casino Resort & Spa, Cabazon, California, U.S. | |
| 20 | Win | 19–1 | (Germany) Arthur Abraham | DQ | 11 (12), 1:13 | Mar 27, 2010 | (United States) Joe Louis Arena, Detroit, Michigan, U.S. | Super Six World Boxing Classic: group stage 2; Abraham disqualified for hitting after a slip |
| 19 | Loss | 18–1 | (United Kingdom) Carl Froch | SD | 12 | Oct 17, 2009 | (United Kingdom) Trent FM Arena, Nottingham, England | For WBC super middleweight title; Super Six World Boxing Classic: group stage 1 |
| 18 | Win | 18–0 | (United States) Derrick Findley | RTD | 6 (10), 3:00 | Mar 28, 2009 | (United States) Buffalo Run Casino, Miami, Oklahoma, U.S. | |
| 17 | Win | 17–0 | (Russia) Victor Oganov | TKO | 6 (12), 0:28 | Nov 1, 2008 | (United States) Home Depot Center, Carson, California, U.S. | Won vacant WBO–NABO interim super middleweight title |
| 16 | Win | 16–0 | (United States) Mike Paschall | TKO | 4 (10), 1:32 | Aug 2, 2008 | (United States) Emerald Queen Casino, Tacoma, Washington, U.S. | |
| 15 | Win | 15–0 | (United States) Anthony Hanshaw | TKO | 5 (10), 1:13 | May 2, 2008 | (United States) Chumash Casino Resort, Santa Ynez, California, U.S. | |
| 14 | Win | 14–0 | (United States) Shannon Miller | TKO | 3 (6), 1:58 | Feb 1, 2008 | (United States) Grand Casino, Hinckley, Minnesota, U.S. | |
| 13 | Win | 13–0 | (United States) William Johnson | KO | 1 (8) | Dec 6, 2007 | (United States) Tachi Palace Hotel & Casino, Lemoore, California, U.S. | |
| 12 | Win | 12–0 | (United States) Curtis Stevens | UD | 10 | Jun 16, 2007 | (United States) Mohegan Sun Arena, Montville, Connecticut, U.S. | |
| 11 | Win | 11–0 | (United States) Kenny Kost | UD | 8 | Feb 16, 2007 | (United States) Playboy Mansion, Beverly Hills, California, U.S. | |
| 10 | Win | 10–0 | (United States) Cullen Rogers | TKO | 3 (8), 1:19 | Dec 22, 2006 | (United States) Perani Arena and Event Center, Flint, Michigan, U.S. | |
| 9 | Win | 9–0 | (United States) James Sundin | TKO | 2 (6), 2:33 | Nov 17, 2006 | (United States) Soboba Casino, San Jacinto, California, U.S. | |
| 8 | Win | 8–0 | (United States) Marcus Don Hall | TKO | 3 (6), 1:57 | Jun 23, 2006 | (United States) Oakland Arena, Oakland, California, U.S. | |
| 7 | Win | 7–0 | (United States) Alfonso Rocha | UD | 6 | May 25, 2006 | (United States) Pechanga Resort & Casino, Temecula, California, U.S. | |
| 6 | Win | 6–0 | (United States) Mike Eatmon | UD | 6 | Apr 21, 2006 | (United States) Omar Shrine Temple, Mount Pleasant, South Carolina, U.S. | |
| 5 | Win | 5–0 | (Mexico) Juan Camacho | KO | 2 (4), 2:42 | Aug 18, 2005 | (United States) HP Pavilion, San Jose, California, U.S. | |
| 4 | Win | 4–0 | (United States) Carl Cockerham | UD | 6 | Apr 15, 2005 | (United States) Northern Quest Resort & Casino, Airway Heights, Washington, U.S. | |
| 3 | Win | 3–0 | (United States) Jacob Rodriguez | KO | 2 (4), 1:12 | Mar 10, 2005 | (United States) Michael's Eighth Avenue, Glen Burnie, Maryland, U.S. | |
| 2 | Win | 2–0 | (United States) Walter Coles | KO | 1 (4), 2:16 | Feb 11, 2005 | (United States) Philips Arena, Atlanta, Georgia, U.S. | |
| 1 | Win | 1–0 | (United States) Carlos Jones | TKO | 4 (4), 2:50 | Jan 27, 2005 | (United States) Michael's Eighth Avenue, Glen Burnie, Maryland, U.S. | Professional debut |

Sporting positions
Amateur boxing titles
| Previous: Julius Fogle | U.S. middleweight champion 2003 | Next: James Johnson |
Regional boxing titles
| New title | WBO–NABO super middleweight champion Interim title November 1, 2008 – March 2009; Vacated | Vacant Title next held by Edison Miranda |
World boxing titles
| New title | IBF super middleweight champion Interim title May 20, 2017 – March 3, 2018 | Succeeded by José Uzcátegui |
