= Carl Froch =

English boxer (born 1977)

Carl Froch MBE
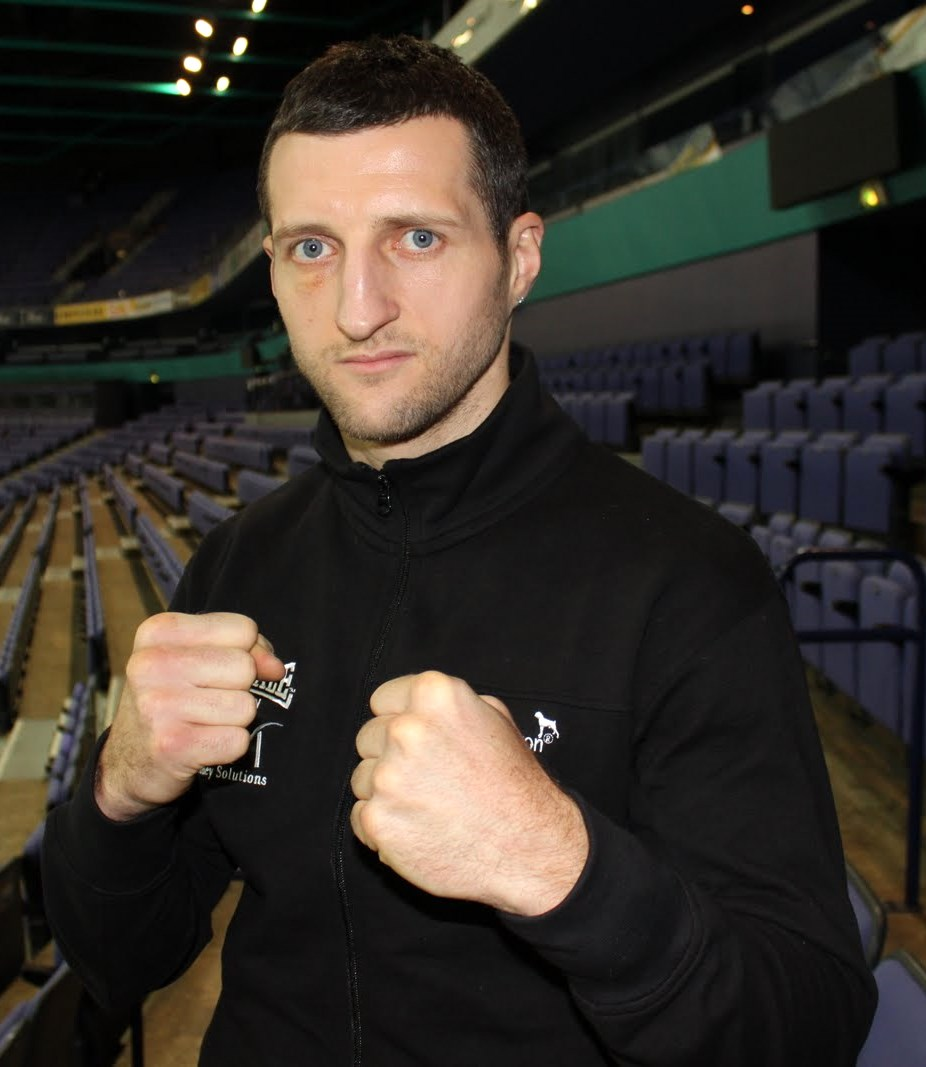
- Froch in 2010

Personal information
- Nickname: The Cobra
- Born: Carl Martin Froch; 2 July 1977 (age 49) Nottingham, England
- Height: 6 ft 1 in (185 cm)
- Weight: Super-middleweight

Boxing career
- Reach: 75 in (191 cm)
- Stance: Orthodox

Boxing record
- Total fights: 35
- Wins: 33
- Win by KO: 24
- Losses: 2
Medal record
Men's amateur boxing
Representing England
English National Championships
| Gold medal – first place | 1999 Barnsley | Middleweight |
| Gold medal – first place | 2001 Barnsley | Middleweight |
World Championships
| Bronze medal – third place | Belfast 2001 | Middleweight |

Carl Martin Froch (/ˈfrɒtʃ/; born 2 July 1977) is a British former professional boxer who competed from 2002 to 2014, and has since worked as a boxing analyst and commentator. He held multiple world championships in the super-middleweight division, including the World Boxing Council (WBC) title twice between 2008 and 2011, the International Boxing Federation (IBF) title from 2012 to 2015, and the World Boxing Association (WBA) title (Unified and Regular versions) between 2013 and 2015. At regional level, he held the British and Commonwealth super-middleweight titles between 2004 and 2008, and won the Lonsdale Belt in 2006. As an amateur, Froch won a middleweight bronze medal at the 2001 World Championships, and the ABA title twice.

Froch was voted Fighter of the Year for 2012 by BoxRec. In 2013, the UK edition of GQ magazine voted him Sportsman of the Year. He reached a peak pound for pound ranking of sixth by BoxRec and The Ring magazine, and in 2013 was listed by the BBC as the best active British boxer, pound for pound. Froch was inducted into the International Boxing Hall of Fame as part of the class of 2023.

== Early life ==
Carl Martin Froch was born in Colwick, Nottingham, in 1977, the son of Carol (Douglas) and Frank Froch. His paternal grandparents were Polish (his paternal grandfather also had German ancestry), while Carl's mother's family is English. Early in his life Froch wanted to become a footballer and play for Nottingham Forest, his local football team, and has stated that he would have loved to fight at the City Ground. He is a supporter of the club and occasionally trained at its training ground before fights. He has also appeared on the Sky Sports Saturday morning football show Soccer AM the week before a fight.

== Amateur career ==
Froch began boxing at the Phoenix ABC in Gedling, Nottingham. As an amateur, he won two ABA middleweight titles in 1999 and 2001 and a bronze medal at the 2001 World Amateur Boxing Championships before turning pro and having his first pro fight in March 2002. As an amateur, Froch lost to American Peter Manfredo Jr.

== Professional career ==
=== Early career ===
Froch was trained by Robert McCracken throughout his professional career. He was managed and promoted by Mick Hennessy until 2011, and from thereon by Eddie Hearn.

Froch made his debut at the age of 24 in March 2002. He fought at the York Hall in Bethnal Green, London against veteran 36 year old journeyman Michael Pinnock (4–52–8, 2 KOs), who weighed 10 pounds more than Froch, in a scheduled six-round bout. Froch won the fight via a fourth-round technical knockout. Froch fought a further four times that year, winning them all with three coming by first-round knockout against Ojay Abrahams, Darren Covill and Mike Duffield and one victory coming by a points decision win against Paul Bonson.

Froch started 2003 with a knockout win against Valery Odin, fighting for the first time at the Nottingham Arena, the same arena he would win his first world title five years later. Froch would next fight in March, April and October of that year defeating Varujan Davtyan and Michael Monaghan by knockout and Vage Kocharyan via points decision, respectively. At this point in his career, Froch racked up nine wins in as many fights, with seven coming by way of knockout.

In November 2003, Froch fought fellow unbeaten British contender Alan Page (8–0, 4 KOs) at the Derby Storm Arena in Derby for the vacant English super-middleweight title. In round seven, Froch landed a hard right followed by an uppercut, although Page didn't go down, referee John Keane stepped in to call an end to the fight.

=== British and Commonwealth champion ===
In 2004, Froch won the Commonwealth and vacant British super-middleweight titles by defeating Charles Adamu and Damon Hague respectively. He has defended both against Matthew Barney, Brian Magee and Tony Dodson and the Commonwealth belt alone against Ruben Groenewald and Dale Westerman.

Following a victory over the Russian Sergey Tatevosyan, on 9 November 2007 at Trent FM Arena in Nottingham, he stopped the veteran former world champion Robin Reid, after which Reid retired from the sport for four years.

=== WBC super-middleweight champion ===
==== Froch vs. Pascal ====
On 6 December 2008, Froch fought Canadian Jean Pascal for the vacant WBC super-middleweight title and won by unanimous decision a hard-fought twelve-round brawl. Both combatants showed enormous grit and determination, landing and taking huge shots from one another without even flinching. After the fight, it was revealed that Froch had sustained a perforated eardrum and a cracked rib in his final sparring session before the fight. Froch's promoter Mick Hennessy gave Froch the opportunity to withdraw from the fight, but Froch refused. Since the fight, Froch and Pascal (who has since become a light-heavyweight champion) have become friends on a personal level.

==== Froch vs. Taylor ====
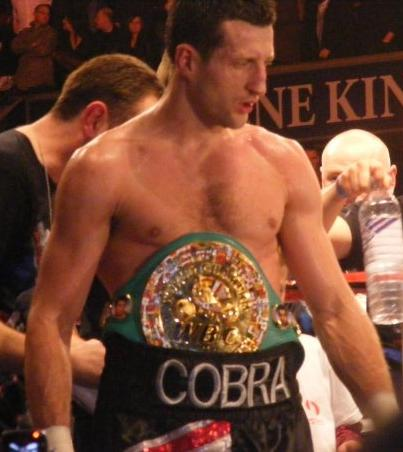
Froch with the WBC title, 2009

On 25 April 2009, Froch fought Jermain Taylor in his first defence of his WBC super-middleweight title, at the Foxwoods Resort in Mashantucket, Connecticut. Froch survived a third-round knockdown – the first of his entire career, amateur and professional – and, behind on two of the three judges' scorecards coming into the final round, he managed to stop his opponent with 14 seconds remaining in the twelfth round to retain his WBC super-middleweight title.

After the fight, Froch was quick to send out a verbal challenge to unbeaten Welsh boxer Joe Calzaghe and was also quoted as saying "Kessler, Pavlik, Hopkins, I want them all to feel the force."

=== Super Six World Boxing Classic ===
On 13 July 2009, Froch agreed to take part in the Super Six World Boxing Classic super-middleweight tournament devised by Showtime, with the winner of the tournament winning the WBA, and WBC super-middleweight titles. The tournament featured six boxers including Andre Dirrell, Mikkel Kessler, Arthur Abraham, Jermain Taylor, Andre Ward and Froch. Froch's first opponent in the Super Six was Andre Dirrell.

==== Froch vs. Dirrell ====
The bout took place in Nottingham on 17 October and Froch's WBC title was on the line. Froch won the fight and retained his title with a split decision victory over the previously undefeated Dirrell. Two of the judges scored the bout 115–112 in favour of Froch, with the other scoring the bout 114–113 in favour of Dirrell.

==== Froch vs. Kessler ====
Froch's next fight was against Mikkel Kessler, who lost the WBA super-middleweight title to Andre Ward. Froch's WBC title was again on the line. In a closely fought contest in Kessler's home country of Denmark where both men had great moments throughout the fight, Kessler took Froch's title and inflicted Froch's first professional defeat via unanimous decision, the judges scoring the contest by margins of 116–112, 115–113, and 117–111. The scoring was somewhat controversial to Froch fans only, as some boxing had scored the fight much closer, with some awarding Froch the win and others scoring it a draw. Froch later whined that the fight was close and that he believes the decision would have gone his way if the event had been held in Nottingham. The fight was a contender for the 2010 Fight of the Year.

==== Froch vs. Abraham ====
Froch faced former IBF middleweight champion Arthur Abraham in the third stage in Helsinki, Finland at the Hartwall Finland. Froch feared that if he fought in Abraham's adoptive home country there was a possibility of receiving a bad decision. However, since an eye injury forced Mikkel Kessler to relinquish his WBC title and resign from the tournament, Froch-Abraham was for the vacant WBC super-middleweight title. Both Froch and Abraham came off of a loss in stage two of the Super Six. Abraham lost after a disqualification against former Froch victim Andre Dirrell.

Froch regained the WBC super-middleweight title by gaining a unanimous decision victory over Abraham, with the judges' scorecards reading the 120–108 twice, and 119–109, reflecting the one-sided nature of the bout.

==== Froch vs. Johnson ====
Following his victory over Abraham, Froch entered the semi-final stage of the tournament. His opponent on 4 June 2011 in Atlantic City, New Jersey was Glen Johnson. Froch retained his title with a majority decision victory, with the judges' scorecards reading 117–111, 116–112, and 114–114.

==== Froch vs. Ward ====
Carl Froch lost in the final of the Super Six tournament in a bout against undefeated WBA super-middleweight champion Andre Ward. The vacant Ring magazine super-middleweight title was on the line in the fight, as well as Froch's and Ward's super-middleweight titles. In the first seven rounds, Ward outboxed Froch, successfully using his jab to neutralise Froch and beating him to the punch from a distance and at close range. In the later rounds, Ward seemed to take his foot off the gas, leaving Froch to win a couple of rounds near the end of the fight, though they were close and competitive rounds. The judges' scorecards were 115–113, 115–113, and 118–110, all in favour of Ward. Ward won the vacant Ring magazine super-middleweight title and is also regarded as becoming lineal champion with the win, despite some independent sources rating undefeated IBF title holder Lucian Bute #1 or 2. The fight peaked at 580,000 viewers on Showtime.

=== IBF super-middleweight champion ===
==== Froch vs. Bute ====
The IBF officially enforced Carl Froch as Lucian Bute's number one mandatory challenger. The fight, billed as "No Easy Way Out", took place on 26 May 2012 in Froch's hometown of Nottingham. Despite being the underdog with bookmakers, critics and fans around the world, Froch dominated Bute throughout the fight to become the new IBF super-middleweight champion via TKO in round five, making Froch a three-time world champion.

==== Froch vs. Mack ====
After the Bute fight and acquiring the IBF title, Froch defeated Yusaf Mack via knockout. The British website BoxRec named Froch the "Fighter of the Year" in the end of 2012.

=== WBA (Regular) and WBC super-middleweight champion ===
==== Froch vs. Kessler II ====
On 26 May 2013 (the match was scheduled for 25 May, but started after midnight BST), Froch faced WBA (Regular) champion Kessler in a rematch of their fight in 2010. This time it was Froch that was victorious via unanimous decision at The O2 Arena in London, with the judges scoring the bout 118–110, 116–112, and 115–113.

==== Froch vs. Groves ====
The IBF installed George Groves as Froch's mandatory challenger, their bout taking place on 23 November at the Phones4u Arena in Manchester, with Froch's WBA (Regular) and IBF super-middleweight titles on the line. Despite being floored for only the second time in his career by a left hook right hand from Groves in the first round, Froch retained his titles with a TKO victory in round nine. There was significant controversy as many observers felt that referee Howard Foster stepped in to end the contest prematurely. The three scoring judges had scored Groves ahead of Froch before Groves was shaken by some powerful Froch blows in the ninth. The controversial ending prompted a widespread demand for a rematch to be fought between the two.

On 24 January 2014, the IBF ordered a rematch between Froch and Groves, giving Froch 90 days to fight Groves or relinquish his IBF title.

==== Froch vs. Groves II ====
On 13 February 2014, it was announced by Eddie Hearn and Matchroom Boxing that Froch v Groves II would take place on 31 May 2014 at Wembley Stadium in London. Froch was quoted that the fight was what the "British public want to see" and that was his reason for taking the option to give Groves a rematch while defending his WBA (Unified) and IBF super-middleweight titles. As soon as tickets went on sale, 60,000 tickets were sold in under an hour and a further 20,000 tickets were made available, making this the biggest ever attendance for a boxing match in Britain since the Second World War.

The fight was a more cagey affair than the first match, with both fighters initially looking to outbox each other. Froch was stronger in the earlier rounds, with Jim Watt unofficially scoring the earlier rounds in favour of the champion on his Sky Sports scorecard. By the end of the seventh round, both Richie Woodhall and Steve Bunce had the fight scored four rounds to three for Froch on the BBC scorecards. Groves came out fighting in the eighth round before Froch got him pinned against the ropes and delivered a right hand blow which knocked Groves out. It was later named Knockout of the Year by The Ring for 2014.

== Fighting style ==
Froch was known for his long jab, which he used to maintain distance before delivering the right straight, with both punches often launched from hip height. While lacking some traditional defensive skills, Froch was renowned for his high levels of durability and resilience. Meticulous about his fitness regimen, he kept log books of all his training camps, beginning in 2002 until his 2014 retirement. He would use these to assess his performance in each camp against previous personal bests and records, helping him to decide when it was time to retire.

== Personal life ==
His wife Rachael Froch, whom he married in May 2019, is a British glamour model. Together they have a son and two daughters. Froch has publicly stated his belief in a flat Earth on numerous occasions. Froch has a YouTube channel called "Froch On Fighting".

== Professional boxing record ==
| 35 fights | 33 wins | 2 losses |
|---|---|---|
| By knockout | 24 | 0 |
| By decision | 9 | 2 |

| No. | Result | Record | Opponent | Type | Round, time | Date | Location | Notes |
|---|---|---|---|---|---|---|---|---|
| 35 | Win | 33–2 | George Groves | KO | 8 (12), 2:28 | 31 May 2014 | Wembley Stadium, London, England | Retained WBA (Unified) and IBF super-middleweight titles |
| 34 | Win | 32–2 | George Groves | TKO | 9 (12), 1:33 | 23 Nov 2013 | Phones4u Arena, Manchester, England | Retained WBA (Unified) and IBF super-middleweight titles |
| 33 | Win | 31–2 | Mikkel Kessler | UD | 12 | 25 May 2013 | The O2 Arena, London, England | Retained IBF super-middleweight title; Won WBA (Unified) super-middleweight title |
| 32 | Win | 30–2 | Yusaf Mack | KO | 3 (12), 2:30 | 17 Nov 2012 | Capital FM Arena, Nottingham, England | Retained IBF super-middleweight title |
| 31 | Win | 29–2 | Lucian Bute | TKO | 5 (12), 1:05 | 26 May 2012 | Capital FM Arena, Nottingham, England | Won IBF super-middleweight title |
| 30 | Loss | 28–2 | Andre Ward | UD | 12 | 17 Dec 2011 | Boardwalk Hall, Atlantic City, New Jersey, US | Lost WBC super-middleweight title; For WBA (Super) and vacant The Ring super middleweight titles; Super Six World Boxing Classic: final |
| 29 | Win | 28–1 | Glen Johnson | MD | 12 | 4 Jun 2011 | Boardwalk Hall, Atlantic City, New Jersey, US | Retained WBC super-middleweight title; Super Six World Boxing Classic: semi-final |
| 28 | Win | 27–1 | Arthur Abraham | UD | 12 | 27 Nov 2010 | Hartwall Arena, Helsinki, Finland | Won vacant WBC super-middleweight title; Super Six World Boxing Classic: group stage 3 |
| 27 | Loss | 26–1 | Mikkel Kessler | UD | 12 | 24 Apr 2010 | MCH Arena, Herning, Denmark | Lost WBC super-middleweight title; Super Six World Boxing Classic: group stage 2 |
| 26 | Win | 26–0 | Andre Dirrell | SD | 12 | 17 Oct 2009 | Trent FM Arena, Nottingham, England | Retained WBC super-middleweight title; Super Six World Boxing Classic: group stage 1 |
| 25 | Win | 25–0 | Jermain Taylor | TKO | 12 (12), 2:46 | 25 Apr 2009 | Foxwoods Resort Casino, Ledyard, Connecticut, US | Retained WBC super-middleweight title |
| 24 | Win | 24–0 | Jean Pascal | UD | 12 | 6 Dec 2008 | Trent FM Arena, Nottingham, England | Won vacant WBC super-middleweight title |
| 23 | Win | 23–0 | Albert Rybacki | TKO | 4 (12), 2:35 | 10 May 2008 | Trent FM Arena, Nottingham, England | |
| 22 | Win | 22–0 | Robin Reid | RTD | 5 (12), 3:00 | 9 Nov 2007 | Trent FM Arena, Nottingham, England | Retained British super-middleweight title |
| 21 | Win | 21–0 | Sergey Tatevosyan | TKO | 2 (12), 2:54 | 23 Mar 2007 | Trent FM Arena, Nottingham, England | |
| 20 | Win | 20–0 | Tony Dodson | KO | 3 (12), 2:55 | 24 Nov 2006 | Trent FM Arena, Nottingham, England | Retained British and Commonwealth super-middleweight titles |
| 19 | Win | 19–0 | Brian Magee | KO | 11 (12), 1:21 | 26 May 2006 | York Hall, London, England | Retained British and Commonwealth super-middleweight titles |
| 18 | Win | 18–0 | Dale Westerman | TKO | 9 (12), 1:45 | 17 Feb 2006 | York Hall, London, England | Retained Commonwealth super-middleweight title |
| 17 | Win | 17–0 | Ruben Groenewald | TKO | 5 (12), 2:25 | 2 Dec 2005 | Trent FM Arena, Nottingham, England | Retained Commonwealth super-middleweight title |
| 16 | Win | 16–0 | Matthew Barney | PTS | 12 | 9 Jul 2005 | Trent FM Arena, Nottingham, England | Retained British and Commonwealth super-middleweight titles |
| 15 | Win | 15–0 | Henry Porras | TKO | 8 (10), 0:56 | 21 Apr 2005 | The Avalon, Los Angeles, California, US | |
| 14 | Win | 14–0 | Damon Hague | TKO | 1 (12), 2:10 | 24 Sep 2004 | Trent FM Arena, Nottingham, England | Retained Commonwealth super-middleweight title; Won vacant British super-middleweight title |
| 13 | Win | 13–0 | Mark Woolnaugh | TKO | 11 (12), 1:47 | 2 Jun 2004 | Trent FM Arena, Nottingham, England | Retained Commonwealth super-middleweight title |
| 12 | Win | 12–0 | Charles Adamu | PTS | 12 | 12 Mar 2004 | Trent FM Arena, Nottingham, England | Won Commonwealth super-middleweight title |
| 11 | Win | 11–0 | Dmitry Adamovich | TKO | 2 (8), 1:07 | 30 Jan 2004 | Goresbrook Leisure Centre, London, England | |
| 10 | Win | 10–0 | Alan Page | TKO | 7 (10), 1:40 | 28 Nov 2003 | Storm Arena, Derby, England | Won vacant English super-middleweight title |
| 9 | Win | 9–0 | Vage Kocharyan | PTS | 8 | 4 Oct 2003 | Alexandra Palace, London, England | |
| 8 | Win | 8–0 | Michael Monaghan | TKO | 3 (8), 2:18 | 16 Apr 2003 | Trent FM Arena, Nottingham, England | |
| 7 | Win | 7–0 | Varuzhan Davtyan | TKO | 5 (8), 1:44 | 5 Mar 2003 | York Hall, London, England | |
| 6 | Win | 6–0 | Valery Odin | TKO | 6 (8), 2:15 | 28 Jan 2003 | Trent FM Arena, Nottingham, England | |
| 5 | Win | 5–0 | Mike Duffield | TKO | 1 (6), 1:14 | 21 Dec 2002 | Goresbrook Leisure Centre, London, England | |
| 4 | Win | 4–0 | Paul Bonson | PTS | 6 | 25 Oct 2002 | York Hall, London, England | |
| 3 | Win | 3–0 | Darren Covell | TKO | 1 (6), 2:03 | 23 Aug 2002 | York Hall, London, England | |
| 2 | Win | 2–0 | Ojay Abrahams | KO | 1 (6), 2:18 | 10 May 2002 | York Hall, London, England | |
| 1 | Win | 1–0 | Michael Pinnock | TKO | 4 (6), 2:03 | 16 Mar 2002 | York Hall, London, England | |

Sporting positions
Amateur boxing titles
| Previous: John Pearce | ABA middleweight champion 1999 | Next: Stephen Swales |
| Previous: Stephen Swales | ABA middleweight champion 2001 | Next: Neil Perkins |
Regional boxing titles
| Inaugural champion | English super-middleweight champion 28 November 2003 – 24 September 2004; Won British title | Vacant Title next held by Ryan Kerr |
| Preceded by Charles Adamu | Commonwealth super-middleweight champion 12 March 2004 – 12 June 2007; Vacated | Vacant Title next held by Jermain Mackey |
| Vacant Title last held by Tony Dodson | British super-middleweight champion 24 September 2004 – December 2008; Vacated | Vacant Title next held by Brian Magee |
World boxing titles
| Vacant Title last held by Joe Calzaghe | WBC super-middleweight champion 6 December 2008 – 24 April 2010 | Succeeded by Mikkel Kessler |
| Vacant Title last held by Mikkel Kessler | WBC super-middleweight champion 27 November 2010 – 17 December 2011 | Succeeded by Andre Ward |
| Preceded by Lucian Bute | IBF super-middleweight champion 26 May 2012 – 3 February 2015; Vacated | Vacant Title next held by James DeGale |
| Vacant Title last held by Joe Calzaghe | WBA super-middleweight champion Unified title 25 May 2013 – 3 February 2015; Status changed | Title discontinued |
| Vacant Title last held by Mikkel Kessler | WBA super-middleweight champion Regular title 3 February 2015 – 8 May 2015; Stripped | Vacant Title next held by Fedor Chudinov |
Awards
| Previous: Adonis Stevenson; TKO1 Chad Dawson | The Ring Knockout of the Year; KO8 George Groves; 2014 | Next: Canelo Álvarez; KO3 James Kirkland |
