= Super Six World Boxing Classic =

Boxing competitions

Original (2009) participants: Ward, Abraham, Froch, Taylor, Kessler, Dirrell (l. to r.). Not pictured are Johnson and Green, who replaced Taylor and Kessler in 2010's Group Stage 3.

The Super Six World Boxing Classic was a professional boxing tournament organized by the Showtime television network in co-operation with Sauerland Event. The tournament was held from 2009 to 2011, with all fights being contested in the super middleweight division. The winner of the tournament, Andre Ward, unified the WBA (Super title), WBC and The Ring Super Middleweight titles.

The competitors entered into the tournament were then-WBA Super Middleweight Champion Mikkel Kessler, then-undefeated WBC Super Middleweight Champion Carl Froch, 2004 Olympic gold medalist Andre Ward, former middleweight champions Jermain Taylor and Arthur Abraham, and 2004 Olympic bronze medalist Andre Dirrell. Taylor and Kessler withdrew during the tournament and were replaced by former light heavyweight champion Glen Johnson and super middleweight contender Allan Green.

The first matches took place on October 17, 2009. After three group stages, two semi-final matches were set. Ward defeated Abraham in the first, held on May 14, 2011. Froch defeated Johnson in the second, held on June 4, 2011. After Froch defeated Johnson, he was elevated to the number 2 rating by Ring Magazine. With Ward being rated number 1, the final pitted the number 1 and number 2 fighters against one another. This allowed for the Ring title vacancy to be filled at the tournament final.

WBA Champion Ward beat WBC Champion Froch in the final of the tournament on 17 December 2011 at Boardwalk Hall, in Atlantic City, New Jersey, United States.

== Format ==
All bouts were scheduled for 12 rounds.

The original format was based on a slate of six fighters who would compete throughout the group stage of the tournament, folding down to semi-final and final matches. The original format was adjusted due to numerous injuries and withdrawals amongst the original six boxers, and the insertion of replacement boxers at different stages through the tournament.

The competition started with a group stage where each boxer was meant to fight three times. A boxer would be awarded three points for a win by knockout or technical knockout, two points for a win on points (or by disqualification), one point for a draw and 0 points for a loss.

The top four from the group stage continued to the semifinals, matching the leader against no. 4 and no. 2 against no. 3. The winners of the semifinals then proceeded to the tournament final.

The WBC Super Middleweight Championship and WBA Super Middleweight Championship were meant to be on the line for each of the champions' fights, resulting in the unification of the two at the conclusion of the tournament.

Although this unification was potentially jeopardized by the withdrawal of former WBC champion Mikkel Kessler and the non-tournament bout between WBA (Super) Champion Andre Ward and Sakio Bika which followed the withdrawal of Andre Dirrell, both titles remained in the mix following the end of the group stage.

== Participants ==
- Winner
  - (United States) Andre Ward – tournament winner and WBA (Super), WBC and The Ring Super Middleweight Champion. Ward won the WBA title in his Stage 1 fight and defended it to the end of the tournament. Ward won the WBC title from Froch and the vacant Ring Magazine title by defeating Froch in the final.
- Finalists
  - (United Kingdom) Carl Froch – eliminated after defeat by Ward in the final. Froch was WBC champion entering the tournament, lost that title and then regained it during the course of the tournament. He carried the WBC title into the final bout.
- Semi-finalists
  - (Germany) Arthur Abraham – eliminated after defeat by Andre Ward in semifinals.
  - (Jamaica) Glen Johnson – eliminated after defeat by Froch in the semifinals, replacement for Mikkel Kessler after Group Stage 2.
- Round Robin only
  - (United States) Jermain Taylor – withdrew after Group Stage 1
  - (Denmark) Mikkel Kessler – withdrew after Group Stage 2. Entered tournament as WBA champion and lost belt to Andre Ward in first bout; defeated Carl Froch for WBC title in next bout, but vacated title as he withdrew.
  - (United States) Andre Dirrell – withdrew after Group Stage 2.
  - (United States) Allan Green – eliminated after defeat by Glen Johnson in Group Stage 3 Replaced Jermain Taylor after Group Stage 1.

== Promoters ==
- Lou DiBella (promotes Allan Green, Glen Johnson and formerly Jermain Taylor)
- Dan Goossen (promotes Andre Ward)
- Mick Hennessy (promoted Carl Froch prior to his fight with Glen Johnson)
- Matchroom Sport (promotes Carl Froch starting with the Glen Johnson fight)
- Kalle Sauerland (promotes Mikkel Kessler and Arthur Abraham)
- Gary Shaw (promotes Andre Dirrell)

== Group stage ==
=== Group Stage 1 ===
Date	Competitor One	Result	Competitor Two	Venue	Titles
October 17, 2009	Arthur Abraham	KO (12) 2:54	Jermain Taylor	O2 World, Berlin, Germany	None
October 17, 2009	Carl Froch	Split Decision	Andre Dirrell	Trent FM Arena, Nottingham, United Kingdom	Froch retains WBC Super Middleweight Championship
November 21, 2009	Andre Ward	TD (11) 1:42	Mikkel Kessler	Oracle Arena, Oakland, California, United States	Ward takes WBA Super Middleweight Championship. Stopped due to cuts from accidental head clashes.

=== Group Stage 2 ===
Date	Competitor One	Result	Competitor Two	Venue	Titles
March 27, 2010	Andre Dirrell	DQ (11) 1:13	Arthur Abraham	Joe Louis Arena, Detroit, Michigan, United States	None
April 24, 2010	Mikkel Kessler	Unanimous Decision	Carl Froch	MCH Messecenter Herning, Herning, Denmark	Kessler takes WBC Super Middleweight Championship
June 19, 2010	Andre Ward	Unanimous Decision	Allan Green	Oracle Arena, Oakland, California, United States	Ward retains WBA Super Middleweight Championship

=== Group Stage 3 ===
Date	Competitor One	Result	Competitor Two	Venue	Titles
November 6, 2010	Glen Johnson	KO (8) 0:36	Allan Green	MGM Grand, Paradise, Nevada, United States	None
November 27, 2010	Carl Froch	Unanimous Decision	Arthur Abraham	Hartwall Arena, Helsinki, Finland	Froch wins vacant WBC Super Middleweight Championship

=== Group Stage Table ===
Top four fighters – by points – at end of the group stage entered the Knockout stage.

Following table shows final results from the group stage, after the final Group Stage bout of November 27, 2010.

For completeness, results for the three fighters who withdrew from the tournament are shown, though their relative standing in the tournament is not applicable (n/a).

P	Boxer	Fights	Wins	Losses	Draws	Knock Outs	Points	Titles Won	Titles Lost	Super Middleweight Titles at End of Group Stage
1	(United States) Andre Ward	2 (3^{a})	2 (3^{a})	0	0	0	6^{a}	1	0	WBA
2	(United Kingdom) Carl Froch	3	2	1	0	0	4	1	1	WBC
3	(Germany) Arthur Abraham	3	1	2	0	1	3	0	0	--
4	(Jamaica) Glen Johnson‡	1	1	0	0	1	3	0	0	--
5	(United States) Allan Green‡	2	0	2	0	0	0	0	0	--
n/a	(Denmark) Mikkel Kessler^	2	1	1	0	0	2	1	1 (2^{b})	--
n/a	(United States) Andre Dirrell^	2	1	1	0	0	2	0	0	--
n/a	(United States) Jermain Taylor^	1	0	1	0	0	0	0	0	--

^ indicates former participant, withdrawing sometime after Group Stage 1
‡ indicates replacement participant, added sometime after Group Stage 1

a. Andre Ward had 2 actual fights/wins, and was granted an additional forfeit win and 2 points due to the withdrawal of Andre Dirrell.
b. Mikkel Kessler had: won 1 title, lost 1 title, and vacated 1 title due to injury.

== Knockout stage ==
=== Semi-final ===
Date	Competitor One	Result	Competitor Two	Venue	Titles
May 14, 2011	Andre Ward	Unanimous Decision	Arthur Abraham	Home Depot Center, Carson, California, United States	WBA Super Middleweight Championship
June 4, 2011	Carl Froch	Majority Decision	Glen Johnson	Boardwalk Hall, Atlantic City, New Jersey, United States	WBC Super Middleweight Championship

=== Final ===
Date	Competitor One	Result	Competitor Two	Venue	Titles
December 17, 2011	Andre Ward	Unanimous Decision	Carl Froch	Boardwalk Hall, Atlantic City, New Jersey, United States	The Ring, WBA & WBC Super Middleweight Championship

== Controversy with Group Stage 3 ==
A number of developments required multiple adjustments to the original plans for Group Stage 3.

As of August 12, 2010, a venue had not been chosen and ticket sales had not started for the scheduled September 25, 2010, bout between Dirrell and Ward. This was expected to result in a new date for the fight. Instead, on October 7, 2010, it was reported that Andre Dirrell withdrew due to an undisclosed injury. This resulted in a decision to have Ward fight Sakio Bika in a non-tournament bout, which created the possibility that the WBA Championship could have been removed from the tournament. (Ward did defeat Bika, so the WBA Championship remained in the Super Six tournament).

On August 25, 2010, Mikkel Kessler withdrew from the tournament citing an eye injury. On September 6, 2010, the WBC vacated its Super Middleweight Championship, announced that Kessler will be the first contender when he returns from his injury (naming him Champion Emeritus), and announced that it would grant its championship to the winner of the upcoming Group Stage 3 match between its number one contender, Dirrell, and the WBA champion, Ward, to be followed with a mandated WBC title fight against the winner of the Froch-Abraham match.

The promoter for Abraham requested that the WBC rethink its determination that the WBC title should go to the winner of the Dirrell-Ward match. On October 6, 2010, a Showtime press release confirmed that the WBC would grant its championship to the winner of the rescheduled Froch-Abraham match.

On September 13, 2010, it was announced that Carl Froch was suffering from a back injury and would have to delay his fight with Arthur Abraham, which had been scheduled for October 2.

On September 29, 2010, it was reported that former IBF, IBO, Ring Magazine light heavyweight champion and former Ring Magazine Fighter of the Year Glen Johnson would replace Kessler in Group Stage 3.

== Non-Tournament Bouts ==
As part of their contracts with Showtime regarding the Classic, fighters are able to take non-tournament bouts if their schedule permits.

Since Andre Ward already qualified for the semifinals and his planned opponent Andre Dirrell withdrew, a decision was made to have Ward fight Sakio Bika in a non-tournament bout.

After losses in his last two round robin matches, Arthur Abraham elected to take a tune-up bout with Croatian boxer Stjepan Božić before his semifinal match against Andre Ward.

Date	Competitor One	Result	Competitor Two	Venue	Titles
November 27, 2010	Andre Ward	Unanimous Decision	Sakio Bika	Oracle Arena, Oakland, California, United States	Ward retains WBA Super Middleweight Championship
February 12, 2011	Arthur Abraham	TKO (2) 1:01	Stjepan Božić	RWE Rhein-Ruhr Sporthalle, Mülheim, (Germany)	None

== See also ==
- World Boxing Super Series
