= Andre Ward vs. Carl Froch =

Boxing match

- Date: December 17, 2011
- Venue: Boardwalk Hall, Atlantic City, New Jersey, U.S.
- Title(s) on the line: WBA, WBC and vacant The Ring super middleweight titles

Tale of the tape
Boxer	(United States) Andre Ward	(United Kingdom) Carl Froch
Nickname	"S.O.G."	"The Cobra"
Hometown	Oakland, California, U.S.	Nottingham, East Midlands, UK
Pre-fight record	24–0 (13 KO)	28–1 (20 KO)
Age	27 years, 9 months	34 years, 5 months
Height	6 ft 0 in (183 cm)	6 ft 1 in (185 cm)
Weight	168 lb (76 kg)	167 1/2 lb (76 kg)
Style	Orthodox	Orthodox
Recognition	WBA; Super Middleweight Champion; The Ring; No. 1 Ranked Super Middleweight; The Ring No. 9 ranked pound-for-pound fighter	WBC; Super Middleweight Champion; The Ring; No. 2 Ranked Super Middleweight

Result
- Ward defeats Froch via unanimous decision.

Andre Ward vs. Carl Froch was the Super Six World Boxing Classic Final championship fight for the WBC, WBA, & vacant The Ring super middleweight titles. The bout was held on December 17, 2011, at the Boardwalk Hall in Atlantic City, New Jersey, United States. and was televised on Showtime.

== Background ==
From the time it was announced in July 2009 until the final bout just before Halloween 2011, the super middleweight tournament went on for about 800 days.

Froch was due to face Ward in Atlantic City on October 29 in the final of the Super Six, but Ward's injury required the rescheduling of the bout to December 17, 2011. The fight was promoted by Matchroom Sport (promoted Froch) and Goossen Tutor Promotions (promoted Ward)

=== Ward ===
Ward advanced to the final by winning his tournament bouts. He won his title against Kessler in his opening bout, scoring a dominant 11th-round technical decision. Ward beat Allan Green in his second bout. Ward's Group Stage 3 bout called off when Dirrell, his 2004 U.S. Olympic teammate, dropped out of the tournament. Ward instead faced contender Sakio Bika outside of the tournament and won a decision. In his May semifinal fight, Ward defeated Abraham to advance to the final.{

=== Froch ===
Froch defeated Dirrell on a split decision in England in his opening-round bout. Then Froch lost a decision (and his title) to Denmark's Kessler in Denmark in Group Stage 2.

However, after Kessler dropped out, Froch met Abraham for the vacant belt in Group Stage 3 and won a decision to claim his title. Froch advanced to the final in June by scoring a majority decision against Johnson.

== The fight ==
Although the fight was competitive throughout, Ward was able to use his superior speed and movement to help him outbox Froch for the first half of the encounter, neutralizing his attack and beating him to the punch at both distance and close range. Ward seemed to ease off in the later rounds and Froch began to edge them, looking the stronger by the end of the bout. However, all three judges felt Ward had done enough to become the new unified super middleweight champion.

== Main card ==
Confirmed bouts:

- Super Middleweight Championship (United States) Andre Ward (c) vs. (United Kingdom) Carl Froch (c)

Ward def. Froch by unanimous decision (115-113, 115-113, 118-110) to retain the WBA (super) Super Middleweight title, and won the WBC, Ring Magazine world Super Middleweight Titles. Ward also became the Super Six world boxing classic tournament winner.

=== Preliminary card ===
- Heavyweight bout (United States) John Lennox vs. (United States) Jeramiah Witherspoon

Lennox def. Witherspoon by TKO :50 of round 3

- Light Heavyweight bout (United States) Cornelius White vs. (Cuba) Yordanis Despaigne

White def. Despaigne by unanimous decision (60-53, 59-55, 59-55)

- Welterweight bout (United Kingdom) Kell Brook vs. (Puerto Rico) Luis Galarza

Brook def. Galarza by TKO 1:38 of round 5

- Light Heavyweight bout (United States) Edison Miranda vs. (Australia) Kariz Kariuki

Miranda def. Kariuki by TKO in 2:04 of round 5

- Heavyweight bout (Australia) Bowie Tupou vs. (United States) Donnell Holmes

Tupou def. Holmes by unanimous decision (95-94, 96-93, 95-94)

- Middleweight bout (United States) Boyd Melson vs. (United States) Danny Lugo

Melson def. Lugo by TKO 2:01 of round 3

== International broadcasting ==
Country	Broadcaster
Australia	Main Event
Canada	Super Channel
Denmark	TV2
Estonia	Viasat Sport Baltic
France	Ma Chaîne Sport
Hungary	Sport 2
Latvia	Viasat Sport Baltic
Lithuania	Viasat Sport Baltic
Norway	Viasat Sport
Philippines	AKTV
Poland	Polsat Sport Extra
Romania	Digi Sport
Russia	NTV Plus Sport
Serbia	Arena Sport
South Africa	SuperSport
Sweden	TV10
United Kingdom	Sky Sports
United States	Showtime

Preceded by vs. Arthur Abraham	Andre Ward's bouts 17 December 2011	Succeeded by vs. Chad Dawson
Preceded by vs. Glen Johnson	Carl Froch's bouts 17 December 2011	Succeeded by vs. Lucian Bute
