= Jermain Taylor =

American boxer (born 1978)

Personal information
- Nickname: Bad Intentions
- Born: August 11, 1978 (age 48) Little Rock, Arkansas, U.S.
- Height: 6 ft 2 in (188 cm)
- Weight: Middleweight; Super middleweight

Boxing career
- Reach: 78 in (198 cm)
- Stance: Orthodox

Boxing record
- Total fights: 38
- Wins: 33
- Win by KO: 20
- Losses: 4
- Draws: 1
Medal record
Men's amateur boxing
Representing United States
Olympic Games
Bronze medal – third place	2000 Sydney	Light middleweight
Goodwill Games
Bronze medal – third place	1998 New York	Light middleweight

Jermain Taylor (born August 11, 1978) is an American former professional boxer who competed from 2001 to 2014. He remains the most recent undisputed champion (Note: Four-belt era: World Boxing Association (WBA) (Undisputed version), World Boxing Council (WBC), International Boxing Federation (IBF), and World Boxing Organization (WBO) titles.) in the middleweight division, having defeated Bernard Hopkins in 2005, and in doing so ending Hopkins' ten-year reign as middleweight champion. This made Taylor the first male boxer in history to claim each title from all four major boxing sanctioning organizations in a single fight. He defeated Hopkins in a rematch six months later, making him the only boxer to have defeated Hopkins twice. Taylor retired as a world champion in the months that followed his capture of the International Boxing Federation (IBF) middleweight title for a second time in 2014, after making a substantial recovery from a brain injury sustained earlier in his career.

He made his professional debut in 2001 and won his first 25 bouts, which included victories over former champions Raúl Márquez and William Joppy. Taylor, who began boxing officially at age 13, earned numerous accolades throughout his amateur career, starting with his achievement of the 1996 Under-19 Championship. He went on to win a pair of Police Athletic League (PAL) Championships and National Golden Gloves titles and he finished second and third at the 1997 and 1998 United States Championships, respectively. In 1998, Taylor won a bronze medal at the Goodwill Games. Then, in 2000, he earned a spot on the U.S. Olympic boxing team, becoming the first ever boxer from Arkansas to compete in the Olympic Games. At the 2000 Olympics, Taylor won a bronze medal in the light middleweight division.

During his reign as unified middleweight champion, Taylor won an immediate rematch against Hopkins and defeated Kassim Ouma and Cory Spinks, as well as fighting Winky Wright to a draw. Having vacated the World Boxing Council (WBC) and IBF titles, he lost the remainder of the unified and lineal middleweight championship to Kelly Pavlik in 2007, in what was his first professional defeat. A move up to super middleweight for a rematch against Pavlik the following year was also unsuccessful. In 2009, Taylor challenged Carl Froch for the WBC super middleweight title, but was stopped with seconds remaining in the final round. At the end of the year he participated in the Super Six World Boxing Classic tournament, but was again knocked out in the closing seconds of the final round by Arthur Abraham.

Subsequent neurological issues forced Taylor out of the ring for the next two years. He returned in 2011, winning five consecutive fights and defeating Sam Soliman in 2014 to claim his second IBF middleweight title. Later that year, Taylor was arrested and detained on gun charges but avoided a prison sentence in 2016.

== Professional career ==
=== Early fights ===
In December 2000, Taylor signed with boxing promoter Lou DiBella. Pat Burns became Taylor's trainer as a professional and Ozell Nelson became an assistant. He made his professional boxing debut on January 27, 2001, at Madison Square Garden in New York City against Chris Walsh. Taylor managed to knock Walsh down twice with his right hand and won his debut after forcing a stoppage with 16 seconds left in the fourth and final round. He went on to fight six more times in 2001, resulting in six more victories. Taylor continued his winning streak through 2002 and 2003, before defeating Alex Bunema on March 27, 2004. Taylor's next bout occurred on June 19, 2004 against former IBF Light Middleweight Champion Raúl Márquez. Taylor controlled the fight by using his jab and right hand throughout the one-sided contest. Near the end of the ninth round, Taylor landed a right uppercut that staggered Márquez. A follow-up right hand put Márquez down just before the bell rung to end the round. Soon after Márquez arrived to his corner, his trainer told the referee to stop the fight, resulting in a technical knockout victory for Taylor. On December 4, 2004, Taylor fought former WBA Middleweight Champion William Joppy in his hometown of Little Rock. For the majority of the fight, Joppy made the more aggressive Taylor chase him, while landing few punches and seeming more content to frustrate Taylor. Taylor landed several punches early in the fight and knocked Joppy down in the fifth round en route to a unanimous decision victory with scores of 120–107 from all three judges. In his next bout, Taylor fought Daniel Edouard on February 19, 2005. In the third round, Taylor landed a 10-punch combination that hurt Edouard to the point that the referee decided to stop the fight.

=== Undisputed middleweight champion ===
Taylor fought Bernard Hopkins for the Undisputed Middleweight Championship on July 16, 2005 at the MGM Grand in Las Vegas, Nevada. At age 40, Hopkins entered the bout with a record 20 consecutive successful title defenses and had not lost a fight in 12 years. Hopkins entered the boxing match as a 3–2 favorite to win. Taylor was able to successfully use his jab to control the first two rounds of the fight, though neither fighter was taking any major risks. He tended to move forward, while Hopkins was patient and waited for openings in Taylor's defense. In round five, a clash of heads opened a cut on the top of Taylor's head. In the tenth round, Hopkins hurt Taylor with two right hands that made his legs wobble and forced him to clinch. Taylor won the bout by split decision with two judges scoring the fight 115–113 for Taylor and the other judge scoring it 116–112 for Hopkins. With the victory, Taylor became the new Undisputed Middleweight Champion, winning the WBC, WBO, IBF, WBA (Super), The Ring and Lineal Middleweight Championships. Hopkins appealed the decision, but was denied by the Nevada State Athletic Commission.

On December 3, 2005, Taylor defeated Hopkins by unanimous decision in a rematch at the Mandalay Bay Resort & Casino in Las Vegas. In order for the rematch to occur, Taylor vacated his IBF Middleweight title on October 11, 2005. Days before the fight, tensions rose after Hopkins mocked Taylor's speech impediment and called him a "phony champion." Taylor responded by bringing a doll with Hopkins' name on it to the final prefight press conference to suggest that he was a "crybaby." In a similar situation to the first fight, Hopkins started slowly and began pressuring Taylor in the later rounds. Hopkins ended the fight with a 101–60 advantage in power punches, while Taylor had success with his jab, outlanding Hopkins 64–29. All three judges scored the bout 115–113 for Taylor. After the fight, Taylor said that he would welcome a challenge against the winner of a fight between former Undisputed Light Middleweight Champion Winky Wright and Sam Soliman. On December 10, 2005, Wright defeated Soliman by unanimous decision to retain his number one position in the WBC and WBA Middleweight rankings and take over the number one spot in the IBF Middleweight rankings.

=== Unified middleweight champion ===
==== Taylor vs. Wright ====
On June 17, 2006, Taylor fought Winky Wright at the FedEx Forum in Memphis, Tennessee. The WBC had ordered Taylor and Wright to begin negotiating on the fight on December 12, 2005 and if the two sides could not agree, a purse bid would be ordered. An agreement was made 10 minutes before a purse bid was to take place. Ozell Nelson, unsatisfied with Taylor's progression between the first and second Hopkins fights, helped convince Taylor to replace Pat Burns with hall of fame trainer Emanuel Steward. Taylor received $3.75 million for the fight and Wright made $3.5 million. Wright only paid sanctioning fees for the WBC belt, while Taylor paid fees to the WBC and WBO. Taylor did not pay the fees to the WBA amid controversy of the organization removing him from their rankings after questions of whether Taylor followed all procedures for the WBA before his rematch with Hopkins. He was reinstated at the top the organizations' middleweight rankings, but his title remained under review. The bout was evenly competitive through the first 10 rounds, with Wright winning most of the early rounds before Taylor became more active in the latter part of the fight. By the ninth round, Wright had swelling above both his eyes. Wright was winning the bout going into the final round on two of the judges' scorecards, but he was generally passive in the round. Two of the three judges gave the round to Taylor, which resulted in a draw. The scores for the fight were 115–113 for Taylor, 115–113 for Wright and 114–114.

==== Taylor vs. Ouma, Spinks ====
On December 9, 2006, Taylor fought Kassim Ouma at the Alltel Arena in North Little Rock, Arkansas. Taylor hurt Ouma early in the first round and continued to control the fight through the middle part of the fight with jabs and hooks. During the second half of the fight, Taylor gradually began to tire and suffered a cut over the left eye. He allowed Ouma to back him into the ropes often as the fight came to an end. However, Ouma was unable to be effective with his punches. Taylor won the bout by unanimous decision with scores of 117–111, 115–113 and 118–110. Afterwards, the WBA announced that Taylor was no longer the holder of its Middleweight Super Championship. On May 19, 2007, Taylor went up against former Undisputed Welterweight Champion Cory Spinks at the FedEx Forum in Memphis. Taylor dictated the fight by staying away from Spinks and landing one punch at a time. He hurt Spinks with a right hand in the seventh round. Spinks, with a much shorter reach, had difficulty getting within a closer range against his opponent. Taylor landed 101 of 319 punches, while Spinks landed just 85 of 542. Taylor won the fight by split decision, with two judges scoring 117–111 and 115–113 in favor of him and the other scoring 117–111 for Spinks.

==== Taylor vs. Pavlik ====
In his next bout, Taylor fought Kelly Pavlik on September 29, 2007 at Boardwalk Hall in Atlantic City, New Jersey. Pavlik began rising in popularity after an upset victory over Edison Miranda in a Middleweight Title Eliminator to determine the number one contender to fight Taylor. During their amateur careers, Taylor had defeated Pavlik on February 9, 2000 in the opening round of the United States Olympic trials. In the second round of the bout, Taylor landed a right hand and followed-up with several more punches which resulted in the first knockdown of the fight. Pavlik got up and managed to make it to the end of the round. Entering the seventh round, Taylor had a commanding lead on all three judges' scorecards. With less than a minute remaining in the round, Pavlik landed a right cross that sent Taylor into a corner. Pavlik closed in and threw a left uppercut followed by a left and right hook and right uppercut. Two more left hooks dropped Taylor to the canvas as the referee stepped in to halt the fight. It was the first time Taylor had lost in his professional career and the first time he had ever been knocked down. One month later, Taylor exercised a rematch clause in his contract with Pavlik. The rematch took place at a weight of 166 pounds (75 kg), six pounds higher than the middleweight limit. Due to disappointing performances, Emanuel Steward was fired as Taylor's trainer and replaced with Ozell Nelson. Fighting at the MGM Grand in Las Vegas on February 16, 2008, Taylor lost the rematch to Pavlik by unanimous decision.

=== Super middleweight ===
After the two losses to Pavlik, Taylor moved up officially to the super middleweight division. On November 15, 2008, Taylor defeated Jeff Lacy by a dominant unanimous decision to earn a mandatory fight against the winner of a bout between Carl Froch and Jean Pascal for the vacant WBC Super Middleweight title, a fight that was won by Froch. On April 25, 2009, at the Foxwoods Resort Casino in Ledyard, Connecticut, Taylor fought Carl Froch for the WBC Super Middleweight title. Taylor was able to control the first two rounds of the fight. In the third round, Taylor knocked Froch down for the first time in his career with a right hand. Entering the final round, Taylor was ahead 106–102 on two of the judges' scorecards, while Froch was ahead 106–102 on the other. During the round, Froch landed two right hands that sent Taylor to the canvas. He got up, but Froch quickly went after him, trapping him against the ropes and landing a barrage of hard and fast punches. Taylor could not recoup or defend himself, desperately curling up against the ropes. Around 10 clean hard shots from Froch landed before the referee stepped in to stop the bout with only a matter of seconds left in the final round, earning Froch the technical knockout victory.

=== Super Six tournament and first retirement ===
Taylor competed in the preliminary round of the Super Six World Boxing Classic, a tournament by Showtime, to find out who is the best boxer in the super middleweight division.

On October 17, 2009, in his first fight in the Super Six tournament at the O2 World Arena in Berlin, Germany, undefeated Armenian-German former champion, Arthur Abraham, defeated Jermain Taylor by KO in the 12th round with less than 10 seconds left in the fight. Taylor was hospitalized with a severe concussion, suffering short term memory loss, unable to remember details of this bout. After being released from the hospital, Taylor released a statement saying that he's doing just fine and wanted to congratulate Abraham on his victory and wish him well in the tournament. At the time of the stoppage, the judges scorecards read: 104-102, 107-102 and 106-102, all in favour of Abraham.

In January 2010, Taylor, one of the original members of the Super Six World Boxing Classic, officially withdrew from the tournament. The former Undisputed Middleweight Champion issued a statement in early 2010 saying, "I'm going to take some time off from the sport of boxing and take myself out of the SHOWTIME Sports World Boxing Classic tournament. It's important that I give my body and mind some much needed rest, because I have been boxing for nearly 20 years," said Taylor. "I plan on keeping myself in shape and making a return to the sport sometime in the future. This was not an easy decision for me, having discussed it with my family, trainer, friends and my adviser Al Haymon, because I'm a very competitive person-but I know this is the smart road for me to take." Taylor was later replaced by Allan Green.

=== Middleweight comeback ===
On December 30, 2011, after 26 months away from the ring, Taylor finally returned and faced Jessie Nicklow. In a fight scheduled for ten rounds, Taylor won via technical knockout in the eighth round. He then took on then-undefeated Caleb Truax (18-0-1) on April 25, 2012 in another fight scheduled for ten rounds. Taylor controlled most of the action and survived a knock-down in round nine in order to win a unanimous decision victory.

Taylor then faced boxing veteran Raul Munoz on October 12, 2012. He made short work of Muñoz, winning via second-round KO.

Taylor's next bout was against Juan Carlos Candelo on December 14, 2013. Jermaine won with a seventh-round TKO.

On October 4, 2014, Taylor fought Sam Soliman, in Biloxi, Mississippi for Soliman's IBF Middleweight World Championship belt. After twelve grueling rounds, (Soliman injured his knee badly midway through the fight) and knocking Soliman down four times (Soliman actually went down on his own from the knee injury, not primarily from punches from Taylor), Taylor won with a resounding unanimous decision. By regaining the belt he had lost to Pavlik in 2007, Taylor became a two-time middleweight world champion.

=== Troubles outside the ring and second retirement ===
On February 6, 2015 Taylor was scheduled to defend his title against Sergio Mora on ESPN2's Friday Night Fights in Biloxi, Mississippi. However, the fight was cancelled after Taylor suffered an injury and was also later arrested and charged with multiple felonies following an incident on January 19 (see Personal life below). The IBF subsequently stripped him of his title on February 6, due to his inability to defend during his ongoing legal and mental health issues.

== Personal life ==
Taylor was married to former Louisiana Tech University basketball player Erica Taylor, who was selected in the second round of the 2005 WNBA draft by the Washington Mystics. Jermain and Erica Taylor have three daughters. Jermaine has a son also Jermain Taylor JR. Taylor gained popularity in the state for frequently mentioning how proud he was to be from Arkansas. He is known to be an enthusiastic fan of the University of Arkansas Razorbacks and has visited the Arkansas campus to talk to the football team. Taylor often sports a large Razorback on the back of his boxing robe and trunks for his fights. He was named "Arkansan of the Year" for 2005 by the Arkansas Times. In 2007, Taylor was inducted into the Arkansas Sports Hall of Fame along with former NFL players Rod Smith and Willie Roaf. Taylor has modeled for Everlast, GQ and Vogue.

Lou Dibella resigned as Taylor's promoter because he was concerned with Taylor's health following the knockout from Arthur Abraham in the Super Six tournament. Taylor had been knocked out two times prior to the Abraham bout.

On August 26, 2014, Taylor was taken into police custody and charged with two felonies after officers said he shot his cousin during an altercation in his Little Rock, Arkansas, home. Taylor was out on bond for his October 4, 2014, bout versus Sam Soliman. On January 19, 2015, Taylor was arrested without incident and a gun was recovered. He was jailed on five felony counts of aggravated assault, three felony counts of endangering the welfare of a minor, and a misdemeanor count of drug possession after he was found to have a small bag of marijuana. Taylor was remanded to the custody of the Pulaski County Regional Detention Facility in Little Rock in lieu of a $27,000 bond.

On May 20, 2016, Taylor was given a suspended sentence of 19 years to be served concurrently, amounting to a six-year suspended sentence for three cases. He was also sentenced to probation and will have to serve 120 hours of community service, pay a $2,000 fine plus court costs, and will have to submit to regular drug screens.

== Professional boxing record ==
38 fights	33 wins	4 losses
By knockout	20	3
By decision	13	1
Draws	1	

No.	Result	Record	Opponent	Type	Round, time	Date	Location	Notes
38	Win	33–4–1	Sam Soliman	UD	12	Oct 4, 2014	Beau Rivage, Biloxi, Mississippi, U.S.	Won IBF middleweight title
37	Win	32–4–1	Juan Carlos Candelo	TKO	7 (10), 2:58	Dec 14, 2013	Alamodome, San Antonio, Texas, U.S.	
36	Win	31–4–1	Raúl Jorge Muñoz	KO	2 (10), 1:05	Oct 12, 2012	Ameristar Casino Resort Spa, St. Charles, Missouri, U.S.	
35	Win	30–4–1	Caleb Truax	UD	10	Apr 25, 2012	Beau Rivage, Biloxi, Mississippi, U.S.	
34	Win	29–4–1	Jessie Nicklow	TKO	8 (10), 0:36	Dec 30, 2011	Morongo Casino Resort & Spa, Cabazon, California, U.S.	
33	Loss	28–4–1	Arthur Abraham	KO	12 (12), 2:54	Oct 17, 2009	O2 World, Berlin, Germany	Super Six World Boxing Classic: group stage 1
32	Loss	28–3–1	Carl Froch	TKO	12 (12), 2:46	Apr 25, 2009	Foxwoods Resort Casino, Ledyard, Connecticut, U.S.	For WBC super middleweight title
31	Win	28–2–1	Jeff Lacy	UD	12	Nov 15, 2008	Memorial Gymnasium, Nashville, Tennessee, U.S.	
30	Loss	27–2–1	Kelly Pavlik	UD	12	Feb 16, 2008	MGM Grand Garden Arena, Paradise, Nevada, U.S.	
29	Loss	27–1–1	Kelly Pavlik	TKO	7 (12), 2:14	Sep 29, 2007	Boardwalk Hall, Atlantic City, New Jersey, U.S.	Lost WBC, WBO and The Ring middleweight titles
28	Win	27–0–1	Cory Spinks	SD	12	May 19, 2007	FedExForum, Memphis, Tennessee, U.S.	Retained WBC, WBO and The Ring middleweight titles
27	Win	26–0–1	Kassim Ouma	UD	12	Dec 9, 2006	Alltel Arena, Little Rock, Arkansas, U.S.	Retained WBC, WBO and The Ring middleweight titles
26	Draw	25–0–1	Winky Wright	SD	12	Jun 17, 2006	FedExForum, Memphis, Tennessee, U.S.	Retained WBC, WBO and The Ring middleweight titles
25	Win	25–0	Bernard Hopkins	UD	12	Dec 3, 2005	Mandalay Bay Events Center, Paradise, Nevada, U.S.	Retained WBA (Undisputed), WBC, WBO and The Ring middleweight titles
24	Win	24–0	Bernard Hopkins	SD	12	Jul 16, 2005	MGM Grand Garden Arena, Paradise, Nevada, U.S.	Won WBA (Undisputed), WBC, IBF, WBO and The Ring middleweight titles
23	Win	23–0	Daniel Edouard	TKO	3 (10), 2:26	Feb 19, 2005	Staples Center, Los Angeles, California, U.S.	
22	Win	22–0	William Joppy	UD	12	Dec 4, 2004	Barton Coliseum, Little Rock, Arkansas, U.S.	Retained WBC Continental Americas middleweight title
21	Win	21–0	Raúl Márquez	RTD	9 (12), 3:00	Jun 19, 2004	Home Depot Center, Carson, California, U.S.	Retained WBC Continental Americas middleweight title
20	Win	20–0	Alex Bunema	TKO	7 (12), 2:17	Mar 27, 2004	Alltel Arena, Little Rock, Arkansas, U.S.	Retained WBC Continental Americas middleweight title
19	Win	19–0	Alex Rios	TKO	1 (10), 0:54	Jan 9, 2004	Mohegan Sun Arena, Montville, Connecticut, U.S.	
18	Win	18–0	Rogelio Martinez	TKO	7 (10), 1:42	Nov 8, 2003	Mandalay Bay Events Center, Paradise, Nevada, U.S.	
17	Win	17–0	Alfredo Cuevas	UD	12	Aug 8, 2003	Alltel Arena, Little Rock, Arkansas, U.S.	Won vacant WBC Continental Americas middleweight title
16	Win	16–0	Nicolas Cervera	TKO	4 (10), 2:37	May 17, 2003	Petersen Events Center, Pittsburgh, Pennsylvania, U.S.	
15	Win	15–0	Marcos Primera	TKO	5 (10), 2:12	Mar 31, 2003	Statehouse Convention Center, Little Rock, Arkansas, U.S.	
14	Win	14–0	Lionel Ortiz	TKO	2 (10), 0:40	Jan 30, 2003	American Airlines Arena, Miami, Florida, U.S.	
13	Win	13–0	Keith Sims	TKO	1 (10), 0:52	Dec 20, 2002	Creek Nation Gaming Center, Tulsa, Oklahoma, U.S.	
12	Win	12–0	Johnny Rivera	TKO	4 (10), 2:23	Nov 9, 2002	Mountaineer Casino Racetrack and Resort, Chester, West Virginia, U.S.	
11	Win	11–0	Sam Hill	UD	10	Aug 17, 2002	Etess Arena, Atlantic City, New Jersey, U.S.	
10	Win	10–0	Grady Brewer	UD	8	Jun 15, 2002	Miccosukee Resort & Gaming, Miami, Florida, U.S.	
9	Win	9–0	Joe Garcia	TKO	6 (8)	Apr 27, 2002	Madison Square Garden, New York City, New York, U.S.	
8	Win	8–0	Ron Carnell	TKO	3 (6), 0:16	Mar 15, 2002	Creek Nation Bingo, Tulsa, Oklahoma, U.S.	
7	Win	7–0	Undra White	TKO	4 (6), 0:17	Nov 23, 2001	Roseland Ballroom, New York City, New York, U.S.	
6	Win	6–0	Dave Hamilton	TKO	2 (6), 1:54	Nov 2, 2001	Foxwoods Resort Casino, Ledyard, Connecticut, U.S.	
5	Win	5–0	Efrain Garcia	TKO	5 (6), 1:25	Aug 11, 2001	Alltel Arena, Little Rock, Arkansas, U.S.	
4	Win	4–0	Marvin Smith	UD	4	Jun 23, 2001	MGM Grand Garden Arena, Paradise, Nevada, U.S.	
3	Win	3–0	Antonio Baker	UD	4	May 8, 2001	IC Light Amphitheatre, Pittsburgh, Pennsylvania, U.S.	
2	Win	2–0	Kenny Stubbs	TKO	2 (4), 2:28	Apr 7, 2001	MGM Grand Garden Arena, Paradise, Nevada, U.S.	
1	Win	1–0	Chris Walsh	TKO	4 (4), 0:16	Jan 27, 2001	Madison Square Garden, New York City, New York, U.S.	

== Titles in boxing ==
=== Major world titles ===
- WBA (Undisputed) middleweight champion (160 lbs)
- WBC middleweight champion (160 lbs)
- IBF middleweight champion (160 lbs) (2×)
- WBO middleweight champion (160 lbs)

=== The Ring magazine titles ===
- The Ring middleweight champion (160 lbs)

=== Regional/International titles ===
- WBC Continental Americas middleweight champion (160 lbs)

=== Undisputed titles ===
- Undisputed middleweight champion

=== Honorary titles ===
- WBO Super Champion

== See also ==
- List of middleweight boxing champions
- List of WBA world champions
- List of WBC world champions
- List of IBF world champions
- List of WBO world champions
- List of The Ring world champions
- List of undisputed boxing champions

== Notes ==
Sporting positions
Amateur boxing titles
Previous: Cleveland Corder	U.S. Golden Gloves light middleweight champion 1998, 1999	Next: Sechew Powell
Regional boxing titles
Vacant Title last held by Julio Garcia	WBC Continental Americas middleweight champion August 8, 2003 – February 2005; Vacated	Vacant Title next held by John Duddy
World boxing titles
Preceded by Bernard Hopkins	WBA middleweight champion Undisputed title July 16, 2005 – December 14, 2006; Stripped	Vacant Title next held by Felix Sturm as Super champion
Preceded by Bernard Hopkins	WBC middleweight champion July 16, 2005 – September 29, 2007	Succeeded by Kelly Pavlik
Preceded by Bernard Hopkins	IBF middleweight champion July 16, 2005 – October 11, 2005; Stripped	Vacant Title next held by Arthur Abraham
Preceded by Bernard Hopkins	WBO middleweight champion July 16, 2005 – September 29, 2007	Succeeded by Kelly Pavlik
Preceded by Bernard Hopkins	The Ring middleweight champion July 16, 2005 – September 29, 2007	Succeeded by Kelly Pavlik
Preceded by Bernard Hopkins	Undisputed middleweight champion July 16, 2005 – October 11, 2005; Titles fragmented	Vacant
Preceded by Bernard Hopkins	Lineal middleweight champion July 16, 2005 – September 29, 2007	Succeeded by Kelly Pavlik
Preceded by Sam Soliman	IBF middleweight champion October 4, 2014 – February 6, 2015; Stripped	Vacant Title next held by David Lemieux
Awards
Previous: Somsak Sithchatchawal vs. Mahyar Monshipour	BWAA Fight of the Year vs. Kelly Pavlik; 2007	Next: Israel Vázquez vs. Rafael Márquez III
