= List of Armenian boxers =

This is a list of Armenian boxers.

- William Abelyan
- Alexander Abraham
- Arthur Abraham
- Araik Ambartsumov
- Alexander Awdijan
- David Ayrapetyan
- Hovhannes Danielyan
- Vic Darchinyan
- Khoren Gevor
- Artur Gevorgyan
- Mekhak Ghazaryan
- Artur Grigorian
- Andranik Hakobyan
- Eduard Hambardzumyan
- Artyom Hovanessyan
- Hrachik Javakhyan
- Susianna Kentikian
- Leva Kirakosyan
- Kirkor Kirkorov
- Tom Bradbury
- David Lemieux
- Artak Malumyan
- Arsen Martirosian
- Vanes Martirosyan
- Nshan Munchyan
- Karo Murat
- Victor Oganov
- Bagrat Oghanian
- Lernik Papyan
- Aram Ramazyan
- Vazgen Safaryants
- David Torosyan
- Vladimir Yengibaryan
- Nshan Nalchadzhyan
