= Amin Asikainen =

Finnish boxer

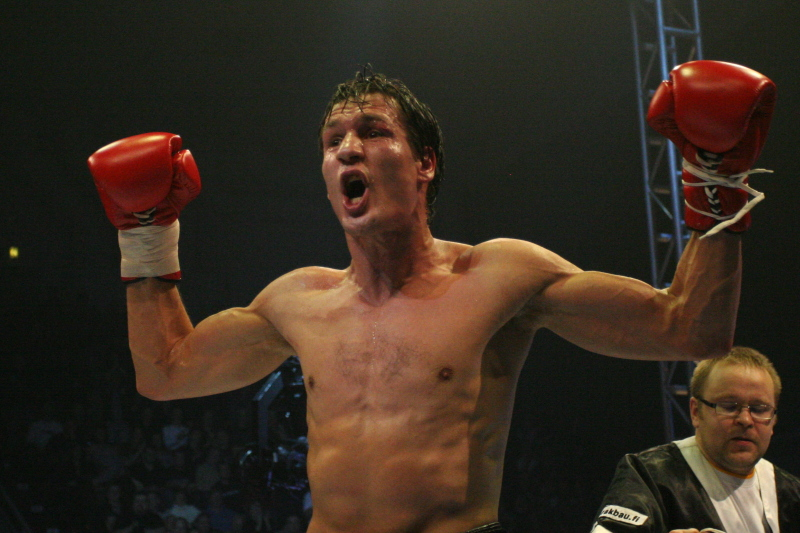
- Asikainen in 2008

Personal information
- Nickname: Idi
- Nationality: Finnish
- Born: 21 January 1976 (age 50) Kirkkonummi, Finland
- Height: 1.80 m (5 ft 11 in)
- Weight: Middleweight

Boxing career
- Stance: Orthodox

Boxing record
- Total fights: 33
- Wins: 29
- Win by KO: 19
- Losses: 4

Amin Asikainen (born 21 January 1976) is a Finnish former professional boxer who competed from 2001 to 2011, and in 2016. He held the European and European Union middleweight titles between 2006 and 2007, and the Finnish middleweight title in 2003. His nickname of "Idi" refers to the similarity of his first name to that of Idi Amin.

== Early life ==
Amin was born in 1976 to a Moroccan father and a Finnish mother. At the age of six, he started playing football and training karate and taekwondo when he was around age of nine, but abandoned the sports in favor of boxing when he was twelve. A childhood friend of his, Joni Turunen, also became a successful amateur boxer.

== Amateur boxing ==
Asikainen has fought a total of 175 amateur matches, winning 135 of them. He was the Finnish champion in 1996, 1998 and 1999, and also won in Tammer-, GeeBee-, Copenhagen Box Open- and Karl Leman tournaments.

== Professional career ==
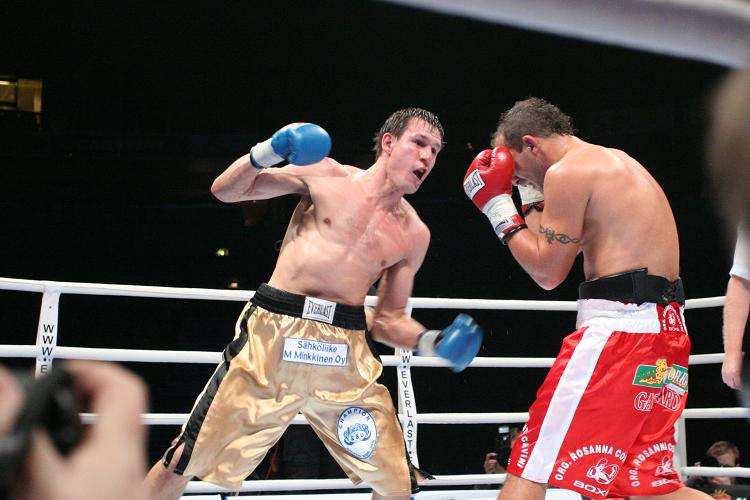
Asikainen versus Lorenzo Di Giacomo in Helsinki, Finland (2007)

Asikainen won his first professional title in 2003, beating Kai Kauramaki to win the Finnish middleweight title.

Asikainen later won the EBU-EU middleweight championship on 5 May 2006 after beating the Frenchman Christophe Tendil by a knockout in the fifth round. After beating Sebastian Sylvester, a German, on 3 June 2006, Asikainen became the EBU Middleweight Champion.

Asikainen defended the title twice, first against Alexander Sipos on 6 October 2006, and then against Lorenzo Di Giacomo on 30 January 2007.

Sylvester regained the European middleweight title with TKO-victory in June 2007 in Zwickau, Germany.

In March 2007, Asikainen had been contracted to fight a rematch against Germany's Sebastian Sylvester for the European title, however, Asikainen pulled out due to injury and Sylvester faced Italian Alessio Furlan instead. The rematch between Asikainen and Sylvester took place in June 2007. Sylvester knocked Asikainen down twice in the eleventh round before the fight was stopped by the referee.

In 2011 in Helsinki Amin Asikainen lost to Piotr Wilczewski by TKO in the eleventh round, retiring from the sport soon after.

On 22 April 2016, 40 years old Asikainen returned to the ring for a single match beating Ivan Jukic with points.

== Professional boxing record ==
33 fights	29 wins	4 losses
By knockout	19	4
By decision	10	0

No.	Result	Record	Opponent	Type	Round, time	Date	Location	Notes
34	Win	–	Timo Laine	UD		27 Sep 2025	Ice Hall, Helsinki, Finland	
33	Win	29–4	Ivan Jukic	UD	6	22 Apr 2016	Vesileppis Areena, Leppävirta, Finland	
32	Loss	28–4	Piotr Wilczewski	TKO	11 (12), 1:24	3 Mar 2011	Hartwall Arena, Helsinki, Finland	For vacant European and WBO Inter-Continental super-middleweight titles
31	Win	28–3	Jaudiel Zepeda	TKO	4 (8), 0:53	4 Sep 2010	Töölö Sports Hall, Helsinki, Finland	
30	Win	27–3	Dario Armando Matorras	TKO	4 (6), 2:23	11 May 2010	Varuboden Areena, Kirkkonummi, Finland	
29	Loss	26–3	Matthew Macklin	TKO	1 (12), 2:34	25 Sep 2009	Manchester Velodrome, Manchester, England	For vacant European middleweight title
28	Win	26–2	Antonio Valentin Ochoa	UD	8	18 Apr 2009	Töölö Sports Hall, Helsinki, Finland	
27	Loss	25–2	Khoren Gevor	TKO	7 (12)	28 Nov 2008	Hartwall Arena, Helsinki, Finland	For vacant European middleweight title
26	Win	25–1	Roberto Oliveira de Jesus	KO	2 (8), 1:08	30 Aug 2008	Metroauto-areena, Tampere, Finland	
25	Win	24–1	Yori Boy Campas	TKO	7 (10), 0:56	1 Feb 2008	Töölö Sports Hall, Helsinki, Finland	
24	Win	23–1	Christophe Karagoz	UD	10	22 Oct 2007	Töölö Sports Hall, Helsinki, Finland	
23	Win	22–1	Sylvain Touzet	UD	4	28 Sep 2007	Kungliga tennishallen, Stockholm, Sweden	
22	Loss	21–1	Sebastian Sylvester	TKO	11 (12)	23 Jun 2007	Stadthalle, Zwickau, Germany	Lost European middleweight title
21	Win	21–0	Martins Kukulis	TKO	6 (8), 1:26	18 May 2007	Urheilutalo, Helsinki, Finland	
20	Win	20–0	Lorenzo Di Giacomo	UD	12	30 Jan 2007	Hartwall Arena, Helsinki, Finland	Retained European middleweight title
19	Win	19–0	Alexander Sipos	UD	12	6 Oct 2006	Hartwall Arena, Helsinki, Finland	Retained European middleweight title
18	Win	18–0	Sebastian Sylvester	TKO	8 (12), 2:48	3 Jun 2006	TUI Arena, Hanover, Germany	Won European middleweight title
17	Win	17–0	Christophe Tendil	KO	5 (10), 2:31	5 May 2006	Töölö Sports Hall, Helsinki, Finland	Won vacant European Union middleweight title
16	Win	16–0	Walter Fabian Saporiti	TKO	6 (10), 0:01	16 Jan 2006	Töölö Sports Hall, Helsinki, Finland	
15	Win	15–0	Tagir Rzaev	UD	6	30 Sep 2005	Studio 51, Helsinki, Finland	
14	Win	14–0	Mugurel Sebe	UD	6	18 Jun 2005	Porvoo, Finland	
13	Win	13–0	Viachaslau Syrovatka	KO	2 (6), 1:27	4 Apr 2005	Töölö Sports Hall, Helsinki, Finland	
12	Win	12–0	Szabolcs Rimovszky	KO	2 (8), 0:36	19 Mar 2005	Premi Nightclub, Helsinki, Finland	
11	Win	11–0	Petko Marinov	TKO	4 (6)	22 Nov 2004	Helsinki, Finland	
10	Win	10–0	Jurijs Boreiko	TKO	2 (6)	4 Sep 2004	Levi, Kittilä, Finland	
9	Win	9–0	Tomas Kugler	KO	6 (8)	16 Jul 2004	Helsinki, Finland	
8	Win	8–0	Dmitri Protkunas	KO	2 (6)	17 Apr 2004	Baltic Hall, Mariehamn, Finland	
7	Win	7–0	Emil Rusev	PTS	6	13 Mar 2004	Palma, Spain	
6	Win	6–0	Gyorgy Bugyik	TKO	2 (6), 1:40	13 Dec 2003	Aladdin Bar & Night Club, Espoo, Finland	
5	Win	5–0	Leonti Vorontsuk	KO	2 (6)	17 May 2003	Jatuli, Haukipudas, Finland	
4	Win	4–0	Kai Kauramäki	UD	10	15 Feb 2003	Töölö Sports Hall, Helsinki, Finland	Won vacant Finnish middleweight title
3	Win	3–0	Roman Divisek	KO	1 (4)	13 Sep 2002	Keskustan väestonsuoja, Kirkkonummi, Finland	
2	Win	2–0	Aleksandr Olimpijev	TKO	2 (4)	7 Feb 2002	Keskustan väestonsuoja, Kirkkonummi, Finland	
1	Win	1–0	Istvan Mohacsy	TKO	1 (4)	10 Dec 2001	Ice Hall, Helsinki, Finland	Professional debut

== Other ==
Asikainen is featured in the 2009 sports game Fight Night Round 4.

Sporting positions
Regional boxing titles
New title	Finnish middleweight champion 15 Feb 2003 – 2011; Vacated	Vacant Title next held by Timo Laine
Vacant Title last held by Lorenzo Di Giacomo	European Union middleweight champion 5 May 2006 – 3 June 2006; Won full European title	Vacant Title next held by Mahir Oral
Preceded by Sebastian Sylvester	European middleweight champion 3 June 2006 – 23 June 2007	Succeeded by Sebastian Sylvester
