= Elvin Ayala =

American boxer (born 1981)

Personal information
- Nickname: The Lycan
- Born: January 15, 1981 (age 45) Reading, Pennsylvania, U.S.
- Height: 5 ft 11 in (180 cm)
- Weight: Middleweight

Boxing career
- Reach: 74 in (188 cm)
- Stance: Orthodox

Boxing record
- Total fights: 43
- Wins: 29
- Win by KO: 13
- Losses: 13
- Draws: 1

Elvin Ayala (born January 15, 1981) is an American professional boxer. He is a former world-title challenger.

== Early life ==
Born in Reading, Pennsylvania, but raised in New Haven, Connecticut, Ayala took up boxing as a way to stay off the streets and out of trouble. He credits former light heavyweight world champion Chad Dawson as one of his early influences.

"I really didn’t have any schooling," Ayala said, "and there were drugs everywhere I grew up. When I came to Connecticut, Chad was coming up at the time and becoming a star and making money, and I’m like, 'Wait, you can make money off this?'

"I didn’t want to live a life where I had to look over my shoulder all the time, but I still needed to make money. I didn’t want to live in poverty anymore."

== Professional career ==
At the age of 22, Ayala made his professional debut on September 19, 2003, with a unanimous decision win over Michael Gutrick in Toms River, New Jersey, a short distance from his hometown of Reading, Pennsylvania.

Within a year, Ayala improved his professional record to 7–0 with one knockout. On November 11, 2004, Ayala earned his eighth professional win by knocking out Chance Leggett, then 11–3, in the seventh round of a scheduled eight-round bout at The Roxy in Boston, Massachusetts. The victory over Leggett began a stretch of three consecutive knockout wins for Ayala.

Ayala eventually won his first 16 fights before facing his toughest test to date against future The Contender reality television participant David Banks, who was 12-1-1 at the time, on November 24, 2006, at The Roxy. Ayala lost a narrow split decision, 94–97, 95–96, 96-94 — the first loss of his professional career. Three months later, Ayala faced Banks again, this time losing by unanimous decision, 91–99, 93–97, 94–96, at Mohegan Sun in February 2007.

Ayala bounced back with back-to-back wins against Dillon Carew and Jose Angel Roman in Connecticut and closed the year with arguably his most impressive performance in a controversial draw against then-unbeaten The Contender Season 1 champion Sergio Mora at the Home Depot Center in Carson, California. Ayala lost, 91–99, on judge David Mendoza's scorecard, but won the bout, 96–94, on Raul Caiz Jr.'s scorecard. Max DeLuca judged the bout even at 95-95.

The draw dropped Ayala's record to 18-2-1, setting up the biggest fight of Ayala's young career — a showdown against undefeated International Boxing Federation (IBF) middleweight world champion Arthur Abraham. The bout took place on March 29, 2008, in Germany two months after Ayala's 27th birthday. Abraham won the majority of the rounds, sending Ayala to the canvas in the fifth, and finished Ayala for good via 12th-round knockout with just 28 seconds remaining in the fight. Abraham improved to 26–0 with the win, which was also his seventh world-title defense.

Following a 10-month stretch of inactivity, Ayala returned with back-to-back wins against Antony Bartinelli and Eddie Caminero before losing a United States Boxing Association (USBA) middleweight title bout against former world-title challenger Lajuan Simon by unanimous decision at the Palms Casino Resort.

Ayala then traveled to Montreal, Quebec in June 2010 to face hometown favorite David Lemieux, who entered the bout at 22–0 with 21 knockouts, on ESPN's Friday Night Fights for the WBC International middleweight title. Ayala hit the canvas three times in the opening round and lost by technical knockout at the 2:44 mark. "There were so many excuses after the loss [to Lemieux]. Everyone had all these reasons," Ayala said. “I felt the only reason was because I was too heavy and had to lose the weight rapidly. I was drained. Who can fight like that? My four-year-old daughter could’ve hit me that day and knocked me out."

After his loss to Lemieux, Ayala stringed together six wins against lesser opposition and won the USNBC title along the way. Ayala would then lose a fight to Curtis Stevens for the NABF title via round 1 stoppage. Stevens overpowered Ayala, knocking him down twice in the first round.

Ayala won an upset unanimous decision (78-74, 78–74, 77–75) over Mayweather Promotions prospect Ronald Gavril. However, Ayala would lose his next fight to Sergiy Derevyanchenko by unanimous decision. In November 2016, Ayala defeated Marcos Reyes by round 7 TKO. This was Ayala's first stoppage win in over 4 years.

== Professional boxing record ==
43 fights	29 wins	13 losses
By knockout	13	5
By decision	16	8
Draws	1	

No.	Result	Record	Opponent	Type	Round, time	Date	Location	More
43	Loss	29–13–1	(Russia) Bakhram Murtazaliev	TKO	9 (10), 2:05	Feb 2, 2019	(United States) Ford Center at The Star, Frisco, Texas, U.S.	For WBC-USNBC light middleweight title
42	Loss	29–12–1	(United States) Patrick Day	UD	10	Oct 27, 2018	(United States) Hulu Theater, New York City, New York, U.S.	For WBC Continental Americas light middleweight title
41	Loss	29–11–1	(United States) Alantez Fox	UD	8	Sep 22, 2018	(United States) Bowie State University, Bowie, Maryland, U.S.	
40	Loss	29–10–1	(United States) Vaughn Alexander	TKO	7 (10), 1:42	Oct 5, 2017	(United States) Mohegan Sun Arena, Montville, Connecticut, U.S.	
39	Loss	29–9–1	(Dominican Republic) Junior Castillo	UD	12	Apr 27, 2017	(United States) Anatole Hotel, Dallas, Texas, U.S.	For vacant WBF middleweight title
38	Win	29–8–1	(Mexico) Marcos Reyes	TKO	7 (10), 1:43	Nov 3, 2016	(United States) Dallas Petroleum Club, Dallas, Texas, U.S.	Won vacant WBC-USNBC middleweight title
37	Loss	28–8–1	(United States) Christopher Brooker	MD	8	Sep 9, 2016	(United States) Santander Arena, Reading, Pennsylvania, U.S.	
36	Loss	28–7–1	(Ukraine) Sergiy Derevyanchenko	UD	8	Aug 7, 2015	(United States) Bally's Atlantic City, Atlantic City, New Jersey, U.S.	
35	Win	28–6–1	(Romania) Ronald Gavril	UD	8	Mar 28, 2015	(United States) Pearl Concert Theater, Paradise, Nevada, U.S.	
34	Win	27–6–1	(United States) Aaron Mitchell	UD	6	Jan 17, 2015	(United States) Mohegan Sun Arena, Montville, Connecticut, U.S.	
33	Loss	26–6–1	(United States) Curtis Stevens	KO	1 (10), 1:10	Jan 19, 2013	(United States) Mohegan Sun Arena, Montville, Connecticut, U.S.	For vacant NABF middleweight title
32	Win	26–5–1	(United States) John Mackey	TKO	9 (10), 0:53	Jul 21, 2012	(United States) Mohegan Sun Arena, Montville, Connecticut, U.S.	
31	Win	25–5–1	(United States) Eric Mitchell	UD	8	Mar 30, 2012	(United States) Foxwoods Resort Casino, Ledyard, Connecticut, U.S.	Retained WBC-USNBC middleweight title
30	Win	24–5–1	(United States) Derrick Findley	UD	10	Jul 29, 2011	(United States) Mohegan Sun Arena, Montville, Connecticut, U.S.	Won vacant WBC-USNBC middleweight title
29	Win	23–5–1	(United States) George Armenta	RTD	4 (8), 3:00	May 6, 2011	(United States) Foxwoods Resort Casino, Ledyard, Connecticut, U.S.	
28	Win	22–5–1	(United States) Joe Gardner	RTD	4 (6), 3:00	Apr 1, 2011	(United States) Foxwoods Resort Casino, Ledyard, Connecticut, U.S.	
27	Win	21–5–1	(United States) Mustafah Johnson	UD	6	Feb 4, 2011	(United States) Mohegan Sun Arena, Montville, Connecticut, U.S.	
26	Loss	20–5–1	(Canada) David Lemieux	KO	1 (12), 2:44	Jun 11, 2010	Uniprix Stadium, Montreal, Quebec, Canada	For vacant WBC International middleweight title
25	Loss	20–4–1	(United States) Lajuan Simon	UD	12	Oct 17, 2009	(United States) Pearl Concert Theater, Paradise, Nevada, U.S.	For IBF-USBA middleweight title
24	Win	20–3–1	(United States) Eddie Caminero	TKO	3 (6), 0:41	Jun 27, 2009	(United States) The Roxy, Boston, Massachusetts, U.S.	
23	Win	19–3–1	(United States) Anthony Bartinelli	UD	8	Jan 23, 2009	(United States) Plaza Hotel & Casino, Las Vegas, Nevada, U.S.	
22	Loss	18–3–1	(Germany) Arthur Abraham	KO	12 (12), 2:32	Mar 29, 2008	Ostseehalle, Kiel, Germany	For IBF middleweight title
21	Draw	18–2–1	(United States) Sergio Mora	SD	10	Oct 16, 2007	(United States) Home Depot Center, Carson, California, U.S.	
20	Win	18–2	(Puerto Rico) Jose Angel Roman	UD	8	Jun 29, 2007	(United States) Connecticut Convention Center, Hartford, Connecticut, U.S.	
19	Win	17–2	(Guyana) Dillon Carew	TKO	2 (6)	Jun 9, 2007	(United States) Connecticut Convention Center, Hartford, Connecticut, U.S.	
18	Loss	16–2	(United States) David Banks	UD	10	Feb 23, 2007	(United States) Mohegan Sun Arena, Montville, Connecticut, U.S.	
17	Loss	16–1	(United States) David Banks	SD	10	Nov 24, 2006	(United States) The Roxy, Boston, Massachusetts, U.S.	
16	Win	16–0	(United States) John Gottschling	TKO	1 (6), 0:19	Jul 21, 2006	(United States) Mohegan Sun Arena, Montville, Connecticut, U.S.	
15	Win	15–0	(United States) Larry Marks	MD	10	Jun 17, 2006	(United States) Mohegan Sun Arena, Montville, Connecticut, U.S.	
14	Win	14–0	(United States) Virgil McClendon	TKO	4 (6), 1:50	May 10, 2006	(United States) Foxwoods Resort Casino, Ledyard, Connecticut, U.S.	
13	Win	13–0	(United States) William Gill	UD	6	Mar 31, 2006	(United States) Mohegan Sun Arena, Montville, Connecticut, U.S.	
12	Win	12–0	(United States) David Estrada	TKO	5 (8), 2:50	Jul 8, 2005	(United States) Athletic Center, New Haven, Connecticut, U.S.	
11	Win	11–0	(United States) Raynard Darden	UD	6	May 6, 2005	(United States) Foxwoods Resort Casino, Ledyard, Connecticut, U.S.	
10	Win	10–0	(Mexico) Jose Medina	TKO	4 (6), 3:00	Apr 1, 2005	(United States) Mohegan Sun Arena, Montville, Connecticut, U.S.	
9	Win	9–0	(United States) Mack Willis	TKO	2 (6)	Dec 17, 2004	(United States) Shaw's Convention Center, Brockton, Massachusetts, U.S.	
8	Win	8–0	(United States) Chance Leggett	TKO	7 (8), 2:24	Nov 11, 2004	(United States) The Roxy, Boston, Massachusetts, U.S.	
7	Win	7–0	(Haiti) Julio Jean	UD	6	Aug 27, 2004	(United States) Mohegan Sun Arena, Montville, Connecticut, U.S.	
6	Win	6–0	(United States) Jacob Rodriguez	UD	6	Jun 12, 2004	(United States) Foxwoods Resort Casino, Ledyard, Connecticut, U.S.	
5	Win	5–0	(United States) Aundalen Sloan	UD	6	May 7, 2004	(United States) Foxwoods Resort Casino, Ledyard, Connecticut, U.S.	
4	Win	4–0	(United States) Chris Troupe	UD	4	Jan 30, 2004	(United States) Blue Horizon, Philadelphia, Pennsylvania, U.S.	
3	Win	3–0	(Canada) Keith Sonley	UD	4	Jan 9, 2004	(United States) Mohegan Sun Arena, Montville, Connecticut, U.S.	
2	Win	2–0	(United States) Darus Hunter	KO	1 (4), 2:40	Nov 11, 2003	(United States) Wachovia Spectrum, Philadelphia, Pennsylvania, U.S.	
1	Win	1–0	(United States) Michael Gutrick	UD	4	Sep 19, 2003	(United States) Ritacco Center, Toms River, New Jersey, U.S.	
