= Ronald Gavril =

Romanian boxer

Personal information
- Nickname: The Thrill
- Nationality: Romanian
- Born: July 10, 1986 (age 40) Bacău, Romania
- Height: 5 ft 11 in (180 cm)
- Weight: Super middleweight

Boxing career
- Reach: 73 1/2 in (187 cm)
- Stance: Orthodox

Boxing record
- Total fights: 29
- Wins: 26
- Win by KO: 21
- Losses: 3
Medal record
Men's Boxing
Representing Romania
Romania National Amateur Boxing Championships
Gold medal – first place	2009 Arad	Super Middleweight
Gold medal – first place	2010 Bacău	Super Middleweight
Cadet World Championships
Bronze medal – third place	2003 Bucharest	Middleweight
European Union Championships
Bronze medal – third place	2005 Cagliari	Middleweight

Ronald Gavril (born July 10, 1986) is a Romanian professional boxer. He is signed to Mayweather Promotions and is currently trained by Eddie Mustafa Muhammad. And he has challenged twice for WBC super-middleweight championship in 2017 & 2018.

== Early life and education ==
Ronald Gavril was born on 10 July 1986 in Bacău, Romania. He credits his two brothers for inspiring him to become a fighter. Although his brothers had been fighters for quite some time, Gavril only joined in 2002 the local boxing club SCM Bacău in his hometown.

== Amateur career ==
As an amateur, he gained a lot of experience as he fought 180 times losing only 15 of those fights. Ronald won in his career no less than ten national titles. Twice he won "Centura de Aur" (the Golden Belt), one of the oldest trophies in the world amateur boxing.

Gavril trained with the National Team of Romania eight-ten months out of the year. He represented his country in international tournaments such as worlds and European (three each). Ronald medalled in Cadet Worlds in 2003 and EU also later in his senior years. Amateur Record: 165-15

== Professional career ==
Gavril turned pro in 2011 at age 25 moving to Los Angeles from Romania, so he did not pursue his dream of representing his country in the London 2012 Olympics. Early on in his professional career he struggled to find a trainer. Gavril was also having trouble getting fights. In May 2012, Ronald decided to move to Las Vegas, Nevada, where he currently resides.

Floyd Mayweather and Mayweather Promotions CEO Leonard Ellerbe took notice to Ronald's skills during his sparring sessions at The Mayweather Boxing Club. Ronald Gavril signed with Mayweather Promotions in March 2013. Gavril won his first eleven fights before dropping a decision to veteran Elvin Ayala. Gavril bounced back by winning his next five bouts before facing Christopher Brooker for the NABF super middleweight title. Gavril stopped Brooker in the tenth and final round, having dropped him twice before that.

Anthony Dirrell was slated to fight David Benavidez for the vacant WBC super middleweight title in September 2017. However, on August 5, the WBC announced Dirrell was out due to injury. Instead, Benavidez would fight Gavril on September 8 for the vacant title. In a close fight, Benavidez defeated Gavril after 12 rounds by split decision (117-111, 116–111, 111–116). With the win, Benavidez became the youngest champion in super middleweight history at the age of 20. Benavidez seemed to struggle with conditioning and he was knocked down in the final round.

=== Benavidez vs. Gavril II ===
Immediately after the first bout, rematch talks began. Gavril thought he won the first bout and disputed the decision. Benavidez's promoter Sampson Promotions confirmed on October 2, 2017, that negotiations had begun with Mayweather Promotions for a rematch to take place in January 2018. Benavidez stated he wanted to take the rematch to remove all doubt and set the record straight. The bout took place at the Mandalay Bay Events Center in Paradise, Nevada. Benavidez won via unanimous decision. The fight averaged 458,000 viewers.

In September 23, 2024 it was reported that Gavril would face Jaime Munguia on December 14, 2024 in Tijuana, Mexico. The bout didn't go ahead.

== Professional boxing record ==
30 fights	27 wins	3 losses
By knockout	22	0
By decision	5	3

No.	Result	Record	Opponent	Type	Round, time	Date	Location	Notes
30	Win	27–3	(Argentina) Victor Hugo Exner	KO	4 (8), 1:39	2025-12-06	(United States) Sports Event Center, Rock Hill, South Carolina, U.S.	
29	Win	26–3	(Colombia) Juan Boada	KO	5 (12), 0:36	2024-11-29	Bucharest Metropolitan Circus, Bucharest, Romania	Won WBF light heavyweight title
28	Win	25–3	(Mexico) Carlos Jesus Gallego Montijo	RTD	7 (10), 3:00	2024-05-17	Polyvalent Hall, Craiova, Romania	
27	Win	24–3	(Argentina) Marcelo Ruben Molina	KO	2 (10), 1:10	2023-12-02	Coquimatlán, Mexico	
26	Win	23–3	(United States) Khainell Wheeler	MD	8	2023-02-18	(United States) Cow Palace, Daly City, U.S.	Won vacant WBC Continental Americas light heavyweight title
25	Win	22–3	(Colombia) Jose Miguel Torres	TKO	6 (10), 3:00	2022-10-29	Coquimatlán, Mexico	
24	Win	21–3	(Mexico) Edgar Romero	TKO	6 (10), 1:25	2022-05-28	Plaza de Toros, Cancún, Mexico	
23	Win	20–3	(Mexico) Miguel Vazquez	TKO	3 (8), 1:22	2020-12-18	Hotel Wyndham Garden, Cancún, Mexico	
22	Win	19–3	(United States) Antowyan Aikens	TKO	2 (10), 2:20	2018-12-07	(United States) Sam's Town Hotel and Gambling Hall, Las Vegas, Nevada, U.S.	
21	Loss	18–3	(United States) David Benavidez	UD	12	2018-02-17	(United States) Mandalay Bay Events Center, Paradise, Nevada, U.S.	For WBC super middleweight title
20	Loss	18–2	(United States) David Benavidez	SD	12	2017-09-08	(United States) The Joint, Paradise, Nevada, U.S.	For vacant WBC super middleweight title
19	Win	18–1	(United States) Decarlo Pérez	KO	3 (8), 2:24	2017-04-29	(United States) Sam's Town Hotel and Gambling Hall, Las Vegas, Nevada	
18	Win	17–1	(United States) Christopher Brooker	TKO	10 (10), 2:04	2016-10-09	(United States) Sam's Town Hotel and Gambling Hall, Las Vegas, Nevada	Won vacant NABF super-middleweight title
17	Win	16–1	(United States) Juan Camilo Novoa	TKO	4 (10), 2:08	2016-05-13	(United States) Sam's Town Hotel and Gambling Hall, Las Vegas, Nevada	
16	Win	15–1	(United States) Mariano Hilario	TKO	4 (8), 2:05	2015-12-18	(United States) Palms Casino Resort, Las Vegas, Nevada	
15	Win	14–1	(United States) Scott Sigmon	RTD	8 (10), 3:00	2015-09-12	(United States) MGM Grand Garden Arena, Las Vegas, Nevada	
14	Win	13–1	(United States) Jessie Nicklow	UD	8	2015-06-21	(United States) MGM Grand Garden Arena, Las Vegas, Nevada	
13	Win	12–1	(United States) Oscar Riojas	UD	8	2015-04-30	(United States) Palms Casino Resort, Las Vegas, Nevada	
12	Loss	11–1	(United States) Elvin Ayala	UD	8	2015-03-28	(United States) Palms Casino Resort, Las Vegas, Nevada	
11	Win	11–0	(Colombia) Jose Miguel Rodriguez Berrio	KO	1 (6), 2:59	2014-12-12	(United States) Alamodome, San Antonio, Texas	
10	Win	10–0	(United States) Thomas Falowo	TKO	7 (8), 2:14	2014-08-30	(United States) Palms Casino Resort, Las Vegas, Nevada	
9	Win	9–0	(United States) Tyrell Hendrix	TKO	4 (8), 1:58	2014-05-03	(United States) MGM Grand Hotel & Casino, Las Vegas, Nevada	
8	Win	8–0	(United States) Cameron Allen	TKO	3 (8), 1:46	2014-02-28	(United States) Turning Stone Resort & Casino, Verona, New York	
7	Win	7–0	(United States) Shujaa El Amin	UD	8	2013-09-14	(United States) MGM Grand Hotel & Casino, Las Vegas, Nevada	
6	Win	6–0	(United States) Dave Courchaine	KO	2 (6), 1:54	2013-08-24	(United States) StubHub Center, Carson, California	
5	Win	5–0	(United States) Jas Phipps	TKO	5 (6), 1:39	2013-07-19	(United States) Hard Rock Hotel and Casino, Las Vegas, Nevada	
4	Win	4–0	(United States) Roberto Yong	TKO	3 (4), 2:12	2013-05-04	(United States) MGM Grand Hotel & Casino, Las Vegas, Nevada	
3	Win	3–0	(United States) Kenneth Taylor Schmitz	TKO	1 (4), 1:53	2012-07-06	(United States) Hard Rock Hotel and Casino, Las Vegas, Nevada	
2	Win	2–0	(Latvia) Andrejs Loginovs	UD	4	2012-02-09	Sala Rapid, Bucharest, Romania	
1	Win	1–0	(United States) Gilbert Gastelum	TKO	3 (4), 2:11	2011-12-01	(United States) Orange County Fair, Costa Mesa, California	

Sporting positions
Regional boxing titles
Vacant Title last held by Gilberto Ramírez	NABF super middleweight champion October 10, 2016 – September 8, 2017; Failed to win world title	Vacant Title next held by Jesse Hart
