= Tim-Robin Lihaug =

Norwegian boxer (born 1992)

Personal information
- Nationality: Norwegian
- Born: 17 September 1992 Bergen, Norway
- Weight: 79.4 kg (175 lb)

Boxing career
- Stance: Orthodox

Boxing record
- Total fights: 24
- Wins: 20
- Win by KO: 10
- Losses: 4
- Draws: 0

Tim-Robin Lihaug (born 17 September 1992 in Bergen) is a light heavyweight Norwegian boxer who turned pro in 2012.

On 29 November 2014, he became the WBO Youth World Champion.

On 23 March 2019, he became the WBO European Champion and the IBA Intercontinental Champion in his home city in Norway.

After boxing in Grieghallen less than a week before the COVID-19 pandemic really hit Norway, he was unable to get new matches because of the prolonged pandemic. In January 2022 Lihaug announced that he would probably retire.

== Professional boxing record ==
Result	Record	Opponent	Type	Date	Location	Notes
24	20-4	(Armenia) Vartan Avetisyan	UD	7 Mar 2020	Grieghallen, Bergen, Norway	
23	19-4	(Finland) Timo Laine	UD	23 Mar 2019	Sotra Arena, Straume, Norway	vacant WBO European light heavy title vacant IBO Intercontinental light heavy title
22	18-4	(Finland) Janne Forsman	TKO	29 Jun 2018	Pabellon Camilo Cano, La Nucia, Spain	
21	17-4	(Ukraine) Vasyl Kondor	UD	3 Feb 2018	Sør Amfi, Arendal, Norway	
20	16-4	(Russia) Sergei Gorokhov	UD	30 Sep 2017	Arena Riga, Riga, Latvia	
19	16-3	(Poland) Tomas Adamek	UD	24 Feb 2017	Oslo Spektrum, Oslo, Norway	
18	16-2	(Hungary) Gergo Horvath	TKO	13 Dec 2016	Arena Armeec, Sofia, Bulgaria	
17	15-2	(Germany) Arthur Abraham	TKO	16 Jul 2016	Max Schmeling Halle, Prenzlauer Berg, Berlin, Germany	vacant WBO International super middleweight title
16	15-1	(Hungary) Jozsef Racz	UD	12 Dec 2015	Brondby Hallen, Brondby, Denmark	
15	14-1	(France) Baptiste Castegnaro	UD	12 Sep 2015	Arena Nord, Frederikshavn, Denmark	
14	13-1	(Norway) Arne Ernsten	KO	20 Jun 2015	Ballerup Super Arena, Ballerup, Denmark	
13	12-1	(Hungary) Istvan Zeller	TKO	2 May 2015	Frederiksberg Hallerne, Copenhagen, Denmark	
12	11-1	(Bosnia and Herzegovina) Slavisa Simeunovic	TKO	14 Mar 2015	Ballerup Super Arena, Ballerup, Denmark	
11	10-1	(Uganda) Farouk Daku	SD	7 Feb 2015	Arena Nord, Frederikshavn, Denmark	
10	9-1	(Georgia (country)) Giorgi Beroshvili	UD	29 Nov 2014	Falconer Centeret, Frederiksberg, Denmark	vacant WBO Youth super middleweight title
9	8-1	(Norway) Simen Smaadal	UD	13 Sep 2014	TAP 1, Copenhagen, Denmark	
8	7-1	(Croatia) Marko Benzon	UD	15 Feb 2014	MusikTeatret, Albertslund, Denmark	
7	6-1	(Russia) Alexander Runde	KO	1 Feb 2014	Arena Nord, Frederikshavn, Denmark	
6	5-1	(Germany) Steve Kroekel	TKO	16 Nov 2013	MusikTeatret, Albertslund, Denmark	
5	4-1	(Bulgaria) Tzvetozar Iliev	TKO	7 Sep 2013	Arena Nord, Frederikshavn, Denmark	
4	3-1	(Sweden) Oscar Ahlin	KO	13 Mar 2013	Arena Nord, Frederikshavn, Denmark	
3	3-0	(Czech Republic) Tomas Kugler	TKO	9 Feb 2013	Blue Water Dokken, Esbjerg, Denmark	
2	2-0	(Lithuania) Vygaudas Laurinkus	UD	11 Aug 2012	Ringside Gym, Leppavaara, Espoo, Finland	
1	1-0	(Lithuania) Egidijus Kakstys	TKO	30 Jun 2012	Ringside Gym, Leppavaara, Espoo, Finland	Professional debut
