= William Abelyan =

Armenian professional boxer (born 1978)

Personal information
- Nickname: The Conqueror
- Nationality: Armenian
- Born: William Abelyan; 27 September 1978 (age 47) Yerevan, Armenian SSR
- Height: 5 ft 5 in (1.65 m)
- Weight: Featherweight

Boxing career
- Reach: 66 in (168 cm)
- Stance: Southpaw

Boxing record
- Total fights: 31
- Wins: 24
- Win by KO: 13
- Losses: 6
- Draws: 1
- No contests: 0

William Abelyan (born September 27, 1978) is a retired Armenian-American professional boxer.

== Early Career ==
Abelyan was born in Armenia and moved to the United States at age nine. He started boxing three years later at the age of twelve. In the early part of his career, he was trained by 1976 Summer Olympics flyweight boxing bronze medalist David Torosyan. He started to box professionally in 1998. Abelyan defeated Orlando Soto for the vacant WBO-NABO featherweight title on August 17, 2002. In 2001 Abelyan defeated Orlando Salido. Salido would later be ranked as the number one featherweight in the world. He boxed at Las Vegas casinos 13 times.

In 2001 he upset former world champion Guty Espadas Jr. by 10-round decision. On June 19, 2004, Abelyan was TKO'd by Scott Harrison for the WBO featherweight world title.

== Injured & Suspended From Boxing ==
Abelyan was ranked as the #1 ranked contender by the World Boxing Organization at one point in his career. He was injured in his last match against Phillip Payne on May 27, 2005 at Gold Coast Hotel and Casino in Las Vegas, Nevada and never fought again. He suffered a subdural hematoma in his match with Payne and was permanently suspended by Nevada Boxing Commission. Abelyan finished his seven-year professional boxing career with a record of 24-6-1 (13 KO's).

== Professional boxing record ==
31 fights	24 wins	6 losses
By knockout	13	3
By decision	11	2
By disqualification	0	1
Draws	1	

No.	Result	Record	Opponent	Type	Round, time	Date	Location	Notes
31	Loss	24–6–1	Phillip Payne	TKO	10 (10), 1:37	27 May 2005	Gold Coast Hotel and Casino, Las Vegas, Nevada, U.S.	
30	Win	24–5–1	Martin Honorio	KO	4 (10), 1:00	5 Nov 2004	Gold Coast Hotel and Casino, Las Vegas, Nevada, U.S.	
29	Loss	23–5–1	Scott Harrison	TKO	3 (12), 1:45	19 Jun 2004	Braehead Arena, Glasgow, Scotland	For WBO featherweight title
28	Win	23–4–1	Alejandro Estrada	KO	3 (8), 0:23	21 Jun 2003	Staples Center, Los Angeles, California, U.S.	
27	Win	22–4–1	Jose Luis Tula	UD	12	21 Mar 2003	The Aladdin, Las Vegas, Nevada, U.S.	Retained WBO-NABO featherweight title
26	Win	21–4–1	Armando Córdoba	MD	10	11 Oct 2002	Creek Nation Gaming Center, Tulsa, Oklahoma, U.S.	
25	Win	20–4–1	Orlando Soto	TKO	10 (12), 1:57	17 Aug 2002	The Aladdin, Las Vegas, Nevada, U.S.	Won vacant WBO-NABO featherweight title
24	Win	19–4–1	Alvin Brown	TKO	2 (8), 3:00	18 May 2002	Mandalay Bay Resort & Casino, Paradise, Nevada, U.S.	
23	Win	18–4–1	Jesus Salud	UD	10	27 Apr 2002	Cox Convention Center, Oklahoma City, Oklahoma, U.S.	
22	Win	17–4–1	Guty Espadas Jr.	UD	10	5 Aug 2001	Plaza Hotel & Casino, Las Vegas, Nevada, U.S.	
21	Win	16–4–1	Marcos Badillo	UD	6	1 Jun 2001	Orleans Hotel & Casino, Las Vegas, Nevada, U.S.	
20	Win	15–4–1	Orlando Salido	UD	6	23 Mar 2001	Sportscenter, Owensboro, Kentucky, U.S.	
19	Win	14–4–1	Adarryl Johnson	TKO	6 (8), 2:25	26 Jan 2001	Orleans Hotel & Casino, Las Vegas, U.S.	
18	Win	13–4–1	Shamir Reyes	TKO	8 (10), 2:36	11 Aug 2000	Paris Las Vegas, Paradise, Nevada, U.S.	
17	Win	12–4–1	Mario Lechowski	TKO	4 (6), 2:42	16 Jun 2000	Orleans Hotel & Casino, Las Vegas, Nevada, U..S	
16	Win	11–4–1	Fernando Omar Lizárraga	KO	4 (6), 0:23	14 Apr 2000	Orleans Hotel & Casino, Las Vegas, Nevada, U.S.	
15	Loss	10–4–1	Víctor Polo	TKO	1 (8)	22 Jan 2000	Del Mar Fairgrounds, Del Mar, California, U.S.	
14	Win	10–3–1	Israel Correa	UD	8	19 Jun 1999	Civic Auditorium, Glendale, California, U.S.	
13	Win	9–3–1	Luis Alfonso Lizárraga	UD	8	27 Mar 1999	Tropicana Hotel & Casino, Las Vegas, Nevada, U.S.	
12	Win	8–3–1	Antonio DeSantiago	UD	4	20 Feb 1999	Spotlight 29 Casino, Coachella, California, U.S.	
11	Draw	7–3–1	Juan Luis Torres	PTS	8	6 Feb 1999	Big League Dream Sports Park, Cathedral City, California, U.S.	
10	Win	7–3	Luis Enrique Valenzuela	TKO	1 (?)	19 Dec 1998	Spotlight 29 Casino, Coachella, California, U.S.	
9	Loss	6–3	Héctor Lizárraga	UD	10	20 Nov 1998	Fresno Fair Pavilion, Fresno, California, U.S.	
8	Win	6–2	Juan Roberto Colin	KO	3 (6)	17 Oct 1998	Spotlight 29 Casino, Coachella, California, U.S.	
7	Win	5–2	Joey Borrero	TKO	1 (?)	19 Sep 1998	Arizona Charlie's, Las Vegas, Nevada, U.S.	
6	Win	4–2	Roger Medal	TKO	5 (6), 0:58	18 Jul 1998	Arizona Charlie's, Las Vegas, Nevada, U.S.	
5	Win	3–2	Frankie Carmona	KO	2 (4)	30 May 1998	Olympic Auditorium, Los Angeles, California, U.S.	
4	Win	2–2	Israel Correa	UD	4	16 May 1998	Fantasy Springs Casino, Indio, California, U.S.	
3	Win	1–2	Alejandro González	UD	4	18 Apr 1998	Cow Palace, Daly City, California, U.S.	
2	Loss	0–2	Alejandro González	DQ	1 (4)	9 Apr 1998	Sports Arena, San Diego, California, U.S.	Abelyan tossed out for an alleged hit while opponent was down
1	Loss	0–1	Jose Antonio Vargas	UD	4	18 Fab 1998	Spotlight 29 Casino, Coachella, California, U.S.	

== See also ==
- List of Armenian boxers
