= Sebastian Sylvester =

German boxer

Personal information
- Nickname: Hurrikan
- Nationality: German
- Born: 9 July 1980 (age 45) Greifswald, East Germany
- Height: 5 ft 7.5 in (171 cm)
- Weight: Middleweight

Boxing career
- Stance: Orthodox

Boxing record
- Total fights: 40
- Wins: 34
- Win by KO: 16
- Losses: 5
- Draws: 1

Sebastian Sylvester (born 9 July 1980) is a German former professional boxer who competed from 2002 to 2011 and held the IBF middleweight title from 2009 to 2011.

== Professional career ==
In March 2007 Sylvester retained the WBA Inter-Continental Middleweight Title against Alessio Furlan at the Stadthalle, Rostock, Germany.

On 2 November 2008, Felix Sturm retained the WBA middleweight title via unanimous decision (118-110, 118-110 and 119-109) over Sylvester. He improved to 31-2-1, while Sylvester fell to 31–3.

He won the vacant IBF middleweight title by beating Giovanni Lorenzo on 19 September 2009 by split decision.

== Professional boxing record ==
40 fights	34 wins	5 losses
By knockout	16	3
By decision	18	2
Draws	1	

No.	Result	Record	Opponent	Type	Round, time	Date	Location	Notes
40	Loss	34–5–1	(Poland) Grzegorz Proksa	RTD	3 (12), 3:00	1 Oct 2011	Jahnsportforum, Neubrandenburg, Germany	For vacant European middleweight title
39	Loss	34–4–1	(Australia) Daniel Geale	SD	12	7 May 2011	Jahnsportforum, Neubrandenburg, Germany	Lost IBF middleweight title
38	Win	34–3–1	(Germany) Mahir Oral	UD	12	30 Oct 2010	Stadthalle, Rostock, Germany	Retained IBF middleweight title
37	Draw	33–3–1	(Russia) Roman Karmazin	SD	12	5 Jun 2010	Jahnsportforum, Neubrandenburg, Germany	Retained IBF middleweight title
36	Win	33–3	(United States) Billy Lyell	TKO	10 (12), 0:37	30 Jan 2010	Jahnsportforum, Neubrandenburg, Germany	Retained IBF middleweight title
35	Win	32–3	(Dominican Republic) Giovanni Lorenzo	SD	12	19 Sep 2009	Jahnsportforum, Neubrandenburg, Germany	Won vacant IBF middleweight title
34	Win	31–3	(United States) Lajuan Simon	UD	12	27 Jun 2009	Max-Schmeling-Halle, Berlin, Germany	Retained IBF International middleweight title
33	Win	30–3	(Italy) Gaetano Nespro	KO	7 (12), 2:39	28 Feb 2009	Jahnsportforum, Neubrandenburg, Germany	Won vacant IBF International middleweight title
32	Loss	29–3	(Germany) Felix Sturm	UD	12	1 Nov 2008	König Pilsener Arena, Oberhausen, Germany	For WBA middleweight title
31	Win	29–2	(Spain) Javier Castillejo	KO	12 (12), 1:53	12 Apr 2008	Jahnsportforum, Neubrandenburg, Germany	Retained European middleweight title
30	Win	28–2	(France) Francois Bastient	UD	12	26 Jan 2008	Tempodrom, Berlin, Germany	Retained European middleweight title
29	Win	27–2	(Italy) Simone Rotolo	SD	12	27 Oct 2007	Messehalle, Erfurt, Germany	Retained European middleweight title
28	Win	26–2	(Finland) Amin Asikainen	TKO	11 (12)	23 Jun 2007	Stadhalle, Zwickau, Germany	Won European middleweight title
27	Win	25–2	(Italy) Alessio Furlan	TKO	12 (12), 0:44	3 Mar 2007	Stadthalle, Rostock, Germany	Retained WBA Inter-Continental middleweight title
26	Win	24–2	(Australia) Peter Mitrevski, Jr.	TKO	8 (12), 0:44	16 Dec 2006	BigBox, Kempten, Germany	Retained WBA Inter-Continental middleweight title
25	Win	23–2	(France) Franck Mezaache	UD	12	23 Sep 2006	Rittal Arena, Wetzlar, Germany	Won vacant WBA Inter-Continental middleweight title
24	Win	22–2	(Czech Republic) Petr Rykala	TKO	3 (8)	28 Jul 2006	First Fitness Club, Vienna, Austria	
23	Loss	21–2	(Finland) Amin Asikainen	TKO	8 (12), 2:48	3 Jun 2006	TUI Arena, Hanover, Germany	Lost European middleweight title
22	Win	21–1	(United Kingdom) Steven Bendall	TKO	3 (12), 0:57	22 Apr 2006	SAP Arena, Mannheim, Germany	Retained European middleweight title
21	Win	20–1	(Italy) Lorenzo Di Giacomo	UD	12	12 Nov 2005	Alsterdorfer Sporthalle, Hamburg, Germany	Retained European middleweight title
20	Win	19–1	(France) Morrade Hakkar	UD	12	16 Jul 2005	Arena Nürnberger Versicherung, Nuremberg, Germany	Won European middleweight title
19	Win	18–1	(Portugal) Eliseo Nogueira	UD	8	14 May 2005	Oberfrankenhalle, Bayreuth, Germany	
18	Win	17–1	(France) Christophe Tendil	UD	12	12 Mar 2005	Stadhalle, Zwickau, Germany	Retained IBF Inter-Continental middleweight title
17	Win	16–1	(France) Robert Roselia	KO	2 (12), 1:03	18 Dec 2004	Oberfrankenhalle, Bayreuth, Germany	Won IBF Inter-Continental middleweight title
16	Win	15–1	(Botswana) Clive Johnson	KO	2 (8), 1:36	23 Oct 2004	Tempodrom, Berlin, Germany	
15	Win	14–1	(Germany) Dirk Dzemski	TKO	7 (12)	17 Jul 2004	Anhalt Arena, Dessau, Germany	Retained German BDB and German International middleweight titles; Won NBA middleweight title
14	Win	13–1	(Armenia) Roman Aramyan	UD	10	20 Mar 2004	Maritim Hotel, Cologne, Germany	Retained German International middleweight title
13	Win	12–1	(Germany) Danny Thiele	TKO	4 (10)	31 Jan 2004	Sportcenter Jumps, Berlin, Germany	Won vacant German BDB middleweight title
12	Win	11–1	(Armenia) Roman Aramyan	PTS	10	25 Oct 2003	Sportcenter Jumps, Berlin, Germany	Won German International middleweight title
11	Win	10–1	(Czech Republic) Patrik Hruska	PTS	6	20 Sep 2003	Hanns-Martin-Schleyer-Halle, Stuttgart, Germany	
10	Win	9–1	(Poland) Przemyslaw Miszew	PTS	4	24 May 2003	Karl Eckel Halle, Hattersheim am Main, Germany	
9	Win	8–1	(Czech Republic) Victor Farkas	KO	1 (6)	21 Mar 2003	Sportcenter Jumps, Berlin, Germany	
8	Win	7–1	(Czech Republic) Patrik Hruska	UD	6	1 Mar 2003	Ballhaus Arena, Aschersleben, Germany	
7	Win	6–1	(Czech Republic) Petr Rykala	TKO	3	11 Jan 2003	Universal Hall, Berlin, Germany	
6	Win	5–1	(Czech Republic) Gabriel Botos	TKO	3 (6), 3:00	29 Nov 2002	Berlin, Germany	
5	Win	4–1	(Germany) Mohammed Rasuli	PTS	6	19 Oct 2002	Hansahalle, Berlin, Germany	
4	Win	3–1	(Poland) Mateusz Lorek	KO	3 (4), 2:15	21 Sep 2002	GETEC Arena, Magdeburg, Germany	
3	Win	2–1	(Poland) Grzegorz Lewandowski	PTS	4	7 Sep 2002	Circus Krone, Munich, Germany	
2	Win	1–1	(Germany) Andreas Moeller	PTS	4	25 Aug 2002	Berlin, Germany	
1	Loss	0–1	(Russia) Yuri Zaytsev	KO	1 (4), 1:34	26 May 2002	Berlin, Germany	

== See also ==
- List of middleweight boxing champions

Sporting positions
Regional boxing titles
Preceded by Morrade Hakkar	European middleweight champion 16 July 2005 – 3 June 2006	Succeeded by Amin Asikainen
Vacant Title last held by Arthur Abraham	WBA Inter-Continental middleweight champion 23 September 2006 – 12 April 2008; Won world title eliminator	Vacant Title next held by Avtandil Khurtsidze
Vacant Title last held by Sebastien Demers	IBF International middleweight champion 28 February 2009 – 19 September 2009; Won world title	Vacant Title next held by Benjamin Simon
World boxing titles
Vacant Title last held by Arthur Abraham	IBF middleweight champion 19 September 2009 – 7 May 2011	Succeeded by Daniel Geale
