= Alexander Abraham (boxer) =

Armenian-German boxer

Personal information
- Nationality: Armenian
- Born: Alexander Abrahamyan; 14 July 1981 (age 45) Yerevan, Armenian SSR, Soviet Union
- Weight: Light Middleweight

Boxing career
- Stance: Orthodox

Boxing record
- Total fights: 26
- Wins: 25
- Win by KO: 17
- Losses: 0
- Draws: 1
- No contests: 0

Alexander "Alex" Abraham (born Alexander Abrahamyan on 14 July 1981 in Yerevan, Armenia) is a former Armenian-German professional boxer residing in Berlin, Germany. On 25 October 2008 he won the vacant EBU-EE light middleweight title from Roman Dzhuman and retained it twice. He is the younger brother of Arthur Abraham.

== Amateur career ==
Alexander Abraham boxed as an amateur for the boxing department of 1. FC Nürnberg and won several regional championship titles during this time in the light welter and welterweight divisions. His greatest success was his victory at the International German Junior Welterweight Championship in 1997.

== Professional career ==
In 2003 he was hired by Wilfried Sauerland together with his brother, Arthur Abraham. He won his first professional fight on November 22, 2003 against the Czech Petr Rykala, winning by knockout in the second round. He only drew against Senegalese Sylvain Gomis in April 2005. In October 2008 he won the vacant EBU-EE light middleweight title against the Ukrainian Roman Dzuman.

== Retirement ==
Abraham announced his retirement on 7 February 2010 at the age of 28, due to an unexplained dizziness. Although intensive examinations did not produce any negative results in advance, the stall of profibox promoter Wilfried Sauerland agreed with the boxer's request for a contract termination.

== See also ==
- List of Armenian boxers
