= Mahir Oral =

German boxer (born 1980)

- Born: May 23, 1980 (age 46); Hamburg, West Germany
- Occupation: Professional boxer
- Years active: 2000–2011
- Boxing career
- Nickname: Lion
- Height: 6 ft 1 in (185 cm)
- Weight: Middle
- Reach: 71.5 in (182 cm)
- Stance: Orthodox

Boxing record
- Total fights: 34
- Wins: 28
- Win by KO: 11
- Losses: 4
- Draws: 2

Mahir Oral (born 23 May 1980) is a German professional boxer.

== Personal life ==
Mahir Oral was born in Hamburg, West Germany on 23 May 1980.

== Boxing career ==
Oral competed in professional boxing from early 2000 through February 2011. As of January 2021, BoxRec described Oral—also called "Lion—as being 6 feet 1 inch (1.85 m) tall with a 71 1/2-inch (1,820 mm) reach. He is classified as a middleweight boxer with an orthodox stance. Since 4 March 2000, Oral has competed in 34 professional boxing bouts (winning 28), totalling 195 rounds, with a knockout rate of 32.35 percent:

Oral's bouts

=== Professional bouts ===
Date	Opponent	Outcome	Location
4 March 2000	Gábor Balogh	Won by unanimous decision	Toruń, Poland
27 May 2000	Robert Sathy	Won by technical knockout	Koblenz, Germany
24 June 2000	Marek Koupil	Won by technical knockout	Toruń, Poland
30 September 2000	Cristinel Acatrinei	Won by technical knockout	Rotterdam, Netherlands
20 October 2001	Zbigniew Bajsarowicz	Won by points decision	Treptow-Köpenick, Germany
26 January 2002	Gabriel Botos	Won by points decision	Germany
7 September 2002	Evgenij Rakk	Won by points decision	Munich, Germany
21 March 2003	Juri Wolf	Draw by points decision	Weißensee, Germany
13 December 2003	Alexander Awdijan	Draw by points decision	Nuremberg, Germany
27 March 2004	Malik Dziarra	Lost by points decision	Magdeburg, Germany
18 June 2005	Attila Kathi	Won by unanimous decision	Pula, Croatia
2 July 2005	Richard Remen	Won by technical knockout	Altona, Germany
9 July 2005	Ramdane Kaouane	Won by points decision	Magdeburg, Germany
10 September 2005	Joseph Sovijus	Won by knockout	Weißensee, Germany
25 October 2005	Ihar Filonau	Won by unanimous decision	Vienna, Austria
12 November 2005	Christophe Karagoz	Won by split decision	Alsterdorf, Germany
13 December 2005	József Balázs	Won by unanimous decision	Sölden, Austria
7 January 2006	Attila Kiss	Won by unanimous decision	Munich, Germany
11 March 2006	Arsen Khachatrian	Won by unanimous decision	Altona, Germany
15 July 2006	Francesco Pernice	Won by technical knockout	Altona, Germany
10 November 2006	Genaro Andujar	Won by knockout	Alsterdorf, Germany
6 July 2007	Murad Makhmudov	Won by unanimous decision	Germany
26 April 2008	Joel Mayo	Won by technical knockout	Trabzon, Turkey
30 May 2008	Alexander Sipos	Won by unanimous decision	Barakaldo, Spain
4 July 2008	Jurijs Boreiko	Won by points decision	Ankara, Turkey
18 September 2009	Alexander Sipos	Won by unanimous decision	Castellón de la Plana, Spain
23 January 2010	Fabio Liggieri	Won by majority decision	Cuxhaven, Germany
12 February 2011	Jozsef Matolcsi	Lost by corner retirement	Herning, Denmark

=== Title bouts ===
Date	Opponent	Outcome	Title(s)	Location
9 September 2006	Dirk Dzemski	Won by technical knockout	Vacant EBU European Union Middle Title	Wandsbek, Germany
24 March 2007	Domenico Spada	Won by split decision	World Boxing Council International Middle Title; EBU European Union Middle Title	Alsterdorf, Germany
18 November 2008	Alexander Sipos	Won by corner retirement	World Boxing Council Mediterranean Middle Title	Cuxhaven, Germany
27 June 2009	Arthur Abraham	Lost by technical knockout	International Boxing Federation World Middle Title	Prenzlauer Berg, Germany
27 March 2010	Juan Camilo Novoa	Won by technical knockout	World Boxing Council International Middle Title	Alsterdorf, Germany
30 October 2010	Sebastian Sylvester	Lost by unanimous decision	International Boxing Federation World Middle Title	Rostock, Germany
