= Ulli Wegner =

German boxer and sports coach

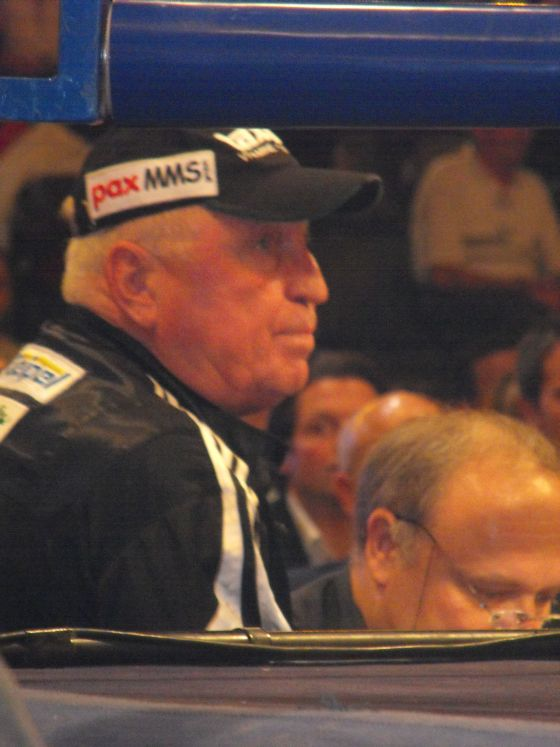
Ulli Wegner.

Ulli Wegner (born 26 April 1942, in Stettin) is a German Boxing Coach and a former Amateur boxer.

== Biography ==
Ulli Wegner grew up in former East Germany, where he first learned to box. He had a total of 176 amateur fights: between 1961 and 1963 for ASK Vorwärts Rostock, from 1963 to 1964 for SC Turbine Erfurt and from 1964 until the end of his amateur career Wegner boxed for BSG Wismut Gera. Ulli Wegner was a multiple time regional Champion and his biggest success came in 1970 when Wegner won the East Germany Championships with his team from Wismut Gera.

Right after his active career, Wegner became a trainer for BSG Wismut Gera in 1971 which became BSG Wismut Gera 2 years later. Between 1974 and 1979, Wegner worked as a talent scout in the district Gera. From 1979 to 1990, Wegner worked for the Berliner TSC. After the fall of the Berlin Wall, Wegner became the national coach of the DABV (German Amateur Boxing Association) in the olympic center in Berlin in 1991. Under amateur trainer Ulli Wegner, German Amateur Boxers won overall around 150 medals at Olympic Games, World- and European Championships as well as the Military Games, 65 of those medals being Gold medals. In 1996 Oktay Urkal won a Silver Medal in the Olympic Games in Atlanta, while Thomas Ulrich won a Bronze Medal.

Boxing promoter Wilfried Sauerland finally convinced Wegner to change to the professionals. Wegner changed from training amateur boxers to training pro boxers after the Olympic Games in Atlanta. Since then he trains for Sauerland up to 10 Boxers. As a pro Trainer, Ulli Wegner helped Kubrat Pulev win the regular heavyweight world title of the world boxing association also Sven Ottke and Markus Beyer (who were turned pro by Wegner), Arthur Abraham, Robert Helenius, Cecilia Brækhus and Marco Huck win Championships of World Associations. Torsten May, Oktay Urkal, Karo Murat, Marco Huck and Eduard Gutknecht became European Champions under trainer Ulli Wegner.

== Personal life ==
Wegner is married and has 3 children. Wegner has lived in Berlin-Tegel together with his wife since 2004. Since the state selections of September 2006, Ulli Wegner is also active in politics for his residential district Reinickendorf. In 2010, Wegner was awarded the Cross of the Order of Merit of the Federal Republic of Germany for his achievements in German athletics and his social commitment. In 2011, a new sports hall in the city Usedom was inaugurated and named after Ulli Wegner.

== See also ==
- Arthur Abraham
