= Lajuan Simon =

American boxer

Personal information
- Born: February 25, 1979 (age 47) Philadelphia, Pennsylvania, U.S.
- Height: 1.85 m (6 ft 1 in)
- Weight: Middleweight

Boxing career
- Stance: Orthodox

Boxing record
- Total fights: 31
- Wins: 23
- Win by KO: 12
- Losses: 5
- Draws: 2
- No contests: 1

Lajuan Simon (born February 25, 1979) is an American professional boxer from Philadelphia, Pennsylvania that fights as a middleweight.

Simon has twice fought for major world boxing titles. On March 13, 2009, he lost a unanimous decision to Arthur Abraham for the IBF middleweight title. On December 9, 2011, he lost by a first round knockout to Gennady Golovkin for the WBA (regular) and the vacant IBO middleweight titles.

Simon also holds a victory over Elvin Ayala for the regional USBA championship.

== Professional boxing record ==
31 fights	23 wins	5 losses
By knockout	12	2
By decision	11	3
Draws	2	
No contests	1	

No.	Result	Record	Opponent	Type	Round, time	Date	Location	More
31	Loss	23–5–2 (1)	(United States) J'Leon Love	KO	6 (10), 2:48	Dec 6, 2013	(United States) Little Creek Casino Resort, Shelton, Washington, U.S.	
30	Loss	23–4–2 (1)	(Kazakhstan) Gennady Golovkin	KO	1 (12), 2:17	Dec 9, 2011	Ballsaal Interconti-Hotel, Düsseldorf, Germany	For WBA (Regular) and vacant IBO middleweight titles
29	Loss	23–3–2 (1)	(Colombia) Dionisio Miranda	SD	12	Dec 3, 2010	(United States) Dover Downs, Dover, Delaware, U.S.	For vacant WBC Continental Americas middleweight title
28	Win	23–2–2 (1)	(United States) Jose Angel Rodriguez	UD	10	Jun 26, 2010	(United States) Turning Stone Resort Casino, Verona, New York, U.S.	
27	Win	22–2–2 (1)	(United States) Elvin Ayala	UD	12	Oct 17, 2009	(United States) Palms Casino Resort, Paradise, Nevada, U.S.	Retained IBF-USBA middleweight title
26	Loss	21–2–2 (1)	(Germany) Sebastian Sylvester	UD	12	Jun 27, 2009	Max-Schmeling-Halle, Berlin, Germany	For IBF International middleweight title
25	Loss	21–1–2 (1)	(Germany) Arthur Abraham	UD	12	Mar 14, 2009	Ostseehalle, Kiel, Germany	For IBF middleweight title
24	Win	21–0–2 (1)	(United States) Jose Spearman	TKO	3 (8), 1:06	Dec 5, 2008	(United States) Blue Horizon, Philadelphia, Pennsylvania, U.S.	
23	Win	20–0–2 (1)	(Puerto Rico) Emmanuel Gonzalez	RTD	6 (8), 3:00	Oct 29, 2008	(United States) Medieval Times, Lyndhurst, New Jersey, U.S.	
22	Win	19–0–2 (1)	(United States) James Morrow	TKO	1 (10), 2:23	May 31, 2008	(United States) Showboat Hotel & Casino, Atlantic City, New Jersey, U.S.	
21	Win	18–0–2 (1)	(Mexico) Elco Garcia	UD	10	Feb 15, 2008	(United States) Showboat Hotel & Casino, Atlantic City, New Jersey, U.S.	
20	Win	17–0–2 (1)	(United States) Corey Johnson	UD	12	Sep 13, 2007	(United States) Genetti Manor, Dickson City, Pennsylvania, U.S.	Won vacant IBF-USBA middleweight title
19	Win	16–0–2 (1)	(United States) William Gill	UD	6	Mar 23, 2007	(United States) National Guard Armory, Philadelphia, Pennsylvania, U.S.	
18	Win	15–0–2 (1)	(United States) Levan Easley	SD	8	Aug 18, 2006	(United States) DoubleTree Westshore Hotel, Tampa, Florida, U.S.	
17	Win	14–0–2 (1)	(United States) Joe Park	RTD	7 (8), 3:00	Jun 9, 2006	(United States) Tropicana Resort & Casino, Atlantic City, New Jersey, U.S.	
16	Draw	13–0–2 (1)	(United States) Darnell Boone	PTS	6	Apr 28, 2006	(United States) Mohegan Sun Arena, Montville, Connecticut, U.S.	
15	Win	13–0–1 (1)	(United States) Alberto Albaladejo	TKO	4 (10), 0:26	Feb 17, 2006	(United States) DoubleTree Westshore Hotel, Tampa, Florida, U.S.	Won vacant NBA Jr. Intercontinental super middleweight title
14	Win	12–0–1 (1)	(Jamaica) Richard Grant	UD	10	Dec 10, 2005	(United States) Turning Stone Resort Casino, Verona, New York, U.S.	
13	Win	11–0–1 (1)	(United States) Don Labbe	TKO	3 (8), 2:51	Oct 28, 2005	(United States) Wildwoods Convention Center, Wildwood, New Jersey, U.S.	
12	Win	10–0–1 (1)	(Cameroon) Manu Ntoh	TKO	7 (10)	Aug 13, 2005	(United States) Turning Stone Resort Casino, Verona, New York, U.S.	Won UBA super middleweight title
11	Win	9–0–1 (1)	(United States) Yameen I Muhammad	TKO	3 (6), 3:00	Jul 15, 2005	(United States) Dover Downs, Dover, Delaware, U.S.	
10	Win	8–0–1 (1)	(United States) Jameel Wilson	MD	8	Apr 15, 2005	(United States) National Guard Armory, Philadelphia, Pennsylvania, U.S.	
9	NC	7–0–1 (1)	(United States) Horace Cooper	NC	1 (6), 3:00	Nov 5, 2004	(United States) Blue Horizon, Philadelphia, Pennsylvania, U.S.	Cooper cut above left eye after accidental headbutt
8	Win	7–0–1	(United States) Matthew Thompson	TKO	4 (6), 2:49	Nov 14, 2003	(United States) Turning Stone Resort Casino, Verona, New York, U.S.	
7	Win	6–0–1	(United States) Robert Marsh	TKO	2 (6)	Sep 12, 2003	(United States) Dover Downs, Dover, Delaware, U.S.	
6	Win	5–0–1	(United States) William Scales	UD	4	Aug 15, 2003	(United States) Blue Horizon, Philadelphia, Pennsylvania, U.S.	
5	Win	4–0–1	(United States) Jacob Rodriguez	UD	4	May 2, 2003	(United States) Blue Horizon, Philadelphia, Pennsylvania, U.S.	
4	Win	3–0–1	(United States) Russell Snyder	KO	2 (4)	Apr 24, 2003	(United States) Days Inn, Allentown, Pennsylvania, U.S.	
3	Win	2–0–1	(United States) Kevin Johnson	TKO	1 (4)	Jan 31, 2003	(United States) Blue Horizon, Philadelphia, Pennsylvania, U.S.	
2	Draw	1–0–1	(Dominican Republic) Jose Diaz	PTS	4	Nov 15, 2002	(United States) Blue Horizon, Philadelphia, Pennsylvania, U.S.	
1	Win	1–0	(United States) Kiran Hill	UD	4	Sep 7, 2002	(United States) Fernwood Resort, Bushkill, Pennsylvania, U.S.	
