= Alessio Furlan =

Italian boxer

Personal information
- Nicknames: Il Guerriero di Rocca Canavese ("The Warrior from Rocca Canavese")
- Nationality: Italian
- Born: 16 October 1976 (age 49) Ivrea, Turin, Piedmont, Italy
- Weight: Light-middleweight; Super-middleweight

Boxing career
- Stance: Orthodox

Boxing record
- Total fights: 50
- Wins: 27
- Win by KO: 9
- Losses: 18
- Draws: 5

Alessio Furlan (born 16 October 1976) is an Italian professional boxer. He is a former IBF Mediterranean and Italian junior-middleweight champion.

== Debut and Kaddour fight ==
Furlan boxed to national level as an amateur before turning professional in May 2001, winning his first fight at Settimo Torinese, Italy, in which Furlan knocked out Slovakian Robert Andrasik in the third of six rounds.

Furlan's explosive knockout power eluded him in his following fights although Furlan remained undefeated in his first five fights. Furlan then fought US based Lebanese boxer Ahmed Kaddour, a former contestant on The Contender, the reality television series. The fight took place at Braunschweig, Germany. The fight went the full distance with Kaddour winning narrowly on points to inflict Furlan with the first defeat of his professional career.

== Cotena title fights ==
After sixteen fights, Furlan fought in his first title fight when he faced Neapolitan Elio Cotena in July 2004 for the Italian Light Middleweight Title at the Toscolano Maderno, Turin.

The first fight was stopped in the fourth round and called a technical draw. A rematch was then scheduled to take place in November 2004 in Turin. This time Furlan emerged the victor with a sixth round stoppage.

In October 2005, Furlan faced Alexander Polizzi for the vacant IBF Mediterranean Light Middleweight Title in Rivarolo Canavese. Furlan added to title to his tally with a tenth-round knockout over Polizzi.

== Sylvester WBA Inter-Continental title fight ==
Furlan's highest profile fight came in March 2007 against Germany's European Middleweight title holder Sebastian Sylvester for the WBA Inter-Continental Middleweight Title at the Stadthalle, Rostock, Germany. Sylvester was due to fight Amin Asikainen but Asikainen pulled out due to injury.

The fight took place on the undercard of a bill that included Alexander Povetkin, Timo Hoffmann, Robert Stieglitz and Alejandro Berrio.

Sylvester controlled much of the fight Furlan having spells of success. Furlan was down in the seventh round however he rallied and pushed Sylvester cutting him in the tenth round however the fight was stopped by the referee in the final round. Sylvester stated that Furlan "an iron head" and that there was little he could do that would stop Furlan and was surprised at the stamina of Furlan and the punches he could take.

Furlan's follow up fight, in May 2007, was a victory over Hungarian Attila Kiss.

== Duddy fight ==
Furlan was lined up to be the first opponent of what was being billed as "The Homecoming" of Irish fighter John Duddy in Dublin, Ireland. Furlan stated that he was going to spoil Duddy's homecoming and upset his perfect record because he had spotted a weakness in Duddy's style and was going to expoilt that. Furlan was quoted as saying "“I have great respect for John Duddy but I will come with my own tactical plan to beat him. He is tough and not afraid of anyone so he’s just like me in that respect. I will be out to spoil his homecoming but I’ll buy Duddy a pint of Guinness afterwards to apologise for beating him!".

The fight was a keenly contested bout with both fighters suffering cuts. Duddy floored Furlan in the tenth round however Furlan rose to beat the count. Duddy sensed that Furlan was in trouble and piled forward and floored Furlan again at which point the referee stopped the fight with less than ten seconds to go in the fight.
