= Piotr Wilczewski =

Polish boxer

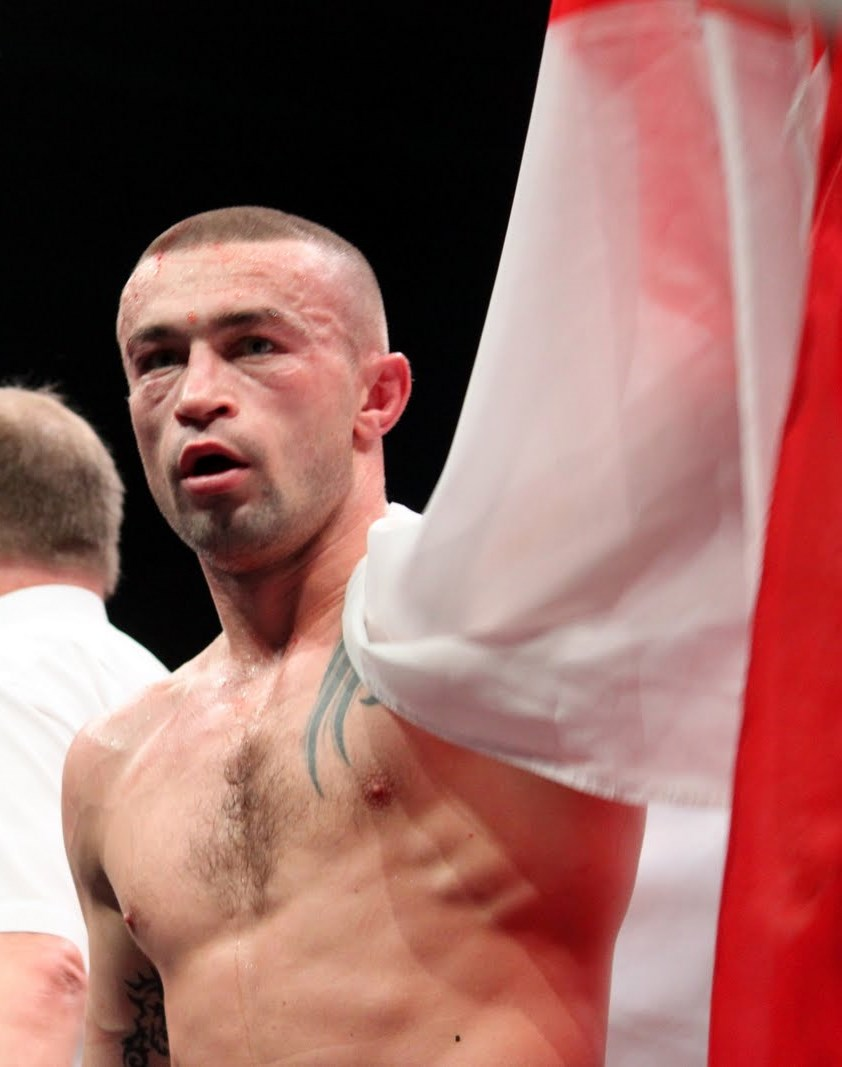
- Wilczewski in March 2011

Personal information
- Nickname: Wilk
- Nationality: Polish
- Born: 9 August 1978 (age 47) Dzierżoniów, Poland
- Weight: Super middleweight

Boxing career
- Stance: Orthodox

Boxing record
- Total fights: 35
- Wins: 32
- Win by KO: 10
- Losses: 3

Piotr "Skawiński" Wilczewski (born 9 August 1978) is a Polish professional boxer and former EBU super middleweight champion.

== Professional career ==
Wilczewski won his first 22 fights before facing Curtis Stevens on 11 July 2009, who stopped him in three rounds. On 3 March 2011, Wilczewski defeated Amin Asikainen by an eleventh-round TKO to become the European super middleweight champion. In his first defence of the title, Wilczewski lost a close majority decision to James DeGale on 15 October 2011. He unsuccessfully attempted to regain his European title against Arthur Abraham on 31 March 2012, losing a unanimous decision.

== Professional boxing record ==
35 fights	32 wins	3 losses
By knockout	10	1
By decision	22	2

No.	Result	Record	Opponent	Type	Round, time	Date	Location	More
35	Win	32–3	(Georgia (country)) Giorgi Kandelaki	PTS	8	6 Oct 2018	Recreational Sport Hall, Dzierżoniów, Poland	
34	Win	31–3	(Ukraine) Volodymyr Borovskyy	UD	6	1 Jun 2012	Sport Hall, Rzeszów, Poland	
33	Loss	30–3	(Germany) Arthur Abraham	UD	12	31 Mar 2012	Sparkassen-Arena, Kiel, Germany	For WBO European super middleweight title
32	Win	30–2	(Serbia) Geard Ajetović	SD	8	17 Feb 2012	Urania Hall, Olsztyn, Poland	
31	Loss	29–2	(United Kingdom) James DeGale	MD	12	15 Oct 2011	(United Kingdom) Echo Arena, Liverpool, England	Lost WBO Inter-Continental and European super middleweight titles
30	Win	29–1	(Finland) Amin Asikainen	TKO	11 (12), 1:24	4 Mar 2011	Hartwall Arena, Helsinki, Finland	Won vacant WBO Inter-Continental and vacant European super middleweight titles
29	Win	28–1	(Sweden) Karlo Tabaghua	UD	12	11 Dec 2010	OSiR, Grodzisk Mazowiecki, Poland	Won vacant IBO International super middleweight title
28	Win	27–1	(Spain) Miguel Angel Pena	TKO	2 (10), 0:53	17 Sep 2010	Urania Hall, Olsztyn, Poland	
27	Win	26–1	(France) Aziz Daari	UD	10	9 Apr 2010	Recreational Sport Hall, Dzierżoniów, Poland	Won vacant TWBA and vacant Republic of Poland International super middleweight titles
26	Win	25–1	(Latvia) Jurijs Boreiko	KO	6 (8), 1:38	19 Dec 2009	MOSiR Hall, Radom, Poland	
25	Win	24–1	(United States) Demetrius Davis	UD	10	13 Nov 2009	Gwardia Hall, Koszalin, Poland	Won interim TWBA super middleweight title
24	Win	23–1	(Latvia) Ruslans Pojonisevs	UD	6	2 Oct 2009	MOSiR Hall, Chełm, Poland	
23	Loss	22–1	(United States) Curtis Stevens	TKO	3 (8), 1:46	11 Jul 2009	(United States) Prudential Center, Newark, New Jersey, U.S.	
22	Win	22–0	(Colombia) Elkin Ubarnes	UD	6	14 Feb 2009	OSiR, Grodzisk Mazowiecki, Poland	
21	Win	21–0	(Belarus) Kanstantsin Makhankou	UD	6	3 Oct 2008	Globus Hall, Lublin, Poland	
20	Win	20–0	(Russia) Sergey Kharchenko	KO	7 (10), 1:33	7 Aug 2008	OSiR, Świebodzice, Poland	Retained TWBA super middleweight title
19	Win	19–0	(United States) Thomas Reid	TKO	2 (6), 2:59	11 Jul 2008	(United States) Aragon Ballroom, Chicago, Illinois, U.S.	
18	Win	18–0	(Venezuela) Jairo Alvarez	UD	10	13 Mar 2008	Sport Hall, Dzierżoniów, Poland	Retained TWBA super middleweight title
17	Win	17–0	(Estonia) Dmitri Protkunas	UD	6	15 Dec 2007	MOSiR Hall, Ożarów Mazowiecki, Poland	
16	Win	16–0	(Germany) Bernard Donfack	UD	10	16 Nov 2007	Sport Hall, Tarnów, Poland	Retained TWBA super middleweight title
15	Win	15–0	(Belgium) Djamel Selini	UD	12	9 Jun 2007	Spodek, Katowice, Poland	Won TWBA super middleweight title
14	Win	14–0	(Russia) Anton Krasnolutsky	UD	8	29 Mar 2007	Sport Hall, Wołomin, Poland	
13	Win	13–0	(Russia) Tagir Rzaev	UD	8	16 Dec 2006	Sport Hall, Poznań, Poland	
12	Win	12–0	(Ukraine) Taras Boyko	UD	6	24 Nov 2006	OCSiR, Ostróda, Poland	
11	Win	11–0	(Belgium) Makusu Kimfuta	TKO	9 (10)	20 Oct 2006	City Hall, Włocławek, Poland	Retained WBF International super middleweight title
10	Win	10–0	(United States) Ottu Holifield	UD	6	23 Jun 2006	(United States) Odeum Expo Center, Villa Park, Illinois, U.S.	
9	Win	9–0	(Belgium) Mike Algoet	UD	10	3 Jun 2006	City Hall, Ostrołęko, Poland	Won vacant WBF International super middleweight title
8	Win	8–0	(Hungary) Szabolcs Rimovszky	KO	1 (6), 1:40	6 Apr 2006	OSiR, Grodzisk Mazowiecki, Poland	
7	Win	7–0	(Belarus) Aliaksandr Vaiavoda	TKO	4 (6), 2:05	17 Dec 2005	Sport Hall, Żyrardów, Poland	
6	Win	6–0	(Russia) Ruslan Semenov	UD	6	1 Dec 2005	Sport Hall, Ostrołęka, Poland	
5	Win	5–0	(Russia) Ruslan Yakupov	UD	6	27 Oct 2005	OSiR, Grodzisk Mazowiecki, Poland	
4	Win	4–0	(Algeria) Ramdane Kaouane	RTD	3 (6), 3:00	5 Aug 2005	OSiR Polna, Warsaw, Poland	
3	Win	3–0	(Germany) Mario Lupp	UD	4	29 Apr 2005	OSiR, Świebodzice, Poland	
2	Win	2–0	(Germany) Dmitri Libich	TKO	4 (4)	25 Feb 2005	OSiR, Włocławek, Poland	
1	Win	1–0	(Latvia) Jevgenijs Andrejevs	UD	4	10 Dec 2004	MCKiS Hall, Jaworzno, Poland	
