= Arthur Abraham =

Armenian-German boxer (born 1980)

Arthur Abraham Ավետիք Աբրահամյան
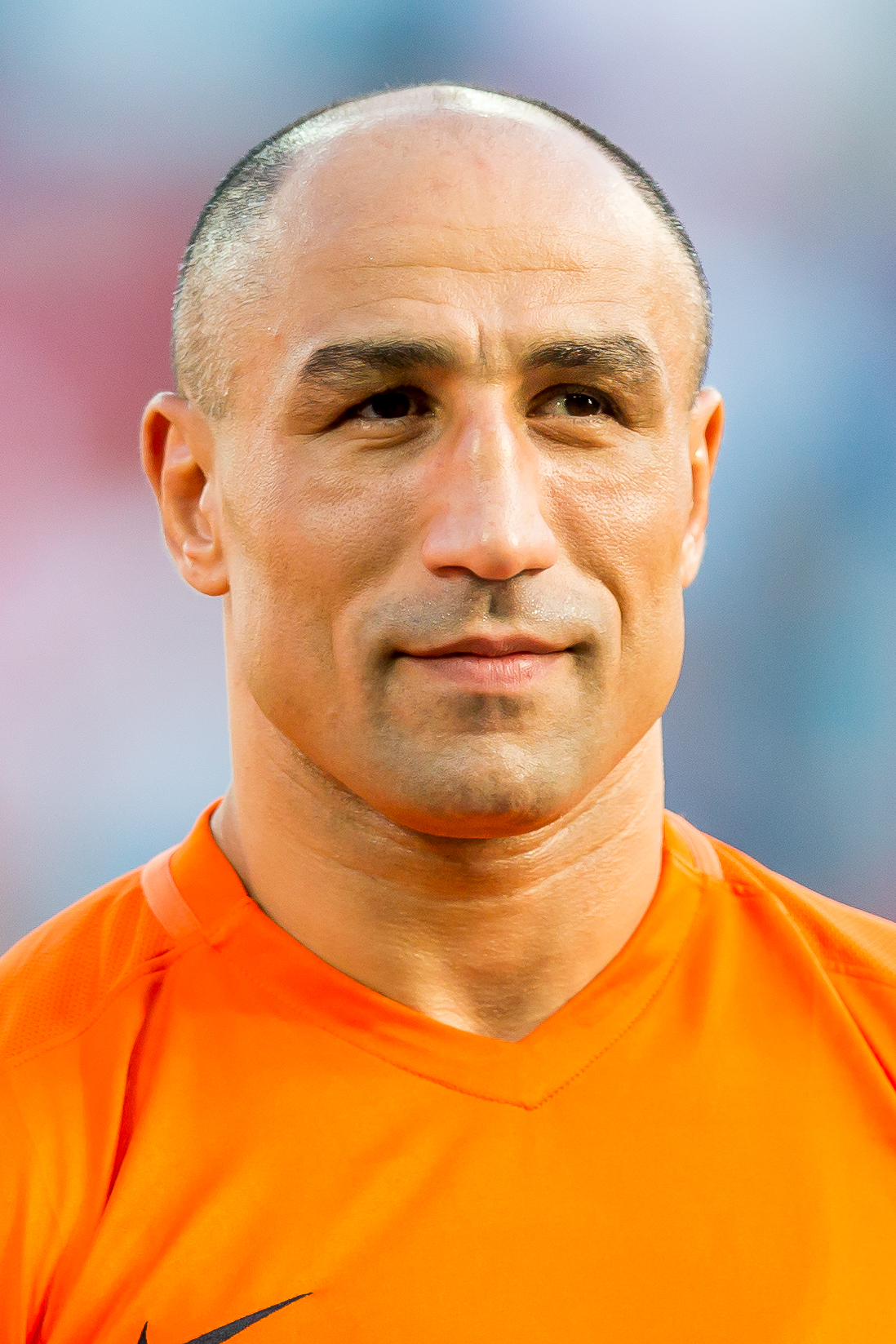
- Abraham in 2016

Personal information
- Nicknames: King Arthur; Abrahammer
- Nationality: German; Armenian
- Born: Avetik Abrahamyan; 20 February 1980 (age 46) Yerevan, Armenian SSR, Soviet Union
- Height: 5 ft 9 in (175 cm)
- Weight: Middleweight; Super-middleweight

Boxing career
- Reach: 72 in (183 cm)
- Stance: Orthodox

Boxing record
- Total fights: 53
- Wins: 47
- Win by KO: 30
- Losses: 6

Avetik Grigori Abrahamyan (Armenian: Ավետիք Գրիգորի Աբրահամյան; born 20 February 1980), best known as Arthur Abraham, is an Armenian-born German former professional boxer who competed from 2003 to 2018. He held multiple world championships in two weight classes, including the International Boxing Federation (IBF) middleweight title from 2005 to 2009, and the World Boxing Organization (WBO) super-middleweight title twice between 2012 and 2016.

== Early life ==
Avetik Abrahamyan was born in Yerevan, Soviet Armenia on 20 February 1980 to parents Grigor and Sylvia Abrahamyan. He moved to Germany with his parents and brothers in 1995 at the age of 15. As a teenager, Abraham showed an interest in cycling and eventually became the North Bavarian and Franconian Youth Champion. However, after watching an exciting Mike Tyson fight, Arthur was inspired to become a boxing star too. In 1999, Arthur and his brothers returned to Armenia for military service. After 2002, all the brothers had finished their military service and returned to Germany in 2003.

== Amateur career ==
Abraham boxed as an amateur in Bamberg and later in Nuremberg. He was an International junior welterweight German champion in 1997 and a three time Senior light middleweight Armenian champion in 2000, 2001 and 2002. Abraham attempted to compete for Armenia at the 2000 Summer Olympics, but was unable due to his two years of military service. In 2003, with Arthur and his brother Alexander returned to Germany, hoping to begin a professional boxing career. His final amateur record was 81–3–6 (48 KOs).

In 2003, Arthur and Alexander competed alongside promoter and manager Wilfried Sauerland and his head coach Ulli Wegner. Arthur was a sparring partner for IBF and WBA super middleweight champion Sven Ottke, whom was in the preparations of a title defense. Wegner was so impressed that he began to train Arthur personally.

=== Amateur highlights ===
- 1997 International light-welterweight German champion
- 2000, 2001 and 2002 Senior light-middleweight Armenian champion

== Professional career ==
=== Middleweight ===
==== Early career ====
Abraham started his professional career on 16 August 2003. The Sauerland-promoted Abraham had many early victories. He defeated Canadian southpaw Ian Gardner (18–1) for the vacant WBA Inter-Continental middleweight title, Hector Velazco (former WBO champion) and contender Nader Hamdan (36–1).

In July 2005, Abraham defended his WBA Inter-Continental title against the highly regarded Briton Howard Eastman. Eastman had previously only lost to American William Joppy and former Undisputed middleweight champion Bernard Hopkins.

=== IBF middleweight champion ===
==== Abraham vs. Ikeke ====
On 10 December 2005, in Leipzig, Germany, Abraham won the vacant IBF middleweight title against Kingsley Ikeke (23–1, 13 KOs) by a 5th round knock-out. The IBF belt had previously been vacated by undisputed champion Jermain Taylor after a bout with Abraham was denied in October that year. In the fifth round, Arthur met Ikeke with hard shots to the head. Ikeke began to tumble toward the canvas and Abraham landed some final rights to seal the victory.

Abraham defended his title on 5 March 2006 with a unanimous decision against Australian Shannan Taylor. Two months later, Abraham won a second title defense against Kofi Jantuah, also on points.

==== Abraham vs. Miranda ====
On 23 September 2006, Abraham won a decision against undefeated contender Edison Miranda despite having his jaw broken in two places in round four. Miranda took advantage of this by fighting dirty. Miranda was docked five points for landing repeated low blows as well as intentionally headbutting Abraham. However, even without the five points deducted, Abraham would have still won the fight (114–109, 115–109, 116–109). Abraham's jaw was operated on the night after the fight. He had 22 screws inserted into two titanium plates. After the Miranda bout, Arthur was praised for his ability to finish the fight despite his injury.

Abraham defeated Canadian Sébastien Demers by KO in the third round after two minutes and fifty-seven seconds. Abraham was clearly physically superior than his opponent. Arthur won his fifth title defense by defeating fellow Armenian Khoren Gevor by 11th-round knockout from a powerful left hook.

==== Abraham vs. Elcock, Ayala ====
On 8 December 2007, Abraham defeated Wayne Elcock to make his sixth title defense by technical knockout in the 5th round.

During two of his matches, Abraham was accompanied by live performances of the Scorpions and is currently accompanied by the track "Ready For The Fight" by The Young Punx.

On 29 March 2008, Abraham defeated American Elvin Ayala via 12th-round KO after connecting with a devastating left hook that sent his opponent crashing to the canvas face first. This was Abraham's 7th successful title defence.

==== Abraham vs. Miranda II ====
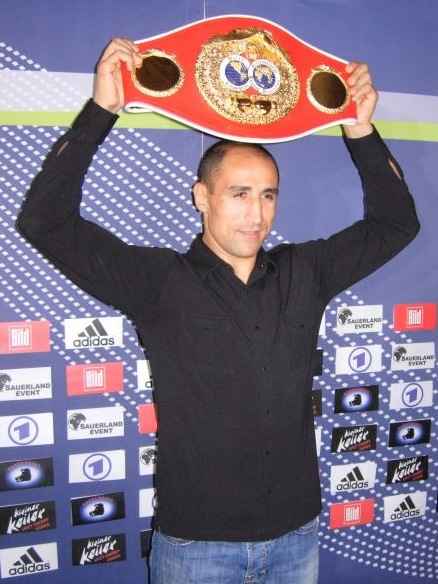
Abraham with the IBF middleweight title, 2008

On 21 June 2008, a rematch between Abraham and Miranda took place at a catchweight of 166 lbs. Abraham's IBF middleweight title was not on the line. In the first minute of the fourth round, a perfectly timed right hand-left hook sent Miranda to the floor. Miranda rose, clearly hurt. Another left hook would drop Miranda along the ropes and Miranda would again rise but his legs were clearly gone and the end was at hand. Abraham landed a final striking right hand for the round's third knockdown as the referee leapt in to halt the action before Miranda could attempt to rise again.

==== Abraham vs. Marquez ====
On 8 November 2008, Abraham defeated Raúl Márquez (41–4–1, 29 KOs), 37, by a 6th round technical knockout, at the Bamberg's Jako Arena, the 8th defense of his IBF middleweight boxing title.

He retained his IBF title on 14 March 2009 against Lajuan Simon, his first fight over 12 rounds since his legendary battle against Edison Miranda. The 10th and final defense of his middleweight title took place in Berlin against Mahir Oral. Abraham won this fight by a 10th-round technical knockout. Oral's coach threw in the towel after several knockdowns.

=== Super-middleweight ===
==== Super Six World Boxing Classic ====
After failing to secure a match-up with WBO and WBC champion Kelly Pavlik or WBA champion Felix Sturm, Abraham announced that he would change his weight class to compete at super middleweight. Abraham participated in the Super Six World Boxing Classic tournament for the WBA and WBC super middleweight titles. Fellow participants were: WBA champion Mikkel Kessler, WBC champion Carl Froch, Andre Dirrell, Andre Ward and Jermain Taylor.

===== Abraham vs. Taylor =====
In his first match of the tournament, Abraham faced Jermain Taylor on 17 October 2009. Arthur was previously supposed to fight Taylor for the undisputed middleweight title, but the fight fell through. Abraham defeated Taylor via a devastating knockout in the 12th round. Taylor was hospitalized with a severe concussion, suffering short-term memory loss, unable to remember details of this bout. Taylor was replaced with veteran Allan Green in the tournament. After being released from the hospital, Taylor released a statement saying that he's doing just fine and wanted to congratulate Abraham on his victory and wish him well in the tournament. Former heavyweight champion Mike Tyson was in attendance and was impressed by Abraham's intensity and determination.

As of the end of 2009, The Ring has ranked Abraham as the 14th best boxer in the world. On 5 March 2010, Abraham was ranked #8 in the world by Yahoo! Sports.

===== Abraham vs. Dirrell =====
On 27 March 2010, Abraham fought American boxer Andre Dirrell in the second stage of the Super Six World Boxing Classic at the Joe Louis Arena in Detroit, Michigan. At the end of round 10, Dirrell was comfortably ahead 97–92, 98–91 and 97–92 on the scorecards. In round 10, Abraham knocked Dirrell down following a straight right, but the referee ruled it a slip. Abraham lost via disqualification due to hitting Dirrell after he slipped in the 11th round. Dirrell slipped after being hit on the chin near the corner. The fight was stopped at 1:13 of the round. After he slipped, Abraham landed a right hand to his chin, knocking him down and out completely. Through a translator, Abraham said, "I was not looking at his feet, I was looking at his eyes. I didn't see if he was down." After the punch, the ring immediately filled up with people including Andre's brother Anthony. Andre was taken to hospital for a brain scan. Anthony later confirmed that his brother was alright. Abraham suffered his first defeat professionally due to the disqualification.

===== Abraham vs. Froch =====
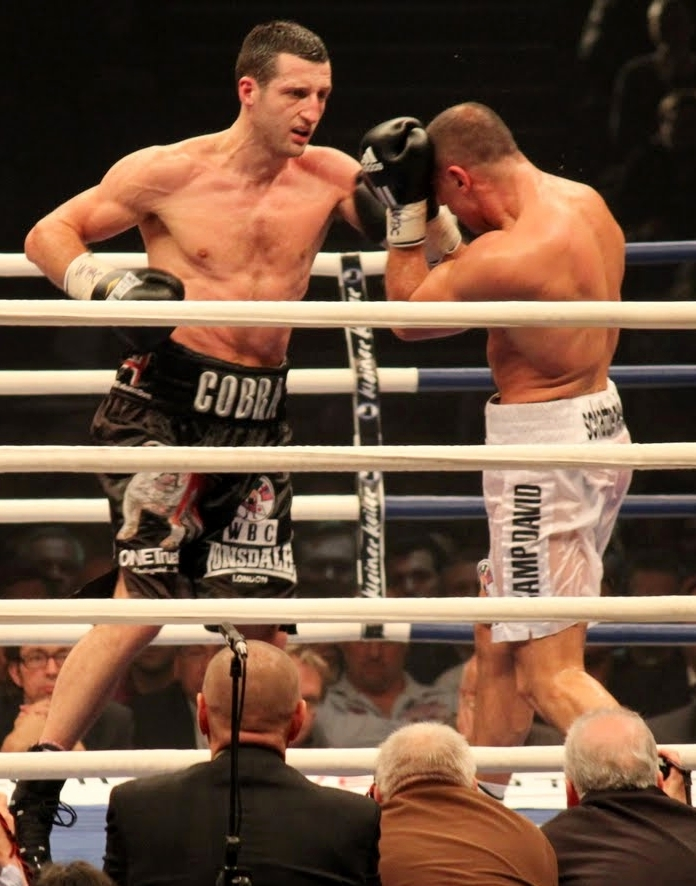
Abraham (right) vs. Carl Froch

Abraham was next scheduled to fight British boxer Carl Froch (26–1, 20 KOs), also for the vacant WBC super middleweight title on 27 November 2010. The fight was pushed back from 2 October in Monaco due to Froch suffering a back injury. The fight took place at the Hartwall Arena in Helsinki, Finland. Abraham failed to become a two-weight world champion, losing to Froch in his third fight of the tournament. Abraham was dominated from start to finish, losing by a unanimous decision. The scores given by the judges were 119–109, 120–108 and 120–108, which reflected the one-sided nature of the bout. Abraham was disappointed with his performance, "I wanted to hit him. I tried but I could not do it. Nothing more to say." Froch stated it was his best performance to date.

===== Abraham vs. Ward =====
Abraham qualified for the semifinals, having one win out of three fights. But first, Abraham had a pre-fight with Croatian contender Stjepan Božić. Abraham won by technical knockout in the second round due to an injury in Božić's hand.

On 14 May 2011, Abraham fought undefeated American Andre Ward in the Super Six semi finals for the WBA super middleweight title. The fight took place at the Home Depot Center in Carson, California. Abraham entered having lost two of his previous three bouts. Ward started out slow with Abraham, trying to find a way to penetrate his tight defense. After a competitive first few rounds, Ward seized control of the fight, using his ring savvy and instincts to control Abraham. Although Abraham was somewhat passive at times, he gave an earnest effort and frequently threw combinations that were mostly blocked by Ward. Abraham hurt Ward a couple of times in the final round, but it wasn't enough to finish Ward, who had dominated the fight and won a lopsided unanimous decision. The three judges scored the bout 120–108, 118–110 & 118–111. ESPN had it 118–110 in favor of Ward. Abraham didn't believe he had lost the fight with such wide scores. Over 12 rounds, Ward threw 289 jabs. In total he landed 178 of 444 total punches thrown (40%). Ward went on to defeat Froch in the finals and won the Super Six World Boxing Classic tournament.

=== Comeback ===
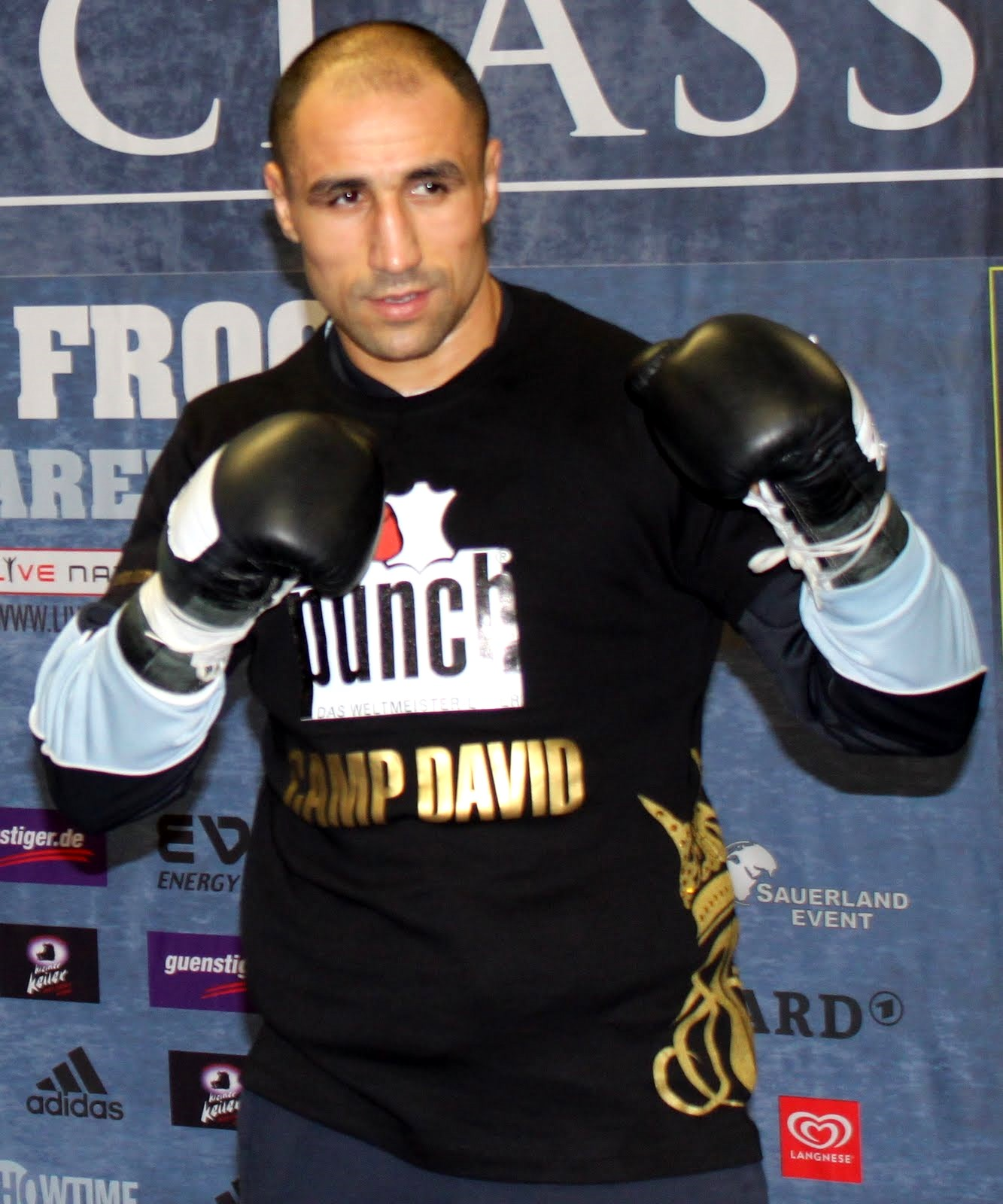
Abraham in 2010

On 30 October 2011, Abraham originally announced that he intended to return to the middleweight division in 2012 but later decided to remain at super middleweight.

In his first comeback fight on 14 January 2012, Abraham defeated Argentinian Pablo Oscar Natalio Farias via technical knockout in round five and won the vacant WBO European super middleweight championship. After Abraham landed several hard combinations that put Farias down three times in the fifth round, referee Manuel Maritxalar stopped the fight. On 31 March 2012, Abraham defeated former EBU super middleweight champion Piotr Wilczewski by a lopsided unanimous decision to retain his WBO European title. Wilczewski was docked a point in the seventh round and was down in the eleventh round, though it was ruled a slip.

=== WBO super-middleweight champion ===
==== Abraham vs. Stieglitz ====
In April 2012, the WBO announced that they had removed George Groves as their mandatory challenger and replaced him with Abraham, meaning the latter would now be in line to challenge WBO super middleweight champion Robert Stieglitz (41–2, 23 KOs). Sauerland Event confirmed the fight would take place on 25 August in Berlin at the O2 World. Abraham won a twelve-round unanimous decision over Stieglitz to capture the WBO championship in a spectacular battle which made Abraham a two-division champion. Abraham became the second Armenian and the first German to win championships in two different divisions. The judges' scores were 116–112, 116–112 and 115–113. Abraham was named best boxer of Germany in 2012 by BoxSport magazine. His coach Ulli Wegner was also named the best coach of the year.

==== Abraham vs. Bouadla, Stieglitz II ====
On 9 October 2012 Mehdi Bouadla (26–4–0, 11 KOs) was confirmed as Abraham's first title defence at super middleweight. The fight took place on 15 December at Nüremberg Arena, Nüremberg, Germany. Abraham retained his title against Bouadla on 15 December 2012. He won via technical knockout in the eighth round. A cut beside Bouadla's right eye streamed blood into his eyes, impeding his vision and causing the stoppage of the bout, as he could not see Abraham's punches and as such took brutal punishment. In the post fight, Abraham said, "This is where I started boxing. To be here now, in front of 10,000 people as world champion -- there's no better feeling."

Five days after the Bouadia fight, a rematch with Stieglitz was discussed to take place in the first quarter of 2013. In January, Abraham stated the fight would take place on 3 March. At the time, Stieglitz was entering a legal dispute after allegedly assaulting his father-in-law, which he stated was self-defence. The fight took place in Stieglitz's home of Magdeburg, Sachsen-Anhalt, Germany in front of 8,000 at the GETEC Arena. Abraham's eye rapidly swelled shut in the second round and he could soon no longer see. The referee waved him off at the start of the fourth round, resulting in his defeat. CompuBox stats showed that Stieglitz was in full control of the rematch, landing 70 of 203 punches thrown (34%), with Abraham landed 27 of his 107 thrown (25%). Stieglitz out-landed Abraham 63–19 in power punches.

=== Regaining composure ===
After losing the World title, Abraham had two more fights in 2013. First he beat Willbeforce Shihepo (20–4, 15 KOs) by 12 round unanimous decision (116–113, 117–111 & 116–112). Abraham claimed the vacant WBO Inter-Continenteal super middleweight title. Two months later, Abraham successfully defended the title against Giovanni De Carolis (20–4, 10 KOs) by unanimous decision (120–108, 119-109 twice).

=== WBO super-middleweight champion ===
==== Abraham vs. Stieglitz III, Sjekloca ====
A rubber match with Stieglitz (46–3, 26 KOs) took place on 1 March 2014, with the WBO super middleweight title on the line once again at the GETEC Arena in Magdeburg, Germany. After a purse bid was ordered where the minimum bid was $300,000, Stieglitz promoter Ulf Steinforth of SES bid $3,135,000 on 9 December, easily beating the other bid, which came from Abraham's promoter Sauerland Event at $1,541,414. Stieglitz, being the champion was entitled to $2,351,250 (75%), while Abraham would receive the remaining $783,750 (25%). In a very close fight through 11 rounds, Stieglitz took a knee in the twelfth round, as Abraham's counter-punching took its toll. Stieglitz was the 'come forward' aggressor with jab attacks. Abraham fought with counterattacks that wore Stieglitz down late. Abraham won the fight by split decision (112–113, 114–111 & 115–110). CompuBox stats showed that Abraham landed 140 of 451 punches thrown (31%), Stieglitz landed 106 of his 489 (22%). Abraham was much more active in the final 5 rounds and worked his jab, which was the key to winning the fight.

In April, Abraham planned a quick first defence to be made two months later against Serbian Nikola Sjekloca (28–1, 8 KOs). The fight took place at Velodrom in Berlin, Germany on 3 May 2014. The fight went the full 12 rounds as Abraham came out victorious on points on all three judges scorecards (116–112, 116–113, 119–110). Abraham believed he had broken his hand in round 7 and boxed sensibly for the remainder of the fight.

==== Abraham vs. Smith I, II ====
Promoter Kalle Sauerland announced on 21 July 2014, that Abraham would defend his WBO title against English boxer Paul Smith (35–3, 20 KOs) at Sparkassen-Arena in Germany on 27 September. Talks for the fight began in May 2014. Prior to the fight, Smith stated he had studied Abraham's loss to Carl Froch. Froch used Smith as a sparring partner before their fight. Abraham defeated Smith to retain his title in a controversial decision. The fight went full 12 rounds as Abraham won on all three judges scorecards by a wide margin (119–109 & 117–111 twice). The scorecards were derided in some quarters for being too wide given the competitiveness of the fight. Many British fans in attendance booed the decision. Smith's promoter Eddie Hearn dubbed the decision a "disgrace".

The WBO stated they would review the fight and decision, with the possible outcome being a rematch. In October, the WBO rejected Smith's request for an immediate rematch, however confirmed that he would stay in the top 5 in their rankings. Smith still believed that he would get another opportunity through a voluntary defence.

By the end of October, Abraham made the WBO aware that he could fight Smith again in the 2015. In December 2014, a deal was reached for the rematch to take place. The fight would take place on 21 February 2015 at the O_{2} World Arena in Berlin. With another win, Abraham was hoping to set up a fight with Felix Sturm. With 9,000 fans in attendance, the fight went the full 12 rounds as Abraham won via points on all three scorecards (116–112, 117–111 twice). Abraham was mostly dominant during the fight when he unloaded a barrage of power punches, and spent some time against the ropes, covering up, to keep himself becoming fatigued. After the fight, Smith praised Abraham, "I felt I left it all in there tonight, I'm not going home with any or many regrets. He shook me once or twice, he was better tonight (than the first fight)." The fight averaged more than 4 million viewers SAT1 in Germany.

==== Abraham vs. Stieglitz IV, Murray ====
Abraham fought Robert Stieglitz (47–4–1 27 KOs) for the fourth and final time on 18 July 2015 at the Gerry Weber Stadium, Nordrhein-Westfalen, Germany. The fight was billed as 'Final Showdown'. The WBO ordered the fight on 26 February, giving both camps 90 days to reach a deal. A deal was reached by both camps on 9 April. Although having a 3–1 lead against Stieglitz, Abraham promised to win via KO to cement his place as the number 1 super-middleweight. Prior to the fight, Abraham made plans to continue his boxing career for a further two more years before considering the possibility of retirement. In an interview, he said, "I will not lose. I plan on continuing my career for at least another two years and then retiring along with my coach and my world championship belt. " He also made plans to possibly unify the division. Abraham won via TKO in the sixth round. Stieglitz was knocked down in round 4 once but managed to pick himself back up. Abraham was ahead on three judges scorecards at the time on stoppage (48–46, 50–44, 49–45).

On 7 October 2015, Matchroom Sport announced that negotiations were done for Abraham to defend his WBO world title on 21 November against 33 year old British boxer Martin Murray (32–2–1, 15 KOs) at the TUI Arena in Hanover. Murray was still looking for his first world title after being stopped late by world middleweight champion Gennady Golovkin earlier in the year in what was his third world title challenge. Murray was on a three match winning streak since. The fight went full 12 rounds as Abraham won via split decision (116–111, 115–112, 112–115). Murray lost one point for holding in round eleven, which did not affect the outcome. Abraham praised Murray during the post fight interview, "I trained hard, have shed blood and sweat. I was technically and tactically the better boxer. But I didn't box against a punchbag. He is a world-class fighter, who put in a good fight and you have to acknowledge that."

==== Abraham vs. Ramírez ====
It was announced on 18 January 2016 that undefeated #1 WBO Gilberto Ramírez (33–0, 24 KOs) would be challenging Abraham for the WBO super middleweight in the co-feature bout on 9 April undercard of the Manny Pacquiao vs. Timothy Bradley III card on HBO pay-per-view. The fight card took place at the MGM Grand in Las Vegas, Nevada. All three judges scored the fight 120–108 for Ramírez, who became the first Mexican fighter to win a super middleweight world title. Ramírez won on the punch count by outworking Abraham in almost very round with a superior jab, a consistent mix of head and body power punches, and superior head and foot movement. Abraham slipped to a (1–3) record in the United States following the defeat. In the post fight interview, Ramírez said, "I took to him a Mexican boxing school. He was a very, very strong puncher, but he couldn't take any movement. I knew halfway through the fight I was going to win the fight. I came here to make history, and I did it."

=== Later career ===
Team Sauerland announced that Abraham would fight on 16 July 2016 in his first bout since losing his 168-pound world title on 9 April. Abraham would face 23 year old Tim-Robin Lihaug (15–1, 8 KOs) for the vacant WBO International super middleweight title at the Max-Schmeling-Halle in Berlin. Abraham won the fight with a decisive TKO victory stopping Lihaug in round 8 to claim the title, previously vacated by Gilberto Ramirez.

Early talks in October suggested Abraham and Martin Murray (33–4–1, 16 KOs) could meet for the second time in Monaco on 12 November 2016. The fight was scheduled take place at the Salle des Étoiles. The fight was announced as a non-title bout, where the winner would be the mandatory challenger for the WBO super middleweight title, the same title Abraham lost to Gilberto Ramírez in April 2016. Abraham suffered an elbow injury in training which pulled him off the card. It was thought that a rematch would take place at a future date, however Murray would find another opponent for the Monte Carlo card. Russian boxer Dmitry Chudinov would step in Abraham's place until he withdrew due to a virus, having Nuhu Lawal replace him.

==== Abraham vs. Krasniqi ====
The World Boxing Organization ordered a purse bid to take place on 4 January 2017 in Hungary for an eliminator between Abraham, ranked number two and number three ranked two time light heavyweight challenger Robin Krasniqi (46–4, 17 KOs) with $300,000 being the minimum bid. On 14 January, an agreement was reached for an eliminator to take place on 22 April. A press conference on 19 February confirmed that the fight would take place at the Messe Erfurt Convention Center in Erfurt, Germany. Abraham constantly hurt Krasniqi in the second half of the fight on his way to winning a 12-round unanimous decision and once again earned a world title match. The judges at ringside scored the fight 118–110, 115–114 and 117–111 in Abraham's favor. Krasniqi started the fight well using his height advantage. The fight turned around when Abraham caught Krasniqi in round 6 with a right hand. This turned the fight around and put Krasniqi on the back-foot. Abraham spent most of the later rounds cutting off the ring.

==== Abraham vs. Eubank Jr. ====
Reports suggested on 1 June 2017 that Chris Eubank Jr. would make his ring return in July 2017 defending his IBO super middleweight title against Abraham in London. It is believed that Eubank Jr. was offered in the region of £3 million. The two potential dates discussed were the 15 and 22 July. It would be regarded as Eubank Jr.'s biggest fight since his loss to Saunders in 2014. On 5 June, it was confirmed that the fight would take place at the Wembley Arena on 15 July and televised on ITV Box Office. The official press announcement was scheduled to take place on 7 June. On 7 July, the World Boxing Super Series announced the winner would be taking part in the super-middleweight knockout tournament. At the Draft Gala in Monte Carlo on 8 July, Chris Eubank Sr., who represented both Abraham and Eubank Jr. picked undefeated Turkish contender Avni Yildrim (16–0, 10 KOs). At the weigh in, Abraham weighed 12st 1lb 5oz, which was 1lb 13oz over the limit. He was given two hours to lose the extra weight. Eubank Jr. weighed inside the limit at 11st 13lb 3oz. It was said that if Abraham couldn't make weight a second time, the fight would still take place in a non-title fight. Abraham made weight on third attempt.

Eubank Jr. won via a unanimous decision with the scorecards 120–108, 120–108 and 118–110. Abraham had little to offer, mostly in defence mode as Eubank Jr. outlanded and outpointed him. Eubank Jr. landed uppercuts throughout the fight, many single and some in combinations, with Abraham only managing to connect a few shots clean, but left little to no damage. Abraham suffered his second defeat in his last four fights.

==== Abraham vs. Nielsen ====
On 13 March 2018, Danish newspaper BT reported that Abraham and Danish boxer Patrick Nielsen could fight next, although there was no agreement, the bout was being lightly discussed. Nielsen was coming off a loss to British boxer John Ryder in October 2017. On 19 March, the fight was officially confirmed to take place on 28 April at the Baden Arena in Offenburg, Germany. On fight night, Abraham dropped Nielsen on his way to edge out a win via split decision after 12 rounds to win the vacant WBO International title. Two judges scored the bout 116–111 each for Abraham and the remaining judge scored it 114–113 for Nielsen. Abraham pressured Nielsen throughout landing heavy shots. Nielsen used good movement around the ring, catching Abraham with jabs and combinations, however, he lacked the punching power to keep Abraham at a distance.

=== Retirement ===
In 2021, Abraham announced his retirement from boxing following a successful career with a record of 47–6 (30 KOs). One of the main reasons for retirement, at the age of 40, was to spend more time with his family.

== Life outside of boxing ==
Abraham appeared in Cologne, Germany for an exhibition match against entertainer Oliver Pocher on 24 October 2009 in a bouncy, castle-like "ring" and fought with huge, air-cushion-like boxing gloves. On 9 April 2010, Abraham took to the dance show Let's Dance on RTL with partner Nina Uszkureit, but left after the first episode of the show in order to concentrate fully on his boxing career.

In the film Max Schmeling (2010), he played a supporting role of boxer Richard Vogt, Schmeling's last opponent. Just as in real life, Ulli Wegner was in his corner.

German actor and producer Til Schweiger invited Abraham to act in his film Crime Scene (2013). Til and Abraham had been friends for a long time. Abraham played a pimp that is a leader of a gang that controls the shadow business in the film.

Abraham was among the panel of judges for the "Miss Germany" beauty pageant in 2012 and 2013.

On 9 January 2013, the RA Ministry of Diaspora hosted a presser for Abraham. Minister Hranush Hakobyan praised Abraham as a role model and awarded him the "Poghos Nubar" medal.

Abraham sent a letter of condolence on the death of Vladimir Yengibaryan to his family.

== Personal life ==
His family members call him "Avo", short for Avetik. Abraham married his wife Lusya Hovhannisyan. They have 3 children: Grigor, Maria, Diana. His younger brother Alexander is also a professional boxer.

Abraham plans on opening a boxing school in Armenia following his future retirement. He will also have foreign-language classes for students at the boxing school, such as English and German, to help have success internationally.

He received German citizenship in August 2006, while also retaining his Armenian citizenship.

On 21 September 2008, Abraham and fellow boxer Vic Darchinyan were honored by Armenian President Serge Sargsyan during a 20th anniversary celebration of the nation's independence. Both men were awarded with medals "For the great services for Armenia" of the first degree.

== Professional boxing record ==
53 fights	47 wins	6 losses
By knockout	30	1
By decision	17	4
By disqualification	0	1

No.	Result	Record	Opponent	Type	Round, time	Date	Location	Notes
53	Win	47–6	Patrick Nielsen	SD	12	28 Apr 2018	Baden-Arena, Offenburg, Germany	Won vacant WBO International super-middleweight title
52	Loss	46–6	Chris Eubank Jr.	UD	12	15 Jul 2017	The SSE Arena Wembley, London, England	For IBO super-middleweight title
51	Win	46–5	Robin Krasniqi	UD	12	22 Apr 2017	Messe, Erfurt, Germany	
50	Win	45–5	Tim-Robin Lihaug	TKO	8 (12), 1:09	16 Jul 2016	Max-Schmeling-Halle, Berlin, Germany	Won vacant WBO International super-middleweight title
49	Loss	44–5	Gilberto Ramírez	UD	12	9 Apr 2016	MGM Grand Garden Arena, Paradise, Nevada, US	Lost WBO super-middleweight title
48	Win	44–4	Martin Murray	SD	12	21 Nov 2015	TUI Arena, Hanover, Germany	Retained WBO super-middleweight title
47	Win	43–4	Robert Stieglitz	TKO	6 (12), 1:14	18 Jul 2015	Gerry Weber Stadion, Halle, Germany	Retained WBO super-middleweight title
46	Win	42–4	Paul Smith	UD	12	21 Feb 2015	O2 World, Berlin, Germany	Retained WBO super-middleweight title
45	Win	41–4	Paul Smith	UD	12	27 Sep 2014	Sparkassen-Arena, Kiel, Germany	Retained WBO super-middleweight title
44	Win	40–4	Nikola Sjekloća	UD	12	3 May 2014	Velodrom, Berlin, Germany	Retained WBO super-middleweight title
43	Win	39–4	Robert Stieglitz	SD	12	21 Mar 2014	GETEC Arena, Magdeburg, Germany	Won WBO super-middleweight title
42	Win	38–4	Giovanni De Carolis	UD	12	26 Oct 2013	Large EWE Arena, Oldenburg, Germany	Retained WBO Inter-Continental super-middleweight title
41	Win	37–4	Willbeforce Shihepo	UD	12	24 Aug 2013	Sport- und Kongresshalle, Schwerin, Germany	Won WBO Inter-Continental super-middleweight title
40	Loss	36–4	Robert Stieglitz	TKO	4 (12), 0:01	23 Mar 2013	GETEC Arena, Magdeburg, Germany	Lost WBO super-middleweight title
39	Win	36–3	Mehdi Bouadla	TKO	8 (12), 2:11	15 Dec 2012	Nüremberg Arena, Nüremberg, Germany	Retained WBO super-middleweight title
38	Win	35–3	Robert Stieglitz	UD	12	25 Aug 2012	O2 World, Berlin, Germany	Won WBO super-middleweight title
37	Win	34–3	Piotr Wilczewski	UD	12	31 Mar 2012	Sparkassen-Arena, Kiel, Germany	Retained WBO European super-middleweight title
36	Win	33–3	Pablo Farias	KO	5 (12), 2:00	14 Jan 2012	Baden-Arena, Offenburg, Germany	Won vacant WBO European super-middleweight title
35	Loss	32–3	Andre Ward	UD	12	14 May 2011	Home Depot Center, Carson, California, US	For WBA (Super) super-middleweight title; Super Six World Boxing Classic: semi-final
34	Win	32–2	Stjepan Božić	TKO	2 (10), 1:01	12 Feb 2011	RWE-Sporthalle, Mülheim, Germany	
33	Loss	31–2	Carl Froch	UD	12	27 Nov 2010	Hartwall Arena, Helsinki, Finland	For vacant WBC super-middleweight title; Super Six World Boxing Classic: group stage 3
32	Loss	31–1	Andre Dirrell	DQ	11 (12), 1:13	27 Mar 2010	Joe Louis Arena, Detroit, Michigan, US	Super Six World Boxing Classic: group stage 2; Abraham disqualified for hitting after a slip
31	Win	31–0	Jermain Taylor	KO	12 (12), 2:54	17 Oct 2009	O2 World, Berlin, Germany	Super Six World Boxing Classic: group stage 1
30	Win	30–0	Mahir Oral	TKO	10 (12), 1:23	27 Jun 2009	Max-Schmeling-Halle, Berlin, Germany	Retained IBF middleweight title
29	Win	29–0	Lajuan Simon	UD	12	14 Mar 2009	Ostseehalle, Kiel, Germany	Retained IBF middleweight title
28	Win	28–0	Raúl Márquez	RTD	6 (12), 3:00	8 Nov 2008	Jako Arena, Bamberg, Germany	Retained IBF middleweight title
27	Win	27–0	Edison Miranda	TKO	4 (12), 1:13	21 Jun 2008	Hard Rock Live, Hollywood, Florida, US	
26	Win	26–0	Elvin Ayala	KO	12 (12), 2:32	29 Mar 2008	Ostseehalle, Kiel, Germany	Retained IBF middleweight title
25	Win	25–0	Wayne Elcock	TKO	5 (12), 1:58	8 Dec 2007	St. Jakobshalle, Basel, Switzerland	Retained IBF middleweight title
24	Win	24–0	Khoren Gevor	KO	11 (12), 2:41	18 Aug 2007	Max-Schmeling-Halle, Berlin, Germany	Retained IBF middleweight title
23	Win	23–0	Sébastien Demers	KO	3 (12), 2:57	26 May 2007	Jako Arena, Bamberg, Germany	Retained IBF middleweight title
22	Win	22–0	Edison Miranda	UD	12	23 Sep 2006	Rittal Arena, Wetzlar, Germany	Retained IBF middleweight title
21	Win	21–0	Kofi Jantuah	UD	12	13 May 2006	Stadthalle, Zwickau, Germany	Retained IBF middleweight title
20	Win	20–0	Shannan Taylor	UD	12	4 Mar 2006	Large EWE Arena, Oldenburg, Germany	Retained IBF middleweight title
19	Win	19–0	Kingsley Ikeke	KO	5 (12), 1:36	10 Dec 2005	Arena Leipzig, Leipzig, Germany	Won vacant IBF middleweight title
18	Win	18–0	Luis Daniel Parada	TKO	5 (8), 2:52	1 Oct 2005	Large EWE Arena, Oldenburg, Germany	
17	Win	17–0	Howard Eastman	UD	12	16 Jul 2005	Nuremberg Arena, Nuremberg, Germany	Retained WBA Inter-Continental middleweight title
16	Win	16–0	Héctor Javier Velazco	KO	5 (12), 2:49	23 Apr 2005	Westfalenhallen, Dortmund, Germany	Retained WBA Inter-Continental middleweight title; Won vacant WBF (Federation) Intercontinental middleweight title
15	Win	15–0	Ian Gardner	UD	12	12 Feb 2005	Max-Schmeling-Halle, Berlin, Germany	Won vacant WBA Inter-Continental middleweight title
14	Win	14–0	Roberto Mario Vecchio	TKO	6 (8), 2:02	20 Nov 2004	BigBox, Kempten, Germany	
13	Win	13–0	Nader Hamdan	TKO	12 (12), 1:30	4 Sep 2004	Grugahalle, Essen, Germany	Won vacant WBA Inter-Continental middleweight title
12	Win	12–0	Dave Nash	KO	2 (8)	3 Jul 2004	Stadthalle, Hattersheim am Main, Germany	
11	Win	11–0	Mark Flynn	KO	3 (8), 2:41	5 Jun 2004	Eissportzentrum, Chemnitz, Germany	
10	Win	10–0	Cristian Oscar Zanabria	KO	5 (8)	17 Apr 2004	Max-Schmeling-Halle, Berlin, Germany	
9	Win	9–0	Branko Sobot	TKO	2 (8)	27 Mar 2004	Bördelandhalle, Magdeburg, Germany	
8	Win	8–0	Steve Walker	KO	2 (8)	28 Feb 2004	Mehrzweckhalle, Dresden, Germany	
7	Win	7–0	Gabriel Botos	TKO	2 (6), 1:22	21 Jan 2004	Sportcenter Jumps, Berlin, Germany	
6	Win	6–0	Alexandru Manea	TKO	3 (6)	17 Jan 2004	Rhein-Mosel-Halle, Koblenz, Germany	
5	Win	5–0	Cezary Piotrowski	KO	4 (6)	13 Dec 2003	Nuremberg Arena, Nuremberg, Germany	
4	Win	4–0	Tomas Vican	TKO	2 (6)	22 Nov 2003	Erdgas Arena, Riesa, Germany	
3	Win	3–0	Sladko Cizicz	TKO	3 (4)	4 Oct 2003	Stadthalle, Zwickau, Germany	
2	Win	2–0	Petr Rykala	TKO	2 (4)	6 Sep 2003	Messe, Erfurt, Germany	
1	Win	1–0	Frank Kary Roth	TKO	3 (4)	16 Aug 2003	Nürburgring, Nürburg, Germany	

== Titles in boxing ==
=== Major world titles ===
- IBF middleweight champion (160 lbs)
- WBO super-middleweight champion (168 lbs) (2x)

=== Regional/International titles ===
- WBA Inter-Continental middleweight champion (160 lbs)
- WBF (Federation) Intercontinental middleweight champion (160 lbs)
- WBO European super-middleweight champion (168 lbs)
- WBO Inter-Continental super-middleweight champion (168 lbs)
- WBO International super-middleweight champion (168 lbs) (2x)

== Viewership ==
=== Germany ===
Date	Fight	Viewership (avg.)	Source(s)
23 September 2006	Arthur Abraham vs. Edison Miranda	4,360,000	
18 August 2007	Arthur Abraham vs. Khoren Gevor	3,260,000	
8 December 2007	Arthur Abraham vs. Wayne Elcock	5,070,000	
29 March 2008	Arthur Abraham vs. Elvin Ayala	5,860,000	
21 June 2008	Arthur Abraham vs. Edison Miranda II	4,680,000	
8 November 2008	Arthur Abraham vs. Raúl Márquez	5,970,000	
14 March 2009	Arthur Abraham vs. Lajuan Simon	5,760,000	
25 June 2009	Arthur Abraham vs. Mahir Oral	5,410,000	
17 October 2009	Arthur Abraham vs. Jermain Taylor	6,020,000	
27 November 2010	Arthur Abraham vs. Carl Froch	5,010,000	
14 January 2012	Arthur Abraham vs. Pablo Farias	5,090,000	
31 March 2012	Arthur Abraham vs. Piotr Wilczewski	4,660,000	
25 August 2012	Arthur Abraham vs. Robert Stieglitz	4,920,000	
23 March 2013	Arthur Abraham vs. Robert Stieglitz II	4,200,000	
27 September 2014	Arthur Abraham vs. Paul Smith	3,400,000	
21 February 2015	Arthur Abraham vs. Paul Smith II	4,090,000	
18 July 2015	Arthur Abraham vs. Robert Stieglitz IV	3,610,000	
	Total viewership	81,370,000	

== Awards ==
- Hrant Shahinyan Medal
- 2009 Berlin Sportsman of the Year
- Child Award 2009

== See also ==
- List of middleweight boxing champions
- List of super-middleweight boxing champions
- List of IBF world champions
- List of WBO world champions

Sporting positions
Regional boxing titles
Vacant Title last held by Evans Ashira	WBA Inter-Continental middleweight champion 4 September 2004 – November 2004; Vacated	Vacant Title next held by Himself
Vacant Title last held by Himself	WBA Inter-Continental middleweight champion 12 February 2005 – October 2005; Vacated	Vacant Title next held by József Nagy
Vacant Title last held by Andy Halder	WBF (Federation) Intercontinental middleweight champion 23 April 2005 – June 2005; Vacated	Vacant Title next held by Andy Halder
Vacant Title last held by Mikkel Kessler	WBO European super-middleweight champion 14 January 2012 – 25 August 2012; Won world title	Vacant Title next held by Geard Ajetović
Vacant Title last held by Gilberto Ramírez	WBO International super-middleweight champion 16 July 2016 – April 2017; Vacated	Vacant Title next held by Himself
Vacant Title last held by Himself	WBO International super-middleweight champion 28 April 2018 – April 2019; Vacated	Vacant Title next held by Lerrone Richards
World boxing titles
Vacant Title last held by Jermain Taylor	IBF middleweight champion 10 December 2005 – 12 July 2009; Vacated	Vacant Title next held by Sebastian Sylvester
Preceded by Robert Stieglitz	WBO super-middleweight champion 25 August 2012 – 23 March 2013	Succeeded by Robert Stieglitz
Preceded by Robert Stieglitz	WBO super-middleweight champion 1 March 2014 – 9 April 2016	Succeeded by Gilberto Ramírez
