= Khoren Gevor =

Armenian boxer (born 1980)

Personal information
- Nationality: German
- Born: Khoren Gevorgyan; 16 March 1980 (age 46) Etchmiadzin, Armenian SSR, Soviet Union
- Height: 5 ft 8 1/2 in (1.74 m)
- Weight: Light-middleweight; Middleweight; Super-middleweight

Boxing career
- Stance: Southpaw

Boxing record
- Total fights: 46
- Wins: 35
- Win by KO: 17
- Losses: 11

Khoren Gevor (Armenian: Խորեն Գեվորգյան; born Khoren Gevorgyan on 16 March 1980) is an Armenian-born German professional boxer. He held the European middleweight title from 2008 to 2009, and challenged four times for a world title at middleweight and super-middleweight.

== Biography ==
Gevor was born on March 16, 1980, in Etchmiadzin, Armenia. He moved to Hamburg, Germany when he was 16 and currently fights out of there. He is known for his good technique and speed.

== Amateur career ==
Gevor started boxing at the age of 12. He had a very successful amateur career with 72 wins in 75 fights and won six national Armenian titles. He turned pro in 2000 and signed a contract with Universum Box Promotion. He is currently managed by Klaus-Peter Kohl.

== Professional career ==
Gevor won his first professional titles when, on December 3, 2005, he stopped Mexican Gustavo Magallanes in the eighth round and won the vacant IBF and WBO Inter-Continental middleweight titles. He defended both titles against Sergey Khomitsky before vacating them soon after.

Gevor fought against compatriot Arthur Abraham for the IBF Middleweight title on August 18, 2007. Gevor was defeated by an 11th-round knockout from a powerful left hook.

On November 28, 2008, Gevor beat Finn Amin Asikainen in his hometown of Helsinki by 7th-round knockout and won the European championship belt.

Gevor lost a controversial bout to WBA Middleweight Champion Felix Sturm by unanimous decision on July 11, 2009.

On April 9, 2011, Gevor fought WBO Super Middleweight Champion Robert Stieglitz in a very competitive brawl. Gevor received a cut over his left eye in round three. The fight got more dirty in round ten when, after referee Manfred Küchler deducted a point from Gevor, both fighters wrestled each other onto the canvas. Stieglitz emerged with a cut over his right eye and Gevor was disqualified by the referee. Angry, Gevor attacked Küchler and was removed by security.

Gevor fought Baker Barakat in a six-round bout on December 10, 2011. The whole fight was fairly even. As soon as Barakat was announced the winner by decision, Gevor turned to the referee and punched him in the face. Barakat and people from both corners tried to hold Gevor back. Later in the dressing rooms, the fighting continued and police had to be called in to break it up.

== Personal life ==
Gevor has with Nenel Gevorgyan two sons and a daughter. Both his sons are also boxers, fighting for a club in Hamburg, and have become Northern Germany champions. In his free time, Khoren enjoys radio-controlled cars and motor racing.

== Professional boxing record ==
46 fights	35 wins	11 losses
By knockout	17	2
By decision	16	8
By disqualification	2	1

No.	Result	Record	Opponent	Type	Round, time	Date	Location	Notes
46	Loss	35–11	Luka Plantić	UD	10	17 Dec 2022	Sportska Dvorana Bilankusa, Solin, Croatia	For vacant WBC Silver International super-middleweight title
45	Win	35–10	Lukasz Stanioch	TD	5 (10), 3:00	30 Sep 2022	Hala Sportowa BKS Stal, Bielsko-Biała, Poland	Split TD
44	Loss	34–10	Giovanni De Carolis	UD	12	21 Jun 2019	Parco della Pace, Rome, Italy	For WBC International super-middleweight title
43	Win	34–9	Dayron Lester	SD	8	17 Feb 2019	Große Freiheit 36, Hamburg, Germany	
42	Win	33–9	Viktor Polyakov	UD	8	8 Apr 2018	Große Freiheit 36, Hamburg, Germany	
41	Loss	32–9	Maxim Vlasov	UD	10	5 Nov 2012	Sports Palace Quant, Moscow, Russia	For WBC Baltic super-middleweight title
40	Loss	32–8	Baker Barakat	PTS	6	10 Dec 2011	Sommer-Rodelbahn, Mechernich, Germany	
39	Win	32–7	Olegs Fedotovs	TKO	6 (10)	3 Oct 2011	Theater Carré, Amsterdam, Netherlands	
38	Loss	31–7	Nikola Sjekloca	UD	12	15 Jul 2011	EWS Arena, Göppingen, Germany	For WBC International super-middleweight title
37	Loss	31–6	Robert Stieglitz	DQ	10 (12), 2:45	9 Apr 2011	Bördelandhalle, Magdeburg, Germany	For WBO super-middleweight title; Gevor disqualified for an intentional headbutt
36	Loss	31–5	Dimitri Sartison	UD	12	31 Jul 2010	O2 World, Hamburg, Germany	For WBA super-middleweight title
35	Win	31–4	Jeferson Luis Goncalo	UD	10	9 Jan 2010	Bördelandhalle, Magdeburg, Germany	
34	Loss	30–4	Felix Sturm	UD	12	11 Jul 2009	Nürburgring, Nürburg, Germany	For WBA middleweight title
33	Win	30–3	Amin Asikainen	TKO	7 (12), 2:24	28 Nov 2008	Hartwall Areena, Helsinki, Finland	Won vacant European middleweight title
32	Win	29–3	Samir Dos Santos Barbosa	UD	10	19 Apr 2008	Bördelandhalle, Magdeburg, Germany	
31	Win	28–3	Nicolas Perillo	DQ	7 (8), 1:59	30 Nov 2007	Dm-Arena, Karlsruhe, Germany	Perillo disqualified for repeated low blows
30	Loss	27–3	Arthur Abraham	KO	11 (12), 2:41	18 Aug 2007	Max-Schmeling-Halle, Berlin, Germany	For IBF middleweight title
29	Win	27–2	Rafael Sosa Pintos	UD	8	28 Apr 2007	König Pilsener Arena, Oberhausen, Germany	
28	Win	26–2	Edison Francisco Guedes	TKO	6 (10), 2:28	27 Feb 2007	Kugelbake-Halle, Cuxhaven, Germany	
27	Win	25–2	Andile Tshongolo	TKO	3 (10)	19 Sep 2006	Kugelbake-Halle, Cuxhaven, Germany	
26	Win	24–2	Sergey Khomitsky	UD	12	7 Mar 2006	Kugelbake-Halle, Cuxhaven, Germany	Retained IBF Inter-Continental and WBO Inter-Continental middleweight titles
25	Win	23–2	Gustavo Magallanes	TKO	8 (12), 1:05	3 Dec 2005	Bördelandhalle, Magdeburg, Germany	Won vacant IBF Inter-Continental and WBO Inter-Continental middleweight titles
24	Win	22–2	Franck Mezaache	TD	8 (10)	28 Jun 2005	Kugelbake-Halle, Cuxhaven, Germany	Unanimous TD
23	Win	21–2	Francesco Pernice	TKO	4 (8)	26 Mar 2005	Erdgas Arena, Riesa, Germany	
22	Win	20–2	Alexey Chirkov	UD	8	18 Jan 2005	Kugelbake-Halle, Cuxhaven, Germany	
21	Win	19–2	Ian McLeod	RTD	5 (8), 3:00	15 Aug 2004	State Sports Centre, Sydney, Australia	
20	Win	18–2	Sergey Tatevosyan	UD	8	18 May 2004	Hansehalle, Lübeck, Germany	
19	Win	17–2	Dmytro Hotovskyy	DQ	6 (6)	30 Mar 2004	Saaltheater Geulen, Aachen, Germany	
18	Win	16–2	Kai Kauramaki	KO	4 (8)	2 Mar 2004	Universum Gym, Hamburg, Germany	
17	Win	15–2	Ryszard Kraz	TKO	2 (6)	10 Jan 2004	Wismar, Germany	
16	Win	14–2	Adrian Sauca	UD	6	6 Sep 2003	Uj-Sporthall, Szeged, Hungary	
15	Win	13–2	Gyorgy Bugyik	PTS	6	6 Jul 2003	Avendi Hotel, Bad Honnef, Germany	
14	Win	12–2	Murad Makhmudov	SD	8	25 Apr 2003	Maritim Hotel, Magdeburg, Germany	
13	Loss	11–2	Lukáš Konečný	TKO	8 (10), 1:58	21 Dec 2002	Lausitz Arena, Brandenburg, Germany	For German International light-middleweight title
12	Loss	11–1	Lukáš Konečný	TD	7 (10)	21 Sep 2002	Bördelandhalle, Magdeburg, Germany	For German International light-middleweight title; Majority TD: Accidental clash of heads
11	Win	11–0	Ivan Vavrecan	TKO	3	29 Jun 2002	Marriott Hotel, Berlin, Germany	
10	Win	10–0	Eugenio Monteiro	PTS	6	6 Apr 2002	Universum Gym, Hamburg, Germany	
9	Win	9–0	Marek Marusak	KO	2 (6)	26 Jan 2002	Berlin, Germany	
8	Win	8–0	Marek Jesenic	KO	2 (6)	24 Nov 2001	Universum Gym, Hamburg, Germany	
7	Win	7–0	Tibor Horvath	KO	1	20 Oct 2001	Rathenauhalle, Berlin, Germany	
6	Win	6–0	Ivan Vavrecan	TKO	1	29 Sep 2001	Universum Gym, Hamburg, Germany	
5	Win	5–0	Peter Resour	PTS	6	28 Jul 2001	Estrel Convention Center, Berlin, Germany	
4	Win	4–0	Zsolt Gyalog	KO	1	7 Apr 2001	Universum Gym, Hamburg, Germany	
3	Win	3–0	Patrik Hruska	PTS	4	10 Feb 2001	Estrel Convention Center, Berlin, Germany	
2	Win	2–0	Milan Smetana	TKO	1	5 Dec 2000	Universum Gym, Hamburg, Germany	
1	Win	1–0	Zdenek Zubko	TKO	1	1 Oct 2000	Universum Gym, Hamburg, Germany	

== Boxing titles ==
- IBF Inter-Continental Middleweight Champion (2006)
- WBO Inter-Continental Middleweight Champion (2006)
- EBU European Middleweight Champion (2008)
