= Eric Mitchell (boxer) =

American boxer

Eric Mitchell (born August 25, 1969) is an American former professional boxer who competed from 1993 to 2015. Mitchell fought primarily in the middleweight division and appeared in several regional title over the course of his career.

Mitchell won the North American Boxing Association middleweight title in 2001 with a victory over former world title challenger Ross Thompson. He later faced a series of notable opponents in regional and international title contests. In 2003, he was defeated by future world champion Alejandro Berrio.

Between 2008 and 2012, Mitchell was challenged by many people including losses to Danny Perez Ramírez for the United States Boxing Association and North American Boxing Organization middleweight titles Joachim Alcine, Dmitry Pirog for the WBO Asia Pacific middleweight title, and Elvin Ayala for the WBC USNBC middleweight title.

Mitchell fought to a draw with former world title challenger Harry Joe Yorgey in 2014, and concluded his career in 2015 with a loss to Jarrett Hurd.
