= Alexander Awdijan =

Armenian boxer

Personal information
- Nickname: Alexander Awdijan
- Nationality: (Armenia) Armenian
- Born: Alichan Awdijan; June 27, 1977 (age 49) Armenian SSR, Soviet Union
- Height: 6 ft 3 in (191 cm)
- Weight: Super Middleweight

Boxing career

Boxing record
- Total fights: 20
- Wins: 18
- Win by KO: 7
- Losses: 1
- Draws: 1
- No contests: 0

Alexander Awdijan (born June 27, 1977) is an Armenian professional boxer. He was the GBU 2007 World Champion and the International German Champion of 2006.
