= Dimitri Sartison =

German boxer

Personal information
- Nationality: German
- Born: 4 February 1980 (age 46) Rudny, Kazakh SSR, Soviet Union
- Height: 1.77 m (5 ft 10 in)
- Weight: Super-middleweight

Boxing career
- Stance: Orthodox

Boxing record
- Total fights: 33
- Wins: 31
- Win by KO: 19
- Losses: 2

Dimitri Sartison (born 4 February 1980) is a German former professional boxer who competed from 2003 to 2013, and held the WBA (Regular) super-middleweight title from 2009 to 2011.

He was stripped of title after failing to defend the belt against Brian Magee and later Robert Stieglitz.

== Professional boxing record ==
33 fights	31 wins	2 losses
By knockout	19	2
By decision	12	0

No.	Result	Record	Opponent	Type	Round, time	Date	Location	Notes
33	Win	31–2	Baker Barakat	KO	2 (6), 1:13	24 Aug 2013	Warsteiner HockeyPark, Mönchengladbach, Germany	
32	Win	30–2	Artsiom Salomka	PTS	6	27 Jan 2013	Spprtcentrum Ben Mesters, Heerlen, Netherlands	
31	Loss	29–2	Károly Balzsay	TKO	12 (12), 2:25	21 Apr 2012	Sport- und Kongresshalle, Schwerin, Germany	For WBA (Regular) super middleweight title
30	Win	29–1	Carlos Caicedo	KO	5 (8), 1:23	11 Feb 2012	Boxsporthalle Braakamp, Hamburg, Germany	
29	Win	28–1	Artūrs Kulikauskis	MD	8	12 Nov 2011	Bulle de Gerardchamps, Verviers, Belgium	
28	Win	27–1	Khoren Gevor	UD	12	31 Jul 2010	O2 World, Hamburg, Germany	Retained WBA (Regular) super middleweight title
27	Win	26–1	Stjepan Božić	RTD	5 (12), 3:00	21 Nov 2009	Sparkassen-Arena, Kiel, Germany	Won vacant WBA (Regular) super middleweight title
26	Win	25–1	Michael Bilak	TKO	3 (8), 0:54	22 Aug 2009	SYMA Sport and Leisure Centre, Budapest, Hungary	
25	Win	24–1	Vasily Andriyanov	UD	8	10 Jan 2009	Bordelandhalle, Magdeburg, Germany	
24	Win	23–1	Edisson Francisco Guedes	TKO	3 (8), 1:39	15 Nov 2008	Burg-Waechter Castello, Düsseldorf, Germany	
23	Loss	22–1	Mikkel Kessler	KO	12 (12), 2:00	21 Jun 2008	Brøndby Hallen, Brøndby, Denmark	For vacant WBA (Regular) super middleweight title
22	Win	22–0	Pablo Daniel Nievas	TKO	8 (10), 1:46	23 Feb 2008	Brandberge Arena, Halle, Germany	
21	Win	21–0	Gusmyr Perdomo	UD	10	7 Sep 2007	Burg-Waechter Castello, Düsseldorf, Germany	
20	Win	20–0	Mike Algoet	UD	8	16 Jun 2007	SYMA Sport and Leisure Centre, Budapest, Hungary	
19	Win	19–0	Jevgēņijs Andrejevs	UD	10	18 Nov 2006	Burg-Waechter Castello, Düsseldorf, Germany	
18	Win	18–0	Paul David	TKO	5 (8), 1:55	19 Sep 2006	Kugelbake-Halle, Cuxhaven, Germany	
17	Win	17–0	Uladzimir Sazonau	KO	4 (8), 2:18	26 Jul 2006	Sportschule Sachsenwald, Hamburg, Germany	
16	Win	16–0	Michal Bilak	TKO	7 (8), 1:29	9 Mag 2006	Sazka Arena, Prague, Czech Republic	
15	Win	15–0	Andy Halder	KO	5 (8), 1:27	28 Feb 2006	Alte Reithalle, Stuttgart, Germany	
14	Win	14–0	Osmar Luiz Teixeira	KO	3 (6), 0:44	7 Jan 2006	Zenith - Die Kulturhalle, Munich, Germany	
13	Wim	13–0	Sergey Kharchenko	UD	8	10 Sep 2005	Dm-Arena, Karlsruhe, Germany	
12	Win	12–0	Roberto Martins	TKO	2 (8), 2:13	7 May 2005	Volkswagenhalle, Braunschweig, Germany	
11	Win	11–0	Mukadi Manda	UD	10	29 Mar 2005	Sporthalle, Hamburg, Germany	
10	Win	10–0	Andrzej Butowicz	TKO	7 (8)	16 Nov 2004	Kugelbake-Halle, Cuxhaven, Germany	
9	Win	9–0	Roland Horváth	TKO	2 (6), 1:05	26 Oct 2004	Scandlines Arena, Rostock, Germany	
8	Win	8–0	Peter Krajčovič	UD	4	22 Jun 2004	Sportzentrum, Telfs, Austria	
7	Wim	7–0	Joseph Sjvijus	TKO	2 (6)	4 Jun 2004	Eissporthalle, Halle, Germany	
6	Win	6–0	Roman Vanicky	TKO	4 (4)	18 May 2004	Hansehalle, Lübeck, Germany	
5	Win	5–0	Frank Kary Roth	KO	3 (4)	2 Mar 2004	Universum Gym, Hamburg, Germany	
4	Win	4–0	Csaba Balatoni	UD	4	17 Feb 2004	Hansehalle, Lübeck, Germany	
3	Win	3–0	Gabriel Botos	TKO	3 (4)	13 Dec 2003	Okrąglak Halle, Opole, Poland	
2	Win	2–0	Ramdane Kaouane	KO	3 (4)	18 Nov 2003	Universum Gym, Hamburg, Germany	
1	Win	1–0	Miroslav Kvocka	UD	4	23 Sep 2003	Universum Gym, Hamburg, Germany	

Sporting positions
World boxing titles
Vacant Title last held by Mikkel Kessler	WBA (Regular) super middleweight champion 21 November 2009 – 15 July 2011; Stripped	Vacant Title next held by Károly Balzsay
