= Branko Sobot =

Croatian boxer

Branko Šobot
Personal information
- Nickname: Pit bull
- Nationality: Croatian
- Born: Branko Šobot; 12 January 1972 (age 54) Zagreb, Croatia
- Height: 5 ft 10 in (1.78 m)
- Weight: Middleweight, Super Middleweight

Boxing career
- Stance: Southpaw

Boxing record
- Total fights: 30
- Wins: 19
- Win by KO: 10
- Losses: 11
- Draws: 0
- No contests: 0

Branko Šobot (born 12 January 1972 in Zagreb, Croatia) is a Croatian former professional boxer, who held the IBF Inter-Continental middleweight and super middleweight titles and challenged for the WBO World Super middleweight title, losing against Joe Calzaghe by 3rd-round TKO.

== Amateur ==
Šobot became Croatian amateur champion in 1994 defeating Stjepan Božić by split decision.

== Pro ==
Šobot's debut came on January 7, 1995, with a knockout of Bosnian, Savo Janković. On 1 March 1996, Šobot fought and defeated Orhan Ajvazoski for the German International middleweight title in Frankfurt and went on to make two more successful defences in the city and later two more in Offenbach and Oberhausen. After nine wins, Šobot successfully fought for the IBF Inter-Continental middleweight title, defeating experienced title holder Salvador Yanez.

Šobot's next major challenge came on January 25, 1997, when he faced future world champion Hacine Cherifi for the EBU (European) middleweight title. After a 12-round fight, the Frenchman defeated Šobot on points, Šobots only defeat after 11 wins.

On the January 24, 1998, Šobot made his first and only World title challenge. Moving up to Super Middleweight, he faced Joe Calzaghe who was making his first defence since winning the WBO World super middleweight title off Chris Eubank. Šobot was brought in as a late replacement for American Tarick Salmaci. Despite beating the count after getting knocked down in the third round, the Croatian came under renewed punishment, with the Welshman landing blows from all angles, prompting the referee to stop the fight, making it Šobot's first TKO loss.

In November 1999, after two recovery wins back in Germany, Šobot faced unbeaten Mario Veit for the vacant German International super middleweight title, losing the ten round contest by unanimous decision.

His next fight was more successful, as he won the IBF Inter-Continental super middleweight title in his home country with a sixth round stoppage over Francis Fofoh. This took his career record up to 17-3-0 at the turn of the millennium, although the rest of his career would be less victory filled. In his next nine fights he would win just twice, facing tough competition against the likes of Danilo Haussler, Arthur Abraham, Mger Mkrtchyan and Konni Konrad.

On the 16 December 2004, Šobot fought his last bout, losing to undefeated and future WBO World super middleweight champion Denis Inkin by second-round TKO.

== Professional boxing record ==
30 fights	19 wins	11 losses
By knockout	10	4
By decision	9	7

No.	Result	Record	Opponent	Type	Round, time	Date	Location	Notes
30	Loss	19–11	Denis Inkin	TKO	2 (8)	16 Dec 2004	Centr na Tulskoy, Moscow, Russia	
29	Loss	19–10	Lansana Diallo	UD	8	4 Dec 2004	Palais du Midi, Brussels, Belgium	
28	Win	19–9	Admir Kurtić	KO	2 (6)	7 Nov 2004	Široki Brijeg, West Herzegovina, Bosnia and Herzegovina	
27	Loss	18–9	Konni Konrad	MD	8	16 Oct 2004	Maritim Hotel, Cologne, Germany	
26	Loss	18–8	Roman Aramyan	PTS	6	25 Sep 2004	Ballei-Halle, Neckarsulm, Germany	
25	Loss	18–7	Mger Mkrtchyan	TKO	2 (8), 2:21	24 Jul 2004	Brandenburg Halle, Frankfurt an der Oder, Germany	
24	Loss	18–6	Arthur Abraham	TKO	2 (8), 2:05	27 Mar 2004	Bordelandhalle, Magdeburg, Germany	
23	Win	18–5	Orhan Ajvazoski	UD	6	29 Sep 2001	Stadthalle, Offenbach am Main, Germany	
22	Loss	17–5	Danilo Häussler	UD	8	6 May 2000	Ballsporthalle, Frankfurt, Germany	
21	Loss	17–4	Norbert Nieroba	PTS	8	25 Sep 1999	Kölnarena, Cologne, Germany	
20	Win	17–3	Francis Fofoh	TKO	6 (12)	10 Jul 1999	Amphitheater Arena, Pula, Croatia	Won vacant IBF Inter-Continental super middleweight title
19	Loss	16–3	Mario Veit	UD	10	14 Nov 1998	Circus Krone, Munich, Germany	For vacant German International super middleweight title
18	Win	16–2	Rob Bleakley	UD	8	22 Aug 1998	Sport und Erholungszentrum, Berlin, Germany	
17	Win	15–2	Terry Ford	PTS	8	5 Jun 1998	Sporthalle Wandsbek, Hamburg, Germany	
16	Loss	14–2	Joe Calzaghe	TKO	3 (12), 1:35	24 Jan 1998	Cardiff International Arena, Cardiff, Wales	For WBO super middleweight title
15	Win	14–1	Bahre Ahmeti	UD	10	6 Dec 1997	Stadthalle, Offenbach am Main, Germany	Retained German International middleweight title
14	Win	13–1	Anthony Ivory	PTS	8	23 Aug 1997	Maritim Hotel, Stuttgart, Germany	
13	Win	12–1	Bagrat Makhkamov	TKO	6 (10)	13 Jun 1997	Arena Oberhausen, Oberhausen, Germany	Won vacant German International middleweight title
12	Loss	11–1	Hacine Cherifi	UD	12	25 Jan 1997	Maritim Hotel, Stuttgart, Germany	For European middleweight title
11	Win	11–0	Milko Stoikov	TKO	3 (8)	21 Dec 1996	Zoo-Gesellschaftshaus, Frankfurt, Germany	
10	Win	10–0	Salvador Yáñez	TKO	10 (12)	19 Oct 1996	Zoo-Gesellschaftshaus, Frankfurt, Germany	Won vacant IBF Inter-Continental middleweight title
9	Win	9–0	Stefan Magyar	TKO	2 (8)	17 Aug 1996	Zoo-Gesellschaftshaus, Frankfurt, Germany	
8	Win	8–0	Orhan Ajvazoski	PTS	10	6 Jul 1996	Zoo-Gesellschaftshaus, Frankfurt, Germany	Retained German International middleweight title
7	Win	7–0	Horace Fleary	UD	10	4 May 1996	Zoo-Gesellschaftshaus, Frankfurt, Germany	Retained German International middleweight title
6	Win	6–0	Orhan Ajvazoski	PTS	10	1 Mar 1996	Zoo-Gesellschaftshaus, Frankfurt, Germany	Won vacant German International middleweight title
5	Win	5–0	Milan Masný	KO	3 (8), 2:10	8 Sep 1995	Zoo-Gesellschaftshaus, Frankfurt, Germany	
4	Win	4–0	Ibrahim Alpasaln	TKO	5 (6)	8 Jul 1995	Zoo-Gesellschaftshaus, Frankfurt, Germany	
3	Win	3–0	Isidore Janvier	TKO	4 (4)	6 May 1995	Neuwied, Rhineland-Palatinate, Germany	
2	Win	2–0	Jan Heinemann	UD	4	11 Feb 1995	Festhalle, Frankfurt, Germany	
1	Win	1–0	Savo Janković	KO	1 (4)	7 Jan 1995	Neuwied, Rhineland-Palatinate, Germany	
