= Joe Calzaghe =

Welsh boxer (born 1972)

Joe Calzaghe CBE
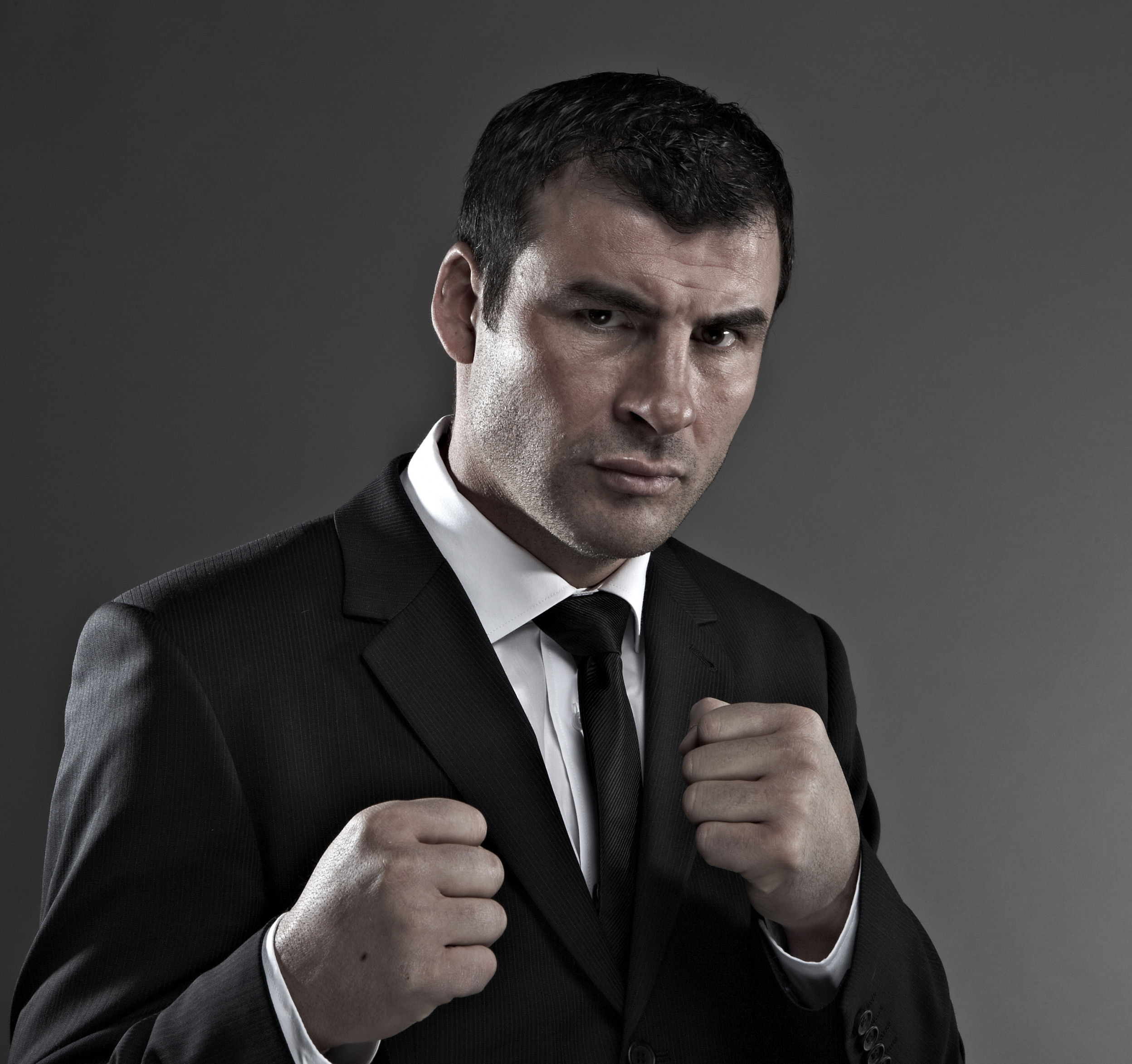
- Calzaghe in 2007

Personal information
- Nicknames: The Pride of Wales; The Italian Dragon
- Nationality: Welsh
- Born: Joseph William Calzaghe; 23 March 1972 (age 54) Hammersmith, London, England
- Height: 6 ft 0 in (183 cm)
- Weight: Super-middleweight; Light-heavyweight
- Father: Enzo Calzaghe

Boxing career
- Reach: 73 in (185 cm)
- Stance: Southpaw

Boxing record
- Total fights: 46
- Wins: 46
- Win by KO: 32
Medal record
Men's amateur boxing
Representing Wales
ABA Championships
Gold medal – first place	1991 London	Welterweight

Joseph William Calzaghe CBE (/kælˈzæɡi/ kal-ZA-gee; born 23 March 1972) is a Welsh former professional boxer who competed from 1993 to 2008. He held multiple world championships in two weight classes, including unified and lineal titles at super-middleweight, and the Ring magazine light-heavyweight title.

Calzaghe is the longest reigning super middleweight world champion in boxing history, having held the World Boxing Organization (WBO) title for over 10 years and defending it against 20 opponents (a record in the division, shared with Sven Ottke) before moving up to light-heavyweight. As his super-middleweight and light-heavyweight reigns overlapped, he retired with the longest continual time as world champion of any active boxer at the time. Calzaghe was the first boxer to unify three of the four major world titles (World Boxing Association, World Boxing Council, and WBO) at super-middleweight, and was the inaugural Ring champion in that weight class.

Between 2006 and 2008, Calzaghe was ranked by The Ring as one of the world's top ten active boxers, pound for pound, reaching a peak ranking of third in January 2009. He retired in February 2009 with an undefeated record of 46 wins, and as a reigning world champion. As of December 2024, BoxRec ranks Calzaghe as the 37th greatest fighter of all time, pound for pound, as well as the second-greatest European boxer of all time.

In 2007, Calzaghe won the BBC Sports Personality of the Year Award, making him the first Welsh winner of this award since David Broome in 1960. Calzaghe was inducted into the International Boxing Hall of Fame in 2014. He was nicknamed the "Pride of Wales" and the "Italian Dragon".

== Biography ==
Calzaghe was born in London to an Italian father, Enzo, from Sardinia, and a Welsh mother, Jackie. His paternal grandparents settled in the United Kingdom after the Second World War, during which his grandfather Giuseppe had served in the 12th Infantry Division Sassari, but had returned to live in Italy by the end of the 1950s. Calzaghe's father worked several jobs as a teenager in Italy, including as a barman, a chef, and a cleaner, before travelling Europe as a busker. He eventually arrived back in Britain to visit family in Bournemouth. It was during this time that Calzaghe's parents met; his mother hailed from the mining town of Markham, Caerphilly. The couple married, and briefly moved to Sardinia, but returned shortly after when Calzaghe's mother became homesick. They settled in London, his father working two jobs in a factory and a bed and breakfast while his mother worked as a secretary in the offices of production company 20th Century Fox.

Calzaghe was born in Hammersmith Hospital in March 1972, before his father decided to move the family back to Sardinia at the end of the year, living in his grandfather's home in Bancali. However, his mother again pushed to return to the United Kingdom and the family lived with his maternal grandmother in Markham for three years before they moved into their own home on a council estate in Pentwynmawr, near the town of Newbridge, in Caerphilly County Borough, Wales. He attended the local school, Pentwynmawr Primary, along with his two sisters, Melissa and Sonia, and developed a keen interest in playing football. He joined Pentwynmawr F.C. at under-10s level, playing as a midfielder and scored consistently during his early years.

At the age of eight, he was given a children's boxing toy that developed his interest in the sport and his father made a punching bag from an old carpet. He joined his first boxing club, Newbridge Amateur Boxing Club at ten years old and the sport quickly took priority for the young Calzaghe as he gave up playing football after two years. Calzaghe moved on to Oakdale Comprehensive School at 11, but was targeted by bullies as a teenager, becoming the target of regular verbal abuse that left him isolated. Although the culprits left him alone after a year, Calzaghe later admitted that he "never recovered from the abuse" and left school without sitting any of his GCSEs.

Calzaghe was the first person to be awarded the Freedom of Caerphilly County Borough, in 2009.

Already an MBE, he was elevated to CBE in the 2008 Queen's Birthday Honours.

== Amateur career ==
In 120 amateur contests, Calzaghe won four schoolboy ABA titles, followed by three consecutive senior British ABA titles (British Championships) between 1990 and 1993, which were won in three different weight categories, welterweight, light middleweight and middleweight. He reportedly had an amateur record of 110–10. Calzaghe received his last two defeats in a boxing ring at the hands of Michael Smyth in the 1990 Welsh ABA Final, and against Romanian amateur Adrian Preda at the 1990 European Junior Championships in Prague.

== Professional career ==
=== Super-middleweight ===
In September 1993, Calzaghe was signed up and made his professional debut at Cardiff Arms Park on the Lennox Lewis vs. Frank Bruno bill the following month, halting 23 fight veteran Paul Hanlon in one round. By September 1995, Calzaghe had won thirteen out of thirteen fights, including seven in the first round and two in the second, including quickfire victories over the highly experienced American duo of Frank Minton and Robert Curry, with only the fully fledged British Light Heavyweight Bobbie Joe Edwards lasting the distance.

In October 1995, Calzaghe won the vacant British super-middleweight title, stopping the previously unbeaten Stephen Wilson in the eighth round.

At the end of 1995, Calzaghe was voted Young Boxer of the Year by the Professional Boxing Association and the Boxing Writers' Club, with Barry McGuigan top tipping Calzaghe for 1996: "He punches ferociously, moves superbly and has the best of the European technique and US aggression."

After beginning 1996 with two more quick knockouts over Guy Stanford and Anthony Brooks, he successfully defended his British title with an easier-than-expected fifth round stoppage of the tough undefeated puncher Mark Delaney (21–0). Despite Delaney being a good fighter in his own right, Calzaghe's critics said that he had still not really been tested. Calzaghe said in reply that he could only beat whoever was out there and prepared to fight him. Calzaghe rounded off the year with victories over two experienced opponents in Warren Stowe and Pat Lawlor.

In November 1996, Calzaghe moved to Frank Warren's stable. Warren, who had managed Nigel Benn for his first twenty fights, declared: "Joe Calzaghe is a far better prospect, in fact he is my fighter for the new millennium." Calzaghe continued his winning ways in 1997, defeating Carlos Christie, the unbeaten Tyler Hughes and the 45–2 Luciano Torres. Meanwhile, Warren spent the summer of 1997 chasing a fight for Calzaghe with either WBC Champion Robin Reid or Irish WBO Champion Steve Collins. The fight with Collins was arranged, but at a late stage Collins withdrew because of injury, was stripped of his title, and then retired.

==== WBO super-middleweight champion ====
After Collins retired, a fight against British boxing legend Chris Eubank was quickly set up for the vacant WBO title on 11 October 1997, in Sheffield. Calzaghe emerged victorious over the two-time WBO champion, knocking the granite chinned Eubank down in the opening seconds and claiming a unanimous points win. The judges scored the contest 118–110, 118–109, and 116–111 in favour of Calzaghe. Eubank said of Calzaghe in a 2006 interview that: "Joe is the proper article, a true warrior." Calzaghe conceded that Eubank, even in his comeback, gave him the toughest fight of his life. His popularity grew alongside the wider cultural movement of Cool Cymru, and Calzaghe was symbolic of the new Welsh identity which was forming.

In 1998, he defended his title against Branko Sobot (winning by technical knockout in 3 rounds). Sobot was a late replacement for Syrian-American Tarick Salmaci, who pulled out after a row with his management. Sobot was knocked down in the third round. He beat the count but immediately came under renewed punishment from Calzaghe, forcing the referee to step in at 1:35 of the third round.

Calzaghe then went on to defeat perennial contender Juan Carlos Gimenez Ferreyra (TKO after 9 rounds), a former opponent of both Nigel Benn and Chris Eubank. Calzaghe became the first boxer to stop Gimenez Ferreyra, something which Benn, Eubank and Roberto Durán had failed to do in the past.

In 1999, Calzaghe started out by fighting his domestic rival, Robin Reid. Calzaghe was bitter that Reid had refused to face him whilst holding the WBC Championship in a unification bout and vowed to beat him, while Reid vowed to upset the odds by defeating Calzaghe and becoming a world champion again. After four rounds of the fight, Calzaghe seemed in total control and on his way to a comfortable victory, but then Reid won the next couple of rounds and it became a highly competitive fight thereafter with around five close rounds by the end of the fight that could have been scored either way, or even. Reid was also docked a point by the referee in the eighth round after a fifth warning for rabbit punches and low blows. It was arguably the closest that Calzaghe came to losing in his entire professional boxing career. After twelve rounds, the judges scored the fight for Calzaghe via a split decision (two judges scored it 116–111 for Calzaghe, while the other judge scored it 116–111 for Reid). Reid was never given the opportunity of a rematch. Calzaghe badly bruised his hand during the fight and according to Calzaghe, he suffered a dose of food poisoning. Calzaghe finished the year with another points win against Australian Rick Thornberry, where he broke his hand in the third round after looking like overwhelming his opponent early.

2000 started with another points decision against fellow Briton David Starie, in what was a dull fight that had a lot of holding and with the boxers' respective styles never gelling. This was followed by impressive wins against Omar Sheika (who was coming off a win over Glen Johnson) by fifth-round stoppage, and a TKO over former WBC world champion and close friend Richie Woodhall in ten competitive rounds, in what turned out to be Woodhall's last fight.

2001 started with an impressive first-round-stoppage win over the unbeaten German No 1 contender Mario Veit (30–0), followed by a win against American contender Will McIntyre on the Mike Tyson–Brian Nielsen undercard in Copenhagen Denmark, marking his first defence outside Britain. Calzaghe dropped him in the third round with a ferocious left uppercut, although McIntyre managed to survive the count. But the end was near. Calzaghe dropped McIntyre again at the start of the fourth, and this time the referee stopped the proceedings.

2002 started with unanimous points wins against former IBF world champion Charles Brewer of the United States in Cardiff, followed by a shutout 12-round unanimous decision over Miguel Angel Jimenez (120–107 for Calzaghe on all three judges' scorecards), and then a quick second round TKO of American Tocker Pudwill, who took the fight at very short notice as a replacement for the injured Thomas Tate, in Newcastle in December. With the win over Pudwill, Calzaghe successfully defended his WBO super-middleweight title for the 12th time. After the fight, Calzaghe said: "I'm one of the best pound-for-pound fighters in the world. I want to be remembered as one of the best British boxers ever."

Calzaghe's only fight of 2003 was in June against another former world champion, in the shape of American Byron Mitchell at the Cardiff International Arena. Calzaghe won by TKO in the second. Calzaghe suffered his first career knockdown in the second round, before rising to halt Mitchell in the very same round, thus becoming the first boxer to stop Mitchell.

2004 started out with a defence against Armenian contender Mger Mkrtchian in Cardiff where he won easily by a seventh-round knockout, followed by a points win over Egyptian-American Kabary Salem in Edinburgh in October, during which Calzaghe was briefly knocked down in the fourth round by a right hand. However, Calzaghe was not hurt, and he dominated the fight and knocked Salem down in the 12th round, winning comfortably on all three scorecards, 116–109, 117–109 and 118–107.

Mario Veit worked his way to a rematch against Calzaghe in Braunschweig, Germany, in July 2005, marking Calzaghe's second defence on foreign soil. Calzaghe beat Veit by technical knockout in the sixth round. On 10 September 2005, Calzaghe fought the Kenya boxer Evans Ashira and won by a comfortable unanimous decision over the former Middleweight title challenger, despite breaking his left hand in the third round. Calzaghe fought on one-handed winning 120–108, 120–108, 120–107.

==== Unified super-middleweight champion ====
His scheduled unification bout with IBF super-middleweight champion Jeff Lacy for 4 November 2005 was initially cancelled due to the break sustained to the metacarpal in his left hand. Warren successfully rescheduled it for 5 March 2006, and the match was won by an easy unanimous points decision over Lacy, who was a pre-fight favourite with the bookmakers and American pundits alike. Calzaghe dominated throughout the fight, with British fight fans chanting "easy" at the American during the last three rounds. Calzaghe gained the IBF title and won every round despite a point being deducted in the 11th for an illegal behind the body punch. He also won the vacant The Ring and lineal titles, becoming the first super-middleweight to be recognized as world champion by The Ring magazine.

On 14 October 2006, Calzaghe faced the rugged contender and future WBC super-middleweight champion Sakio Bika. Two points were deducted from Bika for head butts, one of which led to a severe cut over Calzaghe's left eye which would cause him problems for the duration of the bout. However, Calzaghe won the fight by clear decision to continue his undefeated run.

On 27 November 2006, it was announced that Calzaghe had signed a contract to defend his WBO super-middleweight title against former star of The Contender Peter Manfredo Jr. of the United States on 7 April 2007, at Millennium Stadium in Cardiff, Wales, to be shown on HBO. Because HBO did not want to cover a fight with the non-American mandatory IBF challenger Robert Stieglitz of Germany, and with the opportunity to fight World Middleweight champion Jermain Taylor in the summer if he won against Manfredo, Calzaghe chose to fight Manfredo and as a result had to relinquish the IBF super-middleweight championship. Both Calzaghe and Warren claimed that, "Stieglitz doesn't mean anything outside Germany." Stieglitz went on to fight Alejandro Berrio for the vacant IBF title, losing in 3 rounds. Berrio in turn lost the title to Lucian Bute in his first defense.

On 7 April 2007, Calzaghe met Peter Manfredo Jr. in front of 35,000 fans in Cardiff, Wales. Calzaghe was victorious on a third-round stoppage, unleashing a flurry of punches on the outclassed Manfredo, who threw nothing in return, thus drawing a stoppage from the referee. Manfredo and some American commentators called the stoppage premature because Manfredo did not appear hurt. HBO's ringside announcers declared that the stoppage was "way too quick." Trainer Emanuel Steward did contend that Calzaghe was clearly on his way to victory, but the stoppage was no fault of his own.

==== Calzaghe vs. Kessler ====
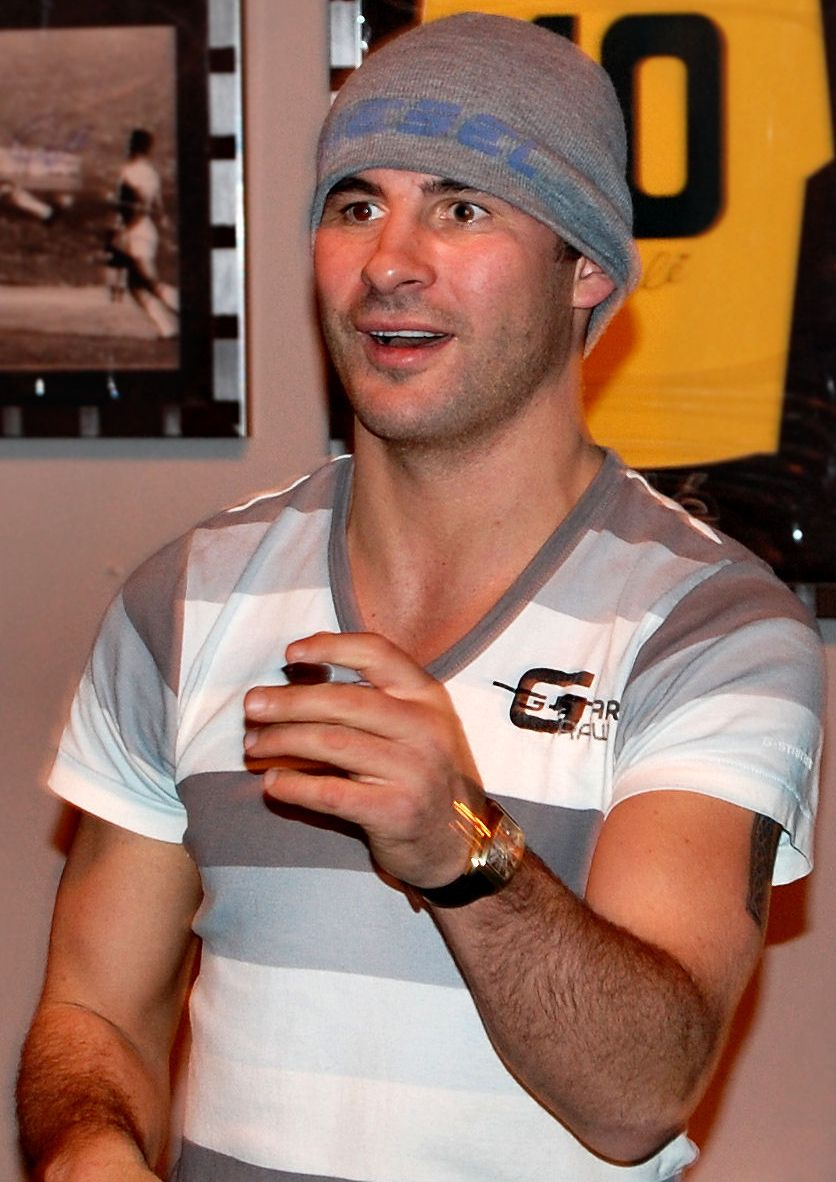
Calzaghe in 2007

In May 2007, Frank Warren released details to BBC Radio 5 Live and on his website that Calzaghe had accepted Mogens Palle's offer of $5 million to fight undefeated WBA & WBC world champion Mikkel Kessler. The bout took place at Cardiff's Millennium Stadium on 4 November. The fight was a unification bout for the WBO, The Ring, WBA (Undisputed) and WBC super-middleweight titles. Calzaghe won by unanimous decision, surpassing the 20 defences made by Bernard Hopkins and Larry Holmes at middleweight and heavyweight respectively. Only former heavyweight champion Joe Louis (with 25 defences), former light heavyweight champion Dariusz Michalczewski (23 defences), former minimumweight champion Ricardo López (23 defences), and former heavyweight champion Wladimir Klitschko (23 defences) have made more title defences.

Calzaghe was frequently described as undisputed champion, but since he had relinquished the IBF title, others argued that this was not strictly accurate. Reuters called him the "Undisputed King" of the division, while David A Avila said he was "the true undisputed world champion. Forget about the IBF titleholder Alejandro Berrio. That's really Calzaghe's belt too." The WBA describes an "Undisputed Champion" as one who holds any two of the WBA, WBC, IBF and WBO titles; which Calzaghe did after beating Kessler and had earlier done after beating Lacy.

=== Light-heavyweight ===
==== Calzaghe vs. Hopkins ====
On 19 April 2008, at the Thomas & Mack Center in Las Vegas, Calzaghe defeated Bernard Hopkins to win The Ring Light Heavyweight Championship by a split decision in his first ever fight in the United States.

Calzaghe did not get off to a good start. In the first round, Hopkins struck him with a right hand, knocking him down. As the rounds went on, Calzaghe continued to push the pace and began to get his rhythm going by landing combinations at close range. Hopkins' key weapon was his right hand, but after a few rounds Calzaghe could see the right hands coming and easily blocked the shots whilst Hopkins gradually tired. According to CompuBox, Calzaghe landed more punches on Hopkins than any of his previous opponents. Calzaghe also outlanded Hopkins in both total punches and power punches in each round of the fight. American Judges Chuck Giampa (116–111) and Ted Gimza (115–112) scored the fight clearly for Calzaghe, while judge Adalaide Byrd (114–113) scored the fight narrowly for Hopkins. HBO's unofficial ringside judge Harold Lederman scored the bout 116–111 for Calzaghe.

Hopkins was upset with the official decision and said that he was robbed of a clear points win. Hopkins said, "I just really feel like I took the guy to school. I feel like I made him fight my fight, not his. I wanted him to run into my shots. I think I made him do that, and I think I made it look pretty easy. I think I controlled the pace, and I controlled the fight." He has also openly stated that he wanted a rematch with Calzaghe.

Calzaghe said: "It was one of the toughest fights of my career. ... He is very clever. He was so awkward. It wasn't pretty, but I won the fight. ... It wasn't my best night, but I know I won."

"The first four rounds, and after that Calzaghe got in his groove, much like he did when he fought Mikkel Kessler, and from that point on it was Calzaghe. And Calzaghe didn't fight as good a fight as he could've fought, and he still won decisively," Emanuel Steward said at ringside.

==== Calzaghe vs. Jones Jr. ====
Calzaghe split with promoter Frank Warren in June 2008 and announced that he would promote his fights personally for the remainder of his career. The split caused Warren to launch a court case against Calzaghe, claiming that a verbal promise to promote the Roy Jones Jr. fight was broken and that Calzaghe owed him $1.4 million; Calzaghe in turn claimed that Warren owed him past fees. In March 2009 the High Court ruled that Warren had persuaded Calzaghe to sign contracts under duress when Calzaghe was hungry and dehydrated preparing for matches and that Warren's company Sports Network Limited owed Calzaghe $2.8 million in unpaid fees.

On 8 July 2008, after Calzaghe's split from Frank Warren, it was officially announced that the 39-year-old, Roy Jones Jr., and 36-year-old Joe Calzaghe had reached an agreement to fight for The Ring Light Heavyweight Championship in New York City at Madison Square Garden on 20 September 2008 on HBO PPV. Jones was on the comeback trail, and coming off a win over Félix Trinidad. After Calzaghe injured his right hand in training, the fight was postponed, with 8 November being set as the new date. Calzaghe was put down in the first round. Two close rounds followed before Calzaghe took control of the fight. In the eighth round, Jones sustained a cut over an eye, nearly forcing a stoppage. All three judges' decisions were 118–109 for Calzaghe.

=== Retirement ===
On 5 February 2009, Joe Calzaghe announced his retirement from professional boxing. He finished his career with a record of 46 wins and no losses, and becoming one of only fifteen world champions (to date) to retire as an undefeated world champion. After his retirement, fellow boxer and friend, Ricky Hatton described him as "the best British fighter we've ever had."

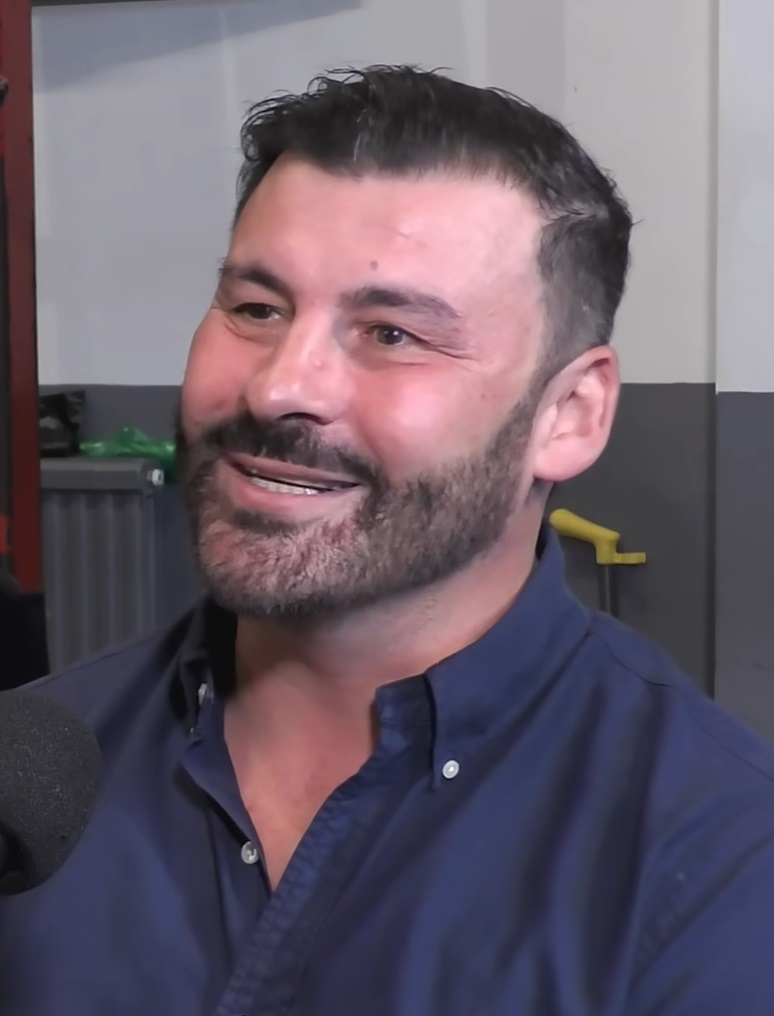
Calzaghe in 2021

As of May 2023, BoxRec rates Calzaghe as the second greatest European boxer, pound for pound, of all time, behind Duilio Loi.

== Life after boxing ==
Following his retirement from boxing, Calzaghe started his own boxing promotion company, Calzaghe Promotions, with his father Enzo Calzaghe.

In an interview with GMTV, Calzaghe stated he is promoting the Beat Bullying campaign. He is said to have found the inspiration from being a victim of bullying himself when he was young, saying he got bullied because of his small stature.

Calzaghe won the 2010 Soccer Aid, a British charity football match with the Rest of the World team beating England. Calzaghe scored the Rest of the World team's first goal. The game was tied after full-time but the Rest of the World won on penalties.

In 2012, Calzaghe made a cameo appearance as himself in an episode of the UK TV comedy drama Stella.

== Personal life ==
Calzaghe has three sons, two from an 11-year marriage to Mandy Davies from 1994 to 2005, and one from a 3-year relationship with Katie Matthews. Calzaghe split up with his girlfriend of five years, Jo-Emma Larvin, in 2009, after participating in the seventh series of the BBC's Strictly Come Dancing series, partnering with Russian professional Kristina Rihanoff. Calzaghe and Rihanoff began a relationship soon thereafter. However, the couple announced the amicable breakup of their relationship in August 2013.

Following an undercover investigation by the News of the World newspaper, Calzaghe admitted he had used cocaine since his boxing career had ended. In a statement on his website, he added that he regretted his "occasional use of cocaine in what have sometimes been the long days since my retirement from the ring".

Outside boxing, Calzaghe is a lifelong fan of Juventus FC.

== Professional boxing record ==
46 fights	46 wins	0 losses
By knockout	32	0
By decision	14	0

No.	Result	Record	Opponent	Type	Round, time	Date	Location	Notes
46	Win	46–0	Roy Jones Jr.	UD	12	8 Nov 2008	Madison Square Garden, New York City, New York, US	Retained The Ring light-heavyweight title
45	Win	45–0	Bernard Hopkins	SD	12	19 Apr 2008	Thomas & Mack Center, Paradise, Nevada, US	Won The Ring light-heavyweight title
44	Win	44–0	Mikkel Kessler	UD	12	3 Nov 2007	Millennium Stadium, Cardiff, Wales	Retained WBO and The Ring super-middleweight titles; Won WBA (Undisputed) and WBC super-middleweight titles
43	Win	43–0	Peter Manfredo Jr.	TKO	3 (12), 1:30	7 Apr 2007	Millennium Stadium, Cardiff, Wales	Retained WBO and The Ring super-middleweight titles
42	Win	42–0	Sakio Bika	UD	12	14 Oct 2006	MEN Arena, Manchester, England	Retained IBF, WBO and The Ring super-middleweight titles
41	Win	41–0	Jeff Lacy	UD	12	4 Mar 2006	MEN Arena, Manchester, England	Retained WBO super-middleweight title; Won IBF and inaugural The Ring super-middleweight titles
40	Win	40–0	Evans Ashira	UD	12	10 Sep 2005	International Arena, Cardiff, Wales	Retained WBO super-middleweight title
39	Win	39–0	Mario Veit	TKO	6 (12), 2:18	7 May 2005	Volkswagen Halle, Braunschweig, Germany	Retained WBO super-middleweight title
38	Win	38–0	Kabary Salem	UD	12	22 Oct 2004	Royal Highland Showground, Edinburgh, Scotland	Retained WBO super-middleweight title
37	Win	37–0	Mger Mkrtchyan	TKO	7 (12), 1:05	21 Feb 2004	National Ice Rink, Cardiff, Wales	Retained WBO super-middleweight title
36	Win	36–0	Byron Mitchell	TKO	2 (12), 2:36	28 Jun 2003	International Arena, Cardiff, Wales	Retained WBO super-middleweight title
35	Win	35–0	Tocker Pudwill	TKO	2 (12), 0:39	14 Dec 2002	Telewest Arena, Newcastle, England	Retained WBO super-middleweight title
34	Win	34–0	Miguel Ángel Jiménez	UD	12	17 Aug 2002	Cardiff Castle, Cardiff, Wales	Retained WBO super-middleweight title
33	Win	33–0	Charles Brewer	UD	12	20 Apr 2002	International Arena, Cardiff, Wales	Retained WBO super-middleweight title
32	Win	32–0	Will McIntyre	TKO	4 (12), 0:45	13 Oct 2001	Parken Stadium, Copenhagen, Denmark	Retained WBO super-middleweight title
31	Win	31–0	Mario Veit	TKO	1 (12), 1:52	28 Apr 2001	International Arena, Cardiff, Wales	Retained WBO super-middleweight title
30	Win	30–0	Richie Woodhall	TKO	10 (12), 0:28	16 Dec 2000	Sheffield Arena, Sheffield, England	Retained WBO super-middleweight title
29	Win	29–0	Omar Sheika	TKO	5 (12), 2:08	12 Aug 2000	Wembley Conference Centre, London, England	Retained WBO super-middleweight title
28	Win	28–0	David Starie	UD	12	29 Jan 2000	MEN Arena, Manchester, England	Retained WBO super-middleweight title
27	Win	27–0	Rick Thornberry	UD	12	5 Jun 1999	International Arena, Cardiff, Wales	Retained WBO super-middleweight title
26	Win	26–0	Robin Reid	SD	12	13 Feb 1999	Telewest Arena, Newcastle, England	Retained WBO super-middleweight title
25	Win	25–0	Juan Carlos Giménez Ferreyra	RTD	9 (12), 3:00	25 Apr 1998	National Ice Rink, Cardiff, Wales	Retained WBO super-middleweight title
24	Win	24–0	Branko Sobot	TKO	3 (12), 1:35	24 Jan 1998	International Arena, Cardiff, Wales	Retained WBO super-middleweight title
23	Win	23–0	Chris Eubank	UD	12	11 Oct 1997	Sheffield Arena, Sheffield, England	Won vacant WBO super-middleweight title
22	Win	22–0	Luciano Torres	TKO	3 (10), 0:52	5 Jun 1997	Whitchurch Leisure Centre, Bristol, England	
21	Win	21–0	Tyler Hughes	KO	1 (10), 2:04	22 Mar 1997	Wythenshawe Forum, Manchester, England	
20	Win	20–0	Carlos Christie	TKO	2 (10), 1:39	21 Jan 1997	Whitchurch Leisure Centre, Bristol, England	
19	Win	19–0	Pat Lawlor	TKO	2 (10), 1:55	15 May 1996	STAR Centre, Cardiff, Wales	
18	Win	18–0	Warren Stowe	TKO	2 (8), 3:00	4 May 1996	Goresbrook Leisure Centre, London, England	
17	Win	17–0	Mark Delaney	TKO	5 (12)	20 Apr 1996	International Centre, Brentwood, England	Retained British super-middleweight title
16	Win	16–0	Anthony Brooks	TKO	2 (10)	13 Mar 1996	Brent Town Hall, London, England	
15	Win	15–0	Guy Stanford	TKO	1 (10), 1:24	13 Feb 1996	Welsh Institute of Sport, Cardiff, Wales	
14	Win	14–0	Stephen Wilson	TKO	8 (12), 2:18	28 Oct 1995	Royal Albert Hall, London, England	Won vacant British super-middleweight title
13	Win	13–0	Nick Manners	TKO	4 (8), 2:20	30 Sep 1995	Festival Hall, Basildon, England	
12	Win	12–0	Tyrone Jackson	TKO	4 (8), 1:08	8 Jul 1995	Barbican Centre, York, England	
11	Win	11–0	Robert Curry	TKO	1 (8), 1:29	19 May 1995	Elephant and Castle Shopping Centre, London, England	
10	Win	10–0	Bobbie Joe Edwards	PTS	8	22 Feb 1995	Ice Rink, Telford, England	
9	Win	9–0	Frank Minton	KO	1 (8), 1:25	14 Feb 1995	York Hall, London, England	
8	Win	8–0	Trevor Ambrose	TKO	2 (8)	30 Nov 1994	Civic Hall, Wolverhampton, England	
7	Win	7–0	Mark Lee Dawson	TKO	1 (8)	1 Oct 1994	National Ice Rink, Cardiff, Wales	
6	Win	6–0	Karl Barwise	TKO	1 (6)	4 Jun 1994	National Ice Rink, Cardiff, Wales	
5	Win	5–0	Darren Littlewood	TKO	1 (6)	1 Mar 1994	Town Hall, Dudley, England	
4	Win	4–0	Martin Rosamond	TKO	1 (6)	22 Jan 1994	Welsh Institute of Sport, Cardiff, Wales	
3	Win	3–0	Spencer Alton	TKO	2 (4)	16 Dec 1993	Newport Centre, Newport, Wales	
2	Win	2–0	Paul Mason	TKO	1 (4)	10 Nov 1993	Town Hall, Watford, England	
1	Win	1–0	Paul Hanlon	TKO	1 (4)	1 Oct 1993	Cardiff Arms Park, Cardiff, Wales	

== Titles in boxing ==
=== Major world titles ===
- WBA (Undisputed) super-middleweight champion (168 lbs)
- WBC super-middleweight champion (168 lbs)
- IBF super-middleweight champion (168 lbs)
- WBO super-middleweight champion (168 lbs)

=== The Ring magazine titles ===
- The Ring super-middleweight champion (168 lbs)
- The Ring light-heavyweight champion (175 lbs)

=== Regional/International titles ===
- British super-middleweight champion (168 lbs)

=== Honorary titles ===
- WBO Super Champion

== Pay-per-view bouts ==
United States
Date	Fight	Billing	Buys	Network
November 8, 2008	Calzaghe vs. Jones	Battle of the Superpowers	225,000	HBO

== See also ==
- List of Welsh boxing world champions
- List of super-middleweight boxing champions
- List of light-heavyweight boxing champions
- List of WBA world champions
- List of WBC world champions
- List of IBF world champions
- List of WBO world champions
- List of The Ring champions
- List of undefeated boxing world champions
- List of Welsh boxing champions

Sporting positions
Amateur boxing titles
Previous: Timothy Taylor	ABA light-middleweight champion 1992	Next: David Starie
Previous: Lee Woolcock	ABA middleweight champion 1993	Next: David Starie
Regional boxing titles
Vacant Title last held by Sam Storey	British super-middleweight champion 28 October 1995 – May 1996; Vacated	Vacant Title next held by David Starie
World boxing titles
Vacant Title last held by Steve Collins	WBO super-middleweight champion 11 October 1997 – 26 September 2008; Vacated	Vacant Title next held by Denis Inkin
Preceded by Jeff Lacy	IBF super-middleweight champion 4 March 2006 – 27 November 2006; Vacated	Vacant Title next held by Alejandro Berrio
Inaugural champion	The Ring super-middleweight champion 4 March 2006 – 26 September 2008; Vacated	Vacant Title next held by Andre Ward
Preceded by Mikkel Kessler	WBA super-middleweight champion Undisputed title 4 November 2007 – 26 September 2008; Vacated	Vacant Title next held by Andre Ward
Preceded by Mikkel Kessler	WBC super-middleweight champion 4 November 2007 – 5 July 2008; Vacated	Vacant Title next held by Carl Froch
Preceded by Bernard Hopkins	The Ring light-heavyweight champion 19 April 2008 – 5 February 2009; Retired	Vacant Title next held by Jean Pascal
