= Charles Brewer (boxer) =

American boxer (born 1969)

Personal information
- Nickname: The Hatchet
- Born: Charles Brewer; October 16, 1969 (age 56) Philadelphia, Pennsylvania, U.S.
- Height: 6 ft 1 in (1.85 m)
- Weight: Super Middleweight

Boxing career
- Reach: 78 in (198 cm)
- Stance: Orthodox

Boxing record
- Total fights: 51
- Wins: 40
- Win by KO: 28
- Losses: 11

Charles Brewer (born October 15, 1969) is an American former professional boxer who competed from 1989 to 2005. He fought in the Super Middleweight division.

== Early life ==
Charles Brewer was born in Philadelphia, Pennsylvania in 1969. Known as "The Hatchet", Brewer was 14–3 as an amateur.

== Professional career ==
He turned professional in 1989 and in 1997 won the Vacant IBF Super Middleweight Title with a TKO over Gary Ballard. He defended the title three times including a knockout win over Herol Graham, before losing the belt to Sven Ottke in a split decision. In a 2000 rematch, he lost another split decision to Ottke.

In 2002, Brewer fought WBO Super Middleweight Title holder and future hall of famer Joe Calzaghe in Cardiff but lost by a wide margin. His last shot at the title came in 2004 when he took on WBO Super Middleweight Interim Title holder Mario Veit but was TKO'd in the 9th round. Brewer last fought in April 2005.

== Professional boxing record ==
51 fights	40 wins	11 losses
By knockout	28	5
By decision	12	6

No.	Result	Record	Opponent	Type	Round	Date	Location	Notes
51	Loss	40–11	Lolenga Mock	TKO	10 (12)	Apr 15, 2005	K.B. Hallen, Copenhagen, Denmark	For vacant WBO Inter-Continental super middleweight title
50	Loss	40–10	Mario Veit	TKO	9 (12)	Nov 6, 2004	Erdgas Arena, Riesa, Sachsen, Germany	For WBO interim super middleweight title
49	Win	40–9	Freeman Barr	TKO	5 (10)	Sep 19, 2003	Ritacco Center, Toms River, New Jersey, U.S.	
48	Win	39–9	Etianne Whitaker	UD	10	Jan 31, 2003	Tropicana Hotel & Casino, Atlantic City, New Jersey, U.S.	
47	Win	38–9	Scott Pemberton	TKO	6 (10)	Aug 2, 2002	Foxwoods Resort, Mashantucket, Connecticut, U.S.	
46	Loss	37–9	Joe Calzaghe	UD	12	Apr 20, 2002	International Arena, Cardiff, Wales	For WBO super middleweight title
45	Win	37–8	Fernando Zuniga	UD	12	Oct 5, 2001	First Union Center, Philadelphia, Pennsylvania, U.S.	Won vacant NABF super middleweight title
44	Loss	36–8	Antwun Echols	TKO	3 (12)	May 19, 2001	Mohegan Sun Casino, Uncasville, Connecticut, U.S.	For vacant NABA super middleweight title
43	Win	36–7	Esteban Cervantes	TKO	1 (10)	Dec 8, 2000	Blue Horizon, Philadelphia, Pennsylvania, U.S.	
42	Loss	35–7	Sven Ottke	SD	12	Sep 2, 2000	Bordelandhalle, Magdeburg, Sachsen-Anhalt, Germany	For IBF super middleweight title
41	Win	35–6	Laverne Clark	KO	2 (?)	Mar 3, 2000	Turning Stone Resort & Casino, Verona, New York, U.S.	
40	Win	34–6	Reggie Strickland	TKO	2 (10)	Oct 29, 1999	Farm Bureau Building, Indianapolis, Indiana, U.S.	
39	Win	33–6	Carlton Holland	TKO	2 (8)	May 8, 1999	Philips Halle, Duesseldorf, Nordrhein-Westfalen, Germany	
38	Loss	32–6	Sven Ottke	SD	12	Oct 24, 1998	Duesseldorf, Nordrhein-Westfalen, Germany	Lost IBF super middleweight title
37	Win	32–5	Antoine Byrd	TKO	3 (12)	Aug 22, 1998	Messehalle, Leipzig, Sachsen, Germany	Retained IBF super middleweight title
36	Win	31–5	Herol Graham	TKO	10 (12)	Mar 28, 1998	Boardwalk Convention Center, Atlantic City, New Jersey, U.S.	Retained IBF super middleweight title
35	Win	30–5	Joey DeGrandis	UD	12	Dec 2, 1997	Blue Horizon, Philadelphia, Pennsylvania, U.S.	Retained IBF super middleweight title
34	Win	29–5	Gary Ballard	TKO	5 (12)	Jun 21, 1997	Sun Dome, Tampa, Florida, U.S.	Won vacant IBF super middleweight title
33	Win	28–5	Greg Wright	UD	12	Feb 18, 1997	Blue Horizon, Philadelphia, Pennsylvania, U.S.	Retained USBA super middleweight title
32	Win	27–5	Fermin Chirino	UD	8	Oct 4, 1996	Madison Square Garden Theater, New York City, New York, U.S.	
31	Win	26–5	Frank Rhodes	UD	12	Mar 12, 1996	Blue Horizon, Philadelphia, Pennsylvania, U.S.	Won USBA super middleweight title
30	Win	25–5	Mark Buchannon	TKO	2 (10)	Oct 17, 1995	Blue Horizon, Philadelphia, Pennsylvania, U.S.	
29	Win	24–5	Adam Garland	TKO	3 (10)	Aug 1, 1995	Blue Horizon, Philadelphia, Pennsylvania, U.S.	
28	Loss	23–5	Rodney Toney	SD	10	Nov 8, 1994	Foxwoods Resort, Mashantucket, Connecticut, U.S.	
27	Win	23–4	Terry Seay	KO	2 (8)	Oct 20, 1994	Foxwoods Resort, Mashantucket, Connecticut, U.S.	
26	Loss	22–4	Rafael Williams	TKO	6 (10)	Jun 14, 1994	Blue Horizon, Philadelphia, Pennsylvania, U.S.	
25	Loss	22–3	Lonny Beasley	TKO	1 (10)	Feb 1, 1994	Blue Horizon, Philadelphia, Pennsylvania, U.S.	
24	Win	22–2	Mario Munoz	TKO	1 (10)	Nov 23, 1993	Blue Horizon, Philadelphia, Pennsylvania, U.S.	
23	Win	21–2	Steve Darnell	TKO	2 (10)	Jul 20, 1993	Blue Horizon, Philadelphia, Pennsylvania, U.S.	
22	Win	20–2	Carl Sullivan	KO	6 (10)	May 11, 1993	Blue Horizon, Philadelphia, Pennsylvania, U.S.	
21	Win	19–2	Aaron Smith	TKO	4 (6)	Jan 26, 1993	Blue Horizon, Philadelphia, Pennsylvania, U.S.	
20	Win	18–2	Danny Mitchell	KO	3 (8)	Oct 13, 1992	Blue Horizon, Philadelphia, Pennsylvania, U.S.	
19	Win	17–2	Ricky Stackhouse	TKO	3 (8)	Sep 11, 1992	Atlantis Hotel & Casino, Atlantic City, New Jersey, U.S.	
18	Win	16–2	Ernest Kennedy	KO	1 (8)	Aug 14, 1992	Trump Plaza Hotel, Atlantic City, New Jersey, U.S.	
17	Win	15–2	Willie Harris	KO	1 (8)	Jun 25, 1992	Blue Horizon, Philadelphia, Pennsylvania, U.S.	
16	Loss	14–2	Robert Thomas	SD	8	Jan 12, 1992	Harrah's Marina Hotel Casino, Atlantic City, New Jersey, U.S.	
15	Loss	14–1	Robert Thomas	SD	6	Sep 20, 1991	National Guard Armory, Philadelphia, Pennsylvania, U.S.	
14	Win	14–0	Joaquin Velasquez	TKO	2 (8)	Aug 9, 1991	Convention Hall, Atlantic City, New Jersey, U.S.	
13	Win	13–0	Mark Buchannon	UD	8	May 16, 1991	Harrah's Marina Hotel Casino, Atlantic City, New Jersey, U.S.	
12	Win	12–0	Eddie Evans	TKO	3 (8)	Mar 8, 1991	Trump Taj Mahal, Atlantic City, New Jersey, U.S.	
11	Win	11–0	Freddy Sanchez	UD	6	Dec 28, 1990	Taj Majal Hotel & Casino, Atlantic City, New Jersey, U.S.	
10	Win	10–0	Fred Rivero	TKO	4 (6)	Sep 21, 1990	Taj Mahal´s Mark G Etess Arena, Atlantic City, New Jersey, U.S.	
9	Win	9–0	Willie Douglas	MD	6	Jun 24, 1990	Convention Center, Atlantic City, New Jersey, U.S.	
8	Win	8–0	Willie Douglas	PTS	8	Apr 29, 1990	Caesars Hotel & Casino, Atlantic City, New Jersey, U.S.	
7	Win	7–0	Roberto Perez	TKO	3 (?)	Mar 18, 1990	Resorts International, Atlantic City, New Jersey, U.S.	
6	Win	6–0	John McClendon	TKO	4 (?)	Jan 14, 1990	Caesars Hotel & Casino, Atlantic City, New Jersey, U.S.	
5	Win	5–0	John McClendon	UD	4	Dec 19, 1989	Caesars Hotel & Casino, Atlantic City, New Jersey, U.S.	
4	Win	4–0	Eric Rhinehart	TKO	3 (?)	Nov 7, 1989	Trump Castle, Atlantic City, New Jersey, U.S.	
3	Win	3–0	Ray Anthony Reid	TKO	3 (4)	Oct 3, 1989	Blue Horizon, Philadelphia, Pennsylvania, U.S.	
2	Win	2–0	Robert Edmonds	UD	4	Sep 25, 1989	Harrah's Marina Hotel Casino, Atlantic City, New Jersey, U.S.	
1	Win	1–0	Jerome Johnson	KO	2 (4)	Aug 3, 1989	Blue Horizon, Philadelphia, Pennsylvania, U.S.	

Regional boxing titles
Preceded by Frank Rhodes	USBA Super Middleweight Champion; March 12, 1996 – June 21, 1997; Won world title	Vacant Title next held by Antione Byrd
World boxing titles
Preceded by Roy Jones Jr. Vacated	IBF Super Middleweight Champion; 21 June 1997 – 24 October 1998	Succeeded by Sven Ottke

== See also ==
- List of IBF world champions
