= Denis Inkin =

Russian boxer

Personal information
- Nationality: Russian
- Born: 7 January 1978 (age 48) Novosibirsk, Russian SFSR, Soviet Union
- Height: 182 cm (6 ft 0 in)
- Weight: Super middleweight

Boxing career
- Stance: Orthodox

Boxing record
- Total fights: 35
- Wins: 34
- Win by KO: 24
- Losses: 1

Denis Inkin (born 7 January 1978) Russian: Инкин, Денис Анатольевич is a Russian former professional boxer who fought in Germany at super middleweight.

== Amateur career ==
Before turning professional Inkin had an extensive career as an amateur whilst serving as a Captain in the tank forces of the Russian army.

=== Amateur record ===
- 1994 won the European Cadet Championships (U-17) in Patras, Greece as a Light Middleweight.
- 1997 won the Military World Championships in San Antonio, USA as a Middleweight.
- 1999 won the 2nd Military World Games in Zagreb, Croatia as a Middleweight. The results were:

== Professional career ==
=== Debut fight ===
Inkin's first fight as a professional boxer was in June 2001, in his home town of Novosibirsk, when he beat Kazakhstani fighter Talgat Abdykarimov with a first round knockout.

=== Russian base ===
Inkin fought all of his first 23 fights in Russia and Ukraine, with the exception of one in the United Kingdom, winning all of his fights with 17 wins by KO.

=== First belt ===
During his time being based in Russia, Inkin fought for his first title belt against Bulgarian Veselin Nikolaev Vasilev in Moscow, for the vacant IBF Inter-Continental super middleweight title. Inkin knocked Vasilev out in the first round to take the title.

=== Move to Germany ===
He moved to Germany in June 2005 from where he boxed in Germany, Austria, Slovenia and Croatia and won that WBC International super middleweight title against German Mario Veit with a seventh round KO of Veit.

=== WBO Super middleweight title ===
On September 27, 2008, at the Color Line Arena in Hamburg, Germany, Inkin claimed the vacant WBO super middleweight title, previously held by Joe Calzaghe for over 11 years, with a twelve round unanimous decision victory over Fulgencio Zuniga. In January 2009, in his first defence of the title, Inkin lost to Hungarian Karoly Balzsay over 12 rounds in Germany.

== Professional boxing record ==
35 fights	34 wins	1 loss
By knockout	24	0
By decision	10	1

No.	Result	Record	Opponent	Type	Round, time	Date	Location	Notes
35	Loss	34–1	Károly Balzsay	UD	12	Jan 10, 2009	Bordelandhalle, Magdeburg, Germany	Lost WBO super middleweight title
34	Win	34–0	Fulgencio Zúñiga	UD	12	Sep 27, 2008	Color Line Arena, Altona, Germany	Won vacant WBO super middleweight title
33	Win	33–0	Sergey Beloshapkin	UD	6	Jul 24, 2008	Vodoley, Ekaterinburg, Russia	
32	Win	32–0	Martin Abel Bruer	UD	12	Nov 24, 2007	Freiberger Arena, Dresden, Germany	Retained WBC International super middleweight title
31	Win	31–0	József Nagy	TKO	5 (12), 2:08	Jun 30, 2007	Porsche Arena, Stuttgart, Germany	Retained WBC International super middleweight title
30	Win	30–0	Emmanuel Duma	TKO	7 (10), 1:48	Feb 27, 2007	Kugelbake-Halle, Cuxhaven, Germany	
29	Win	29–0	Mario Veit	KO	7 (12), 1:52	Oct 21, 2006	Brandberge Arena, Halle an der Saale, Germany	Won WBC International super middleweight title
28	Win	28–0	Konni Konrad	UD	8	May 23, 2006	Sportna Dvoran Center, Ptuj, Slovenia	
27	Win	27–0	Peter Mashamaite	UD	10	Feb 28, 2006	Alte Reithalle, Stuttgart, Germany	
26	Win	26–0	Antonio Valentin Ochoa	TKO	5 (10), 2:40	Dec 13, 2005	Freizeit Arena, Soelden, Austria	
25	Win	25–0	Malik Dziarra	KO	4 (10), 2:09	Sep 17, 2005	Harzlandhalle, Ilsenburg, Germany	
24	Win	24–0	Gerardo Soria	TKO	4 (8)	Jun 18, 2005	Amphitheater Arena, Pula, Serbia	
23	Win	23–0	Maneno Oswald	TKO	3 (10)	May 19, 2005	Giant Hall, Casino Conti, Saint Petersburg, Russia	
22	Win	22–0	George Adipo Odour	KO	1 (8)	Mar 9, 2005	Infinity Nightclub, Moscow, Russia	
21	Win	21–0	Branko Sobot	TKO	2 (8)	Dec 16, 2004	Centr na Tulskoy, Moscow, Russia	
20	Win	20–0	Julio César Vásquez	TKO	7 (10)	Sep 24, 2004	Ice Palace, Novosibirsk, Russia	
19	Win	19–0	Denis Solomko	TKO	3 (10)	Jul 6, 2004	M.E.N. Arena, Manchester, Lancashire, England, UK	
18	Win	18–0	Ovill McKenzie	PTS	8	Apr 3, 2004	M.E.N. Arena, Manchester, Lancashire, England, UK	
17	Win	17–0	Yuri Tsarenka	UD	8	Jan 30, 2004	DIVS, Ekaterinburg, Russia	
16	Win	16–0	Chris Nembhard	TKO	4 (8)	Nov 27, 2003	Olimpyskiy Sports Palace, Chekhov, Russia	
15	Win	15–0	Jose Hilton Dos Santos	TKO	7 (12)	Sep 6, 2003	Sport Palace, Kyiv, Ukraine	Retained IBF Inter-Continental super middleweight title
14	Win	14–0	Veselin Vasilev	KO	1 (12)	Jun 26, 2003	USC Soviet Wings, Moscow, Russia	Won vacant IBF Inter-Continental super middleweight title
13	Win	13–0	Dmitry Gerasimov	KO	4 (6)	Apr 19, 2003	Circus, Saint Petersburg, Russia	
12	Win	12–0	Sergey Karanevich	UD	8	Jan 26, 2003	Novosibirsk, Russia	
11	Win	11–0	Ilyas Taramov	TKO	2 (8)	Dec 22, 2002	Novosibirsk, Russia	
10	Win	10–0	Bakhtiyar Khodzhiyev	TKO	3 (8)	Nov 6, 2002	Novosibirsk, Russia	
9	Win	9–0	Ilyas Taramov	TKO	1 (6)	Oct 10, 2002	Ekaterinburg, Russia	
8	Win	8–0	Viktor Geraschenko	UD	6	Aug 31, 2002	Novosibirsk, Russia	
7	Win	7–0	Viktor Geraschenko	TKO	5 (6)	May 18, 2002	Ice Palace, Tyumen, Russia	
6	Win	6–0	Dmitry Treskov	TKO	5 (6)	Mar 28, 2002	Ekaterinburg, Russia	
5	Win	5–0	Igor Lyzunyk	TKO	4 (8)	Feb 16, 2002	Ice Palace, Novosibirsk, Russia	
4	Win	4–0	Vage Kocharyan	UD	6	Dec 11, 2001	Ice Palace, Novosibirsk, Russia	
3	Win	3–0	Aliaksandr Kravchanka	KO	1 (6)	Nov 10, 2001	Ice Palace, Novosibirsk, Russia	
2	Win	2–0	Mger Mkrtchyan	TKO	2 (6)	Oct 13, 2001	Giant Hall, Casino Conti, Saint Petersburg, Russia	
1	Win	1–0	Talgat Abdykarimov	KO	1 (4)	Jun 30, 2001	Ice Palace, Novosibirsk, Russia	

Achievements
Vacant Title last held by Joe Calzaghe; Vacated	WBO super middleweight champion September 27, 2008- January 10, 2009	Succeeded by Károly Balzsay
