= Károly Balzsay =

Hungarian boxer

Personal information
- Nickname: Karesz ("Hitter")
- Nationality: Hungarian
- Born: 23 July 1979 (age 46) Kecskemét, Hungarian People's Republic (now Hungary)
- Height: 6 ft 0 in (183 cm)
- Weight: Super middleweight

Boxing career
- Stance: Southpaw

Boxing record
- Total fights: 27
- Wins: 25
- Win by KO: 18
- Losses: 2
Medal record
Men's Amateur boxing
Representing Hungary
European Championships
Silver medal – second place	2002 Perm	Middleweight

Károly Balzsay (born 23 July 1979) is a Hungarian former professional boxer who competed from 2004 to 2012.

== Amateur highlights ==
- Member of the Hungarian Olympic team of Sydney at Light Middleweight
- Member of the Hungarian Olympic team of Athens at Middleweight
- Silver medalist in the 2002 European Amateur Boxing Championships, Perm, Russia
- 7x Hungarian amateur champion

Amateur record: W231-L27-D2 (72KO's)

- 2000 Olympic Results - Boxed as a Light Middleweights (71 kg)
  - 1st Round - Bye
  - Round of 16 - Lost to Pornchai Thongburan of Thailand, 12-17
- 2004 Olympic Results - Boxed as a Middleweights (75 kg)
  - Round of 32 - Defeated Sahraoui Mohamed of Tunisia, 29-24
  - Round of 16 - Lost to Yordanis Despaigne of Cuba, 38-25

== Professional career ==
He made his professional debut on September 11, 2004 in the Kisstadion of Budapest against Milojko Pivljanin of Serbia and Montenegro.

In January, 2009 he won the WBO super middleweight title from Denis Inkin and became the third Hungarian World Champion of Universum Box-Promotion after István Kovács and Zsolt Erdei.

In August 2009 he lost the title in his second defense against Robert Stieglitz by an 11th round TKO.

In 2011, Balzsay defeated Stanyslav Kashtanov to win the vacant WBA (Regular) super-middleweight title, he made one defence against Dimitri Sartison.

== Professional boxing record ==
27 fights	25 wins	2 losses
By knockout	18	1
By decision	7	1

No.	Result	Record	Opponent	Type	Round, time	Date	Location	Notes
27	Win	25–2	Dimitri Sartison	TKO	12 (12), 2:25	21 Apr 2012	Sport- und Kongresshalle, Schwerin, Germany	Retained WBA (Regular) super-middleweight title
26	Win	24–2	Stanyslav Kashtanov	SD	12	26 Aug 2011	Donbas Arena, Donetsk, Ukraine	Won vacant WBA (Regular) super-middleweight title
25	Win	23–2	Miša Nikolić	KO	4 (6), 2:10	19 Nov 2010	Universum Gym, Hamburg, Germany	
24	Win	22–2	Aziz Daari	KO	5 (8), 0:34	31 Jul 2010	O2 World, Hamburg, Germany	
23	Loss	21–2	Eduard Gutknecht	SD	12	4 Dec 2009	Freizeit Arena, Sölden, Austria	For vacant WBO Inter-Continental super-middleweight title
22	Loss	21–1	Robert Stieglitz	TKO	11 (12), 0:12	22 Aug 2009	SYMA Sports and Conference Centre, Budapest, Hungary	Lost WBO super-middleweight title
21	Win	21–0	Maselino Masoe	KO	11 (12), 2:07	25 Apr 2009	König Palast, Krefeld, Germany	Retained WBO super-middleweight title
20	Win	20–0	Denis Inkin	UD	12	10 Jan 2009	Bördelandhalle, Magdeburg, Germany	Won WBO super-middleweight title
19	Win	19–0	José Alberto Clavero	KO	5 (12), 2:17	25 Jul 2008	Gerry Weber Stadion, Halle, Germany	Retained WBO Inter-Continental super-middleweight title
18	Win	18–0	Mantas Tarvydas	TKO	10 (12), 2:29	26 Apr 2008	Freiberger Arena, Dresden, Germany	Retained WBO Inter-Continental super-middleweight title
17	Win	17–0	Rubén Acosta	UD	12	24 Nov 2007	Freiberger Arena, Dresden, Germany	Won vacant WBO Inter-Continental super-middleweight title
16	Win	16–0	Jose Hilton Dos Santos	KO	5 (8), 2:59	16 Jun 2007	SYMA Sports and Conference Centre, Budapest, Hungary	
15	Win	15–0	Soon Botes	KO	2 (10), 1:16	27 Jan 2007	Burg-Waechter Castello, Düsseldorf, Germany	
14	Win	14–0	Michal Bilak	TKO	2 (8), 2:01	21 Nov 2006	Universum Gym, Hamburg, Germany	
13	Win	13–0	Etianne Whitaker	TKO	4 (8), 0:59	9 Sep 2006	Bördelandhalle, Magdeburg, Germany	
12	Win	12–0	Maneno Oswald	KO	1 (8), 1:59	6 May 2006	Burg-Waechter Castello, Düsseldorf, Germany	
11	Win	11–0	José Ubarnes	TKO	5 (8)	4 Feb 2006	Burg-Waechter Castello, Düsseldorf, Germany	
10	Win	10–0	Sergey Kharchenko	UD	8	22 Oct 2005	Brandberge Arena, Halle, Germany	
9	Win	9–0	Konstantin Makhankov	UD	8	20 Sep 2005	T-Mobile Arena, Prague, Czech Republic	
8	Win	8–0	Youssef Temsoury	TKO	2 (6), 1:14	2 Jul 2005	Color Line Arena, Hamburg, Germany	
7	Win	7–0	Jevgenijs Andrejevs	UD	6	7 May 2005	Volkswagen Halle, Braunschweig, Germany	
6	Win	6–0	Willie McDonald	TKO	2 (6), 0:07	16 Apr 2005	Bördelandhalle, Magdeburg, Germany	
5	Win	5–0	Danny De Beul	KO	2 (6), 0:54	26 Mar 2005	Erdgas Arena, Riesa, Germany	
4	Win	4–0	Jessy Moreaux	TKO	2 (6), 2:29	26 Feb 2005	Color Line Arena, Hamburg, Germany	
3	Win	3–0	Ronny Daniels	UD	6	14 Dec 2004	Freizeit Arena, Sölden, Austria	
2	Win	2–0	Mounir Sahli	TKO	2 (4), 1:49	6 Nov 2004	Erdgas Arena, Riesa, Germany	
1	Win	1–0	Milojko Pivljanin	TKO	3 (4), 0:52	11 Sep 2004	Kisstadion, Budapest, Hungary	

== See also ==
- List of southpaw stance boxers
- List of world super-middleweight boxing champions

Sporting positions
Regional boxing titles
Vacant Title last held by Jürgen Brähmer	WBO Inter-Continental super-middleweight champion November 24, 2007 – January 10, 2009; Won world title	Vacant Title next held by Jean Pascal
World boxing titles
Preceded by Denis Inkin	WBO super-middleweight champion January 10, 2009 – August 22, 2009	Succeeded by Robert Stieglitz
Vacant Title last held by Dimitri Sartison	WBA super-middleweight champion Regular title August 26, 2011 – August 3, 2012; Status changed	Succeeded by Brian Magee promoted from interim status
Honorary boxing titles
New title	WBA super-middleweight champion Champion in recess August 3, 2012 – October 3, 2012; Retired	Vacant
