= Alejandro Berrio =

Colombian boxer (born 1976)

Personal information
- Nickname: Ñaco
- Nationality: Colombian
- Born: Alejandro Berrio Hernández; August 7, 1976 (age 49) Cartagena, Colombia
- Height: 6 ft 1 in (185 cm)
- Weight: Middleweight; Super middleweight; Light heavyweight; Cruiserweight

Boxing career
- Reach: 76 in (193 cm)
- Stance: Orthodox

Boxing record
- Total fights: 59
- Wins: 41
- Win by KO: 34
- Losses: 18
- No contests: 1

Alejandro Berrio Hernández (born August 7, 1976) is a Colombian professional boxer.

== Professional career ==
Known as "Ñaco", Berrio turned pro in 1997 and won the Vacant IBF Super Middleweight Title with a TKO win over Robert Stieglitz in Rostock, Germany. Berrio sent Stieglitz to the canvas twice with right hands, with the referee stopping the fight with 23 seconds left in the third. It was a rematch between the two fighters, with Stieglitz winning the first bout in late 2005 via TKO.

He lost his title against Lucian Bute in Montreal on 2007-10-19 by TKO on the 11th round.

== Professional boxing record ==
59 fights	41 wins	18 losses
By knockout	34	16
By decision	7	2

No.	Result	Record	Opponent	Type	Round, time	Date	Location	Notes
59	Loss	41–18	Omar Nguale Ilunga	TKO	8 (10)	2023-12-16	Gimnasio 101 Boxing Club, Medellín, Colombia	
58	Win	41–17	Edier Corredor	UD	6 (6)	2023-10-28	Restaurante Bar Don Juan, Carmen de Apicalá, Colombia	
57	Loss	40–17	Jesus Escalera	TKO	3 (10)	2023-09-17	Canchas Sinteticas Maracana, Espinal, Colombia	
56	Win	40–16	Sergio Cabrera	KO	4 (6)	2023-08-05	Club Las Margaritas, Melgar, Colombia	
55	Loss	39–16	Jesus Escalera	KO	1 (10)	2023-04-01	Polideportivo, San Luis, Colombia	
54	Loss	39–15	Maximiliano Alejandro Sosa	UD	8 (8)	2023-03-12	Discoteca Daiquiri, Espinal, Colombia	
53	Loss	39–14	Anthony Martinez	TKO	3 (10)	2022-11-19	Coliseo de Pescaito David Ruiz Ureche, Santa Marta, Colombia	
52	Loss	39–13	Felix Parada	TKO	8 (8)	2022-08-20	Coco Locos Restaurant Sports Bar, Sosua, Dominican Republic	
51	Loss	39–12	Roberto White	TKO	2 (8)	2022-06-25	Groove Music Hall, Thornburg, Virginia, U.S.	
50	Loss	39–11	Andrey Mangushev	UD	6 (6)	2022-04-24	Club La Amistad, Santa Marta, Colombia	
49	Loss	39–10	Firat Arslan	KO	4 (12)	2021-12-04	Sartory-Saal, Cologne, Germany	
48	Win	39–9	Jose Luis Herrera	UD	8 (8)	2021-11-10	Hostal Camping Yolimar, Santiago de Tolu, Colombia	
47	Loss	38–9	Carlouse Welch	TKO	4 (8)	2021-06-11	Coliseo Luis Patron Rosano, Santiago de Tolu, Colombia	
46	Loss	38–8	Samuel Clarkson	TKO	2 (10)	2017-11-02	Sky Lobby Chase Tower, Dallas, Texas, U.S.	
45	Win	38–7	Evert Bravo	KO	3 (8)	2016-04-30	Barrio La Magdalena, Barranquilla, Colombia	
44	Win	37–7	Amaury Racero	TKO	1 (6)	2016-03-04	Coliseo Luis Patron Rosano, Santiago de Tolu, Colombia	
43	Loss	36–7	Damir Beljo	RTD	4 (10)	2014-09-26	Frankfurt, Germany	For WBF Intercontinental cruiserweight title
42	Win	36-6	Orlando Torres	UD	8 (8)	2014-09-07	Gimnasio Cuadrilatero, Barranquilla, Colombia	
41	Win	35–6	Yeison Reyes	KO	1 (8)	2014-08-18	Barrio Chiquinquira, Barranquilla, Colombia	
40	Win	34–6	Fulgencio Zúñiga	UD	10 (10)	2013-11-01	Coliseo Bernardo Caraballo, Cartagena, Colombia	
39	Win	33–6	Jose Hilton Dos Santos	TKO	3 (10)	2013-05-10	Coliseo Bernardo Caraballo, Cartagena, Colombia	
38	Loss	32–6	Fulgencio Zúñiga	KO	7 (10)	2012-07-19	Coliseo Bernardo Caraballo, Cartagena, Colombia	
37	Win	32–5	Antwun Echols	TKO	3 (6)	2011-02-26	Heartland Events Center, Grand Island, Nebraska, U.S.	
36	Win	31–5	Félix José Hernández	UD	10 (10)	2010-09-03	Estadio de Softbol, Tolú, Colombia	
35	Win	30–5	Jose Chiquillo	UD	6 (6)	2010-05-16	Kiosko El Bony, La Boquilla, Colombia	
34	Win	29–5	Juan Francisco Reyes	TKO	1 (10)	2009-10-19	Coliseo Carlos 'Teo' Cruz, Santo Domingo, Dominican Republic	
33	Win	28–5	Elias Ruiz	TKO	3 (10)	2008-07-03	Coliseo de Combate, Cartagena, Colombia	
32	Win	27–5	Fidel Sarmiento	TKO	3 (10)	2008-05-30	Coliseo Humberto Perea, Barranquilla, Colombia	
31	Loss	26–5	Lucian Bute	TKO	11 (12)	2007-10-19	Bell Centre, Montreal, Quebec, Canada	Lost IBF super-middleweight title
30	Win	26–4	Robert Stieglitz	TKO	3 (12)	2007-03-03	Stadthalle, Rostock, Germany	Won vacant IBF super-middleweight title
29	Win	25–4	Yusaf Mack	TKO	6 (12)	2006-05-19	Club Cinema, Pompano Beach, Florida, U.S.	
28	Win	24–4	Eusebio Chiquillo	KO	4 (6)	2006-03-04	Estadio Polideportivo, Arjona, Colombia	
27	Loss	23–4	Robert Stieglitz	TKO	11 (12)	2005-12-03	Bördelandhalle, Magdeburg, Germany	
26	Win	23–3	Syd Vanderpool	KO	9 (10)	2005-04-22	Seminole Hard Rock Hotel and Casino, Hollywood, Florida, U.S.	
25	Win	22–3	Carl Handy	TKO	8 (12)	2004-11-20	Club Ovation, Boynton Beach, Florida, U.S.	Won vacant IBO Inter-Continental light-heavyweight title
24	Win	21–3	Robert JR Davis	TKO	4 (8)	2004-08-28	Club Ovation, Boynton Beach, Florida, U.S.	
23	Win	20–3	Jose Chiquillo	PTS	8 (8)	2003-06-21	Cartagena, Colombia	
22	Loss	19–3	Eric Mitchell	TKO	1 (10)	2003-03-29	Spectrum, Philadelphia, Pennsylvania, U.S.	
21	Win	19–2	Rosman Henry	KO	1 (12)	2002-11-30	Coliseo Cubierto, Puerto Colombia, Colombia	Retained WBC FECARBOX middleweight title
20	Win	18–2	Javier Castillo	TKO	10 (12)	2002-08-09	International Fair Amphitheatre, San Salvador, El Salvador	Won vacant WBO Latino middleweight title
19	Win	17–2	Eliecer Munoz	KO	1 (?)	2002-02-15	Cartagena, Colombia	
18	Win	16–2	Saul Torres	KO	3 (?)	2001-11-02	Cartagena, Colombia	
17	Win	15–2	Diosmel Anaya	KO	3 (10)	2001-09-21	Barranquilla, Colombia	
16	Win	14–2	Odrin Bello	KO	11 (12)	2001-07-27	Cartagena, Colombia	Retained WBC FECARBOX middleweight title
15	Loss	13–2	Henry Porras	KO	6 (?)	2001-06-01	San Jose, Costa Rica	
14	Win	13–1	Teodocio Jimenez	TKO	2 (12)	2001-01-13	Barranquilla, Colombia	Won vacant WBC FECARBOX middleweight title
13	Win	12–1	Miguel Angel Dominguez	KO	5 (6)	2000-11-03	Erandio, Spain	
12	Win	11–1	Jimmy Salas	KO	1 (?)	2000-08-26	Galapa, Colombia	
11	Loss	10–1	Jairo Jesus Siris	KO	5 (?)	1998-11-06	Coliseo Bernardo Caraballo, Cartagena, Colombia	
10	Win	10–0	Diosmel Anaya	KO	2 (?)	1998-08-14	Santa Marta, Colombia	
9	Win	9–0	Luis Blandon	KO	2 (?)	1998-07-03	Cartagena, Colombia	
8	Win	8–0	Jorge Gomez	KO	2 (?)	1998-06-05	Caballo, Colombia	
7	Win	7–0	Ruben Dario Prada	KO	2 (?)	1998-03-14	Barranquilla, Colombia	
6	Win	6–0	Humberto Herrera	TKO	6 (?)	1997-12-19	Coliseo Elias Chegwin, Barranquilla, Colombia	
5	Win	5–0	Luis Blandon	KO	1 (?)	1997-11-30	San Juan de Uraba, Colombia	
4	Win	4–0	Hector Babilonia	KO	2 (?)	1997-10-18	Cartagena, Colombia	
3	Win	3–0	Oney Valdez	TKO	2 (?)	1997-06-13	Arjona, Colombia	
2	Win	2–0	Omar Martinez	KO	2 (?)	1997-04-11	Arboletes, Colombia	
1	Win	1–0	Arnovis Martinez	KO	1 (?)	1997-02-28	Cartagena, Colombia	

== See also ==
- List of world super-middleweight boxing champions

Sporting positions
Regional boxing titles
Vacant Title last held by Gustavo Magallanes	WBC FECARBOX middleweight champion January 13, 2001 – 2003; Vacated	Vacant Title next held by Ruben Padilla
Vacant Title last held by Héctor Javier Velazco	WBO Latino middleweight champion August 9, 2002 – 2003; Vacated	Vacant Title next held by Mariano Natalio Carrera
Vacant Title last held by Darren Corbett	IBO Inter-Continental light-heavyweight champion November 20, 2004 – March 3, 2007; Won world title	Vacant Title next held by Dean Francis
World boxing titles
Vacant Title last held by Joe Calzaghe	IBF super-middleweight champion March 3, 2007 – October 19, 2007	Succeeded by Lucian Bute
