= Ray Domenge =

American boxer

Personal information
- Nationality: American
- Born: June 5, 1965 (age 61) Omaha, Nebraska, U.S.
- Height: 5 ft 9 in (175 cm)
- Weight: Super Middleweight

Boxing career
- Stance: Orthodox

Boxing record
- Total fights: 44
- Wins: 29
- Win by KO: 16
- Losses: 13
- Draws: 0
- No contests: 2

Ray Domenge (born June 5, 1965) is an American retired boxer who unsuccessfully challenged Mario Veit for his WBO Intercontinental super middleweight title in 1999. He fought Rob Calloway for the WAA Light Heavyweight Title but lost by TKO in 1996.

He won the WAA Light Heavyweight Title in 1997 against Allen Smith by KO. He also won the WAA Middleweight Title in 1999 against Johnathan Corn. He was going for his 3rd title against Mario Veit for the WBO Inter-Continental super middleweight title but lost by the scorecards.

Domenge also fought against the legend Roberto Durán in 1996 but lost the fight due to scorecard.

Domenge's last fight was against Juergen Braehmer who knocked Domenge out in 25 seconds.

== Professional boxing record ==
29 Wins (16 knockouts, 13 decisions), 13 Losses (6 knockouts, 7 decisions), 2 No Contests
Result	Record	Opponent	Type	Round	Date	Location	Notes
Loss	19-0	(Germany) Juergen Braehmer	KO	3	24/11/2001	Universum Gym, Wandsbek, Germany	Domenge knocked out at 0:25 of the third round.
Win	77-34-1	(United States) Rob Bleakley	UD	8	25/08/2001	(United States) Casino Omaha, Onawa, Iowa	
Win	13-61-3	(United States) Richard W. Wilson	PTS	4	07/04/2001	(United States) Veteran's Coliseum, Cedar Rapids, Iowa	
Loss	33-7-6	(Guyana) Tony Marshall	UD	10	26/02/2000	(United States) Madison Square Garden, New York City	
Loss	24-0	(Germany) Mario Veit	UD	12	23/10/1999	Ballsporthalle, Frankfurt, Germany	WBO Intercontinental Super Middleweight Title.
Win	26-0-1	(United States) Jonathan Corn	UD	12	03/09/1999	(United States) Casino Omaha, Onawa, Iowa	WAA Middleweight Title.
Win	1-16	(United States) Rocky Navarro	TKO	8	26/06/1999	(United States) Omaha, Nebraska	
Win	26-100-1	(United States) Walter Cowans	KO	3	27/03/1999	(United States) Crete Sokol Hall, Omaha, Nebraska	
Win	13-30-1	(United States) Danny Thomas	PTS	6	20/03/1999	(United States) Horton, Kansas	
No Contest	10-1-1	(United States) Jesse Aquino	ND	6	19/02/1999	(United States) Memorial Auditorium, Burlington, Iowa	
Loss	14-1	(United States) Omar Sheika	KO	2	31 Oct 1998	(United States) Atlantic City Convention Center, Atlantic City, New Jersey	
Win	13-19-2	(United States) Eric "Landlord" Davis	UD	8	09/05/1998	(United States) Casino Omaha, Onawa, Iowa	
Loss	22-1	(Denmark) Mads Larsen	KO	3	13/02/1998	Falconer Scenen, Copenhagen, Denmark	
Win	16-5-3	(United States) Allen Smith	KO	4	20/09/1997	(United States) Casino Omaha, Onawa, Iowa	WAA Light Heavyweight Title. Smith knocked out at 1:56 of the fourth round.
No Contest	15-5-3	(United States) Allen Smith	NC	2	14/06/1997	(United States) Casino Omaha, Onawa, Iowa	WAA Super Middleweight Title.
Loss	20-2	(United States) Rob Calloway	TKO	9	02/04/1997	(United States) Station Casino, Kansas City, Missouri	WAA Light Heavyweight Title. Referee stopped the bout at 2:57 of the ninth round.
Win	28-29-2	(United States) Frank Minton	TKO	9	06/09/1996	(United States) Casino Omaha, Onawa, Iowa	
Win	5-15	(United States) Carlos Vasquez	TKO	2	01/06/1996	(United States) Casino Omaha, Onawa, Iowa	
Loss	95-11	(Panama) Roberto Durán	UD	10	20/02/1996	(United States) Mahi Temple Shrine Auditorium, Miami, Florida	
Win	11-41-4	(United States) Darrell Miller	KO	2	19/09/1995	(United States) Omaha, Nebraska	
Win	26-8	(United States) Heath Todd	PTS	8	03/08/1995	(United States) Omaha, Nebraska	
Win	19-104-4	(United States) Reggie Strickland	PTS	6	12/05/1994	(United States) Omaha, Nebraska	
Win	0-12-1	(United States) Tommy Degen	KO	2	05/02/1994	(United States) Veteran's Coliseum, Cedar Rapids, Iowa	
Loss	19-2-1	(Northern Ireland) Ray Close	TKO	4	16/10/1993	(Northern Ireland) Kings Hall, Belfast	
Win	0-3	(United States) Donald Hudson	KO	1	07/10/1993	(United States) Yellow Rose, Iowa	
Win	3-6	(United States) Jay Clark	TKO	6	05/08/1993	(United States) Council Bluffs, Iowa	
Win	--	John Stevens	KO	2	17/06/1993	(United States) Council Bluffs, Iowa	
Win	0-1	(United States) Jim McClain	TKO	1	20/05/1993	(United States) Lincoln, Nebraska	
Loss	15-0-1	(United Kingdom) Henry Wharton	TKO	3	07/04/1993	(United Kingdom) Leeds, Yorkshire	
Win	13-40-4	(United States) Jesse Abrams	MD	10	28/11/1992	(United States) North Platte, Nebraska	
Loss	8-1	(United States) Tony Menefee	SD	12	02/05/1992	(United States) Lincoln, Nebraska	
Win	0-5	(United States) Jim Farr	PTS	6	14/11/1991	(United States) Omaha, Nebraska	
Loss	42-2-1	(France) Antoine Fernandez	PTS	8	14/08/1991	(France) La Seyne-sur-Mer, Var	
Loss	9-0	(United States) Tocker Pudwill	PTS	4	01/08/1991	(United States) Butte, Montana	
Win	2-9	(United States) Al Bell	TKO	3	23/05/1991	(United States) Omaha, Nebraska	
Win	0-17-1	(United States) Richard W. Wilson	TKO	5	18/02/1991	(United States) Peony Park, Omaha, Nebraska	
Win	13-11-1	(United States) Steve Langley	UD	10	29/11/1990	(United States) Peony Park, Omaha, Nebraska	
Win	20-30-1	(United States) Anthony Campbell	PTS	4	15/08/1990	(United States) Peony Park, Omaha, Nebraska	
Loss	12-8-1	(United States) Steve Langley	PTS	6	09/06/1990	(United States) Kansas City Memorial Hall, Kansas City, Kansas	
Win	2-18-3	(United States) Jeff Gettemy	TKO	3	19/05/1990	(United States) Nebraska State Fair, Lincoln, Nebraska	
Win	19-26-1	(United States) Anthony Campbell	PTS	4	30/04/1990	(United States) Peony Park, Omaha, Nebraska	
Win	0-3	(United States) Jerry Williamson	KO	2	21/02/1990	(United States) Omaha, Nebraska	
Win	12-36-3	(United States) Jesse Abrams	PTS	4	05/12/1989	(United States) Carter Lake, Iowa	
Win	1-1-1	(United States) Isaac Quarless	TKO	1	24/07/1989	(United States) Omaha, Nebraska	

== See also ==
- List of boxing triple champions
