= Mario Veit =

German boxer (born 1973)

Personal information
- Nationality: German
- Born: 22 December 1973 (age 52) Lauchhammer, Bezirk Cottbus, East Germany
- Height: 192 cm (6 ft 4 in)
- Weight: Super middleweight

Boxing career
- Stance: Orthodox

Boxing record
- Total fights: 53
- Wins: 49
- Win by KO: 23
- Losses: 4

Mario Veit (born 22 December 1973) is a German former professional boxer. He is a former European Union super middleweight champion and multiple time world title challenger.

== Professional career ==
Veit went undefeated in his first 30 fights, until losing to Joe Calzaghe via first-round stoppage in 2001, in a bid for the WBO super middleweight title. A fifteen-fight win streak followed, during which Veit won the European Union super middleweight title in 2003. Veit was granted a second chance at Calzaghe and his title in 2005, but was again stopped in six rounds. In 2006, Veit became the first to defeat Jürgen Brähmer. However, in the same year, a third loss for Veit came against Denis Inkin, who stopped him in seven rounds. Veit's final professional fight was a rematch against Brähmer in 2007, which ended in a fourth-round knockout victory for Brähmer.

== Professional boxing record ==
53 fights	49 wins	4 losses
By knockout	23	4
By decision	26	0

No.	Result	Record	Opponent	Type	Round, time	Date	Location	Notes
53	Loss	49–4	Jürgen Brähmer	KO	4 (12), 0:47	15 Sep 2007	Stadthalle, Rostock, Germany	For WBO Inter-Continental super middleweight title
52	Win	49–3	Antonio Valentín Ochoa	UD	6	28 Apr 2007	König Pilsener Arena, Oberhausen, Germany	
51	Loss	48–3	Denis Inkin	KO	7 (12), 1:52	21 Oct 2006	Brandberge Halle, Halle an der Saale, Germany	Lost WBC International super middleweight title
50	Win	48–2	Jürgen Brähmer	MD	12	27 May 2006	Zenith, Munich, Germany	Won WBC International super middleweight title
49	Win	47–2	Jevgēņijs Andrejevs	UD	8	11 Mar 2006	Color Line Arena, Hamburg, Germany	
48	Win	46–2	Gusmyr Perdomo	MD	8	22 Oct 2005	Brandberge Halle, Halle an der Saale, Germany	
47	Loss	45–2	Joe Calzaghe	TKO	6 (12), 2:18	7 May 2005	Volkswagenhalle, Braunschweig, Germany	For WBO super middleweight title
46	Win	45–1	Charles Brewer	TKO	9 (12), 0:36	6 Nov 2004	Erdgas Arena, Riesa, Germany	Retained WBO interim super middleweight title
45	Win	44–1	Lolenga Mock	UD	8	21 Sep 2004	Universum Gym, Hamburg, Germany	
44	Win	43–1	Kabary Salem	SD	12	8 May 2004	Arena Westfalenhalle, Dortmund, Germany	Won inaugural WBO interim super middleweight title
43	Win	42–1	Sergey Karanevich	UD	10	2 Mar 2004	Universum Gym, Hamburg, Germany	
42	Win	41–1	Eliseo Nogueira	UD	8	18 Oct 2003	Color Line Arena, Hamburg, Germany	
41	Win	40–1	Antonio Brancalion	UD	8	12 Jul 2003	Wilhelm-Dopatka-Halle, Leverkusen, Germany	
40	Win	39–1	José María Guerrero	UD	10	26 Apr 2003	Sport and Congress Center, Schwerin, Germany	Won inaugural European Union super middleweight title
39	Win	38–1	Ramón Arturo Britez	UD	8	8 Mar 2003	Preussag Arena, Hanover, Germany	
38	Win	37–1	Malik Dziarra	TKO	9 (12)	21 Dec 2002	Lausitz Arena, Cottbus, Germany	Won IBF Inter-Continental super middleweight title
37	Win	36–1	Ramdane Serdjane	UD	8	12 Oct 2002	Sport and Congress Center, Schwerin, Germany	
36	Win	35–1	Juraj Ondříčko	TKO	1 (?)	17 Aug 2002	Estrel Comvention Center, Berlin, Germany	
35	Win	34–1	Gábor Halász	TKO	7 (8)	20 Apr 2002	Stoczniowiec Olivia Arena, Gdańsk, Poland	
34	Win	33–1	Dan Sheehan	UD	8	8 Feb 2002	Volkswagenhalle, Braunschweig, Germany	
33	Win	32–1	Talal Santiago	TKO	4 (?)	15 Dec 2001	Estrel Convention Center, Berlin, Germany	
32	Win	31–1	Ahmet Öner	UD	8	21 Jul 2001	Tivoli Eissporthalle, Aachen, Germany	
31	Loss	30–1	Joe Calzaghe	TKO	1 (12), 1:52	28 Apr 2001	Cardiff International Arena, Cardiff, Wales	For WBO super middleweight title
30	Win	30–0	Carl Cockerham	TKO	4 (?)	16 Dec 2000	Grugahalle, Essen, Germany	
29	Win	29–0	Errol McDonald	TKO	3 (8)	12 Aug 2000	Wembley Conference Centre, London, England	
28	Win	28–0	Glenn Odem	TKO	5 (?)	1 Apr 2000	Estrel Convention Center, Berlin, Germany	
27	Win	27–0	Rico Cason	KO	2 (8)	29 Jan 2000	MEN Arena, Manchester, England	
26	Win	26–0	Rob Bleakley	PTS	8	4 Dec 1999	Stadionsporthalle, Hanover, Germany	
25	Win	25–0	Ray Domenge	UD	12	23 Oct 1999	Ballsporthalle, Frankfurt, Germany	Won vacant WBO Inter-Continental super middleweight title
24	Win	24–0	Jon Penn	TKO	3 (8), 1:52	26 Jun 1999	London Arena, London, England	
23	Win	23–0	Mario Lupp	TKO	5 (8)	22 May 1999	Sportpalace, Budapest, Hungary	
22	Win	22–0	Mukadi Manda	TKO	6 (8), 1:55	3 Apr 1999	Stadthalle, Bremen, Germany	
21	Win	21–0	João Cabreiro	TKO	1 (8), 1:50	13 Mar 1999	Hansehalle, Lübeck, Germany	
20	Win	20–0	Jorge Sclarandi	UD	10	30 Jan 1999	Stadthalle, Cottbus, Germany	
19	Win	19–0	Branko Šobot	UD	10	14 Nov 1998	Circus Krone, Munich, Germany	Won vacant German International super middleweight title
18	Win	18–0	Steve Fisher	UD	8	3 Oct 1998	Prinz-Garden Halle, Augsburg, Germany	
17	Win	17–0	Patrice Cord'Homme	KO	8 (?)	5 Jun 1998	Sporthalle Wandsbek, Hamburg, Germany	
16	Win	16–0	Jerry Williams	PTS	8	2 May 1998	Hansehalle, Lübeck, Germany	
15	Win	15–0	Allaoua Anki	KO	3 (?)	7 Mar 1998	Sartory Saele, Cologne, Germany	
14	Win	14–0	Tracy Barrios	TKO	6 (?)	17 Jan 1998	Sport und Erholungszentrum, Berlin, Germany	
13	Win	13–0	Cliff Nellon	PTS	6	13 Dec 1997	Sporthalle Alsterdorf, Hamburg, Germany	
12	Win	12–0	Fermín Chirino	PTS	8	11 Oct 1997	Stadthalle, Cottbus, Germany	
11	Win	11–0	Jaroslav Cepicky	KO	6 (?)	7 Sep 1997	Universum Gym, Hamburg, Germany	
10	Win	10–0	Philip Houthoofdt	TKO	2 (?)	27 Jun 1997	Oberrheinhalle, Offenburg, Germany	
9	Win	9–0	Stanley Witteling	PTS	6	26 Apr 1997	Hallenstadion, Zurich, Switzerland	
8	Win	8–0	Tony Kikanga	KO	2 (?)	12 Apr 1997	Eurogress, Aachen, Germany	
7	Win	7–0	Todd Collins	TKO	1 (?)	15 Feb 1997	Stadthalle, Cottbus, Germany	
6	Win	6–0	Guy Stanford	PTS	6	7 Sep 1996	Stadthalle, Cottbus, Germany	
5	Win	5–0	Donnie Penelton	PTS	4	13 Jul 1996	Grugahalle, Essen, Germany	
4	Win	4–0	Frank Böhme	TKO	2 (?)	4 May 1996	Sport und Erholungszentrum, Berlin, Germany	
3	Win	3–0	Lester Yarbrough	PTS	4	16 Mar 1996	Deutschlandhalle, Berlin, Germany	
2	Win	2–0	Ferousi Ilunga	TKO	1 (?)	10 Feb 1996	Stadthalle, Cottbus, Germany	
1	Win	1–0	Frank Wuestenberghs	TKO	4 (4)	23 Sep 1995	Saaltheater Geulen, Aachen, Germany	

Achievements
Preceded by Jürgen Brähmer	WBC International super middleweight champion May 27 – October 21, 2006	Succeeded by Denis Inkin
World boxing titles
New title	WBO super middleweight champion Interim title 8 May 2004 – 7 May 2005; Lost bid for full title	Vacant Title next held by John Ryder
