= Ruben Eduardo Acosta =

Argentine boxer (born 1978)

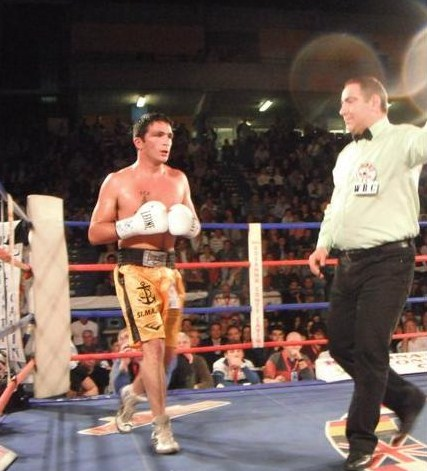

Personal information
- Nationality: Argentine
- Born: 21 July 1978 (age 48) Florencio Varela, Buenos Aires
- Weight: Cruiserweight

Boxing career
- Stance: Orthodox

Boxing record
- Total fights: 73
- Wins: 40
- Win by KO: 13
- Losses: 18
- Draws: 5
- No contests: 0

Ruben Edaurdo Acosta (born 21 July 1978) is an Argentine professional boxer. He is a former WBO NABO cruiserweight champion.

== Biography ==
On 20 May 2005, Acosta had a 10-0-1KOs pro record when he faced top contender Mariano Natalio Carrera for the vacated WBA Fedelatin middleweight title, Carrera knocked Acosta down twice then won a unanimous decision. The final score was 100-92 100-93 100–93. After the loss against Carrera, Acosta won against Ramon Patricio Vargas and Nestor Fabian Casanova. On 15 November 2006, Acosta fought former world champion Anthony Mundine in Entertainment Centre, Newcastle, New South Wales, Australia. The fight ended in a KO in the four round when Acosta failed to beat the count after a left hook to the liver. Acosta was able to get back up after the fight was stopped, only to fall once more. Acosta had a four win streak before losing to future WBO Super middleweight champ Karoly Balzsay by unanimous decision, with all three judges scoring 119–109. On 2 February 2008, Acosta fought former two-time WBA light middleweight world champion Julio César Vásquez with Acosta winning by KO in the first round with a bodyshot. Acosta earned a five win streak, including a win over formerly undefeated Eduardo Cardoso.

== Stieglitz vs Acosta ==
On 9 January 2010, Acosta was defeated by WBO Super Middleweight Champion Robert Stieglitz via TKO5.

== Smith vs Acosta ==
October 26, 2013, Acosta fought against Callum Smith for the vacant WBC International super middleweight title, losing by KO on the 6 round.

=== Regional titles ===
- WBO Latino Super middleweight Champion
- WBA Fedelatin Middleweight Champion
- WBC Mundo Hispano Middleweight Champion
- South American Super Middleweight Champion
- WBO NABO Cruiserweight Champion

=== Professional Boxing record (incomplete) ===
36 Wins (13 knockouts), 16 Losses, 5 Draw
Res.	Record	Opponent	Type	Rd., Time	Date	Location	Notes
Loss	36-16-5	(Armenia) Vartan Avetisyan	UD	12 (12)	2018-06-16	Ballhaus Forum, Munich, Germany	
Win	36-15-5	(Argentina) Cesar Hernan Reynoso	PTS	10 (10)	2018-03-03	Sheraton Mar del Plata Hotel, Mar del Plata, Argentina	
Win	35-15-5	(Argentina) Job Roberto Joel Mazeo	KO	1 (10)	2017-10-29	Club Once Unidos, Mar del Plata, Argentina	
Win	34-15-5	(Argentina) Juan Rodolfo Juarez	UD	10 (10)	2017-06-10	GAP Disco, Mar del Plata, Argentina	
Win	33-15-5	(Argentina) Arnaldo Alcides Benitez	UD	6 (6)	2017-02-25	Club Atletico Quilmes, Mar del Plata, Argentina	
Loss	32-15-5	(Denmark) Lolenga Mock	UD	10 (10)	2016-12-03	Ceres Arena, Aarhus, Denmark	
Win	32-14-5	(Argentina) Mauricio Roberto Caceda	TKO	1 (12)	2016-11-11	Club Atlético Florentino Ameghino, Ameghino, Argentina	
Loss	31-14-5	(Germany) Tyron Zeuge	UD	10 (10)	2016-04-09	MBS Arena, Potsdam, Germany	
Loss	31-13-5	(Germany) Juergen Doberstein	UD	12 (12)	2015-12-05	Saarlandhalle, Saarbrücken, Germany	
Win	31-12-5	(Argentina) Pablo Daniel Zamora Nievas	TKO	2 (12)	2015-09-11	Club Independiente, Bahía Blanca, Buenos Aires, Argentina	
Loss	30-12-5	(Denmark) Patrick Nielsen	UD	10 (10)	2015-05-02	Frederiksberg-Hallerne, Frederiksberg, Denmark	
Win	30-11-5	(Argentina) Rolando Wenceslao Mansilla	UD	12 (12)	2015-01-30	Sheraton Mar del Plata Hotel, Mar del Plata, Argentina	
Win	29-11-5	(Argentina) Mauricio Roberto Caceda	UD	6 (6)	2014-12-27	Polideportivo CEF Nº 40, Mercedes, Argentina	
Loss	28-11-5	(Paraguay) Isidro Ranoni Prieto	UD	10 (10)	2014-10-24	El Porvenir, Quilmes, Argentina	
Loss	28-10-5	(Russia) Maxim Vlasov	KO	7 (10)	2014-07-26	Kipsala Exhibition Centre, Riga, Latvia	For vacant WBC Baltic light heavyweight title
Win	28-9-5	(Argentina) Arnaldo Alcides Benitez	UD	10 (10)	2014-05-24	Club Once Unidos, Mar del Plata, Argentina	
Loss	27-9-5	(United Kingdom) Callum Smith	KO	6 (10)	2013-10-26	(United Kingdom) Motorpoint Arena, Sheffield, England	For vacant WBC International super middleweight title
Win	27-8-5	(Argentina) Pablo Daniel Zamora Nievas	TKO	3 (8)	2013-09-21	Club Once Unidos, Mar del Plata, Argentina	
Win	26-8-5	(Brazil) Everaldo Praxedes	TKO	7 (12)	2013-01-19	Adler Max Vinhedo, Itatiba, Brazil	Retain South American super middleweight title
Win	25-8-5	(Argentina) Jorge Ariel Garcia	UD	6 (6)	2012-09-29	Club Once Unidos, Mar del Plata, Argentina	
Loss	24-8-5	(Colombia) Alexander Brand	UD	10 (10)	2012-07-19	Coliseo Bernardo Caraballo, Cartagena, Colombia	For WBC Latino super middleweight title
Loss	24-7-5	(Argentina) Ezequiel Osvaldo Maderna	UD	12 (12)	2012-05-26	Club Platense, La Plata, Argentina	For interim WBO Latino super middleweight title
Loss	24-6-5	(Italy) Andrea Di Luisa	UD	10 (10)	2011-03-05	PalaMalè, Viterbo, Italy	For vacant WBC International Silver super middleweight title
Loss	24-5-5	(Argentina) Ezequiel Osvaldo Maderna	UD	10 (10)	2011-03-05	Club Platense, La Plata, Argentina	For Argentina (FAB) super middleweight title
Win	24-4-5	(Argentina) Lucas Damian Molina	TKO	5 (10)	2010-12-18	Club Once Unidos, Mar del Plata, Argentina	
Loss	23-4-5	(Germany) Robert Stieglitz	TKO	5 (12)	2010-01-09	Bordelandhalle, Magdeburg, Germany	For WBO super middleweight title
Win	23-3-5	(Argentina) Jose Emilio Mazurier	MD	6 (6)	2009-10-09	Club Atletico Quilmes, Mar del Plata, Argentina	
Win	22-3-5	(Argentina) Gustavo Javier Kapusi	UD	12 (12)	2009-04-25	Gimnasio Municipal, Cutral Có, Argentina	
Win	21-3-5	(Brazil) Eduardo Cardoso	RTD	9 (12)	2009-01-23	Club Atletico Quilmes, Mar del Plata, Argentina	
Win	20-3-5	(Argentina) Nestor Fabian Casanova	TKO	6 (10)	2008-11-29	Club Social y Dep. 12 de Octubre, Benavídez, Argentina	
Win	19-3-5	(Argentina) Lucas Damian Molina	UD	6 (6)	2008-06-06	Club Atletico Quilmes, Mar del Plata, Argentina	
Win	18-3-5	(Argentina) Julio César Vásquez	KO	1 (12)	2008-02-02	Polideportivo Islas Malvinas, Mar del Plata, Argentina	
Win	17-3-5	(Argentina) Alejandro Oscar Correa	KO	2 (8)	2007-12-21	Club Atletico Quilmes, Mar del Plata, Argentina	
Loss	16-3-5	(Hungary) Karoly Balzsay	UD	12 (12)	2007-11-24	Freiberger Arena, Dresden, Germany	For vacant WBO Inter-Continental super middleweight title
Win	16-2-5	(Argentina) Jose Emilio Mazurier	KO	1 (12)	2007-07-14	Club Juventud, Malabrigo, Argentina	Retain WBO Latino super middleweight title
Win	15-2-5	(Argentina) Francisco Antonio Mora	UD	12 (12)	2007-04-21	Luna Park, Buenos Aires, Argentina	Won WBO Latino super middleweight title
Draw	14-2-5	(Argentina) Jose Alberto Clavero	PTS	10 (10)	2007-02-23	Polideportivo Municipal Nº 2, Río Cuarto, Argentina	
Win	14-2-4	(Argentina) Luis Daniel Parada	TKO	1 (8)	2007-01-27	Patinodromo Municipal, Mar del Plata, Argentina	
Win	13-2-4	(Argentina) Lucas Damian Molina	UD	6 (6)	2007-01-13	Club Atletico Quilmes, Mar del Plata, Argentina	
Loss	12-2-4	(Australia) Anthony Mundine	KO	4 (10)	2006-11-15	Entertainment Centre, Newcastle, Australia	
Win	12-1-4	(Argentina) Nestor Fabian Casanova	UD	12 (12)	2006-08-19	Club Atletico Adelante, Reconquista, Argentina	
Draw	11-1-4	(Argentina) Pablo Daniel Zamora Nievas	PTS	6 (6)	2006-07-24	Gimnasio Municipal, Río Colorado, Argentina	
Win	11-1-3	(Argentina) Ramon Patricio Vargas	UD	4 (4)	2006-01-27	Club Atletico Quilmes, Mar del Plata, Argentina	
Loss	10-1-3	(Argentina) Mariano Natalio Carrera	UD	10 (10)	2005-05-20	Club Atletico Newell's Old Boys, Rosario, Argentina	For vacant WBA Fedelatin middleweight title
Win	10-0-3	(Argentina) Nestor Fabian Casanova	UD	6 (6)	2005-02-27	Estadio F.A.B., Buenos Aires, Argentina	
Win	9-0-3	(Argentina) Jorge Ariel Garcia	UD	12 (12)	2004-10-08	Mar del Plata, Argentina	Retain WBC Mundo Hispano middleweight title
Win	9-0-3	(Argentina) Ramon Arturo Britez	SD	10 (10)	2004-07-09	Centro de Educacion Física, Mar del Plata, Argentina	
Win	9-0-3	(Argentina) Jose Luis Loyola	UD	12 (12)	2004-02-20	Centro de Educacion Física, Mar del Plata, Argentina	Won WBC Mundo Hispano middleweight title
Win	8-0-3	(Argentina) Claudio Anibal Olivera	UD	4 (4)	2004-01-17	Club Atletico Mar del Plata, Mar del Plata, Argentina	
