= Ion (rapper) =

Ion Real Deal
- Born: Omar Nguale Ilunga; 1984 (age 41–42)
- Origin: Rome, Italy
- Genres: Hip hop, Gangsta rap
- Occupations: rapper, boxer, actor
- Years active: 2009–present

Omar Nguale Ilunga best known as Ion Real Deal (born 1984) is an Italian rapper, boxer and actor, born to a Tunisian mother and a Congolese father.

He sings in Italian and French.

== Discography ==
=== Solo albums ===
- 2009 – Forever Free
- 2012 – REAL DEAL

=== With Goodfellas ===
- 2010 - Crew Internazionale
- 2014 - GoodFellas vol.1

== Filmography ==
- 2011 - Tiberio Mitri - Il Campione e la miss
- 2013 - Tulpa - Perdizioni mortali

== Boxing ==
On 23 July 2022, he defeated Patrick López via unanimous decision for the WBC FECARBOX middleweight title.
