= Stjepan Božić =

Croatian boxer

Personal information
- Nationality: Croatian
- Born: 23 October 1974 (age 51) Brežice, SR Slovenia, SFR Yugoslavia
- Height: 5 ft 10 1/2 in (179 cm)
- Weight: super middleweight

Boxing career
- Stance: Orthodox

Boxing record
- Total fights: 40
- Wins: 29
- Win by KO: 19
- Losses: 11
Medal record
Men's Boxing
Representing Croatia
European Amateur Championships
Silver medal – second place	2000 Tampere	Middleweight

Stjepan Božić (born October 23, 1974) is a Croatian super middleweight boxer. He won the title of World Boxing Foundation (WBFo) world champion on June 6, 2005, fighting against Australian Nader Hamdan. He successfully defended the title on December 2 in the same year versus Argentinian Julio Vasquez.

He won the WBA intercontinental title versus Danish Lolenga Mock. After several defenses of the WBA intercontinental title, Božić landed a shot at the WBA world title, losing to Dimitri Sartison by sixth round TKO.

== Personal life ==
Stjepan married Angelina in 2005 and they had two children together, Dominik and Matej. In April 2010 Stjepan announced that he was getting divorced.

== Professional boxing record ==
29 Wins (19 knockouts, 10 decisions), 11 Losses (8 knockouts, 3 decisions), 0 Draws
Res.	Record	Opponent	Type	Round	Date	Location	Notes
Loss	29–11	(Poland) Michal Gerlecki	TKO	4 (8)	2015-03-14	Lubin, Poland	
Loss	29–10	(Poland) Marek Matyja	TKO	3 (8)	2015-01-31	Toruń, Poland	
Loss	29–9	(Germany) Tyron Zeuge	RTD	5 (12)	2014-12-06	Oldenburg, Germany	For IBF International super middleweight title
Win	29–8	(Slovakia) Miroslav Kvocka	UD	6	2014-08-03	Novalja, Croatia	
Loss	28–8	(Russia) Fedor Chudinov	RTD	5 (12)	2014-03-23	Noginsk, Russia	For vacant WBC CIS and Slovenian Boxing Bureau (CISBB) super middleweight title
Win	28–7	(Georgia (country)) Paata Varduashvili	RTD	4 (8)	2013-12-19	Abu Dhabi, United Arab Emirates	
Win	27–7	(Croatia) Edo Čavrk	TKO	2 (8)	2013-11-24	Zagreb, Croatia	
Loss	26–7	(United Kingdom) James DeGale	RTD	4 (12)	2013-06-08	Greenhithe, United Kingdom	For WBC Silver super middleweight title
Win	26–6	(Croatia) Gordan Glišić	TKO	2 (8)	2012-11-23	Pula, Croatia	
Win	25–6	(Serbia) Miša Nikolić	KO	2 (6)	2012-03-24	Nikšić, Montenegro	
Loss	24–6	(Germany) Henry Weber	SD	8	2011-10-01	Neubrandenburg, Germany	
Loss	24–5	(Germany) Arthur Abraham	TKO	2 (10)	2011-02-12	Mülheim, Germany	
Win	24–4	(Hungary) Gyula Gaspar	TKO	2 (8)	2010-04-09	Ljubljana, Slovenia	
Loss	23–4	(Germany) Dimitri Sartison	TKO	6 (12)	2009-11-21	Kiel, Germany	For vacant WBA World super middleweight title
Win	23–3	(Slovakia) Joseph Sovijus	TKO	3 (8)	2008-12-17	Sarajevo, Bosnia and Herzegovina	
Win	22–3	(Armenia) Roman Aramian	UD	12	2008-07-25	Novalja, Croatia	Retained WBA Inter-Continental super middleweight title
Win	21–3	(Belgium) Djamel Selini	TKO	8 (12)	2008-03-29	Široki Brijeg, Bosnia and Herzegovina	Retained WBA Inter-Continental super middleweight title
Win	20–3	(Denmark) Lolenga Mock	UD	12	2007-08-02	Pag, Croatia	Won vacant WBA Inter-Continental super middleweight title
Win	19–3	(Slovakia) Stefan Stanko	TKO	3 (6)	2007-01-26	Rijeka, Croatia	
Loss	18–3	(Ukraine) Vitaliy Tsypko	TKO	2 (8)	2006-09-23	Wetzlar, Germany	
Loss	18–2	(Russia) David Gogiya	SD	8	2006-03-04	Oldenburg, Germany	
Win	18–1	(Argentina) Julio César Vásquez	RTD	7 (12)	2005-12-02	Zadar, Croatia	Retained World Boxing Foundation super middleweight title
Win	17–1	(Australia) Nader Hamdan	UD	12	2005-04-06	Zagreb, Croatia	Won vacant World Boxing Foundation super middleweight title
Win	16–1	(Romania) Octavian Stoica	DQ	2 (8)	2005-03-26	Besançon, France	
Win	15–1	(France) Wilfried Visee Rivelli	UD	8	2004-10-21	Levallois-Perret, France	
Win	14–1	(Portugal) Eliseo Nogueira	UD	8	2004-03-20	Lyon, France	
Win	13–1	(France) Karim Bennama	UD	8	2003-10-10	Marseille, France	
Win	12–1	(Portugal) Eliseo Nogueira	UD	8	2004-03-20	Levallois-Perret, France	
Win	11–1	(Hungary) Andras Lukats	KO	3 (6)	2003-05-03	Vukovar, Croatia	
Win	10–1	(France) Youssef Temsoury	TKO	6 (8)	2003-02-24	Levallois-Perret, France	
Win	9–1	(Slovakia) Stefan Stanko	TKO	3 (10)	2002-11-24	Rijeka, Croatia	
Win	8–1	(Armenia) Morahir Babayan	TKO	2 (8)	2002-07-13	Palavas-les-Flots, France	
Win	7–1	(Montenegro) Milojko Pivljanin	TKO	3 (6)	2002-04-13	Zagreb, Croatia	
Loss	6–1	(France) Aime Bafounta	PTS	8	2001-12-22	Orléans, France	
Win	6–0	(Colombia) Ricardo Simarra	UD	6	2001-09-15	Agadir, Morocco	
Win	5–0	(Slovakia) Stefan Stanko	TKO	3 (6)	2001-05-28	Levallois-Perret, France	
Win	4–0	(Italy) Giovanni Jemma	TKO	6	2001-04-01	Le Cannet, France	
Win	3–0	(Algeria) Karim Gherbi	TKO	4 (6)	2001-02-16	Mont-de-Marsan, France	
Win	2–0	(Algeria) Miloud Chinoun	TKO	4 (6)	2000-11-30	Élancourt, France	
Win	1–0	(Slovakia) Tibor Horvath	TKO	5 (6)	2000-09-16	Châteauroux, France	Professional debut
