= Gusmyr Perdomo =

Venezuelan boxer

Personal information
- Nickname: Azúcar Torpedo
- Born: September 7, 1977 (age 48) La Guaira, Venezuela
- Height: 6 ft 2 in (188 cm)
- Weight: Cruiserweight; Super middleweight

Boxing career
- Stance: Southpaw

Boxing record
- Total fights: 34
- Wins: 25
- Win by KO: 17
- Losses: 9

Gusmyr Perdomo (born September 7, 1977) is a Venezuelan professional boxer. Perdomo is perhaps best known for challenging Mikkel Kessler for the WBA super middleweight title in 2009. He has twice won the WBA Fedelatin super middleweight title, first in 2006 and again in 2008 against Héctor Javier Velazco.

== Amateur career ==
As an amateur, Perdomo fought 96 times, winning 85 and becoming a seven-time Venezuelan champion.

== Professional career ==
Perdomo made his professional debut on June 5, 2002, stopping Dominican Jose Diaz by TKO. In his next ten fights, Perdomo would go unbeaten, with half of his wins coming by knockout or stoppage. On October 22, 2005, Perdomo suffered his first defeat, against World champion, Mario Veit from Germany. Three wins later Perdomo won the WBA Fedelatin super middleweight title against Edison Francisco Guedes, a feat he would achieve again after vacating the title, when he defeated Hector Javier Velazco in 2008.

On September 12, 2009, Perdomo fought World Champion Mikkel Kessler at Messecenter Herning in Denmark. Kessler stopped Perdomo after four rounds.
