= Robert Stieglitz =

German boxer (born 1981)

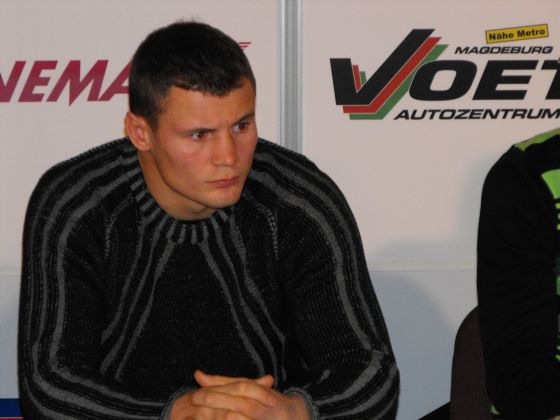
- Stieglitz in 2009

Personal information
- Nationality: German
- Born: Sergey Shtikhlits; 20 June 1981 (age 45) Yeysk, Krasnodar Krai, Russian SFSR, Soviet Union
- Height: 1.80 m (5 ft 11 in)
- Weight: Super-middleweight; Light-heavyweight

Boxing career
- Stance: Orthodox

Boxing record
- Total fights: 57
- Wins: 50
- Win by KO: 29
- Losses: 5
- Draws: 2

Sergey Shtikhlits (born 20 June 1981), best known as Robert Stieglitz, is a German former professional boxer who competed from 2001 to 2017. He held the WBO super-middleweight title twice between 2009 and 2014, and the European light-heavyweight title from 2016 to 2017.

== Early life ==
Stieglitz is part of the German diaspora that exists in Russia, and his original surname of Shtikhlits is a Russified version of the German surname Stieglitz, which he now uses. He himself has said that, even when living in Russia, he always felt foreign and he felt German. Stieglitz went to live in Germany as soon as he got the chance.

== Amateur career ==
Stieglitz had an amateur record of 80 wins and 10 losses.

== Professional career ==
After accumulating a record of 31-1, Stieglitz then suffered his second loss to Mexico's Librado Andrade in eight rounds at the Morongo Casino Resort & Spa, Cabazon, California in an IBF super-middleweight title eliminator. Stieglitz won the vacant WBC International super-middleweight title on December 9, 2008 in Sölden (Austria) to previously unbeaten Lukas Wilaschek.

=== WBO super-middleweight champion ===
Stieglitz vacated the WBC International on 22 June 2009, to fight Karoly Balzsay for the WBO super-middleweight title. At the end of round ten, as a groggy and beaten Balzsay barely wobbled back to his corner, Balzsay's trainer Fritz Sdinek called for help and Balzsay was quickly taken from the ring to the hospital on a stretcher with his neck in a neck brace. Stieglitz recorded a fifth-round technical knockout of Ruben Eduardo Acosta to retain his WBO super-middleweight title. The fight was stopped at 1:48 to give Stieglitz the victory in his first defense. On April 17, 2010, he successfully defended his title in Magdeburg against Eduard Gutknecht.

Stieglitz retained his title with a hard-fought unanimous decision over his Mexican challenger Enrique Ornelas, Andrade's younger brother, at the Freiberger Arena in Dresden. It was a slow start of both fights and little less action but Stieglitz started this fight in style in the second round. The German champion progressed the fight with his sharp jab to give Ornelas some trouble but the Mexican also landed some precise and dangerous shots towards Stieglitz.

He then made successful defenses against Khoren Gevor and Henry Weber. Stieglitz was supposed to face former three-time titleholder Mikkel Kessler in his hometown of Copenhagen, Denmark to defend his 168-pound belt on April 14, 2012 but Kessler pulled out due to injury. Instead, he defended the title with a unanimous decision win over Nader Hamdan on May 5, 2012.

=== Stieglitz vs. Arthur Abraham trilogy ===
Stieglitz then lost the WBO super-middleweight title to Arthur Abraham on August 25, 2012. He would rebound with a win over Michal Nieroda on January 26, 2013 before avenging his loss to Abraham and regaining the WBO super-middleweight title with a fourth-round knockout on March 23, 2013.

His first defense in his second reign as WBO super-middleweight champion was a tenth-round TKO win over Yuzo Kiyota on July 13, 2013. The result was originally announced as a Technical Decision win for Stieglitz, but was changed to a TKO after the Bund Deutscher Berufsboxer examined the ending of the fight and concluded that Stieglitz did not accidentally headbutt Kiyota. The change was approved by the WBO.

His second defense in his second reign as WBO Champion was against Isaac Ekpo on October 19, 2013. Stieglitz won via unanimous decision.

A rubber match with Arthur Abraham took place on March 1, 2014, with the WBO super-middleweight title on the line once again. Stieglitz lost the bout via split decision.

=== Retirement ===
On 23 May 2017 he announced his retirement from professional boxing with a record of 50 wins, 5 losses and 2 draws. The retirement was injury-related, due to the various operations on his left hand and a shoulder injury which had not fully healed.

== Professional boxing record ==
57 fights	50 wins	5 losses
By knockout	29	3
By decision	20	2
By disqualification	1	0
Draws	2	

No.	Result	Record	Opponent	Type	Round, time	Date	Location	Notes
57	Draw	50–5–2	Nikola Sjekloća	SD	12	18 Mar 2017	Arena Leipzig, Leipzig, Germany	Retained European light-heavyweight title
56	Win	50–5–1	Mehdi Amar	UD	12	12 Nov 2016	GETEC Arena, Magdeburg, Germany	Won European light-heavyweight title
55	Win	49–5–1	Ricardo Marcelo Ramallo	TKO	5 (8), 2:47	5 Mar 2016	Home Monitoring Aréna, Plzeň, Czech Republic	
54	Win	48–5–1	Robert Rosenberg	RTD	2 (8), 3:00	17 Oct 2015	Hospůdka Eden, Ústí nad Labem, Czech Republic	
53	Loss	47–5–1	Arthur Abraham	TKO	6 (12), 1:14	18 Jul 2015	Gerry Weber Stadion, Halle, Germany	For WBO super-middleweight title
52	Draw	47–4–1	Felix Sturm	SD	12	8 Nov 2014	Porsche-Arena, Stuttgart, Germany	
51	Win	47–4	Sergey Khomitsky	TKO	10 (12), 0:12	26 Jul 2014	Anhalt Arena, Dessau, Germany	Won vacant WBO Inter-Continental super-middleweight title
50	Loss	46–4	Arthur Abraham	SD	12	1 Mar 2014	GETEC Arena, Magdeburg, Germany	Lost WBO super-middleweight title
49	Win	46–3	Isaac Ekpo	UD	12	19 Oct 2013	Leipzig Trade Fair, Leipzig, Germany	Retained WBO super-middleweight title
48	Win	45–3	Yuzo Kiyota	TKO	10 (12), 0:40	13 Jul 2013	EnergieVerbund Arena, Dresden, Germany	Retained WBO super-middleweight title
47	Win	44–3	Arthur Abraham	TKO	4 (12), 0:01	23 Mar 2013	GETEC Arena, Magdeburg, Germany	Won WBO super-middleweight title
46	Win	43–3	Michal Nieroda	KO	3 (8), 1:45	26 Jan 2013	Pabellón del Bon Pastor, Barcelona, Spain	
45	Loss	42–3	Arthur Abraham	UD	12	25 Aug 2012	O2 World, Berlin, Germany	Lost WBO super-middleweight title
44	Win	42–2	Nader Hamdan	UD	12	5 May 2012	Messe, Erfurt, Germany	Retained WBO super-middleweight title
43	Win	41–2	Henry Weber	UD	12	14 Jan 2012	Baden-Arena, Offenburg, Germany	Retained WBO super-middleweight title
42	Win	40–2	Khoren Gevor	DQ	10 (12), 2:45	9 Apr 2011	Bördelandhalle, Magdeburg, Germany	Retained WBO super-middleweight title; Gevor disqualified for repeated fouls
41	Win	39–2	Enrique Ornelas	UD	12	20 Nov 2010	Freiberger Arena, Dresden, Germany	Retained WBO super-middleweight title
40	Win	38–2	Eduard Gutknecht	UD	12	17 Apr 2010	Bördelandhalle, Magdeburg, Germany	Retained WBO super-middleweight title
39	Win	37–2	Ruben Eduardo Acosta	TKO	5 (12), 1:48	9 Jan 2010	Bördelandhalle, Magdeburg, Germany	Retained WBO super-middleweight title
38	Win	36–2	Károly Balzsay	TKO	11 (12), 0:12	22 Aug 2009	SYMA Sports and Conference Centre, Budapest, Hungary	Won WBO super-middleweight title
37	Win	35–2	Jindrich Velecky	UD	10	15 May 2009	Bördelandhalle, Magdeburg, Germany	
36	Win	34–2	Dmitri Protkunas	TKO	4 (8), 1:47	10 Jan 2009	Bördelandhalle, Magdeburg, Germany	
35	Win	33–2	Lukas Wilaschek	SD	12	9 Dec 2008	Freizeit Arena, Sölden, Austria	Won vacant WBC International super-middleweight title
34	Win	32–2	Fawaz Nasir	TKO	5 (8), 1:35	11 Jul 2008	Rundturnhalle, Cuxhaven, Germany	
33	Loss	31–2	Librado Andrade	TKO	8 (12), 1:53	22 Mar 2008	Morongo Casino Resort & Spa, Cabazon, California, US	
32	Win	31–1	William Gare	UD	10	13 Oct 2007	Hermann-Gieseler-Halle, Magdeburg, Germany	
31	Win	30–1	Marlon Hayes	UD	8	2 Jun 2007	Boardwalk Hall, Atlantic City, New Jersey, US	
30	Loss	29–1	Alejandro Berrio	TKO	3 (12), 2:40	3 Mar 2007	StadtHalle, Rostock, Germany	For vacant IBF super-middleweight title
29	Win	29–0	Eric Howard	KO	5 (8), 2:50	10 Oct 2006	T-Mobile Arena, Prague, Czech Republic	
28	Win	28–0	Alejandro Berrio	TKO	11 (12), 0:35	3 Dec 2005	Bördelandhalle, Magdeburg, Germany	
27	Win	27–0	Francis Cheka	TKO	5 (12), 2:30	9 Jul 2005	Life Sportpark Herrenkrug, Magdeburg, Germany	Retained IBF Inter-Continental super-middleweight title
26	Win	26–0	Lawrence Chapman	RTD	11 (12), 3:00	16 Apr 2005	Bördelandhalle, Magdeburg, Germany	Retained IBF Inter-Continental super-middleweight title
25	Win	25–0	Alexander Zaitsev	UD	12	11 Dec 2004	Lausitz Arena, Cottbus, Germany	Retained IBF Inter-Continental super-middleweight title
24	Win	24–0	Yuri Tsarenka	UD	12	18 Sep 2004	Hermann-Gieseler-Halle, Magdeburg, Germany	Retained IBF Inter-Continental super-middleweight title
23	Win	23–0	Djamel Selini	UD	12	5 Jun 2004	Maritim Hotel, Magdeburg, Germany	Won vacant IBF Inter-Continental super-middleweight title
22	Win	22–0	Galen Brown	TKO	7 (12), 2:37	21 Feb 2004	Ballhaus-Arena, Aschersleben, Germany	Won vacant IBF Youth super-middleweight title
21	Win	21–0	Marcin Radola	TKO	1 (6)	29 Nov 2003	Lausitz-Arena, Cottbus, Germany	
20	Win	20–0	Yuri Barashian	UD	10	20 Sep 2003	Maritim Hotel, Magdeburg, Germany	Retained IBF Youth light-heavyweight title
19	Win	19–0	Roman Aramyan	UD	10	5 Jul 2003	Anhalt Arena, Dessau, Germany	Retained IBF Youth light-heavyweight title
18	Win	18–0	Jeno Novak	KO	4 (8)	25 Apr 2003	Maritim Hotel, Magdeburg, Germany	
17	Win	17–0	Dzianis Salomka	UD	10	1 Mar 2003	Ballhaus-Arena, Aschersleben, Germany	Retained IBF Youth light-heavyweight title
16	Win	16–0	Sergey Karanevich	UD	10	31 Oct 2002	Maritim Hotel, Magdeburg, Germany	Won vacant IBF Youth light-heavyweight title
15	Win	15–0	Talal Santiago	TKO	3 (8), 2:10	21 Sep 2002	Bördelandhalle, Magdeburg, Germany	
14	Win	14–0	Pavel Cirok	TKO	4 (6), 2:00	8 Jun 2002	Anhalt Arena, Dessau, Germany	
13	Win	13–0	Marius Mihai Dumitru	KO	2 (6)	11 May 2002	Circus Krone Building, Munich, Germany	
12	Win	12–0	Laszlo Dolgos	TKO	3 (6), 1:20	13 Apr 2002	Harzlandhalle, Ilsenburg, Germany	
11	Win	11–0	Bruce Oezbek	UD	6	16 Mar 2002	Bördelandhalle, Magdeburg, Germany	
10	Win	10–0	Laszlo Dolgos	TKO	3 (4)	23 Feb 2002	Neu-Isenburg, Germany	
9	Win	9–0	Terrence Paliso	TKO	2 (6)	5 Jan 2002	Bördelandhalle, Magdeburg, Germany	
8	Win	8–0	Roman Nikodem	KO	3 (6)	8 Dec 2001	Glaspalast, Dessau, Germany	
7	Win	7–0	Henry Mobio	PTS	4	15 Sep 2001	Telde, Canary Islands	
6	Win	6–0	Patrick Madzinga	TKO	2 (4), 2:35	7 Jul 2001	Maritim Hotel, Magdeburg, Germany	
5	Win	5–0	Ondrej Olah	TKO	2 (4)	22 Jun 2001	Salzgitter, Germany	
4	Win	4–0	Tomas Kugler	TKO	4 (4)	8 Jun 2001	Berlin, Germany	
3	Win	3–0	Karel Ferenc	KO	2 (4)	28 Apr 2001	Eisenbach, Germany	
2	Win	2–0	Pavel Veprek	KO	1 (4)	22 Apr 2001	Berlin, Germany	
1	Win	1–0	Petr Pokorny	UD	4	7 Apr 2001	Harzlandhalle, Ilsenburg, Germany	

Sporting positions
Regional boxing titles
New title	IBF Youth light-heavyweight champion 31 October 2002 – February 2004; Vacated	Vacant Title next held by Martin Nielsen
Vacant Title last held by Serhiy Rubis	IBF Youth super-middleweight champion 21 February 2004 – March 2004; Vacated	Vacant Title next held by Martin Nielsen
Vacant Title last held by Danilo Haussler	IBF Inter-Continental super-middleweight champion 5 June 2004 – 3 December 2005; Won eliminator for world title	Vacant Title next held by Joe Spina
Vacant Title last held by Denis Inkin	WBC International super-middleweight champion 9 December 2008 – August 2009; Vacated	Vacant Title next held by Adonis Stevenson
Vacant Title last held by Arthur Abraham	WBO Inter-Continental super-middleweight champion 26 July 2014 – August 2014; Vacated	Vacant Title next held by Vincent Feigenbutz
Preceded by Mehdi Amar	European light-heavyweight champion 12 November 2016 – 24 May 2017; Retired	Vacant
World boxing titles
Preceded by Károly Balzsay	WBO super-middleweight champion 22 August 2009 – 25 August 2012	Succeeded by Arthur Abraham
Preceded by Arthur Abraham	WBO super-middleweight champion 23 March 2013 – 1 March 2014	Succeeded by Arthur Abraham
