= Peony Park =

Former amusement park in Omaha, Nebraska, United States

- Interactive map of Peony Park
- Location: 7910 Cass Street (original); 1620 County Road "L"(last); Omaha, Nebraska, U.S.
- Coordinates: 41°16′00″N 096°02′24″W
- Opened: 1919
- Closed: 1994
- Owner: Joe Malec, Jerry Malec and Charles Malec
- Slogan: The Place to Party!!!

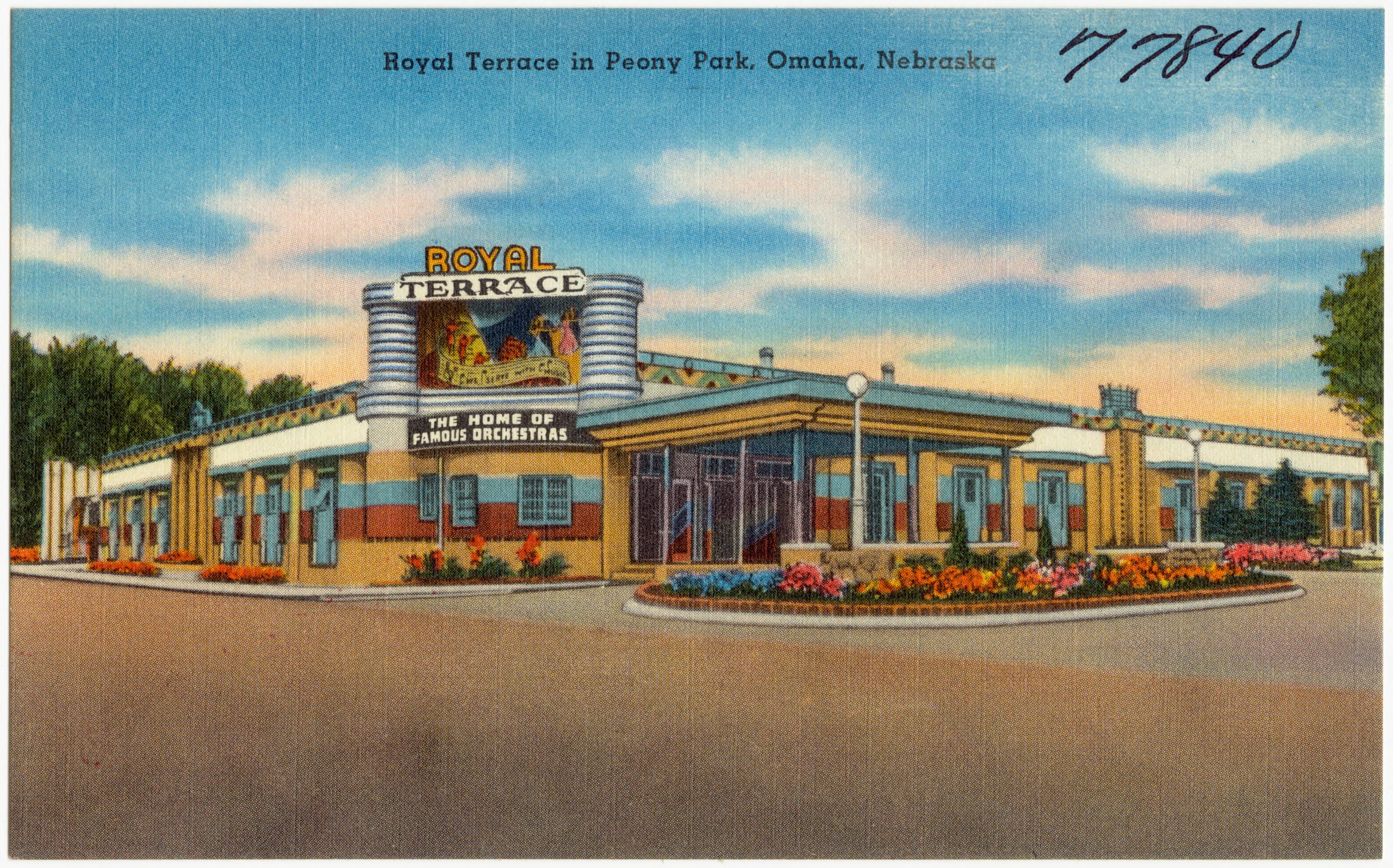
A postcard showing Royal Terrace in Peony Park, Omaha, Nebraska.

Peony Park was an amusement park located at North 78th and Cass Streets in Omaha, Nebraska. Founded in 1919, over the next seventy-five years the 35-acre (140,000 m^{2}) park included a 4.5-acre (18,000 m^{2}) pool, beach and waterslide, a ballroom that billed itself as "1 acre under one roof," an open-air dance area for 3000 dancers, amusement rides, and various sundries. The park closed in 1994. Throughout its existence the park maintained its status as Nebraska's largest amusement park.

== History ==
Peony Park was begun by local entrepreneurs Godfrey Malec, and brothers Jerry and Joe Sr. in 1919 with the help of investor Frank Srb, a family member and business man from Dodge, Nebraska. The brothers opened a gas station and restaurant on the Lincoln Highway. Carl Rosenfield's neighboring Peony Gardens were established 35 years earlier, in 1884, with 25 acres (100,000 m^{2}) of peonies in several hundred varieties. When the Gardens became a highway stop along the burgeoning Lincoln Highway, the Malec brothers added amusements to this already busy roadside attraction. The park became the official headquarters for the Lawrence Welk Band in the 1930s, which made it immensely popular. Other events included the Coca-Cola Date Night and Polka Days, and numerous appearances by The Les Brown Band, The Woody Herman Band, Harry James and his Band, Duke Ellington, Louis Armstrong, Tommy Dorsey, Jimmy Dorsey and the Glenn Miller Band Originally built outside city limits, the park was annexed by the city of Omaha in 1958.

In the 1980s, Omaha's Italian community began holding their annual celebration called La Festa Italiana at the park, and continued until its closure. La Festa is now held at il Palazzo.

=== Segregation policies ===
The park was strictly segregated until 1963. Earlier, in 1955, the State of Nebraska took Peony Park to district court over its segregated swimming policy. In State of Nebraska v. Peony Park, the court found that under Nebraska Civil Rights Law, Peony Park discriminated against African American swimmers at the Amateur Athletic Union Swimming Meet held at the park on August 27, 1955. During that event, two African American participants were barred from the meet because Peony Park barred them from pool. On September 7, 1955, the court fined Peony Park $50 and costs of the trial. Additional civil suits were settled out of court.

Continuing racial tension in Omaha led to youth activists leading protests which brought down the color barrier at the park and added to the civil rights movement in the city. The Omaha Star newspaper made a name for itself during this period, mixing "light news" and entertainment with articles about the incident, segregationist policies around the city and the ongoing trial.

== Amusements ==
Soon after its founding, the private park included a beer garden and ballroom. Little changed after a swimming pool was added in 1926, until the 1970s when the park added its first serious amusement rides, including a roller coaster and other, more standard fare including the "Seven Swings," Wonderland, and the Galaxy roller coaster. Among the rides as of the mid-1980s was a Scrambler that was enclosed within a building, allowing a light show to be incorporated into the ride.

=== Water slides and pool ===
The pool and surrounding beach occupied 4.5 acres (18,000 m^{2}) of the park. Holding approximately five million gallons of filtered, chlorinated water, the seven hundred foot-long pool was supplied by artesian wells. The depth ranged from one foot to 10 feet (3.0 m).

Peony Park was home to three water slides. In 1983 there was an endurance competition in which the winner, a student at the University of Nebraska at Omaha, slid down the four-story water slide at Peony Park 1,710 times in 87 hours and 19 minutes. For winning he won $1,300, a 1950 vintage Coke machine, a moped, waterbed, stereo and other prizes offered by radio station Sweet 98 (KQKQ-FM), sponsor of the event.

=== Royal Terrace Ballroom ===
On the south side of the lake was the Royal Terrace Ballroom, which was billed as "1 acre under one roof." Big name bands from the Swing Era played the ballroom on a regular basis. Columbus bandleader Bobby Mills played a record one year straight each weekend in 1957. Regional rock act The Rumbles reunited at the Royal Terrace in 1979. The ballroom also hosted events with Metallica, Pearl Jam, Red Hot Chili Peppers, The Replacements, Living Colour, Pixies, 311, The Violent Femmes, and The Bangles in its later years.

=== Royal Grove ===
An open-air stage and orchestra shell were covered with a white roof. Called Royal Grove, the area included an open-air dance floor that accommodated three thousand dancers.

From 1978 through 1981, Omaha radio station KOIL hosted an outdoor dance party that was called "Under the Stars" in the Royal Grove, which was broadcast live. It began as "Disco Rondo" (named after the now defunct soft drink) and then changed to "Sprite Night", sponsored by KOIL. Disc jockeys like Christopher Collins, Chris Moreau, Randy Malick, Bill Mattson and Thousands of teens continued to show up each summer year after year, even after KOIL altered its format to become more adult focused. After 1981, the event moved to KQKQ-FM (Sweet 98) and was hosted by teen DJ Hot Scott. Groups as diverse as Fugazi and Unrest also played the outdoor space.

=== Additional structures ===
Originally, there was an open area to the west of Royal Grove with a softball diamond and picnic and recreation grounds. There were also bathhouses, service buildings and refreshment stands throughout.

== Bibliography ==
- Jennings, C.D. (2001) Omaha's Peony Park: An American Legend. Arcadia Publishing.
- Jennings, C.D. (2002) They Call Me Peony: A Park Enthusiasts Stroll Down Memory Lane. BoringBio Productions

== See also ==
- Krug Park (Omaha)
