= Mger Mkrtchyan =

Armenian boxer

Personal information
- Nickname: Matador
- Nationality: Armenian
- Born: Mger Mkrtchyan; 12 November 1976 (age 49) Gyumri, Armenia
- Height: 5 ft 10 in (1.78 m)
- Weight: Super Middleweight

Boxing career
- Stance: Orthodox

Boxing record
- Total fights: 27
- Wins: 24
- Win by KO: 17
- Losses: 3
- Draws: 0
- No contests: 0

Mger Mkrtchyan (born 12 November 1976) is an Armenian former professional boxer from St. Petersburg, Russia. He held the EBU Super Middleweight and the WBO Asia Pacific super middleweight titles. He contended for the 2004 WBO World Super middleweight title but lost to Joe Calzaghe in a 7th-round technical knockout.

He was born in Gyumri, Armenia.

== Professional career ==
Mkrtchyan's professional debut was 29 November 2000. Fifteen fights and 14 wins later, he won the WBO Asia Pacific super middleweight title, his first, against Vage Kocharyan in Saint Petersburg on 19 November 2002.

After wins over Freeman Barr and Jozsef Balazs, Mkrtchyan got the chance to challenge world champion Joe Calzaghe for the 2004 WBO World Super middleweight title. Mkrtchyan lasted 7 rounds before losing in a technical knockout.

On 14 April 2006, Mkrtchyan became the EBU (European) super middleweight champion, knocking out the unbeaten Jackson Chanet. In October, he lost the defense of the title in a split decision to David Gogiya, the former Russian Super Middleweight champion who the WBC ranked ninth in world and the IBF ranked seventh,
