= Maneno Oswald =

Tanzanian boxer (born 1970)

Personal information
- Nickname: Mtambo wa Gongo
- Nationality: (Tanzania) Tanzanian
- Born: Maneno Oswald; February 25, 1970 (age 56) Dar es Salaam, Tanzania
- Height: 5 ft 9 in (1.75 m)
- Weight: Super middleweight

Boxing career
- Stance: Orthodox

Boxing record
- Total fights: 46
- Wins: 28
- Win by KO: 21
- Losses: 17
- Draws: 1
- No contests: 0

Maneno Oswald (born 25 February 1970 in Dar es Salaam) is a Tanzanian super middleweight boxer.
