= Freeman Barr =

Bahamian boxer (born 1973)

Personal information
- Nickname: The Natural
- Nationality: Bahamian
- Born: 12 October 1973 (age 52) Andros, Bahamas
- Height: 5 ft 9 1/2 in (177 cm)
- Weight: Middleweight; Super-middleweight

Boxing career
- Stance: Orthodox

Boxing record
- Total fights: 33
- Wins: 29
- Win by KO: 15
- Losses: 4

Freeman Barr (born October 12, 1973) is a Bahamian former professional boxer who competed from 1993 to 2010, challenging for the WBO middleweight title in 1999.

== Amateur career ==
The youngest of 13 children, Barr had only nine amateur bouts. He was nevertheless a two-time National Amateur Champion in the Bahamas. He represented the Bahamas at the 1990 Commonwealth Games.

== Professional career ==
Barr made his professional debut on February 26, 1993. On January 30, 1999 Barr lost the bout for the WBO middleweight title against Germany's Bert Schenk.

=== Professional Highlights ===
- Florida State Middleweight Champion (Defeated Anthony Brooks on Sept. 28 1996)
- IBC Continental Middleweight Champion (Defeated Andres Arellano Sandoval on Feb. 25 1997)
- IBO Middleweight Champion (Defeated Jerry Brown on Sept. 20 1997)
- WBO-NABO Middleweight Champion (Defeated Lee Fortune on June 2, 1998)
- WBO-NABO Super Middleweight Champion (Defeated Gerald Coleman on Feb. 1 2000)

Achievements
Preceded by Glenwood Brown	IBO Middleweight Champion; 20 Sept 1997 – 1998; Vacates	Succeeded by Mpush Makambi
