= Boxing on ESPN =

Boxing telecasts aired by U.S. cable network ESPN

The cable television network ESPN has occasionally broadcast boxing events over the majority of its history, as part of several arrangements, including contracts with specific promotions and consortiums such as Golden Boy Promotions, Premier Boxing Champions, and Top Rank, as well as Friday Night Fights—a semi-regular series that was broadcast by ESPN and ESPN2 from 1998 through 2015. ESPN stopped covering boxing in 2025, when their broadcast deal with Top Rank ended. In 2026, ESPN returned to boxing by announcing a multi-year deal with Most Valuable Promotions to broadcast their women's boxing platform MVPW.

== Top Rank Boxing ==
From 1980 to 1996, ESPN broadcast fights from the promoter Top Rank through a weekly series known as Top Rank Boxing; it was an early staple of ESPN's programming in the 1980s. Top Rank and ESPN later broke away from the partnership; Top Rank shifted its focus on targeting Spanish-language audiences in the U.S., while ESPN succeeded the broadcasts with a new series, Friday Night Fights, which would feature bouts from other promoters. In 2009, ESPN and Top Rank began discussing a renewed deal; co-founder Bob Arum expressed dissatisfaction at the promotion's previous package for Versus, which featured a large number of low-quality bouts. Arum explained that he would be more likely to deal with ESPN for individual fights rather than a long-term contract, explaining that "I ain't coming to them saying, 'Will you buy this fight or that fight.' We're past that. Give me a couple of dates and let us program them. You like them? Fine, give us a couple of more."

On June 17, 2017, The Ring reported that Top Rank was nearing a two-year deal to air a package of fights on ESPN, citing growing dissatisfaction with cuts to HBO's boxing coverage that limited scheduling options for fights. As a result, Top Rank declined to give HBO the rights to the then-upcoming Manny Pacquiao vs. Jeff Horn. The partnership was also said to include access to ESPN's archives for a planned Top Rank over-the-top service. On June 19, 2017, ESPN announced that it had acquired rights to broadcast Pacquiao vs. Horn, marking Pacquiao's first fight on a non-premium channel, and his first non-pay per view fight since 2005. After a negotiation window with HBO expired, ESPN officially announced that it would broadcast two more Top Rank cards in August, including Vasyl Lomachenko vs. Miguel Marriaga, and Terence Crawford vs. Julius Indongo.

On August 26, 2017, ESPN formally announced that it had reached a four-year deal to become the exclusive broadcaster of Top Rank bouts in the United States and Canada. The fights will be distributed through ESPN's television and digital platforms (including Spanish-language ESPN Deportes, replacing Top Rank's program for UniMás, and Canadian rights for ESPN's local partner TSN), the ESPN+ subscription streaming service, and pay-per-view. ESPN broadcast 18 cards in the first year of the deal. On August 2, 2018, ESPN announced an extension of the agreement through 2025.

The deal would also call for Top Rank to acquire American rights to 24 international cards per-year for broadcast on ESPN+; in September 2018, ESPN and Top Rank acquired rights to cards in the United Kingdom from British promoter Frank Warren—a friend of Arum. In February 2019, Top Rank entered into a co-promotion agreement with Warren's Queensberry Promotions centered upon Tyson Fury, under which ESPN would hold the American media rights to his bouts, and at least two per-year would occur in the United States. The deal was stated to have potential complications on prospects for a rematch against Deontay Wilder (whose last fight ended in a split draw), as Wilder is associated with Premier Boxing Champions (whose rightsholders include Fox Sports, and Showtime—who produced the PPV for Wilder and Fury's initial fight).

In April 2019, ESPN broadcast its first Top Rank PPV, featuring Terence Crawford against Amir Khan for the WBO Welterweight title.

In December 2019, it was announced that a Wilder/Fury re-match had been scheduled for February 2020, and that the PPV would be a joint presentation of ESPN and Fox Sports. The broadcast was largely produced by ESPN staff, with Fox Sports personalities joining those of ESPN. ESPN ended its coverage of Top Rank in 2025 when their deal concluded.

== Friday Night Fights ==
Boxing on ESPN
- Also known as: ESPN Friday Night Fights; ESPN Championship Boxing (1996–1998)
- Presented by: Bernard Hopkins
- Starring: Various personalities
- Narrated by: Joe Tessitore, Teddy Atlas
- Country of origin: United States
- Original language: English (occasional interpreters)

Production
- Camera setup: Multi-camera
- Running time: Various

Original release
- Network: ESPN2
- Release: October 2, 1998 – May 22, 2015

Related
- Friday Night Lights Out (Spike); MetroPCS Friday Night Knockout (truTV)

In 1998, ESPN premiered Friday Night Fights; the series traditionally featured bouts involving both up-and-coming and seasoned professional boxers, along with studio segments covering headlines and developments across the sport. As implied by its title, the program was primarily broadcast on Friday nights, semi-regularly.

Ringside commentary was provided by Joe Tessitore and Teddy Atlas; previous seasons featured boxing analyst Max Kellerman alongside Brian Kenny and sportscaster Bob Papa in Tessitore's role ringside with Atlas. The program spawned spin-offs, Tuesday Night Fights and Wednesday Night Fights. A Spanish-language version, Noche de Combates, aired on ESPN Deportes and ESPN Latin America.

=== Notable appearances ===
- Emanuel Augustus (July 8, 2005)
- Andre Berto
- Jesse Brinkley
- O'Neil Bell
- Cornelius K9 Bundrage
- James Butler (November 23, 2001)
- Derek Bryant
- Nate Campbell
- Aaron Davis
- Julio Díaz
- John Duddy
- Antwun Echols (February 29, 2008)
- Arturo Gatti
- Julio César González
- Yuriorkis Gamboa
- Allan Green
- Vivian Harris
- Yuri Foreman
- Audley Harrison
- Stevie Johnston
- Zab Judah (July 9, 1999)
- James Kirkland
- Julian Letterlough
- Yusaf Mack (February 6, 2009 vs. Chris Henry, and May 2, 2010 vs. Glen Johnson)
- Antonio Margarito
- Oleg Maskaev
- José Luis Castillo
- Peter Manfredo Jr.
- Edison Miranda
- Sergio Mora
- Kassim Ouma
- Bobby Pacquiao
- Sam Peter (April 28, 2006)
- Hasim Rahman
- Cletus Seldin (February 28, 2015)
- Omar Sheika
- Cory Spinks
- John Thompson, fought on series finale
- Arash Usmanee (January 4, 2013)
- Micky Ward (July 16, 1999)
- Erislandy Lara
- Guillermo Rigondeaux
- Jean Pascal
- Brian Vera
- Bonecrusher Smith (2006)

Boxers who have fought on Tuesday Night Fights:

- Emanuel Augustus (July 6, 2004)
- Ian Gardner (July 5, 2005)

Boxers who have fought on Wednesday Night Fights:

- Allan Green (April 26, 2006)
- Yusaf Mack (6/4/2008 vs. Daniel Judah)
- Jameel McCline (April 26, 2006)
- Sharmba Mitchell (May 3, 2006)
- Joey Spina (May 10, 2006)

== Premier Boxing Champions ==
On March 19, 2015, ESPN announced that Friday Night Fights would air for the final time on May 22, 2015, covering the finals of the 2015 Boxcino tournament. The network announced that it had reached a multi-year deal with Al Haymon's Premier Boxing Champions to broadcast 11 events per-year on the main ESPN network, primarily on Saturday nights, and an afternoon event on ABC. Joe Tessitore and Teddy Atlas will carry over to serve as hosts. ESPN is one of several major broadcasters that airs fights through the promotion, which also includes NBC, CBS, their respective cable sports networks, as well as Spike. ESPN aired its last PBC fight in mid 2016.

== Golden Boy ==
On January 19, 2017, ESPN announced an agreement with Golden Boy Promotions to broadcast Golden Boy Boxing on ESPN. Under a two-year deal, ESPN and ESPN Deportes broadcast 42 Golden Boy-promoted cards, with 18 airing in 2017 and 24 airing in 2018. The contract included an option for a third year.

== Most Valuable Promotions ==
In 2026, ESPN announced a partnership with Jake Paul's boxing promotion, Most Valuable Promotions to broadcast their women's boxing brand MVPW. A multi-year deal that will broadcast MVPW events on ESPN through 2028.
