= Jeff Lacy =

American boxer

Personal information
- Nickname: Left Hook
- Born: Jeffrey Scott Lacy; May 12, 1977 (age 49) St. Petersburg, Florida, U.S.
- Height: 5 ft 10 1/2 in (179 cm)
- Weight: Super middleweight; Light heavyweight

Boxing career
- Reach: 74 in (188 cm)
- Stance: Orthodox

Boxing record
- Total fights: 34
- Wins: 27
- Win by KO: 18
- Losses: 6
- No contests: 1

Jeffrey Scott Lacy (born May 12, 1977) is an American former professional boxer who competed from 2001 to 2015. He held the IBF super middleweight title from 2004 to 2006, and the IBO super middleweight title from 2005 to 2006. Lacy rose to prominence in the early to mid-2000s as a feared puncher in the division, with his physique and knockout record making him one of boxing's top-rated prospects at the time.

== Amateur career ==
Lacy had over two hundred fights as an amateur, winning the 1999 National PAL amateur champion at 165 pounds, the 1998 U.S. National amateur champion at 165 pounds, and the 1998 National PAL amateur champion at 165 pounds. Lacy fought at the 1996 Eastern Olympic Trials, stopping Kenneth Head in the first round. In the quarter-finals, Lacy defeated Rubin Williams. In the semi-finals, Lacy lost to Darnell Wilson and finished third.

In the 1997 National Golden Gloves, Lacy again defeated Rubin Williams, but lost against Randy Griffin in the semi-finals and finished in third place. In the quarter-finals of the 2000 Olympic Team trials, Lacy won a decision over Brad Austin. In the semi-finals, Lacy won a decision over Jerson Ravelo. During the finals, Lacy won a 26–10 decision over Randy Griffin.

During the 2000 Olympic Team Box-offs, Lacy lost to Arthur Palac. In his second fight, Lacy defeated him on the scorecards. He was a member of the 2000 United States Olympic boxing team along with future undisputed middleweight champion Jermain Taylor. During his first bout in Sydney, Australia, Lacy knocked out Cleiton Conceição of Brazil at 0:58 of the third round. During his second bout, Lacy defeated Pawel Kakietek of Poland, en route to a 21-7 decision. During the third bout, Lacy was stopped at 1:49 of the third round by Gaidarbek Gaidarbekov of Russia.

Lacy completed an amateur record of 209 wins, 12 losses.

== Professional career ==
=== Rise to stardom ===
Lacy made his professional debut against Jerald Lowe on February 2, 2001, knocking him out in the first round. He won his next eight fights by way of knockout and won the WBC Continental Americas super middleweight title against Anwar Oshana, by way of technical knockout in round two.

On July 15, 2003, he won the USBA and NABA super middleweight titles after beating Richard Grant by unanimous decision. He defended all three of his belts against Donnell Wiggins by TKO 8. He later fought Syd Vanderpool for the vacant IBF super middleweight title on October 2, 2004, winning by TKO in 8 rounds. He defended it against Omar Sheika, Rubin Williams, former champion Robin Reid, and Scott Pemberton.

=== Loss to Joe Calzaghe ===
On March 4, 2006, at the MEN Arena in Manchester, England, Lacy lost his title to Joe Calzaghe. Despite being a favorite going into the fight, Lacy lost by a unanimous points decision and was knocked down in the twelfth round. Lacy, who had promised a knockout victory pre fight, was the betting favorite largely due to his age and the nature of his recent title defenses. He started the fight very aggressively but was immediately troubled by Calzaghe's work-rate and handspeed. Lacy was hit with a plethora of hurtful punches as Calzaghe managed to consistently land a staggeringly high volume of shots. Lacy continued to try and feint his way in quickly to land his famous left hook but Calzaghe was able to evade or ride the shot. As the match wore on Lacy became increasingly disheartened, and his face a bloody mess. The fight became more and more punishing throughout the middle, and into the later rounds with many expecting the referee to halt the action and save Lacy from such a horrendous beating. To the criticism of onlookers, Lacy's corner continued with the fight in the belief that he could still turn the fight around with one punch. In the end the result was extremely one sided with final scores of 119-105, 119-107 and 119-107. A point deducted from Calzaghe in the 11th round was all that prevented Lacy from losing every round on every card. Many observers have been vocal in their belief that the nature of the loss to Calzaghe meant that Lacy was from then on a shell of his former self.

=== After Calzaghe ===
Lacy fought a rematch with Vitali Tsypko on December 2, 2006, in Tampa, Florida, on the same card as Winky Wright's fight against Ike Quartey. This was the second time he had fought Tsypko, the first fight in 2004 which ended in a majority decision. Lacy won the fight by scores of 96-94, 96-94, 95-95. After the bout, it was revealed that Lacy had torn his rotator cuff and was injured throughout most of the fight. Lacy had surgery on the injury and did not fight for a year after the bout.

Lacy returned on December 8, 2007, to defeat Peter Manfredo Jr. by a unanimous decision. On July 23, 2008, beat Epifanio Mendoza by a majority decision. Lacy then fought former world middleweight champion Jermain Taylor on November 15, 2008, and lost the fight by unanimous decision, making it only the second loss of his career.

On April 10, 2009, Jeff Lacy defeated Otis Griffin by a majority decision with the scores of 97-93, 96-94, 95-95.

=== Loss to Roy Jones Jr. and beyond ===
On August 15, 2009, Lacy suffered a 10th-round technical knockout to Roy Jones Jr.

Sixteen months after the loss to Jones Jr., Lacy returned to his hometown of St. Petersburg, Florida to face journeyman Dhafir Smith. Smith defeated Lacy by a unanimous decision.

After almost three years after the loss to Smith, Lacy returned on November 30, 2013 to win a 3rd-round TKO over Martin Verdin in Baton Rouge, Louisiana.

Jeff Lacy was knocked out on July 10, 2014 by Umberto Savigne.

Jeff Lacy lost by TKO in the 4th round on January 30, 2015 to undefeated contender Sullivan Barrera.

== Personal life ==
Lacy played the role of Malice Blake in the 2007 boxing movie, "The Hammer", starring and produced by Adam Carolla.

Jeff Lacy, son of professional heavyweight Hydra Lacy, Sr., is the older brother of professional heavyweight boxer Kenny Lacy and middleweight boxer Marshawn Lacy and the younger brother of Hydra Lacy, Jr, a career criminal who was shot by the police during a shootout in a St. Petersburg, Florida house, during which two police officers were killed by Hydra.

In 2018, Lacy sued RaceTrac for trademark infringement for their Left Hook Energy drink.

== Professional boxing record ==
34 fights	27 wins	6 losses
By knockout	18	3
By decision	9	3
No contests	1	

No.	Result	Record	Opponent	Type	Round, time	Date	Location	Notes
34	Loss	27–6 (1)	Sullivan Barrera	TKO	4 (8), 2:05	Jan 30, 2015	Foxwoods Resort Casino, Ledyard, Connecticut, U.S.	
33	Win	27–5 (1)	Timothy Hall Jr.	UD	8	Dec 11, 2014	TradeWinds Island Grand Resort, St. Petersburg, Florida, U.S.	
32	Loss	26–5 (1)	Umberto Savigne	TKO	2 (10), 2:04	Jul 10, 2014	American Airlines Arena, Miami, Florida, U.S.	For vacant WBC Latino light heavyweight title
31	Win	26–4 (1)	Martin Verdin	TKO	3 (10), 1:19	Nov 30, 2013	Belle Casino, Baton Rouge, Louisiana, U.S.	
30	Loss	25–4 (1)	Dhafir Smith	UD	12	Dec 11, 2010	Jannus Landing, St. Petersburg, Florida, U.S.	For vacant UBO International super middleweight title
29	Loss	25–3 (1)	Roy Jones Jr.	RTD	10 (12), 3:00	Aug 15, 2009	Coast Coliseum, Biloxi, Mississippi, U.S.	For WBO–NABO light heavyweight title
28	Win	25–2 (1)	Otis Griffin	MD	10	Apr 10, 2009	USF Sun Dome, Tampa, Florida, U.S.	
27	Loss	24–2 (1)	Jermain Taylor	UD	12	Nov 15, 2008	Memorial Gymnasium, Nashville, Tennessee, U.S.	
26	Win	24–1 (1)	Epifanio Mendoza	MD	10	Jul 23, 2008	Morongo Casino Resort & Spa, Cabazon, California, U.S.	
25	Win	23–1 (1)	Peter Manfredo Jr.	UD	10	Dec 8, 2007	MGM Grand Garden Arena, Paradise, Nevada, U.S.	
24	Win	22–1 (1)	Vitali Tsypko	MD	10	Dec 2, 2006	St. Pete Times Forum, Tampa, Florida, U.S.	
23	Loss	21–1 (1)	Joe Calzaghe	UD	12	Mar 4, 2006	MEN Arena, Manchester, England	Lost IBF super middleweight title; For WBO and inaugural The Ring super middleweight titles
22	Win	21–0 (1)	Scott Pemberton	KO	2 (12), 2:59	Nov 5, 2005	Caesars Tahoe, Stateline, Nevada, U.S.	Retained IBF and IBO super middleweight titles
21	Win	20–0 (1)	Robin Reid	RTD	7 (12), 2:54	Aug 6, 2005	St. Pete Times Forum, Tampa, Florida, U.S.	Retained IBF super middleweight title; Won IBO super middleweight title
20	Win	19–0 (1)	Rubin Williams	TKO	7 (12), 0:47	Mar 5, 2005	Mandalay Bay Events Center, Paradise, Nevada, U.S.	Retained IBF super middleweight title
19	Win	18–0 (1)	Omar Sheika	UD	12	Dec 4, 2004	Mandalay Bay Events Center, Paradise, Nevada, U.S.	Retained IBF super middleweight title
18	Win	17–0 (1)	Syd Vanderpool	TKO	8 (12), 1:37	Oct 2, 2004	Caesars Palace, Paradise, Nevada, U.S.	Won vacant IBF super middleweight title
17	NC	16–0 (1)	Vitali Tsypko	NC	2 (12)	Jun 5, 2004	Leggett & Platt Athletic Center, Joplin, Missouri, U.S.	Tsypko unable to continue after a cut from an accidental head clash
16	Win	16–0	Donnell Wiggins	TKO	8 (12), 2:33	Dec 13, 2003	MEN Arena, Manchester, England	Retained WBC Continental Americas, WBA–NABA, and IBF–USBA super middleweight titles
15	Win	15–0	Richard Grant	UD	12	Jul 15, 2003	Playboy Mansion, Beverly Hills, California, U.S.	Retained WBC Continental Americas and IBF–USBA super middleweight titles; Won vacant WBA–NABA super middleweight title
14	Win	14–0	Anwar Oshana	TKO	2 (12), 1:49	May 17, 2003	City Center Pavilion, Reno, Nevada, U.S.	Retained WBC Continental Americas super middleweight title
13	Win	13–0	James Crawford	TKO	2 (12), 2:57	Feb 22, 2003	The Pyramid, Memphis, Tennessee, U.S.	Retained WBC Continental Americas super middleweight title; Won vacant IBF–USBA super middleweight title
12	Win	12–0	Ross Thompson	UD	12	Nov 9, 2002	Coca-Cola Event Center, Oklahoma City, Oklahoma, U.S.	Won WBC Continental Americas super middleweight title
11	Win	11–0	Jason Collins	KO	1 (8), 2:25	Aug 17, 2002	Cardiff Castle, Cardiff, Wales	
10	Win	10–0	Kevin Hall	RTD	3 (8), 3:00	Jun 8, 2002	The Pyramid, Memphis, Tennessee, U.S.	
9	Win	9–0	Bobby Jones	UD	10	Mar 30, 2002	Lucky Star Casino, Concho, Oklahoma, U.S.	
8	Win	8–0	Glenn Thomas	KO	1 (10), 0:55)	Feb 16, 2002	Mohegan Sun Arena, Montville, Connecticut, U.S.	
7	Win	7–0	Fike Wilson	TKO	1 (6), 0:50	Jan 12, 2002	Cox Pavilion, Paradise, Nevada, U.S.	
6	Win	6–0	Bawa Adime	TKO	3 (8), 2:16	Oct 13, 2001	Tropicana Casino & Resort, Atlantic City, New Jersey, U.S.	
5	Win	5–0	Tyler Hughes	RTD	3 (6), 3:00	Sep 1, 2001	Mandalay Bay Events Center, Paradise, Nevada, U.S.	
4	Win	4–0	Anthony Greeley	TKO	1 (6), 2:15	Sep 1, 2001	Don Haskins Center, El Paso, Texas, U.S.	
3	Win	3–0	Tony Pope	TKO	1 (6), 2:27	May 19, 2001	Mohegan Sun Arena, Montville, Connecticut, U.S.	
2	Win	2–0	Tommy Attardo	KO	1 (4), 1:41	Mar 2, 2001	Texas Station, North Las Vegas, Nevada, U.S.	
1	Win	1–0	Jerald Lowe	KO	1 (4), 2:00	Feb 2, 2001	Celeste Center, Columbus, Ohio, U.S.	

Sporting positions
Amateur boxing titles
Previous: Jorge Hawley	U.S. middleweight champion 1998	Next: Arthur Palac
Regional boxing titles
Preceded by Ross Thompson	WBC Continental Americas super middleweight champion November 9, 2002 – June 2004; Vacated	Vacant Title next held by Éric Lucas
Vacant Title last held by Thomas Tate	USBA super middleweight champion February 22, 2003 – October 2, 2004; Won IBF title	Vacant Title next held by Yusaf Mack
Vacant Title last held by Antwun Echols	WBA–NABA super middleweight champion July 15, 2003 – March 2004; Vacated	Vacant Title next held by Librado Andrade
Minor world boxing titles
Preceded by Robin Reid	IBO super middleweight champion August 6, 2005 – March 5, 2006; Vacated	Vacant Title next held by Fulgencio Zúñiga
Major world boxing titles
Vacant Title last held by Sven Ottke	IBF super middleweight champion October 2, 2004 – March 4, 2006	Succeeded by Joe Calzaghe
