= Joe Calzaghe vs. Jeff Lacy =

Boxing match

Judgement Day
- Date: 4 March 2006
- Venue: Manchester Arena, Manchester, UK
- Title(s) on the line: IBF, WBO and inaugural The Ring super middleweight titles

Tale of the tape
Boxer	(United Kingdom) Joe Calzaghe	(United States) Jeff Lacy
Nickname	"Pride of Wales"	"Left Hook"
Hometown	Newbridge, Caerphilly, Wales, UK	St. Petersburg, Florida, U.S.
Pre-fight record	40–0 (31 KO)	21–0 (1) (17 KO)
Age	33 years, 11 months	28 years, 9 months
Height	6 ft 0 in (183 cm)	5 ft 10 1/2 in (179 cm)
Weight	168 lb (76 kg)	167 lb (76 kg)
Style	Southpaw	Orthodox
Recognition	WBO; Super Middleweight Champion; The Ring; No. 1 Ranked Super Middleweight	IBF; Super Middleweight Champion; The Ring; No. 3 Ranked Super Middleweight

Result
- Calzaghe defeated Lacy via Unanimous decision

Joe Calzaghe vs. Jeff Lacy, billed as Judgement Day, was a professional boxing match contested on 4 March 2006, for the IBF, WBO and The Ring championship. It pitted long-time WBO champion Calzaghe against up and coming IBF champion, American Jeff "Left Hook" Lacy.

== Background ==
Joe Calzaghe had been WBO super middleweight champion for over eight years having beaten Chris Eubank for the vacant title in 1997. He had held onto his belt for 17 defences and was considered on the fringes of being one of the best fighters of the world.

Jeff Lacy was an American champion who had been compared to Mike Tyson in size and was considered one of the hottest prospects in American boxing. In 2004 he won the IBF title against Syd Vanderpool by TKO in the eighth round. Most American journalists wrote off Calzaghe's chances of victory and the odds were against Calzaghe despite having an equally perfect record, and even people in the UK doubted him. Prior to the fight, Calzaghe was worried about his left hand after breaking it against Evans Ashira. He contemplated pulling out of the fight only for his father Enzo and Frank Warren to persuade him to take a potentially life-changing fight. The fight was staged at 2.00am local time at the MEN Arena in Manchester and topped the bill on Frank Warren's Sport Network and was live on ITV in the UK and Showtime in the United States. The Ring announcer was Jimmy Lennon, Jr. and the referee was Raul Caiz.

== The fight ==
The fight was a messy affair early on with both trading punches at close range with Lacy getting through on occasion. However after 4 rounds, Calzaghe dominated with his superior hand speed and all-round boxing ability. It became a one-sided beating of Lacy that involved him being rocked on several occasions and being knocked down for the first time in his career in the 12th round. In round one, Lacy had a bloody nose. By round four he was cut, but still came forward and occasionally landing. By round 12 his eyes were puffed up at the end of the fight, looked spent. Lacy failed to land many of his trademark left hooks and the only thing that prevented Calzaghe from a shutout was a deducted point for punching round Lacy's back at the break in the 11th. The number of blows was 351/948 for Calzaghe and 116/444 for Lacy. The three ringside judges scored the bout 119-105, 119-107 and 119-107, all for Calzaghe. The decisive victory for Calzaghe cemented his position at the top of the super middleweight ranks.

== Aftermath ==
Jeff Lacy was never the same fighter again. He won his next 3 fights, but then lost again to Jermain Taylor. Calzaghe, however, was propelled into the limelight, going on to have a successful career and be recognised in the pound-for-pound lists before retiring unbeaten. Calzaghe said: "Eight years I've been champion and I've been written off by a lot of people. This fight has been on my mind morning, noon and night. I demolished him and outclassed him. His punches didn't trouble me in the slightest. I was expecting more. I saw them coming from miles away. I knew I was going to win the fight. How's that for a slapper? Those slaps had his legs going all over the place."

Boxing legend Sugar Ray Leonard, who admitted to knowing little of Calzaghe before the fight, said: "Within two rounds I was a Calzaghe supporter. I stood up in front of the TV shouting, 'Wow, look at this guy!'

== Undercard ==
Confirmed bouts:

== Broadcasting ==
Country	Broadcaster
United Kingdom	ITV
United States	Showtime

Preceded by vs. Evans Ashira	Joe Calzaghe's bouts 4 March 2006	Succeeded by vs. Sakio Bika
Preceded by vs. Scott Pemberton	Jeff Lacy's bouts 4 March 2006	Succeeded by vs. Vitali Tsypko II
