= Librado Andrade =

Mexican boxer (born 1978)

Personal information
- Born: Librado Andrade Ornelas; September 2, 1978 (age 48) Jesus del Monte, Guanajuato, Mexico
- Height: 6 ft (183 cm) 2
- Weight: Super middleweight

Boxing career
- Reach: 78 in (198 cm)
- Stance: Orthodox

Boxing record
- Total fights: 36
- Wins: 31
- Win by KO: 24
- Losses: 5

Librado Andrade Ornelas (born September 2, 1978) is a Mexican former professional boxer who competed from 1999 to 2013, and challenged three times for a super middleweight world title between 2007 and 2009. His brother Enrique Ornelas is also a professional boxer.

== Professional career ==
Though ranked in the top twenty-five in the division for the last couple of years, Andrade has faced little real opposition leading up to his bout against WBA/WBC champion Mikkel Kessler. Prior to the Kessler fight, he was best known for his first round knockout of former contender Richard Grant and defeating former middleweight champion Otis Grant. He also gained some recognition for being asked to be Bernard Hopkins sparring partner in preparation for Hopkins' rematch with Jermain Taylor. Andrade declined this request at the behest of his manager Al Haymon, who told Andrade: "You can't have the mentality of being a helper for another fighter. You have to have the mentality of a champion.". In 2005, Kessler himself had used Andrade for a three-round sparring session while training in Los Angeles for a fight with Anthony Mundine.

In the Kessler fight, Andrade showed an incredible ability to endure an all-out assault. Kessler landed 348 punches, almost all to the head of Andrade. Throughout the punishment, Andrade showed no facial, or mental wear and tear and continued to press the fight each round by coming forward, at Kessler. Prior to the last round, the two fighters, in a rare display of respect in boxing, embraced each other rather than simply touching gloves. The judges at ringside, Tom Kaczmarek, Tom Miller and John Keane, all had the bout score 120-108 in favor of Mikkel Kessler. The fight was aired live on HBO's Boxing After Dark.

On October 6, 2007 on a Marco Antonio Barrera vs Manny Pacquiao II main event undercard fight, Andrade won the vacant USBA 168-pound title with a 7th-round TKO of Yusaf Mack.

On March 22, 2008, Andrade scored the biggest victory of his career against former IBF number one contender Robert Stieglitz of Germany. Andrade dominated the fight from the opening round with uppercuts and body shots that left Stieglitz continually on the defensive. Landing a solid right in the eighth round, Stieglitz was left staggered. Andrade followed up with flurry of shots that led to referee stop the fight, giving Andrade a TKO victory. As this was an eliminator bout, Andrade has been lined up for a fight with IBF Super Middleweight champion Lucian Bute.

=== Andrade vs. Bute ===
The IBF championship fight on October 24, 2008 saw Bute dominate nearly every round. Andrade demonstrated his endurance but could not break Bute's strategy. However, in the 12th round, Andrade landed several effective combinations that rendered Bute groggy and exhausted. Bute nearly hit the canvas a couple of times on his own and finally got knocked down by a strong right hand with two seconds left. Controversy ensued as the referee Marlon B. Wright interrupted the count to warn Andrade, because according to his interpretation, Andrade did not remain in a neutral corner. After the fight, the referee declared that in his opinion, Bute would not have beaten the count had Andrade not moved out of his neutral corner to gain an unfair advantage. Andrade said: “He ( Bute ) was clearly out. It was outrageous! If this is the way to lose a fight, then this is the way I want to lose. I know I won the fight because I came with the intent to knock him out and I did.”

In Quebec City on ESPN's Friday Night Fights, Librado beat Eric Lucas. The fight was stopped due to cuts over Eric's left eye, Andrade was leading on all three scorecards.

== Professional boxing record ==
36 fights	31 wins	5 losses
By knockout	24	2
By decision	7	3

No.	Result	Record	Opponent	Type	Round, time	Date	Location	Notes
36	Win	31–5	(Mexico) Jesus Ortega	TKO	2 (8), 1:16	Jun 15, 2013	Park Nave 1, Villahermosa, Mexico	
35	Loss	30–5	(United States) Rowland Bryant	TKO	3 (10), 2:19	Apr 21, 2012	(United States) Don Haskins Center, El Paso, Texas, U.S.	
34	Win	30–4	(Canada) Matt O'Brien	TKO	3 (12), 2:20	Aug 27, 2011	Centro de Espectáculos, León, Mexico	Won vacant WBC Continental Americas super middleweight title
33	Loss	29–4	(United States) Aaron Pryor Jr.	MD	10	May 6, 2011	(United States) Fantasy Springs Resort Casino, Indio, California, U.S.	
32	Win	29–3	(Canada) Éric Lucas	RTD	8 (10), 3:00	May 28, 2010	Colisée Pepsi, Quebec City, Quebec, Canada	
31	Loss	28–3	(Romania) Lucian Bute	KO	4 (12), 2:57	Nov 28, 2009	Colisée Pepsi, Quebec City, Quebec, Canada	For IBF super middleweight title
30	Win	28–2	(Ukraine) Vitali Tsypko	UD	12	Apr 4, 2009	Bell Centre, Montreal, Quebec, Canada	
29	Loss	27–2	(Romania) Lucian Bute	UD	12	Oct 24, 2008	Bell Centre, Montreal, Quebec, Canada	For IBF super middleweight title
28	Win	27–1	(Germany) Robert Stieglitz	TKO	8 (12), 1:53	Mar 22, 2008	(United States) Morongo Casino Resort & Spa, Cabazon, California, U.S.	
27	Win	26–1	(United States) Yusaf Mack	TKO	7 (12), 2:34	Oct 6, 2007	(United States) Mandalay Bay Events Center, Paradise, Nevada, U.S.	Won vacant USBA super middleweight title
26	Win	25–1	(United States) Ted Muller	TKO	2 (8), 1:48	Jul 21, 2007	(United States) Mandalay Bay Events Center, Paradise, Nevada, U.S.	
25	Loss	24–1	(Denmark) Mikkel Kessler	UD	12	Mar 24, 2007	Parken Stadium, Copenhagen, Denmark	For WBA (Super) and WBC super middleweight titles
24	Win	24–0	(Jamaica) Richard Grant	KO	1 (10), 2:49	Sep 15, 2006	(United States) Aragon Ballroom, Chicago, Illinois, U.S.	
23	Win	23–0	(Jamaica) Otis Grant	RTD	7 (12), 3:00	Apr 8, 2006	Montreal Casino, Montreal, Quebec, Canada	
22	Win	22–0	(Colombia) Nicolas Cervera	TKO	3 (10), 1:09	Feb 4, 2005	(United States) UNF Arena, Jacksonville, Florida, U.S.	
21	Win	21–0	(United States) Thomas Reid	TKO	4 (10), 1:52	Dec 16, 2004	(United States) Grand Olympic Auditorium, Los Angeles, California, U.S.	Won vacant WBC Latino super middleweight title
20	Win	20–0	(Ukraine) Vitali Kopitko	TKO	2 (10), 0:27	Sep 30, 2004	(United States) Grand Olympic Auditorium, Los Angeles, California, U.S.	
19	Win	19–0	(Panama) Tito Mendoza	UD	12	Jun 24, 2004	(United States) Bren Events Center, Irvine, California, U.S.	Won vacant WBO–NABO super middleweight title
18	Win	18–0	(United States) Willie Stewart	UD	12	Mar 19, 2004	(United States) Exposition Center, Louisville, Kentucky, U.S.	Won vacant WBA–NABA super middleweight title
17	Win	17–0	(United States) Leonard Townsend	TKO	2 (10), 3:00	Nov 6, 2003	(United States) HP Pavilion, San Jose, California, U.S.	
16	Win	16–0	(Mexico) Eduardo Ayala	TKO	7 (10)	Jul 10, 2003	(United States) Allstate Arena, Chicago, Illinois, U.S.	
15	Win	15–0	(Belize) Errol Banner	KO	2 (6), 0:32	Apr 17, 2003	(United States) Grand Olympic Auditorium, Los Angeles, California, U.S.	
14	Win	14–0	(Mexico) Juan Carlos Barreto	TKO	1 (6), 2:40	Feb 28, 2003	(United States) Selland Arena, Fresno, California, U.S.	
13	Win	13–0	(United States) Shannon Miller	TKO	2 (6), 2:29	Sep 28, 2002	(United States) Arrowhead Pond, Anaheim, California, U.S.	
12	Win	12–0	(United States) Pat Lawlor	TKO	2 (6), 3:00	Jun 24, 2002	(United States) DoubleTree, Ontario, California, U.S.	
11	Win	11–0	(United States) Ruben Perez	UD	6	Sep 27, 2001	(United States) Arrowhead Pond, Anaheim, California, U.S.	
10	Win	10–0	(United States) Jimmy Hagar	UD	6	Jun 19, 2001	(United States) Fairgrounds, Del Mar, California, U.S.	
9	Win	9–0	(United States) Harold Lowe	KO	2 (4), 1:45	May 24, 2001	(United States) Arrowhead Pond, Anaheim, California, U.S.	
8	Win	8–0	(Suriname) Eric Benito Tzand	KO	3 (6), 0:45	Mar 29, 2001	(United States) Arrowhead Pond, Anaheim, California, U.S.	
7	Win	7–0	(United States) Sheridan Page	KO	1 (4), 2:06	Jan 18, 2001	(United States) Arrowhead Pond, Anaheim, California, U.S.	
6	Win	6–0	(United States) Marcus Harvey	UD	4	Aug 17, 2000	(United States) Arrowhead Pond, Anaheim, California, U.S.	
5	Win	5–0	(United States) Bernard Temple	TKO	4 (4), 2:59	May 18, 2000	(United States) Marriott Hotel, Irvine, California, U.S.	
4	Win	4–0	(United States) Terry Smith	KO	2 (4)	Apr 13, 2000	(United States) Arrowhead Pond, Anaheim, California, U.S.	
3	Win	3–0	(United States) Paul Jones	KO	4 (4)	Feb 3, 2000	(United States) Marriott Hotel, Irvine, California, U.S.	
2	Win	2–0	(United States) George Johnson	KO	1 (4)	Dec 2, 1999	(United States) Marriott Hotel, Irvine, California, U.S.	
1	Win	1–0	(United States) Marcus Harvey	UD	4	Aug 14, 1999	(United States) Los Alamitos Race Course, Cypress, California, U.S.	

== Personal ==
Andrade was born in Guanajuato, Mexico. His family emigrated to La Habra, California when he was ten years old. Andrade was previously married and has two children.

During an HBO telecast of his fight against Yusaf Mack, it was reported that Andrade lost 14 of his 16 amateur bouts. At one point, Andrade worked the morning shifts at a Jack in the Box fast food restaurant while training at the gym in the afternoon.

Sporting positions
Regional boxing titles
Vacant Title last held by Jeff Lacy	WBA–NABA super middleweight champion March 19, 2004 – June 2004; Vacated	Vacant Title next held by Lucian Bute
Vacant Title last held by Kabary Salem	WBO–NABO super middleweight champion June 24, 2004 – December 2004; Vacated	Vacant Title next held by Chad Dawson
Vacant Title last held by Tito Mendoza	WBC Latino super middleweight champion December 16, 2004 – September 2006; Vacated	Vacant Title next held by Jean Pascal
Vacant Title last held by Yusaf Mack	USBA super middleweight champion October 6, 2007 – October 24, 2008; Lost bid for IBF title	Vacant Title next held by Don George
Vacant Title last held by Alfonso López III	WBC Continental Americas super middleweight champion August 27, 2011 – April 2012; Vacated	Vacant Title next held by Julio César Chávez Jr.
