= Elvir Muriqi =

Albanian boxer

Personal information
- Nickname: The Kosovo Kid
- Nationality: (Albania) Albanian
- Born: Elvir Muriqi; April 29, 1979 (age 47) Peje, Kosovo
- Height: 5 ft 10.5 in (179 cm)

Boxing career
- Stance: Orthodox

Boxing record
- Total fights: 47
- Wins: 40
- Win by KO: 24
- Losses: 7
- No contests: 0

Elvir Muriqi (born April 29, 1979) is an Kosovan former professional boxer.

== Background ==
Muriqi was born in Kosovo, which at the time was part of Yugoslavia. He moved to the United States in 1996 with his family to escape the growing tension in Kosovo. He turned professional in Atlantic City, New Jersey.

== Career ==
Muriqi competed as a pro boxer from 1998 to 2014, finishing with a record of 40 wins and 7 losses (24 KO's). His first professional loss was to journeyman boxer Danny Sheehan in a March 2000 bout that was televised by ESPN2. He rebounded to defeat Sheehan four months later. Danny Sheehan finished his career with 39 losses and was diagnosed with mild cognitive disorder with a strong likelihood of chronic traumatic encephalopathy (CTE) in 2020. Muriqi also lost to Antonio Tarver in an IBO light heavyweight world title bout and Clinton Woods in an IBF light heavyweight world title eliminator match. His best wins are against Daniel Judah and Marlon Hayes. He was trained for part of his career by Teddy Atlas.

== Professional boxing record ==
40 Wins (24 knockouts, 15 decisions), 7 Losses (1 knockout, 5 decisions, 1 disqualification), 0 Draws
Res.	Record	Opponent	Type	Rd., Time	Date	Location	Notes
Loss	40-7	(United States) Sean Monaghan	UD	10	2014-06-14	(United States) Brooklyn, New York	WBC Continental Americas Light Heavyweight Title
Loss	40-6	(Australia) Blake Caparello	UD	10	2014-01-31	(United States) West Orange, New Jersey	
Win	40-5	(United States) Paul Vasquez	MD	8	2013-03-15	(United States) Imperial House, Clinton Township, Michigan	
Win	39-5	(United States) Chris Grays	TKO	2 (8)	2011-12-10	(United States) Imperial House, Clinton Township, Michigan	
Win	38-5	(United States) Daniel Judah	UD	10	2010-11-20	(United States) Aviator Sports Complex, Brooklyn, New York	
Win	37-5	(United States) Tiwon Taylor	TKO	2 (8)	2009-10-10	(United States) Coliseum Complex Events Center, Greensboro, North Carolina	
Win	36-5	(Ukraine) Oleksandr Garashchenko	UD	10	2009-04-18	Pallati i Rinise, Pristina, Kosovo	
Loss	35-5	(United Kingdom) Clinton Woods	UD	12	2009-02-14	(United Kingdom) Hotel de France, Saint Helier, Jersey, Channel Islands	IBF Light Heavyweight Title eliminator
Win	35-4	(United States) Jameel Wilson	TKO	4 (10)	2008-01-31	(United States) Utopia Paradise Theater, Bronx, New York	
Loss	34-4	(United States) Antonio Tarver	MD	12	2007-06-09	(United States) Connecticut Convention Center, Hartford, Connecticut	For vacant IBO Light Heavyweight Title
Win	34-3	(United States) Derrick Reed	TKO	1 (6)	2006-12-08	(United States) Paradise Theater, Bronx, New York	
Win	33-3	(United States) Ted Muller	UD	8	2006-10-11	(United States) Westchester County Center, White Plains, New York	
Win	32-3	(United States) Marlon Hayes	UD	8	2006-07-28	(United States) Monticello Raceway, Monticello, New York	
Loss	31-3	(Ukraine) Oleksandr Garashchenko	SD	6	2005-04-30	(United States) Madison Square Garden, New York City, New York	
Win	31-2	(United States) Caseny Truesdale	TKO	1 (6)	2005-03-05	(United States) The Venue, Greensboro, North Carolina	
Loss	30-2	(United States) Danny Santiago	TKO	4 (10)	2004-10-02	(United States) Madison Square Garden, New York City, New York	
Win	30-1	(United States) Tony Menefee	TKO	5	2004-08-14	Stadioni KF Prishtina, Pristina, Kosovo	
Win	29-1	(United States) Charles Ward	TKO	3 (6)	2004-03-13	(United States) Gold Strike Casino, Tunica, Mississippi	
Win	28-1	(United States) Thomas Reid	MD	8	2003-12-06	(United States) Madison Square Garden, New York City, New York	
Win	27-1	(United States) James Crawford	TKO	4 (10)	2003-06-27	(United States) Tropicana Hotel & Casino, Atlantic City, New Jersey	
Win	26-1	(United States) Tiwon Taylor	TKO	3 (10)	2003-03-19	(United States) Villa Barone Manor, Bronx, New York	
Win	25-1	(United States) Mike Coker	TKO	1 (6)	2003-01-10	(United States) Mohegan Sun Casino, Uncasville, Connecticut	
Win	24-1	(United States) Sam Ahmad	TKO	3 (10)	2002-07-23	(United States) New Rock City, New Rochelle, New York	
Win	23-1	(United States) Mike Coker	KO	1 (10)	2002-04-23	(United States) Park Central Hotel, New York City, New York	
Win	22-1	(United States) Joseph Harris	TKO	1 (6)	2002-03-17	(United States) Crossville Armory, Crossville, Tennessee	
Win	21-1	(United States) Erin Fitchett	TKO	5 (6)	2002-01-24	(United States) Park Central Hotel, New York City, New York	
Win	20-1	(United States) Darren Whitley	UD	8	2001-04-01	(United States) Club Amazura, Jamaica, Queens, New York	
Win	19-1	(United States) Napoleon Pitt	PTS	8	2001-01-27	(United States) Augusta, Georgia	
Win	18-1	(United States) Ronald Boddie	UD	6	2000-11-21	(United States) Genetti Manor, Dickson City, Pennsylvania	
Win	17-1	(Jamaica) Gary Campbell	TKO	5 (6)	2000-08-22	(United States) DSL Center, Mount Vernon, New York	
Win	16-1	(United States) Danny Sheehan	UD	6	2000-07-07	(United States) Cape Cod Melody Trent, Hyannis, Massachusetts	
Win	15-1	(United States) Jason Dietrich	PTS	6	2000-06-10	(United States) Lincoln, Nebraska	
Win	14-1	(United States) Adrian Miller	KO	1	2000-04-20	(United States) Virginia	
Loss	13-1	(United States) Danny Sheehan	DQ	6 (6)	2000-03-24	(United States) The Blue Horizon, Philadelphia, Pennsylvania	
Win	13-0	(Venezuela) Fermin Chirino	UD	6	1999-11-09	(United States) Yonkers Raceway, Yonkers, New York	
Win	12-0	(United States) Angelo Simpson	UD	6	1999-09-14	(United States) Yonkers Raceway, Yonkers, New York	
Win	11-0	(United States) Boyer Chew	TKO	2	1999-08-26	(United States) Atlanta, Georgia	
Win	10-0	(United States) Steve Ussery	KO	1	1999-08-14	(United States) Portsmouth, Virginia	
Win	9-0	(United States) Angelo Simpson	PTS	4	1999-07-29	(United States) Atlanta, Georgia	
Win	8-0	(United States) Thomas Barker	TKO	2 (4)	1999-06-19	(United States) Madison Square Garden, New York City, New York	
Win	7-0	(United States) Marvin Ladson	KO	1	1999-05-15	(United States) Augusta, Georgia	
Win	6-0	(United States) Walter David	KO	2 (4)	1999-04-07	(United States) Yonkers Raceway, Yonkers, New York	
Win	5-0	(United States) Eric Rhinehart	KO	1 (4)	1999-03-26	(United States) Coliseum, Greensboro, North Carolina	
Win	4-0	(United States) Tyrone Wallace	PTS	4	1999-02-27	(United States) Augusta, Georgia	
Win	3-0	(United States) Johnny Walker	TKO	1 (4)	1999-01-30	(United States) Academy Kickboxing, Garner, North Carolina	
Win	2-0	(United States) Billy Desser	UD	4	18 Jul 1998	(United States) MSG Theater, New York City, New York	
Win	1-0	(United States) Nicholas Robles	TKO	1	1998-06-19	(United States) Atlantic City, New Jersey	Muriqi's professional debut
