= James Butler (boxer) =

American boxer and convicted felon

James Butler Jr.
Personal information
- Nickname: The Harlem Hammer
- Born: December 18, 1972 (age 53) Harlem, New York, U.S.
- Height: 6 ft 0 in (183 cm)
- Weight: Super middleweight

Boxing career
- Stance: Orthodox

Boxing record
- Total fights: 25
- Wins: 20
- Win by KO: 12
- Losses: 5

James Butler Jr. (born December 18, 1972) is an American former professional boxer who competed from 1996 to 2004. He challenged Sven Otke for the IBF super middleweight world title on September 1, 2001. He is famously known for his bout on November 23, 2001 against Richard Grant where he was arrested after the fight for assault. In 2004, Butler was arrested for the murder of Sam Kellerman and was sentenced to 29 years and four months in prison after pleading guilty to voluntary manslaughter.

== Biography ==
Butler started off his career by scoring 18 wins and only 1 loss in the super middleweight division. This led to a title fight against Sven Ottke who beat Butler by unanimous decision.

Butler's next bout earned him infamy. On November 23, 2001, Butler took on Richard Grant on a special edition of ESPN2's Friday Night Fights, at the Roseland Ballroom in New York City. The card was part of a charity event designed to raise money to help assist New York police and fire department personnel that survived the September 11 attacks. The two had met earlier in their careers, fighting in 1996 when they were first starting out as professionals, with Grant winning a four-round decision. The fight went the ten round distance, with all three judges scoring the bout for Grant.

As the two men waited for the results, Butler asked for his gloves to be cut off. After Grant was announced the winner, Butler stood in his corner seeming unpleased by the decision. Grant then made his way over to Butler to congratulate him for his effort, but Butler sucker punched the unsuspecting Grant on his chin that dropped him to the floor. Grant lay dazed on the ring mat and bleeding from the mouth while broadcasters Bob Papa and Teddy Atlas called out for Butler to be arrested on assault charges. Grant suffered a dislocated jaw and lacerated tongue from the unprotected bare knuckle punch, and Butler was eventually convicted of assaulting Grant and spent four months in Rikers Island.

After Butler's assault, he would not return to boxing for three years. Returning as a light heavyweight, he fought four times and lost twice. His last fight was on another ESPN card against former super middleweight contender Omar Sheika, which he lost by split decision on August 10, 2004.

== Killing of Sam Kellerman ==
On October 12, 2004, writer Sam Kellerman (brother of sports analyst Max Kellerman) was killed at his apartment in Los Angeles. Kellerman died of blunt-force trauma to the head, and his body was not found until October 17. Butler was considered a suspect since he had been friends with Kellerman for over 10 years.

On October 20, Butler, accompanied by a lawyer, sought treatment for his alleged bipolar disorder.

Butler was arrested for the Kellerman murder on October 27. Two days later, he pleaded not guilty to murder and arson. He was held on $1.25 million bail. Prosecutors claimed that Butler, the only suspect in the case, repeatedly struck Kellerman in the head with a hammer, then torched Kellerman's Hollywood, California apartment in an attempted cover-up.

On July 8, 2005, a Los Angeles judge ruled there was sufficient evidence for Butler to stand trial on charges of murder and arson.

On March 27, 2006, Butler pleaded guilty to voluntary manslaughter and arson in the 2004 death of Kellerman. On April 5, Butler was sentenced to 29 years and four months in prison by Superior Court Judge Michael Pastor, according to Deputy Public Defender Jack Keenan.

Prosecutors speculated Butler was having relationship issues with his girlfriend while also struggling to revive his boxing career when Kellerman asked Butler to move out. A disagreement ensued on how long Butler could stay when he picked up a hammer and killed Kellerman, then torched his house.

== Professional boxing record ==
25 fights	20 wins	5 losses
By knockout	12	0
By decision	8	5

25	Loss	20–5	(United States) Omar Sheika	SD	10	August 10, 2004	(United States) Essex County College, Newark, New Jersey, U.S.	
24	Win	20–4	(United States) Dan Sheehan	UD	6	June 4, 2004	(United States) PromoWest Pavilion, Columbus, Ohio, U.S.	
23	Win	19–4	(United States) Reggie Strickland	UD	6	May 7, 2004	(United States) Farm Bureau Building, Indianapolis, Indiana, U.S.	
22	Loss	18–4	(United States) Thomas Reid	UD	8	February 27, 2004	(United States) Key Skating Center, Bronx, New York, U.S.	
21	Loss	18–3	(Jamaica) Richard Grant	UD	10	November 23, 2001	(United States) Roseland Ballroom, New York, New York, U.S.	
20	Loss	18–2	(Germany) Sven Ottke	UD	12	September 1, 2001	Bördelandhalle, Magdeburg, Germany	For IBF super-middleweight title
19	Win	18–1	(United States) Jerry Williams	UD	8	March 24, 2001	Bördelandhalle, Magdeburg, Germany	
18	Win	17–1	(United States) Jose Spearman	TKO	6 (12), 0:59	September 29, 2000	(United States) Station Casino, Kansas City, Missouri, U.S.	Retained USBA super middleweight title
17	Win	16–1	(United States) Arthur Allen	TKO	2 (12), 2:03	March 24, 2000	(United States) The Blue Horizon, Philadelphia, Pennsylvania, U.S.	Retained USBA super middleweight title
16	Win	15–1	(United States) Bryant Brannon	KO	7 (12), 0:55	October 29, 1999	(United States) Farm Bureau Building, Indianapolis, Indiana, U.S.	For USBA super middleweight title
15	Win	14–1	(Dominican Republic) Merqui Sosa	TKO	2 (10), 1:02	July 16, 1999	(United States) Hampton Beach Casino Ballroom, Hampton Beach, New Hampshire, U.S.	
14	Win	13–1	(United States) Thomas James	TKO	2 (6)	June 24, 1999	(United States) Atlanta, Georgia, U.S.	
13	Win	12–1	(United States) Jose Hiram Torres	TKO	7 (10)	May 15, 1999	(United States) Leominster, Massachusetts, U.S.	
12	Win	11–1	(United States) Calvin Moody	KO	1 (10)	April 22, 1999	(United States) Virginia, U.S.	
11	Win	10–1	(Uzbekistan) Rufat Baku	UD	10	October 9, 1998	(United States) Capitol Theatre, Port Chester, New York, U.S.	
10	Win	9–1	(United States) Hector Rosario	TKO	6 (8)	September 11, 1998	(United States) Yonkers Raceway, Yonkers, New York, U.S.	
9	Win	8–1	(United States) Tim Dendy	UD	6	March 24, 1998	(United States) Grand Casino, Tunica, Mississippi, U.S.	
8	Win	7–1	(United States) Knowledge Bey	KO	3 (4)	January 24, 1998	(United States) Elks Lodge, Queens, New York, U.S.	
7	Win	6–1	(United States) Malcolm Brooks	PTS	6	October 10, 1997	(United States) Capitol Theatre, Port Chester, New York, U.S.	
6	Win	5–1	(United States) Louis March	PTS	4	September 19, 1997	(United States) Capitol Theatre, Port Chester, New York, U.S.	
5	Win	4–1	(United States) Robert Muhammad	KO	6 (6)	June 18, 1997	(United States) Yonkers Raceway, Yonkers, New York, U.S.	
4	Win	3–1	(United States) Gerald Holmes	KO	1 (4)	April 11, 1997	(United States) Capitol Theatre, Port Chester, New York, U.S.	
3	Loss	2–1	(Jamaica) Richard Grant	PTS	4	January 31, 1997	(United States) Yonkers Raceway, Yonkers, New York, U.S.	
2	Win	2–0	(United States) Derrick Whitley	PTS	4	November 2, 1996	(United States) Hartford, Connecticut, U.S.	
1	Win	1–0	(United States) Eddie Johnson	TKO	1 (4)	October 18, 1996	(United States) Bronx, New York, U.S.	Professional debut
