= Sheika =

Sheika may refer to:

- Sheikha, a female sheikh
- Sheika Scott (born 2006), Costa Rican footballer
- Omar Sheika (born 1977), American boxer
- Sheika River, a river in the Russian North

== See also ==
- Sheikah, a fictional race in The Legend of Zelda franchise
