= Bob Papa =

American sportscaster (born 1964)

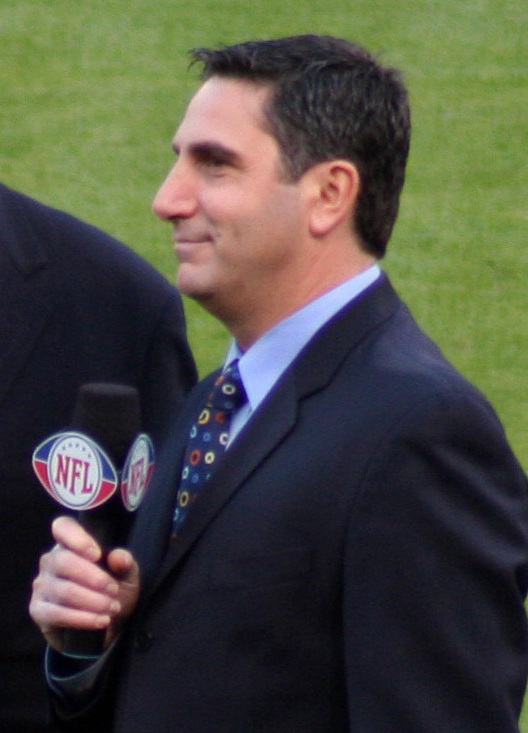
- Papa with the NFL Network
- Born: Robert L. Papa; September 19, 1964 (age 62); Dumont, New Jersey, U.S.
- Education: Fordham University, '86
- Occupation: Sportscaster
- Title: Football commentator, play-by-play, Olympics
- Children: 4

Robert L. Papa (born September 19, 1964) is an American sportscaster who is currently the radio play-by-play voice for the New York Giants of the National Football League (NFL). Papa also is the lead broadcaster for PGA Tour Champions events on Golf Channel and has been the blow-by-blow announcer on many professional boxing telecasts, notably for ESPN and for HBO’s Boxing After Dark series.

== Biography ==
=== Early life ===
Papa grew up in Dumont, New Jersey, and graduated from Bergen Catholic High School in nearby Oradell. He graduated from Fordham University in 1986. He is not related to the San Francisco 49ers broadcaster (and former long-time Oakland Raiders radio voice) Greg Papa. He is the second cousin, once removed, of comedian Tom Papa.

=== Career ===
==== New York Giants (1988–present) ====
He is best known as the radio play-by-play voice of the New York Giants, a position he has held since he replaced Jim Gordon prior to the 1995 season.

He announces all 17 regular season games and all postseason games on the radio, and all of the team's pre-season games for WNBC in New York City and simulcast across the state. During his time with the Giants, he has called the team's victories in Super Bowl XLII and Super Bowl XLVI, as well as their loss to the Baltimore Ravens in Super Bowl XXXV.

From 1988 to 1994, he worked on the Giants' pregame and postgame shows on the radio. His work with the Giants also includes his role as host of the YES Network's Giants Training Camp Report, and Giants Access Blue, Giants Chronicles, and Giants Online.

Papa served as chairman of the Giants’ Top 100 Players Committee in honor of the franchise’s 100th season and was a member of the 13-person panel that selected the Top 100 Players in Giants history.

==== Other work ====
Additionally, Papa was the voice of Thursday Night Football on NFL Network from 2008 until 2010. He files pregame and postgame reports from New York Giants games on Sundays for NFL GameDay Morning and contributes to NFL.com with columns, chats and reports. He works for the Golf Channel during the NFL off-season.

In addition, he was added as a member for Golf Channel and has called boxing for HBO, SportsChannel America, ESPN, NBC, and Versus. Papa called the infamous November 23, 2001, match between James Butler and Richard Grant on Friday Night Fights.

At fight's end, after Grant had been declared the winner, Butler sucker-punched Grant, breaking his jaw. Both Papa and his color commentator, Teddy Atlas, loudly called for both Butler's arrest, and permanent suspension from boxing. Butler later pleaded guilty to the slaying of artist/writer Sam Kellerman.

Papa was the radio voice for the New Jersey Nets on WOR for several years in the mid-1990s after Ian Eagle was promoted to television.

From 1989–92, he was the studio host for NHL on SportsChannel America. Denis Potvin was his analyst. From 2008 to 2010, he did play-by-play on NFL games that took place on NFL Network before being replaced by Brad Nessler.

==== Olympics ====
A graduate of Fordham University, Papa, along with two more alumni, participated in the 2004 Summer Olympics held in Athens. Papa worked on NBC's coverage of the Olympics since 1992, as he covered boxing at the 2008 Summer Olympics.

In 2002, he covered cross-country skiing and curling. In 2010, he covered luge, skeleton, and bobsled. He served as the play by play announcer for NBC Sports coverage of Boxing at the 2008 Summer Olympics. He called Rugby at the 2016 Summer Olympics.

== Personal life ==
Papa has four sons: Christopher, Will, Nicholas, and Max.

| Preceded by Bryant Gumbel | Thursday Night Football play-by-play commentator 2008–2010 | Succeeded by Brad Nessler |
