= Omar Sheika =

American boxer

Personal information
- Nationality: American
- Born: February 20, 1977 (age 49) Paterson, New Jersey, U.S.
- Height: 6 ft (183 cm)
- Weight: Light heavyweight Super middleweight

Boxing career
- Reach: 70 in (178 cm)
- Stance: Orthodox

Boxing record
- Total fights: 44
- Wins: 32
- Win by KO: 21
- Losses: 12

Omar Sheika (born February 20, 1977) is an American former professional boxer who competed from 1997 to 2012. He challenged four times for the super middleweight championship; once for the WBO title in 2000; twice for the WBC title in 2002 and 2005; and once for the IBF title in 2004.

== Early life ==
He is of Palestinian descent. Raised in Paterson, New Jersey, Sheika attended Eastside High School and has been a resident of Woodland Park, New Jersey.

== Amateur career ==
Sheika compiled a successful amateur career, capturing a National Middleweight Championship at National AAU Boxing Tournament in 1996.

== Professional career ==
Sheika has enjoyed some success in his pro career. His first fight was against Billy James. Sheika won the fight by TKO on the second round. Sheika stayed undefeated for about a year.

Sheika was involved in ESPN Friday Night Fights "Fight of the Year" in both 2003 and 2004.

Sheika defeated now-imprisoned boxer James Butler in late 2004. Sheika also beat future IBF light heavyweight champion Glen Johnson, who went on to beat Antonio Tarver.

Omar Sheika won against Garrett Wilson on March 26, 2010, by a 4th-round TKO. On June 18, 2010, Omar continued his winning streak, beating Jim Strohl by a 3rd-round TKO.

Sheika suffered his tenth career loss on October 15, 2010, against Adrian Diaconu, with Diaconu winning by unanimous decision after ten rounds of boxing despite Sheika flooring Diaconu with a right earlier in the fight.

On April 23, 2011, Omar lost by unanimous decision against Garrett Wilson after twelve rounds of boxing. The fight was for the vacant USBA Cruiserweight title.

On January 21, 2012, he beat Charles Hayward by unanimous decision over 10 rounds for his title belt, the inaugural "Bad and Mean" Cruiserweight title, though it was fought at the light heavyweight limit of 175 pounds..

On April 27, 2012, Sheika fought Yusaf Mack, losing via unanimous decision. The fight was for the USBA Light Heavyweight title.

== Professional boxing record ==
32 Wins (21 knockouts, 11 decisions), 12 Losses (4 knockouts, 8 decision)
Result	Record	Opponent	Type	Round	Date	Location	Notes
Loss	32-12	(United States) Yusaf Mack	UD	12	27/04/2012	(United States) Resorts Casino Hotel, Atlantic City, New Jersey	IBF USBA Light Heavyweight Title.
Win	32-11	(United States) Anthony Ferrante	UD	10	24/02/2012	(United States) Harrah's Chester, Chester, Pennsylvania	99-90, 95-94, 99-90.
Win	31-11	(United States) Charles Hayward	MD	10	21/01/2012	(United States) Hamilton Manor, Hamilton, New Jersey	BAM Cruiserweight Title. 97-93, 95-95, 96-94.
Loss	30-11	(United States) Garrett "Ultimate Warrior" Wilson	UD	12	23/04/2011	(United States) Caesars Atlantic City, Atlantic City, New Jersey	IBF USBA Light Heavyweight Title. 109-118, 109-118, 108-119.
Loss	30-10	(Romania) Adrian Diaconu	UD	10	15/10/2010	(Canada) Bell Centre, Montreal, Quebec	91-98, 92-97, 92-98.
Win	30-9	(United States) Jim Strohl	TKO	3	18/06/2010	(United States) Cedar Gardens, Hamilton, New Jersey	Referee stopped the bout at 2:01 of the third round.
Win	29-9	(United States) Garrett "Ultimate Warrior" Wilson	TKO	4	26/03/2010	(United States) Hamilton Manor, Hamilton, New Jersey	Referee stopped the bout at 1:32 of the fourth round.
Win	28-9	(United States) Theo Kruger	TKO	8	23/09/2009	(United States) Verizon Wireless Arena, Manchester, New Hampshire	Referee stopped the bout at 2:38 of the eighth round.
Loss	27-9	(United States) Roy Jones Jr.	TKO	5	21/03/2009	(United States) Pensacola Civic Center, Pensacola, Florida	WBO NABO Light Heavyweight Title. Referee stopped the bout at 1:45 of the fifth round.
Win	27-8	(United States) Tiwon Taylor	TKO	4	29/09/2007	(United States) Boardwalk Hall, Atlantic City, New Jersey	Referee stopped the bout at 2:25 of the fourth round.
Loss	26-8	(Germany) Markus Beyer	UD	12	03/09/2005	(Germany) International Congress Centrum, Charlottenburg, Berlin	WBC World Super Middleweight Title. 110-118, 112-116, 112-116.
Loss	26-7	(United States) Jeff Lacy	UD	12	04/12/2004	(United States) Mandalay Bay, Las Vegas, Nevada	IBF World Super Middleweight Title. 111-117, 113-115, 113-115.
Win	26-6	(United States) James "Harlem Hammer" Butler	SD	10	10/08/2004	(United States) Essex County College, Newark, New Jersey	96-94, 97-93, 94-96.
Win	25-6	(Cameroon) Manu Ntoh	UD	10	15/06/2004	(United States) The Belvedere, Elk Grove Village, Illinois	98-92, 98-92, 97-93.
Win	24-6	(United States) Etianne Whitaker	KO	2	14/05/2004	(United States) Asylum Arena, Philadelphia, Pennsylvania	
Loss	23-6	(United States) Scott Pemberton	TKO	10	23/01/2004	(United States) Foxwoods, Mashantucket, Connecticut	IBU World/WBC NABF Super Middleweight Titles. Referee stopped the bout at 1:43 of the tenth round.
Loss	23-5	(United States) Scott Pemberton	SD	12	25/07/2003	(United States) Foxwoods, Mashantucket, Connecticut	IBU World/WBC NABF Super Middleweight Titles. 113-114, 113-114, 116-111.
Loss	23-4	(Canada) Eric Lucas	UD	12	06/09/2002	(Canada) Bell Centre, Montreal, Quebec	WBC World Super Middleweight Title. 111-117, 111-117, 109-119.
Loss	23-3	(United States) Thomas Tate	RTD	4	05/10/2001	(United States) First Union Center, Philadelphia, Pennsylvania	IBF USBA Super Middleweight Title/World Title Eliminator. Doctor called off the bout after the fourth round.
Win	23-2	(Puerto Rico) Lionel Ortiz	TKO	7	08/06/2001	(United States) Turning Stone Resort & Casino, Verona, New York	
Win	22-2	(Canada) Stephane Ouellet	TKO	2	07/04/2001	(United States) MGM Grand Garden Arena, Las Vegas, Nevada	Referee stopped the bout at 1:46 of the second round.
Win	21-2	(Jamaica) Lloyd Bryan	TKO	1	24/11/2000	(United States) JFK High School, Paterson, New Jersey	Referee stopped the bout at 2:47 of the first round.
Loss	20-2	(Wales) Joe Calzaghe	TKO	5	12/08/2000	(United Kingdom) Wembley Conference Centre, Wembley, London	WBO World Super Middleweight Title. Referee stopped the bout at 2:08 of the fifth round.
Win	20-1	(Jamaica) Glen "Road Warrior" Johnson	MD	10	02/06/2000	(United States) The Blue Horizon, Philadelphia, Pennsylvania	95-95, 96-93, 96-93.
Win	19-1	(Jamaica) Simon "Mantequilla" Brown	UD	8	08/01/2000	(United States) The Pit, Albuquerque, New Mexico	80-72, 79-72, 78-73.
Win	18-1	(United States) Kevin Pompey	TKO	8	07/08/1999	(United States) Trump Taj Mahal, Atlantic City, New Jersey	
Win	17-1	(United States) Demetrius Jenkins	TKO	3	14/05/1999	(United States) Pikesville Armory, Pikesville, Maryland	Referee stopped the bout at 2:15 of the third round.
Win	16-1	(United States) Anwar Oshana	TKO	3	22/01/1999	(United States) Carmichael's, Chicago, Illinois	Referee stopped the bout at 0:31 of the third round.
Win	15-1	(United States) Ray Domenge	KO	2	31 Oct 1998	(United States) Atlantic City Convention Center, Atlantic City, New Jersey	
Loss	14-1	(United Kingdom) Tony Booth	PTS	8	18/07/1998	(United Kingdom) Sheffield Arena, Sheffield, Yorkshire	76-77.
Win	14-0	(United Kingdom) Toks Owoh	TKO	4	25/04/1998	Wales National Ice Rink, Cardiff	Referee stopped the bout at 2:00 of the fourth round.
Win	13-0	(United Kingdom) Paul Wesley	RTD	4	07/03/1998	(United Kingdom) Rivermead Leisure Centre, Reading, Berkshire	Wesley retired after the fourth round.
Win	12-0	(United States) Demetrius Davis	MD	8	02/12/1997	(United States) The Blue Horizon, Philadelphia, Pennsylvania	
Win	11-0	(United States) Maurice Bruton	TKO	2	11/11/1997	(United States) War Memorial Auditorium, Fort Lauderdale, Florida	Referee stopped the bout at 2:58 of the second round.
Win	10-0	(United States) Pat Pernsley	UD	6	28/10/1997	(United States) The Blue Horizon, Philadelphia, Pennsylvania	
Win	9-0	(United States) Chris Cuellar	TKO	2	07/10/1997	(United States) The Palace of Auburn Hills, Auburn Hills, Michigan	
Win	8-0	(United States) Tyrone Glover	UD	8	01/09/1997	(United States) Medieval Times, Lyndhurst, New Jersey	
Win	7-0	(United States) Sean Sample	TKO	1	29/07/1997	(United States) MSG Theater, New York City	Referee stopped the bout at 0:49 of the first round.
Win	6-0	(United States) Jose "Bert" Burgos	KO	1	24/06/1997	(United States) Argosy Festival Atrium, Baton Rouge, Louisiana	Burgos knocked out at 0:31 of the first round.
Win	5-0	(United States) Robert Doyle	TKO	2	03/06/1997	(United States) The Blue Horizon, Philadelphia, Pennsylvania	
Win	4-0	(United States) John James	UD	4	20/05/1997	(United States) Medieval Times, Lyndhurst, New Jersey	
Win	3-0	(Canada) Maxime Belanger	TKO	2	06/05/1997	(United States) Medieval Times, Lyndhurst, New Jersey	
Win	2-0	(United States) Will McIntyre	UD	4	15/04/1997	(United States) West Orange, New Jersey	
Win	1-0	(United States) Billy James	TKO	2	18/03/1997	(United States) IMA Sports Arena, Flint, Michigan	Referee stopped the bout at 1:39 of the second round.
