= Glen Johnson (boxer) =

Jamaican boxer (born 1969)

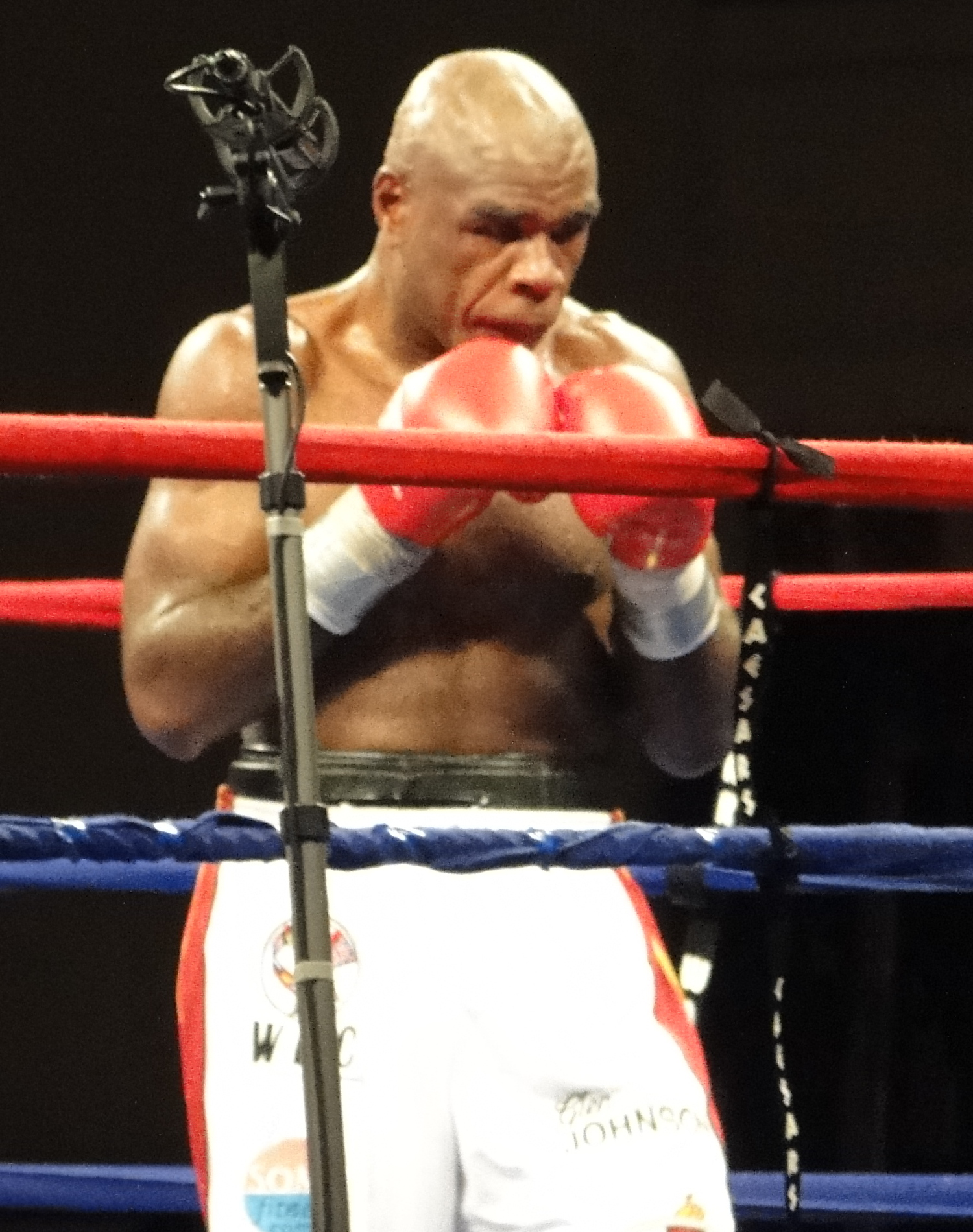

Personal information
- Nicknames: Gentleman; The Road Warrior
- Born: Glengoffe Donovan Johnson; 2 January 1969 (age 57) Clarendon Parish, Jamaica
- Height: 5 ft 9 in (175 cm)
- Weight: Middleweight; Super middleweight; Light heavyweight; Cruiserweight

Boxing career
- Reach: 75 in (191 cm)
- Stance: Orthodox

Boxing record
- Total fights: 77
- Wins: 54
- Win by KO: 37
- Losses: 21
- Draws: 2

Glengoffe Donovan Bartholomew Johnson (born 2 January 1969) is a Jamaican former professional boxer who competed from 1993 to 2015. He held the IBF, IBO and Ring magazine light heavyweight titles between 2004 and 2005, and challenged once each for world titles at middleweight and super middleweight.

He was named Fighter of the Year in 2004 by The Ring, the Boxing Writers Association of America, and BoxingScene for his upset knockout victory over Roy Jones Jr. Throughout his career, Johnson was well known for his exceptionally durable chin and relentless pressure fighting style.

== Amateur career ==
Johnson arrived in South Florida from Jamaica at the age of 15. He would not begin boxing as an amateur until a few years later. Glen "The Road Warrior" Johnson was a late bloomer of the sport, starting at 20 years old in Miami, Florida, at an emerging police boxing gym. Johnson compiled an amateur record of 35–5 and was a two-time Florida State Golden Gloves Champion, once at 165 and at the other at 178 pounds.

== Professional career ==
Johnson won his first 32 professional fights before challenging Bernard Hopkins for the IBF middleweight title in 1997. Johnson was stopped on his feet in the 11th round. He added eight more to his tally of losses, many of them debatable decisions where Johnson was adjudged to have lost to the hometown fighter. He journeyed to England and suffered a controversial draw against Clinton Woods, but defeated him in a rematch by unanimous decision to win the IBF light heavyweight title.

=== Johnson vs. Jones Jr. ===
His next fight came against former undisputed light heavyweight champion Roy Jones Jr., who entered following an upset loss to Antonio Tarver earlier that year. In another upset, Johnson knocked Jones out in the ninth round of their September 2004 fight.

=== Johnson vs. Tarver, Woods III, Griffin ===
The subsequent split decision victory over Antonio Tarver that December made him IBO and The Ring light heavyweight boxing champion. He was chosen the 2004 fighter of the year by the Boxing Writer's Association of America. Johnson lost the light heavyweight title to Antonio Tarver in the rematch. He then challenged old foe Woods once again for the IBF title. This time Woods beat him by a split decision. He then came back and defeated former champion Montell Griffin in May 2007.

=== Johnson vs. Dawson, Cloud ===
Johnson lost a unanimous decision to Chad Dawson on April 12, 2008, for the WBC light heavyweight title. On November 7, 2009, Johnson lost a rematch with Dawson via unanimous decision in Hartford, Connecticut. The judges scores were 115–113, 115–113 and 117–111 for Dawson.

On August 7, 2010, Johnson challenged Tavoris Cloud for the IBF light heavyweight title but lost a close decision 116–112 from all 3 judges despite landing more punches according to CompuBox.

=== Super Six World Boxing Classic ===
Glen Johnson joined the Super Six World Boxing Classic replacing Mikkel Kessler due to Kessler eye injury. Glen Johnson defeated Allan Green by a knockout in the eighth round, on November 6, 2010, in Las Vegas, Nevada and with that win proceeded to the Semi-Final of the Super 6 Tournament where he faced Carl Froch for a place in the Super 6 Final and WBC world super-middleweight title. Johnson Lost the fight by majority decision with one judge scoring the contest a draw and the remaining two judges scoring in favour of Froch.

== Professional boxing record ==
77 fights	54 wins	21 losses
By knockout	37	2
By decision	17	19
Draws	2	

No.	Result	Record	Opponent	Type	Round, time	Date	Location	Notes
77	Loss	54–21–2	Avni Yıldırım	UD	10	15 Aug 2015	Mana Wynwood Convention Center, Miami, Florida, US	For vacant WBC Silver International light heavyweight title
76	Loss	54–20–2	Erik Skoglund	UD	10	13 Dec 2014	MusikTeatret Albertslund, Copenhagen, Denmark	
75	Loss	54–19–2	Ilunga Makabu	TKO	9 (12), 2:40	28 Jun 2014	Grand Hôtel, Kinshasa, DR Congo	For vacant WBC International cruiserweight title
74	Win	54–18–2	Jaime Velasquez	TKO	4 (8), 1:59	21 Feb 2014	Twin River Event Center, Lincoln, Rhode Island, US	
73	Win	53–18–2	Bobby Gunn	UD	8	18 Dec 2013	Sands Casino Resort, Bethlehem, Pennsylvania, US	
72	Win	52–18–2	Junior Ramos	TKO	2 (10), 0:37	19 Apr 2013	Polideportivo San Martín de PorresLa Romana, Dominican Republic	
71	Loss	51–18–2	George Groves	UD	12	15 Dec 2012	ExCeL, London, England	For Commonwealth super middleweight title
70	Loss	51–17–2	Andrzej Fonfara	UD	10	13 Jul 2012	UIC Pavilion, Chicago, Illinois, US	
69	Loss	51–16–2	Lucian Bute	UD	12	5 Nov 2011	Colisée Pepsi, Quebec City, Quebec, Canada	For IBF super middleweight title
68	Loss	51–15–2	Carl Froch	MD	12	4 Jun 2011	Boardwalk Hall, Atlantic City, New Jersey, US	For WBC super middleweight title; Super Six World Boxing Classic: semi-final
67	Win	51–14–2	Allan Green	TKO	8 (12), 0:36	6 Nov 2010	MGM Grand Garden Arena, Paradise, Nevada, US	
66	Loss	50–14–2	Tavoris Cloud	UD	12	7 Aug 2010	Scottrade Center, Saint Louis, Missouri, US	For IBF light heavyweight title
65	Win	50–13–2	Yusaf Mack	TKO	6 (12), 2:21	5 Feb 2010	Don Taft University Center Arena, Fort Lauderdale, Florida, US	
64	Loss	49–13–2	Chad Dawson	UD	12	7 Nov 2009	XL Center, Hartford, Connecticut, US	For IBO and vacant WBC interim light heavyweight titles
63	Win	49–12–2	Daniel Judah	UD	10	27 Feb 2009	Hard Rock Live, Hollywood, Florida, US	
62	Win	48–12–2	Aaron Norwood	TKO	4 (10), 1:20	11 Nov 2008	Hard Rock Live, Hollywood, Florida, US	
61	Loss	47–12–2	Chad Dawson	UD	12	12 Apr 2008	St. Pete Times Forum, Tampa, Florida, US	For WBC light heavyweight title
60	Win	47–11–2	Hugo Pineda	TKO	8 (10), 0:49	15 Jan 2008	Bally's Park Place, Atlantic City, New Jersey, US	
59	Win	46–11–2	Fred Moore	KO	5 (10), 2:45	27 Jul 2007	Sheraton Hotel, Miami, Florida, US	
58	Win	45–11–2	Montell Griffin	TKO	11 (12), 2:38	16 May 2007	Hard Rock Live, Hollywood, Florida, US	
57	Loss	44–11–2	Clinton Woods	SD	12	2 Sep 2006	Bolton Arena, Bolton, England	For IBF light heavyweight title
56	Win	44–10–2	Richard Hall	UD	12	24 Feb 2006	Hard Rock Live, Hollywood, Florida, US	Won vacant IBA light heavyweight title
55	Win	43–10–2	George Khalid Jones	TKO	10 (12), 2:30	30 Sep 2005	Cache Creek Casino Resort, Brooks, California, US	
54	Loss	42–10–2	Antonio Tarver	UD	12	18 Jun 2005	FedExForum, Memphis, Tennessee, US	Lost IBO and The Ring light heavyweight titles
53	Win	42–9–2	Antonio Tarver	SD	12	18 Dec 2004	Staples Center, Los Angeles, California, US	Won IBO and The Ring light heavyweight titles
52	Win	41–9–2	Roy Jones Jr.	KO	9 (12), 0:48	25 Sep 2004	FedExForum, Memphis, Tennessee, US	Retained IBF light heavyweight title
51	Win	40–9–2	Clinton Woods	UD	12	6 Feb 2004	Ponds Forge, Sheffield, England	Won vacant IBF light heavyweight title
50	Draw	39–9–2	Clinton Woods	SD	12	7 Nov 2003	Hillsborough Leisure Centre, Sheffield, England	For vacant IBF light heavyweight title
49	Win	39–9–1	Eric Harding	UD	12	18 May 2003	Jimmy's Bronx Cafe, New York City, New York, US	Won vacant USBA light heavyweight title
48	Draw	38–9–1	Daniel Judah	SD	10	4 Apr 2003	Mohegan Sun Arena, Montville, Connecticut, US	
47	Loss	38–9	Julio César González	MD	10	24 Jan 2003	Crowne Plaza, Commerce, California, US	
46	Loss	38–8	Derrick Harmon	UD	10	14 Apr 2002	The Joint, Paradise, Nevada, US	
45	Win	38–7	Thomas Ulrich	KO	6 (12)	28 Jul 2001	Estrel Hotel, Berlin, Germany	Won WBO Inter-Continental light heavyweight title
44	Win	37–7	Toks Owoh	TKO	6 (12), 2:05	23 Sep 2000	York Hall, London, England	Won vacant IBF Inter-Continental super middleweight title
43	Loss	36–7	Omar Sheika	MD	10	2 Jun 2000	The Blue Horizon, Philadelphia, Pennsylvania, US	
42	Loss	36–6	Silvio Branco	UD	12	15 Apr 2000	Padua, Italy	For vacant WBU super middleweight title
41	Loss	36–5	Syd Vanderpool	UD	10	28 Jan 2000	The Ruins, New Orleans, Louisiana, US	
40	Loss	36–4	Sven Ottke	UD	12	27 Nov 1999	Philips Halle, Düsseldorf, Germany	For IBF super middleweight title
39	Win	36–3	Marcelo Zimmerman	TKO	1 (12)	16 Oct 1999	Oranjestad, Aruba	Retained WBC Continental Americas super middleweight title
38	Win	35–3	Augustine Renteria	TKO	4 (10), 1:33	31 Jul 1999	Chumash Casino Resort, Santa Ynez, California, US	
37	Win	34–3	Troy Watson	UD	12	22 Apr 1999	Hilton Anatole, Dallas, Texas, US	Won vacant WBC Continental Americas super middleweight title
36	Win	33–3	Armando Campas	KO	6 (10)	26 Feb 1999	Hopland Sho-Ka-Wah Casino, Hopland, California, US	
35	Loss	32–3	Joseph Kiwanuka	SD	10	4 Aug 1998	The Palace, Auburn Hills, Michigan, US	
34	Loss	32–2	Merqui Sosa	UD	10	13 Dec 1997	Concord Plaza Expo Center, Northlake, Illinois, US	
33	Loss	32–1	Bernard Hopkins	TKO	11 (12), 1:23	20 Jul 1997	Fantasy Springs Resort Casino, Indio, California, US	For IBF middleweight title
32	Win	32–0	Dave Hamilton	TKO	2 (10), 2:42	7 Jun 1997	Hawthorne Race Course, Cicero, Illinois, US	
31	Win	31–0	Sam Garr	UD	10	25 Feb 1997	The Pyramid, Long Beach, California, US	
30	Win	30–0	Ralph Monday	KO	1 (10)	6 Dec 1996	Miami, Florida, US	
29	Win	29–0	Stacy Goodson	KO	2 (10)	2 Nov 1996	Nassau, Bahamas	
28	Win	28–0	Jeff Johnson	TKO	5 (10)	1 Oct 1996	War Memorial Auditorium, Fort Lauderdale, Florida, US	
27	Win	27–0	David McCluskey	TKO	3	24 Aug 1996	Valdosta, Georgia, US	
26	Win	26–0	Gerald Reed	UD	10	29 Jul 1996	Cafe Casablanca, Hallandale, Florida, US	
25	Win	25–0	Tom Bentley	TKO	3 (8)	15 Jun 1996	Nassau, Bahamas	
24	Win	24–0	James Gatlin	MD	6	11 Jun 1996	Foxwoods Resort Casino, Ledyard, Connecticut, US	
23	Win	23–0	Kenneth Parker	TKO	3	2 Apr 1996	Atlantis Casino, Sint Maarten, Netherlands Antilles	
22	Win	22–0	Guy Stanford	TKO	2	26 Mar 1996	Immokalee, Florida, US	
21	Win	21–0	Danny Mitchell	KO	2	24 Feb 1996	Seville Beach Hotel, Miami Beach, Florida, US	
20	Win	20–0	Bill Bradley	KO	1	16 Jan 1996	War Memorial Auditorium, Fort Lauderdale, Florida, US	
19	Win	19–0	Jerome Hill	TKO	1	28 Nov 1995	William B. Bell Auditorium, Augusta, Georgia, US	
18	Win	18–0	Melvin Wynn	TKO	4, 2:12	8 Sep 1995	Hialeah, Florida, US	
17	Win	17–0	Jesus Carlos Velez	TKO	2 (6)	22 Jul 1995	Miami Beach, Florida, US	
16	Win	16–0	John McClendon	KO	1 (6), 2:47	27 Jun 1995	War Memorial Auditorium, Fort Lauderdale, Florida, US	
15	Win	15–0	Tyrone Dillard	KO	1, 1:48	25 Mar 1995	Miami Beach, Florida, US	
14	Win	14–0	Carlos Betancourt	TKO	1	25 Feb 1995	Miami Beach, Florida, US	
13	Win	13–0	Edison Martinez	KO	3 (10), 2:20	6 Feb 1995	Ramada Hotel, West Palm Beach, Florida, US	
12	Win	12–0	Bill Bradley	UD	10	16 Dec 1994	Miami Beach, Florida, US	
11	Win	11–0	Jesus Carlos Velez	SD	8	19 Nov 1994	Miami Beach, Florida, US	
10	Win	10–0	Gustavo Gonzalez	UD	6	15 Oct 1994	Miami Beach, Florida, US	
9	Win	9–0	Joe Harris	TKO	4	8 Sep 1994	Rodeo Arena, Davie, Florida, US	
8	Win	8–0	Jesus Carlos Velez	UD	6	3 Sep 1994	Miami Beach, Florida, US	
7	Win	7–0	Vincent Godbolt	KO	3	5 Aug 1994	Miami Beach, Florida, US	
6	Win	6–0	Ralph Monday	UD	4	8 Apr 1994	Cape Coral, Florida, US	
5	Win	5–0	Dwayne Waldon	UD	6	22 Oct 1993	War Memorial Auditorium, Fort Lauderdale, Florida, US	
4	Win	4–0	Anthony Brooks	MD	4	30 Aug 1993	War Memorial Auditorium, Fort Lauderdale, Florida, US	
3	Win	3–0	James Mullins	KO	3 (4)	26 Jun 1993	Newcastle, North Carolina, US	
2	Win	2–0	Jerry Reyes	KO	3 (4)	27 Mar 1993	George Town, Cayman Islands	
1	Win	1–0	Yurek Del Rio	TKO	1 (4)	19 Feb 1993	Airport Hilton, Fort Lauderdale, Florida, US	

Sporting positions
Regional boxing titles
Vacant Title last held by Pedro Montiel	WBC Continental Americas super middleweight champion 22 April 1999 – November 1999; Vacated	Vacant Title next held by Ross Thompson
Vacant Title last held by Branko Sobot	IBF Inter-Continental super middleweight champion 23 September 2000 – July 2001; Vacated	Succeeded by Jerry Elliot
Preceded by Thomas Ulrich	WBO Inter-Continental light heavyweight champion 28 July 2001 – October 2002; Vacated	Succeeded by Zsolt Erdei
Vacant Title last held by Antonio Tarver	USBA light heavyweight champion 18 May 2003 – 7 November 2003; Lost bid for IBF title	Vacant Title next held by Eric Harding
Minor world boxing titles
Preceded by Antonio Tarver	IBO light heavyweight champion 18 December 2004 – 18 June 2005	Succeeded by Antonio Tarver
Vacant Title last held by Antonio Tarver	IBA light heavyweight champion 24 February 2006 – February 2008; Vacated	Vacant Title next held by Reggie Johnson
Major world boxing titles
Vacant Title last held by Antonio Tarver	IBF light heavyweight champion 6 February 2004 – 4 November 2004; Vacated	Vacant Title next held by Clinton Woods
Preceded by Antonio Tarver	The Ring light heavyweight champion 18 December 2004 – 18 June 2005	Succeeded by Antonio Tarver
Awards
Previous: James Toney	The Ring Fighter of the Year; 2004	Next: Ricky Hatton
Previous: James Toney	BWAA Fighter of the Year; 2004	Next: Ricky Hatton
Inaugural recipient	ESPN Fighter of the Year; 2004	Next: Ricky Hatton
Previous: Corrie Sanders; ТKO2 Wladimir Klitschko	The Ring Upset of the Year; KO9 Roy Jones Jr. 2004	Next: Zahir Raheem; UD12 Érik Morales
