= Éric Lucas =

Canadian boxer

Personal information
- Nickname: Lucky Lucas
- Born: May 29, 1971 (age 55) Montreal, Quebec, Canada
- Height: 6 ft 0 in (183 cm)
- Weight: Super middleweight Light heavyweight Cruiserweight

Boxing career
- Reach: 74 in (188 cm)
- Stance: orthodox

Boxing record
- Total fights: 50
- Wins: 39
- Win by KO: 15
- Losses: 8
- Draws: 3
- No contests: 0

Éric Lucas (born May 29, 1971) is a Canadian former professional boxer.

== Professional career ==
Lucas turned pro in 1991 and came up short in his first two title shots, against WBC Light Heavyweight Title holder Fabrice Tiozzo in 1996 and IBF Super Middleweight Title holder Roy Jones Jr. later that year. He lost the fight to Jones after Jones had played a basketball game earlier that day. Lucas won the WBC title from Briton Glenn Catley in 2001. He defended it three times before losing a controversial split decision to Markus Beyer in Germany in April 2003.

Eric Lucas, a former WBC super-middleweight world champion, announced his retirement following a 10th-round TKO loss to WBA super-middleweight champion Mikkel Kessler in Copenhagen. His career record stands at 38-7-3, 14 knockouts. Lucas is now the president of InterBox, a boxing promotion company which also employs his former trainer Stéphan Larouche.

Lucas came back to the ring in Montreal on December 11, 2009, winning against Ramon Pedro Moyabo by KO in the 4th round. He subsequently faced Librado Andrade on May 28, 2010, in Quebec City. Lucas fought gallantly, but due to a deep cut near his left eye, the fight was stopped just before the 9th round was to begin. This loss marked the end to an 18-year boxing career, the fight occurring just one day before his 39th birthday.

== Professional boxing record ==
50 fights	39 wins	8 losses
By knockout	15	5
By decision	24	3
Draws	3	

No.	Result	Record	Opponent	Type	Round, time	Date	Location	Notes
50	Loss	39–8–3	Librado Andrade	RTD	8 (10)	2010-05-28	Colisée Pepsi, Quebec City, Quebec, Canada	
49	Win	39–7–3	Ramon Pedro Moyano	KO	4 (8)	2009-12-11	Bell Centre, Montréal, Quebec, Canada	
48	Loss	38–7–3	Mikkel Kessler	TKO	10 (12)	2006-01-14	Brøndbyhallen, Brøndby, Denmark	For WBA super middleweight title
47	Win	38–6–3	James Crawford	UD	12	2005-03-18	Bell Centre, Montréal, Quebec, Canada	Won WBC Continental Americas cruiserweight title
46	Win	37–6–3	Tony Menefee	TKO	2 (10)	2004-12-03	Bell Centre, Montréal, Quebec, Canada	
45	Loss	36–6–3	Danny Green	TKO	6 (12)	2003-12-20	Bell Centre, Montréal, Quebec, Canada	For interim WBC super middleweight title
44	Loss	36–5–3	Markus Beyer	SD	12	2003-04-05	Leipziger Arena, Leipzig, Germany	Lost WBC super middleweight title
43	Win	36–4–3	Omar Sheika	UD	12	2002-09-06	Molson Centre, Montréal, Quebec, Canada	Retained WBC super middleweight title
42	Win	35–4–3	Vinny Pazienza	UD	12	2002-03-01	Foxwoods Resort, Mashantucket, Connecticut, U.S.	Retained WBC super middleweight title
41	Win	34–4–3	Dingaan Thobela	TKO	8 (12)	2001-11-30	Molson Centre, Montréal, Quebec, Canada	Retained WBC super middleweight title
40	Win	33–4–3	Glenn Catley	KO	7 (12)	2001-07-10	Molson Centre, Montréal, Quebec, Canada	Won vacant WBC super middleweight title
39	Win	32–4–3	John Lennox Lewis	TKO	6 (8)	2000-05-09	Molson Centre, Montréal, Quebec, Canada	
38	Loss	31–4–3	Glenn Catley	TKO	12 (12)	1999-12-10	Molson Centre, Montréal, Quebec, Canada	
37	Win	31–3–3	Alex Hilton	UD	10	1999-10-13	Molson Centre, Montréal, Quebec, Canada	
36	Win	30–3–3	LaVerne Clark	KO	5 (10)	1999-05-28	Molson Centre, Montréal, Quebec, Canada	
35	Win	29–3–3	Patrick Swann	UD	10	1999-03-12	Centre Pierre Charbonneau, Montréal, Quebec, Canada	
34	Win	28–3–3	Juan Carlos Viloria	UD	10	1998-11-27	Molson Centre, Montréal, Quebec, Canada	Retained WBC International super middleweight title
33	Win	27–3–3	Anthony Atkinson	KO	4 (8)	1998-10-14	Centre Pierre Charbonneau, Montréal, Quebec, Canada	
32	Win	26–3–3	Jamie Stevenson	TKO	2 (8)	1998-05-05	Pavillon de la Jeunesse, Trois-Rivières, Quebec, Canada	
31	Win	25–3–3	Segundo Mercado	KO	5 (12)	1998-04-03	Molson Centre, Montréal, Quebec, Canada	Won WBC International super middleweight title
30	Win	24–3–3	Kevin Pompey	UD	10	1997-11-11	Casino de Montréal, Montréal, Quebec, Canada	
29	Win	23–3–3	Demetrius Davis	UD	10	1997-07-30	Molson Centre, Montréal, Quebec, Canada	
28	Win	22–3–3	Darrell Flint	KO	7 (12)	1997-03-24	Le Medley, Montréal, Quebec, Canada	Won vacant Canada light heavyweight title
27	Draw	21–3–3	Antwun Echols	PTS	10	1996-12-06	Centre Georges-Vézina, Chicoutimi, Quebec, Canada	
26	Win	21–3–2	Willie Lee Kemp	UD	8	1996-11-08	Jonquière, Quebec, Canada	
25	Win	20–3–2	Richard Frazier	SD	10	1996-10-11	International Plaza Hotel, Toronto, Ontario, Canada	
24	Loss	19–3–2	Roy Jones Jr.	RTD	11 (12)	1996-06-15	Jacksonville Coliseum, Jacksonville, Florida, U.S.	For IBF super middleweight title
23	Win	19–2–2	Karl Willis	TKO	2 (10)	1996-05-07	Colisée de Trois-Rivières, Trois-Rivières, Quebec, Canada	
22	Loss	18–2–2	Fabrice Tiozzo	UD	12	1996-01-13	Palais des Spectacular, Saint-Étienne, France	For WBC light heavyweight title
21	Win	18–1–2	Eric Martin	UD	8	1995-12-02	Palais des Sports, Jonquière, Quebec, Canada	
20	Loss	17–1–2	Bryant Brannon	UD	12	1995-08-01	Blue Horizon, Philadelphia, Pennsylvania, U.S.	For NABF super middleweight title
19	Win	17–0–2	Undra White	UD	10	1995-06-27	Montreal Forum, Montréal, Quebec, Canada	
18	Win	16–0–2	Charles Oliver	SD	12	1995-02-21	Montreal Forum, Montréal, Quebec, Canada	Retained WBC Continental Americas super middleweight title
17	Win	15–0–2	Mike Belcher	TKO	3 (12)	1994-12-20	Montreal Forum, Montréal, Quebec, Canada	Won WBC Continental Americas super middleweight title
16	Win	14–0–2	Darrell Flint	RTD	7 (12)	1994-11-15	Montreal Forum, Montréal, Quebec, Canada	Retained Canada super middleweight title
15	Win	13–0–2	Laurie Grosse	UD	12	1994-07-13	St-Leonard Arena, Montréal, Quebec, Canada	Retained Canada super middleweight title
14	Win	12–0–2	Steve Surette	TKO	1 (10)	1994-06-07	St-Leonard Arena, Montréal, Quebec, Canada	
13	Win	11–0–2	Terry Collier	UD	10	1994-04-08	Centre Georges-Vézina, Chicoutimi, Quebec, Canada	
12	Win	10–0–2	Guy Stanford	UD	10	1994-02-07	Colisée de Québec, Quebec City, Quebec, Canada	
11	Win	9–0–2	Laurie Grosse	UD	12	1993-11-16	Maurice Richard Arena, Montreal, Quebec, Canada	Won Canada super middleweight title
10	Win	8–0–2	Arthur Willis	UD	10	1993-06-18	Hotel Le Roussillon, Jonquière, Quebec, Canada	
9	Win	7–0–2	Willie Ball	UD	10	1993-03-19	Trois-Rivières, Quebec, Canada	
8	Win	6–0–2	Hughes Daigneault	UD	8	1992-12-08	Montreal Forum, Montréal, Quebec, Canada	
7	Win	5–0–2	June Thomas	MD	8	1992-10-30	Palais de Sports, Sherbrooke, Quebec, Canada	
6	Draw	4–0–2	Hughes Daigneault	PTS	6	1992-05-19	Quebec City, Quebec, Canada	
5	Win	4–0–1	Victor Vargotsky	UD	4	1992-04-22	Spectrum, Montréal, Quebec, Canada	
4	Win	3–0–1	Kevin Watkins	KO	1 (6)	1992-03-30	Delta Hotel, Trois-Rivières, Quebec, Canada	
3	Draw	2–0–1	Gerald Martin	PTS	4	1992-03-06	Villa Roma Resort, Callicoon, New York, U.S.	
2	Win	2–0	Craig Mills	UD	4	1992-02-08	Trump Taj Mahal, Atlantic City, New Jersey, U.S.	
1	Win	1–0	Errol Brown	UD	4	1991-12-17	Hotel Le Roussillon, Jonquière, Quebec, Canada	

== See also ==
- List of world super-middleweight boxing champions

Sporting positions
Regional boxing titles
Preceded by Laurie Grosse	Canadian super middleweight champion 16 November 1993 – 1995; Vacated	Vacant Title next held by Ron Savoie
Vacant Title last held by Drake Thadzi	Canadian light heavyeweight champion 24 March 1997 – 1997; Vacated	Vacant Title next held by Adrian Diaconu
World boxing titles
Vacant Title last held by Dave Hilton Jr.	WBC super middleweight champion 10 July 2001 – 5 April 2003	Succeeded by Markus Beyer
