= Yusaf Mack =

American boxer

Personal information
- Nickname: Mack Attack
- Born: January 20, 1980 (age 46) Philadelphia, Pennsylvania, U.S.
- Height: 6 ft 1 in (185 cm)
- Weight: Middleweight; Super middleweight Light heavyweight

Boxing career
- Reach: 75 in (191 cm)
- Stance: Orthodox

Boxing record
- Total fights: 41
- Wins: 31
- Win by KO: 17
- Losses: 8
- Draws: 2

Yusaf Mack (born January 20, 1980) is an American former professional boxer.

== Professional boxing career ==
On November 17, 2000, in his professional boxing debut, Mack defeated Willie Lee via TKO in the second round.

He has held regional titles from the USBA, NABA, UBA, and NABF. Mack has fought several former world champions, including Alejandro Berrio, Glen Johnson and Carl Froch. Mack is homosexual. He stated he was proud of his sexual orientation in 2015.

== Professional boxing record ==
41 fights	31 wins	8 losses
By knockout	17	5
By decision	14	3
Draws	2	

No.	Result	Record	Opponent	Type	Round, time	Date	Location	Notes
41	Loss	31–8–2	(United States) Cory Cummings	UD	6	Oct 25, 2014	(United States) Schuetzen Park, North Bergen, New Jersey	
40	Loss	31–7–2	(United States) Thomas Williams Jr.	UD	10	Nov 11, 2013	(United States) BB&T Center, Sunrise, Florida	
39	Loss	31–6–2	(United States) Cedric Agnew	UD	12	April 12, 2013	(United States) Four Winds Casino, New Buffalo, Michigan	Lost USBA Light Heavyweight title.
38	Loss	31–5–2	(United Kingdom) Carl Froch	KO	3	Nov 17, 2012	Capital FM Arena, Nottingham, United Kingdom	For IBF Super Middleweight title.
37	Win	31–4–2	(Togo) Sabou Ballogou	UD	6	2012-07-07	(United States) PA Convention Center, Philadelphia	
36	Win	30–4–2	(United States) Omar Sheika	UD	12	2012-04-27	(United States) Resorts Hotel & Casino, Atlantic City, New Jersey	Won USBA light heavyweight title.
35	Loss	29-4–2	(United States) Tavoris Cloud	TKO	8	Jun 25, 2011	(United States) Family Arena, Saint Charles, Missouri	For IBF Light Heavyweight title
34	Win	29–3–2	(United States) Otis Griffin	SD	12	2011-03-04	(United States) Warner Center Marriott, Woodland Hills, California	IBF Light Heavyweight title Eliminator, USBA Light Heavyweight title.
33	Loss	28–3–2	(Jamaica) Glen Johnson	TKO	6	2010-02-05	(United States) NSU Arena, Don Taft University Center, Fort Lauderdale, Florida	IBF Light Heavyweight title Eliminator.
32	Win	28–2–2	(United States) DeAndrey Abron	TKO	4	2009-05-30	(United States) Seminole Hard Rock Hotel and Casino, Hollywood, Florida	
31	Win	27–2–2	(United States) Chris Henry	SD	12	2009-02-06	(United States) Wicomico Civic Center, Salisbury, Maryland	For NABA and NABF light heavyweight titles
30	Win	26–2-2	(United States) Omar Pittman	TKO	6	2008-09-26	(United States) National Guard Armory, Philadelphia	For NABA light heavyweight title and vacant USA Pennsylvania State light heavyweight title
29	Win	25–2-2	(United States) Daniel Judah	UD	10	2008-06-04	(United States) Aviator Sports Complex, Brooklyn, New York	For vacant NABA light heavyweight title
28	Win	24–2-2	(Mexico) Ernesto Zamora	TKO	2	2008-04-11	(United States) The Odeum, Villa Park, Illinois	
27	Loss	23–2-2	(Mexico) Librado Andrade	TKO	7	2007-10-06	(United States) Mandalay Bay Resort & Casino, Las Vegas	For vacant USBA super middleweight title
26	Win	23–1-2	(Puerto Rico) Jose Juan Vasquez	UD	10	2007-06-27	(United States) Cipriani Wall Street, New York City	
25	Loss	22–1-2	(Colombia) Alejandro Berrio	TKO	6	2006-05-19	(United States) Club Cinema, Pompano Beach, Florida	
24	Win	22–0-2	(United States) Tim Shocks	TKO	3	2006-02-11	(United States) First District Plaza, Philadelphia	
23	Win	21–0-2	(United States) Christian Cruz	TKO	6	2005-11-10	(United States) First District Plaza, Philadelphia	
22	Win	20–0-2	(United States) Thomas Reid	UD	10	2005-08-13	(United States) Turning Stone Resort & Casino, Verona, New York	
21	Win	19–0-2	(Jamaica) Richard Grant	UD	12	2005-02-25	(United States) Orleans Arena, Las Vegas	
20	Win	18–0-2	(United States) Shannon Miller	TKO	8	2004-10-08	(United States) The Blue Horizon, Philadelphia	
19	Win	17–0-2	(United States) Donnell Wiggins	KO	2	2004-07-09	(United States) The Tabernacle, Atlanta, United Kingdom	
18	Draw	16–0-2	(United States) Randy Griffin	UD	6	2004-05-20	(United States) Kewadin Casino, Sault Sainte Marie, Michigan	
17	Win	16–0-1	(United States) Ray Berry	UD	6	April 9, 2004	(United States) Drexel National Guard Armory, Philadelphia	
16	Win	15–0-1	(United States) Yusef Robinson	TKO	1	2004-01-16	(United States) Boutwell Auditorium, Birmingham, Alabama	
15	Win	14–0-1	(United States) Darren Whitley	TKO	5	2003-12-05	(United States) The Blue Horizon, Philadelphia	
14	Win	13–0-1	(United States) Sam Reese	UD	8	2003-09-12	(United States) The Blue Horizon, Philadelphia	
13	Win	12–0-1	(United States) Vernon Hines	TKO	2	2003-09-06	(United States) Virginia Showplace, Richmond, Virginia	
12	Win	11–0-1	(Colombia) Juan Carlos Viloria	TKO	4	2003-06-27	(United States) The Blue Horizon, Philadelphia	
11	Win	10–0-1	(United States) Robert Marsh	TKO	1	2003-04-25	(United States) The Blue Horizon, Philadelphia	
10	Win	9–0-1	(United States) Matthew Thompson	UD	6	2003-03-15	(United States) Shuler Gymnasium, Philadelphia	
9	Win	8–0-1	(United States) Robert Marsh	UD	6	2003-02-21	(United States) The Blue Horizon, Philadelphia	
8	Win	7–0-1	(United States) Alex Dill	UD	6	2002-12-06	(United States) The Blue Horizon, Philadelphia	
7	Win	6–0-1	(United States) John McKinney	TKO	4	2002-07-27	(United States) Beau Rivage Resort & Casino, Biloxi, Mississippi	
6	Win	5–0–1	(United States) Morgan Wilson	TKO	1	2002-03-26	(United States) Philadelphia	
5	Win	4–0–1	(Jamaica) Gary Grant	TKO	6	2001-11-03	(United States) Philadelphia	
4	Draw	3–0–1	(Puerto Rico) Jose Aponte	UD	4	2001-10-10	(United States) Lagoon Nightclub, Essington, Pennsylvania	
3	Win	3–0	(United States) Todd Richwine	KO	1	2001-09-25	(United States) Lincoln Hotel, Reading, Pennsylvania	
2	Win	2–0	(United States) Benji Singleton	UD	6	2001-03-29	(United States) Armory, Philadelphia	
1	Win	1–0	(United States) Willie Lee	TKO	2	2000-11-17	(United States) Mississippi Coast Coliseum, Biloxi, Mississippi	Professional debut

== Pornography career ==
In 2015, he appeared in a Dawgpoundusa.com production titled Holiday Hump'n along with gay pornographic actors Bamm Bamm and Young Buck under the name Philly. He initially claimed he had been drugged by the film's producers and had no recollection of making the film, but later told WTXF-TV that he lied to cover that up. In interviews Yusaf Mack states that he is bisexual and is comfortable being intimate with whomever he chooses. Shortly after, Yusaf Mack came out as a gay man. Mack is the father of 10 children and was formerly engaged to a woman.

Yusaf Mack stars in films for the Reality Dudes production company under the stage name Philly Mack.

== See also ==
- Homosexuality in sports
- Homosexuality in sports in the United States
- List of lesbian, gay, bisexual, and transgender sportspeople
- List of bisexual people
- List of male boxers
