= Syd Vanderpool =

Canadian boxer

Personal information
- Nickname: The Jewel
- Nationality: Canadian
- Born: 23 September 1972 (age 53) Kitchener, Ontario
- Height: 5 ft 9 in (1.75 m)
- Weight: Super Middleweight

Boxing career
- Reach: 75 in (190.5 cm)
- Stance: Southpaw

Boxing record
- Total fights: 39
- Wins: 35
- Win by KO: 23
- Losses: 4

Syd Vanderpool (born September 23, 1972) is a professional boxing coach and held the NABO (North American Boxing Organization) (super middleweight) title; he was ranked #1 in the world in 2004 by the International Boxing Federation.

== Career ==
Vanderpool fought world champions Bernard Hopkins and Jeff Lacey, and had a victory over Glen Johnson.

After retiring from competitive boxing in May 2005 with a professional record of 35 wins and 4 losses with 23 ko's, Vanderpool became the CEO of the Boxing By Syd Athletic Centre in Kitchener. The youngest of five brothers, Vanderpool was encouraged by his father, who build a full size boxing ring in their backyard. According to Vanderpool, success is not about how great of a boxer one can be, but is measured by the quality of meaningful relationships acquired while working toward a goal.

== Professional boxing record ==
39 fights	35 wins	4 losses
By knockout	23	3
By decision	12	1

No.	Result	Record	Opponent	Type	Round, time	Date	Location	Notes
39	Loss	35–4	(Colombia) Alejandro Berrio	KO	9 (10), 2:13	22 Apr 2005	(United States) Seminole Hard Rock Hotel and Casino, Hollywood, Florida	
38	Loss	35–3	(United States) Jeff Lacy	TKO	8 (12), 1:37	2 Oct 2004	(United States) Caesars Palace, Las Vegas, Nevada	For vacant IBF Super Middleweight title
37	Win	35–2	(Panama) Tito Mendoza	UD	12	17 Apr 2004	(United States) Florida State Fairgrounds Hall, Tampa, Florida	IBF Super Middleweight Title Eliminator
36	Win	34–2	(United States) Demetrius Jenkins	TKO	9 (10), 3:00	12 Jul 2003	(United States) The Orleans, Las Vegas, Nevada	
35	Win	33–2	(Togo) Jaffa Ballogou	TKO	2 (10), 1:51	14 Dec 2002	(United States) Boardwalk Hall, Atlantic City, New Jersey	
34	Win	32–2	(United States) Tyrus Armstead	TKO	10 (10), 1:02	1 Jun 2002	(United States) Boardwalk Hall, Atlantic City, New Jersey	
33	Win	31–2	(South Africa) Mondli Mbonambi	UD	10	1 Feb 2002	(Canada) Hershey Centre, Mississauga, Ontario	
32	Win	30–2	(United States) Arthur Allen	TKO	5 (10), 2:45	12 Oct 2001	(Canada) Hershey Centre, Mississauga, Ontario	
31	Win	29–2	(United States) Shannon Miller	TKO	5 (8)	17 Aug 2001	(United States) Club International, Detroit	
30	Loss	28–2	(United States) Bernard Hopkins	UD	12	13 May 2000	(United States) Conseco Fieldhouse, Indianapolis, Indiana	For IBF Middleweight title
29	Win	28–1	(Jamaica) Glen Johnson	UD	12	28 Jan 2000	(United States) The Ruins, New Orleans, Louisiana	
