= Julio César González =

Mexican boxer

Personal information
- Born: Julio César González Ibarra; July 30, 1976 Guerrero Negro, Baja California Sur, Mexico
- Died: March 10, 2012 (aged 35) Guerrero Negro, Baja California Sur, Mexico
- Weight: Light heavyweight; Cruiserweight

Boxing career
- Stance: Orthodox

Boxing record
- Total fights: 49
- Wins: 41
- Win by KO: 25
- Losses: 8

Julio César González Ibarra (July 30, 1976 – March 10, 2012) was a Mexican professional boxer who competed from 1997 to 2011, and held the WBO and lineal light-heavyweight titles from 2003 to 2004.

== Amateur career ==
Gonzalez was a member of the 1996 Mexican Olympic team, boxing as a light heavyweight. He was eliminated in the 1st round by eventual gold medalist Vasili Jirov of Kazakhstan.

== Professional career ==
He entered the professional boxing ranks in 1997 after a moderately successful amateur career and gradually worked his way through the ranks of the light heavyweight journeymen. He had won his first 21 fights by the time he got his first chance at a boxing title, the regional WBC Fecarbox belt, on May 5, 2000. He defeated unbeaten fellow Mexican Jesus Ruiz on a ninth round technical knockout in Commerce, California.

Gonzalez followed that victory up with five more wins, including a 12-round unanimous decision over Julian Letterlough on February 2, 2001, that won him the regional NABO light heavyweight title - and propelled him into the No. 1 contender's position in several sanctioning bodies' ratings.

As the top contender, he earned a fight with WBC, WBA (Super), & IBF champion Roy Jones Jr. in July 2001, in Los Angeles. Gonzalez went the distance with Jones, but lost a unanimous decision for his first career setback.

He took seven months off after the loss to Jones before resuming his career and running off seven straight wins without a loss. Most notable in his comeback streak was a 10-round majority decision over former world champion Glen Johnson on January 24, 2003.

=== WBO and lineal light heavyweight champion ===
Gonzalez earned his second shot at a world title on October 18, 2003, when he flew to Hamburg, Germany for a showdown with undefeated Dariusz Michalczewski for the Lineal & WBO light heavyweight championship. Going into the fight, Michalczewski was positioned to tie Rocky Marciano's all-time record of 49 wins and no losses. He also was looking to extend his own world record of 23 straight successful defenses of the light heavyweight title.

In the fight, Gonzalez seemed to take control of the action in the middle rounds, and fought back strongly when Michalczewski, a knockout artist, got him in trouble a few times. When the fight was over, Gonzalez got the verdict on a 12-round split decision; the judge from Germany was the lone dissenter.

Gonzalez lost his title to Zsolt Erdei on January 17, 2004, by unanimous decision.

He challenged Clinton Woods for the IBF light heavyweight title on September 9, 2005, losing by unanimous decision. He met Woods again in a title fight rematch on September 29, 2007. Woods again won the fight by unanimous decision.

In 2008 he was stopped by undefeated prospect Tavoris Cloud.

== Death ==
On March 10, 2012, Gonzalez was killed on impact in a motorcycle accident when he was hit by a drunk driver in B.C. Sur, Mexico. The Julio Gonzalez Memorial Foundation was started in his memory.

== Professional boxing record ==
49 fights	41 wins	8 losses
By knockout	25	1
By decision	16	7

No.	Result	Record	Opponent	Type	Round, time	Date	Location	Notes
49	Loss	41–8	Felipe Romero	UD	12	Sep 30, 2011	Gimnasio Auditorio Jorge Campos, La Paz, Mexico	For vacant WBC FECOMBOX cruiserweight title
48	Loss	41–7	Felipe Romero	UD	12	Aug 7, 2010	Auditorio Alvaro Aguilar, Guerrero Negro, Mexico	For Mexico cruiserweight title
47	Loss	41–6	Tavoris Cloud	TKO	10 (12), 1:50	Aug 8, 2008	Aragon Ballroom, Chicago, Illinois, U.S.	
46	Loss	41–5	Reggie Johnson	SD	12	Feb 23, 2008	Sudduth Coliseum, Lake Charles, Louisiana, U.S.	For vacant IBA light heavyweight title
45	Loss	41–4	Clinton Woods	UD	12	Sep 29, 2007	Hallam FM Arena, Sheffield, England	For IBF light heavyweight title
44	Win	41–3	Vitaly Kopytko	TKO	3 (10), 2:53	Nov 16, 2006	HP Pavilion, San Jose, California, U.S.	
43	Win	40–3	Rodney Moore	KO	3 (8), 2:30	Jul 20, 2006	Tachi Palace Hotel & Casino, Lemoore, California, U.S.	
42	Win	39–3	Jason DeLisle	UD	12	Nov 17, 2005	HP Pavilion, San Jose, California, U.S.	
41	Loss	38–3	Clinton Woods	UD	12	Sep 9, 2005	Hallam FM Arena, Sheffield, England	For IBF light heavyweight title
40	Win	38–2	Montell Griffin	TD	6 (12), 1:11	May 5, 2005	Spa Resort Casino, Palm Springs, California, U.S.	Majority TD after González was cut from an accidental head clash
39	Win	37–2	David Telesco	TKO	8 (10), 1:06	Dec 18, 2004	Staples Center, Los Angeles, California, U.S.	
38	Win	36–2	Orlando Rivera	UD	10	May 21, 2004	Memorial Coliseum, Corpus Christi, Texas, U.S.	
37	Loss	35–2	Zsolt Erdei	UD	12	Jan 17, 2004	Dm-Arena, Karlsruhe, Germany	Lost WBO light heavyweight title
36	Win	35–1	Dariusz Michalczewski	SD	12	Oct 18, 2003	Color Line Arena, Hamburg, Germany	Won WBO light heavyweight title
35	Win	34–1	Manu Ntoh	UD	10	Jun 6, 2003	La Villa Real Convention Center, McAllen, Texas, U.S.	
34	Win	33–1	Kenny Bowman	TKO	3 (10), 2:58	Apr 11, 2003	Sullivan Athletic Center, Chicago, Illinois, U.S.	
33	Win	32–1	Glen Johnson	MD	10	Jan 24, 2003	Crowne Plaza Hotel, Commerce, California, U.S.	
32	Win	31–1	Thomas Reid	TKO	3 (10), 2:53	Oct 12, 2002	Arrowhead Pond, Anaheim, California, U.S.	
31	Win	30–1	Jonathan Young	TKO	9 (10), 3:00	Jun 29, 2002	Arrowhead Pond, Anaheim, California, U.S.	
30	Win	29–1	Joseph Kiwanuka	TKO	7 (10)	Apr 27, 2002	Arrowhead Pond, Anaheim, California, U.S.	
29	Win	28–1	Tyrone Armstead	TKO	2 (10), 3:00	Feb 22, 2002	Palace Indian Gaming Center, Lemoore, California, U.S.	
28	Loss	27–1	Roy Jones Jr.	UD	12	Jul 28, 2001	Staples Center, Los Angeles, California, U.S.	For WBA (Super), WBC, IBF, IBO, vacant WBF (Federation) and IBA light heavyweight titles
27	Win	27–0	Konstantin Semerdjiev	RTD	5 (10), 3:00	Apr 8, 2001	Caesars Tahoe, Stateline, Nevada, U.S.	
26	Win	26–0	Julian Letterlough	UD	12	Feb 2, 2001	Fantasy Springs Resort Casino, Indio, California, U.S.	Retained WBC FECARBOX light heavyweight title; Won WBO–NABO and vacant IBA Continental light heavyweight titles
25	Win	25–0	Jorge Amparo	TKO	5 (8), 1:00	Sep 23, 2000	Convention Center, Ontario, California, U.S.	
24	Win	24–0	Patrick Swann	RTD	4 (12), 3:00	Jul 29, 2000	Caesars Tahoe, Stateline, Nevada, U.S.	Retained WBC FECARBOX light heavyweight title
23	Win	23–0	Tony Menefee	TKO	4 (10), 2:50	Jun 22, 2000	Arrowhead Pond, Anaheim, California, U.S.	
22	Win	22–0	Jesus Ruiz	TKO	9 (12)	May 5, 2000	Arrowhead Pond, Anaheim, California, U.S.	Won vacant WBC FECARBOX light heavyweight title
21	Win	21–0	Dave Boone	KO	5 (10)	Mar 11, 2000	Civic Center, Maywood, California, U.S.	
20	Win	20–0	Gary Campbell	KO	2 (8)	Dec 3, 1999	Pechanga Resert & Casino, Temecula, California, U.S.	
19	Win	19–0	Wilson Smith	TKO	3 (8), 1:59	Oct 4, 1999	Arrowhead Pond, Anaheim, California, U.S.	
18	Win	18–0	Akinobu Yamamura	TKO	3 (8), 1:19	Jul 31, 1999	Rainbow Hall, Nagoya, Japan	
17	Win	17–0	Reggie Roberts	UD	8	Jun 21, 1999	Great Western Forum, Inglewood, California, U.S.	
16	Win	16–0	Francisco Barra	KO	3 (8)	May 14, 1999	Pechanga Resort & Casino, Temecula, California, U.S.	
15	Win	15–0	Paul Jones	KO	2 (6), 0:44	Mar 8, 1999	Arrowhead Pond, Anaheim, California, U.S.	
14	Win	14–0	Gustavo Enriquez	UD	6	Dec 7, 1998	Great Western Forum, Inglewood, California, U.S.	
13	Win	13–0	Charles Davis	MD	6	Sep 26, 1998	Caesars Tahoe, Stateline, Nevada, U.S.	
12	Win	12–0	Derrick Edwards	UD	6	Jul 20, 1998	Great Western Forum, Inglewood, California, U.S.	
11	Win	11–0	Aljenon DeBose	KO	4 (6)	Jul 11, 1998	Long Beach, California, U.S.	
10	Win	10–0	Calvin Combs	TKO	5 (6)	May 28, 1998	Marriott Hotel, Irvine, California, U.S.	
9	Win	9–0	Jude Agu	UD	6	Mar 26, 1998	Marriott Hotel, Irvine, California, U.S.	
8	Win	8–0	Nathaniel Miles	UD	6	Feb 23, 1998	Great Western Forum, Inglewood, California, U.S.	
7	Win	7–0	Zaire Patterson	UD	4	Dec 8, 1997	Great Western Forum, Inglewood, California, U.S.	
6	Win	6–0	James Brock	KO	2 (4)	Sep 29, 1997	Great Western Forum, Inglewood, California, U.S.	
5	Win	5–0	Charles Jefferson	UD	4	Aug 11, 1997	Arrowhead Pond, Anaheim, California, U.S.	
4	Win	4–0	Robert Rios	TKO	1 (4)	Jun 27, 1997	Marriott Hotel, Irvine, California, U.S.	
3	Win	3–0	James Brock	KO	1 (4)	Jun 9, 1997	Arrowhead Pond, Anaheim, California, U.S.	
2	Win	2–0	Alex Federov	TKO	2 (4)	May 30, 1997	Marriott Hotel, Irvine, California, U.S.	
1	Win	1–0	Alex Federov	UD	4	Apr 7, 1997	Arrowhead Pond, Anaheim, California, U.S.	

== See also ==
- List of light heavyweight boxing champions
- List of WBO world champions
- List of Mexican boxing world champions

Sporting positions
Regional boxing titles
Vacant Title last held by Rocky Torres	WBC FECARBOX light heavyweight champion May 5, 2000 – July 28, 2001; Lost bid for world title	Vacant Title next held by Francisco Sierra
Preceded by Julian Letterlough	WBO–NABO light heavyweight champion February 2, 2001 – July 2001; Vacated	Vacant Title next held by Demetrius Jenkins
World boxing titles
Preceded by Dariusz Michalczewski	WBO light heavyweight champion October 18, 2003 – January 17, 2004	Succeeded by Zsolt Erdei
Light heavyweight status
Preceded by Mate Parlov	Latest born world champion to die March 10, 2012 – present	Incumbent
