= Anwar Oshana =

American boxer

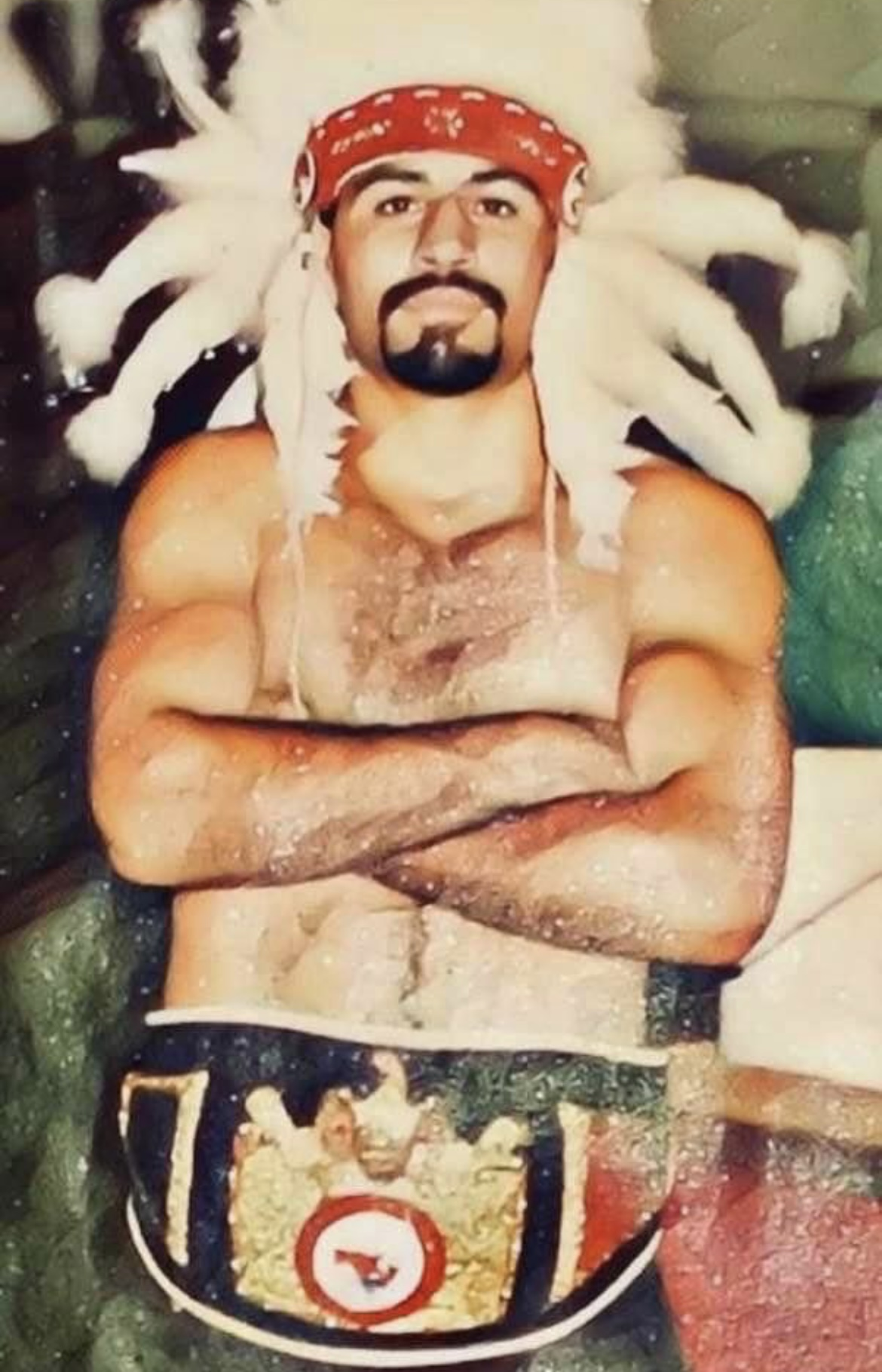

Personal information
- Nationality: (United States) American [Assyrian]
- Born: Anwar Oshana; 11 June 1972 (age 54) Syria
- Height: 5 ft 11 in (180 cm)
- Weight: Super Middleweight

Boxing career
- Reach: 71 in (180 cm)
- Stance: Orthodox

Boxing record
- Total fights: 28
- Wins: 23
- Win by KO: 13
- Losses: 5
- Draws: 0
- No contests: 0

Anwar Oshana (born 11 June 1972) is an Assyrian-American former professional boxer in the super middleweight division between 1994 and 2005. He fought 28 times, winning 23 and losing 5.

== Professional career ==
In 1997, he won the USA Illinois State Super Middleweight title and the IBF Great Lakes Regional Super Middleweight title. After compiling a 20 fight unbeaten run, Oshana suffered a defeat to world rated Thomas Tate. His poor defense let him down at the highest level and he suffered further losses to Omar Shieka, Jeff Lacy and Joe Spina before retiring in 2005.

== Titles in boxing ==
- USA Illinois State Super Middleweight Champion
- IBF Great Lakes Regional Super Middleweight Champion
