= Vitali Tsypko =

Ukrainian boxer

Personal information
- Nationality: (Ukraine) Ukrainian
- Born: Віталій Ципко; 3 June 1976 (age 50) Dnipropetrovsk, Ukrainian SSR, Soviet Union
- Weight: super middleweight

Boxing career
- Stance: southpaw

Boxing record
- Total fights: 27
- Wins: 23
- Win by KO: 13
- Losses: 3
- Draws: 0
- No contests: 1

Vitali Tsypko (born in Dnipropetrovsk, Ukrainian SSR, Soviet Union) is a Ukrainian professional boxer who fights in the super middleweight division.

== Professional boxing record ==
27 fights	23 wins	3 losses
By knockout	13	0
By decision	10	3
No contests	1	

No.	Result	Record	Opponent	Type	Round, time	Date	Location	Notes
27	Loss	23–3 (1)	Librado Andrade	UD	12	4 Apr 2009	Bell Centre, Montreal, Canada	
26	Win	23–2 (1)	Marcin Piatkowski	TKO	3 (8)	17 May 2008	Oberfrankenhalle, Bayreuth, Germany	
25	Win	22–2 (1)	David Gogiya	UD	12	29 Sep 2007	EWE Arena, Oldenburg, Germany	
24	Win	21–2 (1)	Maksym Holovyzyn	RTD	1 (8), 3:00	30 Jun 2007	Olimpiyskiy, Moscow, Russia	
23	Loss	20–2 (1)	Jeff Lacy	MD	10	2 Dec 2006	St. Pete Times Forum, Tampa, Florida, U.S.A	
22	Win	20–1 (1)	Stjepan Božić	TKO	2 (8), 2:13	23 Sep 2006	Rittal Arena, Wetzlar, Germany	
21	Loss	19–1 (1)	Jackson Chanet	UD	12	18 Nov 2005	Chapiteau Espace du Jard, Saint-Dizier, France	Lost European super middleweight title
20	Win	19–0 (1)	Brian Magee	SD	12	16 Jul 2005	Arena Nürnberger Versicherung, Nuremberg, Germany	Won vacant European super middleweight title
19	Win	18–0 (1)	Mukadi Manda	KO	2 (8), 2:57	12 Feb 2004	Max-Schmeling-Halle, Berlin, Germany	
18	Win	17–0 (1)	Lawrence Chapman	UD	12	9 Oct 2004	Messehalle, Erfurt, Germany	Retained WBA Inter-Continental super middleweight title
17	NC	16–0 (1)	Jeff Lacy	NC	2 (12)	5 Jun 2004	Leggett & Platt Center, Joplin, Missouri, U.S.	Tsypko unable to continue after a cut from an accidental head clash
16	Win	16–0	Alexander Zaytsev	UD	12	17 Apr 2004	Max-Schmeling-Halle, Berlin, Germany	Retained WBA Inter-Continental super middleweight title
15	Win	15–0	Charles Adamu	UD	12	28 Feb 2004	Merzhwekhalle, Dresden, Germany	Won vacant WBA Inter-Continental super middleweight title
14	Win	14–0	Francisco Antonio Mora	UD	10	22 Nov 2003	Erdgas Arena, Riesa, Germany	
13	Win	13–0	William Ruiz	KO	1 (8)	6 Sep 2003	Messehalle, Erfurt, Germany	
12	Win	12–0	Thabiso Mogale	KO	4 (8)	11 Apr 2003	K.B. Hallen, Copenhagen, Denmark	
11	Win	11–0	Vincenzo Imparato	KO	7 (12)	16 Nov 2002	Arena Nürnberger Versicherung, Nuremberg, Germany	Won vacant IBF Inter-Continental super middleweight title
10	Win	10–0	Sidney Mxolisi Msutu	TKO	6 (8)	24 Aug 2002	Leipziger Arena, Leipzig, Germany	
9	Win	9–0	Viachaslau Syrovatka	TKO	9 (10)	26 Mar 2002	Donetsk, Ukraine	
8	Win	8–0	Vladimir Panshin	TKO	2 (4)	16 Feb 2002	Zhytomyr, Ukraine	
7	Win	7–0	Oleksiy Hyrshchuk	KO	1 (4)	14 Dec 2001	Circus, Lviv, Ukraine	
6	Win	6–0	Oleksandr Matviichuk	UD	6	20 Nov 2001	Zaporozhye, Ukraine	
5	Win	5–0	Ion Dercacenco	UD	10	9 Sep 2001	Okhtyrka, Ukraine	Won vacant IBF Euro-Asian middleweight title
4	Win	4–0	Aslanbek Kodzoev	TKO	4 (4)	25 Aug 2001	Chernigov, Ukraine	
3	Win	3–0	Elnur Dadashev	PTS	4	6 May 2000	Yalta, Crimea, Ukraine	
2	Win	2–0	Vadym Adrianov	PTS	6	28 Nov 1999	Dnipro, Ukraine	
1	Win	1–0	Anton Karatayev	TKO	3 (4)	16 Oct 1999	Chernigov, Ukraine	
