= Daniel Judah =

American boxer

Personal information
- Nationality: American
- Born: Daniel Harvey Judah; August 8, 1977 (age 49)
- Height: 6 ft 2 in (188 cm)
- Weight: Light heavyweight

Boxing career
- Stance: Southpaw

Boxing record
- Total fights: 38
- Wins: 24
- Win by KO: 11
- Losses: 11
- Draws: 3

Daniel Harvey Judah (born August 8, 1977) is an American former professional boxer. He is the brother of Zab Judah and Josiah Judah, who are also former professional boxers.

== Boxing career ==
Judah had his pro debut on June 18, 1999.

Although Judah has never fought for a major title, he has fought several notable foes, including former Light Heavyweight champ Glen Johnson (boxer) (Draw), Julian Letterlough (Draw), Elvir Muriqi (Decision Loss), Eric Harding (Decision Loss), and Darnell Wilson (TKO loss).

The TKO loss in 2006 to Wilson was his first KO loss, and occurred after a serious injury. According to ringside reports, "just 33 seconds into round four, a right hand from Wilson landed on the shoulder of Judah, and a cracking sound could be heard at ringside. Judah turned away writhing in pain, his shrieks could be heard throughout the ballroom. Referee Malik Waleed, like many in attendance, seemed miffed by the occurrence, he then summoned the ringside physician to inspect the injured fighter. Judah shrieked as soon as his stiffened arm was touched by Doctor Douglass Frankel, M.D."

He was slated to have shoulder surgery in April 2007.

== Family ==
Judah's father is an avowed Black Hebrew Israelite, though Judah's family have declared themselves "Jews". Judah's brother Zab has been referred to in the press as "the best Jewish fighter of all time."

== Professional boxing record ==
38 fights	24 wins	11 losses
By knockout	11	5
By decision	13	6
Draws	3	

No.	Result	Record	Opponent	Type	Round, time	Date	Location	Notes
38	Loss	24–11–3	(China) Fanlong Meng	KO	5 (8), 2:08	2016-07-22	(United States) Claridge Hotel & Casino, Atlantic City, New Jersey, USA	
37	Win	24–10–3	(United States) Jose Brewer	TKO	1 (4), 2:47	2016-02-06	(United States) United Wireless Arena, Dodge City, Kansas, USA	
36	Loss	23–10–3	(United States) Dennis Hasson	UD	8	2012-08-31	(United States) Dover Downs Hotel & Casino, Dover, Delaware, USA	
35	Loss	23–9–3	(United States) Cedric Agnew	KO	6 (12), 2:45	2011-11-03	(United States) Dallas Petroleum Club, Dallas, Texas, USA	For vacant WBC United States (USNBC) Light heavyweight title.
34	Loss	23–8–3	(United States) Rayco Saunders	UD	10	2011-07-28	(United States) Carsons Live, Pittsburgh, Pennsylvania, USA	
33	Loss	23–7–3	(Albania) Elvir Muriqi	UD	10	2010-11-20	(United States) Aviator Sports Complex, Brooklyn, New York, USA	
32	Loss	23–6–3	(United States) Adam Seal	TKO	5 (10), 2:40	2010-05-28	(United States) Scope Arena, Norfolk, Virginia, USA	
31	Loss	23–5–3	(Ukraine) Ismail Sillakh	TKO	2 (10), 0:49	2010-04-03	(United States) Mandalay Bay Resort & Casino, Las Vegas, Nevada, USA	For vacant NABF Light heavyweight title.
30	Loss	23–4–3	(Jamaica) Glen Johnson	UD	10	2009-02-27	(United States) Seminole Hard Rock Hotel & Casino, Hollywood, Florida, USA	
29	Win	23–3–3	(Togo) Jaffa Ballogou	UD	12	2008-12-04	(United States) Roseland Ballroom, New York City, New York, USA	Won vacant IBF International Light heavyweight title.
28	Loss	22–3–3	(United States) Yusaf Mack	UD	10	2008-06-04	(United States) Aviator Sports Complex, Brooklyn, New York, USA	For vacant NABA Light heavyweight title.
27	Win	22–2–3	(United States) Charles Davis	SD	6	2007-09-01	(United States) Fitzgeralds Casino & Hotel Tunica, Tunica, Mississippi, USA	
26	Loss	21–2–3	(United States) Darnell Wilson	TKO	4 (10), 0:33	2006-09-28	(United States) Michael's Eighth Avenue, Glen Burnie, Maryland, USA	
25	Win	21–1–3	(United States) Dennis McKinney	UD	8	2006-03-31	(United States) Community Center, Port Saint Lucie, Florida, USA	
24	Loss	20–1–3	(United States) Eric Harding	UD	12	2005-10-21	(United States) Mohegan Sun Casino, Uncasville, Connecticut, USA	For vacant NABF Light heavyweight title.
23	Win	20–0–3	(Germany) Ray Berry	TKO	6 (10)	2004-10-28	(United States) Seminole Hard Rock Hotel & Casino, Hollywood, Florida, USA	
22	Draw	19–0–3	(United States) Julian Letterlough	PTS	12	2004-04-17	(United States) Florida State Fairgrounds Hall, Tampa, Florida, USA	For vacant USA Light heavyweight title.
21	Win	19–0–2	(United States) Tiwon Taylor	TKO	5 (10), 1:36	2004-01-17	(United States) Seminole Casino, Coconut Creek, Florida, USA	
20	Win	18–0–2	(United States) Shannon Miller	TKO	1 (6)	2003-10-24	(United States) Jimmy's Bronx Cafe, Bronx, New York, USA	
19	Draw	17–0–2	(Jamaica) Glen Johnson	SD	10	2003-04-04	(United States) Mohegan Sun Casino, Uncasville, Connecticut, USA	
18	Win	17–0–1	(United States) Craig Salamone	UD	10	2002-12-11	(United States) Hudson Theatre, New York City, New York, USA	Won vacant USA New York State Cruiserweight title.
17	Win	16–0–1	(Colombia) Juan Carlos Viloria	UD	6	2002-09-27	(United States) Harriet Himmel Theatre, West Palm Beach, Florida, USA	
16	Win	15–0–1	(United States) Kerry Parks	UD	8	2002-07-13	(United States) Sam's Town Casino, Tunica, Mississippi, USA	
15	Win	14–0–1	(United States) Robert Davis	UD	8	2002-02-16	(United States) Mohegan Sun Casino, Uncasville, Connecticut, USA	
14	Win	13–0–1	(United States) Tim Dendy	PTS	8	2001-10-02	(United States) Memphis, Tennessee, USA	
13	Win	12–0–1	(United States) Mike Alvarez	TKO	3 (6), 2:09	2001-08-18	(United States) Mohegan Sun Casino, Uncasville, Connecticut, USA	
12	Win	11–0–1	(United States) Dan Sheehan	UD	6	2001-06-23	(United States) Mohegan Sun Casino, Uncasville, Connecticut, USA	
11	Win	10–0–1	(United States) Donny Giron	TKO	4 (6), 3:00	2001-05-19	(United States) Mohegan Sun Casino, Uncasville, Connecticut, USA	
10	Win	9–0–1	(United States) Steve Detar	TKO	3 (6), 1:52	2001-01-13	(United States) Mohegan Sun Casino, Uncasville, Connecticut, USA	
9	Win	8–0–1	(United States) Eric Howard	UD	4	2000-12-01	(United States) MGM Grand Garden Arena, Las Vegas, Nevada, USA	
8	Win	7–0–1	(United States) Eric Starr	TKO	5 (6)	2000-10-06	(United States) Ballys Park Place Hotel Casino, Atlantic City, New Jersey, USA	
7	Win	6–0–1	(United States) Jason Dietrich	UD	4	2000-08-26	(United States) Mandalay Bay Resort & Casino, Las Vegas, Nevada, USA	
6	Win	5–0–1	(United States) Eric Brown	TKO	2 (6), 1:49	2000-08-05	(United States) Mohegan Sun Casino, Uncasville, Connecticut, USA	
5	Win	4–0–1	(Germany) Predrag Cvetanovic	TKO	1 (4)	2000-04-29	(United States) Madison Square Garden, New York City, New York, USA	
4	Win	3–0–1	(United States) Kevin Russell	UD	4	2000-02-12	(United States) Mohegan Sun Casino, Uncasville, Connecticut, USA	
3	Draw	2–0–1	(United States) Keith Jarrett	PTS	4	2000-02-01	(United States) Charlotte Co Auditorium, Punta Gorda, Florida, USA	
2	Win	2–0	(United States) Adrian Miller	KO	1 (4)	1999-12-04	(United States) Augusta, Georgia, USA	
1	Win	1–0	(United States) David McCluskey	UD	4	1999-06-18	(United States) National Guard Armory, West Palm Beach, Florida, USA	Professional debut.
