= Julian Letterlough =

American boxer

Julian Letterlough (December 25, 1969 – July 8, 2005) was an American professional boxer from Harrisburg, Pennsylvania. Known as "Mr. KO", Letterlough was boxer who was often featured on ESPN.

== Pro career ==
Letterlough became a professional boxer in 1998 at the late age of 28 after a seven-year stint in prison for assault. He fought as a light heavyweight and was unbeaten in his first 16 fights.

He fought against Julio César González in 2001, a fight in which González was down three times, and Letterlough down twice. González won by decision. Later that year, he got a shot at International Boxing Federation cruiserweight titleholder Vassiliy Jirov, but lost in the 8th round by TKO. He lost a decision later that year to David Telesco, and in 2003 was knocked out by Richard Hall. In 2004 he fought a draw against Daniel Judah, a fight in which Judah went down in round five and was docked a point for holding in round seven.

== Professional boxing record ==
21 Wins (20 knockouts, 1 decision), 5 Losses (2 knockouts, 3 decisions), 3 Draws
Result	Record	Opponent	Type	Round	Date	Location	Notes
Win	13-17-2	(United States) Eric Starr	TKO	2	01/10/2004	(United States) Reading, Pennsylvania, U.S.	Referee stopped the bout at 2:42 of the second round.
Draw	19-0-2	(United States) Daniel Judah	PTS	12	17/04/2004	(United States) Tampa, Florida, U.S.	USBA Light Heavyweight Title.
Win	77-17-1	(United States) Tony Menefee	TKO	5	23/01/2004	(United States) Atlantic City, New Jersey, U.S.	Referee stopped the bout at 2:45 of the fifth round.
Loss	10-7	(Colombia) Faustino González	MD	6	29/08/2003	(United States) Reading, Pennsylvania, U.S.	
Loss	25-4	(Jamaica) Richard Hall	TKO	2	18/07/2003	(United States) Hyannis, Massachusetts, U.S.	
Win	32-30-2	(United States) Stacy Goodson	TKO	1	27/03/2003	(United States) Fort Lauderdale, Florida, U.S.	Referee stopped the bout at 1:23 of the first round.
Draw	2-8-2	(Guyana) John Douglas	PTS	6	15/11/2002	(United States) Dorchester, Massachusetts, U.S.	
Win	20-8	(Jamaica) Lloyd Bryan	TKO	4	22/06/2002	(United States) Reading, Pennsylvania, U.S.	
Loss	25-3	(United States) David Telesco	UD	10	18/01/2002	(United States) Raleigh, North Carolina, U.S.	
Loss	29-0	(Kazakhstan) Vassiliy Jirov	TKO	8	08/09/2001	(United States) Reno, Nevada, U.S.	IBF Cruiserweight Title. Referee stopped the bout at 1:24 of the eighth round.
Win	24-4	(United States) Ka-Dy King	KO	2	22/06/2001	(United States) Harrisburg, Pennsylvania, U.S.	King knocked out at 1:34 of the second round.
Win	11-18-1	(United States) Dennis McKinney	UD	6	08/04/2001	(United States) Reading, Pennsylvania, U.S.	
Loss	25-0	(Mexico) Julio César González	UD	12	02/02/2001	(United States) Columbus, Ohio, U.S.	WBO–NABO and FECARBOX Light Heavyweight Titles.
Win	11-2-3	(United States) Max Heyman	TKO	5	17/11/2000	(United States) Stateline, Nevada, U.S.	WBO–NABO Light Heavyweight Title. Referee stopped the bout at 1:25 of the fifth round.
Draw	15-0-2	(United States) Sam Ahmad	PTS	10	22/09/2000	(United States) Philadelphia, Pennsylvania, U.S.	
Win	18-4	(United States) Demetrius Jenkins	TKO	7	14/07/2000	(United States) Hampton Beach, New Hampshire, U.S.	Referee stopped the bout at 1:58 of the seventh round.
Win	8-0	(United States) Manny Rose	TKO	1	09/06/2000	(United States) Harrisburg, Pennsylvania, U.S.	Pennsylvania Light Heavyweight Title.
Win	13-6-2	(United States) Troy Weaver	TKO	1	09/04/2000	(United States) Stateline, Nevada, U.S.	WBO–NABO Light Heavyweight Title. Referee stopped the bout at 0:42 of the first round.
Win	17-19-2	(United States) Vinson Durham	KO	2	11/02/2000	(United States) Reading, Pennsylvania, U.S.	
Win	11-7	(United States) Darryl Hollowell	KO	6	18/11/1999	(United States) Glen Burnie, Maryland, U.S.	Hollowell knocked out at 2:55 of the sixth round.
Win	15-27-2	(United States) Eric Davis	KO	3	29/10/1999	(United States) Philadelphia, Pennsylvania, U.S.	
Win	14-11-1	(United States) Napoleon Pitt	TKO	3	25/09/1999	(United States) Harrisburg, Pennsylvania, U.S.	
Win	2-6-2	(United States) Charles Lee	TKO	5	18/06/1999	(United States) Harrisburg, Pennsylvania, U.S.	
Win	3-8	(United States) Felton Hamilton	KO	5	09/04/1999	(United States) Waldorf, Maryland, U.S.	Hamilton knocked out at 0:22 of the fifth round.
Win	6-0	(United States) Dana Rucker	KO	3	25/03/1999	(United States) Glen Burnie, Maryland, U.S.	Rucker knocked out at 0:16 of the third round.
Win	6-4	(United States) Ricardo Dabney	KO	1	29/01/1999	(United States) Atlantic City, New Jersey, U.S.	
Win	1-0	(United States) Ted Megginson	KO	1	16/12/1998	(United States) Glenarden, Maryland, U.S.	Megginson knocked out at 0:36 of the first round.
Win	2-3-2	(United States) Cleveland Issacs	TKO	3	03/12/1998	(United States) Allentown, Pennsylvania, U.S.	
Win	1-5-1	(United States) Byron Jones	TKO	2	23/10/1998	(United States) Reading, Pennsylvania, U.S.	

== Murder ==
Letterlough was shot in the back and killed while leaving a bar with his wife in Reading, Pennsylvania, on July 8, 2005.
