= The Blue Horizon =

Boxing venue in Pennsylvania

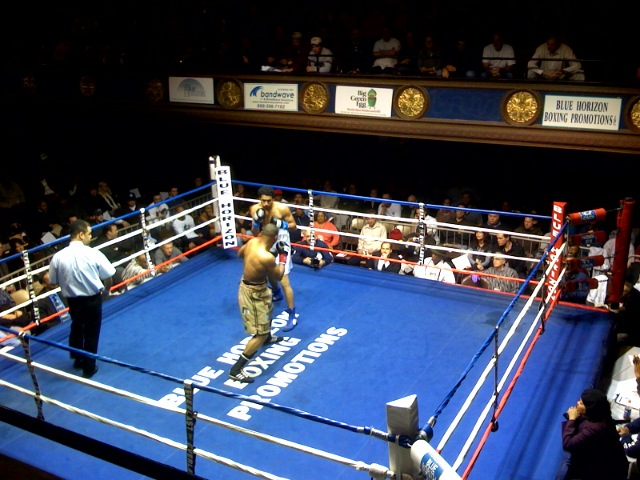
- The Blue Horizon
- Interactive map of The Blue Horizon
- Address: 1314 N. Broad Street
- Location: Philadelphia, Pennsylvania
- Coordinates: 39.9739°N 75.1594°W
- Capacity: 1,346

Construction
- Opened: November 3, 1961
- Closed: June 2010

The Blue Horizon is a historic 1,346-seat former boxing venue in Philadelphia. The Ring magazine voted it the number-one boxing venue in the world, and Sports Illustrated noted it as the last great boxing venue in the country.

The Blue Horizon was originally constructed as three four-story Second Empire style houses in 1865. Originally built to house the nouveau riche, the properties were eventually sold to the Loyal Order of Moose. Architect Carl Berger oversaw the 1914 alterations to house the fraternal lodge, adding a ballroom, bar, and auditorium. Lodge #54, located at 1312-1316 North Broad Street had over 20,000 members by 1920, at that point the highest membership of any fraternal lodge in the world. By the late 1920s, membership had reached over 40,000 and plans were made for an extensive expansion of the building; however, the Great Depression forced Lodge #54 to abandon their plans. The building also got its first taste of professional boxing during the Moose era, with two fight cards on March 1 and 28, 1938. The March 28 card featured heavyweight Willie Reddish, who later trained Sonny Liston and Joe Frazier.

Jimmy Toppi Sr. purchased the building in 1961 for $85,000, and renamed it after the song "Beyond the Blue Horizon" from the 1930 film Monte Carlo. After another series of renovations, regular boxing shows began in the Blue Horizon on November 3, 1961. The main event featured Hall of Famer George Benton against Chico Corsey, a late substitute. The early days of the building as a boxing venue saw regular weekly shows. Promoter Marty Kramer was given a grant from Madison Square Garden to put on these matches in order to develop young fighters. Kramer promoted over 30 main events before leaving the Blue Horizon in 1963. Promoter Herman Taylor then hosted three nationally televised bouts at the venue in 1963 and 1964, featuring Jose Stable, Dick Turner, Harold Johnson, Henry Hank, Stanley Hayward, and Curtis Cokes. On May 26, 1966, Gypsy Joe Harris took a 10-round decision over Johnny Knight in a fight promoted by Lou Lucchese. There would be no more fights until September 30, 1969, when J. Russell Peltz had his first promotion of his Hall-of-Fame career. Peltz set a then-site attendance record of 1,606 in his first of many cards at the Blue Horizon.

Peltz would leave the Blue in 1971 after 31 cards to promote at bigger venues like the Arena and the Spectrum, but would return in 1974. Peltz would promote more fights at the Blue Horizon than anyone else in its history. The Peltz era brought Philadelphia greats such as Matthew Saad Muhammad, Bernard Hopkins, Cyclone Hart, Tim Witherspoon, Willie Monroe, Boogaloo Watts, Sammy Goss, Jeff Chandler and Bennie Briscoe. Peltz left the Blue Horizon in 2001, came back to promote one card in 2004 and three cards in 2009 for the last time.

In 1994, the site was purchased by Vernoca L. Michael, Carol P. Ray, and Carol M.A. Whitaker. In 1998, Vernoca Michael became licensed as the first female African American boxing promoter in the state of Pennsylvania. She has promoted bouts since featuring established fighters such as Eddie Chambers, Yusef Mack, and Lajuan Simon.

On December 2, 1997, the venue held its first world title fight when Peltz promoted Charles Brewer in a defense of his International Boxing Federation super middleweight crown. The Blue Horizon has also hosted international, regional and state title fights.

In 2008, Ms. Michael was named one of Top 50 Women in Business in the State of Pennsylvania by Governor Ed Rendell. Michael has worked to make the building a cultural center for the surrounding neighborhood by creating a learning center with connections to Temple University and the University of Pennsylvania and a Philadelphia Boxing Museum. The venue also hosts special events, meetings, receptions, weddings, and cabarets.

The Blue Horizon appears in the film Rocky V as some fight scenes involving Tommy Morrison's character "Tommy Gunn" were filmed there. The building was also used to film the boxing scenes in the movie Annapolis.

The Blue Horizon was closed, reportedly due to tax problems, in June 2010. In January 2011, it was announced that $6 million had been granted to help West Philadelphia developer Mosaic Development Partners build an $18 million hotel-and-restaurant complex with a jazz bar and fitness center at the site of the Blue Horizon. In July 2013, Mosaic's plans called for the venue to be demolished in order to make way for a parking garage. As of October 2023, construction on the hotel project had still not begun, though Mosaic's website still lists plans for a "Hotel Moxy at the Blue Horizon" which would maintain none of the original interior features of the arena.
