= Boxing at the 1992 Summer Olympics – Light middleweight =

Light middleweight boxing at the Games of the XXV Olympiad
- Venue: Pavelló Club Joventut Badalona
- Dates: 27 July – 9 August 1992
- Competitors: 30 from 30 nations

Medalists
1st place, gold medalist(s)		Juan Carlos Lemus	Cuba
2nd place, silver medalist(s)		Orhan Delibaş	Netherlands
3rd place, bronze medalist(s)		György Mizsei	Hungary
3rd place, bronze medalist(s)		Robin Reid	Great Britain

The men's light middleweight event was part of the boxing programme at the 1992 Summer Olympics. The weight class allowed boxers of up to 71 kilograms to compete. The competition was held from 27 July to 9 August 1992. 30 boxers from 30 nations competed.

== Medalists ==
Gold	Juan Carlos Lemus; Cuba
Silver	Orhan Delibaş; Netherlands
Bronze	György Mizsei; Hungary
Bronze	Robin Reid; Great Britain

== Results ==
The following boxers took part in the event:

Rank	Name	Country
1	Juan Carlos Lemus	Cuba
2	Orhan Delibaş	Netherlands
3T	György Mizsei	Hungary
3T	Robin Reid	Great Britain
5T	Igors Šaplavskis	Latvia
5T	Maselino Masoe	American Samoa
5T	Raul Marquez	United States
5T	Ole Klemetsen	Norway
9T	Joseph Marwa	Tanzania
9T	Markus Beyer	Germany
9T	Hendrik Simangunsong	Indonesia
9T	Furas Hashim	Iraq
9T	Rival Cadeau	Seychelles
9T	Chalit Boonsingkarn	Thailand
9T	Noureddine Meziane	Algeria
9T	Leonidas Maleckis	Lithuania
17T	Arkady Topayev	Unified Team
17T	Joe Figota	New Zealand
17T	Ray Downey	Canada
17T	Fabrizio De Chiara	Italy
17T	Hiroshi Nagashima	Japan
17T	Miguel Jiménez	Puerto Rico
17T	David Defiagbon	Nigeria
17T	Mohamed Mesbahi	Morocco
17T	Choi Gi-su	South Korea
17T	Lucas França	Brazil
17T	Jorge Porley	Uruguay
17T	Abrar Hussain Syed	Pakistan
17T	Kabary Salem	Egypt
17T	Marcus Thomas	Barbados

=== First round ===
- Igors Šaplavskis (LAT) – BYE
- Joseph Marwa (TAN) – BYE
- Juan Carlos Lemus (CUB) def. Arkadiy Topayev (EUN), 11:0
- Markus Beyer (GER) def. Sililo Figota (NZL), 16:2
- Hendrik Simangunsong (INA) def. Raymond Downey (CAN), 12:5
- György Mizsei (HUN) def. Fabrizio de Chiara (ITA), 13:4
- Maselino Masoe (ASA) def. Hiroshi Nagashima (JPN) RSCI-3 (00:54)
- Furas Hashim (IRQ) def. Miguel Jiménez (PUR), 10:3
- Raúl Márquez (USA) def. David Defiagbon (NGR), 8:7
- Rival Cadeau (SEY) def. Mohamed Mesbahi (MAR), 5:3
- Orhan Delibaş (NED) def. Choi Ki-Soo (KOR), 3:0
- Chalit Boonsingkarn (THA) def. Lucas Franca (BRA), 16:2
- Ole Klemetsen (NOR) def. Jorge Porley (URU), RSCH-1 (02:38)
- Noureddine Meziane (ALG) def. Syed Abrar Hussain (PAK), 7:0
- Leonidas Maleckis (LTU) def. Kabary Salem (EGY), 13:6
- Robin Reid (GBR) def. Marcus Thomas (BAR), KO-1 (00:58)

=== Second round ===
- Igors Šaplavskis (LAT) def. Joseph Marwa (TAN), 14:8
- Juan Carlos Lemus (CUB) def. Markus Beyer (GER), RSCH-1 (02:55)
- György Mizsei (HUN) def. Hendrik Simangunsong (INA), 17:5
- Maselino Masoe (ASA) def. Furas Hashim (IRQ), RSCH-1 (00:44)
- Raúl Márquez (USA) def. Rival Cadeau (SEY), 20:3
- Orhan Delibaş (NED) def. Chalit Boonsingkarn (THA), RSCI-2 (01:45)
- Ole Klemetsen (NOR) def. Noureddine Meziane (ALG), 14:3
- Robin Reid (GBR) def. Leonidas Maleckis (LTU), 10:3

=== Quarterfinals ===
- Juan Carlos Lemus (CUB) def. Igors Šaplavskis (LAT), 12:2
- György Mizsei (HUN) def. Maselino Masoe (ASA), 17:3
- Orhan Delibaş (NED) def. Raúl Márquez (USA), 16:12
- Robin Reid (GBR) def. Ole Klemetsen (NOR), 20:10

=== Semifinals ===
- Juan Carlos Lemus (CUB) def. György Mizsei (HUN), 10:2
- Orhan Delibaş (NED) def. Robin Reid (GBR), 8:3

=== Final ===
- Juan Carlos Lemus (CUB) def. Orhan Delibaş (NED), 6:1
