= Boxing at the 1988 Summer Olympics – Light middleweight =

Olympic boxing tournament

Light middleweight boxing at the Games of the XXIV Olympiad
- Venue: Jamsil Students' Gymnasium
- Dates: 20 September – 2 October 1988
- Competitors: 36 from 36 nations

Medalists
1st place, gold medalist(s)		Park Si-hun	South Korea
2nd place, silver medalist(s)		Roy Jones Jr.	United States
3rd place, bronze medalist(s)		Raymond Downey	Canada
3rd place, bronze medalist(s)		Richard Woodhall	Great Britain

The men's light middleweight event was part of the boxing programme at the 1988 Summer Olympics. The weight class allowed boxers of up to 71 kilograms to compete. The competition was held from 20 September to 2 October 1988. 36 boxers from 36 nations competed.

19-year-old Roy Jones Jr. of the U.S. dominated his opponents, never losing a single round en route to the final. In the final, he controversially lost a 3–2 decision to 23-year-old South Korean fighter Park Si-Hun, four years his senior, despite pummeling Park for three rounds and landing 86 punches to Park's 32.

== Medalists ==
Gold	Park Si-hun; South Korea
Silver	Roy Jones Jr. United States
Bronze	Raymond Downey; Canada
Bronze	Richard Woodhall; Great Britain

== Results ==
The following boxers took part in the event:

Rank	Name	Country
1	Park Si-hun	South Korea
2	Roy Jones Jr.	United States
3T	Raymond Downey	Canada
3T	Richard Woodhall	Great Britain
5T	Rey Rivera	Puerto Rico
5T	Yevgeny Zaytsev	Soviet Union
5T	Vincenzo Nardiello	Italy
5T	Martin Kitel	Sweden
9T	Peter Silva	Brazil
9T	Apolinário de Silveira	Angola
9T	Michal Franek	Czechoslovakia
9T	Sounaila Sagnon	Burkina Faso
9T	Torsten Schmitz	East Germany
9T	Quinn Paynter	Bermuda
9T	Laurensio Mercado	Ecuador
9T	Abrar Hussain Syed	Pakistan
17T	Charles Mahlalela	Swaziland
17T	George Allison	Guyana
17T	Desmond Williams	Sierra Leone
17T	Mohamad Orungi	Kenya
17T	M'tendere Makalamba	Malawi
17T	Gary Smikle	Jamaica
17T	John Boscoe Waigo	Uganda
17T	Abdullah Ramadan	Sudan
17T	Angel Stoyanov	Bulgaria
17T	Johnny de Lima	Denmark
17T	Likou Aliu	Western Samoa
17T	Ncholu Monontsi	Lesotho
17T	Wabanko Banko	Zaire
17T	Norbert Nieroba	West Germany
17T	François Mayo	Cameroon
32T	Emmanuel Quaye	Ghana
32T	Jorge Oscar López	Argentina
32T	Garth Felix	Grenada
32T	Noureddine Meziane	Algeria
32T	Moussa Wiawindi	Central African Republic

=== First round ===
- Segundo Mercado (ECU) def. Kofi Emmanuel Quaye (GHA), KO-3
- Raymond Downey (CAN) def. Jorge Oscar López (ARG), 5:0
- Norbert Nieroba (FRG) def. Garth Felix (GRN), KO-1
- Abrar Hussain (PAK) def. Noureddine Meziane (ALG), KO-2
- François Mayo (CMR) def. Moussa Wiawindi (RCA), RSC-1

=== Second round ===
- Peter Silva (BRA) def. Charles Mahlalela (SWZ), 5:0
- Rey Rivera (PUR) def. George Allison (GUY), 5:0
- Richard Woodhall (GBR) def. Desmond Williams (SLE), 5:0
- Apolinario Silveira (ANG) def. Mohamed Orungi (KEN), RSC-2
- Michal Franek (TCH) def. Isaack Impatu (VAN), walk-over
- Roy Jones Jr. (USA) def. M'tendere Makalamba (MLW), KO-1
- Yevgeni Zaytsev (URS) def. Gary Smikle (JAM), 5:0
- Sounaila Sagnon (BUR) def. John Boscoe Waigo (UGA), RSC-1
- Park Si-Hun (KOR) def. Abdullah Ramadan (SUD), RSC-2
- Torsten Schmitz (GDR) def. Angel Stoyanov (BUL), 3:2
- Quinn Paynter (BER) def. Johnny de Lima (DEN), RSC-3
- Vincenzo Nardiello (ITA) def. Likou Aliu (SAM), KO-3
- Martin Kitel (SWE) def. Ncholu Monontsi (LES), 5:0
- Segundo Mercado (ECU) def. Vaban Banko (ZAI), 5:0
- Raymond Downey (CAN) def. Norbert Nieroba (FRG), 3:2
- Abrar Hussain (PAK) def. François Mayo (CMR), RSC-2

=== Third round ===
- Rey Rivera (PUR) def. Peter Silva (BRA), KO-1
- Richard Woodhall (GBR) def. Apolinario Silveira (ANG), 5:0
- Roy Jones Jr. (USA) def. Michal Franek (TCH), 5:0
- Yevgeni Zaytsev (URS) def. Sounaila Sagnon (BUR), RSC-2
- Park Si-Hun (KOR) def. Torsten Schmitz (GDR), 5:0
- Vincenzo Nardiello (ITA) def. Quinn Paynter (BER), KO-2
- Martin Kitel (SWE) def. Segundo Mercado (ECU), 3:2
- Raymond Downey (CAN) def. Abrar Hussain (PAK), 5:0

=== Quarterfinals ===
- Richard Woodhall (GBR) def. Rey Rivera (PUR), 5:0
- Roy Jones Jr. (USA) def. Yevgeni Zaytsev (URS), 5:0
- Park Si-Hun (KOR) def. Vincenzo Nardiello (ITA), 3:2
- Raymond Downey (CAN) def. Martin Kitel (SWE), 5:0

=== Semifinals ===
- Roy Jones Jr. (USA) def. Richard Woodhall (GBR), 5:0
- Park Si-Hun (KOR) def. Raymond Downey (CAN), 5:0

=== Final ===
- Park Si-Hun (KOR) def. Roy Jones Jr. (USA), 3:2

Judges Zaur Gvadzhava of the Soviet Union and Sándor Pajar of Hungary each voted for Jones, 60–56, on the 20-point must system. Alberto Duran of Uruguay and Hiouad Larbi of Morocco voted for Park, each by 59–58. Bob D. Kasule of Uganda gave 59–59 a draw, but decided that Park was more aggressive. As the decision was highly controversial, it eventually led the Olympic authorities to introduce a new high-tech scoring system, which in turn was intended to eliminate biased judging.
