= Ray Downey =

Canadian boxer (born 1968)

Personal information
- Nickname: Sugar Ray
- Nationality: (Canada) Canadian
- Born: Raymond Tyler Downey; September 23, 1968 (age 57) Halifax, Nova Scotia, Canada
- Height: 5 ft 9½ in (177 cm)
- Weight: Light middleweight

Boxing career

Boxing record
- Total fights: 19
- Wins: 16
- Win by KO: 8
- Losses: 2
- Draws: 1
Medal record
Men's amateur boxing
Representing Canada
Olympic Games
Bronze medal – third place	1988 Seoul	Light Middleweight
Commonwealth Games
Silver medal – second place	1990 Auckland	Light Middleweight

Raymond Tyler Downey (born September 23, 1968 in Halifax, Nova Scotia) is a Canadian former boxer who won a light middleweight bronze medal at the 1988 Summer Olympics. In 1990, he won silver at the 1990 Commonwealth Games. He is a member of Nova Scotia's "Boxing Downeys" family of fighters. His father was boxer David Downey.

== Early life ==
Raymond Downey, born in the late 1960s, grew up in North End, Halifax.

Downey began boxing at nine years old. He trained under Taylor Gordon, then Canadian national coach, at the Citadel Boxing Club from a young age.

== Amateur boxing career ==
In the early 1980s, his success included medals from local exhibitions, international tournaments, and junior amateur championships. He won gold at the Canadian junior amateur boxing championships in May 1983, and a silver medal in the following year at the competition.

His first international appearance came at the 1983 World Junior Boxing Championships, where he finished fourth in the light-middleweight category.

Downey, at 17, won gold medals in 1986 tournaments in Italy and Yugoslavia. He became the Canadian intermediate champion after securing a win over the Commonwealth and senior champion in December 1986.

At the February 1987 Canada Winter Games in Sydney, Nova Scotia, Downey won gold and served as flag bearer for his province.

In March 1987, his first year as a senior, he competed at the Canadian Senior Amateur Boxing Championships in Oromocto in the 71-kilogram light-middleweight division. By winning, he became national champion and earned selection to Canada's boxing team.

Ray Downey was a bronze medalist in the light middleweight classification for Canada at the 1988 Summer Olympics in Seoul, South Korea.

=== 1988 Seoul Olympics results ===
  - Round of 64: Defeated Jorge López (Argentina) by decision, 5-0
  - Round of 32: Defeated Norbert Nieroba (West Germany) by decision, 3-2
  - Round of 16: Defeated Abrar Hussain Syed (Pakistan) by decision, 5-0
  - Quarterfinal: Defeated Martin Kitel (Sweden) by decision, 5-0
  - Semifinal: Lost to Park Si-hun (South Korea) by decision, 0-5 (was awarded bronze medal)

That year, the Olympic bronze medalist was awarded the Viscount Alexander Award at the Canadian Sports Awards for the "Outstanding junior male athlete of the year."

At the inaugural Canada Cup international boxing tournament in Ottawa in June 1988, he claimed the bronze medal. He reached the finals of the second annual Canada Cup in Ottawa in June 1989, defeating Wilson Santana of the Dominican Republic in the third round to claim gold.

He advanced to the finals of the Canadian National Championships in Hamilton, Ontario in November 1989. Downey maintained his hold on the Canadian title with a successful defense that year.

At the 1989 World Amateur Boxing Championships in Moscow and the 1990 Goodwill Games in Seattle, he lost to the eventual gold medalists, then went on to compete in the finals at the 1990 Commonwealth Games in Auckland. He captured a silver medal at the fourteenth Commonwealth Games, losing to England's Richie Woodhall.

Competing at the Canada Cup in Ottawa in June 1990, he secured silver.

In November 1990, he represented at the Boxing World Cup in Bombay, India. In the finals, he was defeated by Cuban boxer Juan Carlos Lemus. He qualified for the 1991 Pan American Games and was later eliminated in the quarterfinals by Juan Carlos Lemus, then the number one ranked light middleweight in the world.

Downey, carrying a 111-11 record, defended his Canadian title against Stéphane Ouellet in Saskatoon in September 1991, where he dropped a close fight.

After eye surgery, he returned in February 1992 to outpoint Jamie Sparks, reclaiming the Canadian title and a spot on the Olympic boxing team. He then qualified for Barcelona '92 with a silver medal at a pre-Olympic tournament in the Dominican Republic that April.

At 23, he competed at the 1992 Summer Olympics in Barcelona.

=== 1992 Summer Olympics results ===
- Competed as a light middleweight at the 1992 Barcelona Olympic Games. The result was:
  - Lost to Hendrik Simangunsong (Indonesia) 5-12

Across 15 years of amateur boxing, the two-time Olympian tallied 160 wins with only 20 losses.

== Pro career ==
Downey turned pro in 1994 with much success. He retired in 2000 with a pro record of 16-2-1.

== Personal life ==
Raymond has four children: a son, Tylor Flint; a daughter, Raya Flint; and two younger daughters, Genevia and Summer Downey.

He has a distant family connection to William Hall.

== Awards and recognitions ==
- 1988 Viscount Alexander Award
- 1988 Nova Scotia Male Athlete of the Year
- 1990 Boxing Canada Male Boxer of the Year
- 2015 Nova Scotia Sport Hall of Fame inductee
- 2024 Boxing Canada Hall of Fame inductee
