= Antwun Echols =

American boxer (1971–2023)

Personal information
- Nickname: Kid Dynamite
- Born: December 4, 1970 Memphis, Tennessee, U.S.
- Died: July 2, 2023 (aged 52) Davenport, Iowa, U.S.
- Height: 5 ft 11 in (180 cm)
- Weight: Light heavyweight Super middleweight Middleweight

Boxing career
- Reach: 73 in (185 cm)
- Stance: Orthodox

Boxing record
- Total fights: 58
- Wins: 32
- Win by KO: 28
- Losses: 22
- Draws: 4

Antwun Echols (December 4, 1970 – July 2, 2023) was an American boxer who was a world middleweight contender throughout the late 1990s and early 2000s. His hometown was Davenport, Iowa.

== Amateur career ==
He missed out on a spot on the 1992 United States Olympic boxing team by losing to Raúl Márquez in the final of the trials.

== Professional career ==
Echols turned professional in 1993. In 1999, he challenged IBF middleweight title holder Bernard Hopkins but lost via decision. The following year he lost a rematch with Hopkins, this time losing via technical knock-out in the 10th round.

In 2001, he fought Charles Brewer. Echols went down three times in round two, but recovered in round three to score a technical knock-out win to capture the vacant NABA super middleweight title. In 2003, Echols had another opportunity for a title shot after the WBA Super Middleweight Title was vacated when Sven Ottke was upgraded to 'Super' champion status. He battled Anthony Mundine for the vacant title, but lost a close decision. In 2005, Echols lost an IBF Middleweight Eliminator to Kingsley Ikeke when he was stopped in the 10th round.

Echols's record from 2005 to his retirement was 1–16–3, as his run as a championship caliber fighter had long ended. In October 2015, Echols was defeated by Derrick Findley in three rounds. It was the seventh consecutive bout in which he lost in the third round. His lasted recorded interview is in the Amazon podcast Everipedia Boxing Show with Matthew E. O'Neil. Echols lost his last ten professional boxing matches, including losses to Mike Jimenez and to Lamar Russ.

== Personal life ==
On July 30, 2007, in Davenport, Iowa, Echols was shot in the leg while trying to break up a fight. In 2013, when asked how many children he has, he replied "Twenty-three, I think," admitting it could be more. At the time, he was living with his fiancé and four children in Dade City, Florida.

=== Death ===
Echols died on July 2, 2023, at the age of 52. He had been suffering from diabetes.

== Professional boxing record ==
58 fights	32 wins	22 losses
By knockout	28	15
By decision	3	7
By disqualification	1	0
Draws	4	

Key to abbreviations used for results
DQ	Disqualification	RTD	Corner retirement
KO	Knockout	SD	Split decision / split draw
MD	Majority decision / majority draw	TD	Technical decision / technical draw
NC	No contest	TKO	Technical knockout
PTS	Points decision	UD	Unanimous decision / unanimous draw

Boxing record
No.	Result	Record	Opponent	Type	Round(s)	Time	Date	Location	Notes
58	Loss	32–22–4	Lamar Russ	KO	1 (8)	0:18	30 Apr 2016	Crown Coliseum, Fayetteville, North Carolina, U.S.	
57	Loss	32–21–4	Derrick Findley	TKO	3 (6)	1:13	17 Oct 2015	Civic Center, Hammond, Indiana, U.S.	
56	Loss	32–20–4	Dyah Davis	KO	3 (10)	2:12	24 Aug 2013	Rec Center, Wilson, North Carolina, U.S.	
55	Loss	32–19–4	Mike Jimenez	TKO	3 (6)	2:58	21 Nov 2012	Horseshoe Casino Hammond, Hammond, Indiana, U.S.	
54	Loss	32–18–4	Patrick Majewski	TKO	3 (8)	?	7 Apr 2012	Lander's Center, Southaven, Mississippi, U.S.	
53	Loss	32–17–4	Marcus Oliveira	TKO	3 (8)	2:01	28 Jan 2012	Menominee Resort Casino, Menominee, Wisconsin, U.S.	
52	Loss	32–16–4	Alejandro Berrio	TKO	3 (8)	1:04	26 Feb 2011	Eihusen Arena, Grand Island, Nebraska, U.S.	
51	Loss	32–15–4	Joe Spina	TKO	3 (10)	0:49	2 Oct 2010	Foxwoods Resort Casino, Mashantucket, Connecticut, U.S.	
50	Loss	32–14–4	Darryl Cunningham	KO	3 (8)	2:54	23 Jul 2010	Royal Oak Music Theatre, Royal Oak, Michigan, U.S.	
49	Loss	32–13–4	Caleb Truax	UD	10	N/a	11 Jun 2010	St. Paul Armory, Saint Paul, Minnesota, U.S.	
48	Win	32–12–4	Fred Thomas	KO	6 (6)	1:32	20 Mar 2010	Crowne Plaza Hotel, Milwaukee, Wisconsin U.S.	
47	Loss	31–12–4	Angel Hernandez	RTD	6 (8)	3:00	21 Aug 2008	Horseshoe Casino Hammond, Hammond, Indiana, U.S.	
46	Loss	31–11–4	Phil Williams	TKO	7 (8)	0:45	5 Jun 2009	Grand Casino Hinckley, Hinckley, Minnesota, U.S.	
45	Loss	31–10–4	Roman Karmazin	TKO	7 (10)	1:52	21 Mar 2009	Playboy Mansion, Beverly Hills, California, U.S.	For NABF middleweight title
44	Loss	31–9–4	Michael Walker	MD	8	N/a	3 Nov 2008	Radisson Star Plaza, Merrillville, Indiana, U.S.	
43	Loss	31–8–4	Peter Quillin	UD	10	N/a	16 Apr 2008	Hammerstein Ballroom, New York City, New York, U.S.	
42	Draw	31–7–4	Michael Walker	MD	10	N/a	29 Feb 2008	Paragon Casino & Resort, Marksville, Louisiana, U.S.	
41	Loss	31–7–3	Fulgencio Zuniga	UD	10	N/a	23 Jun 2007	Thomas & Mack Center, Las Vegas, Nevada, U.S.	
40	Draw	31–6–3	Rubin Williams	PTS	12	N/a	12 Jan 2007	The Palace of Auburn Hills, Auburn Hills, Michigan, U.S.	For IBA and NBA super middleweight titles
39	Draw	31–6–2	Mohamad Said	MD	10	N/a	5 Apr 2006	New Orleans Arena, New Orleans, Louisiana, U.S.	
38	Loss	31–6–1	Kingsley Ikeke	RTD	10 (12)	3:00	15 Apr 2005	Northern Quest Resort & Casino, Airway Heights, Washington, U.S.	IBF Middleweight title eliminator
37	Win	31–5–1	Jameel Wilson	TKO	7 (10)	2:26	2 Dec 2004	Northern Quest Resort & Casino, Airway Heights, Washington, U.S.	
36	Win	30–5–1	Ross Thompson	UD	10	N/a	8 May 2004	MGM Grand Garden Arena, Las Vegas, Nevada, U.S.	
35	Loss	29–5–1	Anthony Mundine	UD	12	N/a	3 Sep 2003	Sydney Entertainment Centre, Sydney, New South Wales, Australia	For vacant WBA (Regular) super middleweight title.
34	Win	29–4–1	Richard Grant	TKO	3 (12)	0:59	3 Aug 2002	Dodge Theatre, Phoenix, Arizona, U.S.	Retained NABF super middleweight title IBF Super middleweight title eliminator
33	Win	28–4–1	Oscar Bravo	TKO	1 (12)	0:42	27 Jun 2002	Santa Ana Star Casino, Bernalillo, New Mexico, U.S.	Retained NABF and NABA super middleweight titles
32	Win	27–4–1	Kabary Salem	UD	12	N/a	9 Apr 2002	Ramada Inn, Rosemont, Illinois, U.S.	Won vacant NABF and retained NABA super middleweight titles
31	Win	26–4–1	Lawrence Chapman	DQ	5 (12)	2:47	21 Dec 2001	Pechanga Resort and Casino, Temecula, California, U.S.	Retained NABA super middleweight title Chapman disqualified for refusing to stop holding
30	Win	25–4–1	Charles Brewer	TKO	3 (12)	1:21	19 May 2001	Mohegan Sun, Uncasville, Connecticut, U.S.	Won vacant NABA super middleweight title
29	Loss	24–4–1	Bernard Hopkins	TKO	10 (12)	1:42	1 Dec 2000	The Venetian Las Vegas, Las Vegas, Nevada, U.S.	For IBF middleweight title
28	Win	24–3–1	Lionel Ortiz	RTD	7 (12)	3:00	5 May 2000	Cherokee Casino, Cherokee, North Carolina, U.S.	Won vacant NABF and USBA middleweight titles
27	Win	23–3–1	Anthony Ivory	UD	10	N/a	17 Feb 2000	River Center, Davenport, Iowa, U.S.	
26	Loss	22–3–1	Bernard Hopkins	UD	12	N/a	12 Dec 1999	Miccosukee Resort and Gaming, Miami, Florida, U.S.	For IBF middleweight title
25	Win	22–2–1	Roland Rangel	TKO	2 (12)	1:40	22 Jan 1999	Horseshoe Casino Tunica, Tunica, Mississippi, U.S.	Retained NABF and USBA middleweight titles
24	Win	21–2–1	Urbano Gurrola	TKO	6 (12)	1:03	28 Jul 1998	Horseshoe Casino Tunica, Tunica, Mississippi, U.S.	Retained NABF and USBA middleweight titles
23	Win	20–2–1	Kevin Tillman	RTD	8 (12)	3:00	7 Apr 1998	Harrah's Cherokee, Cherokee, North Carolina, U.S.	Retained NABF and USBA middleweight titles
22	Win	19–2–1	Brian Barbosa	KO	9 (12)	2:59	10 Feb 1998	Casino Rouge, Baton Rouge, Louisiana, U.S.	Retained USBA middleweight title Won vacant NABF middleweight title
21	Win	18–2–1	Billy Robertson	KO	3	?	30 Sep 1997	Casino Magic, Bay Saint Louis, Mississippi, U.S.	
20	Win	17–2–1	Earl Monroe	TKO	3 (12)	2:25	27 Jul 1997	Belle of Baton Rouge Casino, Baton Rouge, Louisiana, U.S.	Won vacant USBA middleweight title
19	Win	16–2–1	Andre Haddock	KO	3 (8)	1:09	20 May 1997	Medieval Times, Lyndhurst, New Jersey, U.S.	
18	Win	15–2–1	George Brown	TKO	6 (8)	2:58	10 May 1997	MARK of the Quad Cities, Moline, Illinois, U.S.	
17	Draw	14–2–1	Eric Lucas	PTS	10	N/a	6 Dec 1996	Centre Georges-Vezina, Chicoutimi, Quebec, Canada	
16	Win	14–2	Roy Hundley	KO	2 (4)	2:35	29 Nov 1996	Sullivan Brothers Center, Waterloo, Iowa, U.S.	
15	Loss	13–2	Chris Johnson	MD	10	N/a	11 Oct 1996	International Plaza Hotel, Toronto, Ontario, Canada	
14	Win	13–1	Eric Crumble	TKO	1 (6)	1:25	30 Mar 1996	Sullivan Brothers Center, Waterloo, Iowa, U.S.	
13	Win	12–1	Oscar Washington	TKO	4 (8)	?	9 Dec 1995	MARK of the Quad Cities, Moline, Illinois, U.S.	
12	Win	11–1	Marris Virgil	TKO	2 (8)	0:22	18 Oct 1995	MARK of the Quad Cities, Moline, Illinois, U.S.	
11	Win	10–1	Dan Butters	KO	2 (6)	?	13 May 1995	River Center, Davenport, Iowa, U.S.	
10	Win	9–1	Abdullah Ramadan	KO	2 (6)	2:23	1 Mar 1995	War Memorial Auditorium, Fort Lauderdale, Florida, U.S.	
9	Win	8–1	Edgar Borja	KO	2	?	17 Dec 1994	Ruminahui Coliseum, Quito, Pichincha, Ecuador	
8	Win	7–1	Joe Harris	KO	3 (8)	?	22 Oct 1994	Palmer Auditorium, Davenport, Iowa, U.S.	Won vacant Iowa middleweight title
7	Win	6–1	Willie Perry	KO	6 (6)	1:18	8 Oct 1994	Sterling, Illinois, U.S.	
6	Win	5–1	Tyrone Mack	TKO	2	?	31 Jul 1994	Toad Holler Night Club, Des Moines, Iowa, U.S.	
5	Win	4–1	Hector Ramirez	KO	3	?	1 Jul 1994	LeClaire Park, Davenport, Iowa, U.S.	
4	Win	3–1	Leon Shavers	KO	1	?	8 Jan 1994	River Center, Davenport, Iowa, U.S.	
3	Win	2–1	Clifton Woods	TKO	1	?	23 Oct 1993	St. Joseph Civic Arena, Saint Joseph, Missouri, U.S.	
2	Win	1–1	Donald Tucker	KO	1 (4)	1:42	31 Jul 1993	Palmer Auditorium, Davenport, Iowa, U.S.	
1	Loss	0–1	Anthony Ivory	KO	1 (4)	?	22 May 1993	River Center, Davenport, Iowa, U.S.	Professional debut

Sporting positions
Regional boxing titles
Vacant Title last held by Brian Barbosa	USBA Middleweight Champion; 27 July 1997 – November 1999	Vacant Title next held by Himself
Vacant Title last held by Otis Grant	NABF Middleweight Champion; 10 February 1998 – November 1999	Vacant Title next held by Himself
Vacant Title last held by Himself	NABF Middleweight Champion; USBA Middleweight Champion; 5 May 2000 – November 2000	Vacant Title next held by Tito Mendoza
Vacant Title last held by Himself	NABF Middleweight Champion; USBA Middleweight Champion; 5 May 2000 – November 2000	Vacant Title next held by Robert Allen
Vacant Title last held by Will McIntyre	NABA Super Middleweight Champion; 19 May 2001 – June 2003	Vacant Title next held by Jeff Lacy
Vacant Title last held by Charles Brewer	NABF Super Middleweight Champion; 9 April 2002 – June 2003	Vacant Title next held by Scott Pemberton
