= György Mizsei =

Hungarian boxer (born 1971)

Personal information
- Full name: Mizsei György
- Nationality: Hungary
- Born: September 30, 1971 (age 55) Kiskunfélegyháza, Bács-Kiskun
- Height: 1.78 m (5 ft 10 in)
- Weight: 71 kg (157 lb)

Sport
- Sport: Boxing
- Weight class: Light Middleweight
- Club: Kiskunfélegyházi H. Sportegyesület
Medal record
Olympic Games
Bronze medal – third place	1992 Barcelona	Light Middleweight
European Amateur Championships
Bronze medal – third place	1991 Gothenburg	Welterweight
Bronze medal – third place	1996 Vejle	Light Middleweight

György Mizsei (born November 30, 1971, in Kiskunfélegyháza) is a former professional Hungarian boxer, who won a bronze medal in the light middleweight division at the 1992 Summer Olympics.

He gained the bronze medal at the 1996 European Amateur Boxing Championships in Vejle, Denmark. His son (György Jr.) also professional boxer who won EBU European Union lightweight title in 2014.

== Amateur Highlights ==
- 1991 bronze medalist in European Amateur Boxing Championships in Göteborg, Sweden
- 1996 bronze medalist in European Amateur Boxing Championships in Vejle, Denmark
- Representing Hungary, won the Light Middleweight bronze medal at the 1992 Olympics in Barcelona
- Member of the Hungarian Olympic Team of Atlanta in Light Middleweights
- 1992 Olympic Results - Boxed as a Light Middleweight (71 kg)
  - 1st Round - Defeated Fabrizio de Chiara of Italy, 13:4
  - Round of 16 - Defeated Hendrik Simangunsong of Indonesia, 17:5
  - Quarterfinals - Defeated Maselino Masoe of American Samoa, 17:3
  - Semifinals - Lost to Juan Carlos Lemus of Cuba, 2:10
- 1996 Olympic Results - Boxed as a Light Middleweight (71 kg)
  - 1st Round - Defeated Richard Rowles of Australia, 10:2
  - Round of 16 - Lost to Markus Beyer of Germany, 6:14

== Pro career ==
In 1997 Mizsei began his professional career, and he had limited success as a pro. After two fights, including a loss to future titlist Armand Krajnc, Mizsei retired with a record of 1–1–0. After more than nine years layoff, Mizsei reactivated his pro career.
