= Oscar De La Hoya vs. Bernard Hopkins =

Boxing match

It's History
- Date: September 18, 2004
- Venue: MGM Grand Garden Arena, Paradise, Nevada, U.S.
- Title(s) on the line: WBA, WBC, IBF, WBO and The Ring undisputed middleweight championship

Tale of the tape
Boxer	Bernard Hopkins	Oscar De La Hoya
Nickname	The Executioner	The Golden Boy
Hometown	Philadelphia, Pennsylvania, U.S.	East Los Angeles, California, U.S.
Purse	$10,000,000	$30,000,000
Pre-fight record	44–2–1 (1) (31 KO)	37–3 (29 KO)
Age	39 years, 8 months	31 years, 7 months
Height	6 ft 1 in (185 cm)	5 ft 10 1/2 in (179 cm)
Weight	156 lb (71 kg)	155 lb (70 kg)
Style	Orthodox	Orthodox
Recognition	WBA (Unified), WBC, IBF and The Ring; Undisputed Middleweight Champion; The Ring pound-for-pound No. 1 ranked fighter	WBO; Middleweight Champion; The Ring No. 9 ranked pound-for-pound fighter 6-division world champion

Result
- Hopkins wins via 9th-round KO

Oscar De La Hoya vs. Bernard Hopkins, billed as It's History, was a professional boxing match contested on September 18, 2004 for Hopkins' WBA (Undisputed), WBC, IBF, and The Ring middleweight championships, and Oscar De La Hoya's WBO middleweight championship.

== Background ==
After losing the WBA and WBC light middleweight titles to Shane Mosley in September 2003, five-division world champion Oscar De La Hoya decided to move up to the middleweight division to challenge undisputed middleweight champion Bernard Hopkins, who had been middleweight champion for nearly a decade and had not lost a fight in over 11 years. Before the two would fight each other, De La Hoya and Hopkins would first have to get past Felix Sturm and Robert Allen, respectively. In a doubleheader event broadcast by HBO pay-per-view, Hopkins easily defeated Allen by a lopsided unanimous decision to retain his undisputed title, but De La Hoya struggled in his match with Sturm and only narrowly escaped with a unanimous decision (115–113 on all three scorecards) to capture Sturm's WBO middleweight title (becoming the first six-division champion in boxing history) and officially put his anticipated match with Hopkins on.

Many, including Sturm himself, felt that De La Hoya had clearly lost the fight and had been gifted the decision for the lucrative Hopkins–De La Hoya bout to continue forward. Sturm and his promoter filed a protest with the Nevada Athletic Commission in an attempt to have the decision overturned, but commission head Marc Ratner turned it down, stating there was no basis for a review.

With Sturm's protest out of the way, De La Hoya and Hopkins would proceed with their fight and agreed to a catchweight – a rarity for championship fights – of 158 pounds, in order to level the playing fields for the smaller De La Hoya, who had only one middleweight bout to his credit. Because of Hopkins' size advantage and his vast experience in the middleweight division, De La Hoya, for the first time in his professional career, was considered the "underdog", with the odds makers in Las Vegas favoring Hopkins at 2–1. De La Hoya, however, was scheduled to make a career high $30 million, while Hopkins would net $10 million, also a career high.

== The fight ==
Through the first eight rounds, the two boxers fought a largely tactical, defense-oriented match. Going into the deciding ninth round, Hopkins was well ahead on two of the judges' official scorecards with scores of 79–73 and 78–74, while De La Hoya held a narrow lead on the third with a score of 77–75. In the ninth, Hopkins began to aggressively attack De La Hoya, and with 1:34 left in the round, sent De La Hoya down with a well-executed left hook to De La Hoya's liver. De La Hoya crumpled to the mat in pain and made no effort to answer the referee's 10-count as he was counted out at 1:38 of the round, giving Hopkins the knockout victory. For De La Hoya it was his first knockout loss in his professional career. It also remains the final knockout victory of Hopkins' career to date. The ten wins he picked up since were all by way of decision.

== Aftermath ==
Prior to the fight, there had been talks of De La Hoya retiring after the Hopkins fight, but after his loss, he hinted that he would continue his career, stating, "I know I'm a better fighter than I [showed]". Instead, De La Hoya took a 20-month hiatus, sitting out all of 2005, before announcing in January 2006 that he would return to fight Ricardo Mayorga for the WBC light-middleweight title in May of that year. Despite his lengthy layoff, De La Hoya dominated Mayorga en route to a sixth-round knockout victory to recapture the WBC light-middleweight title.

Hopkins, meanwhile, followed his victory over De La Hoya with a unanimous decision victory over the highly ranked British fighter Howard Eastman in February 2005. The victory was a historic one, as Hopkins tied Larry Holmes' record of 20 consecutive successful title defenses. The victory over Eastman marked both the final successful defense of his middleweight title and his final win as a middleweight. He dropped the titles in his next fight to Jermain Taylor and, after an unsuccessful bid to regain the titles in a rematch with Taylor, moved up to the light-heavyweight division.

== Sales ==
The fight drew approximately one million pay–per–view buys and grossed $56 million in revenue. For a time, this made the fight the second most lucrative non-heavyweight bout in boxing history, behind only De La Hoya's 1999 match with Félix Trinidad, which drew 1.4 million buys and $71 million in revenue. This gave De La Hoya the top four most lucrative non-heavyweight fights in boxing history, as his 2002 bout (935,000 buys) against Fernando Vargas and his 2003 rematch with Shane Mosley (950,000 buys) were also on the list.

== Undercard ==
Confirmed bouts:

- WBA (Super)/IBF featherweight championship bout: (Mexico) Juan Manuel Márquez vs. (Mexico) Orlando Salido

Márquez defeats Salido by unanimous decision (118–110, 117–111, 117–111)

- WBO light middleweight eliminator bout: (Ghana) Kofi Jantuah vs. (Mexico) Marco Antonio Rubio

Jantuah defeats Rubio by first-round knockout

- Middleweight bout: (United States) Kelly Pavlik vs. (United States) Carlton Holland

Pavlik defeats Holland by second-round knockout

== Broadcasting ==
Country	Broadcaster
Australia	Main Event
Canada	Viewers Choice
Hungary	Sport 1
United Kingdom	Sky Sports
United States	HBO

Preceded by vs. Robert Allen III	Bernard Hopkins's bouts 18 September 2004	Succeeded by vs. Howard Eastman
Preceded by vs. Felix Sturm	Oscar De La Hoya's bouts 18 September 2004	Succeeded by vs. Ricardo Mayorga
