= Kingsley Ikeke =

Nigerian boxer

Personal information
- Nationality: Nigerian
- Born: Kingsley Ikeke; February 25, 1973 (age 53) Benin City, Nigeria

Boxing career
- Reach: 79 in (201 cm)

Boxing record
- Total fights: 30
- Wins: 27
- Win by KO: 14
- Losses: 3

Kingsley Ikeke (born February 25, 1973) is a US-based Nigerian professional boxer who competed from 1995 to 2010. He lost to Anthony Hanshaw on points, KOd Antwun Echols but was KOd by Armenia's Arthur Abraham in the fifth round for the vacant IBF middleweight title. Later he lost to Jean Pascal.

== Professional boxing record ==
30 fights	27 wins	3 losses
By knockout	14	1
By decision	13	2

No.	Result	Record	Opponent	Type	Round, time	Date	Location	More
30	Win	27–3	(United States) Zane Marks	MD	10	Apr 3, 2010	(United States) Emerald Queen Casino, Tacoma, Washington, U.S.	Retained interim NABA super middleweight title
29	Win	26–3	(Canada) Mark Woolnough	SD	10	Aug 29, 2009	(United States) Emerald Queen Casino, Tacoma, Washington, U.S.	Won interim NABA super middleweight title
28	Win	25–3	(United States) Emmett Linton	KO	5 (10), 2:34	Jun 20, 2009	(United States) Emerald Queen Casino, Tacoma, Washington, U.S.	
27	Win	24–3	(United States) Dhafir Smith	SD	6	Jun 13, 2008	(United States) Connecticut Convention Center, Hartford, Connecticut, U.S.	
26	Loss	23–3	(Canada) Jean Pascal	UD	12	Aug 3, 2007	Centre Pierre Charbonneau, Montreal, Quebec, Canada	For NABF super middleweight title
25	Loss	23–2	(Germany) Arthur Abraham	KO	5 (12), 1:36	Dec 10, 2005	Arena Leipzig, Leipzig, Germany	For vacant IBF middleweight title
24	Win	23–1	(United States) Antwun Echols	RTD	10 (12), 3:00	Apr 15, 2005	(United States) Northern Quest Resort & Casino, Airway Heights, Washington, U.S.	
23	Win	22–1	(Venezuela) Marcos Primera	TKO	4 (10), 3:00	Feb 19, 2005	(United States) Staples Center, Los Angeles, California, U.S.	
22	Win	21–1	(Mexico) Rene Arostegui	TKO	5 (10), 1:55	Oct 28, 2004	(United States) Seminole Hard Rock Hotel & Casino Hollywood, Hollywood, Florida, U.S.	
21	Win	20–1	(United States) Alfredo Cuevas	TD	8 (10), 3:00	Jun 5, 2004	(United States) MGM Grand Garden Arena, Paradise, Nevada, U.S.	
20	Win	19–1	(Mexico) Quirino Garcia	UD	12	Apr 29, 2004	(United States) Laredo Entertainment Center, Laredo, Texas, U.S.	Retained NABF middleweight title
19	Win	18–1	(United States) Kenny Ellis	TKO	6 (12), 2:06	Aug 29, 2003	(United States) Emerald Queen Casino, Tacoma, Washington, U.S.	Retained NABA middleweight title; Won vacant NABF and WBO NABO middleweight titles
18	Win	17–1	(Canada) Willard Lewis	TKO	3 (8)	Jul 5, 2003	CanWest Global Park, Winnipeg, Manitoba, Canada	
17	Win	16–1	(Belize) Errol Banner	UD	10	Jan 24, 2003	(United States) Seaside Park, Ventura, California, U.S.	
16	Win	15–1	(United States) Marlon Hayes	TKO	5 (12), 2:50	May 17, 2002	(United States) The Orleans, Paradise, Nevada, U.S.	Won vacant NABA middleweight title
15	Loss	14–1	(United States) Anthony Hanshaw	UD	10	Jul 20, 2001	(United States) Canton Memorial Civic Center, Canton, Ohio, U.S.	
14	Win	14–0	(Mexico) Rigoberto Placencia	TKO	6 (10)	May 12, 2001	(United States) Palace Indian Gaming Center, Lemoore, California, U.S.	Won interim WBC FECARBOX middleweight title
13	Win	13–0	(Mexico) Juan Carlos Barreto	UD	6	Mar 29, 2001	(United States) Hollywood Park Casino, Inglewood, California, U.S.	
12	Win	12–0	(United States) Rudy Lovato	SD	12	Aug 12, 2000	(United States) San Juan Pueblo, New Mexico, U.S.	Won WBC FECARBOX super welterweight title
11	Win	11–0	(Mexico) Ameth Aranda	TKO	5 (?)	May 28, 2000	(United States) Albuquerque, New Mexico, U.S.	
10	Win	10–0	(Belize) Errol Banner	KO	8 (8)	Feb 24, 2000	(United States) Hollywood Park Casino, Inglewood, California, U.S.	
9	Win	9–0	(United States) Edgar Chairez	KO	2 (?)	Dec 18, 1999	(United States) Spotlight 29 Casino, Coachella, California, U.S.	
8	Win	8–0	(Mexico) Martin Quiroz	TKO	3 (6), 3:00	Aug 21, 1999	(United States) Spotlight 29 Casino, Coachella, California, U.S.	
7	Win	7–0	(United States) Jose Cataneo	TKO	2 (6), 3:00	Jul 24, 1999	(United States) Spotlight 29 Casino, Coachella, California, U.S.	
6	Win	6–0	(United States) Richard Gonzalez	UD	6	Jun 19, 1999	(United States) Spotlight 29 Casino, Coachella, California, U.S.	
5	Win	5–0	(United States) Damon Jones	KO	1 (4)	Feb 6, 1999	(United States) Big League Dreams Sports Park, Cathedral City, California, U.S.	
4	Win	4–0	(Canada) Martin Berthiaume	UD	6	Nov 11, 1997	Montreal Casino, Montreal, Quebec, Canada	
3	Win	3–0	(United States) Anthony Bonsante	PTS	6	Jun 6, 1997	Winnipeg, Manitoba, Canada	
2	Win	2–0	(Canada) Mike Riendeau	UD	6	Oct 7, 1996	Edmonton Convention Centre, Edmonton, Alberta, Canada	
1	Win	1–0	(Canada) Steve Weir	UD	6	Jun 29, 1995	Moncton, New Brunswick, Canada	
