= Smikle =

Smikle is a surname. Notable people with this surname include:

- Brian Smikle (born 1985), English footballer
- Gary Smikle (born 1966), Jamaican boxer
- Traves Smikle (born 1992), Jamaican athlete
- Deb Smikle (born 2002), Canadian internet personality
