= Lucas França =

Lucas França may refer to:

- Lucas França (boxer) (born 1968), Brazilian boxer
- Lucas França (footballer) (born 1996), Brazilian footballer
