= William Joppy vs. Roberto Durán =

Boxing match

Legendary History
- Date: August 28, 1998
- Venue: Las Vegas Hilton, Winchester, Nevada, U.S.
- Title(s) on the line: WBA middleweight title

Tale of the tape
Boxer	William Joppy	Roberto Durán
Nickname		Manos de Piedra ("Hands of Stone")
Hometown	Lincoln Park, Rockville, Maryland, U.S.	Panama City, Panama Province, Panama
Purse	$270,000	$250,000
Pre-fight record	25–1–1 (KO)	101–13 (70 KO)
Age	27 years, 11 months	47 years, 2 months
Height	5 ft 9 in (175 cm)	5 ft 7 1/2 in (171 cm)
Weight	160 lb (73 kg)	159 lb (72 kg)
Style	Orthodox	Orthodox
Recognition	WBA; Middleweight Champion	WBA; No. 7 Ranked Middleweight; 4-division world champion

Result
- Joppy wins via 3rd-round TKO

William Joppy vs. Roberto Durán, billed as Legendary History, was a professional boxing match contested on August 28, 1998, for the WBA middleweight title.

== Background ==
In his previous fight, William Joppy had regained the WBA middleweight title after defeating Julio César Green, whom had upset him the previous year to take the title, in a rematch. For the first defense of his second reign, 28-year old Joppy was matched up against former 4-division world champion Roberto Durán, whom at 47-years old was two decades older than his opponent and had turned professional in 1967, 3 years prior to Joppy's birth. Durán had not fought for a major world title since challenging Sugar Ray Leonard for WBC super middleweight title in December 1989 and had had limited success since then, only defeating unknown journeymen and losing the three big fights (two against Vinny Paz and one against Héctor Camacho) he did have.

Durán, who had been experiencing financial troubles, accepted Joppy's promoter Don King's offer of a $250,000 purse. After his payday became public knowledge, a Florida judge issued an injunction against King and Showtime (whom was to broadcast the fight), claiming Durán owed $41,000 in child support to the mother of his 10-year-old son, while the IRS looked to seize part of the purse due to Durán owing $300,000 in unpaid taxes.

When the fight was first announced, it was to take place on June 6 as the featured undercard bout on an event headlined by an Evander Holyfield–Henry Akinwande heavyweight title bout. However, when Akinwande tested positive for Hepatitis B the day before the fight, the entire card was cancelled. The Joppy–Durán fight was then rescheduled for August 29 (and then subsequently moved up a day to August 28) with a Bernard Hopkins–Robert Allen IBF middleweight championship as the co-headliner.

== The Fights ==
=== Hopkins vs. Allen ===
Legendary History:Bernard Hopkins vs. Robert Allen
- Title(s) on the line: IBF middleweight title

Tale of the tape
Boxer	(United States) Bernard Hopkins	(United States) Robert Allen
Nickname	"The Executioner"	"Armed and Dangerous"
Hometown	Philadelphia, Pennsylvania	Atlanta, Georgia
Purse	$560,000	
Pre-fight record	34–2–1 (26 KO)	22–2 (17 KO)
Age	33 years, 7 months	29 years, 2 months
Height	6 ft 1 in (185 cm)	5 ft 9 1/2 in (177 cm)
Weight	159 lb (72 kg)	160 lb (73 kg)
Style	Orthodox	Orthodox
Recognition	IBF; Middleweight Champion	IBF; No. 1 Ranked Middleweight

Result
- No contest

In the chief support, IBF middleweight champion Bernard Hopkins made the eighth defense of his title against Robert Allen.

Hopkins was a 4 to 1 favorite entering the bout.

==== The fight ====
After three lackluster rounds, which had featured much holding and clinching, with Allen as the aggressor and appearing to frustrate the champion, referee Mills Lane moved in to break the two boxers apart and pushed them both, with less than 10 seconds left in round. This send Hopkins through the ropes and out of ring injuring his left ankle in the process.

After being examined by ringside doctor Flip Homansky, it was determined that Hopkins should not continue and the fight was ruled a no contest, despite Hopkins wanting to continue.

==== Aftermath ====
Speaking in the aftermath, Lane said "The momentum of everyone caused him to fall out of the ring. I've seen everything in boxing not this. What can I say!". Hopkins would say "I'm not a wrestler, I don't know how to fall. But I don't want my fans to say I quit." He would also call for an immediate rematch.

At the time of stoppage Hopkins led on two of the judges scorecards 30-27 and 29-28 with the third having Allen ahead 29-28.

With Hopkins' ankle needing time to heal, Allen would three weeks later, face No. 10 ranked Abdullah Ramadan for an "Interim title", stopping him in the first round.

Despite rumours of a rematch with Roy Jones Jr. the two would meet again in February 1999.

Preceded by vs. Simon Brown	Bernard Hopkins's bouts 28 August 1998	Succeeded by Rematch
Preceded by vs. Lloyd Bryan	Robert Allen's bouts 28 August 1998	Succeeded by vs. Abdullah Ramadan

=== Main Event ===
Durán, looking every bit his age, was dominated by Joppy who landed punches nearly at will. After easily winning the first two rounds on the scorecards, Joppy wobbled Durán early in the third round and proceeded to continue to brutalize Durán, who offered little offensively or defensively, for the remainder of the round until referee Joe Cortez stopped the fight with six seconds left in the round and awarded Joppy the victory by technical knockout.

== Aftermath ==
After the fight Durán all but officially announced his retirement stating simply "I am finished.", though he would return the following year and fight until 2001. Said Joppy of the victory "This was kind of a sad victory for me, Roberto Duran is a great legend. I've watched him fight since I was a kid. But it's my time now. He's had his years. I want to have mine."

== Fight card ==
Confirmed bouts:

Weight Class	Weight		vs.		Method	Round	Notes
Middleweight	160 lbs.	William Joppy (c)	def.	Roberto Durán	TKO	3/12	^{Note 1}
Middleweight	160 lbs.	Bernard Hopkins (c)	vs.	Robert Allen	NC	4/12	^{Note 2}
Cruiserweight	190 lbs.	Saúl Montana (c)	def.	Tiwon Taylor	TKO	1/12	^{Note 3}
Light Heavyweight	168 lbs.	Julio César Green	def.	Joaquin Velasquez	TKO	6/10

^Note 1 For WBA Middleweight title
^Note 2 For IBF Middleweight title
^Note 3 For NABA Cruiserweight title

== Broadcasting ==
Country	Broadcaster
United States	Showtime

Preceded by vs. Julio César Green II	William Joppy's bouts 28 August 1998	Succeeded by vs. Napoleon Pitt
Preceded by vs. Felix Jose Hernandez	Roberto Durán's bouts 28 August 1998	Succeeded by vs. Omar Gonzalez
