= Oscar De La Hoya vs. Felix Sturm =

Boxing match

Collision Course
- Date: June 5, 2004
- Venue: MGM Grand Garden Arena, Paradise, Nevada, U.S.
- Title(s) on the line: WBO middleweight title

Tale of the tape
Boxer	Felix Sturm	Oscar De La Hoya
Nickname	The Fighter	The Golden Boy
Hometown	Hamburg, Germany	East Los Angeles, California, U.S.
Pre-fight record	20–0 (9 KO)	36–3 (29 KO)
Age	25 years, 4 months	31 years, 4 months
Height	6 ft 0 in (183 cm)	5 ft 10 1/2 in (179 cm)
Weight	160 lb (73 kg)	160 lb (73 kg)
Style	Orthodox	Orthodox
Recognition	WBO; Middleweight Champion; The Ring; No. 9 Ranked Middleweight	WBO; No. 1 Ranked Middleweight; The Ring pound-for-pound No. 4 ranked fighter 4-division world champion

Result
- De La Hoya wins via 12-round unanimous decision (115–113, 115–113, 115–113)

Oscar De La Hoya vs. Felix Sturm, billed as Collision Course, was a professional boxing match contested on June 5, 2004 for the WBO middleweight championship.

== Background ==
Following a controversial loss to Shane Mosley that cost him the WBA and WBC light-middleweight titles in September 2003, Oscar De La Hoya announced his intentions to move up to the middleweight division to challenge undefeated WBO champion Felix Sturm, followed by a unification bout with Undisputed Middleweight Champion Bernard Hopkins should he defeat Sturm.

As a precursor to their planned fight, Hopkins and De La Hoya agreed to take part in a joint doubleheader pay-per-view event broadcast by HBO dubbed "Collision Course". Hopkins would first take on his mandatory challenger in Robert Allen (who had fought Hopkins twice before in the late 90s).

The Hopkins–Allen fight was to be then followed by the main event between De La Hoya and Sturm, with De La Hoya needing a victory in order to preserve his match with Hopkins.

== The fights ==
=== Castillo vs. Lazcano ===
The first of the featured bouts saw Jose Luis Castillo win the vacant WBC and The Ring lightweight titles, after defeating Juan Lazcano by unanimous decision.

Preceded by vs. Derrick Parks	Jose Luis Castillo's bouts 5 June 2004	Succeeded by vs. Joel Casamayor
Preceded by vs. Stevie Johnston	Juan Lazcano's bouts 5 June 2004	Succeeded by vs. Marco Angel Pérez

=== Hopkins vs. Allen III ===
Collision Course:Bernard Hopkins vs. Robert Allen III
- Title(s) on the line: WBA, WBC, IBF, and The Ring undisputed middleweight championship

Tale of the tape
Boxer	(United States) Bernard Hopkins	(United States) Robert Allen
Nickname	"The Executioner"	"Armed and Dangerous"
Hometown	Philadelphia, Pennsylvania, U.S.	Atlanta, Georgia, U.S.
Pre-fight record	43–2–1 (1) (31 KO)	36–4 (27 KO)
Age	39 years, 4 months	34 years, 11 months
Height	6 ft 1 in (185 cm)	5 ft 9 1/2 in (177 cm)
Weight	159 lb (72 kg)	160 lb (73 kg)
Style	Orthodox	Southpaw
Recognition	WBA (Unified), WBC, IBF and The Ring; Undisputed Middleweight Champion; The Ring pound-for-pound No. 2 ranked fighter	IBF; No. 1 Ranked Middleweight; WBA; No. 3 Ranked Middleweight; WBC; No. 8 Ranked Middleweight; The Ring; No. 2 Ranked Middleweight

Result
- Hopkins defeated Allen by unanimous decision

Hopkins and Allen had first fought six years earlier in August 1998 when referee Mills Lane pushed Hopkins through the ropes and out of ring injuring his left ankle in the process whilst breaking up a clinch. After being examined by ringside doctor Flip Homansky, it was determined that Hopkins' should not continue and the fight was ruled a no contest, despite Hopkins wanting to continue.

They would fight a rematch in February 1999, with Hopkins stopping Allen in the 7th round.

The day before the bout, Hopkins threatened to pull out of the bout following the appointment of Joe Cortez as referee. Hopkins had Cortez removed from two of his fights previous, against both Felix Trinidad, in the aftermath of Hopkins twice stomping on the Puerto Rican flag, and William Joppy. Hopkins would eventually back down and fight as planned.

=== The fight ===
Allen hit Hopkins with a low blow in the fifth round, prompting Cortez to take a point away. Hopkins scored a knockout in the seventh and would control much the fight.

At the end of 12 rounds, Hopkins would be awarded a wide decision victory with scores of 119–107, 119-107, 117–109.

Preceded by vs. William Joppy	Bernard Hopkins's bouts 5 June 2004	Succeeded by vs. Oscar De La Hoya
Preceded by vs. Steve Walker	Robert Allen's bouts 5 June 2004	Succeeded by vs. Robert Marsh

=== Main Event ===
The fight would go the full 12 rounds with De La Hoya ultimately winning the bout by a close unanimous decision with three scores of 115–113 (the judges having De La Hoya winning seven rounds to Sturm's five). The decision was met with controversy as the Compubox punch stats showed that Sturm had a clear edge over De La Hoya in nearly every category. Sturm would land 234 of his 541 thrown punches for a 43% success rate, and though De La Hoya would throw well over 200 more punches than Sturm, landed only 188 of his 792 for only a 24% success rate. Sturm also dominated De La Hoya with his jab, landing 112 jabs to De La Hoya's 58. De La Hoya narrowly outlanded Sturm in power punches, connecting with 130 of 394 for 33%, however, Sturm still managed to land over half of his power punches going 122 of 235 for 52%. After the bell had sounded, Sturm celebrated, thinking he had done enough to earn the victory. HBO commentators Jim Lampley and Roy Jones Jr. both felt Sturm had clearly won, while unofficial scorer Harold Lederman also had Sturm the winner with the score of 115–113, scoring six of the last seven rounds for Sturm.

== Aftermath ==
Though the winner, De La Hoya expressed disappointment, saying of his performance, "Everything went wrong tonight". Sturm, who felt that De La Hoya had been gifted the decision due to his popularity and to preserve the lucrative De La Hoya–Hopkins fight, said "I know Oscar is a big name here and a great champion, but tonight, I think the whole world saw who was the better fighter." Hopkins, after nearly seeing both the biggest match and payday of his career go down the drain joked that his "blood pressure went up slightly" before the decision was announced.

Using the official punch stats as proof, Sturm launched an official protest shortly after the fight in hopes of overturning the decision. However, Nevada Athletic Commission director Marc Ratner turned down Sturm's protest, stating "Scoring is subjective, so unless someone can prove a mathematical mistake or collusion, there is no basis for a protest."

Despite De La Hoya's less-than-stellar performance, his fight with Hopkins was officially announced two days later. For the first time in his career, De La Hoya came into a fight as the underdog, with Hopkins being a 2–1 favorite. De La Hoya was behind on two of the three scorecards before Hopkins ended the fight with a body shot that put him down for the count in the ninth round.

== Fight card ==
Confirmed bouts:

Weight Class	Weight		vs.		Method	Round	Time	Notes
Middleweight	160 lb.	(United States) Oscar De La Hoya	def.	(Germany) Felix Sturm (c)	UD	12/12		^{Note 1}
Middleweight	160 lb.	(United States) Bernard Hopkins (c)	def.	(United States) Robert Allen	UD	12/12		^{Note 2}
Lightweight	135 lb.	(Mexico) José Luis Castillo	def.	(Mexico) Juan Lazcano	UD	12/12		^{Note 3}

^Note 1 For WBO middleweight title
^Note 2 For WBA (Super), WBC, IBF, The Ring, lineal middleweight titles
^Note 3 For vacant WBC and The Ring lightweight titles

== Broadcasting ==
Country	Broadcaster
Australia	Main Event
Canada	Viewers Choice
Germany	ZDF
United Kingdom	Sky Sports
United States	HBO

Preceded by vs. Ruben Varon	Felix Sturm's bouts 5 June 2004	Succeeded by vs. Robert Frazier
Preceded by vs. Shane Mosley II	Oscar De La Hoya's bouts 5 June 2004	Succeeded by vs. Bernard Hopkins
