= Apolinario =

Apolinario is both a Portuguese and Spanish given name and a surname, derived from the Latin Apollinaris. Notable people with the name include:

== Given names ==
- Apolinario Belisle Gómez (born 1966), Belizean marathon runner
- Apolinario de la Cruz (1815–1841), Filipino religious leader
- Apolinário de Silveira (born 1965), Angolan boxer
- Apolinario Mabini (1864–1903), Filipino revolutionary leader
- Apolinário Paquete (born 1968), Angolan basketball coach

== Middle names ==
- Guillermo Apolinario Vilas (born 1952), Argentine former tennis player
- Joelinton Cassio Apolinário de Lira (born 1996), Brazilian footballer
- Jose Apolinario Lozada (1950–2018), Filipino diplomat and politician
- Manuel Apolinario Odria (1896–1974), the 45th president of Peru
- Valter Apolinario Da Silva (born 1977), Brazilian basketball player

== Surnames ==
- Alejandro Rodríguez Apolinario (1892–1972), Spanish footballer
- Alex Apolinário (1996–2021), Brazilian footballer
- Dave Apolinario (born 1999), Filipino boxer
- Joel Apolinario, founder of Kapa and the culprit of its investment scam

== See also ==
- Apolinario Mabini Shrine (Manila), a historic site in Santa Mesa, Manila, Philippines
- Apolinario Mabini Superhighway, a controlled-access toll expressway in Batangas, Philippines
- Apolinario Saravia, Salta, a town and municipality in Salta Province, Argentina
- BRP Apolinario Mabini (PS-36), a Jacinto-class corvette of the Philippine Navy
- BRP Felix Apolinario (PC-395), a Jose Andrada-class patrol craft of the Philippine Navy
