= Emmanuel Quaye =

Ghanaian boxer

Personal information
- Nationality: Ghanaian
- Born: 19 June 1965 (age 59)

Sport
- Sport: Boxing

Emmanuel Quaye (born 19 June 1965) is a Ghanaian boxer. He competed in the men's light middleweight event at the 1988 Summer Olympics. At the 1988 Summer Olympics, he lost to Segundo Mercado of Ecuador.
