= Julio César Green =

Dominican Republic boxer

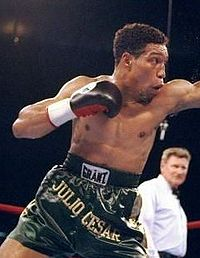

Personal information
- Nationality: Dominican
- Born: May 19, 1967 (age 59) Las Terrenas, Dominican Republic
- Height: 5 ft 10 in (178 cm)
- Weight: Light middleweight; Middleweight; Super middleweight

Boxing career
- Reach: 74 in (188 cm)
- Stance: Orthodox

Boxing record
- Total fights: 34
- Wins: 27
- Win by KO: 19
- Losses: 6
- Draws: 1

Julio Cesar Green (born May 19, 1967, in Las Terrenas) is a Dominican former professional boxer who held the World Boxing Association middleweight title.

== Professional career ==
Green turned pro in 1990 and in 1995, landed a shot at the vacant World Boxing Association (WBA) light middleweight title against Carl Daniels. Green lost a decision, but in 1997, got a shot at WBA middleweight titleholder William Joppy. Green upset Joppy via decision, but lost the title in a rematch against Joppy in his next fight. In 1999, Green got a shot at the interim WBA middleweight title against Darren Obah and won via technical knockout (TKO). He faced Joppy for the full WBA middleweight title later that year and again lost to him. In 2002 he got his last shot at a title, losing via 4th-round TKO against WBA super middleweight titleholder Byron Mitchell. Green retired in 2004.

== Professional boxing record ==
34 fights	27 wins	6 losses
By knockout	19	3
By decision	8	3
Draws	1	

No.	Result	Record	Opponent	Type	Round, time	Date	Location	Notes
34	Win	27–6–1	Filberto Alvarez	TKO	2 (6)	Sep 3, 2004	Club R.P. Acevedo, Santo Domingo, Dominican Republic	
33	Loss	26–6–1	Mikkel Kessler	KO	1 (12)	Mar 13, 2004	Brøndbyhallen, Brondby, Denmark	For WBC International super-middleweight title
32	Win	26–5–1	Roberto Jimenez	KO	1 (?)	Jan 5, 2004	Acropolis Disco, Santiago de los Caballeros, Dominican Republic	
31	Loss	25–5–1	Byron Mitchell	TKO	4 (12)	Jul 27, 2002	Mandalay Bay Events Center, Paradise, Nevada, U.S.	For WBA super-middleweight title
30	Draw	25–4–1	Charles Whittaker	PTS	8	May 12, 2001	Madison Square Garden, New York City, New York, U.S.	
29	Loss	25–4	William Joppy	TKO	7 (12)	Sep 24, 1999	MCI Center, Washington, D.C., U.S.	For WBA middleweight title
28	Win	25–3	Jerry Williams	UD	10	May 15, 1999	Jai Alai Fronton, Miami, Florida, U.S.	
27	Win	24–3	Darren Obah	TKO	9 (12)	Feb 20, 1999	Madison Square Garden, New York City, New York, U.S.	
26	Win	23–3	Joaquin Velasquez	TKO	6 (10)	Aug 28, 1998	Hilton Hotel, Winchester, Nevada, U.S.	
25	Loss	22–3	William Joppy	UD	12	Jan 31, 1998	Ice Palace, Tampa, Florida, U.S.	Lost WBA middleweight title
24	Win	22–2	William Joppy	UD	12	Aug 23, 1997	Madison Square Garden, New York City, New York, U.S.	Won WBA middleweight title
23	Win	21–2	Earl Allen	TKO	9 (10)	Jun 21, 1997	Sun Dome, Tampa, Florida, U.S.	
22	Win	20–2	Bernice Barber	KO	4 (8)	Mar 29, 1997	Hilton Hotel, Winchester, Nevada, U.S.	
21	Loss	19–2	Carl Daniels	UD	12	Jun 16, 1995	Palais des Sports de Gerland, Lyon, Rhône, France	For vacant WBA super welterweight title
20	Win	19–1	Bill Bradley	TKO	1 (10)	Jan 28, 1995	Ballys Park Place, Atlantic City, New Jersey, U.S.	
19	Win	18–1	Kevin Tillman	TKO	5 (10)	Jun 12, 1994	Trump Plaza Hotel and Casino, Atlantic City, New Jersey, U.S.	
18	Win	17–1	Lonnie Beasley	TKO	12 (12)	Apr 19, 1994	Caesars Palace, Paradise, Nevada, U.S.	
17	Win	16–1	Matthew Charleston	TKO	1 (10)	Feb 12, 1994	Cervantes Center, Saint Louis, Missouri, U.S.	
16	Win	15–1	Wayne Powell	TKO	7 (12)	Oct 23, 1993	Sands Casino Hotel, Atlantic City, New Jersey, U.S.	
15	Win	14–1	James Gatlin	TKO	1 (10)	Oct 1, 1993	Hotel Pennsylvania, New York City, New York, U.S.	
14	Win	13–1	Ricky Thomas	TKO	5 (10)	Jul 8, 1993	Paramount Theatre, New York City, New York, U.S.	
13	Win	12–1	Eric Holland	UD	10	Feb 18, 1993	Paramount Theatre, New York City, New York, U.S.	
12	Win	11–1	Willie Douglas	TKO	8 (10)	Nov 20, 1992	Ramada Hotel, New York City, New York, U.S.	
11	Win	10–1	Oscar Noriega	TKO	2 (8)	Oct 15, 1992	Paramount Theatre, New York City, New York, U.S.	
10	Win	9–1	William Bo James	MD	8	Sep 17, 1992	Paramount Theatre, New York City, New York, U.S.	
9	Win	8–1	Kevin Prather	MD	6	Jul 24, 1992	Friar Tuck Inn, Catskill, New York, U.S.	
8	Win	7–1	Kilpatrick Mitchell	PTS	6	Jul 16, 1992	Taj Majal Hotel & Casino, Atlantic City, New Jersey, U.S.	
7	Win	6–1	Ron Woodley	UD	6	Feb 18, 1992	Paramount Theatre, New York City, New York, U.S.	
6	Win	5–1	Aureliano Sosa	KO	1 (6)	Jan 10, 1992	Paramount Theatre, New York City, New York, U.S.	
5	Loss	4–1	Kevin Tillman	PTS	6	Sep 27, 1991	The Blue Horizon, Philadelphia, Pennsylvania, U.S.	
4	Win	4–0	Ricky Rucker	KO	3 (4)	Feb 9, 1991	Meadowlands Convention Center, Secaucus, New Jersey, U.S.	
3	Win	3–0	Garfield McKenzie	TKO	1 (?)	Feb 9, 1991	Madison Square Garden, New York City, New York, U.S.	
2	Win	2–0	Drew Hayes	PTS	4	Jan 19, 1991	Convention Center, Atlantic City, New Jersey, U.S.	
1	Win	1–0	Bill Robinson	TKO	2 (?)	Oct 30, 1990	Pines Hotel, South Fallsburg, New York, U.S.	

== See also ==
- List of world middleweight boxing champions

Sporting positions
Regional boxing titles
Preceded by Wayne Powell	NABF super welterweight champion October 23, 1993 – 1994; Vacated	Vacant Title next held by Winky Wright
World boxing titles
Preceded by William Joppy	WBA middleweight champion August 23, 1997 – January 31, 1998	Succeeded by William Joppy
New title	WBA middleweight champion Interim title February 20, 1999 – September 24, 1999; Lost bid for full title	Vacant Title next held by Gennady Golovkin
