= Quinn Paynter =

Bermudian boxer (born 1961)

Personal information
- Nationality: Bermudian
- Born: 19 August 1961 (age 64)

Sport
- Sport: Boxing

Quinn Paynter (born 19 August 1961) is a Bermudian boxer. He competed in the men's light middleweight event at the 1988 Summer Olympics.
