= Juan Carlos Lemus =

Cuban boxer (born 1966)

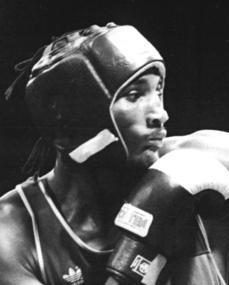
- Juan Carlos Lemus at the 1989 World Amateur Boxing Championships in Moscow

Personal information
- Full name: Juan Carlos Lemus García
- Nationality: Cuba
- Born: May 6, 1966 (age 60)
- Height: 1.82 m (6 ft 0 in)
- Weight: 71 kg (157 lb)

Sport
- Sport: Boxing
- Weight class: Light Middleweight
Medal record
Olympic Games
Gold medal – first place	1992 Barcelona	Light Middleweight
World Amateur Championships
Gold medal – first place	1991 Sydney	Light Middleweight
Pan American Games
Gold medal – first place	1987 Indianapolis	Welterweight
Gold medal – first place	1991 Havana	Light Middleweight
Central American and Caribbean Games
Gold medal – first place	1993 Ponce	Light Middleweight
Goodwill Games
Silver medal – second place	1994 Saint Petersburg	Light Middleweight

Juan Carlos Lemus Garcia (born May 6, 1966) is a Cuban boxer, who won the gold medal in the men's Light Middleweight (71 kg) category at the 1992 Summer Olympics in Barcelona. Lemus also was awarded the gold medal at the 1987 Pan American Games, as well as the World Amateur Boxing Championships in 1991, beating the reigning champion at that time, Israel Akopkochyan.

== Olympic results ==
- Defeated Arkadiy Topayev (Unified Team) 11–0
- Defeated Markus Beyer (Germany) RSCH 1 (0:44)
- Defeated Igors Saplavskis (Latvia) 12–2
- Defeated György Mizsei (Hungary) 10–2
- Defeated Orhan Delibaş (Netherlands) 6–1

Boxan gold medal Pre-olympics Barcelona 1992 and best boxer of the tournament also, with Oscar De La Hoya.
