= Yevgeny Zaytsev (boxer) =

Soviet boxer

Personal information
- Nationality: Soviet
- Born: 16 February 1965 (age 60); Soviet Union

Sport
- Sport: Boxing

Yevgeny Zaytsev (born 16 February 1965) is a Soviet southpaw boxer. He competed in the men's light middleweight event at the 1988 Summer Olympics.
