= Anthony Hanshaw =

American boxer

Personal information
- Nickname: The Tyger
- Born: Anthony Lavar Hanshaw; March 28, 1978 (age 48) Warren, Ohio, U.S.
- Weight: Light heavyweight

Boxing career
- Stance: Orthodox

Boxing record
- Total fights: 29
- Wins: 23
- Win by KO: 14
- Losses: 4
- Draws: 2
- No contests: 0

Anthony Lavar Hanshaw (born March 28, 1978) is a former professional boxer who competed from 2000 to 2013. As an amateur, he won the 1998 National Golden Gloves at welterweight.

== Personal life ==
Anthony Lavar Hanshaw was born March 28, 1978, in Warren, Ohio. He attended Mansfield Senior High School and graduated in 1996.

Hanshaw lost his father prior to the 2000 Olympic trials following an accident at his work.

== Amateur career ==
Hanshaw won the 1998 welterweight Golden Gloves and was 2000 U.S. National champion at 156 pounds. His final amateur record was 300-22.

== Professional career ==
Hanshaw debuted in professional boxing in 2000 as a super middleweight. Hanshaw fought 11 fights in 2000, earning a "The Ring magazine" feature. Hanshaw fought several contenders in his career such as Kingsley Ikeke, Jean Paul Mendy, Anthony Dirrell and Roy Jones Jr.

Hanshaw had a couple shots at a boxing title when he fought for the vacant IBO super middleweight title against Jean Paul Mendy in 2007 and the IBF light heavyweight title against Roy Jones Jr. the same year. Hanshaw drew against Mendy and lost to Jones Jr. via unanimous decision.

== Professional boxing record ==
29 fights	23 wins	4 losses
By knockout	14	2
By decision	9	2
Draws	2	

No.	Result	Opponent	Type	Round	Date	Location	Notes
29	Loss	Anthony Dirrell	TKO	3 (10) 2:36	July 27, 2013	AT&T Center, San Antonio, Texas, USA	
28	Loss	Farah Ennis	UD	10	June 7, 2013	Little Creek Casino Resort, Shelton, Washington, USA	
27	Draw	Derek Edwards	SD	10	February 16, 2013	Benton Covention Center, Winston-Salem, North Carolina, USA	
26	Win	William Gill	UD	8	December 8, 2012	Benton Covention Center, Winston-Salem, North Carolina, USA	
25	Win	John Michael Terry	UD	6	October 27, 2012	N.C. Music Factory, Charlotte, North Carolina, USA	
24	Loss	Andre Dirrell	TKO	5 (10) 1:13	May 2, 2008	Chumash Casino, Santa Ynez, California, USA	
23	Loss	Roy Jones Jr.	UD	12	July 14, 2007	Mississippi Coast Coliseum, Biloxi Mississippi, USA	for IBC light heavyweight title
22	Draw	Jean Paul Mendy	SD	12	January 5, 2007	DeSoto Civic Center, Southaven, Mississippi	for IBO super middleweight title
21	Win	Laferrell Bunting	TKO	3 (10) 1:58	October 6, 2006	Chumash Casino, Santa Ynez, California, USA	
20	Win	Esteban Camou	UD	10	August 4, 2006	PFTC Sports Center, Las Vegas, Nevada, USA	
19	Win	James North	UD	6	June 17, 2006	FedEx Forum, Memphis Tennessee, USA	
18	Win	Victor Maciel	KO	1 (10) 1:19	July 16, 2004	Memorial Civic Center, Canton, Ohio, USA	
17	Win	Tyrus Armstead	TKO	3 (6) 2:05	May 15, 2004	DePaul Athletic Center, Chicago, Illinois, USA	
16	Win	Yameen I Muhammad	TKO	2 (6) 1:57	April 16, 2004	Gund Arena, Cleveland, Ohio, USA	
15	Win	Etianne Whitaker	UD	10	July 16, 2002	Memorial Civic Center, Canton, Ohio, USA	
14	Win	Dana Rucker	UD	10	February 22, 2002	Schottenstein Center, Columbus, Ohio	
13	Win	Mack Willis	TKO	2 (?)	December 1, 2001	Mountaineer Casino Racetrack and Resort, Chester, West Virginia, USA	
12	Win	Kingsley Ikeke	UD	10	July 20, 2001	Memorial Civic Center, Canton, Ohio, USA	
11	Win	Bertrand Tchandjeu	TKO	1 (8) 1:49	April 21, 2001	Ballys Park Place Hotel Casino, Atlantic City, New Jersey, USA	
10	Win	Jose Spearman	TKO	5 (8) 1:49	February 2, 2001	Celeste Center, Columbus, Ohio USA	
9	Win	Juan Carlos Viloria	UD	8	December 1, 2000	MGM Grand Garden Area, Las Vegas, Nevada, USA	
8	Win	Jeffery Brownfield	KO	1 (6) 2:18	November 10, 2000	Mandalay Bay Resort & Casino, Las Vegas, Nevada, USA	
7	Win	Demetrius Johnson	TKO	1 (6) 2:23	October 20, 2000	The Palace, Auburn Hills, Michigan, USA	
6	Win	Ronald Boddie	UD	6	October 6, 2000	Ballys Park Place Hotel Casino, Atlantic City, New Jersey, USA	
5	Win	Delfino Marin	TKO	1 (4)	September 23, 2000	Packard Music Hall, Warren, Ohio, USA	
4	Win	Eric Howard	TKO	2 (6) 1:36	August 26, 2000	Mandalay Bay Resort & Casino, Las Vegas, Nevada, USA	
3	Win	Emil Williams	TKO	1 (4) 2:59	August 5, 2000	Mohegan Sun Casino, Uncasville, Connecticut, USA	
2	Win	Predrag Cvetanovic	KO	1 (4) 0:53	July 15, 2000	Buchmuller Park, Secaucus, New Jersey, USA	
1	Win	Richard Bingham	TKO	1 (4) 2:11	June 16, 2000	Mandalay Bay Resort & Casino, Las Vegas, Nevada, USA	
