= Park Si-hun =

Korean male boxer (born 1965)

Personal information
- Full name: Park Si-hun
- Born: December 16, 1965 (age 60) Haman County, Gyeongsangnam-do, South Korea

Sport
- Country: South Korea
- Event: Men's boxing
Medal record
Men's boxing
Representing South Korea
Olympic Games
Gold medal – first place	1988 Seoul	Light Middleweight
Asian Amateur Championships
Gold medal – first place	1985 Bangkok	Light Middleweight
Gold medal – first place	1987 Kuwait	Light Middleweight

Park Si-hun (Korean: 박시헌; born December 16, 1965) is a retired South Korean boxer. He won a gold medal in the men's light middleweight category at the 1988 Summer Olympics, being awarded victory over Roy Jones Jr. of the United States even though most observers considered that Jones had clearly won. The result was widely condemned and led to reforms in the way boxing is scored at the Olympics.

== Career ==
Park's first major success came in 1985 when he won the light middleweight gold at the Boxing World Cup, defeating 1985 European Champion Michael Timm and 1984 US national champion Kevin Bryant.

Park competed for South Korea at the 1988 Summer Olympics in Seoul. In Park's quarterfinal bout against Vincenzo Nardiello of Italy, Nardiello easily won the first two rounds, but because Park won the third round by a large margin, he was given the fight. Nardiello then had to be dragged out of the ring, shouting at the judges.

In the finals for the men's light middleweight, Park fought American boxer Roy Jones Jr. Park was named the winner of the bout following a 3–2 decision by the judges. Later, scoring indicated that Jones had landed 86 punches to Park's 32. Jones has said that Park apologized to him afterward. Several journalists made sworn statements that judge Hiouad Larbi of Morocco said after the match that he acknowledged that Jones had won easily but ruled in favor of Park in order to placate the South Korean spectators. Two of the three judges voting for Park were eventually banned from the sport for life.

The Jones-Park incident, along with another highly disputed decision against American Michael Carbajal in the same games, led Olympic organizers to establish a new scoring system for Olympic boxing.

Jones and Park met face to face in May 2023, with the South Korean boxer giving his Olympic gold medal over to Jones as a gesture of justice over the controversy.

== Coaching career ==
After the 1988 Olympics Park retired from boxing without turning professional, saying he felt that if he were to go professional no one would take him seriously over the Olympic controversy. He earned a bachelor's degree in physical education at Kyungnam University and served as a high school physical education teacher in Jinhae, Gyeongsangnam-do until 2001, when he was named an assistant coach of the South Korea national amateur boxing team. He was also named an assistant coach at Pohang Poseidons. Later, he became a head coach of the South Korea Olympic team.

== Results ==
1985 Boxing World Cup
Event	Round	Result	Opponent	Score
Light Middleweight	Quarterfinal	Win	(Puerto Rico) Freddy Sanchez	RSC 2
Light Middleweight	Semifinal	Win	(East Germany) Michael Timm	5-0
Light Middleweight	Final	Win	(United States) Kevin Bryant	4-1

1988 Summer Olympics
Event	Round	Result	Opponent	Score
Light Middleweight	First	bye		
Light Middleweight	Second	Win	(Sudan) Abdullah Ramadan	RSC 2
Light Middleweight	Third	Win	(East Germany) Torsten Schmitz	5-0
Light Middleweight	Quarterfinal	Win	(Italy) Vincenzo Nardiello	3-2
Light Middleweight	Semifinal	Win	(Canada) Ray Downey	5-0
Light Middleweight	Final	Win	(United States) Roy Jones Jr.	3-2
