= Orhan Delibaș =

Turkish boxer

Personal information
- Born: January 28, 1971 (age 55) Kayseri, Turkey
Medal record
Men's Boxing
Representing the Netherlands
Olympic Games
Silver medal – second place	1992 Barcelona	Light Middleweight
European Amateur Championships
Silver medal – second place	1993 Bursa	Light Middleweight
Goodwill Games
Bronze medal – third place	1994 Saint Petersburg	Light Middleweight

Orhan Delibaş (born January 28, 1971) is a retired Turkish-born Dutch boxer. He won the Light Middleweight Silver medal at the 1992 Summer Olympics. A year later, he captured the silver medal once again at the 1993 European Amateur Boxing Championships in Bursa, Turkey. He has a professional record of 25-2

== Amateur Highlights ==
- 1991 competed as a Light-Middleweight at World Championships in Sydney, Australia
  - Lost to Torsten Schmitz (Germany) 14-18
- 1992 captured the silver medal, representing the Netherlands as a Light-Middleweight at the Olympic Games in Barcelona
  - Defeated Ki-Soo Choi (South Korea) 3-0
  - Defeated Chalit Boonsingkarn (Thailand) TKO 2
  - Defeated Raúl Márquez (United States) 16-12
  - Defeated Robin Reid (Great Britain) 8-3
  - Lost to Juan Carlos Lemus (Cuba) 1-6
- 1993 competed as a Light-Middleweight at World Championships in Tampere, Finland
  - Defeated Hee-Joon Kim (South Korea) points
  - Defeated Vahe Kocharian (Armenia) points
  - Lost to Francisc Vastag (Romania) points
- 1993 2nd place as a Light-Middleweight at European Championships in Bursa, Turkey
  - Defeated Mamouka Khoutouashvili (Georgia) DQ 3
  - Defeated R. Sarganessian (Armenia) points
  - Defeated Bert Schenk (Germany) points
  - Lost to Francisc Vastag (Romania) points
- 1994 Light-Middleweight Bronze Medalist at Goodwill Games in St. Petersburg, Russia
  - Defeated Malik Beyleroğlu (Turkey) points
  - Lost to Sergey Karavayev (Russia) points
- 1995 Light-Middleweight Champion at World Military Championships

== Pro career ==
Delibaş began his professional career in 1995, under his nickname The Turkish Delight, and won his first 22 bouts in the middleweight division. His first loss was to contender Mamadou Thiam in a TKO in the 8th round. In 2000, he took on future titlist Roman Karmazin and lost in a TKO 3 after he failed to come out of his corner.
