= Robert Allen (boxer) =

American boxer (born 1969)

Personal information
- Nicknames: Armed and Dangerous
- Nationality: American
- Born: June 7, 1969 (age 57) Houma, Louisiana, U.S.
- Height: 5 ft 9 1/2 in (177 cm)
- Weight: Middleweight

Boxing career
- Reach: 73 in (185 cm)
- Stance: Southpaw

Boxing record
- Total fights: 45
- Wins: 39
- Win by KO: 27
- Losses: 5
- No contests: 1

Robert Allen (born June 7, 1969) is an American former professional boxer from Atlanta, Georgia. He fought three times for the middleweight world championship.

== Early life ==
Robert, the youngest of nine children born to Albert and Janette Allen in Houma, Louisiana, graduated from South Terrebonne High School in 1987. In 1988 he moved to Los Angeles where he struggled to find work, lived in a car and became a part of the "Tent City" community of homeless. He would then join the U.S. Marine Corps where he served between 1988 and 1992.

== Amateur career ==
Allen was a standout as an amateur, becoming the 1992 United States Amateur Light middleweight champion.

== Professional career ==
After missing out on a spot on the 1992 United States Olympic boxing team by losing to Raúl Márquez in the Trials, Allen turned professional in 1993.

Nicknamed Armed & Dangerous he has held several minor titles and fought for the world middleweight title three times against all time great middleweight champion Bernard Hopkins. The first fight ended in a no contest when Hopkins was pushed out of the ring by referee Mills Lane when he was breaking a clinch. In the second fight Hopkins knocked Allen out in the 7th round, while in the third Hopkins would score a wide unanimous decision.

== Personal life ==
A father of four, Allen would work as a trainer at the Paul Murphy Boxing Club in Atlanta, Georgia after retiring.

In 2001, his sister Betty May Allen was shot and killed by her boyfriend Donnie Lee Gray who then shot himself before police would arrest him.

== Professional boxing record ==
45 fights	39 wins	5 losses
By knockout	27	4
By decision	12	1
No contests	1	

Key to abbreviations used for results
DQ	Disqualification	RTD	Corner retirement
KO	Knockout	SD	Split decision / split draw
MD	Majority decision / majority draw	TD	Technical decision / technical draw
NC	No contest	TKO	Technical knockout
PTS	Points decision	UD	Unanimous decision / unanimous draw

Boxing record
No.	Result	Record	Opponent	Type	Round(s)	Time	Date	Location	Notes
45	Win	39–5 (1)	(Mexico) Moises Martinez	UD	4	N/a	18 May 2007	(United States) Club Europe, Doraville, Georgia, U.S.	
44	Win	38–5 (1)	(United States) William Johnson	UD	6	N/a	1 Dec 2006	(United States) Club Europe, Doraville, Georgia, U.S.	
43	Win	37–5 (1)	(United States) Robert Marsh	UD	6	N/a	6 Oct 2006	(United States) Club Europe, Doraville, Georgia, U.S.	
42	Loss	36–5 (1)	(United States) Bernard Hopkins	UD	12	N/a	5 Jun 2004	(United States) MGM Grand Garden Arena, Paradise, Nevada, U.S.	For WBA (Super), WBC, IBF, The Ring & Lineal middleweight titles
41	Win	36–4 (1)	(United States) Steve Walker	KO	1	1:55	8 Nov 2003	(United States) Mandalay Bay Resort & Casino, Paradise, Nevada, U.S.	
40	Win	35–4 (1)	(United States) Jesse Aquino	TKO	8 (10)	?	5 Apr 2003	(United States) Silver Star Casino, Choctaw, Mississippi, U.S.	
39	Win	34–4 (1)	(United States) Kevin Hall	TKO	1 (6)	1:19	25 Jan 2003	(United States) Pechanga Resort & Casino, Temecula, California, U.S.	
38	Win	33–4 (1)	(Panama) Tito Mendoza	TD	6 (12)	?	25 Jul 2002	(United States) Mountaineer Casino, Racetrack and Resort, Chester, West Virginia, U.S.	IBF Middleweight Title Eliminator; Mendoza unable to continue from a borderline low blow.
37	Win	32–4 (1)	(United States) Dwain Williams	UD	12	N/a	8 Feb 2002	(United States) Agua Caliente Casino Resort Spa, Rancho Mirage, California, U.S.	Retained NABF middleweight title
36	Win	31–4 (1)	(United States) Marlon Hayes	TKO	2 (12)	2:48	26 Oct 2001	(United States) Pechanga Resort & Casino, Temecula, California, U.S.	Won vacant NABF & USBA middleweight titles
35	Win	30–4 (1)	(United States) Robert Muhammad	TKO	7	?	20 Jun 2001	(United States) Treasure Chest Casino, Kenner, Louisiana, U.S.	
34	Win	29–4 (1)	(Venezuela) Fermin Chirino	UD	8	N/a	24 Apr 2001	(United States) Civic Center, Houma, Louisiana, U.S.	
33	Win	28–4 (1)	(United States) Jerome Hill	KO	3	?	7 Apr 2001	(United States) Jamestown, Tennessee, U.S.	
32	Win	27–4 (1)	(United States) Ronald Weaver	SD	10	N/a	1 Sep 2000	(United States) Ohkay Casino, San Juan Pueblo, New Mexico, U.S.	
31	Win	26–4 (1)	(United States) Shannon Miller	TKO	3	?	22 Apr 2000	(United States) Atlanta, Georgia, U.S.	
30	Win	25–4 (1)	(United States) Arthur Willis	TKO	2	?	27 Jan 2000	(United States) Atlanta, Georgia, U.S.	
29	Win	24–4 (1)	(United States) Joe Harris	TKO	2	?	15 Jan 2000	(United States) Covington, Tennessee, U.S.	
28	Loss	23–4 (1)	(France) Ali Ennebati	RTD	9 (10)	3:00	24 Jul 1999	Grand Casino de Palm Beach, Cannes, Alpes-Maritimes, France	Corner retirement after 9th round, Allen cited an injury to his left hand.
27	Loss	23–3 (1)	(United States) Bernard Hopkins	TKO	7 (12)	1:18	6 Feb 1999	(United States) Washington Convention Center, Washington, District of Columbia, U.S.	For IBF middleweight title
26	Win	23–2 (1)	(Sudan) Abdullah Ramadan	TKO	1 (12)	2:46	19 Sep 1998	(United States) Georgia Dome, Atlanta, Georgia, U.S.	Won vacant IBF Interim middleweight title
25	NC	22–2 (1)	(United States) Bernard Hopkins	NC	4 (12)	2:57	28 Aug 1998	(United States) Las Vegas Hilton, Winchester, Nevada, U.S.	For IBF middleweight title Ruled a NC after Hopkins was injured when accidentally pushed out of the ring by the referee
24	Win	22–2	(Jamaica) Lloyd Bryan	TKO	3 (12)	2:57	31 Jan 1998	(United States) Ice Palace, Tampa, Florida, U.S.	Won vacant NABA middleweight title
23	Win	21–2	(United States) Jeff Johnson	TKO	4	?	20 Nov 1997	(United States) Doraville, Georgia, U.S.	
22	Win	20–2	(United States) James Mason	KO	2	?	22 Jul 1997	(United States) Nashville, Tennessee, U.S.	
21	Win	19–2	(United States) Andrew Council	UD	12	N/a	19 Apr 1997	(United States) Shreveport Municipal Memorial Auditorium, Shreveport, Louisiana, U.S.	
20	Win	18–2	(United States) Benji Singleton	PTS	12	N/a	31 Jan 1997	(United States) Doraville, Georgia, U.S.	
19	Loss	17–2	(United States) Brian Barbosa	RTD	9 (12)	3:00	11 Aug 1996	(United States) Providence Civic Center, Providence, Rhode Island, U.S.	Lost USBA middleweight title
18	Win	17–1	(Georgia (country)) Teimuraz Kekelidze	KO	3 (12)	?	14 May 1996	(United Kingdom) Goresbrook Leisure Centre, Dagenham, Greater London, UK.	Retained WBC International middleweight title
17	Win	16–1	(United States) Warren Williams	KO	9 (12)	3:00	14 Nov 1995	(United States) Casino Magic, Bay Saint Louis, Mississippi, U.S.	Won vacant USBA middleweight title
16	Win	15–1	(United States) Allen Watts	TKO	4 (6)	?	7 Oct 1995	(United States) Convention Center, Atlantic City, New Jersey, U.S.	
15	Win	14–1	(Mexico) Eduardo Ayala	UD	8	N/a	13 May 1995	(United States) ARCO Arena, Sacramento, California, U.S.	
14	Win	13–1	(Argentina) Ricardo Raul Nunez	TD	4 (12)	?	30 Mar 1995	(United Kingdom) York Hall, Bethnal Green, London, UK	Won vacant WBC International middleweight title Nunez stopped by a low blow but Allen declared winner after scorecards were incorrectly totalled
13	Win	12–1	(United Kingdom) Carlos Christie	KO	2 (8)	2:55	23 Jan 1995	(United Kingdom) York Hall, Bethnal Green, London, UK	
12	Win	11–1	(United Kingdom) Darren Dorrington	TKO	5 (10)	?	22 Nov 1994	(United Kingdom) Whitchurch Sports Centre, Bristol, Avon, UK	
11	Win	10–1	(Kenya) Chris Sande	KO	7 (8)	?	2 Nov 1994	(United States) Warner Center Marriott, Woodland Hills, California, U.S.	
10	Win	9–1	(United Kingdom) Kesem Clayton	TKO	1 (6)	?	24 Sep 1994	(United Kingdom) Wembley Arena, Brent, London, UK	
9	Win	8–1	(Venezuela) Orlando Orozco	UD	8	N/a	27 Aug 1994	(United States) Miami Beach Convention Center, Miami Beach, Florida, U.S.	
8	Win	7–1	(United States) Lloyd Ratalsky	TKO	1	?	21 Jul 1994	(United States) The Roxy, Boston, Massachusetts, U.S.	
7	Win	6–1	(United States) Horace Watterson	KO	4	?	10 Jun 1994	(United States) Show Place Arena, Upper Marlboro, Maryland, U.S.	
6	Win	5–1	(United Kingdom) Russell Washer	TKO	4 (6)	?	23 Feb 1994	(United Kingdom) Town Hall, Watford, Hertfordshire, UK.	
5	Win	4–1	(United States) Earl Jackson	KO	2 (6)	1:49	18 Dec 1993	(United States) Caesars Tahoe, Stateline, Nevada, U.S.	
4	Win	3–1	(United States) Joe Ferrell	KO	1 (4)	?	23 Oct 1993	(United States) Sands Casino Hotel, Atlantic City, New Jersey, U.S.	
3	Win	2–1	(United States) Russ Newton	TKO	2 (4)	0:09	28 Aug 1993	(United States) Civic Center, Bismarck, North Dakota, U.S.	
2	Win	1–1	(United States) David Pearson	TKO	4 (4)	0:25	23 Jul 1993	(United States) Union Hall, Countryside, Illinois, U.S.	
1	Loss	0–1	(United States) Horace Cooper	TKO	4 (4)	?	27 Feb 1993	(United States) Showboat Atlantic City, Atlantic City, New Jersey, U.S.	Professional debut

Sporting positions
Amateur boxing titles
Previous: Raúl Márquez	U.S. Amateur; Light middleweight champion 1992	Next: Wayne Blair
Regional boxing titles
Vacant Title last held by Silvio Branco	WBC International Middleweight Champion; March 30, 1995 – May/Dec 1996	Vacant Title next held by Glenn Catley
Vacant Title last held by Bernard Hopkins	USBA Middleweight Champion; November 14, 1995 – August 11, 1996	Next: Brian Barbosa
New title	NABA Middleweight Champion; January 31, 1998 – August 1998	Vacant Title next held by Jonathan Reid
Vacant Title last held by Tito Mendoza	NABF Middleweight Champion; October 26, 2001 – June 2002	Vacant Title next held by Carl Daniels
Vacant Title last held by Antwun Echols	USBA Middleweight Champion; October 26, 2001 – 2001/2002	Vacant Title next held by Daniel Edouard
World boxing titles
New title	IBF Middleweight Champion; Interim title September 19, 1998 – February 9, 1999; Won full title	Unified by Bernard Hopkins
