= Kabary Salem =

Egyptian boxer (born 1968)

Personal information
- Nickname: Egyptian Magician
- Nationality: Egyptian
- Born: 12 February 1968 (age 58) Cairo, Egypt
- Weight: Super-middleweight

Boxing career

Boxing record
- Total fights: 29
- Wins: 23
- Win by KO: 12
- Losses: 5
- No contests: 1
Medal record
Men's amateur boxing
Representing Egypt
All-Africa Games
Gold medal – first place	1991 Cairo	Light-middleweight

Kabary Salem (Egyptian Arabic: كبارى سالم; born 12 February 1968) is an Egyptian former professional boxer who competed from 1997 to 2005 and challenged for the WBO super-middleweight title in 2004.

In December 2020, he was arrested in Egypt and extradited to the United States for the murder of his daughter in Staten Island, New York, in October 2019.

== Amateur career ==
Salem won a gold medal in the light-middleweight division at the 1991 All-Africa Games. He competed at the 1992 Summer Olympics and the 1996 Summer Olympics. He lost in the first round of the light middleweight tournament at the 1992 Olympics to Leonidas Maleckis and in the first round of the middleweight tournament at the 1996 Olympics to Ariel Hernández, en route to the latter's successful defense of his gold medal.

== Professional career ==
Salem is regarded as one of the dirtiest fighters of all time for his persistent headbutts, particularly in his bouts against Randie Carver (resulting in Carver's death), Mario Veit and Joe Calzaghe.

== Professional boxing record ==
29 fights	23 wins	5 losses
By knockout	12	1
By decision	11	4
No contests	1	

No.	Result	Record	Opponent	Type	Round, time	Date	Location	Notes
29	Loss	23–5 (1)	(Romania) Lucian Bute	TKO	8 (12), 3:00	16 Sep 2005	Bell Centre, Montreal, Quebec, Canada	For vacant WBC Continental Americas and NABF super-middleweight titles
28	Loss	23–4 (1)	(Wales) Joe Calzaghe	UD	12	22 Oct 2004	Royal Highland Showground, Edinburgh, Scotland	For WBO super-middleweight title
27	Loss	23–3 (1)	(Germany) Mario Veit	SD	12	8 May 2004	Arena Westfalenhalle, Dortmund, Germany	For WBO interim super-middleweight title
26	NC	23–2 (1)	(Denmark) Rudy Markussen	ND	1 (12), 2:10	13 Mar 2004	Hallen, Brøndby, Denmark	WBO Inter-Continental super-middleweight title at stake; NC after Markussen cut from accidental head clash
25	Win	23–2	(United States) Kenny Bowman	TKO	1 (12), 0:25	23 Oct 2003	Princess Chateau, Lodi, New Jersey, U.S.	
24	Win	22–2	(United States) Derrick Whitley	SD	10	19 Jun 2003	Michael's Eighth Avenue, Glen Burnie, Maryland, U.S.	
23	Win	21–2	(United States) Ray Berry	TKO	10 (12), 0:10	5 Apr 2003	Sovereign Center, Trenton, New Jersey, U.S.	Retained WBO-NABO super-middleweight title
22	Win	20–2	(Cameroon) Manu Ntoh	UD	12	9 Jan 2003	Zembo Shrine Building, Harrisburg, Pennsylvania, U.S.	Won vacant WBO-NABO super-middleweight title
21	Win	19–2	(United States) Tyrone Glover	UD	10	27 Sep 2002	Fraternal Order of Eagles, Fairless Hills, Pennsylvania, U.S.	
20	Win	18–2	(Jamaica) Lloyd Bryan	UD	6	6 Sep 2002	High School, Chambersburg, Pennsylvania, U.S.	
19	Win	17–2	(United States) Robert Marsh	UD	6	15 Jun 2002	High School, Chambersburg, Pennsylvania, U.S.	
18	Loss	16–2	(United States) Antwun Echols	UD	12	9 Apr 2002	Ramada Inn, Rosemont, Illinois, U.S.	For vacant NABF super-middleweight title
17	Win	16–1	(United States) Troy Barnes	UD	8	25 Jan 2002	Trevose, Pennsylvania, U.S.	
16	Win	15–1	(United States) Andre Sherrod	KO	1	9 Nov 2000	Days Inn, Allentown, Pennsylvania, U.S.	
15	Win	14–1	(United States) Fabian Garcia	UD	6	23 Sep 2000	Days Inn, Allentown, Pennsylvania, U.S.	
14	Win	13–1	(United States) Andre Haddock	TKO	2	25 May 2000	Days Inn, Allentown, Pennsylvania, U.S.	
13	Win	12–1	(United States) Randie Carver	TKO	10 (12), 2:05	12 Sep 1999	Harrah's Casino, Kansas City, Missouri, U.S.	Won vacant NABF super-middleweight title
12	Win	11–1	(United States) Steve Detar	UD	6	9 Apr 1999	Foxwoods Resort Casino, Ledyard, Connecticut, U.S.	
11	Win	10–1	(Ghana) Joseph Laryea	UD	10	26 Feb 1999	Foxwoods Resort Casino, Ledyard, Connecticut, U.S.	
10	Win	9–1	(United States) Derrick Whitley	UD	6	25 Nov 1998	Rhodes-on-the Pawtuxet, Cranston, Rhode Island, U.S.	
9	Win	8–1	(United States) Jaime Velasquez	TKO	1	26 Jul 1998	Foxwoods Resort Casino, Ledyard, Connecticut, U.S.	
8	Win	7–1	(United States) John James	TKO	5 (6)	27 Mar 1998	Theatre at Westbury, Westbury, New York, U.S.	
7	Win	6–1	(United States) Malcolm Brooks	TKO	1 (6)	24 Jan 1998	Elks Lodge, Queens, New York, U.S.	
6	Loss	5–1	(United States) Eric Harding	UD	6	29 Aug 1997	City Center, Saratoga Springs, New York, U.S.	
5	Win	5–0	(Jamaica) Richard Grant	TKO	3	13 Jul 1997	Yonkers Raceway, Yonkers, New York, U.S.	
4	Win	4–0	(United States) Derrick Whitley	UD	4	15 Jun 1997	Foxwoods Resort Casino, Ledyard, Connecticut, U.S.	
3	Win	3–0	(United States) Andre Waddell	KO	2	29 Apr 1997	The Blue Horizon, Philadelphia, Pennsylvania, U.S.	
2	Win	2–0	(United States) Kevin Fulton	KO	1	30 Mar 1997	Mohegan Sun, Uncasville, Connecticut, U.S.	
1	Win	1–0	(United States) Jamel Bervine	KO	2	31 Jan 1997	Yonkers Raceway, Yonkers, New York, U.S.	
