= Johnny de Lima =

Danish boxer

Personal information
- Nationality: Danish
- Born: 21 July 1964 (age 61) Vorup, Denmark

Sport
- Sport: Boxing

Johnny de Lima (born 21 July 1964) is a Danish boxer. He competed in the men's light middleweight event at the 1988 Summer Olympics.
