= Joseph Marwa (boxer) =

Tanzanian boxer (born 1964)

Personal information
- Full name: Joseph Marwa
- Nickname: The Hungry Lion
- Nationality: Tanzania
- Born: 15 July 1964 (age 61) Musoma, Tanzania
- Height: 1.78 m (5 ft 10 in)
- Weight: 67 kg (148 lb)

Sport
- Sport: Boxing
- Weight class: Welterweight, Light-middleweight
Medal record
Men's amateur boxing
Representing Tanzania
All-Africa Games
Silver medal – second place	1991 Cairo	Light-middleweight

Joseph Marwa (born 15 July 1964 in Musoma) is a retired male boxer from Tanzania, who represented his native East African country in two consecutive Summer Olympics, starting in 1988 (Seoul). Nicknamed The Hungry Lion he also competed at the 1990 Commonwealth Games. Marwa won a silver medal in the light-middleweight division at the 1991 All-Africa Games, losing in the final to Kabary Salem of Egypt. Joseph Marwa is currently situated in Zanzibar, Tanzania and works as the head bouncer of a hotel, Kendwa Rocks in Kendwa.
