= François Mayo =

Cameroonian boxer (born 1967)

Personal information
- Nationality: Cameroonian
- Born: 29 March 1967 (age 57)

Sport
- Sport: Boxing

François Mayo (born 29 March 1967) is a Cameroonian boxer. He competed in the men's light middleweight event at the 1988 Summer Olympics.
