= Rey Rivera =

Puerto Rican boxer (born 1965)

Personal information
- Full name: Reynaldo Rivera
- Nationality: Puerto Rican
- Born: 14 December 1965 (age 60)

Sport
- Sport: Boxing
Medal record
Men's amateur boxing
Representing Puerto Rico
Pan American Games
Bronze medal – third place	1987 Indianapolis	Welterweight

Rey Rivera (born 14 December 1965) is a Puerto Rican boxer. He competed in the men's light middleweight event at the 1988 Summer Olympics.
