= Miguel Jiménez (boxer) =

Puerto Rican boxer (born 1970)

Personal information
- Full name: Miguel Ángel Jiménez Cedres
- Nickname: The Russian
- Nationality: Puerto Rico
- Born: June 18, 1970 (age 56) Philadelphia, Pennsylvania
- Height: 5 ft 11 in (180 cm)
- Weight: 168

Sport
- Sport: Boxing
- Weight class: Light-Middleweight
- Club: Arecibo Boxing club
Medal record
Pan American Games
Silver medal – second place	1991 Havana	Light-Middleweight

Miguel Ángel Jiménez Cedres (born June 18, 1970) is a retired male boxer from Puerto Rico.

He won the silver medal in the men's light-middleweight (– 71 kg) category at the 1991 Pan American Games in Havana, Cuba. In the final, Jiménez was defeated by Cuba's Juan Carlos Lemus. He also represented his native country at the 1992 Summer Olympics in Barcelona, Spain, falling in the first round to Iraqi Furas Hashim.
