= Peter Silva =

Brazilian boxer

Personal information
- Born: 29 June 1964 (age 61) São Paulo, Brazil

Sport
- Sport: Boxing

Peter Silva (born 29 June 1964) is a Brazilian boxer. He competed in the men's light middleweight event at the 1988 Summer Olympics.
