= Randie Carver =

American boxer

Personal information
- Nationality: (United States) American
- Born: Randie Delmont Carver; December 3, 1974 Kansas City, MO, U.S.
- Died: September 14, 1999 (aged 24) Kansas City, MO, U.S.
- Weight: Super middleweight

Boxing career
- Stance: Southpaw

Boxing record
- Total fights: 25
- Wins: 23
- Win by KO: 14
- Losses: 1
- Draws: 1
- No contests: 0

Randie Carver (December 3, 1974 – September 14, 1999) was an American professional boxer from Kansas City, Missouri.

== Amateur career ==
Carver had an outstanding amateur career, winning the 1993 National Golden Gloves Light middleweight championship.

== Death ==
In the fight against Kabary Salem in September 1999, Carver was headbutted repeatedly during the early rounds in a foul filled bout, which under the rules of boxing is an automatic end of contest either as a disqualification if intentional, or technical decision if the contest reached official status if deemed accidental. He was knocked down in the 10th round and tried unsuccessfully four times to get to his feet. He then lost consciousness and was rushed to the hospital. Carver died two days later from blunt head trauma received during the fight.
