= Mohamad Orungi =

Kenyan boxer (born 1962)

Personal information
- Nationality: Kenyan
- Born: 26 November 1962 (age 62)

Sport
- Sport: Boxing

Mohamad Orungi (born 26 November 1962) is a Kenyan boxer. He competed in the men's light middleweight event at the 1988 Summer Olympics.
