= Michal Franek =

Slovak boxer

Personal information
- Nationality: Slovak
- Born: 18 January 1967 (age 59) Žilina, Czechoslovakia

Sport
- Sport: Boxing
Medal record
Men's boxing
Representing Czechoslovakia
European Amateur Championships
Silver medal – second place	1989 Athens	Middleweight
Silver medal – second place	1991 Gothenburg	Middleweight

Michal Franek (born 18 January 1967) is a Slovak boxer. He competed at the 1988 Summer Olympics and the 1992 Summer Olympics.
