= Angel Stoyanov (boxer) =

Bulgarian boxer (born 1967)

Personal information
- Full name: Angel Metodiev Stoyanov
- Born: January 28, 1967 (age 59) Sofia, Bulgaria
Medal record
Men's Boxing
Representing Bulgaria
European Amateur Championships
Bronze medal – third place	1987 Turin	Welterweight

Angel Metodiev Stoyanov (Bulgarian: Ангел Методиев Стоянов; born January 28, 1967, in Sofia) is a retired boxer from Bulgaria, who competed for his native country at the 1988 Summer Olympics in Seoul, South Korea. There he was defeated in the second round of the Men's Light Middleweight Division (– 71 kg) by East Germany's Torsten Schmitz.
