= Leonidas Maleckis =

Lithuanian boxer (born 1966)

Personal information
- Nationality: Lithuanian
- Born: 8 March 1966 (age 59) Vilnius, Lithuanian SSR, Soviet Union

Sport
- Sport: Boxing

Leonidas Maleckis (born 8 March 1966) is a Lithuanian boxer. He competed in the men's light middleweight event at the 1992 Summer Olympics.
