= Garth Felix =

Grenadian boxer (born 1966)

Personal information
- Full name: Garth Felix
- Born: December 8, 1966 (age 59)
- Height: 1.75 m (5 ft 9 in)
- Weight: 71 kg (157 lb)

Sport
- Country: Grenada
- Sport: Boxing

Garth Felix (born December 8, 1966) is retired boxer from Grenada, who fought at the 1988 Summer Olympics in the men's light middleweight division. He also represented Grenada at the 1987 Pan American Games.

== 1988 Olympic results ==
Below is the record of Garth Felix, a Grenadian light middleweight boxer who competed at the 1988 Seoul Olympics:

- Round of 64: lost to Nobert Nieroba (West Germany) by first-round knockout
