= Igors Šaplavskis =

Latvian boxer (born 1968)

Personal information
- Nationality: Latvian
- Born: 21 January 1968 (age 57) Jelgava, Latvia

Sport
- Sport: Boxing

Igors Šaplavskis (born 21 January 1968) is a Latvian boxer. He competed in the men's light middleweight event at the 1992 Summer Olympics.
