= M'tendere Makalamba =

Malawian boxer (born 1966)

M'tendere Makalamba (2 April 1966 – before 2003) was a Malawian light-middleweight boxer. He competed at the 1988 Summer Olympics, where he finished in seventeenth place. He also represented Malawi at the 1990 Commonwealth Games, losing his opening bout to Michael Bell of New Zealand in the middleweight category.

He died before 2003.

== 1988 Olympic results ==
Below is the record of M'tendere Makalamba, a Malawian light middleweight boxer who competed at the 1988 Seoul Olympics:

- Round of 64: bye
- Round of 32: lost to Roy Jones Jr. (United States) by first-round knockout
