= Fabrizio De Chiara =

Italian boxer

Personal information
- Nationality: Italian
- Born: 14 November 1971; Cologno Monzese, Italy
- Died: 17 November 1996 (aged 25); Avenza, Italy

Sport
- Sport: Boxing

Fabrizio De Chiara (14 November 1971 – 17 November 1996) was an Italian boxer. He competed in the men's light middleweight event at the 1992 Summer Olympics.
