= Lawrence Chapman =

Australian cricketer

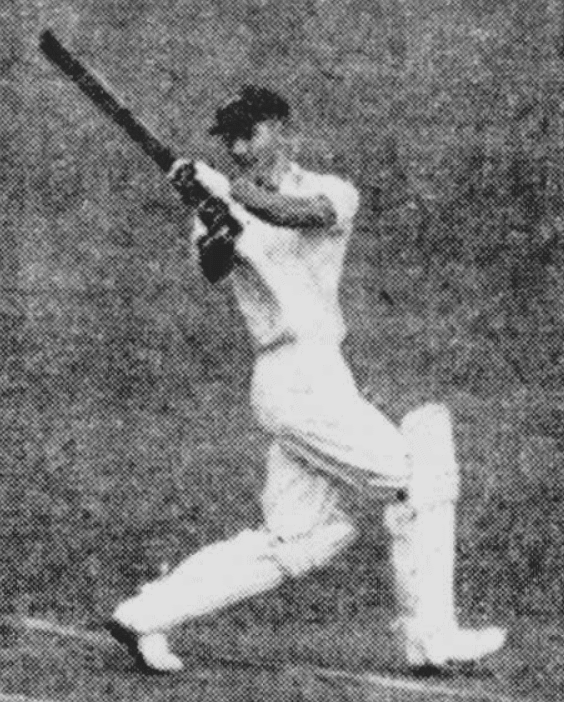

Personal information
- Born: 25 June 1928; Brisbane, Queensland, Australia
- Died: 29 January 2008 (aged 79); Alexandra Hills, Brisbane, Queensland, Australia
- Source: Cricinfo, 1 October 2020

Lawrence Gordon Chapman (25 June 1928 – 29 January 2008) was an Australian cricketer, born in Tingalpa, Brisbane, Australia. He played in seven first-class matches for Queensland between 1949 and 1952.

== Career ==
Chapman was a left-arm opening bowler for Queensland who did well in his first two games, but then struggled to progress. He finished this second game with a career-high 3 for 76, taking three early wickets to reduce Victoria to 3 for 18. Despite having a long run in the following two seasons, he only managed to take two more extremely expensive wickets after taking eight for 21.12 in 1949–50.

== See also ==
- List of Queensland first-class cricketers
