= Arkadiy Topayev =

Kazakhstani boxer (born 1971)

Personal information
- Nationality: Kazakhstani
- Born: 10 August 1971 (age 54) Tomar, Kazakh SSR, Soviet Union

Sport
- Sport: Boxing

Arkadiy Topayev (Аркадий Кемерханович Топаев, born 10 August 1971) is a Kazakhstani boxer. He competed in the men's light middleweight event at the 1992 Summer Olympics.
