= Norbert Nieroba =

German boxer

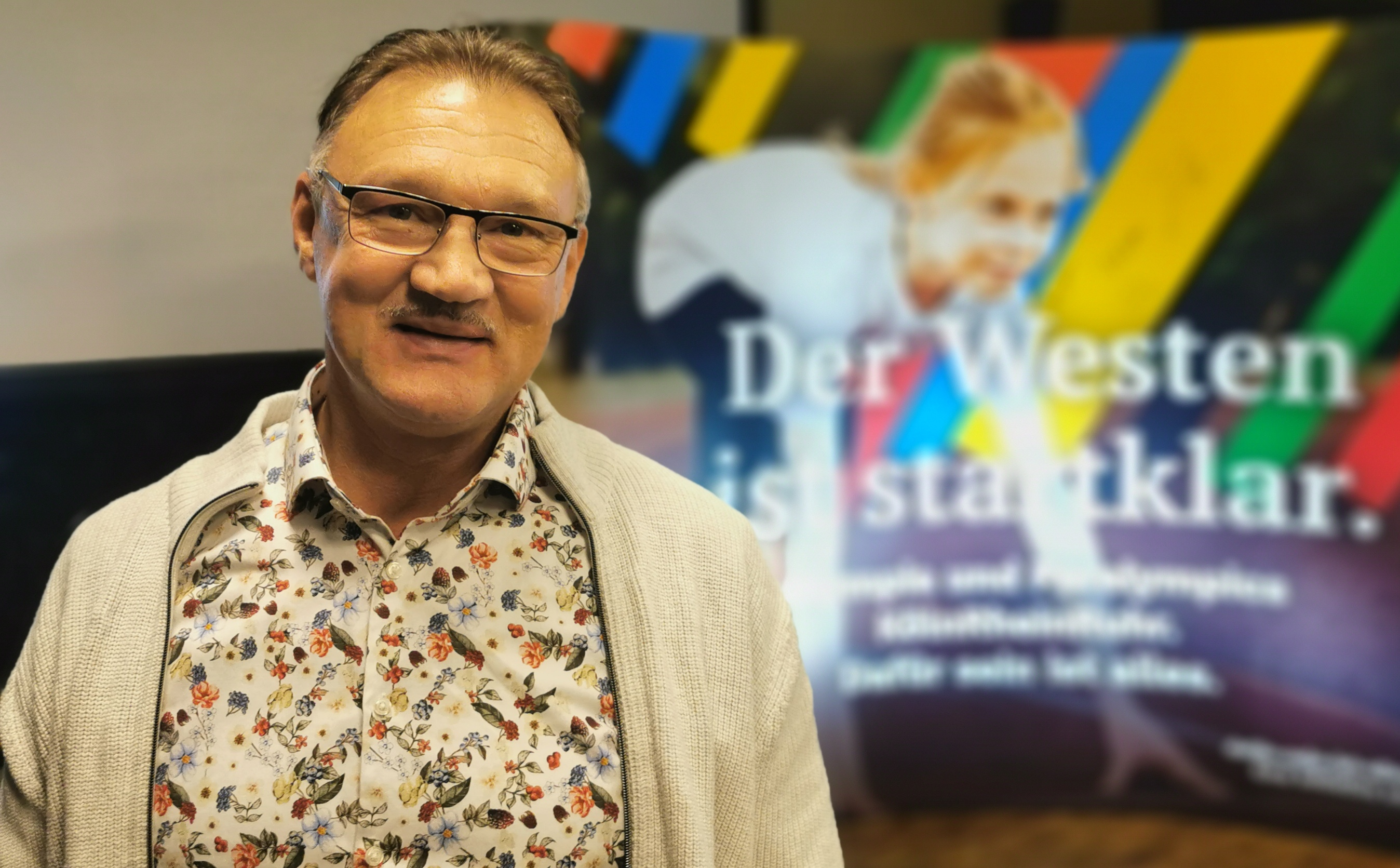
- Norbert Nieroba (2026)

Personal information
- Nationality: German
- Born: 29 April 1964 (age 62) Gelsenkirchen, West Germany

Sport
- Sport: Boxing

Norbert Nieroba (born 29 April 1964) is a German boxer. He competed in the men's light middleweight event at the 1988 Summer Olympics.
