= Chalit Boonsingkarn =

Thai boxer

Chalet Boonsingkarn
Personal information
- Nationality: Thai
- Born: 3 July 1967 (age 57); Thailand
- Height: 173 cm (5 ft 8 in)
- Weight: 60 kg (132 lb)

Sport
- Country: Thailand
- Sport: Boxing

Chalet Boonsingkarn is a Thai Olympic boxer. He represented his country in the light-middleweight division at the 1992 Summer Olympics. He won his first bout against Luca Franca, but lost his second against Orhan Delibaș.
