= Apolinário de Silveira =

Angolan boxer (born 1965)

Personal information
- Nationality: Angolan
- Born: 2 January 1965 (age 60)

Sport
- Sport: Boxing

Apolinário de Silveira (born 2 January 1965) is an Angolan boxer. He competed in the men's light middleweight event at the 1988 Summer Olympics.
