= Furas Hashim =

Iraqi boxer

Firas Hashim Al-Husseini
Personal information
- Nationality: Iraqi
- Born: 21 June 1971 (age 55) Iraq
- Height: 175 cm (5 ft 9 in)
- Weight: 71 kg (157 lb)

Sport
- Country: Iraq
- Sport: Boxing

Furas Hashim is an Iraqi Olympic boxer who trained at Zawraa SC. He represented his country in the light-middleweight division at the 1992 Summer Olympics. He won his first bout against Miguel Jiménez, and then lost his second bout to Maselino Masoe.
