= Abdullah Ramadan =

Sudanese boxer (born 1966)

Personal information
- Nationality: Sudanese
- Born: Abdullah Ramadan Suliman; 11 November 1966 (age 59)
- Height: 6 ft 1 in (185 cm)
- Weight: Cruiserweight; Light heavyweight Super middleweight Middleweight

Boxing career
- Reach: 75 in (191 cm)

Boxing record
- Total fights: 27
- Wins: 15
- Win by KO: 9
- Losses: 12

Abdullah Ramadan Suliman (born 11 November 1966) is a Sudanese boxer.

== Amateur career ==
He competed in the men's light middleweight event at the 1988 Summer Olympics, losing in the second round to Park Si-hun.

== Professional career ==
In 1998, ranked 10th at Middleweight by the IBF, he fought Robert Allen for an "Interim" title, Allen stopped Ramadan in the 1st round.

He would later twice fight for the Canadian Light Heavyweight title.

== Professional boxing record ==
27 fights	15 wins	12 losses
By knockout	9	3
By decision	6	7
By disqualification	0	2

Key to abbreviations used for results
DQ	Disqualification	RTD	Corner retirement
KO	Knockout	SD	Split decision / split draw
MD	Majority decision / majority draw	TD	Technical decision / technical draw
NC	No contest	TKO	Technical knockout
PTS	Points decision	UD	Unanimous decision / unanimous draw

Boxing record
No.	Result	Record	Opponent	Type	Round(s)	Time	Date	Location	Notes
27	Loss	15–12	(Canada) Steve Franjic	DQ	2 (6)	1:25	9 Dec 2011	Shaw Conference Centre, Edmonton, Alberta, Canada	
26	Loss	15–11	(United States) Lionell Thompson	UD	6	N/a	22 Oct 2011	Hershey Centre, Mississauga, Ontario, Canada	
25	Loss	15–10	(Canada) Francy Ntetu	UD	6	N/a	8 Jun 2011	Palais des Sports, Jonquiere, Quebec, Canada	
24	Loss	15–9	(Canada) Junior Moar	DQ	6 (10)	0:38	19 Jun 2009	River Rock Casino, Richmond, British Columbia, Canada	For vacant Canadian Light heavyweight title Ramadan disqualified for low blows.
23	Loss	15–8	(Canada) Jason Naugler	UD	10	N/a	20 Mar 2008	Halifax Forum, Halifax, Nova Scotia, Canada	For Canadian Light heavyweight title
22	Win	15–7	(Canada) Darrell Flint	UD	6	N/a	22 Nov 2007	Chateau Lacombe Hotel, Edmonton, Alberta, Canada	
21	Win	14–7	(Canada) Jacques Lemaire	UD	6	N/a	14 Sep 2007	Tristar Gym, Montreal, Quebec, Canada	
20	Loss	13–7	(United States) Robert Allen	TKO	1 (12)	2:46	19 Sep 1998	(United States) Georgia Dome, Atlanta, Georgia, U.S.	For vacant IBF Interim middleweight title
19	Win	13–6	(United States) Tim Dendy	UD	8	N/a	20 Dec 1997	(United States) Club Grand Slam, Miami, Florida, U.S.	
18	Win	12–6	(United States) Mario Hereford	KO	2	?	28 Oct 1997	(United States) Nashville, Tennessee, U.S.	
17	Win	11–6	(Jamaica) Lloyd Bryan	SD	10	N/a	1 Jul 1997	(United States) Nashville, Tennessee, U.S.	
16	Win	10–6	(United States) John David Jackson	SD	10	N/a	20 Nov 1996	(United States) War Memorial Auditorium, Fort Lauderdale, Florida, U.S.	
15	Loss	9–6	(South Africa) Gary Ballard	SD	6	N/a	7 Sep 1996	(United States) MGM Grand Garden Arena, Paradise, Nevada, U.S.	
14	Loss	9–5	(United States) Antwun Echols	KO	2 (6)	2:23	1 Mar 1995	(United States) War Memorial Auditorium, Fort Lauderdale, Florida, U.S.	
13	Win	9–4	(Puerto Rico) Jesus Carlos Velez	PTS	6	N/a	15 Oct 1994	(United States) Seville Beach Hotel, Miami Beach, Florida, U.S.	
12	Win	8–4	(United States) Kennedy McCullough	TKO	1	?	20 May 1994	(United States) Charlotte Memorial Auditorium, Punta Gorda, Florida, U.S.	
11	Win	7–4	(United States) Charles Daughtry	KO	1	?	2 Nov 1993	(United States) Fairgrounds Arena, Mobile, Alabama, U.S.	
10	Loss	6–4	(Puerto Rico) Javier Rivera	SD	8	N/a	3 Oct 1992	Camuy, Puerto Rico	
9	Win	6–3	(United States) Danny Mitchell	TKO	2	?	26 Jun 1992	(United States) Cleveland State Convocation Centre, Cleveland, Ohio, U.S.	
8	Win	5–3	(United States) Willie Driver	TKO	2 (4)	1:53	28 May 1992	(United States) Sun Dome, Tampa, Florida, U.S.	
7	Loss	4–3	(United States) Moses Lewis	SD	4	N/a	22 Apr 1992	(United States) Meadowlands Arena, East Rutherford, New Jersey, U.S.	
6	Win	4–2	(United States) James Mazzucca	TKO	1	?	14 Jan 1992	(United States) Trump Taj Mahal, Atlantic City, New Jersey, U.S.	
5	Win	3–2	(United States) Harry Daniels	KO	2 (6)	0:29	17 Dec 1991	(United States) Interstate Fairgrounds, Pensacola, Florida, U.S.	
4	Loss	2–2	(United States) Kenny Whack	SD	8	N/a	3 May 1991	Carmen's Banquet Centre, Hamilton, Ontario, Canada	
3	Win	2–1	(United States) Dave Manter	TKO	1 (4)	?	18 Jul 1990	Varsity Arena, Toronto, Ontario, Canada	
2	Win	1–1	(Canada) Everton McEwan	TKO	1 (6)	?	31 May 1990	Hollywood Princess Convention, Vaughan, Ontario, Canada	
1	Loss	0–1	(South Korea) Byung Yong Min	KO	5 (10)	0:21	20 May 1990	Songdo Beach, Incheon, Seoul Capital Area, South Korea	Professional debut
