= Segundo Mercado =

Ecuadorian boxer

Laurensio Segundo Mercado (born 5 January 1967) is a retired male boxer from Ecuador.

Mercado represented Ecuador at the 1988 Summer Olympics, losing on points in the boxing competition to Martin Kitel of Sweden. He turned professional after the games and, fighting as a middleweight, built up a record of 18-2.

On 17 December 1994, Mercado was matched against future undisputed middleweight champion Bernard Hopkins for the vacant IBF middleweight title in Quito, Ecuador. Attempting to become his country's first ever world boxing champion, Mercado knocked Hopkins down twice, but the fight was scored a controversial split draw. They met again four months later, and this time Hopkins won via a seventh round technical knockout.

Mercado moved up to the super-middleweight division after losing to Hopkins, and challenged WBA super-middleweight champion Frankie Liles; Mercado was stopped in five rounds. Mercado continued boxing, but failed to win another fight and retired in 2003 with a final record of 19-10-2.
