= Gary Smikle =

Jamaican boxer (born 1966)

Personal information
- Nationality: Jamaican
- Born: 26 April 1966 (age 60)

Sport
- Sport: Boxing
Medal record
Men's amateur boxing
Representing Jamaica
Pan American Games
Bronze medal – third place	1987 Indianapolis	Light-middleweight

Gary Smikle (born 26 April 1966) is a Jamaican boxer. He competed in the men's light middleweight event at the 1988 Summer Olympics.
