= Lucas França (boxer) =

Brazilian boxer (born 1968)

Personal information
- Born: 16 May 1968 (age 58) São Paulo, Brazil

Sport
- Sport: Boxing
Medal record
Men's amateur boxing
Representing Brazil
Pan American Games
| Bronze medal – third place | 1991 Havana | Light middleweight |

Lucas França (born 16 May 1968) is a Brazilian boxer. He competed in the men's light middleweight event at the 1992 Summer Olympics.
