= Marc Ratner =

Mixed martial arts executive

- Born: Phoenix, Arizona, U.S.
- Education: University of Nevada, Reno: Vice President of Regulatory Affairs, UFC; Former Executive Director, Nevada State Athletic Commission
- Years active: 1985–present
- Spouse: Jody Ratner
- Children: 2
- Awards: International Boxing Hall of Fame; Nevada Boxing Hall of Fame; UFC Hall of Fame

Marc Ratner is an American entrepreneur who is the current Vice President of Regulatory Affairs with the Ultimate Fighting Championship. Formerly, he was the executive director of the Nevada State Athletic Commission.

== Background ==
Ratner was born in Phoenix, Arizona, but grew up in Las Vegas, Nevada. He graduated from University of Nevada, Reno with bachelor's degree in business management.

== Career ==
After graduating, Ratner joined the Nevada Athletic Commission in 1985. He became the Chief Inspector of the Nevada athletic commission in 1987 and executive director in 1992. Ratner left the Nevada Athletic Commission and joined the UFC as its vice president for regulatory affairs on May 15, 2006.

During his tenure in the UFC, Ratner has been active in getting the sport legislated in all of the states in the United States and also abroad.

== Accolades ==
He is a member of the International Boxing Hall of Fame, and was inducted into the Nevada Boxing Hall of Fame in 2012 as part of the organization's inaugural class of inductees. He is also the current commissioner and 50 year member of the Southern Nevada Officials Association.

Mark Ratner became a member of the UFC Hall Of Fame on November 21, 2020.

== Personal life ==
Ratner and his wife Jody have two children.

== See also ==
- Ultimate Fighting Championship
- Frank Fertitta III (Co-owner of Zuffa, LLC)
- Lorenzo Fertitta (Chairman, CEO, & co-owner of Zuffa, LLC)
- Dana White (President of UFC)
- Chuck Liddell (former UFC Vice President of Business Development & former UFC Light-Heavyweight Champion)
