= Noureddine Meziane =

Algerian boxer (born 1962)

Personal information
- Nationality: Algerian
- Born: 28 September 1962 (age 63)

Sport
- Sport: Boxing

Noureddine Meziane (born 28 September 1962) is an Algerian boxer. He competed at the 1988 Summer Olympics and the 1992 Summer Olympics.

== Career ==
- (bronze) Pan Arab Games Casablanca, Morocco 1985
- (gold) Mediterranean Games Latakia, Syria 1987
- (gold) Arab Championships - Amman, Jordan - 1987
- (bronze) African Olympic Qualifier Casablanca, Morocco 1992
- Preliminaries 1/8 World Championships Homebush State Sport Centre, Sydney, Australia 1991

International tournaments

- Preliminaries Golden Belt Tournament August 23 Rink, Bucharest, Romania 1985
- (silver) Trofeo Italia Tournament Venice (Mestre), Italy 1986
- (bronze) International Tournament Sports & Exhibition Hall, Istanbul, Turkey 1986
- (gold) President's Cup Jakarta, Indonesia 1986
- (gold) President's Cup Jakarta, Indonesia 1988
- (gold) Ahmet Comert Tournament - Istanbul, Turkey 1988
