= Raúl Márquez =

American boxer

Personal information
- Nickname: El Diamante
- Nationality: American
- Born: Raúl Márquez; August 28, 1971 (age 54) Valle Hermoso, Tamaulipas, Mexico
- Height: 5 ft 10 1/2 in (179 cm)
- Weight: Light middleweight; Middleweight

Boxing career
- Reach: 74 in (188 cm)
- Stance: Southpaw

Boxing record
- Total fights: 47
- Wins: 41
- Win by KO: 29
- Losses: 4
- Draws: 1
- No contests: 1
Medal record
Representing United States
Men's Amateur boxing
World Amateur Championships
Bronze medal – third place	1989 Moscow	Welterweight
Goodwill Games
Silver medal – second place	1990 Seattle	Light middleweight

Raúl Márquez (born August 28, 1971) is an American former professional boxer who competed from 1992 to 2008. He held IBF junior middleweight title between April and December 1997. Márquez also represented the U.S. at the 1992 Summer Olympics in Barcelona.

== Personal life ==
Márquez resides in Houston and works as a color commentator for Showtime. He is married to Jeannette Marquez. He is a father of four boys and one daughter. Raúl Jr., Arturo, Giovanni, Liam and Alina. His son Giovanni was a top amateur boxer who turned professional in March 2022.

== Amateur career ==
Márquez came to the U.S. in 1976 and began his boxing amateur career. His highlights included:

- 1987 United States Jr. Olympic welterweight champion
- 1989 United States amateur welterweight champion
- 1991 United States amateur light middleweight champion
- 1991 AIBF light middleweight world amateur champion
- Represented the United States at the 1992 Olympics at light middleweight. His results were:
  - Defeated David Defiagbon (Nigeria) 8–7
  - Defeated Rival Cadeau (The Seychelles) 20–3
  - Lost to Orhan Delibaș (Netherlands) 12–16

== Professional career ==
Márquez began his professional career after the 1992 Olympics and got off to an impressive start, winning his first 25 bouts.

=== IBF light middleweight title challenge ===
All those bouts set up a shot at the Vacant IBF Light Middleweight Title against Anthony Stephens. Márquez won by TKO to capture the belt. Raúl successfully defended his title twice, including a victory over Keith Mullings, before getting TKO'd by Mexican legend Yori Boy Campas.

==== Márquez vs. Vargas ====
In 1999, Márquez challenged then-undefeated IBF light middleweight champion Fernando Vargas, but was dominated and stopped in the eleventh round. Márquez took on another elite fighter in 2003, Shane Mosley, in a fight which ended in a bloody no contest after a clash of heads. In 2004, now campaigning at middleweight, Márquez took on the much stronger and then-undefeated Jermain Taylor, who won by TKO after Márquez's corner decided to pull him out in round nine.

=== IBF middleweight title run ===
On June 21, 2008, Márquez defeated Giovanni Lorenzo by unanimous decision in an IBF middleweight title eliminator. The fight took place at the Seminole Hard Rock Hotel and Casino in Hollywood, Florida. Márquez applied pressure, while Lorenzo tried to box from the outside. Márquez's workrate gave Lorenzo problems, for which he often no answer. Márquez was cut over the right eye in round ten, but Lorenzo was docked a point for a headbutt in the same round and the fighters continued to fight after the bell. Scores were 114–113 across the board for Márquez.

On November 8, 2008, at the age of 37, Márquez lost to then-undefeated Arthur Abraham via sixth-round technical knockout at the Bamberg's Jako Arena, in what was the 8th defense of his IBF middleweight title.

== Broadcasting ==
Márquez currently works on the announcing team for Showtime on their Spanish-language broadcasts, as well as the English-language ShoBox: The New Generation series. He has also worked for HBO, NBC, Telefutura and many other networks.

== Professional boxing record ==
47 fights	41 wins	4 losses
By knockout	29	4
By decision	12	0
Draws	1	
No contests	1	

No.	Result	Record	Opponent	Type	Round, time	Date	Location	Notes
47	Loss	41–4–1 (1)	Arthur Abraham	RTD	6 (12)	Nov 8, 2008	Brose Arena, Bamberg, Upper Franconia, Germany	For IBF middleweight title
46	Win	41–3–1 (1)	Giovanni Lorenzo	UD	12	Jun 21, 2008	Hard Rock Live, Hollywood, California, U.S.	
45	Draw	40–3–1 (1)	Bronco McKart	MD	10	Mar 29, 2008	Soaring Eagle Casino, Mount Pleasant, South Carolina, U.S.	
44	Win	40–3 (1)	Jay Pina	TKO	2 (10)	Aug 8, 2007	Hard Rock Live, Hollywood, California, U.S.	
43	Win	39–3 (1)	Jonathan Corn	TKO	1 (10)	Mar 16, 2007	Hard Rock Live, Hollywood, California, U.S.	
42	Win	38–3 (1)	Elco Garcia	KO	7 (10)	Sep 22, 2006	Convention Center, Pasadena, California, U.S.	
41	Win	37–3 (1)	Sergio Rios	TKO	5 (10)	Jul 8, 2006	Coushatta Casino Resort, Kinder, Louisiana, U.S.	
40	Win	36–3 (1)	Miguel Hernandez	TKO	9 (10)	Apr 29, 2006	Coushatta Casino Resort, Kinder, Louisiana, U.S.	
39	Loss	35–3 (1)	Jermain Taylor	RTD	9 (12)	Jun 19, 2004	Home Depot Center, Carson, California, U.S.	
38	Win	35–2 (1)	Humberto Aranda	KO	4 (10)	Oct 23, 2003	Reliant Arena, Houston, Texas	
37	NC	34–2 (1)	Shane Mosley	NC	3 (12)	Feb 8, 2003	Mandalay Bay Events Center, Las Vegas, Nevada, U.S.	
36	Win	34–2	Anthony Brooks	UD	8	Mar 8, 2002	Civic Center, Kissimmee, Florida, U.S.	
35	Win	33–2	Roberto Baro	KO	7 (10)	Aug 23, 2001	Aerial Theater, Houston, Texas, U.S.	
34	Win	32–2	Tony Menefee	TKO	4 (10)	May 18, 2001	La Villa Real Convention Center, McAllen, Texas, U.S.	
33	Win	31–2	Rob Bleakley	TKO	5 (10)	Feb 15, 2001	Aerial Theater, Houston, Texas, U.S.	
32	Loss	30–2	Fernando Vargas	TKO	11 (12)	Jul 17, 1999	Caesars Tahoe, Circus Maximus Showroom, Stateline, Nevada, U.S.	For IBF junior middleweight title
31	Win	30–1	Michael Lerma	UD	10	Mar 19, 1999	Astro Arena, Houston, Texas, U.S.	
30	Win	29–1	Jose Flores	UD	10	Sep 25, 1998	Foxwoods Resort, Mashantucket, Connecticut, U.S.	
29	Loss	28–1	Yori Boy Campas	TKO	8 (12)	Dec 6, 1997	Caesars Hotel & Casino, Atlantic City, New Jersey, U.S.	Lost IBF junior middleweight title
28	Win	28–0	Keith Mullings	SD	12	Sep 13, 1997	Thomas & Mack Center, Las Vegas, Nevada, U.S.	Retained IBF junior middleweight title
27	Win	27–0	Romallis Ellis	TKO	4 (12)	Jul 5, 1997	Isle of Capri Casino, Lake Charles, Louisiana, U.S.	Retained IBF junior middleweight title
26	Win	26–0	Anthony Stephens	TKO	9 (12)	Apr 12, 1997	Tropicana Hotel & Casino, Las Vegas, Nevada, U.S.	Won vacant IBF junior middleweight title
25	Win	25–0	Rafael Williams	RTD	5 (12)	Jan 10, 1997	Mohegan Sun Casino, Uncasville, Connecticut, U.S.	
24	Win	24–0	Scott Smith	KO	2 (10)	Dec 6, 1996	Lawlor Events Center, Reno, Nevada, U.S.	
23	Win	23–0	Skipper Kelp	UD	12	Mar 5, 1996	Scope Arena, Norfolk, Virginia, U.S.	
22	Win	22–0	James McCray	TKO	6 (8)	Jan 30, 1996	Medieval Times, Lyndhurst, Hampshire, England	
21	Win	21–0	Ernie Houser	TKO	4 (8)	Jul 9, 1995	Reno-Sparks Convention Center, Reno, Nevada, U.S.	
20	Win	20–0	Floyd Williams	UD	10	Apr 11, 1995	Bismarck Pavillon, Chicago, Illinois, U.S.	
19	Win	19–0	Alain Bonnamie	UD	10	Jan 10, 1995	Pontchartrain Center, Kenner, Louisiana, U.S.	
18	Win	18–0	Jorge Vaca	UD	10	Nov 5, 1994	MGM Grand Garden Arena, Las Vegas, Nevada, U.S.	
17	Win	17–0	Darryl Cherry	TKO	6 (10)	Oct 1, 1994	Scope Arena, Norfolk, Virginia, U.S.	
16	Win	16–0	Alex Rios	KO	1 (10)	Aug 23, 1994	Cowtown Coliseum, Fort Worth, Texas, U.S.	
15	Win	15–0	Jacobo Garcia	KO	1 (6)	Jul 27, 1994	Tijuana, Mexico	
14	Win	14–0	Patrick Swann	TKO	9 (10)	Apr 16, 1994	Caesars Palace Sports Pavilion, Las Vegas, Nevada, U.S.	
13	Win	13–0	John Jeter	PTS	8	Feb 22, 1994	Arena Theatre, Houston, Texas, U.S.	
12	Win	12–0	Reggie Strickland	TKO	1 (8)	Jan 14, 1994	Carmel High School, Mundelein, Illinois, U.S.	
11	Win	11–0	Eduardo Ayala	PTS	8	Jul 24, 1993	Houston, Texas, U.S.	
10	Win	10–0	Tommy Small	UD	8	Jun 26, 1993	Convention Center, Atlantic City, New Jersey, U.S.	
9	Win	9–0	Mark Allman	TKO	1 (6)	May 28, 1993	Houston, Texas, U.S.	
8	Win	8–0	Jose Angel Garcia	TKO	4 (6)	Mar 23, 1993	HemisFair Arena, San Antonio, Texas, U.S.	
7	Win	7–0	Leo Edwards	TKO	3 (6)	Feb 27, 1993	Showboat Hotel & Casino, Atlantic City, New Jersey, U.S.	
6	Win	6–0	Tyrone Haywood	TKO	1 (6)	Feb 6, 1993	Madison Square Garden, New York City, New York, U.S.	
5	Win	5–0	Andre Brown	TKO	1 (6)	Jan 9, 1993	Houston, Texas, U.S.	
4	Win	4–0	Ivory Teague	TKO	2 (6)	Dec 1, 1992	Pavilion Convention Center, Virginia Beach, U.S.	
3	Win	3–0	Jose Gonzalez	RTD	1 (6)	Nov 13, 1992	Thomas & Mack Center, Las Vegas, Nevada, U.S.	
2	Win	2–0	Andre Watkins	KO	1 (6)	Oct 24, 1992	Cumberland County Civic Center, Portland, Oregon, U.S.	
1	Win	1–0	Rafael Rezzaq	TKO	4 (6)	Oct 3, 1992	HemisFair Arena, San Antonio, Texas, U.S.	

== See also ==
- List of Mexican boxing world champions
- List of light-middleweight boxing champions

Sporting positions
Amateur boxing titles
Previous: Alton Rice	U.S. welterweight champion 1989	Next: Emmett Linton
Previous: Paul Vaden	U.S. junior middleweight champion 1991	Next: Robert Allen
World boxing titles
Vacant Title last held by Terry Norris	IBF junior middleweight champion April 12, 1997 – December 6, 1997	Succeeded by Yori Boy Campas
