= Martin Kitel =

Swedish boxer

Personal information
- Nationality: Swedish
- Born: 24 April 1966 (age 58); Landskrona, Sweden

Sport
- Sport: Boxing

Martin Kitel (born 24 April 1966) is a Swedish boxer. He competed in the men's light middleweight event at the 1988 Summer Olympics.
