= Hendrik Simangunsong =

Indonesian boxer (born 1969)

Personal information
- Nationality: Indonesian
- Born: 11 July 1969 (age 56)

Sport
- Sport: Boxing
Medal record
Men's boxing
Representing Indonesia
Asian Games
Bronze medal – third place	1990 Beijing	Light middleweight
Asian Championships
Gold medal – first place	1992 Bangkok	Light middleweight

Hendrik Simangunsong (born 11 July 1969) is an Indonesian boxer. He competed at the 1992 Summer Olympics and the 1996 Summer Olympics.

Olympic Games
Preceded by Christian Hadinata	Flagbearer for Indonesia; 1996 Atlanta	Succeeded by Rexy Mainaky
