= North American Boxing Association =

Boxing governing body est. 1997

The North American Boxing Association (NABA) is a governing body for boxing, established in 1997. It is affiliated with the World Boxing Association (WBA) and recognizes champions in 17 weight classes.

Its rules specify that fighters' titles are removed if they remain inactive for one year.

== See also ==
- List of boxing organisations
