= Silvio Branco =

Italian boxer (born 1966)

Personal information
- Nicknames: Il Barbaro ("The Barbarian")
- Born: 26 August 1966 (age 60) Civitavecchia, Italy
- Height: 6 ft 0 1/2 in (184 cm)
- Weight: Middleweight; Super middleweight; Light heavyweight; Cruiserweight

Boxing career
- Stance: Orthodox

Boxing record
- Total fights: 77
- Wins: 63
- Win by KO: 37
- Losses: 11
- Draws: 3

Silvio Branco (born 26 August 1966) is an Italian former professional boxer. He held the WBA Light heavyweight title twice between 2003 and 2007.

== Career ==
Branco outpointed Glen Johnson and upset Robin Reid in England. He got a super middleweight IBF title fight but lost a lopsided decision against Sven Ottke.

He defeated Puerto Rican puncher Manny Siaca on Thursday 27 July 2006 to win the WBA interim light-heavyweight championship. When Tiozzo laid down his title on 19 October 2006, Silvio Branco became again the full WBA world champion. He lost this title on 28 April 2007 once more against the Croatian boxer Stipe Drviš.

Branco lost to WBC light heavyweight champion Jean Pascal in Montreal on 25 September 2009.

== Professional boxing record ==
77 fights	63 wins	11 losses
By knockout	37	4
By decision	26	7
Draws	3	

No.	Result	Record	Opponent	Type	Round, time	Date	Location	Notes
77	Win	63–11–3	Juho Haapoja	TD	10 (12)	06/07/2013	Stadio Comunale Fattori, Civitavecchia, Italy	Won vacant WBC Silver cruiserweight title
76	Loss	62–11–3	Giacobbe Fragomeni	UD	12	15/12/2012	PalaGarda, Riva del Garda, Italy	For vacant WBC Silver cruiserweight title
75	Draw	62–10–3	Giacobbe Fragomeni	MD	12	17/03/2012	PalaRavizza, Pavia, Italy	For vacant WBC Silver cruiserweight title
74	Win	62–10–2	Jevgenijs Andrejevs	UD	6	08/07/2011	Piazza XX Settembre, Civitanova Marche, Italy	
73	Win	61–10–2	Vincenzo Rossitto	UD	12	27/11/2010	Palasport, Civitavecchia, Italy	Retained WBC International cruiserweight title
72	Win	60–10–2	Laszlo Hubert	TKO	4 (12)	05/02/2010	PalaTenda, Fuscaldo, Italy	Won vacant WBC International cruiserweight title
71	Loss	59–10–2	Jean Pascal	TKO	10 (12)	25/09/2009	Bell Centre, Montreal, Quebec, Canada	For WBC light-heavyweight title
70	Win	59–9–2	Zoltan Kallai	TKO	4 (6)	20/06/2009	Rome, Italy	
69	Win	58–9–2	Roland Horvath	TKO	3 (8)	10/04/2009	Palasport, Casoria, Italy	
68	Win	57–9–2	Abdelkader Benzinia	UD	6	19/04/2008	Polyvalent Hall, Bucharest, Romania	
67	Win	56–9–2	Peter Venancio	TD	9 (12)	19/10/2007	Estrel Hotel, Berlin, Germany	Won WBC Latino & International light-heavyweight titles
66	Loss	55–9–2	Stipe Drews	UD	12	28/04/2007	König-Pilsener-Arena, Oberhausen, Germany	Lost WBA light-heavyweight title
65	Win	55–8–2	Manny Siaca	UD	12	27/07/2006	Velodromo Vigorelli, Milan, Italy	Won WBA light-heavyweight Interim title
64	Win	54–8–2	Radek Seman	TKO	4 (6)	16/12/2005	PalaLido, Milan, Italy	
63	Win	53–8–2	Drago Janjusevic	TKO	6 (6)	17/06/2005	PalaLido, Milan, Italy	
62	Win	52–8–2	Zoltán Béres	TKO	4 (6)	20/05/2005	Palazzetto dello Sport, Rome, Italy	
61	Win	51–8–2	Sasha Mitreski	TKO	5 (12)	21/12/2004	Palazetto dello Sport, Sabaudia, Italy	Won vacant WBA Inter-Continental light-heavyweight title
60	Win	50–8–2	Ramdane Serdjane	PTS	10	05/10/2004	Teatro Traiano, Civitavecchia, Italy	
59	Loss	49–8–2	Thomas Ulrich	KO	11 (12)	17/07/2004	Stadthalle, Zwickau, Germany	For vacant European light-heavyweight title
58	Loss	49–7–2	Fabrice Tiozzo	MD	12	20/03/2004	Palais des Sports de Gerland, Lyon, France	Lost WBA light-heavyweight (Regular) title
57	Win	49–6–2	Mehdi Sahnoune	TKO	11 (12)	10/10/2003	Palais des Sports, Marseille, France	Won WBA light-heavyweight title
56	Win	48–6–2	Raul Esteban Barreto	TKO	5 (10)	22/07/2003	Piazza Vittoria, Pavia, Italy	
55	Win	47–6–2	Zoltán Béres	TKO	5 (6)	31/05/2003	Civitavecchia, Italy	
54	Loss	46–6–2	Stipe Drews	UD	12	08/02/2003	Estrel Hotel, Berlin, Germany	For vacant European light-heavyweight title
53	Win	46–5–2	Anton Lascek	KO	1 (6)	24/11/2002	Dvorana Mladosti, Rijeka, Croatia	
52	Win	45–5–2	Ramdane Serdjane	PTS	6	13/04/2002	Casinò di Campione, Campione d'Italia, Italy	
51	Win	44–5–2	Juergen Hartenstein	KO	1 (12)	09/02/2002	Civitavecchia, Italy	Won vacant IBF Inter-Continental light-heavyweight title
50	Win	43–5–2	Julien Chamayou	PTS	6	17/11/2001	Civitavecchia, Italy	
49	Win	42–5–2	Yohan Gimenez	PTS	6	20/10/2001	Trieste, Italy	
48	Win	41–5–2	Didier Poujol	KO	1 (6)	28/04/2001	Civitavecchia, Italy	
47	Loss	40–5–2	Sven Ottke	UD	12	16/12/2000	Europahalle, Karlsruhe, Germany	For IBF super-middleweight title
46	Win	40–4–2	Robin Reid	UD	12	24/06/2000	Hampden Park, Glasgow, Scotland	Retained WBU super-middleweight title
45	Win	39–4–2	Glen Johnson	UD	12	15/04/2000	Padua, Italy	Won vacant WBU super-middleweight title
44	Win	38–4–2	Marco Antonio Duarte	UD	6	20/11/1999	Sabaudia, Italy	
43	Win	37–4–2	Patrick Swann	PTS	6	26/06/1999	Benevento, Italy	
42	Win	36–4–2	Anthony Ivory	PTS	8	15/05/1999	Capo d'Orlando, Italy	
41	Loss	35–4–2	Agostino Cardamone	UD	12	27/03/1999	Civitavecchia, Italy	For WBU middleweight title
40	Loss	35–3–2	Agostino Cardamone	KO	10 (12)	18/12/1998	Brindisi, Italy	Lost WBU middleweight title
39	Win	35–2–2	Anthony Andrews	TKO	8 (12)	22/08/1998	Calatafimi-Segesta, Italy	Retained WBU middleweight title
38	Win	34–2–2	Rogerio Cacciatore	UD	12	27/06/1998	Messina, Italy	Retained WBU middleweight title
37	Win	33–2–2	Darren Maciunski	UD	12	17/12/1997	Calatafimi-Segesta, Italy	Retained WBU middleweight title
36	Win	32–2–2	Gustavo Francisco Freda	TKO	6 (12)	28/08/1997	Forte Michelangelo, Civitavecchia, Italy	Retained WBU middleweight title
35	Win	31–2–2	Ricardo Raul Nunez	TKO	10 (12)	12/06/1997	Chico-Mendez Park, Giulianova, Italy	Retained WBU middleweight title
34	Win	30–2–2	Verno Phillips	UD	12	13/02/1997	Palasport, Civitavecchia, Italy	Retained WBU middleweight title
33	Win	29–2–2	Thomas Tate	UD	12	12/09/1996	Palazzo Dello Sport, Civitavecchia, Italy	Won vacant WBU middleweight title
32	Win	28–2–2	Csaba Olah	TKO	4 (?)	08/08/1996	Town Square, San Mango d'Aquino, Italy	
31	Draw	27–2–2	Rodney Toney	SD	12	02/05/1996	Palazzo Dello Sport, Civitavecchia, Italy	For vacant WBU super-middleweight title
30	Win	27–2–1	Jozsef Zoltan Nagy	TKO	1 (8)	20/01/1996	Palazzo Dello Sport, Marsala, Italy	
29	Win	26–2–1	Luis Dionisio Barrera	TKO	12 (12)	30/11/1995	Elcat, Pofi, Italy	Retained IBF Inter-Continental middleweight title
28	Win	25–2–1	Alexander Zaitsev	PTS	12	02/08/1995	Erice, Italy	Won IBF Inter-Continental middleweight title
27	Loss	24–2–1	Richie Woodhall	TKO	9 (12)	22/02/1995	Telford Ice Rink, Telford, England	For vacant European middleweight title
26	Win	24–1–1	Miguel Angel Arroyo	PTS	12	14/10/1994	Club Ramon Santamarina, Tandil, Argentina	Won WBC International middleweight title
25	Win	23–1–1	Ivano Biagi	KO	1 (12)	29/06/1994	Palestra Antonio Armeni, Follonica, Italy	Retained Italian middleweight title
24	Win	22–1–1	Stefano Pompilio	KO	1 (12)	05/03/1994	Palasport, Grosseto, Italy	Retained Italian middleweight title
23	Win	21–1–1	Giovanni De Marco	TKO	3 (12)	29/12/1993	Capo d'Orlando, Italy	Retained Italian middleweight title
22	Win	20–1–1	Luigi De Cicilia	TKO	3 (12)	20/08/1993	Civitavecchia, Italy	Won vacant Italian middleweight title
21	Win	19–1–1	Horace Fleary	PTS	6	16/04/1993	PalaEur, Rome, Italy	
20	Win	18–1–1	Patrice Cord'Homme	PTS	6	20/01/1993	Avoriaz, Morzine, France	
19	Win	17–1–1	Tomas Negro Garcia	KO	1 (?)	25/09/1992	Stadio di Voghera, Voghera, Italy	
18	Loss	16–1–1	Agostino Cardamone	PTS	12	01/02/1992	Civitavecchia, Italy	For vacant Italian middleweight title
17	Win	16–0–1	Larry McCall	KO	1 (?)	21/11/1991	Palazzo Dello Sport, Perugia, Italy	
16	Win	15–0–1	Erich Ecker	KO	2 (?)	05/07/1991	Civitavecchia, Italy	
15	Win	14–0–1	Ian Chantler	KO	2 (8)	15/05/1991	Montichiari, Italy	
14	Win	13–0–1	Ray Webb	PTS	8	27/03/1991	Mestre, Italy	
13	Win	12–0–1	Samuel Isiko	KO	2 (?)	16/11/1990	Piove di Sacco, Italy	
12	Win	11–0–1	Eric Taton	KO	2 (?)	15/10/1990	Milan, Italy	
11	Win	10–0–1	Abdel Bejaoui	KO	3 (?)	25/05/1990	Tunis, Tunisia	
10	Win	9–0–1	Libema Nzua	PTS	6	29/01/1990	Milan, Italy	
9	Draw	8–0–1	Judas Clottey	PTS	8	09/12/1989	Teramo, Italy	
8	Win	8–0	Bechir Chaarane	KO	2 (?)	14/10/1989	Catanzaro, Italy	
7	Win	7–0	Jimmy Gourad	KO	3 (?)	21/07/1989	Tarquinia, Italy	
6	Win	6–0	Young Gully	KO	2 (6)	10/06/1989	Civitavecchia, Italy	
5	Win	5–0	Alfredo Reyes	KO	1 (?)	25/05/1989	Rozzano, Italy	
4	Win	4–0	Patrick Delacourt	KO	1 (?)	14/04/1989	Milan, Italy	
3	Win	3–0	Xhafer Vishaj	PTS	6	30/12/1988	Civitavecchia, Italy	
2	Win	2–0	Piero Spadaccini	KO	6 (?)	15/09/1988	Milan, Italy	
1	Win	1–0	Philip Houthoofdt	KO	5 (?)	14/07/1988	Milan, Italy	

== See also ==
- List of male boxers
- List of world light-heavyweight boxing champions

Sporting positions
Regional boxing titles
Vacant Title last held by Agostino Cardamone	Italian middleweight champion 20 August 1993 – 1996; Vacated	Vacant Title next held by Vincenzo Imparato
Preceded by Miguel Angel Arroyo	WBC International middleweight champion 14 October 1994 – 1995; Vacated	Vacant Title next held by Robert Allen
Preceded by Alexander Zaytsev	IBF Inter-Continental middleweight champion 2 August 1995 – 1995; Vacated	Vacant Title next held by Branko Sobot
Vacant Title last held by Glen Kelly	IBF Inter-Continental light-heavyweight champion 9 February 2002 – 2002; Vacated	Vacant Title next held by Stipe Drews
New title	WBA Inter-Continental light-heavyweight champion 21 December 2004 – 2005; Vacated	Vacant
Preceded by Peter Venancio	WBC Latino light-heavyweight champion 19 October 2007 – 2008; Vacated	Vacant Title next held by Roberto Bolonti
Vacant Title last held by Adrian Diaconu	WBC International light-heavyweight champion 19 October 2007 – 2008; Vacated	Vacant Title next held by Doudou Ngumbu
Vacant Title last held by Herbie Hide	WBC International cruiserweight champion 5 February 2010 – 2011; Vacated	Vacant Title next held by Giacobbe Fragomeni
Vacant Title last held by Giacobbe Fragomeni	WBC Silver cruiserweight champion 6 July 2013 – 2013; Retired	Vacant Title next held by Ilunga Makabu
Minor world boxing titles
Vacant Title last held by Dana Rosenblatt	WBU middleweight champion 12 September 1996 – 18 December 1998	Succeeded by Agostino Cardamone
Vacant Title last held by Nordin ben Salah	WBU super-middleweight champion 15 April 2000 – 2000; Vacated	Vacant Title next held by Eric Teymour
Major world boxing titles
Preceded by Mehdi Sahnoune	WBA light-heavyweight champion 10 October 2003 – 8 November 2003; Status changed	Succeeded by Roy Jones Jr. as Unified champion
Vacant Title last held by Mehdi Sahnoune	WBA light-heavyweight champion Regular title 8 November 2003 – 20 March 2004	Succeeded by Fabrice Tiozzo
Vacant Title last held by Richard Hall	WBA light-heavyweight champion Interim title 27 July 2006 – 19 October 2006; Promoted	Vacant Title next held by Felix Valera
Vacant Title last held by Fabrice Tiozzo	WBA light-heavyweight champion 19 October 2006 –28 April 2007	Succeeded by Stipe Drews
