= Byron Mitchell =

American boxer (born 1973)

Personal information
- Nickname: The Hammer from Bama
- Born: Byron Deangelo-Tarone Mitchell; October 31, 1973 (age 52) Orlando, Florida, U.S.
- Height: 5 ft 11 1/2 in (182 cm)
- Weight: Super middleweight; Light heavyweight; Cruiserweight

Boxing career
- Reach: 71 in (180 cm)
- Stance: Orthodox

Boxing record
- Total fights: 41
- Wins: 29
- Win by KO: 22
- Losses: 11
- Draws: 1

Byron Deangelo-Tarone Mitchell (born October 31, 1973) is an American former professional boxer who fought from 1996 to 2012. He was the Lineal and two-time WBA super middleweight champion, winning the titles in 1999 and 2001.

== Amateur career ==
September 1991 Byron Mitchell first started boxing at Johnny Trawick's Wolfpack Boxing Gym in Ozark, Alabama. Mitchell was the 1996 National Golden Gloves Middleweight Champion

== Professional career ==
He turned professional in 1996 for Don King and won the World Boxing Association and Lineal Super Middleweight titles in 1999 after defeating the southpaw Frankie Liles (32-1) by KO in the 11th round. Later that year, he drew with Bruno Girard and lost the title to Girard the next year. He recaptured the WBA belt the following year by beating Manny Siaca then made defenses against Siaca, in a rematch, and Julio César Green before losing a split decision in a unification bout to Sven Ottke in Germany, 2003.

Later that year he lost to WBO title holder Joe Calzaghe by KO in the 2nd round. He became the first man to floor the Welshman but was later stopped on his feet, he retired after the fight. After more than four years away from the pro game returned to the ring in 2007 to face former interim WBA light-heavyweight champion Richard Hall, he lost via fourth round stoppage.

== Professional boxing record ==
41 fights	29 wins	11 losses
By knockout	22	9
By decision	7	2
Draws	1	

Key to abbreviations used for results
DQ	Disqualification	RTD	Corner retirement
KO	Knockout	SD	Split decision / split draw
MD	Majority decision / majority draw	TD	Technical decision / technical draw
NC	No contest	TKO	Technical knockout
PTS	Points decision	UD	Unanimous decision / unanimous draw

Boxing record
No.	Result	Record	Opponent	Type	Round(s), time	Date	Location	Notes
41	Loss	29–11–1	Michael Seals	TKO	1 (8), 2:42	Dec 8, 2012	The Grand Ballroom, Norcross, Georgia, U.S.	For vacant WBC-USA cruiserweight title
40	Loss	29–10–1	Andrzej Fonfara	TKO	3 (10), 1:03	Mar 16, 2012	UIC Pavilion, Chicago, Illinois, U.S.	
39	Loss	29–9–1	Dawid Kostecki	KO	4 (10), 0:22	Dec 3, 2011	Hilton Warsaw Hotel, Warsaw, Masovian, Poland	For WBA Inter-Continental light-heavyweight title
38	Win	29–8–1	Shannon Miller	KO	2 (6)	Nov 22, 2011	New Daisy Theatre, Memphis, Tennessee, U.S.	
37	Loss	28–8–1	Zsolt Erdei	TKO	6 (10), 1:58	Jun 4, 2011	Boardwalk Hall, Atlantic City, New Jersey, U.S.	
36	Loss	28–7–1	Luis Garcia	TKO	2 (10), 0:51	Nov 6, 2010	University Arena, Limerick, Munster, Ireland	
35	Loss	28–6–1	Otis Griffin	TKO	8 (12), 1:45	May 7, 2010	Oheka Castle, Huntington, New York, U.S.	For vacant USBA light-heavyweight title
34	Win	28–5–1	David Telesco	TKO	2 (8), 2:01	Nov 21, 2009	Hilton Rye Town Hotel, Rye Brook, New York, U.S.	
33	Loss	27–5–1	Beibut Shumenov	TKO	4 (12), 2:58	May 9, 2009	Stadium Khadjimukan, Shymkent, Kazakhstan	For vacant IBA light-heavyweight title
32	Win	27–4–1	Zach Walters	RTD	6 (12), 3:00	Feb 20, 2009	Buffalo Convention Center, Buffalo, New York, U.S.	Won vacant NABA-USA light-heavyweight title
31	Win	26–4–1	Etianne Whitaker	TKO	1 (8), 1:10	Nov 15, 2008	Seneca Niagara Casino & Hotel, Niagara Falls, New York, U.S.	
30	Loss	25–4–1	Richard Hall	TKO	4 (8), 2:15	Nov 21, 2007	Sheraton Miami Mart Hotel, Miami, Florida, U.S.	
29	Loss	25–3–1	Joe Calzaghe	TKO	2 (12), 2:36	Jun 28, 2003	Cardiff International Arena, Cardiff, Wales, U.K.	For WBO super-middleweight title
28	Loss	25–2–1	Sven Ottke	SD	12	Mar 15, 2003	Max-Schmeling-Halle, Pankow, Berlin, Germany	For WBA (Super) & IBF super-middleweight titles
27	Win	25–1–1	Julio César Green	TKO	4 (12), 1:55	Jun 27, 2002	Mandalay Bay Events Center, Paradise, Nevada, U.S.	Retained WBA super-middleweight title
26	Win	24–1–1	Manny Siaca	SD	12	Sep 29, 2001	Madison Square Garden, New York City, New York, U.S.	Retained WBA super-middleweight title
25	Win	23–1–1	Manny Siaca	TKO	12 (12), 2:32	Mar 3, 2001	Mandalay Bay Events Center, Paradise, Nevada, U.S.	Won vacant WBA super-middleweight title
24	Win	22–1–1	Anton Robinson	UD	10	Feb 3, 2001	Mandalay Bay Events Center, Paradise, Nevada, U.S.	
23	Win	21–1–1	Vinson Durham	UD	10	Sep 16, 2000	Ozark Civic Center, Ozark, Alabama, U.S.	
22	Loss	20–1–1	Bruno Girard	UD	12	Apr 8, 2000	Palais Omnisports de Paris-Bercy, Paris, Île-de-France, France	Lost WBA super-middleweight title
21	Draw	20–0–1	Bruno Girard	SD	12	Dec 11, 1999	Grand Casino, Tunica Resorts, Mississippi, U.S.	Retained WBA super-middleweight title
20	Win	20–0	Frankie Liles	TKO	11 (12), 1:17	Jun 12, 1999	Shriners Auditorium, Wilmington, Massachusetts, U.S.	Won WBA super-middleweight title
19	Win	19–0	Carlos Sanabria	KO	3 (10)	Mar 6, 1999	UM Sports Pavilion, Minneapolis, Minnesota, U.S.	
18	Win	18–0	Michael Gordon	TKO	1 (6), 2:59	Aug 28, 1998	Hilton Hotel, Winchester, Nevada, U.S.	
17	Win	17–0	Adam Garland	TKO	1 (10)	May 30, 1998	Hilton Hotel, Winchester, Nevada, U.S.	
16	Win	16–0	Arthur Willis	KO	1 (8), 1:03	Jan 31, 1998	The Moon, Tallahassee, Florida, U.S.	
15	Win	15–0	Guy Stanford	TKO	1 (?)	Dec 13, 1997	Amphitheater, Pompano Beach, Florida, U.S.	
14	Win	14–0	Octavian Stoica	PTS	8	Oct 14, 1997	Palais des Sports, Marseille, Bouches-du-Rhône, France	
13	Win	13–0	Charles Towns	KO	2 (8)	Sep 11, 1997	The Moon, Tallahassee, Florida, U.S.	
12	Win	12–0	Orlando Wiet	PTS	8	Jul 8, 1997	Palais des Sports, Marseille, Bouches-du-Rhône, France	
11	Win	11–0	Arthur Willis	KO	7 (8)	May 31, 1997	The Moon, Tallahassee, Florida, U.S.	
10	Win	10–0	Guy Stanford	TKO	1 (?)	Apr 19, 1997	Memorial Auditorium, Shreveport, Louisiana, U.S.	
9	Win	9–0	Zaurbek Khetagurov	UD	6	Apr 1, 1997	Palais des Sports, Marseille, Bouches-du-Rhône, France	
8	Win	8–0	Joe Potts	TKO	1 (6)	Feb 22, 1997	The Theatre, Fort Lauderdale, Florida, U.S.	
7	Win	7–0	Leon Shavers	KO	1 (4)	Nov 30, 1996	Latin Club, Sterling, Illinois, U.S.	
6	Win	6–0	Vince Foster	TKO	1 (6)	Nov 15, 1996	Fiesta Palace, Waukegan, Illinois, U.S.	
5	Win	5–0	Tony Golden	UD	6	Oct 18, 1996	Expo Center, Dolton, Illinois, U.S.	
4	Win	4–0	Patrick Hutchinson	TKO	1 (4)	Oct 11, 1996	Fiesta Palace, Waukegan, Illinois, U.S.	
3	Win	3–0	Leon Shavers	KO	1 (4)	Sep 24, 1996	Little Bit of Texas, Indianapolis, Indiana, U.S.	
2	Win	2–0	Robert Cameron	TKO	1 (4)	Aug 23, 1996	Fiesta Palace, Waukegan, Illinois, U.S.	
1	Win	1–0	Tyrone Bledsoe	KO	2 (?)	Jun 25, 1996	Little Bit of Texas, Indianapolis, Indiana, U.S.	Professional debut

== See also ==
- Lineal championship
- List of world super-middleweight boxing champions

Sporting positions
Amateur boxing titles
Previous: Jose Spearman	Golden Gloves middleweight champion 1996	Next: Dana Rucker
Regional boxing titles
New title	NABA-USA light-heavyweight champion February 20, 2009 – 2009; Vacated	Vacant Title next held by Sergey Kovalev
World boxing titles
Preceded by Frankie Liles	WBA super-middleweight champion Lineal super middleweight champion June 12, 1999 – April 8, 2000	Succeeded by Bruno Girard
Vacant Title last held by Bruno Girard	WBA super-middleweight champion March 3, 2001 – March 15, 2003	Succeeded by Sven Ottke as Unified champion
