= Mehdi Sahnoune =

French boxer

Personal information
- Nickname: Kounet
- Born: May 5, 1976 (age 50) Marseille, France
- Height: 5 ft 11 1/2 in (182 cm)
- Weight: Super middleweight; Light heavyweight

Boxing career
- Stance: Orthodox

Boxing record
- Total fights: 34
- Wins: 32
- Win by KO: 28
- Losses: 2

Mehdi Sahnoune (born May 5, 1976) is a French former professional boxer.

== Professional career ==
Known as "Kounet", Sahnoune turned pro in 1997 and challenged WBA Light Heavyweight Title holder Bruno Girard in 2003, winning the belt by TKO. He lost the belt in his first defense to Silvio Branco later that year. In 2005 he got another shot at a major belt, the WBO Light Heavyweight Title, against Zsolt Erdei, but he lost via TKO in the 12th round.

== Professional boxing record ==
34 fights	32 wins	2 losses
By knockout	28	2
By decision	4	0

No.	Result	Record	Opponent	Type	Round, time	Date	Location	Notes
34	Win	32–2	Ramdane Serdjane	RTD	4 (6)	2009-06-12	Salle Jean Roure, Les Pennes-Mirabeau, France	
33	Loss	31–2	Zsolt Erdei	TKO	12 (12)	2005-10-22	Brandberge Arena, Halle, Germany	For WBO light-heavyweight title
32	Win	31–1	Mukadi Manda	TKO	5 (8)	2005-04-29	Palais des Sports, Marseille, France	
31	Win	30–1	Roberto Coelho	TKO	7 (8)	2005-03-14	Palais des Sports, Paris, France	
30	Win	29–1	Enrique Campos	TKO	4 (8)	2004-11-08	Palais Omnisport de Paris-Bercy, Bercy, France	
29	Win	28–1	Richard Pokossi	TKO	4 (8)	2004-07-10	La Palestre, Le Cannet, France	
28	Win	27–1	Eliseo Nogueira	PTS	8 (8)	2004-05-27	Zénith d'Auvergne, Cournon-d'Auvergne, France	
27	Win	26–1	Jose Luis Loyola	TKO	6 (6)	2004-04-29	Palais des sports, Levallois-Perret, France	
26	Win	25–1	Christopher Robert	KO	2 (10)	2004-03-20	Palais des Sports de Gerland, Lyon, France	
25	Loss	24–1	Silvio Branco	TKO	11 (12)	2003-10-10	Palais des Sports, Marseille, France	Lost WBA light-heavyweight title
24	Win	24–0	Bruno Girard	TKO	7 (12)	2003-03-08	Palais des Sports, Marseille, France	Won WBA (Regular) light-heavyweight title
23	Win	23–0	Geoffroy Gordian Ulonna	TKO	7 (8)	2002-11-29	Les Pennes-Mirabeau, France	
22	Win	22–0	Mohamed Siluvangi	UD	8 (8)	2002-08-10	Plages du Prado, France	
21	Win	21–0	Ivica Cukusic	TKO	5 (8)	2002-07-13	Palavas-les-Flots, France	
20	Win	20–0	Thabiso Mogale	TKO	3 (8)	2002-06-11	Gymnase J.Roure, Les Pennes-Mirabeau, France	
19	Win	19–0	Andrey Shkalikov	UD	12 (12)	2002-02-23	Palais des Sports, Marseille, France	
18	Win	18–0	Milojko Pivljanin	TKO	3 (6)	2002-01-29	Les Pennes-Mirabeau, France	
17	Win	17–0	Youssef Temsoury	KO	2 (10)	2001-11-16	Les Pennes-Mirabeau, France	Retained French super-middleweight title
16	Win	16–0	Ricardo Simarra	KO	3 (6)	2001-08-04	Plages du Prado, France	
15	Win	15–0	Rene Claude Dutard	KO	2 (10)	2001-05-18	Pointe-à-Pitre, Guadeloupe	Retained French super-middleweight title
14	Win	14–0	Wilfried Visee Rivelli	TKO	3 (10)	2001-01-26	Pont-Sainte-Maxence, France	For vacant French super-middleweight title
13	Win	13–0	Roman Costel	TKO	3 (6)	2000-12-09	Villeurbanne, France	
12	Win	12–0	Patrick Julan	TKO	8 (8)	2000-06-16	Saint-Quentin, France	
11	Win	11–0	Istvan Gabnai	KO	3 (8)	2000-04-07	Châteauroux, France	
10	Win	10–0	Youssef Temsoury	PTS	8 (8)	2000-02-11	Châteauroux, France	
9	Win	9–0	Csaba Olah	TKO	6 (6)	1999-11-20	Saint-Nazaire, France	
8	Win	8–0	Valere Thomas	TKO	6 (6)	1999-10-08	Grande-Synthe, France	
7	Win	7–0	Nicolas Lewinsky	TKO	4 (6)	1999-07-24	Grand Casino de Palm Beach, Cannes, France	
6	Win	6–0	Emmanuel Mahieux	KO	2 (6)	1999-03-06	Aubagne, France	
5	Win	5–0	Djaafar Filali	TKO	2 (6)	1998-11-28	Hussigny-Godbrange, France	
4	Win	4–0	Antonio Gretzi	KO	2 (6)	1998-11-10	Gardanne, France	
3	Win	3–0	Jean Francois Houis	TKO	2 (4)	1998-05-22	Marseille, France	
2	Win	2–0	Doulyassad Joubij	TKO	1 (4)	1998-03-20	Marseille, France	
1	Win	1–0	Enis Boussandel	TKO	4 (4)	1997-12-12	Toulon, France	

== Criminal charges ==
Sahnoune was sentenced to a three-year prison term for allegedly participating in a battery on a man outside a nightclub in Aix-en-Provence, France.

== See also ==
- List of world light-heavyweight boxing champions

Sporting positions
Regional boxing titles
Vacant Title last held by Olivier Beard	French super-middleweight champion January 26, 2001 – 2002; Vacated	Vacant Title next held by Jean-Paul Mendy
World boxing titles
Preceded by Bruno Girard	WBA light-heavyweight champion Regular title March 8, 2003 – April 15, 2003; Status changed	Vacant Title next held by Silvio Branco
Preceded by Roy Jones Jr. as Unified champion	WBA light-heavyweight champion April 15, 2003 – October 10, 2003	Succeeded by Silvio Branco
