= Klemetsen =

Klemetsen is a Norwegian surname. Notable people with the surname include:

- Håvard Klemetsen (born 1979), Norwegian Nordic combined skier
- Ole Klemetsen (born 1971), Norwegian boxer
