= Bruno Girard =

French boxer

Personal information
- Nationality: French
- Born: November 25, 1970 (age 55) Blois, Loir-et-Cher, France
- Height: 6 ft 1 1/2 in (187 cm)
- Weight: Super middleweight; Light heavyweight

Boxing career
- Reach: 73 in (185 cm)
- Stance: Orthodox

Boxing record
- Total fights: 48
- Wins: 42
- Win by KO: 7
- Losses: 4
- Draws: 2

Bruno Girard (born November 25, 1970) was a French professional boxer who competed in the super middleweight and light heavyweight divisions, he held the WBA title in both divisions.

== Professional boxing career ==
The light-hitting Girard turned pro in 1991 and challenged Byron Mitchell for WBA and Lineal Super Middleweight Titles in 1999, in his first US fight. The fight was a draw, and in the rematch in 2000 Girard won a unanimous decision to win the titles. Girard defended the belt once against Manny Siaca and then was stripped of the title for declining a rematch.

In late 2001 he moved up to light heavyweight and took on southpaw Lou Del Valle for the Vacant WBA Light Heavyweight Title and drew with him. Later that year, he took on Robert Koon for the Vacant belt, and won via TKO. He defended the belt twice including a rematch with Del Valle, before losing to Mehdi Sahnoune via 7th-round TKO in 2003. Girard retired after the bout.

== Professional boxing record ==
48 fights	42 wins	4 losses
By knockout	7	1
By decision	35	3
Draws	2	

No.	Result	Record	Opponent	Type	Round, time	Date	Location	Notes
48	Loss	42–4–2	Mehdi Sahnoune	TKO	7 (12)	Mar 8, 2003	Palais des Sports, Marseille, France	Lost WBA (Regular) light-heavyweight title
47	Win	42–3–2	Lou Del Valle	SD	12 (12)	Jul 13, 2002	Palavas-les-Flots, Hérault, France	Retained WBA (Regular) light-heavyweight title
46	Win	41–3–2	Thomas Hansvoll	UD	12 (12)	May 23, 2002	Palais des sports Marcel-Cerdan, Levallois-Perret, France	Retained WBA (Regular) light-heavyweight title
45	Win	40–3–2	Robert Koon	TKO	11 (12)	Dec 22, 2001	Le Zénith, Orléans, France	Won vacant WBA (Regular) light-heavyweight title
44	Draw	39–3–2	Lou Del Valle	SD	12 (12)	Aug 4, 2001	Plage du Prado, Marseille, France	For vacant WBA (Regular) light-heavyweight title
43	Win	39–3–1	Marco Antonio Duarte	KO	4 (8)	May 14, 2001	Palais des Sports, Paris, France	
42	Win	38–3–1	Manny Siaca	SD	12 (12)	Sep 16, 2000	Châteauroux, Indre, France	Retained WBA super-middleweight title
41	Win	37–3–1	Byron Mitchell	UD	12 (12)	Apr 8, 2000	Palais Omnisport de Paris-Bercy, Paris, France	Won WBA super-middleweight title
40	Draw	36–3–1	Byron Mitchell	SD	12 (12)	Dec 11, 1999	Grand Casino, Tunica, Mississippi, U.S.	For WBA super-middleweight title
39	Win	36–3	Juergen Hartenstein	TKO	8 (12)	Jun 7, 1999	Palais des sports Marcel-Cerdan, Levallois-Perret, France	Retained EBU super-middleweight title
37	Win	35–3	Andrey Shkalikov	SD	12 (12)	Apr 10, 1999	Palais Omnisport de Paris-Bercy, Paris, France	Won vacant EBU super-middleweight title
37	Win	34–3	Rob Bleakley	TKO	6 (8)	Feb 26, 1999	Thiais, Val-de-Marne, France	
36	Win	33–3	Michel Simeon	PTS	6 (6)	Dec 3, 1998	Épernay, Marne, France	
35	Win	32–3	Hassan Mokhtar	PTS	8 (8)	Nov 6, 1998	Thiais, Val-de-Marne, France	
34	Win	31–3	Patrice Cord'Homme	PTS	10 (10)	May 16, 1998	Palais Omnisport de Paris-Bercy, Paris, France	Retained France super-middleweight title
33	Win	30–3	Darren Dorrington	PTS	8 (8)	Mar 30, 1998	Santa Cruz de Tenerife, Islas Canarias, Spain	
32	Win	29–3	Allaoua Anki	UD	10 (10)	Feb 3, 1998	Pont-Audemer, Eure, France	Retained France super-middleweight title
31	Win	28–3	Orlando Wiet	PTS	8 (8)	Dec 6, 1997	Dombasle-sur-Meurthe, Meurthe-et-Moselle, France	
30	Win	27–3	Darren Sweeney	TKO	6 (10)	Nov 5, 1997	Santa Cruz de Tenerife, Islas Canarias, Spain	
29	Win	26–3	Vitaliy Kopytko	KO	6 (?)	Oct 10, 1997	Selles-sur-Cher, Loir-et-Cher, France	
28	Win	25–3	Jean-Roger Tsidjo	PTS	10 (10)	Apr 4, 1997	Romorantin, Loir-et-Cher, France	Retained France super-middleweight title
27	Win	24–3	Mathieu Raybier	PTS	10 (10)	Feb 14, 1997	Ajaccio, Corse-du-Sud, France	
26	Win	23–3	Jean-Roger Tsidjo	UD	10 (10)	Apr 13, 1996	Levallois-Perret, Hauts-de-Seine, France	Won France super-middleweight title
25	Win	22–3	Abderhaman Taouri	PTS	8 (8)	Feb 24, 1996	Palais des sports Marcel-Cerdan, Levallois-Perret, France	
24	Win	21–3	Janos Ferenc Dobai	PTS	8 (8)	Oct 27, 1995	Romorantin, Loir-et-Cher, France	
23	Win	20–3	Gaston Cool	PTS	8 (8)	May 6, 1995	Romorantin, Loir-et-Cher, France	
22	Loss	19–3	Tshimanga M'Biye	PTS	10 (10)	Mar 11, 1995	Lille, Nord, France	For France super-middleweight title
21	Loss	19–2	Mohamed Siluvangi	PTS	8 (8)	Jun 24, 1994	Sedan, Ardennes, France	
20	Win	19–1	Hamid Hadi	PTS	8 (8)	May 20, 1994	Vendôme, Loir-et-Cher, France	
19	Win	18–1	Gaston Cool	PTS	6 (6)	Apr 8, 1994	Blois, Loir-et-Cher, France	
18	Win	17–1	Rund Kanika	PTS	6 (6)	Feb 1, 1994	Palais des sports Marcel-Cerdan, Levallois-Perret, France	
17	Win	16–1	Blagoy Sokolov	PTS	8 (8)	Dec 3, 1993	Châteauroux, Indre, France	
16	Win	15–1	Marvin O'Brien	PTS	8 (8)	Oct 15, 1993	Romorantin, Loir-et-Cher, France	
15	Win	14–1	Christophe Younsi	PTS	6 (6)	May 19, 1993	Soissons, Aisne, France	
14	Win	13–1	Kristo Slavchev	KO	4 (?)	Apr 9, 1993	Romorantin, Loir-et-Cher, France	
13	Loss	12–1	Konstantin Semerdjiev	PTS	6 (6)	Feb 11, 1993	Romorantin, Loir-et-Cher, France	
12	Win	12–0	Tzvetan Todorov	PTS	6 (6)	Nov 29, 1992	Chenôve, Côte-d'Or, France	
11	Win	11–0	Jean-Paul Roux	PTS	6 (6)	Nov 13, 1992	Romorantin, Loir-et-Cher, France	
10	Win	10–0	Nebojsa Milosevic	PTS	6 (6)	Oct 16, 1992	Voglans, Savoie, France	
9	Win	9–0	Abdelakim Zirek	PTS	6 (6)	Sep 7, 1992	Laval, Mayenne, France	
8	Win	8–0	Patrice Cord'Homme	PTS	6 (6)	Jun 19, 1992	Romorantin, Loir-et-Cher, France	
7	Win	7–0	Camilo Alarcon	PTS	6 (6)	May 22, 1992	Romorantin, Loir-et-Cher, France	
6	Win	6–0	Abdelakim Zirek	PTS	6 (6)	Apr 17, 1992	Gap, Hautes-Alpes, France	
5	Win	5–0	Mohammed Hamila	PTS	6 (6)	Mar 27, 1992	Vendôme, Loir-et-Cher, France	
4	Win	4–0	Louis Benoit	PTS	6 (6)	Feb 14, 1992	Romorantin, Loir-et-Cher, France	
3	Win	3–0	Arnaud Brillant	PTS	6 (6)	Dec 14, 1991	Blois, Loir-et-Cher, France	
2	Win	2–0	Alain Leboucher	PTS	6 (6)	Nov 29, 1991	Blois, Loir-et-Cher, France	
1	Win	1–0	Milko Stoikov	PTS	6 (6)	Oct 18, 1991	Blois, Loir-et-Cher, France	

== See also ==
- Lineal championship
- List of world super-middleweight boxing champions
- List of world light-heavyweight boxing champions

Sporting positions
Regional boxing titles
Vacant Title last held by Dean Francis	EBU super middleweight champion April 10, 1999 – 2000; Vacated	Vacant Title next held by Andrey Shkalikov
World boxing titles
Preceded by Byron Mitchell	WBA super middleweight champion April 8, 2000 – February 2001; Stripped	Vacant Title next held by Byron Mitchell
New title	WBA light heavyweight champion Regular title December 22, 2001 – March 8, 2003	Succeeded by Mehdi Sahnoune
