= Nordin =

Nordin may refer to

- Nordin, New Brunswick, a small community in Canada
- Nordin (surname)
- Nordin (given name)
