= Fabrice Tiozzo =

French boxer

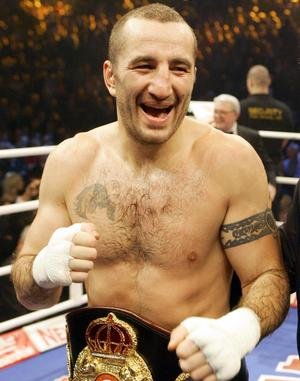

Personal information
- Nickname: The Bear
- Nationality: French
- Born: May 8, 1969 (age 57) Saint-Denis, France
- Height: 6 ft 0 1/2 in (184 cm)
- Weight: Light heavyweight; Cruiserweight

Boxing career
- Reach: 72 in (183 cm)
- Stance: Orthodox

Boxing record
- Total fights: 50
- Wins: 48
- Win by KO: 32
- Losses: 2

Fabrice Tiozzo (born May 8, 1969) is a French former professional boxer who competed from 1988 to 2006. He is a world champion in two weight classes, having held the WBC light-heavyweight title from 1995 to 1997, the WBA cruiserweight title from 1997 to 2000, and the WBA light-heavyweight title from 2004 to 2006. He is the younger brother of former super middleweight world champion of boxing, Christophe Tiozzo.

== Professional career ==
Fabrice turned professional in 1988 & amassed a record of 25-0 before he unsuccessfully fought American boxer Virgil Hill, for the WBA light heavyweight world title. Being floored twice en route to losing a split decision. Fabrice would get another opportunity at a world title nearly two years later, this time facing & defeating Jamaican boxer Mike McCallum, to win the WBC world title.

== Personal life ==
Fabrice has two brothers Christophe & Franck, who were also professional boxers.

== Professional boxing record ==
50 fights	48 wins	2 losses
By knockout	32	1
By decision	16	1

No.	Result	Record	Opponent	Type	Round, time	Date	Location	Notes
50	Win	48–2	Henry Saenz	KO	5 (10)	Jul 15, 2006	La Palestre, Le Cannet, Alpes-Maritimes, France	
49	Win	47–2	Dariusz Michalczewski	TKO	6 (12)	Feb 26, 2005	Color Line Arena, Altona, Hamburg, Germany	Retained WBA light-heavyweight title
48	Win	46–2	Silvio Branco	MD	12	Mar 20, 2004	Palais des Sports de Gerland, Lyon, Rhône, France	Won WBA (Regular) light-heavyweight title
47	Win	45–2	Joey DeGrandis	TKO	4 (8)	Jul 4, 2003	Futuroscope, Poitiers, Vienne, France	
46	Win	44–2	George Arias	UD	8	Mar 8, 2003	Palais des Sports, Marseille, Bouches-du-Rhône, France	
45	Win	43–2	Tiwon Taylor	TKO	3 (10)	Dec 22, 2001	Zenith, Orléans, Loiret, France	
44	Loss	42–2	Virgil Hill	TKO	1 (12)	Dec 9, 2000	Astroballe, Villeurbanne, Rhône, France	Lost WBA cruiserweight title
43	Win	42–1	Valeriy Vykhor	TKO	6 (12)	Apr 8, 2000	Palais Omnisport de Paris-Bercy, Paris, France	Retained WBA cruiserweight title
42	Win	41–1	Ken Murphy	TKO	7 (12)	Nov 13, 1999	Thomas & Mack Center, Las Vegas, Nevada, U.S.	Retained WBA cruiserweight title
41	Win	40–1	Ezequiel Paixao	TKO	2 (12)	Nov 14, 1998	L'Espace François Mitterrand, Mont-de-Marsan, Landes, France	Retained WBA cruiserweight title
40	Win	39–1	Terry Ray	TKO	1 (12)	May 2, 1998	Astroballe, Villeurbanne, Rhône, France	Retained WBA cruiserweight title
39	Win	38–1	Nate Miller	UD	12	Nov 8, 1997	Thomas & Mack Center, Las Vegas, Nevada, U.S.	Won WBA cruiserweight title
38	Win	37–1	Jeff Williams	TKO	2 (10)	Sep 26, 1997	Villeurbanne, Rhône, France	
37	Win	36–1	Ed Dalton	TKO	3 (10)	Apr 27, 1997	Villeurbanne, Rhône, France	
36	Win	35–1	Mike Peak	PTS	10	Mar 1, 1997	Halle Georges Carpentier, Paris, France	
35	Win	34–1	Leslie Stewart	KO	6 (10)	May 4, 1996	Villeurbanne, Rhône, France	
34	Win	33–1	Éric Lucas	UD	12	Jan 13, 1996	Palais des Spectacular, Saint-Etienne, France	Retained WBC light-heavyweight title
33	Win	32–1	Mike McCallum	UD	12	Jun 16, 1995	Palais des Sports de Gerland, Lyon, Rhône, France	Won WBC light-heavyweight title
32	Win	31–1	Noel Magee	TKO	4 (12)	Mar 5, 1995	Vitrolles, Bouches-du-Rhône, France	Retained EBU light-heavyweight title
31	Win	30–1	Maurice Core	TKO	4 (12)	Oct 25, 1994	Besançon, Doubs, France	Retained EBU light-heavyweight title
30	Win	29–1	Tim St Clair	TKO	5 (10)	Aug 14, 1994	Palavas-les-Flots, Hérault, France	
29	Win	28–1	Eddy Smulders	KO	7 (12)	Mar 5, 1994	Palais des Sports de Gerland, Lyon, Rhône, France	Won EBU light-heavyweight title
28	Win	27–1	Glazz Campbell	TKO	10 (10)	Nov 13, 1993	Caen, Calvados, France	
27	Win	26–1	Dale Jackson	KO	4 (10)	Sep 18, 1993	Lyon, Rhône, France	
26	Loss	25–1	Virgil Hill	SD	12	Apr 3, 1993	Palais des sports Marcel-Cerdan, Levallois-Perret, Hauts-de-Seine, France	For WBA light-heavyweight title
25	Win	25–0	Osley Silas	TKO	4 (8)	Jan 20, 1993	Avoriaz, Haute-Savoie, France	
24	Win	24–0	Ramzi Hassan	PTS	8	Nov 13, 1992	Bellegarde-sur-Valserine, Ain, France	
23	Win	23–0	Robert Johnson	TKO	5 (8)	Oct 3, 1992	Cirque d'hiver, Paris, France	
22	Win	22–0	Tony Wilson	PTS	8	Mar 21, 1992	Saint-Denis, Seine-Saint-Denis, France	
21	Win	21–0	John Foreman	TKO	6 (8)	Jan 26, 1992	Saint-Ouen, Loir-et-Cher, France	
20	Win	20–0	Ron Lee Warrior	KO	1 (6)	Dec 13, 1991	Palais Omnisport de Paris-Bercy, Paris, France	
19	Win	19–0	Ken Heflin	KO	1 (8)	Nov 3, 1991	Vilvoorde, Flemish Brabant, Belgium	
!8	Win	18–0	Terrence Wright	TKO	2 (8)	Oct 13, 1991	Salle Leyrit, Nice, Alpes-Maritimes, France	
17	Win	17–0	Eric Nicoletta	PTS	10	Jun 19, 1991	Lyon, Rhône, France	Won France light-heavyweight title
16	Win	16–0	Oliver Kemayou	TKO	3 (8)	May 4, 1991	Halle Georges Carpentier, Paris, France	
15	Win	15–0	Sylvester White	PTS	8	Mar 24, 1991	Vichy, Allier, France	
14	Win	14–0	Paul McCarthy	KO	2 (10)	Feb 9, 1991	Villeurbanne, Rhône, France	
13	Win	13–0	Serge Bolivard	PTS	10	Dec 23, 1990	Lyon, Rhône, France	
12	Win	12–0	David Overton	TKO	1 (8)	Nov 14, 1990	Lyon, Rhône, France	
11	Win	11–0	James Fernandez	KO	4 (8)	Oct 25, 1990	Villeurbanne, Rhône, France	
10	Win	10–0	John Held	PTS	8	Jun 29, 1990	Charbonnières, Saône-et-Loire, France	
9	Win	9–0	Frankie Hines	TKO	2 (8)	Jun 1, 1990	Salaise-sur-Sanne, Isère, France	
8	Win	8–0	Yves Monsieur	PTS	8	Apr 30, 1990	Charbonnières, Saône-et-Loire, France	
7	Win	7–0	Ian Bulloch	PTS	6	Mar 2, 1990	Salle Leyrit, Nice, Alpes-Maritimes, France	
6	Win	6–0	James Wilder	KO	3 (6)	Feb 9, 1990	Casino de Charbonnières, Lyon, Rhône, France	
5	Win	5–0	John Cox	KO	4 (6)	Dec 11, 1989	Issy-les-Moulineaux, Hauts-de-Seine, France	
4	Win	4–0	Rene Dere	TKO	1 (4)	Nov 25, 1989	Casino le Lyon Vert, Lyon, Rhône, France	
3	Win	3–0	Hassan Jalni	TKO	3 (4)	Jul 29, 1989	Deauville, Calvados, France	
2	Win	2–0	Hamid Hadi	PTS	4	Mar 31, 1989	Issy-les-Moulineaux, Hauts-de-Seine, France	
1	Win	1–0	Dionisio Del Valle	PTS	4	Nov 10, 1988	Felt Forum New York City, New York, U.S.	

== Titles in boxing ==
=== Major world titles ===
- WBA light-heavyweight champion (175 lbs)
- WBC light-heavyweight champion (175 lbs)
- WBA cruiserweight champion (200 lbs)

=== Secondary major world titles (Note: The secondary champion lineage lists the Regular or Unified champions while the primary champion is occupied.) ===
- WBA (Regular) light-heavyweight champion (Note: Tiozzo was the Secondary champion from February 20 – July 3, 2004.) (175 lbs)

=== Regional/International titles ===
- France light-heavyweight champion (175 lbs)
- EBU light-heavyweight champion (175 lbs)

== See also ==
- Notable boxing families
- List of world light-heavyweight boxing champions
- List of world cruiserweight boxing champions

== Notes ==
Sporting positions
Regional boxing titles
Preceded by Eddy Smulders	EBU light heavyweight champion March 5, 1994 – 1995; Vacated	Vacant Title next held by Eddy Smulders
World boxing titles
Preceded by Mike McCallum	WBC light heavyweight champion June 16, 1995 – January 18, 1997; Vacated	Succeeded by Roy Jones Jr. Interim champion promoted
Preceded by Nate Miller	WBA cruiserweight champion November 8, 1997 – December 9, 2000	Succeeded by Virgil Hill
Preceded by Silvio Branco	WBA (Regular) light heavyweight champion March 20, 2004 – July 3, 2004; Promoted	Vacant Title next held by Jürgen Brähmer
Preceded by Antonio Tarver	WBA light heavyweight champion July 3, 2004 – October 19, 2006; Retired	Succeeded by Silvio Branco; Interim champion promoted
