= Ole Klemetsen =

Norwegian boxer

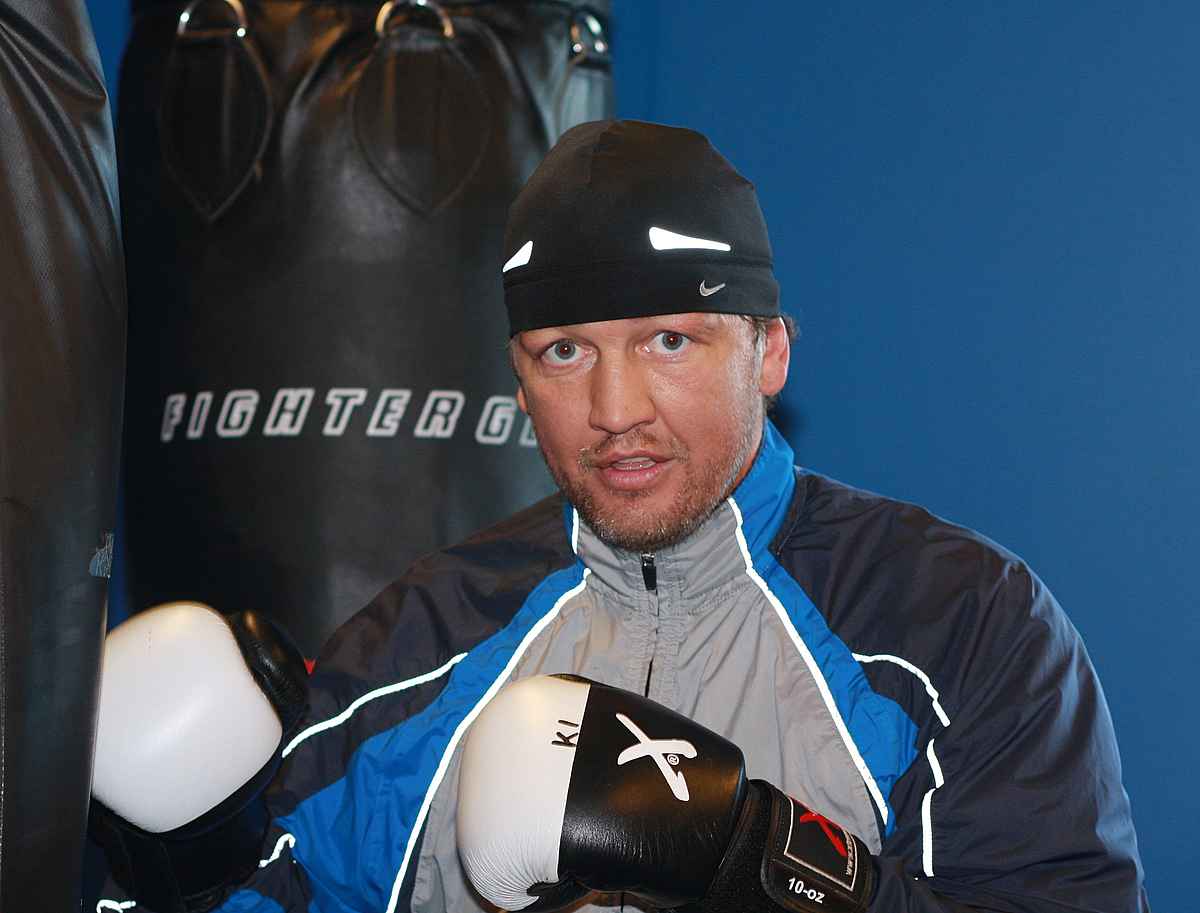

Medal record

Men's Boxing

Representing Norway

World Amateur Championships
Bronze medal – third place	1991 Sydney	Light Middleweight

European Amateur Championships
Bronze medal – third place	1991 Gothenburg	Light Middleweight

Ole "Lukkøye" Klemetsen (born 30 August 1971) is a retired Norwegian boxer in the Light Heavyweight division. He was nicknamed "Mister Sandman" and the "Golden Viking".

== Amateur career ==
He medaled twice at international events and represented Norway at the 1992 Summer Olympics.

== Professional career ==
As a pro he fought in Denmark as a light-heavyweight where he was a feared puncher with a vulnerable chin. He was European EBU Light Heavyweight champion. His professional record is 45 victories and 6 losses. He won the (lightly regarded) titles, IBC Light Heavyweight and IBA Light Heavyweight. His most notable bout was a 1998 IBF title challenge, where he was outpointed by Reggie Johnson.

Klemetsen retired after a bout which resulted in a loss against Thomas Hansvoll on 16 June 2001.

He featured in a documentary «Blod & Ære» that won an award at Grimstad Kortfilmfestival 2008.

He is currently a coach at the Martial Arts Institute in Stavanger. In 2005 he joined the party list of Demokratene in an effort to secure a Parliament seat for Jan Simonsen.

== Professional boxing record ==
45 Wins (36 knockouts, 9 decisions), 6 Losses (4 knockouts, 2 decisions)
Result	Record	Opponent	Type	Round	Date	Location	Notes
Loss	46-6	(Norway) Thomas Hansvoll	KO	2	16 Jun 2001	(Denmark) Brøndby Hallen, Brøndby	WBA Intercontinental/Nordic Light Heavyweight Titles. Ole knocked out at 0:32 of the second round.
Win	46-5	(United States) Patrick Swann	KO	5	27 Apr 2001	(Denmark) Aalborg Hallen, Aalborg	
Win	45-5	(Norway) Thomas Hansvoll	DQ	2	9 Feb 2001	(Denmark) Odense Idraetshal, Odense	Nordic Light Heavyweight Title. Referee disqualified Hansvoll at 2:59 of the second round.
Win	44-5	(United States) Derrick James	SD	8	6 Oct 2000	(Denmark) Naestved Hallen, Naestved	78-76, 78-77, 77-78.
Loss	43-5	(United Kingdom) Clinton Woods	TKO	9	29 Apr 2000	(United Kingdom) Wembley Arena, Wembley, London	EBU Light Heavyweight Title.
Win	43-4	(South Africa) Thulani Malinga	TKO	8	14 Jan 2000	(Denmark) Kolding-Hallen, Kolding	IBA World Light Heavyweight Title. Referee stopped the bout at 2:40 of the eighth round.
Win	42-4	(United States) Robert Koon	TKO	4	26 Nov 1999	Viborg Stadionhal, Viborg, Denmark	
Win	41-4	(United States) William Bo James	KO	3	29 Oct 1999	(Denmark) K.B. Hallen, Copenhagen	
Win	40-4	(United States) Tyrone Castell	KO	2	3 Sep 1999	(Denmark) K.B. Hallen, Copenhagen	
Win	39-4	(United States) Angelo Simpson	UD	8	24 Apr 1999	(Germany) Circus Krone, Munich, Bavaria	80-72, 80-72, 80-72.
Win	38-4	(United Kingdom) Greg Scott Briggs	KO	4	13 Mar 1999	(United Kingdom) Bowlers Exhibition Centre, Trafford, Greater Manchester	Briggs knocked out at 2:47 of the fourth round.
Win	37-4	(United Kingdom) Danny Juma	RTD	1	13 Feb 1999	(United Kingdom) Telewest Arena, Newcastle upon Tyne	Juma retired at 1:00 of the first round.
Win	36-4	(United Kingdom) Darren Ashton	TKO	2	19 Dec 1998	(United Kingdom) Everton Park Sports Centre, Liverpool, Merseyside	Referee stopped the bout at 1:49 of the second round.
Loss	35-4	(Nigeria) Peter Oboh	KO	1	26 Sep 1998	(United Kingdom) Barbican Centre, York	Ole knocked out at 2:55 of the first round.
Win	35-3	(United States) Artee Bright	KO	1	22 Aug 1998	(Germany) Messehalle, Leipzig, Saxony	
Loss	34-3	(United States) "Sweet" Reggie Johnson	UD	12	29 May 1998	(Italy) Pesaro, Marche	IBF World Light Heavyweight Title. 112-114, 109-114, 107-116.
Win	34-2	(Bulgaria) Kalin Stoyanov	TKO	1	31 Jan 1998	(United Kingdom) Lee Valley Leisure Complex, Picketts Lock, London	Referee stopped the bout at 2:45 of the first round.
Win	33-2	(United Kingdom) Crawford Ashley	TKO	2	4 Oct 1997	(United Kingdom) Alexandra Palace, Muswell Hill, London	EBU Light Heavyweight Title. Referee stopped the bout at the end of the second round.
Win	32-2	(United States) Rick Camlin	TKO	3	12 Jul 1997	(United Kingdom) Olympia, Kensington, London	Referee stopped the bout at 0:46 of the third round.
Win	31-2	(Mexico) Eduardo Cruz	KO	3	13 Jun 1997	(Denmark) Antvorskovhallen, Slagelse	
Win	30-2	(United States) Rodney Toney	TKO	2	2 May 1997	(Denmark) Randers Hallen, Randers	
Win	29-2	(United States) Vinson Durham	PTS	8	30 Nov 1996	(Austria) Arena Nova, Wiener Neustadt	
Win	28-2	(United States) Jimmy Matz	KO	1	15 Nov 1996	(Denmark) Naestved Hallen, Naestved	
Win	27-2	(Sweden) Luan Morina	KO	1	29 Jun 1996	(United Kingdom) Erith, London	Morina knocked out at 0:10 of the first round.
Loss	26-2	(Democratic Republic of the Congo) Mohamed Siluvangi	PTS	12	2 Apr 1996	(United Kingdom) Elephant & Castle Centre, Southwark	WBC International Light Heavyweight Title.
Win	26-1	(United States) Lenzie Morgan	KO	2	3 Feb 1996	(France) Levallois-Perret, Hauts-de-Seine	WBC International Light Heavyweight Title.
Win	25-1	(Argentina) Julio Abel Gonzalez	KO	2	29 Nov 1995	(United Kingdom) York Hall, Bethnal Green, London	
Win	24-1	(United States) Michael Dale	KO	1	21 Sep 1995	(United Kingdom) Battersea Town Hall, Battersea, London	
Win	23-1	(United States) Charles Oliver	PTS	10	9 Jun 1995	(Denmark) Kolding-Hallen, Kolding	
Win	22-1	(United Kingdom) Nigel Rafferty	TKO	4	17 May 1995	(United Kingdom) Ipswich, Suffolk	
Win	20-1	(United States) Eric L. French	PTS	10	31 Mar 1995	(United States) Detroit	
Win	19-1	(United States) John Mitchell	KO	2	17 Mar 1995	(Denmark) K.B. Hallen, Copenhagen	
Win	18-1	(United States) James Hayes	KO	2	18 Feb 1995	(United Kingdom) Bath & West Country Showground, Shepton Mallet, Somerset	
Win	17-1	(United States) Earl Butler	TKO	1	11 Nov 1994	(Denmark) Randers Hallen, Randers	
Win	16-1	(United States) Eric A. Brown	KO	3	7 Oct 1994	(Denmark) K.B. Hallen, Copenhagen	
Win	15-1	(United States) Rocky Gannon	KO	1	16 Sep 1994	(Denmark) Aalborg Hallen, Aalborg	
Win	14-1	(United States) Karl Willis	KO	2	10 Jun 1994	(Denmark) Kolding-Hallen, Kolding	
Win	13-1	(Guadeloupe) Etienne Obertan	KO	5	22 Apr 1994	(Denmark) Aalborg Hallen, Aalborg	
Win	12-1	(Uruguay) Juan Alberto Barrero	KO	2	18 Feb 1994	(Denmark) Randers Hallen, Randers	
Win	11-1	(United Kingdom) Simon McDougall	KO	5	29 Jan 1994	Wales National Ice Rink, Cardiff	
Win	10-1	(United States) Carl Jones	UD	6	6 Nov 1993	(United States) Las Vegas	
Win	9-1	(United Kingdom) Tony Booth	UD	8	17 Sep 1993	(Denmark) Cirkusbygningen, Copenhagen	
Win	8-1	(United States) Jeff Medley	KO	4	6 May 1993	(United States) The Riviera, Las Vegas	
Win	7-1	(United Kingdom) Nigel Rafferty	KO	2	14 Apr 1993	(United Kingdom) Kensington, London	Rafferty knocked out at 2:33 of the second round.
Loss	6-1	(United States) John McClain	TKO	1	9 Mar 1993	(United States) Casino Magic, Bay Saint Louis, Mississippi	Referee stopped the bout at 0:51 of the first round.
Win	6-0	(United States) David Picha	TKO	2	27 Feb 1993	(China) Capital City Gymnasium, Beijing	Referee stopped the bout at 1:26 of the second round.
Win	5-0	(United States) Bob Charlez	PTS	6	30 Jan 1993	(United States) Las Vegas	
Win	4-0	(Wales) John Kaighin	KO	3	28 Jan 1993	(United Kingdom) Mayfair, London	
Win	3-0	(United Kingdom) Steve Osborne	KO	1	10 Dec 1992	(United Kingdom) York Hall, Bethnal Green, London	
Win	2-0	(United States) Joe Wallace	KO	1	25 Nov 1992	(United States) Las Vegas	
Win	1-0	Armando Dragone	KO	1	21 Oct 1992	(United States) Las Vegas	
