= Manny Siaca =

Puerto Rican boxer

Personal information
- Nationality: Puerto Rican
- Born: Manuel Alejandro Siaca; November 21, 1975 (age 50) Toa Baja, Puerto Rico
- Height: 6 ft 1 in (185 cm)
- Weight: Middleweight; Super middleweight; Light heavyweight; Cruiserweight

Boxing career
- Reach: 78 in (198 cm)
- Stance: Orthodox

Boxing record
- Total fights: 33
- Wins: 25
- Win by KO: 20
- Losses: 8

Manuel Alejandro Siaca (born November 21, 1975) is a Puerto Rican boxer at super middleweight.

== Professional career ==
Siaca was born in Toa Baja, Puerto Rico, the son of Manny Siaca Sr., who was a noted boxing trainer and trained the likes of Edwin Rosario and Wilfredo Vazquez to world championships. He turned pro in 1997 and challenged Bruno Girard in 2000 for the WBA Super Middleweight Title, but lost a split decision. In 2001 he took on Byron Mitchell for the vacant WBA Super Middleweight Title.

Although Siaca was down in the 9th and 12th, he was leading in the fight but was stopped in the 12th. He challenged Mitchell later in the year and in a fight in which Siaca was down in the first and Mitchell was down in the 12th, Siaca lost a split decision.

In 2004 Siaca was able to capture a belt, winning the WBA Super Middleweight Title in an upset split decision victory over Anthony Mundine. He lost the title in his first defense to Mikkel Kessler, after Siaca remained in his corner after round 7.

In 2006 he moved up in weight and battled Silvio Branco for the interim WBA Light Heavyweight Title, but lost the decision.

== Professional boxing record ==
33 fights	25 wins	8 losses
By knockout	20	4
By decision	5	4

No.	Result	Record	Opponent	Type	Round, time	Date	Location	Notes
33	Loss	25–8	Rohan Murdock	RTD	6 (10)	2014-11-06	Jupiters Hotel & Casino, Broadbeach, Queensland, Australia	For vacant WBO Asia Pacific super middleweight title
32	Win	25–7	Milton Núñez	UD	8 (8)	2013-04-06	Coliseo Guillermo Angulo, Carolina, Puerto Rico	
31	Win	24–7	George Rivera	UD	10 (10)	2011-11-04	Coliseo Antonio R. Barcelo, Toa Baja, Puerto Rico	Won vacant WBA Fedecaribe middleweight title
30	Win	23–7	Jhon Berrio	TKO	1 (10)	2011-10-07	Coliseo Rebekah Colberg Cabrera, Cabo Rojo, Puerto Rico	
29	Loss	22–7	Danny Green	KO	3 (12)	2010-04-14	Challenge Stadium, Perth, Western Australia, Australia	For IBO cruiserweight title
28	Win	22–6	George Klinesmith	KO	1 (10)	2009-03-28	Coliseo Rubén Rodríguez, Bayamon, Puerto Rico	
27	Win	21–6	David Whittom	UD	10 (10)	2008-05-23	Coliseo Antonio R. Barcelo, Toa Baja, Puerto Rico	
26	Loss	20–6	Silvio Branco	UD	12 (12)	2006-07-27	Velodromo Vigorelli, Milan, Lombardia, Italy	For interim WBA light heavyweight title
25	Win	20–5	Tony Menefee	TKO	2 (12)	2005-09-09	Coliseo Antonio R. Barcelo, Toa Baja, Puerto Rico	Won vacant WBA Fedelatin light heavyweight title
24	Win	19–5	Tim Bowe	TKO	2 (10)	2005-05-13	Coliseo Pedrin Zorrilla, San Juan, Puerto Rico	
23	Loss	18–5	Mikkel Kessler	RTD	7 (12)	2004-11-12	Brøndbyhallen, Brondby, Denmark	Lost WBA super middleweight title
22	Win	18–4	Anthony Mundine	SD	12 (12)	2004-05-05	Entertainment Centre, Sydney, New South Wales, Australia	Won WBA super middleweight title
21	Win	17–4	Demetrius Jenkins	TKO	4 (10)	2003-09-20	Mohegan Sun Arena, Uncasville, Connecticut, U.S.	
20	Win	16–4	Jose Cruz Rivas	TKO	2 (10)	2002-05-11	Roberto Clemente Coliseum, San Juan, Puerto Rico	
19	Loss	15–4	Byron Mitchell	SD	12 (12)	2001-09-29	Madison Square Garden, New York City, New York, U.S.	For WBA super middleweight title
18	Win	15–3	Luis Apellaniz	KO	1 (10)	2001-07-08	Maracay, Venezuela	
17	Loss	14–3	Byron Mitchell	TKO	12 (12)	2001-03-03	Mandalay Bay Resort & Casino, Las Vegas, Nevada, U.S.	For vacant WBA super middleweight title
16	Loss	14–2	Bruno Girard	SD	12 (12)	2000-09-16	Chateauroux, Indre, France	For WBA super middleweight title
15	Win	14–1	Terry Ford	TKO	1 (?)	2000-07-01	Bayamon, Puerto Rico	
14	Win	13–1	Danny Garcia	TKO	2 (12)	1999-11-27	Carolina, Puerto Rico	Retained WBA Fedelatin super middleweight title
13	Win	12–1	Jose Luis Gil Atencio	KO	1 (?)	1999-08-21	Ciudad Bolivar, Venezuela	
12	Win	11–1	Eric Brown	TKO	2 (6)	1999-06-19	Miccosukee Resort & Gaming, Miami, Florida, U.S.	
11	Win	10–1	Carlos Robles	TKO	8 (12)	1999-02-26	Los Teques, Venezuela	Won vacant WBA Fedelatin super middleweight title
10	Win	9–1	Jose Mosquera	KO	2 (?)	1998-10-03	Gimnasio Jose Beracasa, Caracas, Venezuela	
9	Win	8–1	Shane Norford	KO	1 (?)	1998-08-23	Arena, Yokohama, Kanagawa, Japan	
8	Loss	7–1	Patrick Lewis	MD	4 (4)	1998-04-10	Ramada Inn, Rosemont, Illinois, U.S.	
7	Win	7–0	Malcolm Brooks	TKO	3 (?)	1998-04-03	Coliseo Rubén Rodríguez, Bayamon, Puerto Rico	
6	Win	6–0	Charles Towns	KO	3 (4)	1998-01-31	Ice Palace, Tampa, Florida, U.S.	
5	Win	5–0	Hamilton Diaz	TKO	2 (?)	1997-10-25	San Juan, Puerto Rico	
4	Win	4–0	Walter David	TKO	3 (?)	1997-09-19	Juana Diaz, Puerto Rico	
3	Win	3–0	Omar Gonzalez	KO	1 (?)	1997-06-21	Guaynabo, Puerto Rico	
2	Win	2–0	Carlos Castro	KO	1 (?)	1997-05-31	Coliseo Tomas Dones, Fajardo, Puerto Rico	
1	Win	1–0	Derrick Whitley	UD	4 (4)	1997-04-19	Centro Convenciones, Condado, Puerto Rico	

== See also ==
- List of world super-middleweight boxing champions
- List of Puerto Rican boxing world champions
- Boxing in Puerto Rico

Sporting positions
World boxing titles
Preceded by Anthony Mundine	WBA super middleweight champion May 5, 2004 – November 12, 2004	Succeeded by Mikkel Kessler
