= Mohamed Siluvangi =

Congolese boxer (born 1967)

Personal information
- Nationality: Congolese
- Born: March 2, 1967 (age 59) Kinshasa, DRC

Boxing career
- Stance: Orthodox

Boxing record
- Total fights: 40
- Wins: 25
- Win by KO: 9
- Losses: 14
- Draws: 1

Mohamed Siluvangi (born 2 March 1967 in Kinshasa) is a light heavyweight Congolese boxer who turned pro in 1993. He competed in the men's middleweight event at the 1992 Summer Olympics.

== Professional boxing record ==
Result	Record	Opponent	Type	Date	Location	Notes
40	25-14-1	(Russia) Valery Brudov	KO	24 Feb 2003	Palais des Sports, Levallois-Perret, Hauts-de-Seine, France	
39	25-13-1	(France) Jackson Chanet	PTS	15 Dec 2002	Palais des Sports, Levallois-Perret, Hauts-de-Seine, France	
38	25-12-1	(France) Frederic Serrat	UD	5 Oct 2002	Andrezieux-Boutheon, Loire, France	
37	25-11-1	(France) Alain Simon	UD	17 Sep 2002	Berck-sur-Mer, Pas-de-Calais, France	
36	25-10-1	(France) Mehdi Sahnoune	UD	10 Aug 2002	Plage du Prado, Marseille, Bouches-du-Rhône, France	
35	25-9-1	(Croatia) Stipe Drews	PTS	20 Jul 2002	Arena Westfalenhalle, Dortmund, Nordrhein-Westfalen, Germany	
34	25-8-1	(Denmark) Mads Larsen	UD	15 Mar 2002	Viborg Stadionhal, Viborg, Denmark	
33	25-7-1	(France) Wilfried Visee Rivelli	PTS	23 Feb 2002	Palais des Sports, Marseille, Bouches-du-Rhône, France	
32	24-7-1	(Germany) Thomas Ulrich	UD	15 Dec 2001	Estrel Convention Center, Neukölln, Berlin, Germany	
31	24-6-1	(France) Frederic Serrat	PTS	6 Nov 2001	Guilherand-Granges, Ardèche, France	
30	24-5-1	(France) Kamel Amrane	PTS	2 Oct 2001	Château-Thierry, Aisne, France	lost France light heavyweight title
29	24-4-1	(Italy) Vincenzo Cantatore	TKO	4 Aug 2001	Fregene, Lazio, Italy	lost WBC International cruiserweight title
28	24-3-1	(Belgium) Frank Wuestenberghs	PTS	19 Jan 2001	Nouzonville, Ardennes, France	
27	23-3-1	(France) Kamel Amrane	PTS	21 Nov 2000	Guilherand-Granges, Ardèche, France	lost France light heavyweight title
26	23-2-1	(Cuba) Juan Carlos Gomez	TKO	11 Mar 2000	Hansehalle, Lübeck, Schleswig-Holstein, Germany	lost WBC World cruiserweight title
25	23-1-1	(France) Philippe Michel	PTS	16 Jun 1999	Sedan, Ardennes, France	won EBU (European) light heavyweight title
24	22-1-1	(France) Mohammed Nedjadi	PTS	15 Jan 1999	Sedan, Ardennes, France	
23	21-1-1	(United Kingdom) Crawford Ashley	PTS	26 Sep 1998	Barbican Centre, York, Yorkshire, United Kingdom	lost vacant EBU (European) light heavyweight title
22	21-0-1	(Tunisia) Ridha Soussi	PTS	28 Mar 1998	Ice Arena, Hull, Yorkshire, United Kingdom	
21	20-0-1	(Russia) Sergey Korolev	PTS	21 Sep 1997	Besançon, Doubs, France	
20	19-0-1	(Ivory Coast) Onebo Maxime	PTS	1 Mar 1997	Halle Georges Carpentier, Paris, Paris, France	
19	18-0-1	(Nigeria) Peter Oboh	TKO	27 Aug 1996	Blazers Night Club, Windsor, Berkshire, United Kingdom	
18	17-0-1	(Norway) Ole Klemetsen	UD	2 Apr 1996	Elephant & Castle Centre, Southwark, London, United Kingdom	won WBC International light heavyweight title
17	16-0-1	(Hungary) Janos Ferenc Dobai	KO	5 Dec 1995	Sedan, Ardennes, France	
16	15-0-1	(France) Nourredine Bouakaz	KO	4 Nov 1995	Saint-Ave, Morbihan, France	
15	14-0-1	(Cameroon) Jean-Roger Tsidjo	TKO	2 Jun 1995	Sedan, Ardennes, France	
14	13-0-1	(Tunisia) Mohammed Hamila	PTS	3 Mar 1995	Charleville-Mézières, Ardennes, France	
13	12-0-1	(Tunisia) Mohammed Hamila	PTS	11 Feb 1995	Bertrix, Luxembourg, Belgium	
12	11-0-1	(Zaire) Albert Ngimbi	PTS	4 Nov 1994	Sedan, Ardennes, France	
11	10-0-1	(France) Bruno Girard	PTS	24 Jun 1994	Sedan, Ardennes, France	
10	9-0-1	(France) Stephane Jegou	TKO	13 May 1994	Sedan, Ardennes, France	
9	8-0-1	(France) Jean-Paul Roux	TKO	15 Apr 1994	Sedan, Ardennes, France	
8	7-0-1	(Portugal) Carlos Martins	TD	5 Mar 1994	Saint-Ave, Morbihan, France	
7	6-0-1	(Togo) Klayima Awouitoh	PTS	4 Feb 1994	Sedan, Ardennes, France	
6	5-0-1	(Belgium) Dirk Wallyn	PTS	15 Dec 1993	Izegem, West-Vlaanderen, Belgium	
5	5-0	(Algeria) Mourad Cherchou	PTS	5 Nov 1993	Sedan, Ardennes, France	
4	4-0	(Belgium) Gaston Cool	TKO	26 Jun 1993	Charleville, Queensland, Australia	
3	3-0	(France) Leopold Booh	KO	9 Apr 1993	Rethel, Ardennes, France	
2	2-0	(Belgium) Danny Leenaert	PTS	26 Mar 1993	Sedan, Ardennes, France	
1	1-0	(Belgium) Frank Wuestenberghs	TKO	12 Feb 1993	Sedan, Ardennes, France	Professional debut
