= Nordin (given name) =

Nordin is a masculine given name that may refer to the following people:

- Nordin Amrabat (born 1987), Dutch-born Moroccan Rifian footballer
- Nordin Bakker (born 1997), Dutch football player
- Nordin ben Salah (1972–2004), Dutch boxer and kickboxer
- Nordin Gerzić (born 1983), Bosnian-Herzegovinian-born Swedish footballer
- Nordin Jackers (born 1997), Belgian football goalkeeper
- Nordin Jbari (born 1975), Belgian football player of Moroccan descent
- Nordin Mohamed Jadi (born 1962), Malaysian track runner
- Nordin Musampa (born 2001), Dutch football defender
- Nordin Wooter (born 1976), Dutch footballer of Surinamese descent
