= Agostino Cardamone =

Italian boxer

Agostino Cardamone (born 1 December 1965) is an Italian former pro boxer of Romani origin best known for winning the European Middleweight title.

== Career ==
Cardamone, a southpaw, started his career in 1989 and won the Italian title against Silvio Branco in 1992. In 1993 he won the European crown, and in 1995 he challenged big-punching Julian Jackson for the vacant World Boxing Council title but was knocked out by a devastating right hand in the second round.

The next year he was upset by the unknown Russian Alexander Zaitsev (record 15-6) by knockout for the vacant European title but won a rematch on points. He won the lightly regarded World Boxing Union title in 1998 against Branco and successfully defended against him before getting knocked out by Dutch boxer Raymond Joval and retiring.
