= List of world light-heavyweight boxing champions =

This is a chronological list of world light heavyweight boxing champions, as recognized by four of the better-known sanctioning organizations:

== Championship recognition ==
=== 1903–1910 ===
The light-heavyweight division was created in 1903, the brainchild of Chicago journalist Lou Houseman who was also a boxing manager and promoter. He matched his own fighter Jack Root with Kid McCoy and announced the fight as being for the light-heavyweight championship of the world. The boxing press accepted the new weight division and Root was accepted as the inaugural world champion. Jack Root was defeated in his first title defense against George Gardner (boxer), who was considered the most thrilling fighter in the division, and the first undisputed Light - Heavyweight Champion of the World. During the 1980s, however, some boxing historians found records indicating that Joe Choynski won a twenty-round decision over Jimmy Ryan on August 18, 1899, in a fight billed as being for the light heavyweight championship. Choynski never seems to have made any claim to be the first light heavyweight champion.

- The International Boxing Union (IBU), formed in Paris in 1910. Changed name to European Boxing Union in 1946. It organised world title fights from 1913 to 1963 after which it was incorporated into the World Boxing Council (WBC).
- The New York State Athletic Commission (NYSAC), formed originally in 1911, banned in 1917, and then reformed in 1920. It organized world title bouts until the early 1970s when it became a member of World Boxing Council (WBC).
- The National Boxing Association (NBA) formed in the USA in 1921.

=== 1961–present ===
==== Championship awarding organizations ====
- The World Boxing Association (WBA), founded in 1921 as the National Boxing Association (NBA); it changed its name in 1961 and allowed membership from outside the USA.
- The World Boxing Council (WBC), founded in 1963.
- The International Boxing Federation (IBF), founded in 1983.
- The World Boxing Organization (WBO), founded in 1988.

| Reign Began | Reign Ended | Champion | Recognition |
|---|---|---|---|
Undisputed Champions
| 1903-04-22 | 1903-07-04 | (United States) Jack Root | World |
| 1903-07-04 | 1903-11-25 | (United Kingdom) George Gardiner | World |
The light-heavyweight division was not recognized outside North America until the Gardiner-Fitzsimmons title fight of November 1903
| 1903-11-25 | 1905-12-20 | (United Kingdom) Bob Fitzsimmons | World |
| 1905-12-20 | 1905-12-20-Vacated | (United States) Philadelphia Jack O'Brien | World |
| 1913-02-17 | 1914-06-15 | (United States) Bob Moha | NYSAC |
| 1914-04-14 | 1916-10-24 | (United States) Jack Dillon | World |
| 1916-10-24 | 1920-10-12 | (United States) Battling Levinsky | World |
| 1920-10-12 | 1922-09-24 | (France) Georges Carpentier | World |
| 1922-09-24 | 1923-03-17 | (France) Battling Siki | World |
| 1923-03-17 | 1925-05-30 | (Republic of Ireland) Mike McTigue | World |
| 1925-05-30 | 1926-07-16 | (United States) Paul Berlenbach | World |
| 1926-07-16 | 1927-07-26-Vacated | (Canada) Jack Delaney | World |
Delaney vacated the title to campaign in the heavyweight division. McTigue would subsequently be awarded the NYSAC title.
| 1927-07-26 | 1927-10-07 | (Republic of Ireland) Mike McTigue | NYSAC |
| 1927-08-30 | 1927-12-12 | (United States) Jimmy Slattery | NBA |
| 1927-10-07 | 1929-07-18-Vacated | (United States) Tommy Loughran | NYSAC/World |
| 1930-02-10 | 1930-06-25 | (United States) Jimmy Slattery | NYSAC |
| 1930-06-25 | 1933-03-24 | (United States) Maxie Rosenbloom | NYSAC/World/NYSAC |
Rosenbloom would be awarded the NBA title on September 1930, but would later be stripped of the same title on June 6, 1931 for inactivity.
| 1932-03-18 | 1932-12-17-Stripped | (United States) George Nichols | NBA |
Nichols was stripped of the title after losing a non-title bout to Lou Scozza. Joe Knight was subsequently awarded the vacant title.
| 1933-02-28 | 1933-03-01 | (United States) Joe Knight | NBA |
| 1933-03-01 | 1933-03-24 | (United States) Bob Godwin | NBA |
| 1933-03-24 | 1934-11-16 | (United States) Maxie Rosenbloom | World/NYSAC |
Rosenbloom was stripped of his NBA title on 17 Sep, 1934.
| 1934-11-16 | 1935-10-31 | (United States) Bob Olin | World |
| 1935-10-31 | 1938-10-28-Vacated | (United States) John Henry Lewis | World |
Lewis retired due to failing eyesight.
| 1939-02-03 | 1939-07-13 | (United States) Melio Bettina | NYSAC |
| 1939-07-10 | 1942-06-20 | (United Kingdom) Len Harvey | BBBofC |
| 1939-07-13 | 1940-06-05-Vacated | (United States) Billy Conn | World |
| 1941-01-13 | 1941-05-22 | (Greece) Anton Christoforidis | NBA |
| 1941-05-22 | 1948-07-26 | (United States) Gus Lesnevich | NBA/World |
| 1948-07-26 | 1950-01-24 | (United Kingdom) Freddie Mills | World |
| 1950-01-24 | 1952-12-17 | (United States) Joey Maxim | World |
| 1952-12-17 | 1960-10-25 | (United States) Archie Moore | World |
Moore was stripped of the NBA title for inactivity but retained the NYSAC and EBU versions.
| 1960-10-25 | 1962-02-09 | (United States) Archie Moore | NYSAC/EBU |
Moore was stripped of the EBU and NYSAC titles for inactivity.
| 1961-02-07 | 1962-05-12 | (United States) Harold Johnson | NBA |
| 1962-05-12 | 1963-06-01 | (United States) Harold Johnson | World |
| 1963-06-01 | 1965-03-30 | (United States) Willie Pastrano | WBA/WBC |
| 1965-03-30 | 1966-12-16 | (United States) José Louis Torres | WBA/WBC |
| 1966-12-16 | 1968-05-24 | (Nigeria) Dick Tiger | WBA/WBC |
| 1968-05-24 | 1970-12-09 (Stripped of WBA Championship) | (United States) Bob Foster | WBA/WBC |
| 1972-04-07 | 1974-06-17 (Vacated WBA Championship) | (United States) Bob Foster | WBA/WBC |
| 1984-02-25 | 1985-06-06 (Vacated WBC Championship WBC Championship) | (United States) Michael Spinks | WBA/WBC/IBF |
| 1999-06-05 | 2003-03-01 (Vacated IBF Championship) | (United States) Roy Jones Jr. | WBA/WBC/IBF |
| 2024-10-12 | 2025-02-22 | (Canada) Artur Beterbiev | WBA/WBC/IBF/WBO |
| 2025-02-22 | 2025-04-07 (Vacated WBC Championship) | (Russia) Dmitry Bivol | WBA/WBC/IBF/WBO |
WBC Champions
Title inaugurated
| 1963-06-01 | 1965-03-30 | (United States) Willie Pastrano | WBC |
| 1965-05-30 | 1966-12-16 | (United States) José Louis Torres | WBC |
| 1966-12-16 | 1968-05-24 | (Nigeria) Dick Tiger | WBC |
| 1968-05-24 | 1974-06-17-Vacated | (United States) Bob Foster | WBC |
| 1974-10-01 | 1977-05-21-Stripped | (United Kingdom) John Conteh | WBC |
| 1977-05-21 | 1978-01-07 | (Argentina) Miguel Angel Cuello | WBC |
| 1978-01-07 | 1978-12-02 | (Socialist Federal Republic of Yugoslavia) Mate Parlov | WBC |
| 1978-12-02 | 1979-04-22 | (United States) Marvin Johnson | WBC |
| 1979-04-22 | 1981-12-19 | (United States) Matthew Saad Muhammad | WBC |
| 1981-12-19 | 1983-03-18 | (United States) Dwight Muhammad Qawi | WBC |
| 1983-03-18 | 1985-06-06-Vacated | (United States) Michael Spinks | WBC |
| 1985-12-10 | 1986-04-30 | (United States) JB Williamson | WBC |
| 1986-04-30 | 1987-03-07 | (United Kingdom) Dennis Andries | WBC |
| 1987-03-07 | 1987-Vacated | (United States) Thomas Hearns | WBC |
| 1987-11-27 | 1988-11-07 | (Canada) Donny Lalonde | WBC |
| 1988-11-07 | 1989-Vacated | (United States) Sugar Ray Leonard | WBC |
| 1989-02-21 | 1989-06-24 | (United Kingdom) Dennis Andries | WBC |
| 1989-06-24 | 1990-07-28 | (Australia) Jeff Harding | WBC |
| 1990-07-28 | 1991-09-11 | (United Kingdom) Dennis Andries | WBC |
| 1991-09-11 | 1994-07-23 | (Australia) Jeff Harding | WBC |
| 1994-07-23 | 1995-06-16 | (Jamaica) Mike McCallum | WBC |
| 1995-06-16 | 1997-03-Vacated | (France) Fabrice Tiozzo | WBC |
| 1997-03 | 1997-03-21 | (United States) Roy Jones Jr. | WBC |
| 1997-03-21 | 1997-08-07 | (United States) Montell Griffin | WBC |
| 1997-08-07 | 2003-03-01-Vacated | (United States) Roy Jones Jr. | WBC |
| 1998-03-21 | 2000-04-15 | (Germany) Graciano Rocchigiani | WBC |
| 2003-04-23 | 2003-11-08 | (United States) Antonio Tarver | WBC |
| 2003-11-08 | 2004-05-15 | (United States) Roy Jones Jr. | WBC |
| 2004-05-15 | 2004-12-Stripped | (United States) Antonio Tarver | WBC |
| 2005-05-21 | 2007-02-03 | (Poland) Tomasz Adamek | WBC |
| 2007-02-03 | 2008-07-11-Stripped | (United States) Chad Dawson | WBC |
| 2008-07-11 | 2009-06-19 | (Romania) Adrian Diaconu | WBC |
| 2009-06-19 | 2011-05-21 | (Canada) Jean Pascal | WBC |
| 2011-05-21 | 2012-04-28 | (United States) Bernard Hopkins | WBC |
| 2012-04-28 | 2013-06-08 | (United States) Chad Dawson | WBC |
| 2013-06-08 | 2018-12-01 | (Canada) Adonis Stevenson | WBC |
| 2018-12-01 | 2019-10-18 | (Ukraine) Oleksandr Gvozdyk | WBC |
| 2019-10-18 | 2025-02-22 | (Canada) Artur Beterbiev | WBC |
| 2025-02-22 | 2025-04-07-Vacated | (Russia) Dmitry Bivol | WBC |
| 2025-04-07 | Present | (United States) David Benavidez | WBC |
WBA
Title inaugurated
| 1963-06-01 | 1965-03-30 | (United States) Willie Pastrano | WBA |
| 1965-03-30 | 1966-12-16 | (United States) José Louis Torres | WBA |
| 1966-12-16 | 1968-05-24 | (Nigeria) Dick Tiger | WBA |
| 1968-05-24 | 1970-12-09-Stripped | (United States) Bob Foster | WBA |
| 1971-02-27 | 1972-04-07 | (Venezuela) Vicente Rondon | WBA |
| 1972-04-07 | 1974-09-16-Vacated | (United States) Bob Foster | WBA |
| 1974-12-07 | 1978-09-15 | (Argentina) Victor Galindez | WBA |
| 1978-09-15 | 1979-04-14 | (United States) Mike Rossman | WBA |
| 1979-04-14 | 1979-11-30 | (Argentina) Victor Galindez | WBA |
| 1979-11-30 | 1980-03-31 | (United States) Marvin Johnson | WBA |
| 1980-03-31 | 1981-07-18 | (United States) Eddie Mustafa Muhammad | WBA |
| 1981-07-18 | 1985-09-21-Vacated | (United States) Michael Spinks | WBA |
| 1986-02-09 | 1987-05-23 | (United States) Marvin Johnson | WBA |
| 1987-05-23 | 1987-09-05 | (Trinidad and Tobago) Leslie Stewart | WBA |
| 1987-09-05 | 1991-06-03 | (United States) Virgil Hill | WBA |
| 1991-06-03 | 1992-03-20 | (United States) Thomas Hearns | WBA |
| 1992-03-20 | 1992-Vacated | (United States) Iran Barkley | WBA |
| 1992-09-29 | 1997-06-13 | (United States) Virgil Hill | WBA |
| 1997-06-13 | 1997-07-01-Vacated | (Poland) Dariusz Michalczewski | WBA |
| 1997-09-20 | 1998-07-18 | (United States) Lou Del Valle | WBA |
| 1998-07-18 | 2004-05-15 | (United States) Roy Jones Jr. | WBA Super Champion |
| 2001-12-22 | 2003-03-08 | (France) Bruno Girard | WBA Regular Champion |
| 2003-03-08 | 2003-10-10 | (France) Mehdi Sahnoune | WBA Regular Champion |
| 2003-10-10 | 2004-03-20 | (Italy) Silvio Branco | WBA Regular Champion |
| 2004-03-20 | 2006-10-19-Retired | (France) Fabrice Tiozzo | WBA Regular Champion |
| 2004-05-15 | 2004-12-Stripped | (United States) Antonio Tarver | WBA Super Champion |
| 2006-10-19 | 2007-04-28 | (Italy) Silvio Branco | WBA |
| 2007-04-28 | 2007-12-16 | (Croatia) Stipe Drvis | WBA |
| 2007-12-16 | 2008-03-25-Retired | (Australia) Danny Green | WBA |
| 2008-07-03 | 2009-06-20 | (Argentina) Hugo Garay | WBA |
| 2009-06-20 | 2010-01-29 | (Spain) Gabriel Campillo | WBA |
| 2010-01-29 | 2014-04-19 | (Kazakhstan) Beibut Shumenov | WBA Super Champion |
| 2013-12-14 | 2016-10-01 | (Germany) Juergen Braehmer | WBA Regular Champion |
| 2014-04-19 | 2014-11-08 | (United States) Bernard Hopkins | WBA Super Champion |
| 2014-11-08 | 2016-11-19 | (Russia) Sergey Kovalev | WBA Super Champion |
| 2016-10-01 | 2017-08-26 | (United Kingdom) Nathan Cleverly | WBA Regular Champion |
| 2016-11-19 | 2017-09-21-Vacated | (United States) Andre Ward | WBA Super Champion |
| 2017-08-26 | 2017-09-21-Elevated | (Sweden) Badou Jack | WBA Regular Champion |
| 2017-09-21 | 2017-09-23-Vacated | (Sweden) Badou Jack | WBA Champion |
| 2017-09-23 | 2024-10-12 | (Russia) Dmitry Bivol | WBA Super Champion |
| 2019-10-10 | 2021-07-09-Stripped | (Canada) Jean Pascal | WBA Regular Champion |
| 2024-08-03 | 2025-02-01 | (Cuba) David Morrell Jr. | WBA Regular Champion |
| 2024-10-12 | 2025-02-22 | (Canada) Artur Beterbiev | WBA Super Champion |
| 2025-02-01 | Present | (United States) David Benavidez | WBA Regular Champion |
| 2025-02-22 | Present | (Russia) Dmitry Bivol | WBA Super Champion |
IBF
Title inaugurated
| 1984-02-25 | 1985-09-21-Vacated | (United States) Michael Spinks | IBF |
| 1985-12-21 | 1986-09-06 | (Socialist Federal Republic of Yugoslavia) Slobodan Kačar | IBF |
| 1986-09-06 | 1987-10-29 | (United States) Bobby Czyz | IBF |
| 1987-10-29 | 1993-03-20 | (United States) Charles Williams | IBF |
| 1993-03-20 | 1996-11-23 | (Germany) Henry Maske | IBF |
| 1996-11-23 | 1997-06-13 | (United States) Virgil Hill | IBF |
| 1997-06-13 | 1997-06-16-Vacated | (Poland) Dariusz Michalczewski | IBF |
| 1997-07-19 | 1998-02-06 | (United States) William Guthrie | IBF |
| 1998-02-06 | 1999-06-05 | (United States) Reggie Johnson | IBF |
| 1999-06-05 | 2003-03-01-Vacated | (United States) Roy Jones Jr. | IBF |
| 2003-04-26 | 2003-11-08-Stripped | (United States) Antonio Tarver | IBF |
| 2004-02-06 | 2004-12-Vacated | (Jamaica) Glen Johnson | IBF |
| 2005-03-04 | 2008-04-12 | (United Kingdom) Clinton Woods | IBF |
| 2008-04-12 | 2008-10-11 | (United States) Antonio Tarver | IBF |
| 2008-10-11 | 2009-05-27-Vacated | (United States) Chad Dawson | IBF |
| 2009-08-28 | 2013-03-09 | (United States) Tavoris Cloud | IBF |
| 2013-03-09 | 2014-11-08 | (United States) Bernard Hopkins | IBF |
| 2014-11-08 | 2016-11-19 | (Russia) Sergey Kovalev | IBF |
| 2016-11-19 | 2017-09-21-Vacated | (United States) Andre Ward | IBF |
| 2017-11-11 | 2025-02-22 | (Canada) Artur Beterbiev | IBF |
| 2025-02-22 | Present | (Russia) Dmitry Bivol | IBF |
WBO
Title inaugurated
| 1988-12-03 | 1990-12-15-Vacated | (United States) Michael Moorer | WBO |
| 1991-05-09 | 1994-09-10 | (United States) Leeonzer Barber | WBO |
| 1994-09-10 | 2003-10-18 | (Poland) Dariusz Michalczewski | WBO |
| 2003-10-18 | 2004-01-17 | (Mexico) Julio César González | WBO |
| 2004-01-17 | 2009-11-Vacated | (Hungary) Zsolt Erdei | WBO |
| 2009-11-13 | 2011-05-19-Stripped | (Germany) Jürgen Brähmer | WBO |
| 2011-05-19 | 2013-08-17 | (United Kingdom) Nathan Cleverly | WBO |
| 2013-08-17 | 2016-11-19 | (Russia) Sergey Kovalev | WBO |
| 2016-11-19 | 2017-09-21-Vacated | (United States) Andre Ward | WBO |
| 2017-11-25 | 2018-08-04 | (Russia) Sergey Kovalev | WBO |
| 2018-08-04 | 2019-02-02 | (Colombia) Eleider Álvarez | WBO |
| 2019-02-02 | 2019-11-02 | (Russia) Sergey Kovalev | WBO |
| 2019-11-02 | 2019-12-17 Vacated | (Mexico) Canelo Álvarez | WBO |
| 2021-04-10 | 2022-06-18 | (United States) Joe Smith Jr. | WBO |
| 2022-06-18 | 2025-02-22 | (Canada) Artur Beterbiev | WBO |
| 2025-02-22 | Present | (Russia) Dmitry Bivol | WBO |

== See also ==
- List of British world boxing champions
