= Sven Ottke =

German boxer (born 1967)

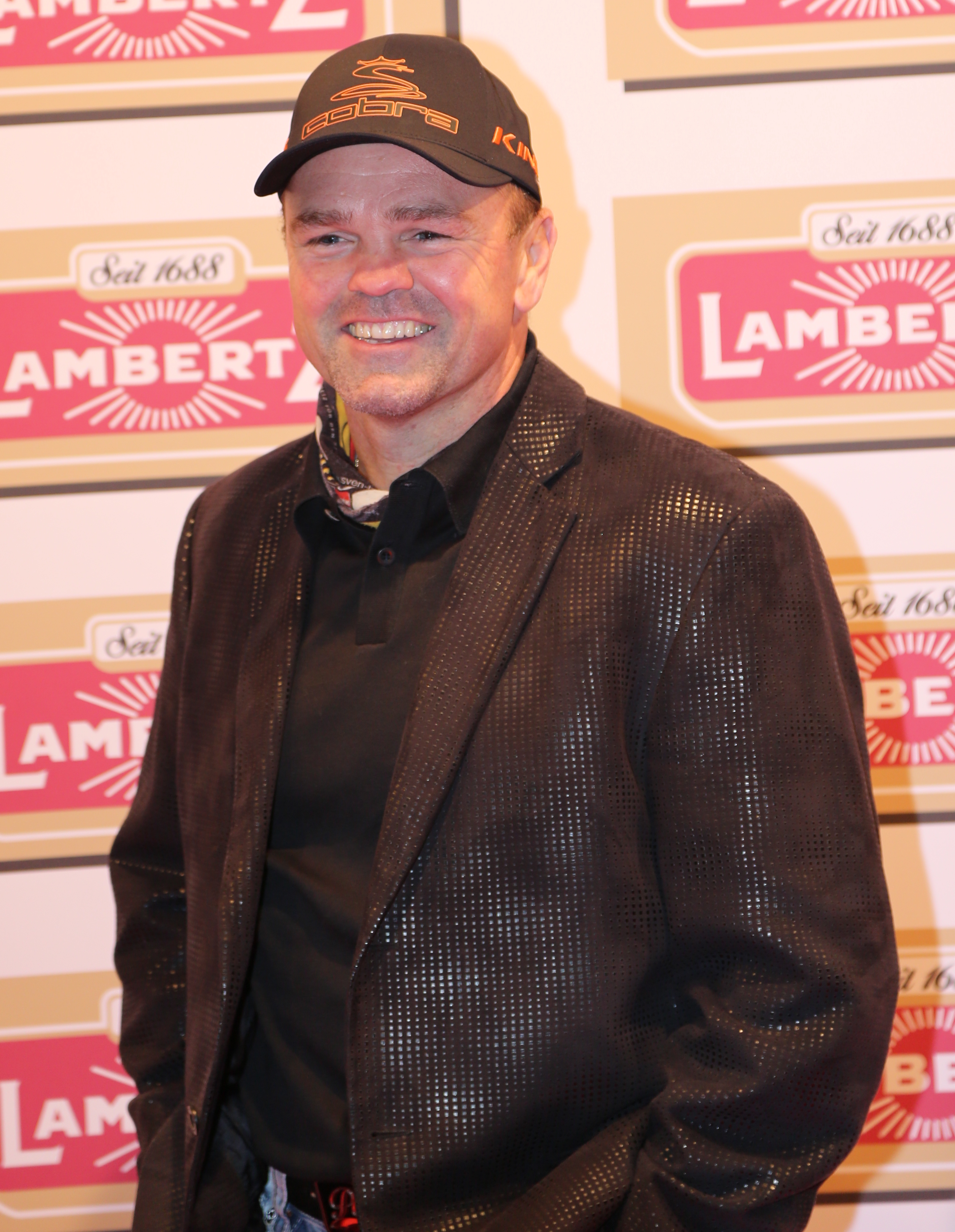
- Ottke in 2017
- Born: 3 June 1967 (age 59); Berlin-Spandau, West Berlin, West Germany
- Other names: The Phantom
- Nationality: German
- Height: 1.78 m (5 ft 10 in)
- Division: Super-middleweight; Light-heavyweight
- Reach: 175 cm (69 in)
- Stance: Orthodox
- Fighting out of: Karlsruhe, Germany
- Trainer: Ulli Wegner
- Years active: 1985–2004

Professional boxing record
- Total: 34
- Wins: 34
- By knockout: 6

Amateur record
- Total: 308
- Wins: 256
- Losses: 47
- Draws: 5

Other information
- Boxing record from BoxRec

Sven Ottke (born 3 June 1967) is a German former professional boxer who competed from 1997 to 2004. He was a unified super-middleweight world champion, having held the IBF title from 1998 to 2004, and the WBA (Unified) title from 2003 to 2004. With 21 successful title defences, Ottke was the fourth European boxer to retire as an undefeated world champion, after Jack McAuliffe, Terry Marsh, and Michael Loewe; Joe Calzaghe later became the fifth. Ottke defended the title against 20 boxers, a record in the super-middleweight division shared with Joe Calzaghe. As an amateur, Ottke won a bronze medal in the middleweight division at the 1989 World Championships.

== Early life ==
Sven Ottke was born in Spandau, West Berlin. He served two apprenticeships as a plasterer and industrial clerk. He became a member of the boxing club Spandauer BC 26 Berlin at the age of 14.

== Amateur career ==
He rebutted his critics, who had contended that he had started too late, when he became German Champion at the age of 18 at Middleweight. Ten further titles would follow. He took part in the 1988, 1992 and 1996 Olympic Games. He became European Champion in 1991 and 1996, and came third in 1993.

Ottke held amateur wins over Antonio Tarver, Chris Byrd, Michael Moorer, Zsolt Erdei and Juan Carlos Gómez.

- Amateur Record: 256-47-5
- German Middleweight Champion (FRG) 1985–1989
- German National Middleweight Champion (1990–1991, 1995–1996)
- German National Light Heavyweight Champion (1992–1993)
- Three time Olympian

Ottke finished his amateur career with a record of 256 wins, 47 losses (at least 4 by knockout), and 5 draws. As in his professional career, he spent most of his amateur career within Germany. Ottke failed to pass the quarterfinals of the few World Championships and Olympic games he participated in, apart from the Moscow 1989, where he dropped out of the semifinals.

== Professional career ==
After 308 fights as an amateur, of which he won 256, he turned professional in 1997. Less than a year later on 24 October 1998, he won the IBF super middleweight championship from Charles Brewer via a disputed decision victory. After this he made 16 successful defenses of his IBF title against fighters such as Thomas Tate (twice), Glen Johnson, Silvio Branco, James Butler, Anthony Mundine, Charles Brewer in a rematch, and a controversial points win against Robin Reid. He was at the peak of his career when he won the WBA title on 13 March 2003 against WBA champion Byron Mitchell, winning by split points decision.

After successfully defending his title 21 times, Ottke stepped down as undefeated world champion on 27 March 2004. Ottke has a record of 34 wins and 0 losses as a professional, of which 6 were by knockout. He was named IBF "Fighter of the Year" in 2003.

Ottke was a durable and attritional fighter, with most of his wins coming by points decisions rather than knockout.

Notably, Ottke refused to defend his title outside Germany, and referees and ringside officials were often German. It has been alleged that both the refereeing and some of the points decisions were corrupt and biased, with many commentators in the Reid fight, in particular, commenting that it was some of the worst refereeing that they had seen and alleged corrupt judging being the only reason Ottke kept his title. Reid had stated his intention to pursue a rematch against old foe Joe Calzaghe if he were to win; the latter, holding the WBO belt, called out Ottke instead for a unification title match, but Ottke took only one more fight and then retired.

=== Planned comeback ===
In May 2008, a comeback was planned against Dariusz Michalczewski in Germany, but the match never materialized.

== Professional boxing record ==
| 34 fights | 34 wins | 0 losses |
|---|---|---|
| By knockout | 6 | 0 |
| By decision | 27 | 0 |
| By disqualification | 1 | 0 |

| No. | Result | Record | Opponent | Type | Round, time | Date | Location | Notes |
|---|---|---|---|---|---|---|---|---|
| 34 | Win | 34–0 | Armand Krajnc | UD | 12 | 27 Mar 2004 | Bördelandhalle, Magdeburg, Germany | Retained WBA (Unified) and IBF super-middleweight titles |
| 33 | Win | 33–0 | Robin Reid | UD | 12 | 13 Dec 2003 | Nuremberg Arena, Nuremberg, Germany | Retained WBA (Unified) and IBF super-middleweight titles |
| 32 | Win | 32–0 | Mads Larsen | MD | 12 | 6 Sep 2003 | Messe, Erfurt, Germany | Retained WBA (Unified) and IBF super-middleweight titles |
| 31 | Win | 31–0 | David Starie | UD | 12 | 14 Jun 2003 | Bördelandhalle, Magdeburg, Germany | Retained WBA (Unified) and IBF super-middleweight titles |
| 30 | Win | 30–0 | Byron Mitchell | SD | 12 | 15 Mar 2003 | Max-Schmeling-Halle, Berlin, Germany | Retained IBF super-middleweight title; Won WBA (Unified) super-middleweight title |
| 29 | Win | 29–0 | Rudy Markussen | UD | 12 | 16 Nov 2002 | Nuremberg Arena, Nuremberg, Germany | Retained IBF super-middleweight title |
| 28 | Win | 28–0 | Joe Gatti | TKO | 9 (12), 2:43 | 24 Aug 2002 | Arena Leipzig, Leipzig, Germany | Retained IBF super-middleweight title |
| 27 | Win | 27–0 | Thomas Tate | UD | 12 | 1 Jun 2002 | Nuremberg Arena, Nuremberg, Germany | Retained IBF super-middleweight title |
| 26 | Win | 26–0 | Rick Thornberry | UD | 12 | 16 Mar 2002 | Bördelandhalle, Magdeburg, Germany | Retained IBF super-middleweight title |
| 25 | Win | 25–0 | Anthony Mundine | KO | 10 (12) | 1 Dec 2001 | Westfalenhallen, Dortmund, Germany | Retained IBF super-middleweight title |
| 24 | Win | 24–0 | James Butler | UD | 12 | 1 Sep 2001 | Bördelandhalle, Magdeburg, Germany | Retained IBF super-middleweight title |
| 23 | Win | 23–0 | Ali Ennebati | TKO | 11 (12), 2:28 | 29 Jun 2001 | Nuremberg Arena, Nuremberg, Germany | Retained IBF super-middleweight title |
| 22 | Win | 22–0 | James Crawford | KO | 8 (12), 2:52 | 24 Mar 2001 | Bördelandhalle, Magdeburg, Germany | Retained IBF super-middleweight title |
| 21 | Win | 21–0 | Silvio Branco | UD | 12 | 16 Dec 2000 | Europahalle, Karlsruhe, Germany | Retained IBF super-middleweight title |
| 20 | Win | 20–0 | Charles Brewer | SD | 12 | 2 Sep 2000 | Bördelandhalle, Magdeburg, Germany | Retained IBF super-middleweight title |
| 19 | Win | 19–0 | Tocker Pudwill | UD | 12 | 3 Jun 2000 | Europahalle, Karlsruhe, Germany | Retained IBF super-middleweight title |
| 18 | Win | 18–0 | Lloyd Brian | UD | 12 | 11 Mar 2000 | Bördelandhalle, Magdeburg, Germany | Retained IBF super-middleweight title |
| 17 | Win | 17–0 | Glen Johnson | UD | 12 | 27 Nov 1999 | Philips Halle, Düsseldorf, Germany | Retained IBF super-middleweight title |
| 16 | Win | 16–0 | Thomas Tate | TD | 11 (12), 0:25 | 4 Sep 1999 | Bördelandhalle, Magdeburg, Germany | Retained IBF super-middleweight title; Unanimous TD: Ottke cut from an accidental head clash |
| 15 | Win | 15–0 | Gabriel Hernández | UD | 12 | 8 May 1999 | Philips Halle, Düsseldorf, Germany | Retained IBF super-middleweight title |
| 14 | Win | 14–0 | Giovanni Nardiello | KO | 3 (12), 2:30 | 27 Feb 1999 | Max-Schmeling-Halle, Berlin, Germany | Retained IBF super-middleweight title |
| 13 | Win | 13–0 | Charles Brewer | SD | 12 | 24 Oct 1998 | Düsseldorf, Germany | Won IBF super-middleweight title |
| 12 | Win | 12–0 | William Krijnen | UD | 10 | 22 Aug 1998 | Leipzig Trade Fair, Leipzig, Germany | |
| 11 | Win | 11–0 | Asmir Vojnović | UD | 12 | 30 May 1998 | Riesa, Germany | Won WBC International light-heavyweight title |
| 10 | Win | 10–0 | Stephane Nizard | UD | 8 | 21 Mar 1998 | Max-Schmeling-Halle, Berlin, Germany | |
| 9 | Win | 9–0 | Allen Smith | DQ | 5 | 28 Feb 1998 | Westfalenhallen, Dortmund, Germany | |
| 8 | Win | 8–0 | Ali Saidi | UD | 10 | 13 Dec 1997 | Düsseldorf, Germany | Won German light-heavyweight title |
| 7 | Win | 7–0 | Roman Babaev | UD | 8 | 18 Oct 1997 | Vienna, Austria | |
| 6 | Win | 6–0 | Fermin Chirino | UD | 6 | 30 Aug 1997 | Max-Schmeling-Halle, Berlin, Germany | |
| 5 | Win | 5–0 | Yuri Filipko | UD | 8 | 22 Jun 1997 | Cologne, Germany | |
| 4 | Win | 4–0 | Andy Flute | UD | 6 | 1 Jun 1997 | Riesa, Germany | |
| 3 | Win | 3–0 | Teymuraz Kekelidze | PTS | 6 | 26 Apr 1997 | Leipzig, Germany | |
| 2 | Win | 2–0 | Jason Hart | TKO | 2 (6), 1:44 | 13 Apr 1997 | Cologne, Germany | |
| 1 | Win | 1–0 | Eric Davis | PTS | 6 | 22 Mar 1997 | Max-Schmeling-Halle, Berlin, Germany | |

== Television viewership ==
=== Germany ===
| Date | Fight | Viewership (avg.) | Source(s) |
|---|---|---|---|
| 16 December 2000 | Sven Ottke vs. Silvio Branco | 4,940,000 | |
| 24 March 2001 | Sven Ottke vs. James Crawford | 5,310,000 | |
| 24 August 2002 | Sven Ottke vs. Joe Gatti | 4,460,000 | |
| 15 March 2003 | Sven Ottke vs. Byron Mitchell | 7,950,000 | |
| 13 December 2003 | Sven Ottke vs. Robin Reid | 6,990,000 | |
| | Total viewership | 29,650,000 | |

Sporting positions
Regional boxing titles
| Preceded by Ali Saidi | German light-heavyweight champion 13 December 1997 – October 1998; Vacated | Vacant Title next held by Thomas Ulrich |
| Preceded by Asmir Vojnovic | WBC International light-heavyweight champion 30 May 1998 – October 1998; Vacated | Vacant Title next held by Yawe Davis |
World boxing titles
| Preceded by Charles Brewer | IBF super-middleweight champion 24 October 1998 – 27 March 2004; Retired | Vacant Title next held by Jeff Lacy |
| New title Unified against Byron Mitchell | WBA super-middleweight champion Unified title 15 March 2003 – 27 March 2004; Retired | Vacant Title next held by Mikkel Kessler |
