= Romani people in Italy =

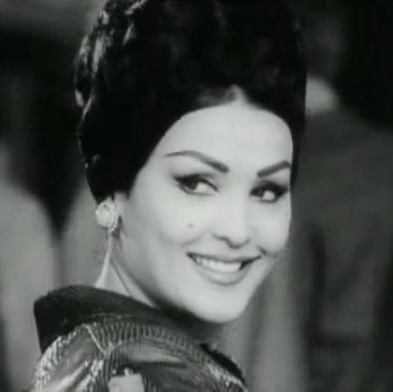
Moira Orfei

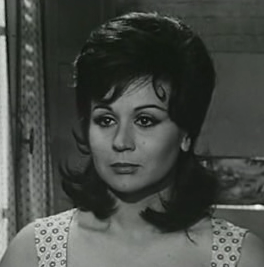
Liana Orfei

Total population
- 150,000 (ISTAT: 2015)

Regions with significant populations
- Campania: Lazio; Lombardy; Piedmont

Languages
- Italian; Romani (Sinte Romani, Balkan Romani)

Religion
- Roman Catholicism; Cultural Muslims; Romani mythology

Romani people in Italy (Italian: Rom in Italia) have been living in Italy since the 15th century. The Sinti, a Romani subgroup, arrived from the north. Others migrated from the Balkans and settled in Southern Italy and Central Italy. Muslim Roma migrated to Italy from Bosnia and Kosovo at the time of the Balkan wars.

== Numbers ==
In 2015 in Italy there are at about 150,000 (70,000 Italian citizens) of Romani origins. The three cities with most number of Romanis are: Rome, Milan and Naples.

== Life in Italy ==
According to a May 2008 poll, 68% of Italians wanted to see all of the country's approximately 150,000 Romanis, many of whom were Italian citizens, expelled. The survey, published as mobs in Naples burned down Romani camps that month, revealed that the majority also wanted all Romani camps in Italy to be demolished.

A 2015 poll conducted by Pew Research found that 86% of Italians have unfavourable views of Romani people.

On June 18, 2018, Minister of the Interior Matteo Salvini announced the government would conduct a census of Romani people in Italy for the purpose of deporting all who are not in the country legally. However this measure was criticized as unconstitutional and was opposed by all the oppositions and also by some members of the M5S.

Romani children in Italy face human trafficking and are forced into labor activities like begging, pickpocketing, or minor theft. Additionally, Roma and Sinti boys are exploited through sex trafficking and prostitution in Italy.

Many robberies, theft, scams and criminal activity in Italy are frequently committed by Romani individuals. These offenders frequently focus on Italy's tourists given Italy's substantial visitor numbers.

== Antiziganism in Italy ==
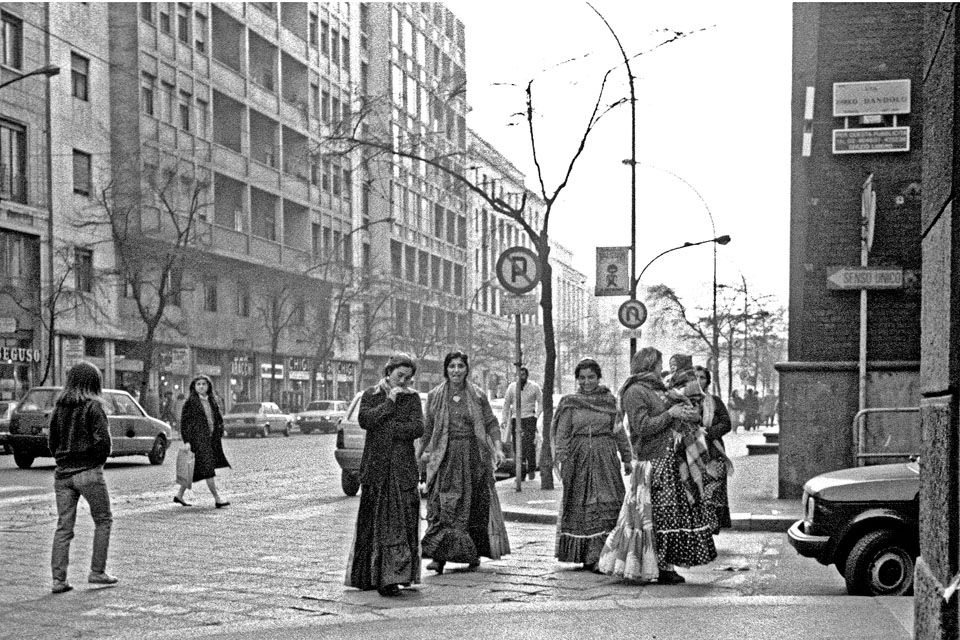
Roma women in Milan in 1984

Anti-Roma sentiment is widespread in Italy, and it consists of hostility, prejudice, and discrimination against the Roma people (Gypsies or "Zingari"). There is no reliable data regarding the total number of Roma people who live in Italy, but estimates put it between 140,000 and 170,000.

In Italy in 2007 and 2008, many national and local political leaders engaged in rhetoric which stated that the extraordinary rise in crime at the time was mainly due to the uncontrolled immigration of people of Roma origin from Romania which had recently become a European Union member state. National and local leaders announced their plans to expel Roma from settlements which were located both in and around major cities as well as their plans to deport illegal immigrants. In May 2007, the mayors of Rome and Milan signed "Security Pacts" which "envisaged the forcible eviction of up to 10,000 Romani people".

In October 2007, an extraordinarily high level of anti-immigrant sentiment exploded into violence which was generally directed against Romanian immigrants and was specifically directed against Roma immigrants. The violence was triggered by the murder of 47-year-old Giovanna Reggiani, a naval captain's wife, which was attributed to a Romanian immigrant of Roma origin. Reggiani was raped, beaten, left in a ditch, and died the following week. The Italian government responded by rounding up Romanian immigrants and summarily expelling some two hundred of them, mostly Roma, in defiance of E.U. immigration rules. According to the then Mayor of Rome Walter Veltroni, Romanians of Roma origin made up 75 percent of those who raped, stole and killed in the first seven months of the year.

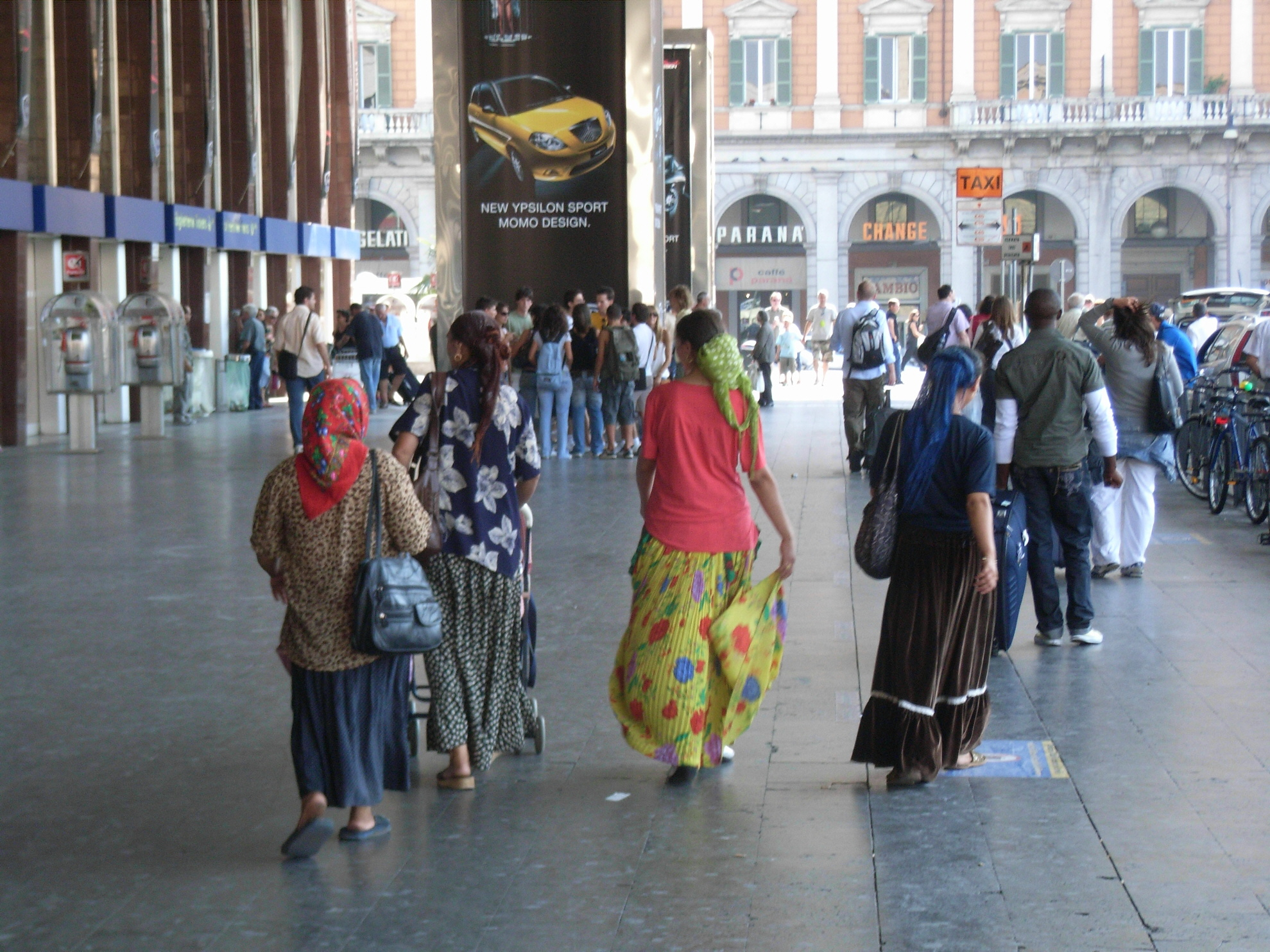
Roma women at Roma Termini railway station in 2007

The Greater Romania Party announced on 8 November 2007 that it would withdraw its five members from the Identity, Tradition, Sovereignty political group on 12 November 2007 over comments made by Alessandra Mussolini regarding the expulsion of Romanian criminals from Italy in early November 2007, thus dooming the European parliamentary group to falter less than a year after its creation. According to Romanian MEP and former ITS deputy chairman Eugen Mihaescu the final straw was the "unacceptable amalgam" Mussolini made between criminal gypsies and the entire Romanian population.

In May 2008, an unnamed 16-year-old Roma Romanian girl who was from a different part of town was arrested for trying to snatch an unattended six-month-old baby. After that mobs in several areas around Naples attacked Roma communities, setting homes alight, and forcing hundreds of Roma to flee. The camp in Ponticelli was set on fire each month between May and July 2008.

According to a May 2008 poll, 68% of Italians wanted to see all of the country's approximately 150,000 Gypsies, many of whom were Italian citizens, expelled. The survey, published as mobs in Naples burned down Gypsy camps that month, revealed that the majority also wanted all Gypsy camps in Italy to be demolished.

A 2015 poll conducted by Pew Research found that 86% of Italians have unfavorable views of Romani people. The 2019 poll of the same think-tank found that still 83% of Italians have negative views of Romani people, the highest percentage of European countries surveyed.

On June 18, 2018, Minister of the Interior Matteo Salvini announced the government would conduct a census of Romani people in Italy for the purpose of deporting all who are not in the country legally. However this measure was criticized as unconstitutional and was opposed by all the oppositions and also by some members of the M5S.

In 2023, the Italian chant of "attenzione pickpocket" has become an international viral sensation. Monica Poli, a city councilor representing the right-wing Lega party in Venice, alerted people by calling out pickpockets in the streets of the city; however, some social media users did not believe that the subjects of the videos were committing crimes every time she observed them and they also accused her of ethnically profiling Romani people based on stereotypes. Poli's group Cittadini Non Distratti – undistracted citizens – has existed for nearly 30 years but has only recently become viral after they created a TikTok account.

== Romanis in Italy ==
- Agostino Cardamone (1965), boxer
- Gigi Meroni (1943-1967), football player
- Moira Orfei (1931–2015), circus artist, actress
- Liana Orfei (1937), circus artist, actress
- Michele di Rocco (1982), professional boxer
- Domenico Spada, boxer

== See also ==
- Romani people in Romania
- Romani people in the Czech Republic
- Romani people in Turkey
- Romani people in Spain
- Romani people in Hungary
