= Thomas Hansvoll =

Norwegian boxer

Personal information
- Nationality: Norwegian
- Born: 26 June 1974 (age 52)
- Height: 186 cm (6 ft 1 in)

Boxing career
- Weight class: Light heavyweight Cruiserweight
- Stance: Southpaw

Boxing record
- Total fights: 32
- Wins: 26
- Win by KO: 8
- Losses: 4
- Draws: 2

Thomas Hansvoll (born 26 June 1974) is a retired Norwegian boxer in the light heavyweight and cruiserweight divisions.

As an amateur he represented the club IF Ørnulf and won Norwegian championships in 1993 and 1994.

He made his debut as a professional boxer on 11 November 1994. From 32 career bouts, he won 26, drew 2 and lost 4. He lost the World Boxing Association World Light Heavy Title match in 2002 against Bruno Girard. After winning the World Boxing Organisation Inter-Continental Cruiser Title in 2003 against Damon Reed, Hansvoll retired, only to make a brief comeback between 2006 and 2008.
