= Peter Oboh =

Nigerian/British boxer

Personal information
- Nationality: Nigerian; British
- Born: 6 September 1968 (age 58) Lagos, Nigeria
- Height: 6 ft 0 in (183 cm)
- Weight: Light heavyweight; Cruiserweight

Boxing career
- Stance: Southpaw

Boxing record
- Total fights: 19
- Wins: 14
- Win by KO: 12
- Losses: 5

Peter Oboh (born 6 September 1968 in Lagos) is a Nigerian born British former professional boxer who competed from 1993 to 2004. He held the British, Commonwealth and WBA Inter-Continental light heavyweight titles between 2002 and 2004.

== Professional boxing record ==
19 fights	14 wins	5 losses
By knockout	12	2
By decision	2	3

No.	Result	Record	Opponent	Type	Round, time	Date	Location	Notes
19	Win	14–5	(United Kingdom) Andrew Lowe	RTD	10 (12)	12 May 2004	(United Kingdom) Rivermead Leisure Centre, Reading, England	Retained WBA Inter-Continental, British, and Commonwealth light heavyweight titles
18	Win	13–5	(Latvia) Elvis Mihailenko	TKO	11 (12)	14 Nov 2003	(United Kingdom) York Hall, London, England	Won WBA Inter-Continental light heavyweight title
17	Win	12–5	(United Kingdom) Neil Simpson	TKO	11 (12)	8 Mar 2003	(United Kingdom) AT7 Centre, Coventry, England	Retained Commonwealth light heavyweight title; Won vacant British light heavyweight title
16	Win	11–5	(Kenya) George Adipo Odour	KO	1 (12)	6 Sep 2002	(United Kingdom) York Hall, London, England	Won vacant Commonwealth light heavyweight title
15	Win	10–5	(United Kingdom) Chris Davies	TKO	8 (10)	29 Jan 2001	(United Kingdom) Bushfield Leisure Centre, Peterborough, England	
14	Win	9–5	(Republic of Ireland) Ray Kane	TKO	2 (6)	21 Jul 1999	(United Kingdom) Royal National Hotel, London, England	
13	Win	8–5	(Norway) Thomas Hansvoll	TKO	2 (6)	18 Jun 1999	Idrattens Hus, Vejle, Denmark	
12	Loss	7–5	(United Kingdom) Terry Dunstan	PTS	8	21 Nov 1998	(United Kingdom) Elephant & Castle Centre, London, England	
11	Win	7–4	(Norway) Ole Klemetsen	KO	1 (8)	26 Sep 1998	(United Kingdom) Barbican Centre, York, England	
10	Loss	6–4	(United Kingdom) Johnny Nelson	RTD	6 (8)	18 Jul 1998	(United Kingdom) Sheffield Arena, Sheffield, England	
9	Loss	6–3	(United Kingdom) Scott Welch	PTS	6	1 Nov 1997	(United Kingdom) Kelvin Hall, Glasgow, Scotland	
8	Loss	6–2	(United Kingdom) Garry Delaney	DQ	8 (10)	4 Mar 1997	(United Kingdom) Elephant & Castle Centre, London, England	
7	Win	6–1	(United Kingdom) Andy Lambert	KO	1 (6)	3 Dec 1996	(United Kingdom) Everton Sports Centre, Liverpool, England	
6	Loss	5–1	(Democratic Republic of the Congo) Mohamed Siluvangi	TKO	6 (10)	27 Aug 1996	(United Kingdom) Blazers Night Club, Windsor, England	
5	Win	5–0	(Ukraine) Yuri Yelistratov	PTS	6	9 Jul 1996	(United Kingdom) York Hall, London, England	
4	Win	4–0	(United Kingdom) Tim Redman	RTD	2 (6)	16 Oct 1995	(United Kingdom) Marriott Hotel, London, England	
3	Win	3–0	(Italy) Antonio Pasqualino	TKO	2	13 May 1994	Avellino, Italy	
2	Win	2–0	(Tunisia) Ridha Soussi	PTS	6	14 Jan 1994	Tagliacozzo, Italy	
1	Win	1–0	(Italy) Antonio Russo	TKO	5	12 May 1993	(Italy) Cassino, Ital	
