= Nordin ben Salah =

Dutch boxer

Nordin ben Salah (18 May 1972, in M'Tioua – 20 September 2004, in Amsterdam) was a Dutch boxer and kickboxer. His boxing career record spanned from 1994 to 2003. In 39 bouts, he had 36 wins, 2 losses and 1 draw.

He was shot and killed by unknown assailants, after taking a train on the night of September 20, 2004, in Amsterdam. He was 32-years old.
