= Palais des Sports de Marseille =

Sports arena in Marseille, France

Coordinates: 43°16′14″N 5°24′05″E

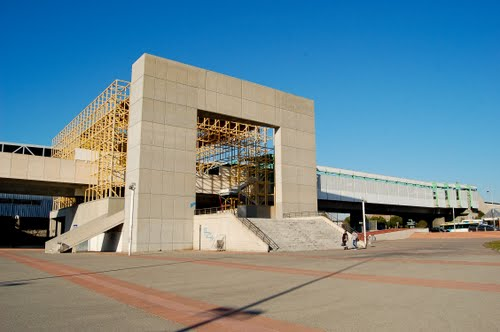
- Interactive map of Palais des Sports de Marseille
- Location: Marseille, Bouches-du-Rhône, Provence-Alpes-Côte d'Azur, France
- Owner: City of Marseille
- Operator: City of Marseille
- Capacity: 5,800 (basketball, handball)

Construction
- Groundbreaking: 1987
- Built: 1988
- Opened: 20 December 1988
- Architect: J.J. Letellier

Tenant
- Open 13 (250 series) (1993–present)

Palais des Sports de Marseille is a multi-purpose sports arena, located in Marseille, France. Its seating capacity varies between 4,200 and 7,200 spectators under different configurations. It was opened in 1988.
