= Dmitry Bivol vs. Trent Broadhurst =

Boxing match

Monte-Carlo Boxing Bonanza
- Date: 4 November 2017
- Venue: Casino de Salle Medcin, Monte Carlo, Monaco
- Title(s) on the line: WBA light heavyweight title

Tale of the tape
Boxer	Dmitry Bivol	Trent Broadhurst
Hometown	Saint Petersburg, Russia	Middlebrook, Queensland, Australia
Pre-fight record	11–0 (9 KO)	20–1 (12 KO)
Age	26 years, 10 months	29 years, 3 months
Height	6 ft 0 in (183 cm)	5 ft 10 in (178 cm)
Weight	174 1/4 lb (79 kg)	175 lb (79 kg)
Style	Orthodox	Orthodox
Recognition	WBA; Light Heavyweight Champion; TBRB; No. 8 Ranked Light Heavyweight; The Ring; No. 9 Ranked Light Heavyweight	WBA; No. 10 Ranked Light Heavyweight

Result
- Bivol wins via 1st-round TKO

Dmitry Bivol vs. Trent Broadhurst, billed as Monte-Carlo Boxing Bonanza, was a professional boxing match contested on 4 November 2017, for the WBA light-heavyweight championship. The bout took place at the Casino de Salle Medcin, with Bivol winning by technical knockout in the first round.

== Background ==
With the WBA's other two titles being vacated, interim champion Bivol was elevated to full champion. On 25 September 2017, it was announced that Bivol and Broadhurst would fight on 4 November 2017 at the Casino de Salle Medcin, Monte Carlo, live on Sky Sports and HBO. As interim champion, Bivol was ranked No. 1 by the WBA when the fight was announced, while Broadhurst was ranked No. 11. The announcement was met with incredulity by the media, due to many fighters ranked above Broadhurst being available. The WBA's No. 2 contender, Sullivan Barrera, took to Twitter to express his displeasure at being overlooked. The WBA's president, Gilberto Mendoza, later clarified that the winner of the bout will be ordered to fight the WBA's top contender within 120 days.

== Fight details ==
In the opening seconds, Bivol and Broadhurst exchanged jabs, boxing at range. Despite Broadhurst's apparent loss of footing, Referee Howard Foster ruled a slip as a knockdown and proceeded to administer a count. As the bell rang, Bivol landed a straight right hand, resulting in Broadhurst being knocked down for the second time. The referee intervened and halted the contest without initiating a count.

== Aftermath ==
In the post-fight interview, Bivol stated that he was prepared to make a mandatory defence against the WBA's number one ranked contender, Sullivan Barrera.

== Fight card ==
Confirmed bouts:

Weight Class		vs.		Method	Round	Time	Notes
Light-heavyweight	Dmitry Bivol (c)	def.	Trent Broadhurst	KO	1/12	3:00	^{Note 1}
Welterweight	Harlem Eubank	def.	Aboubeker Bechelaghem	SD	4/4
Heavyweight	Agit Kabayel (c)	def.	Derek Chisora	MD	12/12		^{Note 2}
Featherweight	Scott Quigg	def.	Oleg Yefimovych	TKO	6/12	0:50	^{Note 3}
Bantamweight	Jamie McDonnell (c)	vs.	Liborio Solís	NC	3/12	2:45	^{Note 4}
Preliminary bouts
Middleweight	Diego Natchoo	vs.	Ignazio Crivello	MD	6/6
Light-welterweight	Bastien Ballesta	def.	Pal Olah	UD	6/6

^Note 1 For WBA light-heavyweight title
^Note 2 For European heavyweight title
^Note 3 Final eliminator for WBA featherweight title
^Note 4 For WBA (Regular) bantamweight title

== Broadcasting ==
Country	Broadcasters	
Country	Free-to-air	Cable/Pay TV
France	L'Équipe	—N/a
Germany	Mitteldeutscher Rundfunk	—N/a
United Kingdom	—N/a	Sky Sports
United States	—N/a	HBO

Preceded by vs. Cedric Agnew	Dmitry Bivol's bouts 4 November 2017	Succeeded by vs. Sullivan Barrera
Preceded by vs. Nader Hamdan	Trent Broadhurst's bouts 4 November 2017	Succeeded by vs. Blake Caparello
