= Dmitry Bivol =

Russian boxer (born 1990)

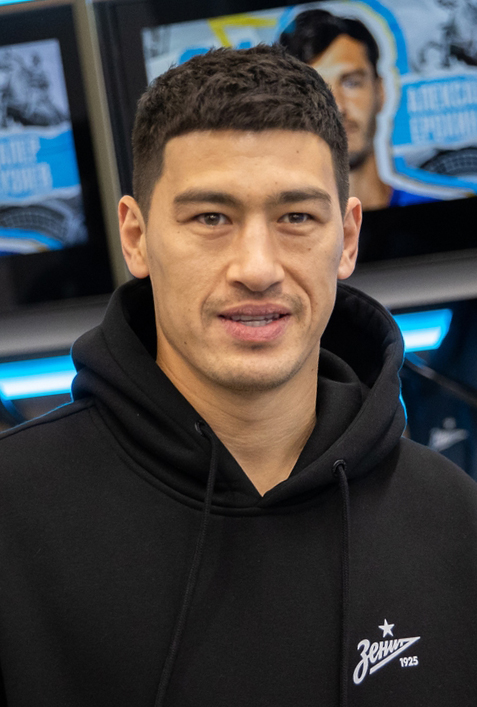
- Bivol in 2023

Personal information
- Native name: Дмитрий Юрьевич Бивол
- Citizenship: Kyrgyzstan; Russia
- Born: 18 December 1990 (age 35) Tokmok, Kirghiz SSR, Soviet Union
- Height: 6 ft 0 in (183 cm)
- Weight: Light-heavyweight

Boxing career
- Reach: 72 in (183 cm)
- Stance: Orthodox

Boxing record
- Total fights: 26
- Wins: 25
- Win by KO: 12
- Losses: 1
Medal record
Men's Amateur boxing
Representing Russia
World Combat Games
Gold medal – first place	2013 Saint Petersburg	Light heavyweight
Russian National Championships
Bronze medal – third place	2010 Saint Petersburg	Middleweight
Silver medal – second place	2011 Ufa	Middleweight
Gold medal – first place	2012 Syktyvkar	Light heavyweight
Gold medal – first place	2014 Rostov-on-Don	Light heavyweight
Summer Universiade
Silver medal – second place	2013 Kazan	Light-heavyweight
Youth World Championships
Bronze medal – third place	2008 Guadalajara	Middleweight
Cadet World Championships
Gold medal – first place	2006 Istanbul	Middleweight
Gold medal – first place	2007 Baku	Light heavyweight
European U22 Boxing Championships
Gold medal – first place	2012 Kaliningrad	Light-heavyweight
European Cadet Championships
Gold medal – first place	2006 Tirana	Middleweight
European School Championships
Gold medal – first place	2005 Tver	Light-middleweight

Dmitry Yuryevich Bivol (Russian: Дмитрий Юрьевич Бивол; born 18 December 1990) is a Kyrgyzstani-Russian professional boxer. He won the undisputed (Note: Four-belt era: World Boxing Association (WBA) (Super version), World Boxing Council (WBC), International Boxing Federation (IBF), and World Boxing Organization (WBO) titles.) light-heavyweight title in February 2025, and has held the unified (Note: Four-belt era: World Boxing Association (WBA) (Super version), International Boxing Federation (IBF), and World Boxing Organization (WBO) titles.) championship since April 2025, as well as the International Boxing Organization (IBO) and Ring magazine titles since February 2025. Previously, he held the World Boxing Association (WBA) light-heavyweight title (Super version) from 2019 to 2024. He also held the IBO title during his first reign as champion.

As an amateur, Bivol won the gold medal at the 2013 World Combat Games in the 81 kg weight category. He was listed by multiple sources as the fighter of the year for 2022, including being selected as The Ring magazine Fighter of The Year and as the Boxing Writers Association of America's Fighter of the Year. He is the only boxer to defeat two reigning undisputed world champions in the "four-belt era," with his victories over super-middleweight champion Canelo Álvarez and light-heavyweight champion Artur Beterbiev, though only his fight with Beterbiev was for the undisputed championship, as his fight with Álvarez was for the WBA light heavyweight title. He is also the first fighter to go the distance with Beterbiev, a feat he accomplished twice in a row, first losing by majority decision and then winning by majority decision.

== Early life ==
"It’s a great country. It’s not a rich country but it has great people, nice people. It’s my motherland. I love Kyrgyzstan. I love the culture and it’s different to Russia."

— Bivol on his homeland.

Dmitry Bivol's father, a Moldovan, was born in the Moldavian SSR, while his mother is an ethnic Korean born in the Kazakh SSR.

Bivol's parents moved to the Kirgiz SSR after graduating and marrying. He was born and raised in Tokmok, in what is now Kyrgyzstan, until the age of 11, when he moved to Saint Petersburg in the Russian Federation after the dissolution of the Soviet Union.

== Amateur career ==
Dmitry Bivol took up boxing at the age of six in Tokmok, Kyrgyzstan. Bivol was a naturally bigger kid and he weighed a lot compared to an average-size boy of his age. He explains how his confidence grew as he started to win over much older guys in his amateur bouts. Bivol was a decorated amateur, winning two world championships at the junior (U-17) level, as well as a bronze medal at the 2008 AIBA Youth World Boxing Championships in the middleweight division. Bivol won the Russian national amateur boxing championships in 2012 and 2014, as a light heavyweight. His record as an amateur is 268–15.

== Professional career ==
=== Early career ===
Bivol made his professional debut in November 2014. He won his first six fights by knockout. He sparred with Egor Mekhontsev, Jean Pascal, and Vyacheslav Shabranskyy early in his career. He lives in St. Petersburg but trains in Southern California.

=== WBA interim light heavyweight champion ===
Bivol won the interim WBA light heavyweight title on 21 May 2016, beating previously undefeated Felix Valera by unanimous decision (119–107, 119–107, 116–111). Bivol dominated Marcos Felix, dropping him twice with combinations. At the time, the WBA had three different world titles, with Bivol holding the lesser version of them. Bivol's first defense came against Robert Berridge on 23 February 2017. Bivol easily overcame Berridge, pummeling him over four rounds before a technical knockout stoppage. Berridge was knocked down in round 3. At the start of round 4, Bivol opened a cut over Berridge's right eye. Following another knockdown and with Berridge bleeding profusely, the ringside doctor stopped the fight. Bivol then defended his title against Samuel Clarkson on 14 April 2017. The fight headlined a ShoBox show at the MGM National Harbor in Maryland. Bivol once again won in dominant fashion, knocking Clarkson down twice in the first round, before dropping him once more with a short right hand midway through round 4. Although Clarkson got up, the referee stopped the fight, giving Bivol a TKO win.

Bivol sought to face WBA (Regular) champion Nathan Cleverly following his win over Clarkson. He appeared on the undercard of Ward-Kovalev II, in a non-title bout against Cedric Agnew. Agnew had previously lost to Clarkson. Bivol once again won quickly and emphatically, getting a 4th-round TKO for the third consecutive time. Agnew was dropped in the first round.

=== WBA light heavyweight champion ===
As interim champion, Bivol was Cleverly's mandatory challenger, but the WBA granted Cleverly an exception for him to face Badou Jack. After Jack defeated Cleverly, the WBA ordered a Jack–Bivol purse bid. However, following WBA (Super) and unified champion Andre Ward's retirement, Jack decided to vacate his title, presumably to pursue one of the other vacant titles previously held by Ward.

==== Bivol vs. Broadhurst ====
With the WBA's other two titles being vacated, interim champion Bivol was elevated to full champion. He was scheduled to fight Trent Broadhurst on an optional defense on 4 November 2017 at the Salle des Etoiles. As interim champion, Dmitry Bivol was ranked No. 1 by the WBA when the fight was announced, while Broadhurst was ranked No. 11. The announcement was met with incredulity by the media, due to many fighters ranked above Broadhurst being available. The WBA's No. 2 contender, Sullivan Barrera, took to Twitter to express his displeasure at being overlooked. The WBA's president, Gilberto Mendoza, later clarified that the winner of the bout will be ordered to fight the WBA's top contender within 120 days. Bivol won the fight by knockout with a clean right-handed shot at the end of the first round. The live broadcast of the fight averaged 341,000 viewers on HBO, while a same-day replay averaged 289,000 viewers.

==== Bivol vs. Barrera ====
Next Bivol faced the toughest test of his career on 3 March 2018 and dominated Sullivan Barrera (21–2, 14 KO) and stopped him in the 12th and final round. Bivol was able to outbox and out-punch Barrera throughout the fight, then exploded suddenly with a massive right hand that put the Cuban down halfway into the final frame. Barrera did get up, but referee Harvey Dock stopped the fight for the TKO at 1:41. Bivol received a cut over his right eye early in the bout, and a haematoma that developed over his left eye as the fight went on. Both came from accidental clashes of heads. The fight was part of a doubleheader which saw Sergey Kovalev successfully defend his WBO title against Igor Mikhalkin. The card was confirmed in December 2017. After the fight, Bivol said through a translator, “I felt a little bit like an amateur tonight, it was a really great opponent. Barrera showed me a lot of things tonight, and I have to work on a lot of things. Thanks, Sullivan. I was a little bit reserved. I was thinking how much I need to go the rest of the fight, but in the 12th round, I knew I could knock him out. I stepped on the gas, and the knockout came.”

Bivol landed 244 of 778 (31%) of his punches, including 146 of 378 (39%) power shots, compared to just 75 of 606 (12%) for Barrera, who landed 65 of 273 (24%) of his power punches. Barrera, who has a solid jab, was also completely out-jabbed, landing just 10 of 333 (3%), compared to 97 of 400 (24%) for Bivol. The fight averaged 512,000 viewers, peaking at 570,000 viewers, on HBO.

==== Bivol vs. Chilemba ====
On 6 June 2018, Main Events announced that Bivol would make a defence against 31-year-old, longtime contender Isaac Chilemba (25–5–2, 10 KOs) on 4 August at the Etess Arena in Atlantic City, New Jersey. Bivol was happy he had the chance to fight a tough challenger, "I am glad that my next opponent will be a tough and well-known boxer in Chilemba. I will do my best to put on another exciting performance for all my fans." The fight would be a co-feature to Sergey Kovalev defending his WBO title against Eleider Álvarez. The idea of having both Bivol and Kovalev on the same card was part of a plan to have them face off in the fall of 2018 in a unification bout, however both had to come out victorious in their respected bouts.

In front of a sold-out crowd of 5,642, Bivol handed Chilemba his sixth career defeat by defeating him via a twelve-round unanimous decision, retaining his WBA title. The three judges scored the bout 120–108, 120–108, and 116–112 for Bivol. Other media outlets including ESPN also scored it a shutout win for Bivol. Bivol landed the harder and cleaner shots throughout the fight. Chilemba landed some nice punches, but not enough to take the rounds. Chilemba used his size to his advantage. Bivol appeared to hurt his right hand as he hardly used it after the first six rounds. Bivol appeared to have hurt his right hand early on. To many viewers, Bivol's right hand gave him a bit of aching after the early rounds. Chilemba showed a great chin in absorbing Bivol's best punches in the first six rounds. Bivol displayed his defensive skills as he blocked many of Chilemba's punches. The punch Chilemba landed the most was a jab. After the fight, Bivol said, "Chilemba is a good fighter and he had champion spirit tonight. He is a strong fighter. I want to fight more good fighters. I don't know who my next opponent will be." Bivol described Chilemba as an awkward fighter. Chilemba believed he dominated the fight after round 6 and should have won the fight. According to CompuBox, Bivol landed 154 of 447 punches thrown (35%) and Chilemba landed 73 of his 472 thrown (16%). The fight, which took place on HBO, averaged 583,000 viewers and hit a peak of 632,000 viewers.

In the main event, Álvarez knocked out Kovalev to claim the WBO title, putting a dent in Bivol's plan to fight Kovalev in the fall.

==== Bivol vs. Pascal ====
Weeks after defeating Chilemba, Bivol's manager, Vadim Kornilov, revealed Bivol would likely return to the ring in December 2018. With the other light heavyweight titleholders already scheduled to make defences, Kornilov stated, "We're trying to get the biggest name we can to get Dmitry more exposure fighting top guys." In September, there were rumours circulating that Bivol would defend his title against Joe Smith Jr. in December. A month later, TVA Sports and The Montreal Journal reported that former unified champion Jean Pascal (33–5–1, 20 KOs) was in talks to fight Bivol on 24 November 2018. The news came after it was also reported that Smith was reportedly closing in on signing a deal to fight IBF champion Artur Beterbiev in December. Pascal was one of the frontrunners to fight Bivol in August 2018. Only a few hours later, the fight was announced to take place on HBO at the Etess Arena in Atlantic City. Before talks emerged, Pascal was originally scheduled to fight Canadian cruiserweight champion Gary Kopas in Canada on 9 November, however the fight was cancelled in early October after Pascal needed time to attend his father's funeral.

Pascal lost by wide unanimous decision. Bivol's right hook was established early in the fight, repeatedly hitting Pascal and knocking him off balance. Bivol saw this taking a toll on Pascal and became even more aggressive, landing body shots and leaving Pascal attempting to defend and not throw back. The home-crowd tried to cheer on Pascal. He had a good fourth round, but Bivol quickly reasserted his dominance. The judges scored the bout 119–109, 119–109, 117–111 in favor of Bivol. This was HBO's final event of the "World Championship Boxing" series, as they announced their exit from boxing. A crowd of 3,853 attended the event. CompuBox showed just how diminant Bivol was in landing 217 of 678 punches thrown (32%), and Pascal landed only 60 of 357 his thrown (17%). When asked who he would like to fight next, Bivol replied, "Doesn't matter to me. I'll fight anybody. I am ready to fight against Alvarez or Kovalev or Badou Jack. I'm ready. Let's make the fight." Pascal rated Bivol as the best in the division. According to Bivol, Pascal's power carried throughout the 12 rounds. Bivol was aware of this after the two sparred in 2016. The fight peaked 537,000 viewers and averaged 467,000 for HBO's final boxing telecast.

==== Bivol vs. Joe Smith Jr. ====
In January 2019, Bivol signed a multi-fight contract with streaming service DAZN. His first fight on the platform was announced to take place against Joe Smith Jr. (24–2, 20 KOs) on 9 March at the Mohegan Sun Arena in Uncasville, Connecticut. A big challenge Bivol faced in signing a deal with DAZN was all the other belt-holders at the time were signed to Top Rank, who were affiliated with ESPN, a rival network. A unification fight would seem distant. On 15 January, it was reported that Bivol signed a promotional contract with Matchroom Boxing USA, who were already contracted with DAZN, however the deal meant Bivol would also get a TV deal with Sky Sports in the UK. World of Boxing's Andrei Ryabinskiy spoke on the deal, “Very happy to be working with Eddie Hearn, it's a pleasure! We look forward to a great event together with Matchroom and DAZN.” All parties were excited about the deal and the fights they would be working together. By the end of January, Turning Stone Resort Casino in Verona was confirmed as the venue as tickets went on sale.

Talking about the fight, Bivol said, “I saw in his eyes when I met him, he wanted my belt. And I’m glad, because only that way it can make a good fight. We are both of different styles. When two guys meet in the ring with different styles in boxing, it usually makes a good fight. I think it will be a good fight for boxing fans." Bivol explained when approaching a fight, he does not think about his title. Instead he thinks about his opponent, their style in the ring and the ways in which he can break them down. Smith was still looking for his first world title. Smith's game plan going into the fight was to be as active and busy as Bivol.

Bivol was too quick and sharp and dominated Smith over the 12-round distance with scores of 119–109, 119–109 and 118–110. Bivol even came close to stopping Smith in the final round. Despite the pre-fight plan to match Bivol's work rate, Smith found it difficult landing meaningful shots, due to the impressive footwork and movement from Bivol. The pro-Smith crowd chanted in the later rounds to try and lift his spirits. It wasn't all straight forward for Bivol. He was buzzed in round 4 following a right hand to the head. He quickly found his rhythm again soon after. Smith threw Bivol to the mat in round 9 after being tangled. Referee Gary Rosato rightfully gave him a warning for this. Smith did not stay for the post-fight in-ring interviews as he made his to the local hospital, which was only precautionary.

Bivol explained his goal was not to get the stoppage, “At the end of fight, I felt that I could knock him out. But that’s not my goal. It was a drama fight. It was a good defense, intelligent boxing. This is a smart sport and you have to think a lot.” One of Bivol's options following the win was a possible move down to super middleweight to challenge WBC & Ring Magazine champion Callum Smith (25–0, 18 KOs), who had just won the World Boxing Super Series tournament in 2018. According to CompuBox stats, Bivol out-threw Smith Jr. 714 to 395, while Bivol outlanded him by a lopsided margin of 208 to 39, for a 29% to 10% edge in accuracy.

=== WBA (Super) light heavyweight champion ===
==== Bivol vs. Castillo ====
On 16 September, Matchroom announced Bivol's sixth defence would come against 31 year old Dominican boxer Lenin Castillo (20–2–1, 15 KOs) on 12 October at Wintrust Arena in Chicago. The fight was co-feature to Oleksandr Usyk's heavyweight debut. Castillo was on a two-fight win streak since his decision loss to Marcus Browne in August 2018. Castillo felt he had the skill to cause an upset against Bivol, who he considered a top 20 P4P boxer. Two days before the fight, Bivol was elevated to the status of full WBA (Super) light heavyweight champion. Bivol weighed 174.3 pounds and Castillo came in at 175 pound limit.

There was a crowd of 9,073 who attended the event. These were mostly Ukraine strong, in support of Usyk, who headlined the card. Bivol dropped Castillo in the sixth round with a counter right hand en route to a convincing unanimous decision victory, with scores of 119–108, 119–108, and 120–107, in what some described as a slow pace fight. Throughout the fight, Bivol kept control with his strong jab and strong counter right hands. Boos were heard from the crowd as the fight ended, suggesting the crowd were not happy with the lack of action or urgency. Bivol was asked why he fights conservatively, to which he replied, “Of course, I want to give a good fight for boxing fans, but if I listen to fans, I can lose. I have to listen to my coach, who told me, ‘You have to be patient. Don’t lose your concentration, and you have to box like you can. You have to keep your belt to get a bigger chance for a big fight for who really wants to give a good fight against you." According to CompuBox, Bivol landed 188 of 652 total punches, connecting at a 29% rate, compared to Castillo, who was 98 of 429 (23%). Bivol was waiting patiently for results in the next month. He wanted to fight the winner of the unification battle between Artur Beterbiev and Oleksandr Gvozdyk or Saul Álvarez vs. Sergey Kovalev, who were set to fight for the latter's WBO title.

==== Bivol vs. Richards ====
On 19 February 2021, it was revealed that Bivol would make the second defense of his WBA (Super) title against the #8 ranked WBA light heavyweight contender Craig Richards (14–1–1 9 KOs), scheduled for the undercard of the Dereck Chisora and Joseph Parker heavyweight clash, which took place on 1 May at the Manchester Arena. Bivol came into his first title defense as a significant -3300 favorite, while most odds-makers had Richards as a +1400 underdog. Hearn wanted to give Richards an opportunity to fight for a world title, but he also revealed that he had spoken to Golden Boy Promotions about a possible fight against Gilberto Ramirez. Joe Smith was on the verge of a world title fight. Hearn speculated Top Rank would end up making a unification fight between him and Artur Beterbiev. Expecting Beterbiev to overcome Smith, everything would then fall in place for a fight between Bivol and Beterbiev. The fight was officially announced a month later. Bivol would have been out of the ring for 18 months by fight night. Only Bivol and a handful of elite boxers did not have a fight scheduled in 2020, due to COVID. Richards was prepared for his first world title fight. He knew what Bivol bought to the table, but felt it was Bivol who had a point to prove and make a statement. Richards was well aware of his underdog status, as he had been in many fights prior. Bivol weighed 174.1 pounds and Richards was 174.4 pounds.

Bivol justified his role as the betting favorite, winning the fight by unanimous decision, with scores of 118–110, 115–113 and 115–114. Bivol appeared to take the first eight rounds, while Richards managed to edge out the last four rounds of the fight. It appeared that Richards was showing Bivol too much respect in the fight up until the championship rounds where he started showing a sense of urgency. By this point, Bivol had a comfortable lead, however not according to two of the judges scorecards. During those rounds, Richards did well do plant his feet and landed big shots. Richards' power began to show in the final round when Bivol started holding to avoid further punishment.

Bivol called out his fellow light heavyweight champions for a title unification bout in the post-fight interview, stating: "It doesn't matter who wants to fight me, I'm open for everyone from the light heavyweight division".

==== Bivol vs. Salamov ====
On 22 November 2021, it was announced that Bivol would make his third WBA (Super) title defense against Umar Salamov (26–1, 19 KOs) on 11 December at the KRK Uralets in Ekaterinburg, Russia. The title bout was scheduled as the main event of a DAZN broadcast card. Salamov was initially expected to face the WBO titleholder Joe Smith Jr. in October 2021, before the fight was cancelled as Smith Jr. withdrew after contracting COVID-19. Bivol entered the fight as a -2000 favorite to win, while most odds-makers had Salamov as a +1100 underdog. Despite the odds, Bivol expected a tough fight and boxing media also anticipated the fight would be more of a challenge for Bivol than his previous two defences. Bivol said, “I know my opponent, I've seen some of his fights. This is a tall guy, a serious and fairly technical boxer." Bivol's training camp was in Krasnodar. He had three sparring partners in camp. Those who could mimic Salamov's fighting style.

Bivol retained the title by a dominant unanimous decision as Salamov proved to be over-matched. Bivol started quick, building a strong lead then coasted to a lop-sided decision. Two judges scoring the fight 118–110 in his favor, while the third judge awarded him a 119–109 scorecard. Salamov didn't possess the skill or power to win rounds. He kept coming forward only to be tagged by jabs all fight. It was in the ninth round when Bivol slowed down the pace. One positive take away from Salamov's performance was his high guard where he managed to block a lot of jabs. Any time Salamov was able to land a big shot, Bivol overwhelmed him with counter shots and combinations.

==== Bivol vs. Álvarez ====
It was announced on 25 February 2022 that Bivol would be making the fourth defense of his WBA (Super) title against 4-division world champion Canelo Álvarez on 7 May in a bout that would be televised as sports streaming service DAZN's first pay-per-view offering in the United States and Canada. The fight was able to take place because while in response to the 2022 Russian invasion of Ukraine three of boxing's world governing bodies had blocked championship fights involving Russian and Belarusian boxers, the World Boxing Association (WBA) chose to allow the fight to proceed.

Despite coming into the bout as an underdog, with most odds-makers having him a +400 underdog, Bivol won the fight by unanimous decision (115–113 on all three judges' scorecards) after 12 rounds, in one of boxings recent upsets. Bivol won the final 3 rounds on all three judges scorecards. Interestingly, all three judges scored the first four rounds unanimously for Álvarez. Bivol fought behind the jab in the opening round whilst Álvarez attacked his body. Álvarez gained Bivol's attention when he landed a clean right uppercut on his chin to close the fourth round. Bivol used his excellent foot movements and took control of the fight during the middle rounds. Bivol was warned by referee Russell Mora in the seventh round for pushing Álvarez down. He was not deducted any points. Álvarez began to tire from round 8 as Bivol continued to outwork him.

Bivol's arms were bruised due to Álvarez's tactics, the same tactic he had used in his win over Callum Smith where he targeted his arms. Bivol said, "He beat my arm up but not my head. He kept hitting me in the arms, and I kept hitting him in the face ... I expect that. I watched the fight against Callum Smith." Bivol claimed he was the best in the division and apologised to his promoter Eddie Hearn, who had recently had the Álvarez-Golovkin trilogy fight signed for September 2022. Speaking after the fight, Álvarez planned to activate the rematch clause in the contract. He said, "It doesn't end like this. No excuses, I lost today; he is a great boxer ... I felt his power. He comes in and he goes out. He manages his distance really well." This was also Álvarez's first professional loss since 2013 and was on a 16-fight unbeaten streak. He felt Bivol only won 5 rounds.

According to CompuBox punch statistics, Bivol had outlanded Álvarez in every round of the fight, for a total of 152 punches landed out of 710 thrown (21%), compared to Álvarez's 84 of 495 (17%). Many media reporters and pundits drew attention to the judges' official scorecards: all three judges had scored Álvarez the winner of the first four rounds, something that was roundly criticized, and described by ESPN reporter Mike Coppinger as "puzzling". Despite the widespread public opinion that Bivol was the deserved winner, Álvarez disagreed with this notion, stating in his post-fight interview: "I don't feel like I lost the fight... Personally, I felt he [Bivol] only won four or five rounds." He went on to express his desire to fight Bivol again: "We want the rematch, and we're going to do better in the rematch."

According to Dan Rafael, the PPV did 520,000 buys worldwide generating between $35 million to $40 million in revenue. The PPV numbers were much lower than the 1 million they had forecasted. According to reports, Álvarez was to take home a $15 million base up, rising up to $53 million. Bivol was guaranteed $2 million base up to $5 million, depending on PPV revenue, his highest career purse.

Despite this, a rematch between Álvarez and Bivol did not materialize immediately, as the former opted to face WBA (Super) and IBF middleweight champion Gennady Golovkin in a trilogy bout as his opponent for his next fight instead.

==== Bivol vs. Ramírez ====
On 11 July 2022, the WBA ordered Bivol to make a mandatory title defence against the former WBO super middleweight champion and current top contender Gilberto Ramírez (44–0, 30 KOs). Ramírez became mandatory after stopping in May 2022 in a final eliminator. Dominic Boesel The teams had until 11 August to complete a deal before purse bids would be ordered. His promoters, Matchroom Boxing, asked for an exemption to bypass a mandatory title defence against Ramírez and instead face Joshua Buatsi. The request was rejected by the WBA on 10 August. A purse bid was called for 21 August as the pair failed to come to terms, with a minimum bid of $400,000, with a 75% split in favor of Bivol. The two camps came to an agreement on 21 August. Bivol and Ramírez would face each other on 5 November in the United Arab Emirates.

On 30 August the fight was officially announce via a press release with the debut of 'Champion Series' in Abu Dhabi, with the fight taking place at the Etihad Arena. Ramírez was on a 5-fight win streak at light heavyweight. On the fight finally being announced, Bivol said, “The fight with Zurdo has been brewing for some time, many things have been said. Now we have the chance to take care of things with our actions in the ring, and not our words outside of the ring.” Ramírez was confident heading into the fight. Due to the fight being a mandatory, there was no rematch clause in the contract, however Golden Boy Promotions' matchmaker Robert Diaz declared if the fight was one the public wanted to see again, they would work on a rematch. Ramírez made it known how he pushed for the fight. He argued that Bivol's team never wanted to make the fight, hence asking the WBA for an exemption, in order to fight Buatsi. Both boxers were present at the kick-off press conference and showed mutual respect towards each other. Afterwards, Ramírez spoke to reporters telling them he planned to outwork and outland Bivol in order to become world champion. During an interview with FightHype.com, Ramírez was asked if Bivol was the best boxer he would fight. He replied, “Not really. I been in the ring with so many good fighters. I think this is really important for me because it’s a title fight but I been with really good fighters too.” Despite his response, it would be the first time he entered a fight as heavy underdog. His aim was to exact revenge for Mexico after Bivol defeated Álvarez. Both weighed below the limit with Bivol at 174.7 pounds and Ramírez weighing 174.6 pounds.

Bivol made a tenth successful defence of his WBA title, defeating Ramírez by unanimous decision. Bivol started slow losing a couple of the opening four rounds. Bivol dominated with his speed and combinations as Ramírez was out of his depth in the second half of the contest. From the fifth round, Bivol took over and regularly backed up Ramírez unloading sharp combinations to the head. Bivol was able to catch anything Ramírez threw his way with his gloves and arms. Bivol fought on the inside during the championship rounds, showing he was indeed far superior than his opponent. The judges scores were 117–111, 117–111 and 118–110. Bivol outlanded Ramírez 131 to 107 in overall punches and 64 to 38 in jabs, negating his opponent's narrow 69 to 67 lead in power connects. Bivol explained his change in strategy for the fight compared to his previous fight. Many believed Bivol would fight on the backfoot with Ramírez trying to get close to him, however it was Bivol who was coming forward. The reason he did this was to force Ramírez into action, tiring him quicker.

During the post-fight interview, Bivol stated his desire to face the unified light heavyweight champion Artur Beterbiev in a title unification bout. He was later named the 2022 The Ring "Fighter of the Year".

=== WBA and IBO ===
==== Bivol vs. Arthur ====
On 2 May 2023, the WBC president Mauricio Sulaiman revealed to ESPN that the sanctioning body had declared Bivol ineligible to face the unified light heavyweight champion Artur Beterbiev due to the ongoing sanctions for Russian and Belarusian fighters following the Russian invasion of Ukraine. Despite rumours that he would rematch Canelo Álvarez, Bivol's manager Vadim Kornilov instead revealed on 26 September that his fighter was in talks with Anthony Yarde, Lyndon Arthur, Radivoje Kalajdzic and Jaime Munguía for a planned December bout. Having not had a fight scheduled in 2023, on 2 November Hearn told reporters that he would like to get Bivol back in the ring in January 2024 in preparation to fighting Beterbiev. The two boxes teased a fight with face off during the Tyson Fury-Francis Ngannou fight week. Kornilov stated a fight with Munguia was discussed but failed to materialise. There was also continued discussions for his opponent to be Ahmed Elbiali and Arthur. Reports circulated that David Morrell, the WBA (regular) titlist had rejected an opportunity to fight Bivol. Warriors Boxing executive Luis DeCubas Sr. said they reached out for the fight, but never received a response.

On 14 November 2023, it was announced that Bivol would defend his WBA title against IBO light heavyweight champion Lyndon Arthur (23–1, 16 KOs). The championship bout was scheduled to take place on a blockbuster car on 23 December at the Kingdom Arena in Riyadh, Saudi Arabia, under the Riyadh Season banner, headed by Turki Alalshikh. Bivol underwent surgery on his right hand in April 2024 to resolve a deep-rooting pain. He was now more confident in his right hand and able to train more effectively during his light training camp earlier in the year. Arthur wanted to dedicate the fight and a win for his late brother Zennen Blackburn, who was murdered in 2002, when Arthur was only 10 years old. He was a huge +1100 underdog heading into the fight. Bivol on the other hand was a -2500 favorite. Bivol weighed in 174.6 pounds and Arthur was a little lighter at 174.2 pounds.

Bivol won the fight by a dominant unanimous decision, with all three judges scoring the contest 120–107 in his favor. He knocked Arthur down once, as he forced him to take a knee with a left hook to the body in round 11. Bivol did not take much risk and put on a workman-like performance. In the last round, Bivol looked to go for the stoppage throwing a flurry of punches. He was stopped in his tracks after Arthur caught him with a big shot. Bivol admitted he wanted to go for a stoppage, but did not feel fully confident in his hand after the recent hand surgery.

==== Bivol vs. Zinad ====
Bivol was expected to face the unified WBC, WBO and IBF light heavyweight champion Artur Beterbiev (20–0, 20 KOs) for the undisputed title on 1 June 2024. WBC president Mauricio Sulaiman had confirmed that the WBC belt would be on the line despite his organization's previous stance against Bivol challenging for the title. Beterbiev withdrew from the fight on 3 May, after suffering a ruptured meniscus in training. Fringe contender Malik Zinad (22–0, 16 KOs) was selected to fill in for Beterbiev. He was coming off a majority decision win in April against Jerome Pampellone in Sydney. Bivol praised and thanked Zinad for stepping in at short notice, considering he only fought a month prior. Zinad could not turn down the title opportunity as he dreamt of this moment since he was 10 years old. Bivol came in at the 175 limit and Zinad weighed 174.2 pounds.

Bivol beat Zinad by TKO in the sixth round. His first stoppage win since March 2018, ending a run of nine consecutive unanimous decision wins. Zinad started fast in the first round, throwing hard rights and hard jabs. However, he showed too much ambition and was knocked down by a left hand. Bivol controlled the fight in round 2 with his jab as Zinad fought with caution. A straight right bloodied Zinad's nose. The end came in the sixth when Bivol sent Zinad into the ropes following a barrage of heavy shots. The referee then stopped the fight at 2:06 of the round. According to Compubox, Bivol landed 93 of his 221 punches thrown (42.1%) while Zinad landed 42 of his 352 thrown (11.9). Soon after the fight, Turki Alalshikh announced the Beterbiev-Bivol undisputed fight would take place on 12 October 2024.

=== Undisputed light heavyweight championship ===
==== Bivol vs. Beterbiev ====
Following Bivol's routine title defence on 1 June against Zinad, Turki Alalshikh announced the undisputed fight would take place on 12 October at the Kingdom Arena in Riyadh. Alalshikh told Bivol, "You are one of the best fighters ever and you deserve this. We offer for you four or five fights -- big fights. We want to see you against [David] Benavidez, we want to see you against [Jai] Opetaia, against the tough [opponents]." Top Rank's Bob Arum described the fight as 'a battle between legends'. The card was available on PPV platforms worldwide, via DAZN, however a deal was agreed for the main event to also be broadcast in the USA on ESPN+. Arum was overjoyed with this decision as it meant there was another available platform the US fans could access the fight. Bivol praised Beterbiev ahead of the fight. He said, “He’s a great fighter. He’s a great puncher. Also, he has a good technique. I watch his fights, of course. Not too much but I watched his last fights." He said the fight was never personal. Only his final stop to his career goal. Thomas Taylor was confirmed as the referee for the fight. Taylor had never previously officiated a fight involving Beterbiev or Bivol. Despite stopping all his previous opponents, Beterbiev stated he always prepares for 12 rounds and this fight was no different. Bivol weighed 174.12 pounds and Beterbiev came in just under the limit at 174.9 pounds.

Bivol and Beterbiev went head to head for the undisputed championship, and the fight would go all 12 rounds making Bivol the first fighter to go the distance with Beterbiev. Bivol lost to Beterbiev by majority decision, losing his titles when one judge scored it 114–114, whereas the other two judges gave the fight to Beterbiev with scores of 115–113 and 116–112, and Beterbiev became the first undisputed light heavyweight Champion in 22 years. The fight was described as a tactical chess match. Bivol began the fight behind a strong jab. Beterbiev struggled with Bivol's hand speed earlier on, but was able to get through his guard many times. Where Bivol was landing combinations, Beterbiev was coming forward and landing one punch at a time. The tide changed slightly in fifth round which saw Beterbiev getting the better of Bivol, landing his own combinations and in the next round he connected with body shot. Bivol stood toe-to-toe with Beterbiev in round 7, at one point landing five unanswered punches. Beterbiev began switching stances depending on Bivol's movements. Bivol's eye began to swell in round 8 and he spent most of round 9 moving around avoiding Beterbiev's power. The boxers began to clinch in round 10. This was one of the first times either clinched in the fight, otherwise, the referee barely got involved. Referee Taylor was then forced into action again in round 11, warning Bivol for pushing Beterbiev's head down. Beterbiev finished the fight stronger of the two. After the fight, Bivol's team stated that they wanted an immediate rematch, and Beterbiev's team stated that they were happy to do it.

The decision was received with mixed emotions from the crowd. Many believed Bivol did enough to win, but understood it was a razor-close fight. Speaking on the win, Beterbiev said, "Of course it's a tough fight because Dmitri is a champion, too. He has good skills, maybe better than me. But today, Allah chose me." Bivol felt he could have done more and promised to do more in the rematch. He said, "I did my job. I felt that I could do better. ... He is powerful, very powerful. And you see I have a bruise from my hand. He always beat it and it was so hard, even he reached my eye." Beterbiev's punch power broke through Bivol's defence on many occasions, which explained the bruising on his hand and the swelling on his eye. According to Compubox stats, Beterbiev landed 137 of 682 punches thrown (20%) and Bivol landed 142 of his 423 thrown (33.6%). Both landed 31 body shots each. Beterbiev had the edge in power shots out-landing Bivol 90 to 64 punches landed. Of the 12 rounds, ten of them were scored identical. It was reported that they both took home a $10 million purse for the fight.

Amongst those that were unhappy with the decision was Bivol's promoter Eddie Hearn. He, along with others, branded the 116–112 scorecard too wide and said the judge "should never work in the sport again," referring to Polish judge Pawel Kardyni. Calls for a rematch were made and was already looking likely a rematch would take place due to how close the fight was. A week later, Bivol and his team filed a protest with all four sanctioning bodies. His team knew the decision would not be overturned, but rather it was done to help force an immediate rematch. Bivol discussed the changes he would making during an interview. He said, “I want to improve more with my movements. I didn’t move enough. I felt I had to move more. More counterpunches. I just need to add more. I felt some moments where I could do it, but I was a little bit careful.” Bivol did not make any excuses for the loss.

On 17 October, the IBF ordered Beterbiev to make a mandatory defence against Michael Eifert (13–1, 5 KOs). Angry fans took to social media to voice their disappointment of the news as it would jeopardise a rematch between Bivol and Beterbiev to have all four titles on the line. Bob Arum was also frustrated with the mandatory order. He told a reporter, “It’s totally insane. It’s like a burden to be undisputed. I mean, the idea that you have to fight some non-entity to keep your title after you’ve won the biggest fight of your career seems crazy to me. This is ludicrous. They say, ‘These are our rules.’ Well, change the rules.” Arum only wanted Beterbiev to have big fights. Arum spoke to Dan Rafael on 21 October about the possible rematch. He explained because Riyadh Season ends in February, it meant the rematch could take place in October 2025. This could see both boxers having a fight in the interim.

==== Bivol vs. Beterbiev II ====
On 26 November 2024, news broke out about a huge card being planned for Riyadh in February 2025, to close off Riyadh Season. Many sources reported the rematch between Beterbiev (21–0, 20 KOs) and Bivol would headline the event. On 2 December, the rematch was made official for 22 February for the undisputed light heavyweight title. This was considered a quick turnaround and would leave a gap of only four months between the two fights. Bivol wanted the rematch, as did his team. When asked by Alalshikh about the date, Bivol accepted immediately. Bivol wanted to remove doubt in the rematch and to win more convincingly to ensure he got his hand raised at the end. Beterbiev explained his main goal was to win all the belts, and now his goal was to defend them all. Beterbiev went through an injury-free training camp. Bivol re-iterated what he said after the first fight, that he would increase his endurance and throw more punches, staying busy throughout the fight. Beterbiev said they both know each other in the ring, but assumed Bivol would have a different game plan heading into the rematch. The IBF granted an exemption for the fight to take place. The IBF was next in regards to the mandatory rotation according to the WBA and WBO, however WBC President Mauricio Sulaiman stated David Benavidez was next in line. There was many options available for the winner of the fight. Beterbiev weighed 175 pounds and Bivol weighed 174.1 pounds.

The event took place in a smaller venue, the ANB Arena in Riyadh, in front of 7,000 fans. In another tactical chess fight, this time it was Bivol, who put on a skilful performance and gained revenge on Beterbiev via majority decision. One judge scored bout 114–114, with the other two judges overriding the score with 116–112 and 115–113 for Bivol to crown him the undisputed champion, He also won the Ring Magazine belt and handed Beterbiev his first career loss. Bivol was more relaxed and showed more patience in the rematch. Bivol used combinations, superior hand speed and movement to win. Beterbiev wasn't able to cut off the ring well enough this time but had his moments, landing hard shots when in range. Bivol established his jab earlier on to counter Beterbiev. From the third round Beterbiev looked to take over. Bivol's output reduced and Beterbiev was able to out-land him. This changed after the seventh round. Beterbiev's pace slowed down and Bivol began to use his movement and circle around, landing crisp combinations. In the tenth, Beterbiev did the better work, until Bivol landed some combinations to end the round strong. Before the final round, Beterbiev's corner told him he needed to win the round for any chance to win the fight. He stalked Bivol managed to open up a cut on Bivol's left eyebrow. Interestingly, the three scorecards were identical to the scores in the first fight.

After the fight Bivol said, "I'm just so happy. I went through a lot the last year and this is so exciting. I was better, I was pushing myself more. I was more confident, I was lighter. I just wanted to win so much today." Beterbiev responded to the outcome stating "I don't want to talk about the decision, I just want to say congrats to Bivol. I think this fight was better than the first fight but now it's my time to come back", leading to speculation there will be a trilogy fight. Compubox showed a significant change in output for Bivol compared to the first bout. He was credited in landing 170 of 574 punches thrown (31.1%), while Beterbiev landed 121 of his 688 thrown (17.6%). Bivol landed more than Beterbiev in 9 of the 12 rounds.

Talks emerged for a trilogy. Both Bivol and Beterbiev were also open to the idea. The gap between the fights was not expected to be as short this time. Former HBO Boxing commentator Jim Lampley was also high on praise for the bout. He said, “People ask me, ‘Does it rise to the level of Gatti-Ward and Barrera-Morales in terms of the intensity of the combat? I say yes.” On a possible trilogy, Lampley was open to the idea, but said it didn't need to happen next. Some media outlets also stated it wouldn't be a bad idea if Bivol defended his titles against a top contender next. Hearn went on record to say the rematch was the best fight he had seen live. He also felt, Bivol would win the trilogy more convincingly, if it happened.

=== Unified light heavyweight champion ===
On 6 March, the WBC formally ordered Bivol to make a mandatory defence against interim champion David Benavidez (30–0, 24 KOs). Both teams had until 8 April to negotiate a deal. Turki Alalshikh stated he was “no longer interested” in the bout and intended to put on a trilogy between Bivol and Beterbiev. This suggested that Riyadh Season would not be involved in the negotiations. There was rumours a deal was close to being agreed until Sampson Lewkowicz squashed them. He stated he had sent a large offer to Bivol's team and was yet to hear back. On 7 April, Bivol informed the WBC of his decision to relinquish the title, in order to move forward with a trilogy bout with Beterbiev. With this, Benavidez was upgraded to full titleholder. In Bivol's teams' letter to the WBC, it was said that the IBF was supposed to be next in line in terms of the mandatory rotation system set up by the organisations.

==== Bivol vs. Eifert ====
In July 2025, it was reported that both Bivol and Beterbiev asked Turki Alalshikh if the trilogy could be held in Russia with different organizers, to which he gave his blessing. Sources indicated that the boxers had been presented with a lucrative proposal from an event organizer. Beterbiev later posted his frustrations on Instagram about the delay in the trilogy fight. On 2 July, the IBF ordered Bivol to make a mandatory defence against German boxer Michael Eifert (13–1, 5 KOs) next. This was the second time in less than a year the IBF had ordered their mandatory. Beterbiev placed the responsibility on Bivol for the absence of a trilogy. He said, “We were offered great conditions, which were almost impossible to refuse. For my part, I did everything to make the third fight happen, but my opponent chose the path of retreat again. I’ve waited long enough and I don’t intend to wait any longer." Beterbiev announced he would fight Deon Nicholson on 22 November, although the fight was called off. On 9 August, Bivol announced to his fans via social media that he had undergone successful back surgery, following his doctor's recommendation, for an injury he had been managing for the past ten years. Subsequently, he applied for a medical exemption due to his current condition, as the negotiation period set by the IBF had elapsed. Bivol's team submitted a certification of injury as requested by the WBO. On 30 December, his manager Vadim Kornilov announced that Bivol was looking to fight in Spring of 2026, followed by a bigger fight later in the year. One of the options for his next fight was mandatory challenger Michael Eifert.

After several extensions for purse bid negotiations were granted over five weeks, with involvement from Matchroom Boxing and SES Promotions, a deal was reached in March 2026, with the fight likely to take place on 23 May, as part of the undercard for the Oleksandr Usyk-Rico Verhoeven heavyweight championship bout in Egypt. On 30 March, it was reported that Bivol would defend his titles against Eifert at the UGMK Arena in Ekaterinburg, Russia, on 30 May, and promoted by RCC Promotions. WBO president Gustavo Olivieri announced that the world title would not be at stake for the fight, as it was scheduled to take place in Russia, which was connected to the ongoing conflict with Ukraine. Although Bivol would not lose his title, the organization classified the fight as a non-title bout. At the same time, Eifert was not ranked in WBO's top 15. Both fighters made weight, with Bivol at 174.4 pounds and Eifert at 174.3 pounds. Bivol dominated Eifert to win by unanimous decision with all judges scoring 120–107, controlling the fight from start to finish and remaining undefeated. In the first round, Bivol connected with a left hook, which dropped Eifert. He quickly rose, but spent much of the round on the back foot. For the remainder of the fight, Bivol maintained control of the fight using is jab, footwork and counter punches. Bivol hurt Eifert again in the eleventh round with a left hook to the body. He recovered well after Bivol opted not to pursue a stoppage. Eifert recorded the lowest CompuBox numbers in its 41-year history, for a 12-round fight. He managed to land 12 of 349 punches (3%). There were six rounds where he did not land a single punch.

==== Bivol vs. Callum Smith ====
Bivol was set to undergo surgery on 4 July 2026 to repair an injured left elbow. After completing his recovery, he was expected to defend his titles against mandatory challenger Callum Smith (31–2, 22 KOs), with the WBO set to formally order the bout. Smith had secured his mandatory position by defeating Joshua Buatsi via unanimous decision in February 2025. One option for Bivol was to vacate the WBO title, which would elevate Smith to full championship status. Bivol was considering this in order to pursue a trilogy bout with Artur Beterbiev or a potential fight with David Benavidez. On 7 July, the WBO officially ordered the bout against Smith, giving both teams 20 days to agree terms. On 27 August, Olivieri confirmed that the parties had reached an agreement, with the fight reportedly scheduled for December 2026 in Russia. On 12 October, it was announced that Bivol would defend his unified IBF, WBO, WBA and Ring light heavyweight titles against Smith on 12 December in Yekaterinburg, Russia. Ahead of the bout, Bivol identified Benavidez, Álvarez and Beterbiev as prospective future opponents. Both fighters were returning from extended periods of inactivity caused in part by injuries.

== Professional boxing record ==
26 fights	25 wins	1 loss
By knockout	12	0
By decision	13	1

No.	Result	Record	Opponent	Type	Round, time	Date	Location	Notes
26	Win	25–1	Michael Eifert	UD	12	30 May 2026	UMMC Arena, Yekaterinburg, Russia	Retained WBA (Super), IBF, and The Ring light-heavyweight titles
25	Win	24–1	Artur Beterbiev	MD	12	22 Feb 2025	The Venue Riyadh Season, Riyadh, Saudi Arabia	Won WBA (Super), WBC, IBF, WBO, IBO, and The Ring light-heavyweight titles
24	Loss	23–1	Artur Beterbiev	MD	12	12 Oct 2024	Kingdom Arena, Riyadh, Saudi Arabia	Lost WBA (Super) and IBO light-heavyweight titles; For WBC, IBF, WBO, and vacant The Ring light-heavyweight titles
23	Win	23–0	Malik Zinad	TKO	6 (12), 2:06	1 Jun 2024	Kingdom Arena, Riyadh, Saudi Arabia	Retained WBA (Super) and IBO light-heavyweight titles
22	Win	22–0	Lyndon Arthur	UD	12	23 Dec 2023	Kingdom Arena, Riyadh, Saudi Arabia	Retained WBA (Super) light-heavyweight title; Won IBO light-heavyweight title
21	Win	21–0	Gilberto Ramírez	UD	12	5 Nov 2022	Etihad Arena, Abu Dhabi, United Arab Emirates	Retained WBA (Super) light-heavyweight title
20	Win	20–0	Canelo Álvarez	UD	12	7 May 2022	T-Mobile Arena, Paradise, Nevada, U.S.	Retained WBA (Super) light-heavyweight title
19	Win	19–0	Umar Salamov	UD	12	11 Dec 2021	KRK Uralets, Ekaterinburg, Russia	Retained WBA (Super) light-heavyweight title
18	Win	18–0	Craig Richards	UD	12	1 May 2021	AO Arena, Manchester, England	Retained WBA (Super) light-heavyweight title
17	Win	17–0	Lenin Castillo	UD	12	12 Oct 2019	Wintrust Arena, Chicago, Illinois, U.S.	Retained WBA (Super) light-heavyweight title
16	Win	16–0	Joe Smith Jr.	UD	12	9 Mar 2019	Turning Stone Resort Casino, Verona, New York, U.S.	Retained WBA light-heavyweight title
15	Win	15–0	Jean Pascal	UD	12	24 Nov 2018	Etess Arena, Atlantic City, New Jersey, U.S.	Retained WBA light-heavyweight title
14	Win	14–0	Isaac Chilemba	UD	12	4 Aug 2018	Etess Arena, Atlantic City, New Jersey, U.S.	Retained WBA light-heavyweight title
13	Win	13–0	Sullivan Barrera	TKO	12 (12), 1:41	3 Mar 2018	The Theater at Madison Square Garden, New York City, New York, U.S.	Retained WBA light-heavyweight title
12	Win	12–0	Trent Broadhurst	KO	1 (12), 3:00	4 Nov 2017	Casino de Salle Medecin, Monte Carlo, Monaco	Retained WBA light-heavyweight title
11	Win	11–0	Cedric Agnew	TKO	4 (10), 1:27	17 Jun 2017	Mandalay Bay Events Center, Paradise, Nevada, U.S.	
10	Win	10–0	Samuel Clarkson	TKO	4 (12), 1:40	14 Apr 2017	MGM National Harbor, Oxon Hill, Maryland, U.S.	Retained WBA interim light-heavyweight title
9	Win	9–0	Robert Berridge	TKO	4 (12), 0:47	23 Feb 2017	Nizhny Tagil Forum, Nizhny Tagil, Russia	Retained WBA interim light-heavyweight title
8	Win	8–0	Yevgeni Makhteienko	UD	10	29 Oct 2016	Ekaterinburg Arena, Ekaterinburg, Russia	
7	Win	7–0	Felix Valera	UD	12	21 May 2016	Khodynka Ice Palace, Moscow, Russia	Won WBA interim light-heavyweight title
6	Win	6–0	Cleiton Conceição	KO	4 (10), 2:24	18 Feb 2016	The Hangar, Costa Mesa, California, U.S.	
5	Win	5–0	Jackson Junior	TKO	4 (10), 1:59	4 Nov 2015	TatNeft Arena, Kazan, Russia	Won vacant WBA Inter-Continental light-heavyweight title
4	Win	4–0	Felipe Romero	KO	8 (8), 2:38	27 Aug 2015	The Hangar, Costa Mesa, California, U.S.	Won vacant WBC–USNBC Silver light-heavyweight title
3	Win	3–0	Joey Vegas	KO	4 (8), 1:10	22 May 2015	Luzhniki Palace of Sports, Moscow, Russia	
2	Win	2–0	Konstantin Piternov	TKO	3 (6), 1:12	10 Apr 2015	Luzhniki Palace of Sports, Moscow, Russia	
1	Win	1–0	Jorge Rodriguez Olivera	TKO	6 (6), 1:44	28 Nov 2014	Luzhniki Palace of Sports, Moscow, Russia	

== Pay-per-view bouts ==
Date	Fight	Billing	Buys	Network	Revenue
7 May 2022	Canelo vs. Bivol	Legacy is Earned	520,000	DAZN	$36,400,000
22 February 2025	Beterbiev vs. Bivol 2	The Last Crescendo	340,000	DAZN	$7,818,300

== Titles in boxing ==
=== Major world titles ===
- WBA (Super) light-heavyweight champion (175 lbs) (2×)
- WBC light-heavyweight champion (175 lbs)
- IBF light-heavyweight champion (175 lbs)
- WBO light-heavyweight champion (175 lbs)

=== The Ring magazine titles ===
- The Ring light-heavyweight champion (175 lbs)

=== Interim world titles ===
- WBA interim light-heavyweight champion (175 lbs)

=== Minor world titles ===
- IBO light-heavyweight champion (175 lbs) (2×)

=== Regional/International titles ===
- WBA Inter-Continental light-heavyweight champion (175 lbs)
- USNBC Silver light-heavyweight champion (175 lbs)

=== Undisputed titles ===
- Undisputed light-heavyweight champion

=== Honorary titles ===
- WBC Undisputed II champion
- Riyadh Season Undisputed light-heavyweight champion

== Boxing awards ==
- Sugar Ray Robinson Award: 2022
- The Ring magazine Fighter of the Year: 2022
- Sports Illustrated Fighter of the Year: 2022
- Sports Illustrated Fight of the Year vs. Artur Beterbiev II (2025)
- The Sporting News Men's Boxer of the Year: 2022
- The Sporting News Upset of the Year vs. Canelo Álvarez (2022)
- BoxingScene Fighter of the Year (2022)
- WBN Fight of the Year vs. Artur Beterbiev II (2025)

== See also ==
- List of male boxers
- List of world light-heavyweight boxing champions

== Notes ==
Sporting positions
Regional boxing titles
New title	WBC–USNBC Silver light-heavyweight champion 27 August 2015 – December 2015; Vacated	Vacant
Vacant Title last held by Mirco Ricci	WBA Inter-Continental light-heavyweight champion 4 November 2015 – March 2016; Vacated	Vacant Title next held by Enrico Kölling
Minor world boxing titles
Preceded by Lyndon Arthur	IBO light-heavyweight champion 23 December 2023 – 13 October 2024	Succeeded by Artur Beterbiev
Preceded by Artur Beterbiev	IBO light-heavyweight champion 22 February 2025 – present	Incumbent
Major world boxing titles
Preceded by Felix Valera	WBA light-heavyweight champion Interim title 21 May 2016 – 14 October 2017; Promoted	Vacant Title next held by Marcus Browne
Preceded by Badou Jack; Vacated	WBA light-heavyweight champion 14 October 2017 – 10 October 2019; Promoted	Succeeded by Himself as Super champion
Vacant Title last held by Bernard Hopkins	WBA light-heavyweight champion Super title 10 October 2019 – 13 October 2024	Succeeded by Artur Beterbiev
Preceded by Artur Beterbiev	WBA light-heavyweight champion Super title 22 February 2025 – present	Incumbent
Preceded by Artur Beterbiev	WBC light-heavyweight champion 22 February – 7 April 2025; Vacated	Succeeded by David Benavidez; Promoted
Preceded by Artur Beterbiev	IBF light-heavyweight champion 22 February 2025 – present	Incumbent
Preceded by Artur Beterbiev	WBO light-heavyweight champion 22 February 2025 – present	Incumbent
Preceded by Artur Beterbiev	The Ring light-heavyweight champion 22 February 2025 – present	Incumbent
Preceded by Artur Beterbiev	Undisputed light-heavyweight champion 22 February – 7 April 2025; Titles fragmented	Vacant
