= Artur Beterbiev vs. Dmitry Bivol =

2024 boxing match

IV Crown Showdown
- Date: 12 October 2024
- Venue: Kingdom Arena, Riyadh, Saudi Arabia
- Title(s) on the line: WBA (Super), WBC, IBF, WBO, IBO, TBRB and vacant The Ring undisputed light heavyweight titles

Tale of the tape
Boxer	Artur Beterbiev	Dmitry Bivol
Hometown	Khasavyurt, Russia	Tokmok, Kyrgyzstan
Pre-fight record	20–0 (20 KO)	23–0 (12 KO)
Age	39 years, 8 months	33 years, 9 months
Height	5 ft 11 1/2 in (182 cm)	6 ft 0 in (183 cm)
Weight	174.9 lb (79 kg)	174.1 lb (79 kg)
Style	Orthodox	Orthodox
Recognition	WBC, IBF and WBO; Light Heavyweight Champion; The Ring; No. 1 Ranked Light Heavyweight; The Ring No. 6 ranked pound-for-pound fighter	WBA (Super) and IBO; Light Heavyweight Champion; The Ring; No. 2 Ranked Light HeavyweightThe Ring No. 7 ranked pound-for-pound fighter

Result
- Beterbiev wins by 12-round majority decision (116–112, 115–113, 114–114)

Artur Beterbiev vs. Dmitry Bivol, billed as IV Crown Showdown, was a professional boxing match between unified WBC, IBF, and WBO, Artur Beterbiev and WBA (Super) and IBO light heavyweight champion, Dmitry Bivol, for the undisputed light heavyweight championship. The fight took place on 12 October 2024 at the Kingdom Arena, Riyadh, Saudi Arabia as part of Riyadh Season.

== Background ==
Beterbiev was expected to face Bivol for the undisputed title on 1 June 2024. Beterbiev was forced to withdraw from the fight on 3 May, after suffering a ruptured meniscus in training. Malik Zinad was selected to fill in for Beterbiev against Bivol on 1 June, with Beterbiev and Bivol intending to meet should Bivol beat Zinad.

Following Bivol's routine title defence on 1 June against Zinad, Turki Alalshikh announced the undisputed fight would take place on 12 October at the Kingdom Arena in Riyadh. Alalshikh told Bivol, "You are one of the best fighters ever and you deserve this. We offer for you four or five fights -- big fights. We want to see you against [David] Benavidez, we want to see you against [Jai] Opetaia, against the tough [opponents]." Top Rank's Bob Arum described the fight as 'a battle between legends'. The card was available on PPV platforms worldwide, via DAZN, however a deal was agreed for the main event to also be broadcast in the USA on ESPN+. Arum was overjoyed with this decision as it meant there was another available platform the US fans could access the fight. Bivol praised Beterbiev ahead of the fight. He said, “He’s a great fighter. He’s a great puncher. Also, he has a good technique. I watch his fights, of course. Not too much but I watched his last fights." He said the fight was never personal. Only his final stop to his career goal. Thomas Taylor was confirmed as the referee for the fight. Taylor had never previously officiated a fight involving Beterbiev or Bivol. Despite stopping all his previous opponents, Beterbiev stated he always prepares for 12 rounds and this fight was no different. Bivol weighed 174.12 pounds and Beterbiev came in just under the limit at 174.9 pounds.

Beterbiev was the reigning TBRB champion, with Bivol ranked as the No. 1 contender.

== Fight details ==
Bivol and Beterbiev went head to head for the undisputed championship, and the fight would go all 12 rounds making Bivol the first fighter to go the distance with Beterbiev. Beterbiev beat Bivol by majority decision, winning his titles when one judge scored it 114–114, whereas the other two judges gave the fight to Beterbiev with scores of 115–113 and 116–112, and Beterbiev became the first undisputed light heavyweight Champion in 22 years. The fight was described as a tactical chess match. Bivol began his fight behind a strong jab. Beterbiev struggled with Bivol's hand speed earlier on, but was able to get through his guard many times. Where Bivol was landing combinations, Beterbiev was coming forward and landing one punch at a time. The tide changed slightly in fifth round which saw Beterbiev getting the better of Bivol, landing his own combinations and in the next round he connected with body shot. Bivol stood toe-to-toe with Beterbiev in round 7, at one point landing five unanswered punches. Beterbiev began switching stances depending on Bivol's movements. Bivol's eye began to swell in round 8 and he spent most of round 9 moving around avoiding Beterbiev's power. The boxers began to clinch in round 10. This was one of the first times either clinched in the fight, otherwise, the referee barely got involved. Referee Taylor was then forced into action again in round 11, warning Bivol for pushing Beterbiev's head down. Beterbiev finished the fight stronger of the two. After the fight, Bivol’s team stated that they wanted an immediate rematch, and Beterbiev’s team stated that they were happy to do it.

=== Compubox stats ===
According to Compubox stats, Beterbiev landed 137 of 682 punches thrown (20%) and Bivol landed 142 of his 423 thrown (33.6%). Both landed 31 body shots each. Beterbiev had the edge in power shots out-landing Bivol 90 to 64 punches landed. Of the 12 rounds, ten of them were scored identical.

== Aftermath ==
The decision was received with mixed emotions from the crowd. Many believed Bivol did enough to win, but understood it was a razor-close fight. Speaking on the win, Beterbiev said, "Of course it's a tough fight because Dmitri is a champion, too. He has good skills, maybe better than me. But today, Allah chose me." Bivol felt he could have done more and promised to do more in the rematch. He said, "I did my job. I felt that I could do better. ... He is powerful, very powerful. And you see I have a bruise from my hand. He always beat it and it was so hard, even he reached my eye." Beterbiev's punch power broke through Bivol's defence on many occasions, which explained the bruising on his hand and the swelling on his eye. It was reported that they both took home a $10 million purse for the fight.

Calls for a rematch were made and was already looking likely a rematch would take place due to how close the fight was. A week later, Bivol and his team filed a protest with all four sanctioning bodies. His team knew the decision would not be overturned, but rather it was done to help force an immediate rematch. Bivol discussed the changes he would making during an interview. He said, “I want to improve more with my movements. I didn’t move enough. I felt I had to move more. More counterpunches. I just need to add more. I felt some moments where I could do it, but I was a little bit careful.” Bivol did not make any excuses for the loss.

On 17 October, the IBF ordered Beterbiev to make a mandatory defence against Michael Eifert (13–1, 5 KOs). Angry fans took to social media to voice their disappointment of the news as it would jeopardise a rematch between Bivol and Beterbiev to have all four titles on the line. Bob Arum was also frustrated with the mandatory order. He told a reporter, “It’s totally insane. It’s like a burden to be undisputed. I mean, the idea that you have to fight some non-entity to keep your title after you’ve won the biggest fight of your career seems crazy to me. This is ludicrous. They say, ‘These are our rules.’ Well, change the rules.” Arum only wanted Beterbiev to have big fights. Arum spoke to Dan Rafael on 21 October about the possible rematch. He explained because Riyadh Season ends in February, it meant the rematch could take place in October 2025. This could see both boxers having a fight in the interim.

== Rematch ==
A rematch was planned for Riyadh in February 2025, to close off Riyadh Season. On 2 December, the rematch was made official for 22 February for the undisputed light heavyweight title. This was considered a quick turnaround and left a gap of only four months between the two fights. The event took place in a smaller venue, the ANB Arena in Riyadh, in front of 7,000 fans. In another tactical chess fight, this time it was Bivol, who put on a skilful performance and gained revenge on Beterbiev via majority decision. One judge scored the bout 114–114, with the other two judges overriding the score with 116–112 and 115–113 for Bivol to crown him the undisputed champion, He also won the Ring Magazine belt and handed Beterbiev his first career loss.

== Fight card ==
Confirmed bouts:

Main Card
Weight class				Method	Round	Time	Notes
Light heavyweight	Artur Beterbiev (c)	def.	Dmitry Bivol (c)	MD	12	3:00	(Note: For WBC, IBF, WBO, WBA, IBO, and vacant The Ring light heavyweight titles)
Heavyweight	Fabio Wardley (c)	def.	Frazer Clarke	TKO	1/12	2:28	(Note: For British, Commonwealth and WBA Continental heavyweight titles)
Cruiserweight	Jai Opetaia (c)	def.	Jack Massey	TKO	6/12	2:00	(Note: For IBF and The Ring cruiserweight titles)
Middleweight	Chris Eubank Jr	def.	Kamil Szeremeta	KO	7/12	1:45	(Note: For vacant IBO middleweight title)
Featherweight	Skye Nicolson (c)	def.	Raven Chapman	UD	10	2:00	(Note: For WBC female featherweight title)
Light heavyweight	Benjamin Whittaker (c)	vs.	Liam Cameron	TD	5/10	3:00	(Note: For IBF International and WBO Global light heavyweight titles)
Super featherweight	Mohammed Alakel	def.	Jesus Gonzalez	UD	4	3:00
Prelims
Super welterweight	Marko Maric	def.	Christian Lopez Flores	UD	4/4	3:00

Preceded by vs. Callum Smith	Artur Beterbiev's bouts 12 October 2024	Succeeded by Rematch
Preceded by vs. Malik Zinad	Dmitry Bivol's bouts 12 October 2024	Succeeded by Rematch
