= Michael Eifert =

German boxer (born 1997)

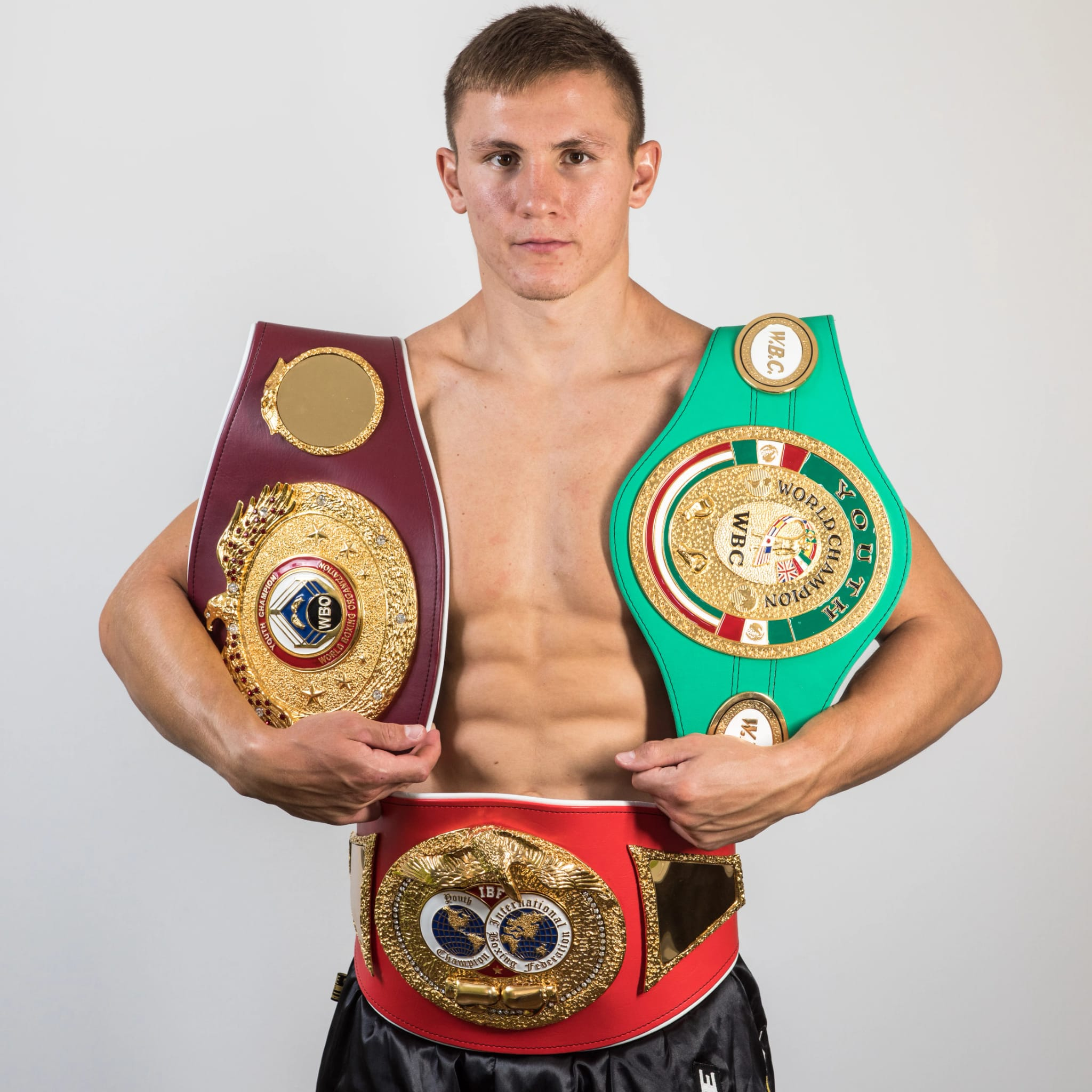

Personal information
- Nickname: Diesel
- Born: 30 December 1997 (age 28) Bautzen, Germany
- Height: 5 ft 11 in (1.80 m)
- Weight: Light heavyweight

Boxing career
- Stance: Orthodox

Boxing record
- Total fights: 15
- Wins: 13
- Win by KO: 5
- Losses: 2

Michael Eifert (born 30 December 1997) is a German professional boxer. He competes in the light-heavyweight division, where he challenged for the Unified light-heavyweight championship in 2026.

== Professional career ==
=== Early career ===
Eifert made his professional debut on 18 June 2018 in Germany. He beat Poland's Przemyslaw Binienda by unanimous decision. Eifert suffered an early setback in his career when he lost to fellow German Tom Dzemski. However, Eifert later avenged this loss to capture the IBF Youth Light Heavyweight title.

=== Eifert vs. Pascal ===
Eifert achieved the biggest win of his career against former WBA light-heavyweight challenger Jean Pascal. Despite Pascal being well past his best, Eifert was still the underdog. Eifert dominated the fight throughout, with Pascal looking every bit of the forty year old fighter he is. With the win, Eifert was upgraded to number one contender for the IBF light-heavyweight title.

== Professional boxing record ==
15 fights	13 wins	2 losses
By knockout	5	0
By decision	8	2

No.	Result	Record	Opponent	Type	Round, time	Date	Location	Notes
15	Loss	13–2	Dmitry Bivol	UD	12	30 May 2026	UMMC Arena, Yekaterinburg, Russia	For WBA (Super), IBF and The Ring light heavyweight titles
14	Win	13–1	Carlos Eduardo Jimenez	RTD	2 (6), 1:00	24 Aug 2024	Wolfgang-Lakenmacher-Halle, Magdeburg, Germany	
13	Win	12–1	Jean Pascal	UD	12	16 Mar 2023	Place Bell, Laval, Canada	
12	Win	11–1	Adriano Sperandio	UD	10	16 Jul 2022	Maritim Hotel, Magdeburg, Germany	Won vacant IBF Inter-Continental light heavyweight title
11	Win	10–1	Gyorgy Varju	KO	1 (6), 2:48	22 Apr 2022	Berg Tal Resort Lueneburger Heide, Bispingen, Germany	
10	Win	9–1	Nils Schmidt	KO	3 (10), 1:53	18 Dec 2021	Maritim Hotel, Magdeburg, Germany	Won the vacant BDB German light heavyweight title
9	Win	8–1	Tom Dzemski	MD	10	17 Jul 2021	Seebühne Elbauenpark, Magdeburg, Germany	Won IBF Youth and vacant WBC Youth light heavyweight titles.
8	Win	7–1	Dustin Ammann	UD	8	5 Jun 2021	Seebühne Elbauenpark, Magdeburg, Germany	Won vacant WBO Youth light heavyweight title
7	Loss	6–1	Tom Dzemski	MD	8	22 Aug 2020	Seebühne Elbauenpark, Magdeburg, Germany	For vacant IBF Youth light heavyweight title.
6	Win	6–0	Beka Aduashvili	UD	6	30 Nov 2019	Sportovni Hala Kladno, Kladno, Czech Republic	
5	Win	5–0	Stanislav Eschner	MD	6	11 May 2019	Stadthalle, Magdeburg, Germany	
4	Win	4–0	Istvan Zeller	UD	6	15 Dec 2018	Olympic Park “Feti Borova”, Tirana, Albania	
3	Win	3–0	Patrick Doering	TKO	2 (4), 2:00	17 Nov 2018	Anhalt Arena, Dessau-Roßlau, Germany	
2	Win	2–0	Ondrej Schwarz	KO	2 (4), 0:30	27 Oct 2018	Stadthalle, Weißenfels, Germany	
1	Win	1–0	Przemyslaw Binienda	UD	4	2 Jun 2018	weeArena, Bad Tölz, Germany	
