= Felix Valera =

Dominican Republic boxer (born 1988)

Personal information
- Nickname: Mangu
- Nationality: Dominican
- Born: 19 January 1988 (age 38) Santo Domingo, Dominican Republic
- Weight: Light-heavyweight

Boxing career

Boxing record
- Total fights: 33
- Wins: 24
- Win by KO: 21
- Losses: 9
Medal record
Men's amateur boxing
Representing Dominican Republic
Central American and Caribbean Games
Silver medal – second place	2010 Mayaguez	Middleweight

Felix Manuel Valera Alvarez (born 19 January 1988) is a Dominican professional boxer who held the WBA interim light-heavyweight title from 2015 to 2016. As an amateur Valera won a silver medal at the 2010 Central American and Caribbean Games in the middleweight weight category.

== Professional career ==
Valera won the interim WBA light-heavyweight title on 23 August 2015, defeating Stanyslav Kashtanov by split decision at Rixos Mriya Resort Hotel in Yalta, Russia.

In his first defense, he lost the title, and his unbeaten professional record, against Dmitry Bivol at Khodynka Ice Palace in Moscow, Russia, on 21 May 2016, going down to a unanimous decision loss.

== Professional boxing record ==
33 fights	24 wins	9 losses
By knockout	21	3
By decision	3	5
By disqualification	0	1

No.	Result	Record	Opponent	Type	Round, time	Date	Location	Notes
33	Loss	24–9	(United Kingdom) Pat Brown	KO	2 (10), 1:31	1 Nov 2025	Caribe Royale Orlando, Florida, United States	
32	Loss	24–8	(United States) Tristan Kalkreuth	UD	10	19 Apr 2025	(United States) Frontwave Arena, Oceanside, California, U.S.	
31	Win	24–7	(Dominican Republic) Angel Yomar Mateo Arias	TKO	5 (8) 0:10	7 Apr 2025	Santo Domingo, Dominican Republic	
30	Loss	23–7	(Poland) Michał Cieślak	TKO	3 (10), 0:04	26 Oct 2024	Nosalowy Dwór, Zakopane, Poland	
29	Loss	23–6	(Russia) Alexei Papin	TKO	5 (12), 2:23	30 Aug 2024	Ice Palace, Cherepovets, Russia	For vacant WBA Asia cruiserweight title
28	Win	23–5	(Dominican Republic) Francisco Suero Perez	KO	2 (10), 0:26	24 May 2024	Gimnasio de Boxeo Doctor Ramón Pina Acevedo, Santo Domingo Este, Dominican Republic	
27	Win	22–5	(Colombia) Alex Theran	TKO	2 (10), 0:15	24 Feb 2023	Pabellon de Esgrima, Centro Olimpico, Santo Domingo, Dominican Republic	
26	Win	21–5	(Venezuela) Ronald Gonzalez	KO	1 (10), 0:48	10 Nov 2022	Coco Locos Restaurant Sports Bar, Sosúa, Dominican Republic	
25	Win	20–5	(Mexico) Felipe Romero	TKO	7 (8), 2:43	22 Jul 2022	Coliseo Carlos 'Teo' Cruz, Santo Domingo, Dominican Republic	
24	Loss	19–5	(Russia) Maxim Vlasov	UD	10	24 Dec 2021	USC Soviet Wings, Moscow, Russia	
23	Win	19–4	(Venezuela) Reinaldo Gonzalez	RTD	3 (8), 3:00	26 May 2021	Coliseo Carlos 'Teo' Cruz, Santo Domingo, Dominican Republic	
22	Loss	18–4	(Dominican Republic) Bryan Perez Castillo	UD	10	12 Mar 2021	Hotel Catalonia Malecon Center, Santo Domingo, Dominican Republic	For vacant WBA Fedecaribe and WBC Latino light-heavyweight titles
21	Loss	18–3	(Ukraine) Vyacheslav Shabranskyy	DQ	8 (8), 2:01	14 Sep 2019	(United States) T-Mobile Arena, Paradise, Nevada, US	Valera disqualified for repeated low blows
20	Win	18–2	(Mexico) Mario Aguilar	KO	4 (8), 2:29	4 May 2019	(United States) Stockton Arena, Stockton, California, US	
19	Win	17–2	(Dominican Republic) Bryan Perez Castillo	UD	10	10 Nov 2018	Hotel Jaragua, Santo Domingo, Dominican Republic	
18	Win	16–2	(Colombia) Deibis Berrocal	TKO	8 (11), 1:42	17 Mar 2018	Hotel Jaragua, Santo Domingo, Dominican Republic	Won vacant WBA Fedelatin light-heavyweight title
17	Loss	15–2	(Cuba) Sullivan Barrera	UD	10	25 Nov 2017	(United States) The Theater at Madison Square Garden, New York City, New York, US	
16	Win	15–1	(Dominican Republic) Andy Perez	TKO	3 (10), 2:00	24 Jun 2017	Hotel Jaragua, Santo Domingo, Dominican Republic	
15	Win	14–1	(Venezuela) Gusmyr Perdomo	UD	10	16 Dec 2016	Maunoloa Night Club y Casino, Santo Domingo, Dominican Republic	
14	Loss	13–1	(Russia) Dmitry Bivol	UD	12	21 May 2016	Khodynka Ice Palace, Moscow, Russia	Lost WBA interim light-heavyweight title
13	Win	13–0	(Ukraine) Stanyslav Kashtanov	SD	12	23 Aug 2015	Rixos Mriya Resort Hotel, Yalta, Russia	Won vacant WBA interim light-heavyweight title
12	Win	12–0	(Dominican Republic) Emiliano Cayetano	KO	4 (11), 1:06	13 Dec 2014	Casa de los Clubes, Santo Domingo, Dominican Republic	Retained Dominican Republic super-middleweight title; Won vacant WBA Fedelatin super-middleweight title
11	Win	11–0	(Dominican Republic) Eduardo Mercedes	RTD	1 (12), 3:00	24 Oct 2014	Coliseo Pedro Julio Nolasco, La Romana, Dominican Republic	Won vacant Dominican Republic super-middleweight title
10	Win	10–0	(Dominican Republic) Aneudy Martes	RTD	1 (8), 3:00	10 Mar 2014	Polideportvo Eleoncio Mercedes, La Romana, Dominican Republic	
9	Win	9–0	(Dominican Republic) Modesto Felix	KO	1 (6), 2:56	16 Dec 2013	Casa de los Clubes, Santo Domingo, Dominican Republic	
8	Win	8–0	(Dominican Republic) Nelsido Miguel Agramonte	KO	1 (6), 0:42	24 Aug 2013	Hotel Dominican Fiesta, Santo Domingo, Dominican Republic	
7	Win	7–0	(Dominican Republic) Frank Mola	TKO	1 (8), 2:53	18 May 2013	Club Mauricio Baez, Santo Domingo, Dominican Republic	
6	Win	6–0	(Dominican Republic) Alexander Hernandez	TKO	1 (6), 0:56	9 Mar 2013	Coliseo Carlos 'Teo' Cruz, Santo Domingo, Dominican Republic	
5	Win	5–0	(Dominican Republic) Ramon Jimenez	TKO	1 (10), 1:58	2 Feb 2013	Club el Millon, Santo Domingo, Dominican Republic	
4	Win	4–0	(Dominican Republic) Basilio Silva	RTD	1 (8), 3:00	17 Dec 2012	Dominican Fiesta Hotel & Casino, Santo Domingo, Dominican Republic	
3	Win	3–0	(Dominican Republic) Jonali Reyes	RTD	2 (6), 3:00	10 Nov 2012	Club el Millon, Santo Domingo, Dominican Republic	
2	Win	2–0	(Dominican Republic) Geovanny Ascencio	TKO	1 (4), 0:55	18 Oct 2012	Club el Millon, Santo Domingo, Dominican Republic	
1	Win	1–0	(Dominican Republic) Jose Morla	KO	1 (4), 0:24	28 Sep 2012	Casa Puerto Rico, La Romana, Dominican Republic	

Sporting positions
Regional boxing titles
New title	Dominican Republic super-middleweight champion 24 October 2014 – 23 August 2015; Won WBA interim title	Vacant Title next held by Brayan Pena
Vacant Title last held by Junior Talipeau	WBA Fedelatin super-middleweight champion 13 December 2014 – 23 August 2015; Won WBA interim title	Vacant Title next held by Bobby Gunn Jr
Vacant Title last held by Gusmyr Perdomo	WBA Fedelatin light-heavyweight champion 17 March 2018 – present	Incumbent
World boxing titles
Vacant Title last held by Silvio Branco	WBA light-heavyweight champion Interim title 23 August 2015 – 21 May 2016	Succeeded by Dmitry Bivol
