= Cedric Agnew =

American boxer

Personal information
- Born: December 11, 1986 (age 39) South Chicago Heights, Illinois, U.S.
- Height: 6 ft (183 cm)
- Weight: Light heavyweight Cruiserweight

Boxing career
- Stance: Orthodox

Boxing record
- Total fights: 32
- Wins: 29
- Win by KO: 15
- Losses: 3

Cedric Agnew (born December 11, 1986) is an American professional boxer. He challenged once for the WBO light heavyweight title in 2014.

== Amateur career ==
Agnew is a former national Golden Gloves runner-up.

== Regional title fights ==
=== United States Boxing Council (USNBC) title ===
Agnew knocked out Daniel Judah for the USNBC title, a regional title affiliated with the World Boxing Council. He successfully defended the title against Otis Griffin by decision.

=== United States Boxing Association (USBA) title ===
Agnew defeated Yusaf Mack by decision for the USBA title, a regional title affiliated with the International Boxing Federation.

== World title opportunity ==
Agnew lost to Sergey Kovalev for the World Boxing Organization world title by 7th round knockout.

== Post-world title opportunity ==
Agnew fought Dmitry Bivol on the undercard of Andre Ward vs. Sergey Kovalev II, but the fight was not for Bivol's World Boxing Association interim world title, Bivol stopped Agnew in the 4th round.

== Professional boxing record ==
32 fights	29 wins	3 losses
By knockout	15	2
By decision	14	1

No.	Result	Record	Opponent	Type	Round, time	Date	Location	Notes
32	Loss	29–3	(Russia) Dmitry Bivol	TKO	4 (10), 1:27	2017-06-17	(United States) Mandalay Bay Hotel and Casino, Las Vegas, Nevada, USA	
31	Win	29–2	(United States) Martin Verdin	TKO	2 (8), 2:00	2017-02-11	(United States) Hard Rock Hotel and Casino, Biloxi, Mississippi, USA	
30	Win	28–2	(United States) Kevin Engel	UD	6	2015-08-27	(United States) Bayou Event Center, Houston, Texas, USA	
29	Loss	27–2	(United States) Samuel Clarkson	SD	8	2015-02-20	(United States) Hilton Westchester, Rye Brook, New York, USA	
28	Win	27–1	(United States) Shannon Miller	RTD	2 (6), 0:10	2014-06-27	(United States) Houston Athletic Fencing Center, Houston, Texas, USA	
27	Loss	26–1	(Russia) Sergey Kovalev	KO	7 (12), 0:58	2014-03-29	(United States) Boardwalk Hall, Atlantic City, New Jersey, USA	For WBO Light heavyweight title.
26	Win	26–0	(United States) Yusaf Mack	UD	12	2013-04-12	(United States) Four Winds New Buffalo, New Buffalo Township, Michigan, USA	Won USBA Light heavyweight title.
25	Win	25–0	(Mexico) Alfredo Contreras	UD	6	2012-12-15	(United States) Toyota Center, Houston, Texas, USA	
24	Win	24–0	(United States) Zack Page	MD	6	2012-08-09	(United States) The Houston Club, Houston, Texas, USA	
23	Win	23–0	(United States) Otis Griffin	UD	12	2012-05-03	(United States) Anatole Hotel, Dallas, Texas, USA	Retained WBC United States (USNBC) Light heavyweight title.
22	Win	22–0	(United States) Billy Cunningham	TKO	3 (6), 2:30	2012-02-11	(United States) Houston Athletic Fencing Center, Houston, Texas, USA	
21	Win	21–0	(United States) Mikel Williams	TKO	2 (4), 1:53	2011-12-08	(United States) The Houston Club, Houston, Texas, USA	
20	Win	20–0	(United States) Daniel Judah	KO	6 (12), 2:45	2011-11-03	(United States) Dallas Petroleum Club, Dallas, Texas, USA	Won vacant WBC United States (USNBC) Light heavyweight title.
19	Win	19–0	(United States) Chuck Dillard	UD	4	2011-09-29	(United States) The Houston Club, Houston, Texas, USA	
18	Win	18–0	(United States) Tyrone Jackson	TKO	2 (6), 1:29	2011-08-20	(United States) Houston Athletic Fencing Center, Houston, Texas, USA	
17	Win	17–0	(United States) Jerome Johnson	TKO	4 (6), 1:06	2011-06-25	(United States) Houston Athletic Fencing Center, Houston, Texas, USA	
16	Win	16–0	(United States) Moses Robinson	KO	3 (6), 1:28	2011-05-12	(United States) Dallas, Texas, USA	
15	Win	15–0	(United States) David Robinson	KO	2 (6), 1:40	2011-04-23	(United States) WinStar Casino, Thackerville, Oklahoma, USA	
14	Win	14–0	(United States) Tyrone Jackson	UD	4	2011-02-25	(United States) Music Hall, Austin, Texas, USA	
13	Win	13–0	(United States) Anthony Greeley	TKO	3 (4), 2:19	2011-02-12	(United States) Oberlin, Louisiana, USA	
12	Win	12–0	(United States) David Robinson	KO	1 (4), 1:21	2011-01-27	(United States) The Houston Club, Houston, Texas, USA	
11	Win	11–0	(United States) Rubin Williams	UD	8	2009-04-30	(United States) Anatole Hotel, Dallas, Texas, USA	
10	Win	10–0	(United States) Demetrius Jenkins	UD	6	2008-11-21	(United States) Horseshoe Casino Hammond, Hammond, Indiana, USA	
9	Win	9–0	(United States) Terrance Smith	MD	6	2008-09-19	(United States) Cicero Stadium, Cicero, Illinois, USA	
8	Win	8–0	(United States) Rayco Saunders	UD	10	2008-05-01	(United States) Anatole Hotel, Dallas, Texas, USA	Won vacant WBC Continental Americas Light heavyweight title.
7	Win	7–0	(United States) Mike Word	UD	6	2008-02-09	(United States) Civic Auditorium, La Porte, Indiana, USA	
6	Win	6–0	(United States) Roni Algus Krull	TKO	3 (4), 1:16	2007-11-03	(United States) Riehle Brothers Pavilion, Lafayette, Indiana, USA	
5	Win	5–0	(United States) Lucas St Clair	UD	4	2007-10-19	(United States) Cicero Stadium, Cicero, Illinois, USA	
4	Win	4–0	(United States) Ryan Madigan	KO	1 (4), 1:01	2007-08-25	(United States) Lansing Center, Lansing, Michigan, USA	
3	Win	3–0	(United States) Gregory Holmes	TKO	2 (6), 2:16	2007-04-18	(United States) Sears Centre Arena, Hoffman Estates, Illinois, USA	
2	Win	2–0	(United States) Larry Carter	PTS	6	2007-02-02	(United States) Racquet Club, Chicago, Illinois, USA	
1	Win	1–0	(United States) Clark Williams	KO	2 (4), 1:08	2007-01-13	(United States) Moose Lodge, Lafayette, Indiana, USA	Professional debut.
