= Houston Club =

Private members' club in Texas, USA

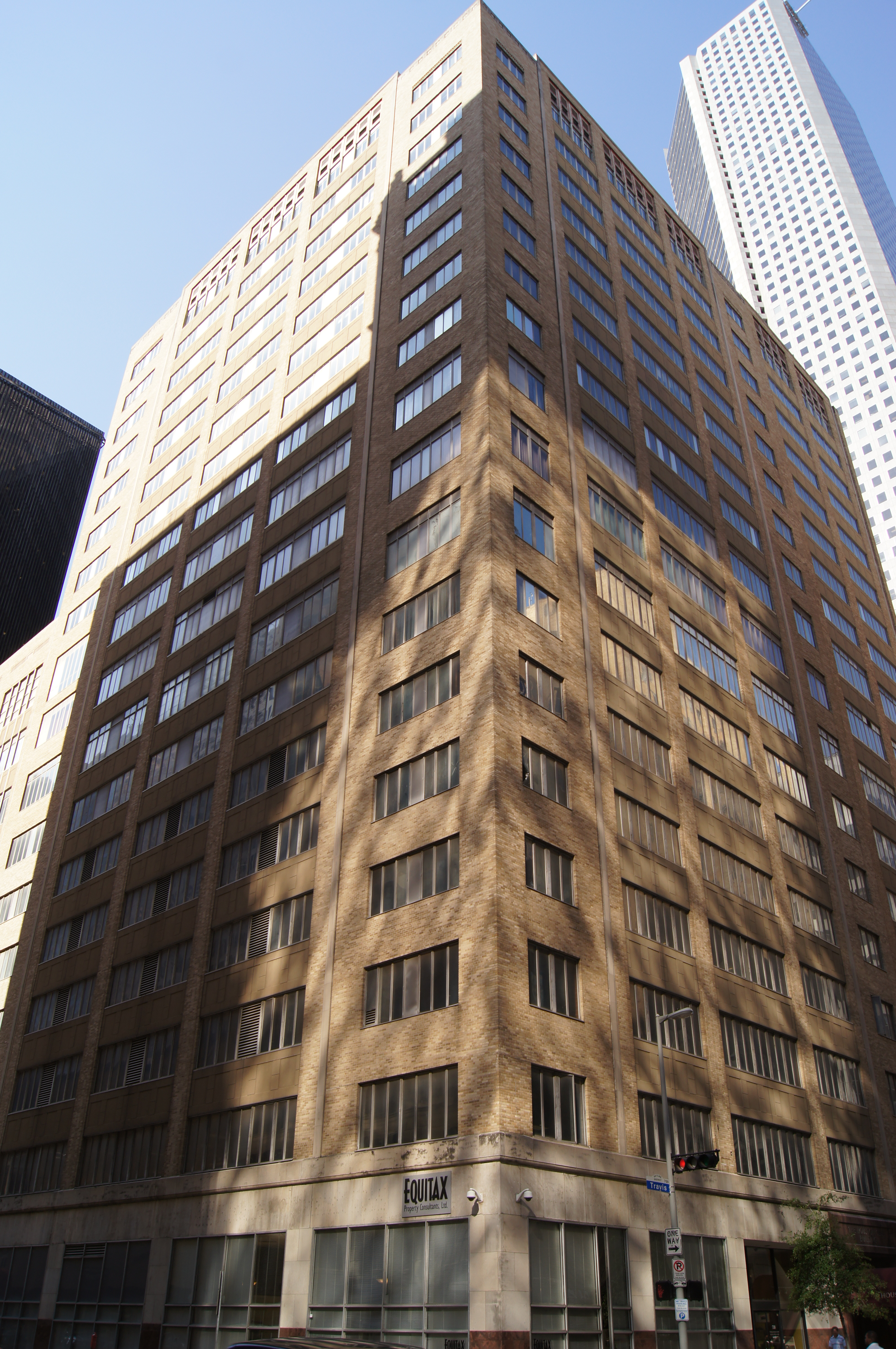
Houston Club building

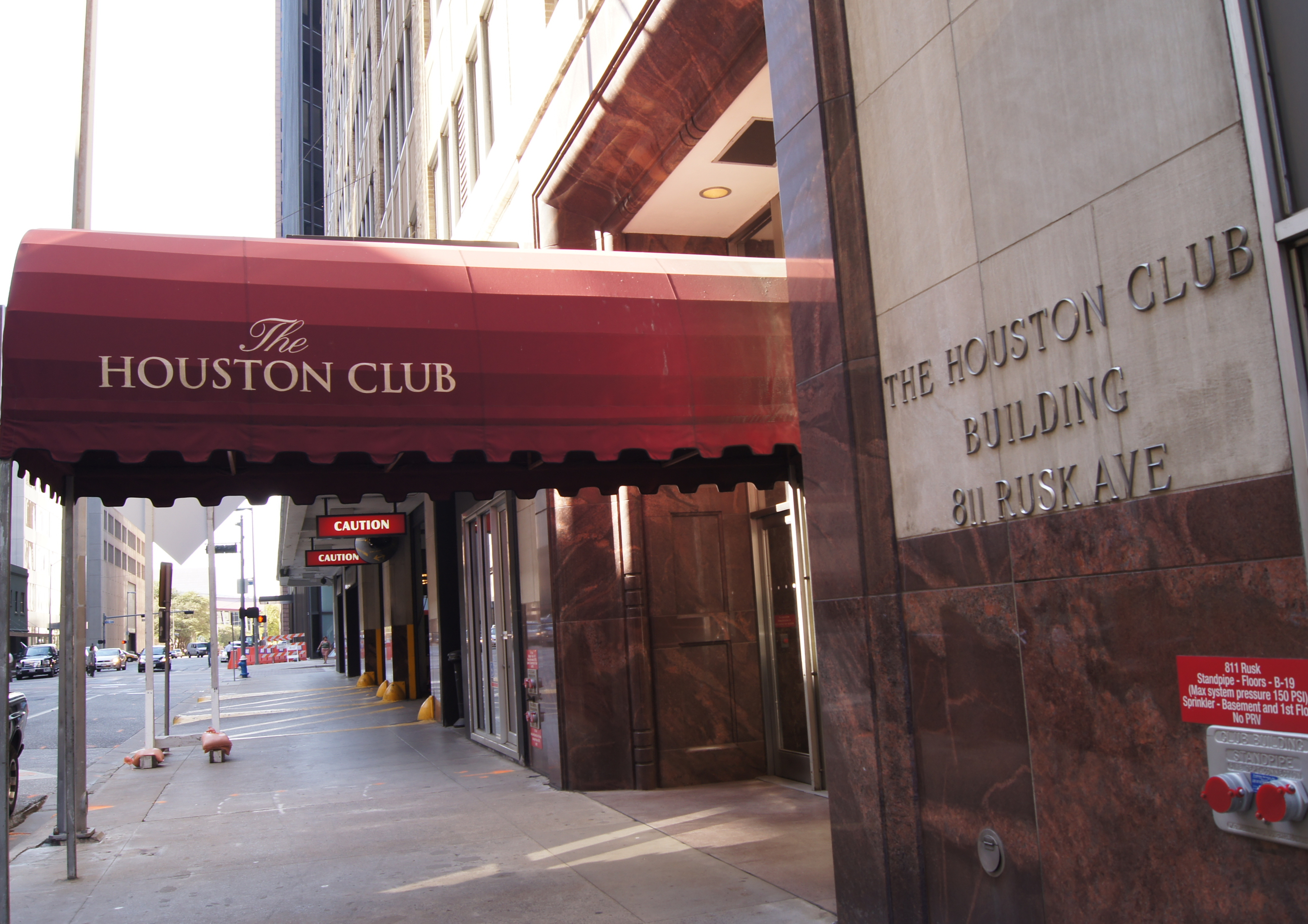
Entrance to the Houston Club

The Houston Club is a private members' club in Houston, Texas. The club is managed by Inspired.

The club has occupied six locations, the Mason Building (1894–1904), the Chronicle Building (1909–1923), the Chamber of Commerce Building I (1923–1930), the Chamber of Commerce Building II (1930–1955), the Houston Club Building (1955–2012), and One Shell Plaza (2013–present). In 2019, One Shell Plaza was renamed to 910 Louisiana.

It operates under laws for 501(c)(7) Social and Recreation Clubs. In 2025 it claimed $33,057 in total revenue and $940,946 in total assets.

== History ==
The club was established in 1894. In 1954, the Houston Club moved to 811 Rusk, an 18-story building with 348,000 square feet (32,300 m^{2}) of rentable space and a parking garage. Jesse Jones designed the building, also known as the "Houston Club Building", for the club. As of October 2011, the Houston Club occupied 100,000 square feet (9,300 m^{2}) of space and paid a below market leasing rate. The club was bought out of their lease in 2012.

Cameron-811 Rusk Limited Partners then owned the 811 Rusk building. In March 2010 it filed for bankruptcy, which delayed an impending foreclosure. In September Wells Fargo foreclosed. Cameron-811 Rusk said that, because of the club's low lease rate, the owners could not make a profit. Jennifer Dawson of the Houston Business Journal said that 811 Rusk had "been in danger of foreclosure for some time". As of September 2010, according to the Harris County Appraisal District, the owner of the building was Redus Tx Properties LLC, a bank entity. The building had a value of almost $8.5 million, according to tax records. By May 2011, Skanska was under contract to buy the building. In September 2011 Skanska USA Commercial Development bought the building.

In January 2013, The Houston Club joined forces with ClubCorp and relocated to the 49th floor of the One Shell Plaza building. The club underwent a $3.5 million renovation led by Gensler.

== Facilities ==
The club offers two private member dining areas, three boardrooms and four ballrooms. The club's George and Barbara Bush Ballroom can seat up to 220 guests and has the highest views in downtown Houston.

== See also ==
- List of traditional gentlemen's clubs in the United States
