= Sullivan Barrera =

Cuban boxer (born 1982)

Personal information
- Born: 25 February 1982 (age 44) Guantanamo Bay, Cuba
- Height: 1.88 m (6 ft 2 in)
- Weight: Light heavyweight

Boxing career
- Reach: 185 cm (73 in)
- Stance: Orthodox

Boxing record
- Total fights: 27
- Wins: 22
- Win by KO: 14
- Losses: 5
Medal record
Men's boxing
Representing Cuba
AIBA Junior World Championships.
Gold medal – first place	Budapest 2000	Middleweight

Sullivan Barrera (born 25 February 1982) is a Cuban professional boxer. As an amateur, he won the middleweight gold medal at the 2000 AIBA Junior World Championships. He challenged once for the WBA light heavyweight title in 2018.

== Amateur career ==
Barrera won the gold medal at the 2000 AIBA Junior World Championships as a middleweight. In that tournament, Barrera defeated Chad Dawson in the semi-finals and Imre Szellő in the final. Barrera took the bronze medal at Torneo Playa Girón in 2002 and 2003. Barrera's record as an amateur was 285–27.

Barrera defected to the United States in 2009, after two previous failed attempts.

== Professional career ==
=== Early career ===
Barrera made his professional debut in August 2009. He won his first five fights by way of knockout. On his 7th fight, Barrera won the WBA Fedelatin and the interim WBO Latino light heavyweight titles. Barrera was ranked by the WBA and the WBC as one of the top 15 light heavyweight contenders early in his career. Barrera trained with Gennady Golovkin's coach, Abel Sanchez. In November 2014, Barrera defeated Rowland Bryant in the undercard of Hopkins-Kovalev.

=== Title contender ===
==== Barrera vs. Murat ====
In December 2015, Barrera faced Karo Murat in an IBF eliminator, the winner was to become Sergey Kovalev's mandatory challenger. The IBF had previously ordered Barrera to fight Artur Beterbiev and Igor Mikhalkin but negotiations for both of those bouts fell through. Barrera blasted Murat, dropping him in round 4 before stopping him in round 5. Barrera and Kovalev were both signed to Kathy Duva's promotional outfit at the time, Main Events.

==== Barrera vs. Ward ====
Barrera next faced former unified super middleweight champion, Andre Ward. Ward was moving up to light heavyweight. The fight took place at Ward's hometown Oracle Arena. En route to a wide unanimous decision victory, Ward dropped Barrera to the canvas in the third round as he turned a left hook while on the ropes. Barrera was also dropped in the eighth round from a low blow. Referee Raul Caiz Sr. saw it and deducted a point from Ward. Ward dictated the pace for the vast majority of the bout, showcasing good strength and ring generalship against Barrera. The three judges scored the fight 117–109, 119–109, and 117–108. Ward landed 166 from 463 thrown (36%) whilst Barrera landed 111 of 722 punches thrown (15%). When asked about the potential mega fight against Kovalev, Ward said, "It's never a problem. You look at my track record. I want to fight the best. I've always fought the best. Sergey Kovalev, he's a great champion." For the fight, Ward earned $1.85 million and Barrera earned a $450,000 purse. The fight averaged 1.064 million viewers and peaked at 1.152 million viewers. After the loss, Barrera parted ways with Abel Sanchez.

==== Barrera vs. Shabranskyy ====
Following the loss to Ward, Barrera agreed to fight undefeated contender Vyacheslav Shabranskyy. The fight took place at the Fantasy Springs Casino in Indio, California in December 2016. Barrera exploited Shabranskyy's defensive weaknesses to stop Shabrankskyy in the seventh round. Barrera hit the ground running, knocking Shabranskyy down in the first round. The latter would return the favour in round 2, dropping Barrera with a combination of punches following a check left hook. As the rounds progressed, Barrera established his rhythm and started breaking Shabranskyy down. Shabranskyy would go down once again in round 5 after a one-two combo. Round 7 would be the end for Shabranskyy, as he was knocked down with an overhand left. He was able to get up but the referee waived the count.

==== Barrera vs. Smith ====
On 12 May, deal was in place confirmed for a fight between Barrera and Joe Smith Jr. Early reports indicated the fight would be part of a HBO triple-header also featuring Miguel Berchelt defending his WBC super featherweight title against mandated Takashi Miura on 15 July 2017 in Inglewood, California. The fight was officially confirmed on 18 May and shown live on HBO: Boxing After Dark. Smith knocked Barrera down in round one with a left hook to the head, but Barrera dominated the rest of the fight and went on to win via unanimous decision (97–92, 97–92, 96–93) after 10 rounds. Smith was beaten to the punch in almost every round, only landing 61 of his 320 punches thrown (19%), whilst Barrera was more accurate in landing 187 of 484 thrown (39%). In round 4, Smith was hit with a clean uppercut and by the end of round 6, his team urged him to go for a knockout. Referee Jack Reiss had the ringside doctor take a look at Smith after the seventh, but the fight continued. Ringtv scored the fight wider 98–91, only giving Smith two rounds. There was confusion in Barrera's corner as well as the HBO commentary team in regards to the fight being 10 rounds instead of 12. The referee told both boxers to touch gloves at the start of the 10th round. At first the HBO commentary thought the referee had made a mistake, but were later told, both fighters agreed to the fight being 10 rounds. The fight averaged 617,000 viewers on HBO and peaked at 719,000 viewers.

A few days later, Smith released a statement on social media that he had broken his jaw and believed to have broken it in round two, “Somewhere during the second round I was injured and was in a lot of pain, but I did not want to let it show and I refused to quit.” As the fight went on, he admitted the pain got worse and the fight got tougher. On 20 July Smith had surgery to repair his broken jaw.

==== Barrera vs. Valera ====
After Andre Ward retired and vacated his world titles, the WBA elevated interim champion Dmitry Bivol to full champion. He was announced to be fighting Trent Broadhurst, ranked #11 at the time, for its vacant world title. The announcement was met with incredulity by the media, due to many fighters ranked above Broadhurst being available. Barrera also took to Twitter to express his displeasure at being overlooked, as he was ranked #2 at the time. Barrera is scheduled to return on November on the undercard of Kovalev-Shabranskyy. Barrera was reportedly offered to fight Kovalev but he rejected it. ESPN later reported that Barrera would be facing Felix Valera. Kathy Duva, Barrera's promoter, later stated that Barrera would become mandatory challenger to Bivol, after the latter's win over Broadhurst.

Barrera continued his winning streak with a unanimous decision (98–88, 97–90, 97–89) win over Valera. Barrera was dropped for the fourth time in his last five fights halfway through the first round, as Valera dropped him with a left hook. Barrera would return the favour and knock Valera down towards the end of that same round. The remainder of the fight saw Barrera out-box Valera and win most rounds. The fight was characterized by both fighters trading low blows, with Valera being deducted points for constant fouling in rounds 3, 6, and 8, while Barrera lost a point in round 9.

==== Barrera vs Bivol ====
In his next fight, Barrera fought for a world title for the first time in his career, against WBA light heavyweight champion Dmitry Bivol. Bivol dominated throughout the fight, which culminated in a big right hand to Barrera's temple in the final round that dropped the Cuban boxer. Barrera was determined to beat the count, but the referee saw he was in no condition to do so, and Bivol was awarded the TKO victory, handling Barrera his second career loss, his only loss previously coming against Andre Ward.

==== Barrera vs Monaghan ====
Barrera battled Sean Monaghan in his following fight. It was a one-sided victory for the Cuban, who won convincingly on all judges' scorecards, 99–91 twice and 98–92, while also hurting and bloodying Monaghan in the process.

==== Barrera vs Hart ====
On 15 June 2019, Barrera fought Jesse Hart, who had moved up to light heavyweight prior to the fight. The bout was rough, with both boxers doing plenty of holding and hitting during breaks. Barrera managed to land clean shots throughout the fight, but Hart, despite his technical flaws, did enough in the eyes of all three judges to win the bout, while also scoring one knockdown in the process. This earned Hart his first victory at light heavyweight, and was Barrera's third career defeat.

== Professional boxing record ==
26 fights	22 wins	4 losses
By knockout	14	2
By decision	8	2

No.	Result	Record	Opponent	Type	Round, time	Date	Location	Notes
26	Loss	22–4	Gilberto Ramírez	KO	4 (12), 2:38	9 Jul 2021	Banc of California Stadium, Los Angeles, California, U.S.	For NABF light-heavyweight title
25	Loss	22–3	Jesse Hart	UD	10	15 Jun 2019	MGM Grand Garden Arena, Paradise, Nevada, U.S.	
24	Win	22–2	Sean Monaghan	UD	10	3 Nov 2018	Aviator Sports and Events Center, New York City, New York, U.S.	
23	Loss	21–2	Dmitry Bivol	TKO	12 (12), 1:41	3 Mar 2018	The Theater at Madison Square Garden, New York City, New York, U.S.	For WBA light heavyweight title
22	Win	21–1	Felix Valera	UD	10	25 Nov 2017	The Theater at Madison Square Garden, New York City, New York, U.S.	
21	Win	20–1	Joe Smith Jr.	UD	10	15 Jul 2017	The Forum, Inglewood, California, U.S.	Won WBC International light heavyweight title
20	Win	19–1	Paul Parker	TKO	5 (10), 2:08	15 Apr 2017	Mohegan Sun Casino, Montville, Connecticut, U.S.	
19	Win	18–1	Vyacheslav Shabranskyy	TKO	7 (10), 2:05	16 Dec 2016	Fantasy Springs Resort Casino, Indio, California, U.S.	
18	Loss	17–1	Andre Ward	UD	12	26 Mar 2016	Oracle Arena, Oakland, California, U.S.	
17	Win	17–0	Karo Murat	KO	5 (12), 0:25	12 Dec 2015	Civic Auditorium, Glendale, California, U.S.	
16	Win	16–0	Hakim Zoulikha	TKO	8 (10), 1:24	25 Jul 2015	Mandalay Bay Events Center, Paradise, Nevada, U.S.	
15	Win	15–0	Jeff Lacy	TKO	4 (8), 2:05	30 Jan 2015	Foxwoods Resort, Ledyard, Connecticut, U.S.	
14	Win	14–0	Rowland Bryant	RTD	4 (8), 3:00	8 Nov 2014	Boardwalk Hall, Atlantic City, New Jersey, U.S.	
13	Win	13–0	Eric Watkins	TKO	6 (8)	20 Sep 2014	Foxwoods Resort, Ledyard, Connecticut, U.S.	
12	Win	12–0	Lee Campbell	KO	6 (8), 2:42	21 Jun 2014	Mohegan Sun Pocono Downs, Wilkes-Barre, Pennsylvania, U.S.	
11	Win	11–0	Larry Pryor	UD	6	4 Apr 2014	Liacouras Center, Philadelphia, Pennsylvania, U.S.	
10	Win	10–0	Joell Godfrey	UD	6	14 Dec 2013	Scala Bay Club, Miami, Florida, U.S.	
9	Win	9–0	Damar Singleton	UD	6	21 Jan 2012	Asylum Arena, Philadelphia, Pennsylvania, U.S.	
8	Win	8–0	Frank Paines	KO	2 (10), 1:16	24 Jun 2011	Dade County Auditorium, Miami, Florida, U.S.	Won vacant WBA Fedelatin and WBO Latino interim light heavyweight titles
7	Win	7–0	Epifanio Mendoza	UD	4	16 Apr 2011	Coliseo Rubén Rodríguez, Bayamón, Puerto Rico	
6	Win	6–0	Willie Herring	UD	6	22 Oct 2010	Miccosukee Indian Gaming Resort, Miami, Florida, U.S.	
5	Win	5–0	Tay Bledsoe	TKO	1 (4), 1:35	13 Aug 2010	A La Carte Event Pavilion, Tampa, Florida, U.S.	
4	Win	4–0	DeLeon Tinsley	TKO	2 (6), 1:35	30 Apr 2010	Convention Center, Miami, Florida, U.S.	
3	Win	3–0	Reggie Pena	KO	2 (4), 2:13	12 Mar 2010	War Memorial Auditorium, Fort Lauderdale, Florida, U.S.	
2	Win	2–0	Alex Rivera	KO	1 (4), 1:13	27 Feb 2010	Electricians Union Hall, Miami, Florida, U.S.	
1	Win	1–0	Anthony Adorno	TKO	1 (4), 0:57	21 Aug 2009	Resort & Spa, Miami Beach, Florida, U.S.	
