= Vyacheslav Shabranskyy =

Ukrainian professional boxer (born 1987)

Personal information
- Nickname: Lion Heart
- Nationality: Ukrainian
- Born: 1 May 1987 (age 39) Zhytomyr, Ukrainian SSR, Soviet Union
- Height: 6 ft 3 1/2 in (192 cm)
- Weight: Light-heavyweight; Cruiserweight

Boxing career
- Reach: 75 in (191 cm)
- Stance: Orthodox

Boxing record
- Total fights: 24
- Wins: 21
- Win by KO: 17
- Losses: 2
- Draws: 1

Vyacheslav "Slava" Shabranskyy (Ukrainian: В'ячеслав Вікторович Шабранський; born 1 May 1987) is a Ukrainian professional boxer who challenged for the WBO light-heavyweight title in 2017.

== Amateur career ==
Vyacheslav Shabranskyy competed in the World Series of Boxing competition as a member of the Matadores team. In that competition he defeated future Irish Olympian and Silver Medalist Kenneth Egan.

== Professional career ==
Vyacheslav Shabranskyy made his professional debut in 2012, winning via first-round knockout against Bryan McGlory. He is signed with American boxing promoters Golden Boy Promotions. Shabrankskyy holds notable wins over Yunieski Gonzalez, Paul Parker and Derrick Findley.

== Professional boxing record ==
23 fights	21 wins	2 losses
By knockout	17	2
By decision	3	0
By disqualification	1	0

No.	Result	Record	Opponent	Type	Round, time	Date	Location	Notes
23	Win	21–2	(Dominican Republic) Felix Valera	DQ	8 (8), 2:01	14 Sep 2019	(United States) T-Mobile Arena, Paradise, Nevada, US	Valera disqualified for repeated low blows
22	Win	20–2	(Mexico) Gilberto Rubio	RTD	4 (8), 3:00	10 May 2019	(United States) Burbank Marriott, Burbank, California, US	
21	Loss	19–2	(Russia) Sergey Kovalev	TKO	2 (12) 2:36	25 Nov 2017	(United States) The Theater at Madison Square Garden, New York City, New York, US	For vacant WBO, IBA, and EBP light-heavyweight titles
20	Win	19–1	(United States) Todd Unthank May	RTD	7 (10), 3:00	4 Aug 2017	(United States) Fantasy Springs Resort Casino, Indio, California, US	Won vacant WBC–USNBC light-heavyweight title
18	Win	18–1	(United States) Larry Pryor	KO	2 (8), 0:54	20 Apr 2017	(United States) Turning Stone Resort and Casino, Verona, New York, US	
18	Loss	17–1	(Cuba) Sullivan Barrera	KO	7 (10), 2:05	16 Dec 2016	(United States) Fantasy Springs Resort Casino, Indio, California, US	For vacant WBC–USNBC light-heavyweight title
17	Win	17–0	(Mexico) Oscar Riojas	KO	3 (8), 1:43	19 Aug 2016	(United States) Belasco Theater, Los Angeles, California, US	
16	Win	16–0	(United States) Derrick Findley	RTD	3 (8), 3:00	15 Apr 2016	(United States) Belasco Theater, Los Angeles, California, US	
15	Win	15–0	(Cuba) Yunieski Gonzalez	MD	10	19 Dec 2015	(United States) Turning Stone Resort and Casino, Verona, New York, US	
14	Win	14–0	(United States) Paul Parker	TKO	3 (10), 2:36	30 Jun 2015	(United States) 2300 Arena, Philadelphia, Pennsylvania, US	
13	Win	13–0	(Brazil) Fabiano Pena	RTD	5 (10), 3:00	12 Mar 2015	(United States) Freeman Coliseum, San Antonio, Texas, US	Won vacant WBC–USNBC light-heavyweight title
12	Win	12–0	(United States) Garrett Wilson	RTD	9 (10), 3:00	17 Jan 2015	(United States) MGM Grand Garden Arena, Paradise, Nevada, US	
11	Win	11–0	(Puerto Rico) Emil Gonzalez	RTD	2 (10), 3:00	8 Nov 2014	(United States) Boardwalk Hall, Atlantic City, New Jersey, US	
10	Win	10–0	(United States) Demetrius Walker	KO	1 (6), 0:48	25 Jul 2014	(United States) Fantasy Springs Casino, Indio, California, US	
9	Win	9–0	(Ghana) Michael Gbenga	UD	6	21 Jun 2014	(United States) StubHub Center, Carson, California, US	
8	Win	8–0	(United States) Paul Vasquez	KO	1 (8), 0:23	20 May 2014	(United States) Santa Monica Pier, Santa Monica, California, US	
7	Win	7–0	(United States) Lamont Williams	KO	7 (8), 1:37	6 Feb 2014	(United States) Florentine Gardens, Hollywood, California, US	
6	Win	6–0	(Mexico) Rafael Valenzuela	KO	2 (6), 1:58	14 Nov 2013	(United States) Florentine Gardens, Hollywood, California, US	
5	Win	5–0	(United States) Harry Gopaul	KO	2 (6), 2:23	9 Aug 2013	(United States) Quiet Cannon, Montebello, California, US	
4	Win	4–0	(United States) D'Quan Morgan	UD	6	13 Jul 2013	(United States) Hollywood Park Casino, Inglewood, California, US	
3	Win	3–0	(United States) Emannuel Wright	TKO	4 (6), 2:18	14 Mar 2013	(United States) Florentine Gardens, Hollywood, California, US	
2	Win	2–0	(United States) Michael Glenn	KO	2 (4), 1:50	21 Dec 2012	(United States) Florentine Gardens, Hollywood, California, US	
1	Win	1–0	(United States) Byran McGlory	KO	1 (4), 1:49	20 Sep 2012	(United States) Florentine Gardens, Hollywood, California, US	
