= UMMC Arena (Yekaterinburg) =

Sporting arena in Yekaterinburg, Russia

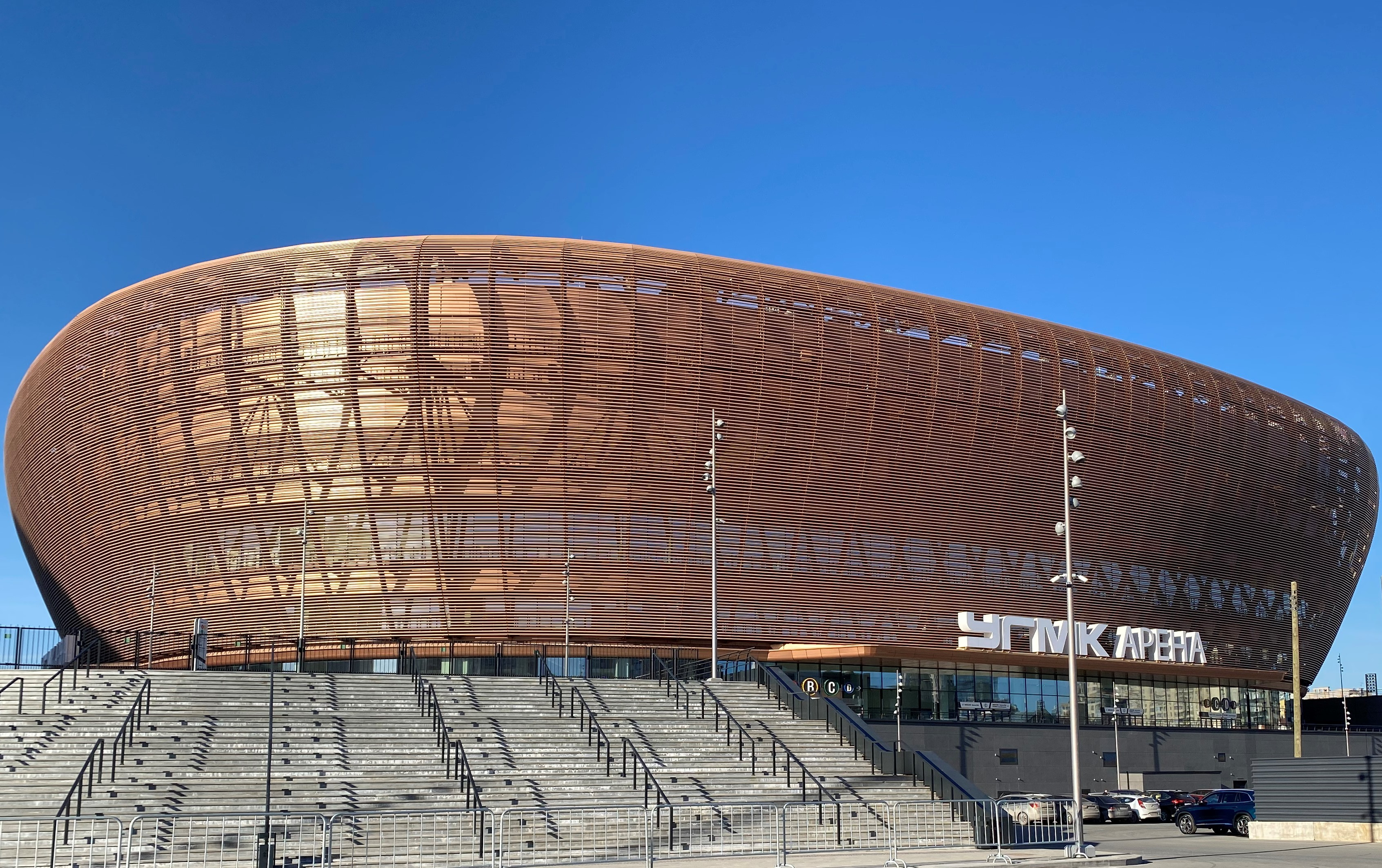
- Interactive map of UMMC Arena
- Location: Yekaterinburg, Russia
- Coordinates: 56.8246°N 60.6092°E
- Owner: UMMC
- Capacity: Ice hockey 12,588

Construction
- Groundbreaking: 31 October 2019
- Opened: 1 February 2025

Tenants
- Avtomobilist Yekaterinburg (KHL) (2025–present)

UMMC Arena is an indoor sporting arena located in Yekaterinburg, Russia. It is used for various indoor events and is the home arena of the Avtomobilist Yekaterinburg ice hockey club. The capacity of the arena is 12,588 spectators.

The grand opening of the UMMC Arena took place on 10 March 2025.

== Gallery ==
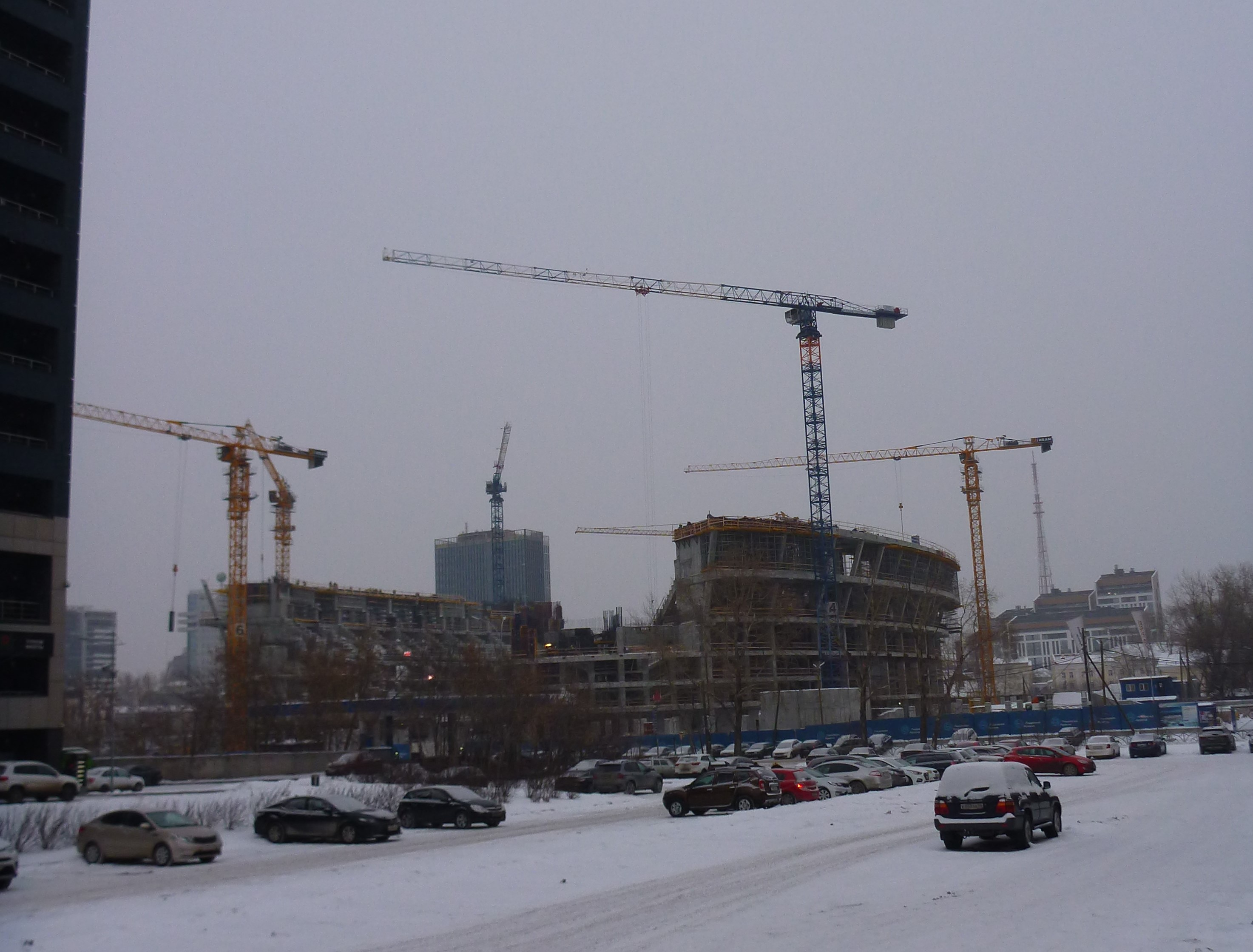
December 2020

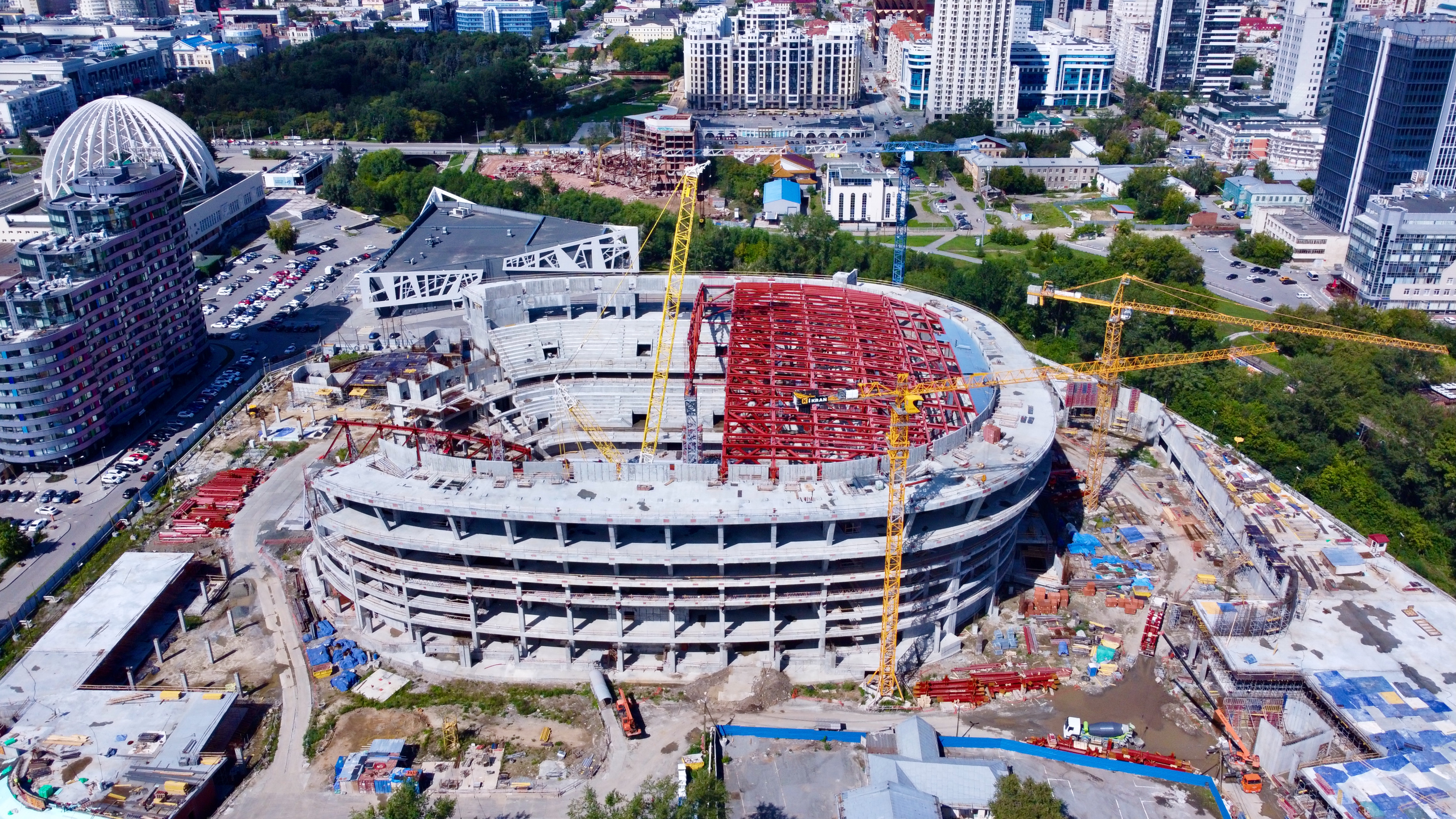
August 2021

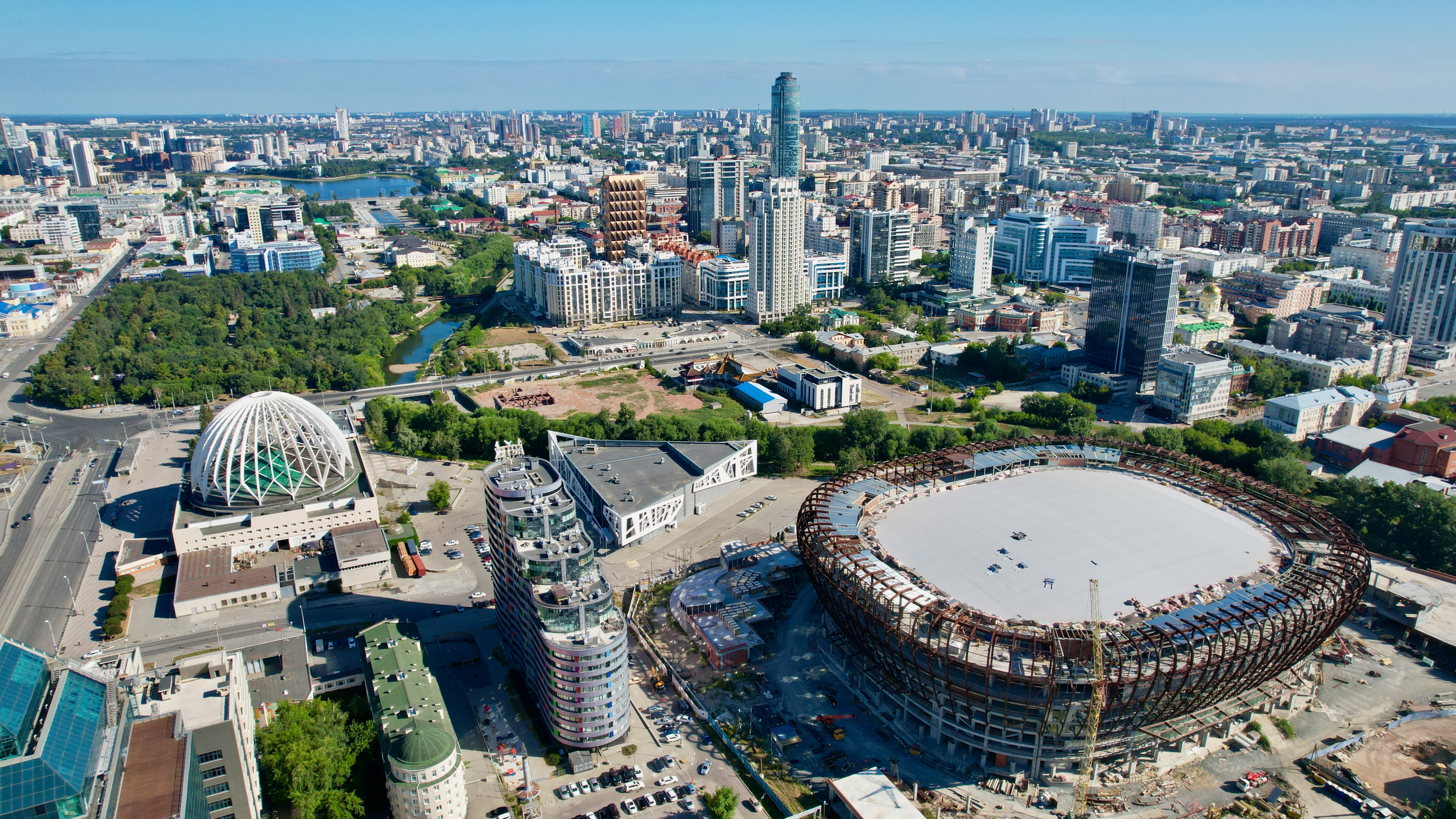
July 2022

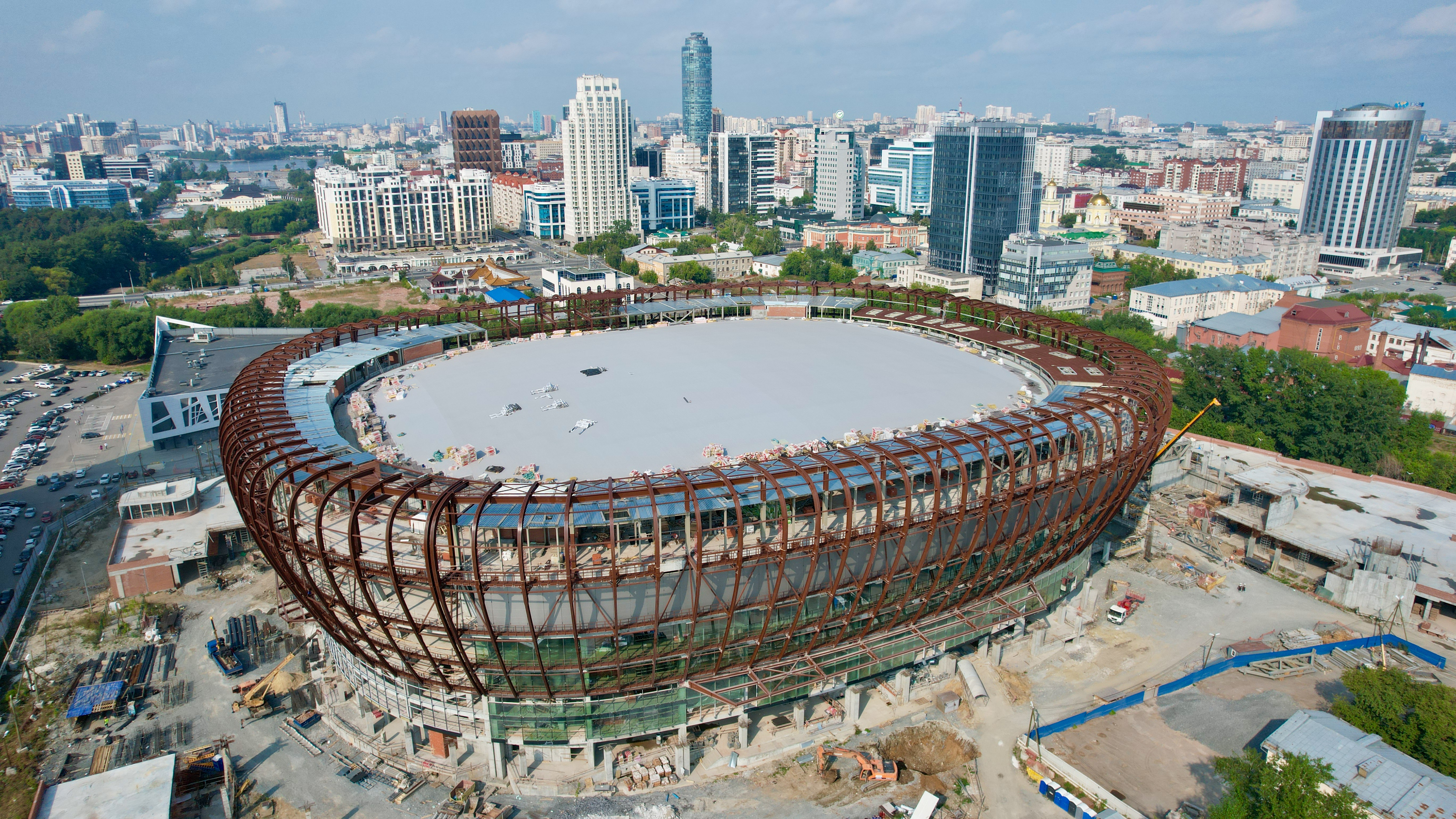
August 2022

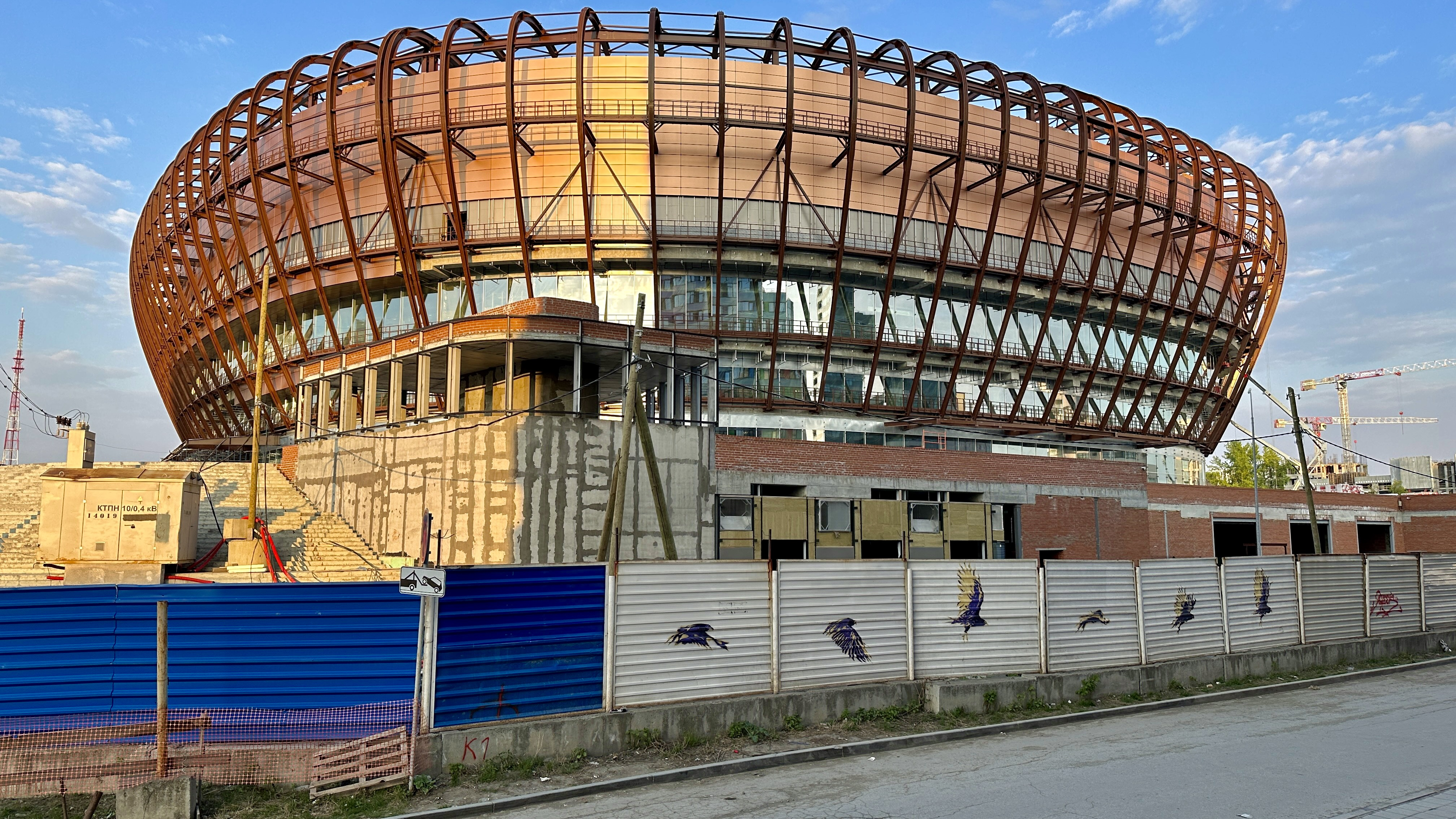
May 2023

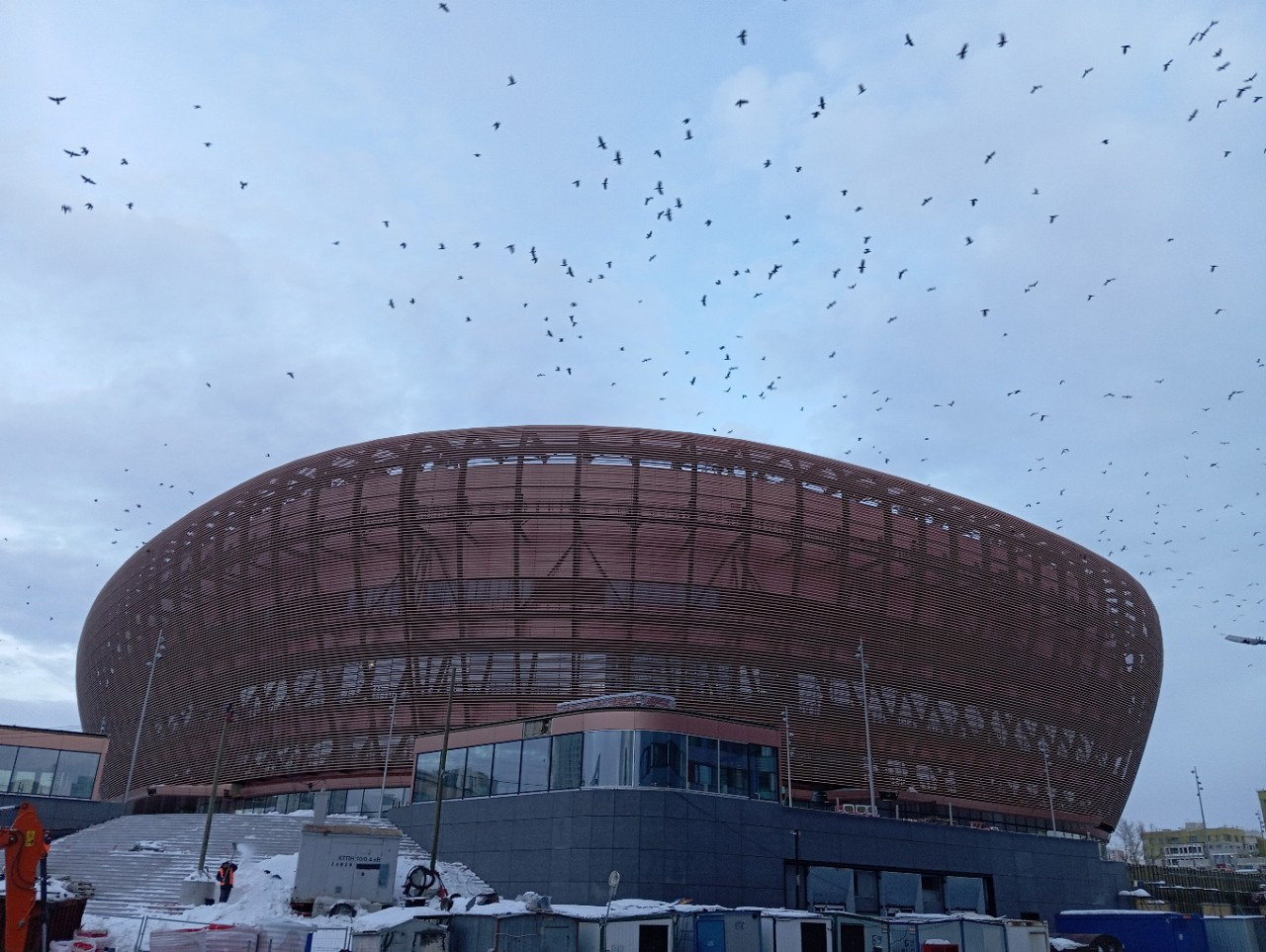
February 2024

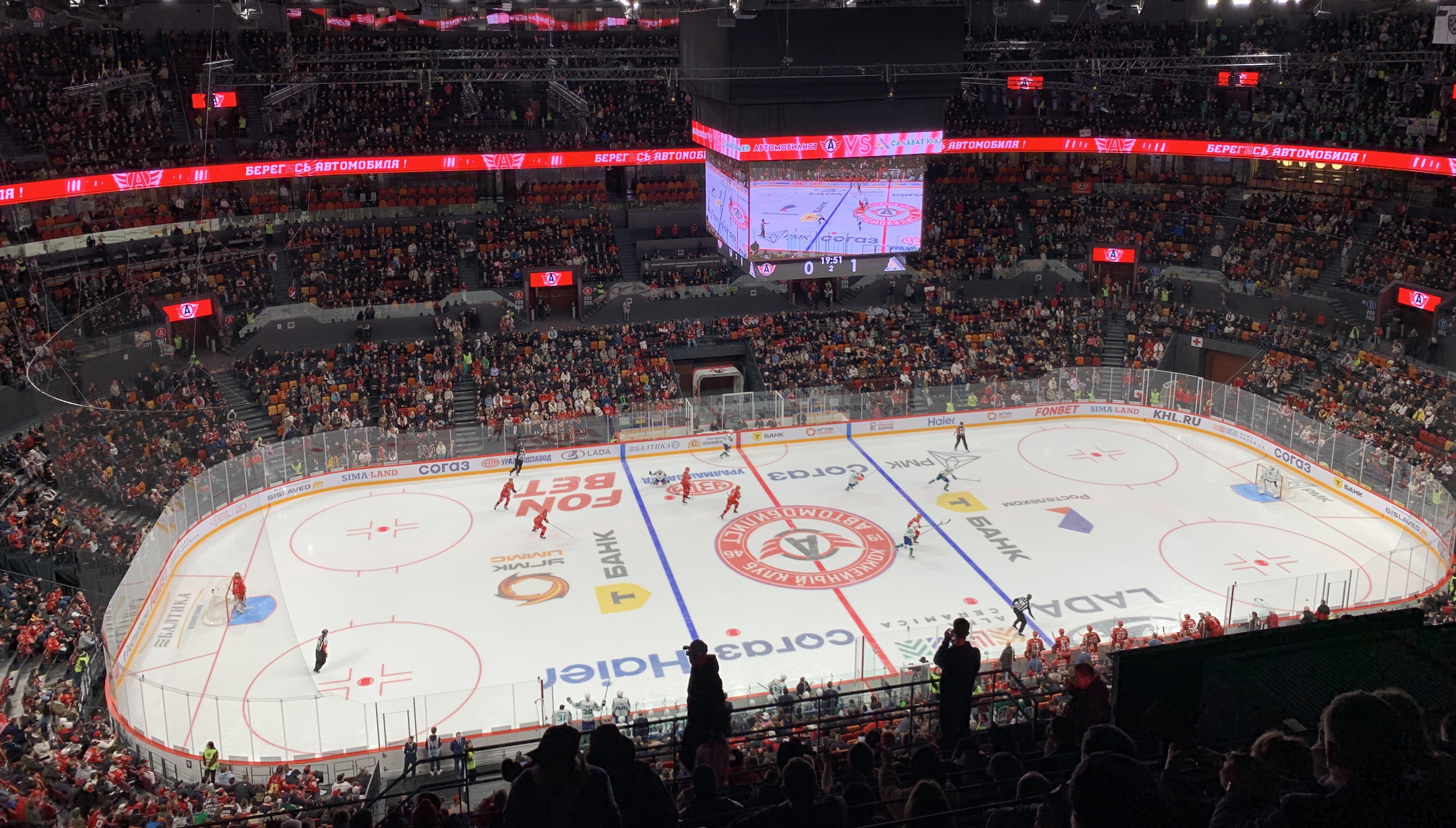
KHL match between Avtomobilist and Salavat Yulaev on March 15, 2025

KHL match between Avtomobilist and Amur on September 28, 2026

== See also ==
- List of indoor arenas in Russia
- List of European ice hockey arenas
- List of Kontinental Hockey League arenas
