= Sergey Kovalev =

Russian boxer (born 1983)

Sergey Kovalev Сергей Ковалёв
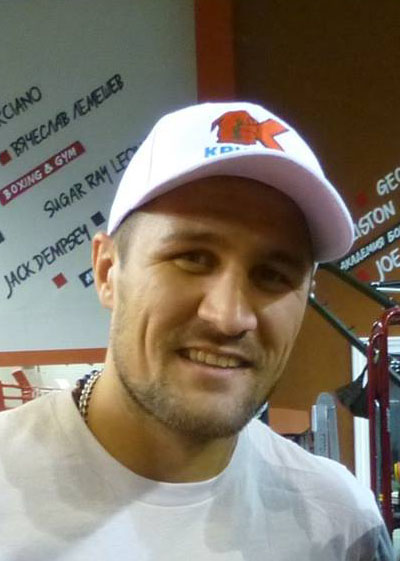
- Kovalev in 2014

Personal information
- Nickname: Krusher
- Nationality: Russian
- Born: Sergey Alexandrovich Kovalev; 2 April 1983 (age 43) Kopeysk, Russian SFSR, USSR
- Height: 6 ft 0 in (183 cm)
- Weight: Light heavyweight; Cruiserweight

Boxing career
- Reach: 72 1/2 in (184 cm)
- Stance: Orthodox

Boxing record
- Total fights: 42
- Wins: 36
- Win by KO: 30
- Losses: 5
- Draws: 1
Medal record
Men's Amateur boxing
Representing Russia
World Military Championships
Gold medal – first place	2005 Pretoria	Light heavyweight
Silver medal – second place	2006 Warendorf	Light heavyweight
Gold medal – first place	2007 Hyderabad	Light heavyweight

Sergey Alexandrovich Kovalev (Kovalyov) (Russian: Сергей Александрович Ковалёв; born 2 April 1983) is a Russian former professional boxer who competed from 2009 to 2025. He held multiple light-heavyweight world championships, including the WBA (Undisputed) and IBF titles from 2014 to 2016, and the WBO title three times between 2013 and 2019. Nicknamed the "Krusher", Kovalev is particularly known for his exceptional punching power, although he describes himself as "just a regular boxer".

In November 2019, Kovalev was ranked as the world's second-best light-heavyweight by The Ring magazine, third by BoxRec, and fourth by the Transnational Boxing Rankings Board. In 2014, The Ring named him its Fighter of the Year.

== Early life ==
Kovalev was initially interested in ice hockey, but stopped playing after his equipment was stolen from a dressing room. Because his parents could not afford to purchase replacement equipment, he tried other sports. Several months after he stopped playing hockey, he began to practice both boxing and amateur wrestling.

== Amateur career ==
Kovalev started boxing in 1994 at the age of 11 and made his amateur debut in the 1997 Russian Boxing Junior Championship, where he won a gold medal in the middleweight juniors division. One year later, he competed with the seniors and reached the finals, and won the final fight the year after. He competed in the European Championships for the Russian team.

In 2004, Kovalev participated in the Russian Senior Championship for the first time, reached the finals, and won the gold medal in the team event. In 2005, he reached the peak of his amateur career and won two championships: the first as a champion of Russia and the second as a champion among servicemen. He won the silver medal in the championship for servicemen in 2006. In 2007, he finished third in both the Russian Championship and World Military Games in India.

In 2008, Kovalev participated in his final amateur competition and reached the finals, after which he decided to turn professional. Kovalev admitted that he felt forced to leave the national team because of the intense competition between him and others boxers such as Artur Beterbiev (to whom he lost 24–25). Kovalev finished his amateur career with a record of 195–18.

=== Highlights ===
- 2000 Russian Junior Championships silver medalist at light-welterweight
- 2001 Russian Junior Championships silver medalist at middleweight
- 2004 Russian Championships silver medalist at middleweight, losing to Matt Korobov
- 2005 Russian Championships gold medalist at middleweight
- 2005 World Military Championships gold medalist at light-heavyweight, in Pretoria, South Africa
- 2006 World Military Championships silver medalist at light-heavyweight, in Warendorf, Germany
- 2007 World Military Championships gold medalist at light-heavyweight, in Hyderabad, India
- 2007 Russian Championships bronze medalist at light-heavyweight, losing to Artur Beterbiev
- 2008 Russian Championships silver medalist at light-heavyweight.

== Professional career ==
=== Early career ===
Kovalev started his career with a first-round KO of Daniel Chavez at Greensboro Coliseum in Greensboro, North Carolina.

In July 2011, Kovalev won his first North American Boxing Association belt in a 10-round fight with Douglas Otieno from Kenya. His next bout against Grover Young was controversial: during the second round, Kovalev threw a left hook that the referee declared an illegal blow to the back of the head. Due to Young's inability to continue, the fight was declared a technical draw.

In his 2011 fight against Roman Simakov of Russia, Kovalev knocked down his opponent in the sixth round. The fight was stopped and Kovalev was awarded a TKO victory. Simakov was taken to the hospital, where he lapsed into a coma and died three days later.

In 2012, John David Jackson became Kovalev's trainer. Kovalev met Darnell Boone in the ring for the second time and knocked him out in the second round; the win led him to be signed on to Main Events boxing.

On 19 January 2013, Kovalev faced the former World Boxing Association (WBA) light-heavyweight champion Gabriel Campillo. Kovalev took advantage of Campillo's faltering defense and knocked him down with a left hook, one of three knockdowns in the round.

=== WBO light-heavyweight champion ===
==== Kovalev vs. Cleverly ====
On 17 August 2013, Kovalev fought Nathan Cleverly for the World Boxing Organization (WBO) light-heavyweight title. Kovalev, who knocked most of his opponents out within three rounds, threw heavy shots in the first round, and hurt Cleverly badly in the third round, dropping him twice. Kovalev knocked Cleverly down a third time in the fourth round until the referee intervened; it was the first time Cleverly had been knocked down as a professional.

==== Title defenses ====
On 30 November 2013, Kovalev had his first defense of the WBO light-heavyweight title against #15 Ismayl Sillakh (21–1, 17 KO's). In round two, Kovalev dropped Sillakh, and when Sillakh could not regain his footing, Kovalev floored him a second time and ended the fight. The fight averaged 1.25 million viewers on HBO.

On 29 March 2014, Kovalev defended his title against undefeated Cedric Agnew (26–0, 13 KOs) at the Adrian Phillips Ballroom at Boardwalk Hall in Atlantic City. Although Agnew was not known to many boxing fans at the time, he won against Yusaf Mack, Daniel Judah, and Otis Griffin. Agnew's movement gave Kovalev difficulty at times, but after three falls, Agnew was finished in the seventh round. The fight drew an average of 1.048 million viewers on HBO. Although the figures were down from the Kovalev vs. Sillakh bout, the fight was televised at the same time as Wisconsin vs. Arizona, competing to reach the Final Four of the NCAA's college basketball tournament.

On 2 August 2014, Kovalev defended his WBO title against undefeated Australian contender Blake Caparello (19–0–1, 6 KOs) at the Revel Casino Hotel in Atlantic City, New Jersey, and it was televised on Boxing After Dark. Kovalev hoped for a unification fight against WBC champion Adonis Stevenson, but Stevenson stated he would only fight on Showtime; as Kovalev was contracted to HBO, he had to fight Caparello instead. Caparello scored a flash knockdown after catching Kovalev with a solid shot while Kovalev was off balance. Kovalev, however, was unhurt and even appeared enraged, and beat Caparello in a second-round technical knockout. The fight was watched by an average of 990,000 viewers and peaked at 1.052 million. Kovalev's victory allowed him to fight Bernard Hopkins in the fall of 2014. Main Events spokesperson Kathy Duva believed there was a loss of focus due to building pressure, which was why Kovalev was dropped by Caparello. Kovalev shrugged off any claims that he felt pressure, saying, "I didn't think about Bernard Hopkins tonight. I was focused on this fight. It is very important. A big step for me. If I do not win the fight, there is no fight with Bernard Hopkins." Lou DiBella, a promoter of Caparello, praised Kovalev, particularly the body shot that ended the fight. Negotiations for the Hopkins fight began prior to the Caparello fight.

=== Unified light-heavyweight champion ===
==== Kovalev vs. Hopkins ====
On 8 November 2014, Kovalev and Hopkins (55–6–2, 32 KOs) fought in a unification bout at the Boardwalk Hall. The fight was televised on HBO World Championship Boxing. Kovalev defeated Hopkins by unanimous decision to retain the WBO light-heavyweight title, and win the WBA (Super) and IBF titles. In a one-sided fight, Kovalev knocked Hopkins down in the first round, and won every single round on all of the three judges' scorecards. The score totals of the fight were 120–107, 120–107, and 120–106. In round 12, Kovalev landed 38 punches on Hopkins, the most any boxer had ever landed on him in a single round in his 41 fights recorded by CompuBox. Hopkins earned $1 million whilst Kovalev earned $500,000. Kovalev said after the fight, "I'm very happy. This victory was for my son Aleksandr." The fight was considered successful, as it was watched by an average of 1.328 million viewers.

==== Kovalev vs. Pascal ====
On 14 March 2015, Kovalev defended his world titles and fought Jean Pascal (29–2–1, 17 KOs) for the WBC Diamond light-heavyweight title at the Bell Centre in Montreal live on HBO. Kovalev had just been named Sports Illustrated's 2014 Fighter of the Year. In the eighth round, the referee stopped the fight as he felt Pascal was badly injured. However, Pascal felt the interruption was unfair and demanded a rematch; at the time, Kovalev led 68–64 on all three judges' scorecards. The fight averaged 1.152 million viewers on HBO.

==== Kovalev vs. Mohammedi ====
On 25 July 2015, Kovalev fought French boxer Nadjib Mohammedi (37–3, 23 KOs) at the Mandalay Bay Resort & Casino in Las Vegas. Kovalev knocked Mohammedi down once in the second round and again in the third round. The second knockdown ended Mohammedi's night and gave Kovalev his 25th knockout victory. Kovalev said in the post-fight interview, "I wanted more rounds. I wanted him to look like a clown. I wanted him to look foolish. I'm very happy that I got the victory," Kovalev said. "I gave my best. I am happy. I told him to stand up. It was a short show. People didn't see boxing." Abel Sanchez, Mohammedi's trainer, believed his boxer was overwhelmed with being on the main event and feeling pressured. Kovalev earned $750,000 and Mohammedi earned a career-high $270,000. The fight was seen by just over 1 million viewers on HBO.

Duva stated that Kovalev was looking for a homecoming bout next, likely on 28 November in Moscow, and stated she would call promoter Yvon Michel to set up a fight with two-time Olympian Artur Beterbiev (9–0, 9 KOs), who defeated Kovalev in the amateurs. The fight was unlikely to happen as Beterbiev was advised by Al Haymon, and performed on Premier Boxing Champions, who were banned by HBO.

==== Kovalev vs. Pascal, Chilemba ====
Kovalev had a rematch with Pascal on 30 January 2016 at the Bell Centre in Montreal on HBO. Pascal was pumped for the rematch, stating it would turn out differently to the first fight: "I put him down in the eighth round in the first fight, but [the referee] called it a slip. But I promise you that Kovalev is going to have a full plate in the rematch. I'm going to have a full plate as well, but I have a new trainer [Freddie Roach]. I'm going to teach him respect and to respect Canadian boxing fans."

Kovalev dominated the fight, both outpunching and outlanding Pascal by wide margins. Kovalev won when Roach refused to let Pascal continue after the seventh round. During the pause, the scorecards read 70–62 three times in favor of Kovalev. Round 5 was scored 10–8 on all three judges' cards without a knockdown. After the round, Roach threatened to pull Pascal. According to CompuBox stats, Kovalev landed 165 of 412 punches (40%) and Pascal landed 30 of 108 blows (28%).

After the fight, Kovalev said his future plans would likely include a fight with former super middleweight champion Andre Ward, but he first wanted a unification bout with reigning WBC and recognized Adonis Stevenson, a lineal champion. Kovalev called Stevenson "Adonis Chickenson" during the post-fight interview. Stevenson, who was in attendance, responded by confronting Kovalev in the ring surrounded by three bodyguards. The fight averaged 1.179 million viewers on HBO and peaked at 1.269 million viewers.

Kovalev had a warm-up fight on 11 July against Isaac Chilemba (24–3–2, 10 KOs) in Ekaterinburg, Russia, at the Palace of Sports; it was the first time in five years that Kovalev returned to Russia for a fight to defend his WBA (Super), IBF, and WBO light-heavyweight titles. Chilemba was known for having a similar style to Ward. Kovalev tipped the scales at 174.6lbs, while Chilemba weighed in at 174.8lbs. Kovalev earned a unanimous points decision after a hard-earned battle. The three judges at ringside scored the fight 117–110, 116–111, and 118–109 at the end of 12 rounds in favour of Kovalev, who retained his titles. In round 7, Chilemba staggered across the ropes and was downed by a straight left with a right to the jaw.

=== Consecutive defeats ===
==== Kovalev vs. Ward ====
On 16 June 2016, it was announced that a contract had been signed between Kovalev and Ward (30–0, 15 KOs), and that the match would take place at the T-Mobile Arena in Las Vegas on 19 November 2016. Both fighters remained undefeated through interim bouts.

Kovalev lost a closely contested controversial decision with all the judges scoring the fight 114–113 in favor of Ward. Larry Merchant stated after the fight, "It was a classic hometown decision, Kovalev won the fight!" Gareth Davies, boxing correspondent, gave the fight to Kovalev with 115–112, as did Max Kellerman. Duva, said, "We got a great fight, which is what boxing needed. But we also got a bad decision, which is not what boxing needed." Many boxing experts have applauded the decision: Paulie Malignaggi noted the high degree of difficulty both fighters faced that night and doubted the prospect of a one-sided affair in the case of a rematch, though he concluded that Kovalev faded late in the fight; promoter Eddie Hearn added that Kovalev lacked a sense of urgency after the halfway point; Gennady Golovkin's trainer, Abel Sanchez, noticed how Kovalev allowed Ward on the inside and as a result was worn down. For the fight, Kovalev received a minimum of $2 million and Ward a career-high $5 million. CompuBox stats showed that Kovalev landed 126 of 474 punches (27%), and Ward landed 116 out of 337 thrown (34%).

The fight was reported to have accomplished 160,000 buys on HBO PPV. A replay was shown on HBO prior to the Lomachenko-Walters title fight, which averaged 834,000 viewers. The event produced a live gate of $3.3 million from 10,066 tickets sold, including complimentary tickets, the full attendance was announced as 13,310. The venue was set up to hold 14,227.

==== Kovalev vs. Ward II ====
Kovalev's manager Egis Klimas announced that negotiations had begun for the rematch between Ward and Kovalev. According to the NSAC, The T-Mobile Arena was reserved for 17 June 2017 on HBO PPV. On 24 March 2017, Kovalev revealed on social media that he had signed his end of the deal. It was also noted that the rematch would take place at the Mandalay Bay in Paradise, Nevada, on HBO PPV. On 4 April, Roc Nation Sports and Main Events confirmed that terms were agreed for the rematch to take place on HBO PPV. The fight was billed as "No Excuses". The Las Vegas Sun confirmed the bout would take place at the Mandalay Bay Events Center. On 10 April, Duva said that there would be no rematch clause in place for a third fight, which meant the winner would not be obliged to fight another rematch. The fight purses were revealed before the fight with Ward taking a guaranteed $6.5 million and Kovalev, not having a base purse, receiving a percentage of PPV and gate revenue.

The fight ended in the eighth round with Ward's victory. At the end of the match, two judges had Ward ahead at 67–66, whilst the third judge had it 68–65 in favour of Kovalev. CompuBox stats showed that Ward landed 80 of 238 punches (34%) whilst Kovalev landed 95 of his 407 thrown (23%).

Ward commended Kovalev in the post-fight interview, "He's a good fighter, and I have nothing but respect for him. First time around, the man is world champion, and he's been on top a long time. I give him credit. He is a great fighter, and when you fight great fighters, you have to raise your game." Kovalev said the fight could have continued, "I don't know. I can't explain it. Not every round, but I thought I was doing very good. I was better, and he was better this fight. I didn't feel like I was getting knocked down with his punches --- I could have continued," Kovalev said. "I didn't feel the punch. This is fighting. We are boxers. Yes, he did punch me, but he didn't hurt me. The fight should have continued."

According to Yahoo Sports, the fight generated around 130,000 buys on HBO PPV. The replay was shown on regular HBO, which averaged 752,000 viewers and peaked at 947,000 during the final round. The event produced $2,187,340 from 6,366 tickets sold, including complimentary tickets. The number of attendees was announced to be 10,592.

Kovalev spoke to reporters in Russia on 27 June 2017, and confirmed that he would be making changes to his team, which included a new head trainer, meaning he would part ways with John David Jackson, and a new specialist. Due to having issues making the light-heavyweight limit, Kovalev considered moving up to cruiserweight. Reports also suggested that Ward's trainer, Virgil Hunter offered his services to Kovalev. On 26 October, Kovalev announced Abror Tursunpulatov as his new trainer. Tursunpulatov was most known for training and developing amateurs, such as the 2016 Rio Olympic Gold medalist Fazliddin Gaibnazarov.

=== Second reign as WBO light-heavyweight champion ===
==== Kovalev vs. Shabranskyy ====
On 25 November, Kovalev appeared on Boxing After Dark against light-heavyweight contender Vyacheslav Shabranskyy (19–1, 16 KOs) in a scheduled ten-round bout that took place at The Theater at Madison Square Garden in New York City. Kovalev spoke about his consecutive defeats, “I learned a lot from my fights with Andre Ward. When you don’t win and when you suffer adversity, it makes you stronger. It also shows you who your real friends are. I feel like I cleaned out my life and now I’m ready to start fresh. I’m very excited to get back in the ring and fight at Madison Square Garden for the first time, and I’m focused on the future. I’m not looking back.” Kovalev told Ringtv that he would not have a lead trainer for the fight. On 12 October, Main Events asked the WBO to sanction the fight for their vacant title, following Ward's retirement from boxing. At the time, Shabranskyy was not ranked by WBO in their top 15. On 26 October, WBO decided to sanction the fight, also meaning the fight would now be a 12-round bout. On 15 November, the International Boxing Association announced that they would be sanctioning the fight for their vacant light-heavyweight title. The IBA title was last held by Beibut Shumenov, until he lost to Hopkins in April 2014. Due to Hopkins not paying their sanctioning fees, the title remained vacant.

Kovalev regained the WBO title after stopping Shabranskyy in round two. Kovalev knocked Shabranskyy down three times during the fight before it was stopped. Speaking to Max Kellerman of HBO, Kovalev said, "I did it. I worked really hard. Mentally, physically, I'm back. It's my goal to be the best in the division. Last fight I was stopped, it was a decision by the referee. Here tonight was great boxing for me and I love boxing and I am here to make great fights." He also went on to say that he would like unification fights going forward. CompuBox showed that Kovalev landed 50 of 113 punches (44%), this included 25 of 36 power shots in round two and Shabranskyy landed 16 of 71 thrown (23%). According to Nielsen Media Research, the fight averaged 869,000 viewers and peaked at 900,000 viewers.

==== Kovalev vs. Mikhalkin ====
Immediately after defeating Shabranskyy, Kovalev stated that he would return to The Theater on 3 March 2018 in the hopes of joining a unification fight with belt holders Artur Beterbiev (IBF), Dmitry Bivol (WBA), and Stevenson (WBC). On 18 December, ESPN reported a deal was close to being made for Kovalev to defend his WBO title against IBO titleholder Igor Mikhalkin (21–1, 9 KOs), who was on a 10-fight win streak. The fight took place on 3 March 2018, at the Theater at Madison Square Garden on HBO. Initially, Mikhalkin was in talks with contender Marcus Browne for a final eliminator. Kovalev retained his world title and defeated Mikhalkin via TKO in round 7. After the fight, Kovalev said, “This was better work for me than my last fight. It may have looked easy but it was not easy tonight.” According to CompuBox, Kovalev landed 186 of 525 punches (35%) and Mikhalkin landed 43 of his 275 thrown (16%). The fight averaged 599,000 viewers and peaked at 674,000 viewers.

==== Kovalev vs. Eleider Álvarez ====
On 18 March, a deal was made for Kovalev to defend his WBO title against Browne at the Hulu Theater at Madison Square Garden on HBO. A date as early as 23 June was discussed but not finalized. On 6 April, Browne was arrested for domestic violence, and on 18 April, Kovalev announced he would instead fight long-time WBC mandatory Eleider Álvarez (23–0, 11 KOs) in the summer of 2018 instead. Michel, promoter for both Álvarez and Stevenson, was unable to come up with an agreement for a step aside fee for Álvarez to allow Stevenson to fight Badou Jack in May 2018; Álvarez's manager Stephane Lepine then contacted Main Events for a possible fight. On 4 August, the fight took place at the Hard Rock Hotel & Casino in Atlantic City, New Jersey.

The arena was a sell-out with a crowd of 5,642 in attendance. In a shocking upset, Álvarez won the fight via TKO in round 7 to claim the WBO title. Kovalev was knocked down three times in the seventh round before the fight was stopped. For the first six rounds, Kovalev fought well. He used his jab and landed right hands on the outside. Kovalev headed into round 7 ahead on the scorecards, 59–55, 59–55 and 58–56, but was caught and dropped hard by a one-two combination. He beat the count, but instead of trying to hold Álvarez in a clinch, he attempted to brawl, only to be dropped a further two times. Referee David Fields decided to stop the bout, with the time of stoppage at 2:45 of the round. Álvarez was detaining himself to the midway point of the fight before letting off some power shots. Álvarez explained that part of the game plan was to wait for Kovalev to tire.

After the fight, Duva confirmed there was a rematch clause in the contract, but was unsure if the rematch would take place straight away. Kovalev was hospitalized as a precaution. He thanked his fans for their support, and hinted at retirement. Through a translator, Álvarez said, "Words cannot describe how I feel. I want to thank God and all my fans in Canada and Colombia. This was all for them. It was a two-punch combination [for the final knockdown] that I have been throwing my whole career, and we worked on it in camp. I have always practiced that in camp, and we thought it would work in this camp." Kovalev was taken to hospital following the loss. He said in a video statement, "I feel OK. Thank you everyone. Thank you very much to all the fans around the world for your support. I love you, and I'm fine." Duva also noticed that Kovalev appeared to gas around the middle of the fight. According to CompuBox, through the seven rounds, Kovalev landed 91 of 339 punches thrown (27%) and Álvarez landed 73 of his 251 thrown (29%). Round 4 was the busiest of either boxer, where Kovalev landed 29 of 82 shots, 25 of which were power shots. The fight averaged 731,000 viewers on HBO, peaking at 813,000 viewers. An increase from Kovalev's last fight.

=== Third reign as WBO light-heavyweight champion ===
==== Kovalev vs. Eleider Álvarez II ====
On 25 August, Kovalev said he would exercise the rematch clause; according to the contract, the fight needed to occur by February 2019. Early talks indicated the rematch would take place in December 2018. A stumbling block appeared when HBO confirmed they were not fully committed to airing a rematch between the two fighters. Duva stated at any point competing networks could bid on the bout, but all HBO needed to do was match the highest bid to broadcast the fight. On 14 September, it was announced that ESPN would broadcast the rematch. The fight took place on 2 February 2019 at the Ford Center at The Star in Frisco, Texas. Kovalev worked with his new trainer Buddy McGirt for the bout, ending his three-fight run with Tursunpulatov.

Before a crowd of before 4,877, Kovalev fought the perfect fight and put on a performance to regain the WBO title after defeating Álvarez via unanimous decision after twelve rounds. Álvarez won some of earlier rounds, however once Kovalev settled into a rhythm and using his jab, he was able to keep Álvarez at range, which he continued to do so for the remainder of the fight. Kovalev had better conditioning in the rematch with the main difference being instead of going toe-to-toe, he focused more on boxing. He fought smart and avoided clinches. Álvarez did his best to try and slug it out, using holds and head-locks. It was the corner advice from Buddy McGirt which really helped Kovalev stay focused between rounds. Kovalev slowed down the pace in the middle rounds. He appeared tired, but got his second win in the championship rounds to finish the fight strong. The judges scored it 120–108, 116–112 and 116–112 for Kovalev. Following the fight, Kovalev said, “My goal was to box. He was looking for the big punch, but I kept boxing. The only time I got hurt was when I got a thumb in my eye.” Álvarez had no excuses, but felt if it came down to a decision, he would have lost. Álvarez did not feel like he lost the fight, but accepted the decision. According to CompuBox, Kovalev landed 213 of 816 punches thrown (26.1%) and Álvarez landed 111 of his 369 punches thrown (30%). Kovalev out-landed Álvarez in 11 out of the 12 rounds.

Álvarez's promoter Yvon Michel faulted the teams strategy going into the rematch feeling confident in stopping Kovalev, much like the first fight. Álvarez later admitted he was too focused on knocking out Kovalev. He said, "It was not my night, I admit that I tried to knock him out, that was my plan, but things did not work out. I wanted to end it before the twelfth round, but it didn't happen." He was scheduled to take a few days away from training but called for a trilogy fight. According to Kathy Duva, the rematch did not have the same feel as the first fight, thus not warranting a third fight.

==== Kovalev vs. Yarde ====
On 2 April 2019, the WBO ordered Kovalev to defend his world title against British challenger Anthony Yarde (18–0, 17 KOs). A 30-day negotiation period was given to both parties. A purse bid would be a 75–25 split in favour for Kovalev. On 2 April, a purse bid was scheduled only to be postponed to allow negotiations to continue. On 18 April, WBO president Paco Valcarcel stated terms were agreed for the fight to take place. Yarde reportedly signed his contract on 11 May, awaiting an announcement for the fight, scheduled in Russia. On 5 June, Yarde's promoter Frank Warren hit out at the organisers as the fight had yet to be announced. Kathy Duva said the organisers in Russia wanted to hold off the fight until August 2019. This was not being agreed by Yarde and his team and a solution was requested. The WBO then scheduled a new purse bid for 11 June, only to be postponed to 24 June after both teams again attempted to make their own deal.

On 12 July, after months of negotiations, the fight between Kovalev and Yarde was formally announced by the Russian Boxing Federation, to take place at Traktor Ice Arena in Kovalev's hometown of Chelyabinsk, Russia. Yarde told the press, “This is my time now and I am going to show the world what I am all about. I am more than happy to achieve my goal in Russia and I think it is only right that a great world champion such as Kovalev is given the opportunity to defend in his home country. He has earned that right." Frank Warren was confident in Yarde being victorious and stated the it was a key reason as to allowing the fight to take place in Russia.

On 25 July, it became known that Kovalev was negotiating a deal to fight Saul Álvarez in October 2019, in a fight that would see Álvarez make his light heavyweight debut. There was reports implying the fight with Yarde would be scrapped if Golden Boy Promotions and Main Events successfully negotiated a deal. Álvarez was ordered by the IBF to defend the title against Sergiy Derevyanchenko. John Skipper, who was DAZN's executive chairman, where Álvarez was tied into a contract, stated the steaming service would only approve Kovalev or a trilogy fight with Gennady Golovkin as Álvarez's next fight. According to Egis Klimas, an agreement was in place for Kovalev to fight Álvarez, if he was to defeat Yarde. On 8 August, Álvarez decided to wait until after Kovalev's fight with Yarde to decide his next opponent. Yarde revealed he was approached multiple times for step aside offers. He was first offered less than his purse for the Kovalev fight, then offered the same amount. Yarde joked that these offers needed to be more than double his purse for him to consider stepping aside. During fight week, Kovalev spoke to reporters to explain the reason why he turned down a last minute eight-figure offer from Álvarez was due to the Yarde fight only being three weeks away. Tickets were already on sale and being sold. Also the matter that Kovalev was defending his world title in front his own fans in his hometown, having fought the majority of his career in the United States. Speaking to Steve Bunce, Kovalev said he wanted five more fights and a chance to become undisputed champion. Yarde made it his mission to win the fight by knockout and ruin Kovalev's plans to fight Álvarez.

After 11 rounds, Kovalev knocked out Yarde, ending the fight via TKO and retaining his WBO and ESP light-heavyweight titles. Yarde seemed comfortable in the early rounds, staying out of range and keeping Kovalev at bay with speed and movement. After six rounds of an even, back and forth contest, Yarde began landing hooks to Kovalev's body in the seventh and eighth rounds that appeared to hurt him. In the last minute of the eighth, Yarde landed a straight-right to the head of Kovalev which had him in trouble. Yarde followed up with a salvo of power punches but was unable to capitalise, allowing the visibly hurt Kovalev to stay on his feet for the remainder of the round. After this success, Yarde appeared tired and lose momentum, allowing Kovalev to take control of the fight with combination punches and stiff jabs that began to frequently land on Yarde. The tenth round saw much of the same. In the final 20 seconds of the ninth round. Yarde was seemingly saved by the bell, which appeared to ring 8 seconds before the end of the round. In round eleven, sensing Yarde's fatigue, Kovalev upped the pressure and increased his punch output, eventually dropping Yarde with a spearing left-jab to win the fight by knockout. At the time of the stoppage, all three judges had Kovalev ahead with the scorecards reading 98–92, 97–94 and 96–93.

According to CompuBox, Kovalev landed 223 of his 686 punches (32.5%) while Yarde landed 132 of his 575 punches (23%), the most punches any fighter has landed on Kovalev. After the fight, Kovalev praised Yarde for his toughness, saying that Yarde "will 100% percent become a world champion one day". Buddy McGirt was close to stopping the fight after eight rounds. Kovalev pleaded with him to allow the fight to continue as he believed Yarde was beginning to tire. McGirt believed Yarde only got more confidence in the fight as Kovalev became lazy. After the fight, McGirt approached Yarde's locker room and told him, “you surprised me.” Kovalev was now ready for his next challenge.

==== Kovalev vs. Canelo Álvarez ====
Less than three months after beating Yarde, Kovalev faced unified middleweight champion Canelo Álvarez on 2 November 2019, who made his debut in the light-heavyweight division. After a competitive first ten rounds in which Kovalev found success with his jab, Álvarez threw a left hook, straight right combination to stop Kovalev in the eleventh round.

After the fight, Kovalev suggested that he had always been unlikely to win the fight, due to the gruelling schedule of back-to-back training camps which resulted from the short period of time between the Yarde and Álvarez fights, but had agreed to fight the latter regardless due to the high financial incentive, which was reported to be $12 million (£9 million). Álvarez responded by calling Kovalev a "bad loser".

==== Cancelled fights vs. Barrera and Melikuziev ====
In December 2019, it was reported that Kovalev was offered a fight in Russia in 2020. There were talks of a showdown between Kovalev and light-heavyweight contender Sullivan Barrera (22–3, 14 KOs) to take place in April and May. Barrera had already signed his contract for the fight, which would be broadcast on DAZN. On 4 March, the fight was confirmed to take place at a catchweight of 180 pound over a 12 rounds. The Athletic's Mike Coppinger reported the card would take place at Fantasy Springs Casino in Indio, California under Golden Boy Promotions. This was due to Golden Boy owing Kovalev $2.5 million comeback fight, following his defeat to Canelo. During the promotion of the fight, Kovalev stated, “I am happy to get back in the ring and to be on my way back to world championship bouts. Barrera is a Cuban fighter and, even though I never faced any Cuban fighters as a professional, back in amateur days it was always Russian boxers competing with Cuban boxers, so I'm looking forward to remembering my amateur boxing.” Barrera said, “This will be the most important fight of my career because I have always pursued a fight with Sergey Kovalev.” Barrera was previously promoted by Kathy Duva's Main Events, which meant a fight between the two was always foreseen.

Not long after the fight was made official, the card was postponed, along with many other boxing events due to the coronavirus pandemic. At this time, Golden Boy were unable to offer a new date due to the uncertainty of the pandemic and how it would affect sports in the coming months. The fight with Kovalev was a proposed two-fight plan for Barrera. He anticipated a win over Kovalev would earn him a world title fight, for him to then retire from boxing. Barrera was still in the gym training and joked that he hoped Kovalev had not picked up a bottle. In November, it was reported the fight could be rescheduled to 30 January 2021.

On 16 December, it was announced that Kovalev would return to the ring on 30 January, however instead of fighting Barrera, he would return to Moscow at the Luzhniki Arena against 24 year old Uzbek prospect Bektemir Melikuziev (6–0, 5 KOs) on DAZN. Melikuziev previously fought at super middleweight. The fight was set for a contractual weight of 178 pounds. On the fight taking pace in his home country, Kovalev said, “I am glad that after a long break I am starting my journey back to the title of world champion. The fact that this fight is scheduled to be in Russia gives me even more motivation and strength.” Melikuziez showed respect towards Kovalev, calling him 'one of the biggest boxing stars of the last decade'. With only two weeks until fight night, the card was moved to Fantasy Springs Casino in Indio, California, without any fans in attendance. According to one source, the move was done due to health and safety concerns, which meant everyone involved would not have to travel. It was also reported the card would take place in the afternoon on the West Coast, so it would be broadcast during prime time in Russia.

On 14 January, Kovalev tested positive for synthetic testosterone, putting the fight in jeopardy. The test showed external testosterone and metabolites. Melikuziev put out a tweet stating, "It makes no difference to me. Just put him in the ring, let us fight regardless." All camps were notified by VADA on 13 January. The fight was officially cancelled a day later. Kathy Duva released a statement saying Kovalev has always proven to be a clean fighter and will continue to prove this. The test which came back positive was administered on 30 December 2024. A week later, it was reported that a second test which was conducted on 7 January 2021, also came back as a positive test for synthetic testosterone.

=== Cruiserweight ===
In January 2022, Kovalev was rumoured to make his cruiserweight debut on Triller Fight Club against former light heavyweight contender Meng Fanlong (17–0, 10 KOs), with the event taking place on 12 March. It was scheduled to be the headline for the card. Fanlong was coming off a unanimous decision win over Israel Duffus in October 2021. Kovalev revealed his plans to challenge for a cruiserweight world title within three to four fights and to then retire from boxing. The agreement with Golden Boy Promotions to promote his next bout had now gone to arbitration according to Egis Klimas. He did not confirm whether the failed drugs test voided the agreement. On 4 March, it was reported the card would take place at the Banc of California Stadium in Los Angeles with a new date of 14 May. Four days later, Fanlong pulled out of the fight, claiming that Triller was dragging its feet and opted to fight former world champion Jean Pascal instead. Kovalev was still slated to headline the Triller PPV, however now against Tervel Pulev (16–0, 13 KOs), brother of heavyweight contender Kubrat, who was also scheduled to appear on the card. The card, titled 'Trillerverz 5, Lineage of Greatness’ was officially announced to take place at the Forum. Kovalev planned to weigh below the cruiserweight limit. During fight week, he admitted he had concerns over his long lay-off.

==== Kovalev vs. Pulev ====
After a 31-month lay off, Kovalev outworked Pulev over the 10-round distance, winning via unanimous decision with the scores of 98–92, 98–92 and 97–93 to give Pulev his first professional defeat. Kovalev used his hard jab to control the majority of the action. This began to frustrate Pulev. Kovalev started landing hard combinations during the middle rounds. Pulev tried his best to counter. His trainer Buddy McGirt insisted that he stick to the gameplan of jab and keeping a distance, which was key towards the victory. After the fight, Kovalev spoke about the ring rust and wanting to keep busy. He said, “I’m just going to keep in shape after this fight, we’ll rest one week and then get back in the gym. I worried how it was going to be in the fight, of course there was some ring rust. Without boxing at a high level for over a year — my body doesn’t like this. I want to fight every three or four months.” Kovalev preferred one more fight at this level before moving on to world level again.

On 1 June, it was reported that Triller had not paid Kovalev and both Pulev brothers for the event. Jerry Forrest, who lost a decision to Kubrat Pulev, had received a partial payment. Triller Fight Club president David Tetreault told all parties involved the purse payments would be postponed up to 75 days, until they settled with a deadline of 31 May 2022. According to the contracts, Kovalev was guaranteed a minimum $500,000 purse.

On 31 January 2023, the WBC ordered a semi-final eliminator between Kovalev and South African former two-time world title challenger Thabiso Mchunu (23–6, 13 KOs), with a deadline set for 24 February. Mchunu was on a 4-fight win streak since his disputed split decision loss to world champion Ilunga Makabu.

==== Kovalev vs. Safar ====
The fight failed to materialise and Kovalev sat out the remainder of 2023 without a fight. On 11 January 2024, it was reported that Kovalev would make another long-awaited ring return against Swedish boxer Robin Safar (16–0, 12 KOs), who was fighting out of Las Vegas, on the Fury vs. Usyk undercard on 17 February in Riyadh, Saudi Arabia. After an injury occurred elsewhere, the whole card was moved to 18 May 2024.

Safar out-worked and broke down Kovalev throughout the fight, eventually dropping him in the tenth and final round, on his way to a unanimous decision win. The three judges scored the bout 97–92, 99–90 and 95–94 in favour of Safar. Kovalev started the fight with his trademark jab, whilst Safar aimed for the body. Kovalev stumbled after being hit on the chin in round 3. During the middle to late rounds, Safar was out-landing Kovalev. In the final round, Safar landed a left-right combination to Kovalev's chin, dropping him for an 8-count.

=== Retirement fight ===
It was announced on 6 March 2025, that Kovalev would take part in a retirement fight in his home city of Chelyabinsk, Russia against German boxer Artur Mann (22–4,13 KOs). The bout was scheduled for 19 April, in a 10-round bout. Mann was coming off a knockout win over Ion Mihai Desrobitu in November 2024, having previously lost to top contenders Kevin Lerena and Mairis Briedis in his career. Kovalev explained how the fight with Mann was made. He said, “I know nothing about him, but I was given the choice of five or six opponents and I chose him. He has the most technique [of the opponents he could have selected]; he’s the most dangerous and the best boxer. Other guys were very amateur-like.” He also stated his reason to retire was mainly due to inactivity, having only fought twice since his 2019 stoppage loss to Canelo Álvarez. Had Kovalev been more active during this time, he was more open to continuing his career. Kovalev was not in favour of having big gaps between fights. During fight week, Kovalev was asked what he would do in retirement. He replied, “What am I going to do? I don’t know. I’m going to be busy with my kids [his son is 10, his daughter is six]. Have fun, you know, like, enjoy my life.” He reiterated his stance on his retirement. The fight was streamed live for free on YouTube and Facebook, from Boxing News.

Kovalev finished his 16-year career at the Yunost Arena, with a seventh-round TKO win over Mann. In the second round, Mann was dropped from a short left. He beat the count, but was visibly hurt and got through a barrage of heavy punches. He was dropped again at the end of the round, but this was ruled a slip. Mann did well in the third and fourth rounds, tagging Kovalev with short punches, but at the same time on the receiving end of stiff jabs from Kovalev, which opened up a cut over his right eye. The ending came after Kovalev landed a left, right left combination, dropping Mann. He beat the count, but seeing he was unsteady legs, his corner stopped the fight. The official time of stoppage was 0:49 of round seven. The knockout was the 30th in his career and his record improved to 36 wins, 5 losses and 1 draw.

== Professional boxing record ==
42 fights	36 wins	5 losses
By knockout	30	3
By decision	6	2
Draws	1	

No.	Result	Record	Opponent	Type	Round, time	Date	Location	Notes
42	Win	36–5–1	Artur Mann	TKO	7 (10)	18 Apr 2025	Yunost Arena, Chelyabinsk, Russia	Won vacant IBA Pro Intercontinental cruiserweight title
41	Loss	35–5–1	Robin Sirwan Safar	UD	10	18 May 2024	Kingdom Arena, Riyadh, Saudi Arabia	
40	Win	35–4–1	Tervel Pulev	UD	10	14 May 2022	Kia Forum, Inglewood, California, US	
39	Loss	34–4–1	Canelo Álvarez	KO	11 (12), 2:15	2 Nov 2019	MGM Grand Garden Arena, Paradise, Nevada, US	Lost WBO light-heavyweight title
38	Win	34–3–1	Anthony Yarde	TKO	11 (12), 2:04	24 Aug 2019	Traktor Ice Arena, Chelyabinsk, Russia	Retained WBO light-heavyweight title
37	Win	33–3–1	Eleider Álvarez	UD	12	2 Feb 2019	Ford Center at The Star, Frisco, Texas, US	Won WBO light-heavyweight title
36	Loss	32–3–1	Eleider Álvarez	TKO	7 (12), 2:45	4 Aug 2018	Etess Arena, Atlantic City, New Jersey, US	Lost WBO and IBA light-heavyweight titles
35	Win	32–2–1	Igor Mikhalkin	TKO	7 (12), 2:25	3 Mar 2018	MSG Theater, New York City, New York, US	Retained WBO and EBP (Super) light-heavyweight titles
34	Win	31–2–1	Vyacheslav Shabranskyy	TKO	2 (12), 2:36	25 Nov 2017	MSG Theater, New York City, New York, US	Won vacant WBO, IBA, and inaugural EBP (Super) light-heavyweight titles
33	Loss	30–2–1	Andre Ward	TKO	8 (12), 2:29	17 Jun 2017	Mandalay Bay Events Center, Paradise, Nevada, US	For WBA (Unified), IBF, WBO, and vacant The Ring light-heavyweight titles
32	Loss	30–1–1	Andre Ward	UD	12	19 Nov 2016	T-Mobile Arena, Paradise, Nevada, US	Lost WBA (Unified), IBF, and WBO light-heavyweight titles
31	Win	30–0–1	Isaac Chilemba	UD	12	11 Jul 2016	Palace of Sporting Games, Yekaterinburg, Russia	Retained WBA (Unified), IBF, and WBO light-heavyweight titles
30	Win	29–0–1	Jean Pascal	RTD	7 (12), 3:00	30 Jan 2016	Bell Centre, Montreal, Quebec, Canada	Retained WBA (Unified), IBF, and WBO light-heavyweight titles
29	Win	28–0–1	Nadjib Mohammedi	KO	3 (12), 2:38	25 Jul 2015	Mandalay Bay Events Center, Paradise, Nevada, US	Retained WBA (Unified), IBF, and WBO light-heavyweight titles
28	Win	27–0–1	Jean Pascal	TKO	8 (12), 1:03	14 Mar 2015	Bell Centre, Montreal, Quebec, Canada	Retained WBA (Super), IBF, and WBO light-heavyweight titles
27	Win	26–0–1	Bernard Hopkins	UD	12	8 Nov 2014	Boardwalk Hall, Atlantic City, New Jersey, US	Retained WBO light-heavyweight title; Won WBA (Super) and IBF light-heavyweight titles
26	Win	25–0–1	Blake Caparello	TKO	2 (12), 1:34	2 Aug 2014	Revel Casino Hotel, Atlantic City, New Jersey, US	Retained WBO light-heavyweight title
25	Win	24–0–1	Cedric Agnew	KO	7 (12), 0:58	29 Mar 2014	Boardwalk Hall, Atlantic City, New Jersey, US	Retained WBO light-heavyweight title
24	Win	23–0–1	Ismail Sillakh	KO	2 (12), 2:12	30 Nov 2013	Colisée Pepsi, Quebec City, Quebec, Canada	Retained WBO light-heavyweight title
23	Win	22–0–1	Nathan Cleverly	TKO	4 (12), 0:29	17 Aug 2013	Motorpoint Arena, Cardiff, Wales	Won WBO light-heavyweight title
22	Win	21–0–1	Cornelius White	TKO	3 (12), 1:45	14 Jun 2013	Sands Casino Resort, Bethlehem, Pennsylvania, US	
21	Win	20–0–1	Gabriel Campillo	KO	3 (10), 1:30	19 Jan 2013	Mohegan Sun Arena, Montville, Connecticut, US	
20	Win	19–0–1	Lionell Thompson	TKO	3 (10), 0:14	21 Sep 2012	Sands Casino Resort, Bethlehem, Pennsylvania, US	
19	Win	18–0–1	Darnell Boone	TKO	2 (8), 1:32	1 Jun 2012	Sands Casino Resort, Bethlehem, Pennsylvania, US	
18	Win	17–0–1	Roman Simakov	TKO	7 (12), 0:47	5 Dec 2011	Palace of Sporting Games, Yekaterinburg, Russia	Won WBC–ABCO light heavyweight title; Simakov died of injuries sustained from the fight
17	Draw	16–0–1	Grover Young	TD	2 (8), 0:08	27 Aug 2011	Playboy Mansion, Beverly Hills, California, US	TD after Young could not continue from accidental foul
16	Win	16–0	Douglas Otieno Okola	KO	2 (10), 2:39	29 Jul 2011	Cosmopolitan of Las Vegas, Paradise, Nevada, US	Won vacant WBA–NABA USA light-heavyweight title
15	Win	15–0	Terrance Woods	KO	3 (8), 1:54	6 May 2011	Fantasy Springs Resort Casino, Indio, California, US	
14	Win	14–0	Julius Fogle	KO	2 (8), 1:16	1 Apr 2011	UIC Pavilion, Chicago, Illinois, US	
13	Win	13–0	William Johnson	TKO	2 (6), 1:53	12 Mar 2011	Hilton Towers Ballroom, Lafayette, Louisiana, US	
12	Win	12–0	Karen Avetisyan	UD	6	15 Dec 2010	Casino Vodoley, Yekaterinburg, Russia	
11	Win	11–0	Dallas Vargas	TKO	2 (8), 1:16	19 Nov 2010	UIC Pavilion, Chicago, Illinois, US	
10	Win	10–0	Darnell Boone	SD	8	9 Oct 2010	Metro Fitness, Atlanta, Georgia, US	
9	Win	9–0	Kia Daniels	KO	1 (6), 1:58	11 Sep 2010	Playboy Mansion, Beverly Hills, California, US	
8	Win	8–0	Harley Kilfian	TKO	2 (6), 1:24	19 Jun 2010	Emerald Queen Casino, Tacoma, Washington, US	
7	Win	7–0	Nathan Bedwell	TKO	1 (4), 2:15	19 Mar 2010	Derby Park Expo, Louisville, Kentucky, US	
6	Win	6–0	Francois Ambang	KO	2 (6), 2:23	6 Mar 2010	Patriot Center, Fairfax, Virginia, US	
5	Win	5–0	Micky Stackhouse	TKO	2 (4), 1:07	10 Oct 2009	Coliseum Complex, Greensboro, North Carolina, US	
4	Win	4–0	Ayodeji Fadeyi	RTD	1 (4), 3:00	12 Sep 2009	Playboy Mansion, Beverly Hills, California, US	
3	Win	3–0	Michael Birthmark	RTD	1 (4), 3:00	29 Aug 2009	Emerald Queen Casino, Tacoma, Washington, US	
2	Win	2–0	Darryl Johnson	TKO	1 (4), 2:06	8 Aug 2009	Convention Center, Columbia, South Carolina, US	
1	Win	1–0	Daniel Chavez	TKO	1 (4), 0:55	25 Jul 2009	Greensboro Coliseum, Greensboro, North Carolina, US	

== Titles in boxing ==
=== Major world titles ===
- WBA (Undisputed and Super) light heavyweight champion (Note: Primary champion throughout his reign.) (175 lbs)
- IBF light heavyweight champion (175 lbs)
- WBO light heavyweight champion (175 lbs) (3×)

=== Minor world titles ===
- IBA light heavyweight champion (175 lbs)

=== Regional/International titles ===
- NABA light heavyweight champion (175 lbs)
- ABCO light heavyweight champion (175 lbs)
- EBP (Super) light heavyweight champion (Note: Inaugural champion.) (175 lbs)

=== Honorary titles ===
- WBC Diamond light heavyweight champion
- WBO Super Champion

== Pay-per-view bouts ==
United States
No.	Date	Fight	Billing	Buys	Network
1	November 19, 2016	Kovalev vs. Ward	Pound for Pound	160,000	HBO
2	June 17, 2017	Ward vs. Kovalev II	The Rematch	125,000	HBO
		Total sales		285,000	

== Felony assault charge ==
On June 9, 2018, Kovalev was arrested in California for punching a woman in the face; the woman suffered a broken nose, a concussion, and a displaced disc in her neck. He was charged with assault likely to cause great bodily injury, which is a felony; he pleaded not guilty on 27 August 2018, and he was released on $50,000 bail. On 4 April 2019, Kovalev was held to answer for felony assault causing great bodily injury; the Court found that there was enough evidence to proceed to trial on the felony charge. Kovalev was arraigned on 19 April 2019, and was also sued by the victim in San Bernardino County Superior Court.

In January 2020, the accuser filed a new lawsuit against Kovalev in federal court in Los Angeles, alleging that the parties reached a $650,000 settlement in October 2019, but that Kovalev then breached the agreement by not making the agreed-upon payments. Because the original suit was not to be dismissed until Kovalev paid the entire $650,000, that suit also remained active. The victim voluntarily dismissed the breach of contract lawsuit in September 2020, but the original assault lawsuit remained pending and was set for trial beginning in January 2021.

On October 2, 2020, three days before his felony assault trial was scheduled to begin, Kovalev pleaded guilty to a misdemeanor charge of fighting/noise/offensive words and was sentenced to three years of probation and two days of time served. He was also required to complete an anger management course and pay court costs. A few weeks later, Kovalev's accuser filed to dismiss her assault lawsuit.

== See also ==
- List of world light-heavyweight boxing champions

== Notes and references ==
=== References ===
Sporting positions
Regional boxing titles
Vacant Title last held by Byron Mitchell	NABA USA light-heavyweight champion 29 July 2011 – December 2011; Vacated	Vacant Title next held by Anatoliy Dudchenko
Preceded by Roman Simakov	WBC–ABCO light-heavyweight champion 5 December 2011 – July 2013; Vacated	Vacant Title next held by Robert Berridge
Minor world boxing titles
Vacant Title last held by Beibut Shumenov	IBA light-heavyweight champion 25 November 2017 – 4 August 2018	Succeeded by Eleider Álvarez
Inaugural champion	EBP light-heavyweight champion 25 November 2017 – September 2018; Vacated	Vacant Title next held by Umar Salamov
Major world boxing titles
Preceded by Nathan Cleverly	WBO light-heavyweight champion 17 August 2013 – 19 November 2016	Succeeded by Andre Ward
Preceded by Bernard Hopkins	WBA light-heavyweight champion Undisputed title 8 November 2014 – 19 November 2016; Super title until March 2015	Succeeded by Andre Ward
Preceded by Bernard Hopkins	IBF light-heavyweight champion 8 November 2014 – 19 November 2016	Succeeded by Andre Ward
Vacant Title last held by Andre Ward	WBO light-heavyweight champion 25 November 2017 – 4 August 2018	Succeeded by Eleider Álvarez
Preceded by Eleider Álvarez	WBO light-heavyweight champion 2 February 2019 – 2 November 2019	Succeeded by Canelo Álvarez
