= Darnell Boone =

American boxer (born 1980)

Personal information
- Nickname: Deezol
- Born: Darnell Lamont Boone; January 21, 1980 (age 46) Youngstown, Ohio, U.S.
- Height: 5 ft 7 1/2 in (171 cm)
- Weight: Middleweight; Super middleweight; Light heavyweight; cruiserweight

Boxing career
- Reach: 72 1/2 in (184 cm)
- Stance: Orthodox

Boxing record
- Total fights: 58
- Wins: 24
- Win by KO: 13
- Losses: 28
- Draws: 6

Darnell Lamont Boone (born January 21, 1980) is an American professional boxer who currently fights at cruiserweight. Despite having never challenged for a world title, Boone is notable for facing several future world champions throughout his career, from middleweight to light heavyweight. In 2004, he was the first to score a knockdown against undefeated Olympic gold medalist Andre Ward, who went on to win a unanimous decision over Boone. In 2010, Boone caused a major upset when he knocked out future world champion Adonis Stevenson, who later gained revenge by knocking out Boone in 2013. Boone also defeated Willie Monroe Jr. in 2011, who later challenged twice for a world title. Other world champions Boone has faced include Jean Pascal, Erislandy Lara, and Sergey Kovalev (twice).

== Background ==
Having gotten a late start into the sport of boxing, Boone had just ten amateur fights before turning professional in 2004. Boone had originally gotten into boxing after attending his younger brother's boxing gym. In his first training session, he sparred with future world champion Kelly Pavlik.

== Professional boxing career ==
Boone held a record of 6-2-1 by the time he fought Andre Ward, with the two losses coming to former IBF middleweight contender Walid Smichet and future IBA contender Walter Wright. Ward was a heavy favorite despite being just 6-0, and Boone took the fight on just one week's notice. Despite scoring the first knockdown in Ward's career, he lost a unanimous decision.

After improving to 10–3–1, Boone faced future two-time world title contenders Enrique Ornelas, and Anthony Thompson, losing unanimous decisions in each.

After drawing on points against another future title contender in Lajuan Simon, Boone lost a decision to then-undefeated (12-0) Jean Pascal.

In April 2010, Boone was matched up with future lineal, Ring, and world titleholder Adonis Stevenson, in another fight Boone took on short notice against an undefeated fighter as Stevenson was 13–0 at the time. Boone at the time was 16–15–2, and on a five-fight losing streak (the first three fights being decision losses to Craig McEwan, Erislandy Lara, and Edwin Rodriguez, respectively). In an upset Boone finished Stevenson 17 seconds into the second round. Leading up to the fight, Boone had been self-trained.

Boone took another short-notice fight against future champion and then, 17-0-1 Sergey Kovalev in a light heavyweight bout. Boone fought hard, knocking Kovalev down but later lost a point and ultimately a split decision. Boone was then defeated via first-round TKO against Marco Antonio Periban.

— Anybody who's faced Darnell Boone knows what it is to be hit with a brick.
— Every top fighter who's come up through the ranks and fought Darnell Boone has either lost or nearly lost to him.

— Roy Jones Jr. and Max Kellerman on Boone's punching power.

Boone was then matched up with future world title challenger and then-undefeated 10-0 Willie Monroe Jr., winning by an eight-round split decision. In March 2013, Boone fought Stevenson again in a rematch, losing via sixth-round KO.

He made his cruiserweight debut in February 2017 against Ramon Luis Nicolas. He lost by unanimous decision.

After a UD loss to Artur Ziyatdinov (10–0, 8 KOs) in September 2019 at light heavyweight, Boone was inactive for a few years before returning to the ring in April 2024 in a cruiserweight bout against Joe Jones, which ended in a majority draw.

== Professional boxing record ==
58 fights	24 wins	28 losses
By knockout	13	8
By decision	11	20
Draws	6	

No.	Result	Record	Opponent	Type	Round, time	Date	Location	Notes
58	NoLoss	24–28–6	Zachary Randolph	TKO	5 (6), 1:31	May 3, 2025	Metro Plex Center, Youngstown, Ohio, U.S.	
57	NoLoss	24–27–6	Imran Haddabah	KO	5 (8), 1:25	Jan 25, 2025	Banquet Masters, St. Petersburg, Florida, U.S.	
56	NoLoss	24–26–6	Joel Mutombo	TKO	3 (6), 2:47	Jun 15, 2024	Shelby Co Fairgrounds, Shelbyville, Kentucky, U.S.	
55	Draw	24–25–6	Joe Jones	MD	4	Apr 27, 2024	Metro Plex Center, Youngstown, Ohio, U.S.	
54	NoLoss	24–25–5	Artur Ziyatdinov	UD	8	Sep 28, 2019	Montreal Casino, Montreal, Quebec, Canada	
53	Draw	24–24–5	Lamont Capers	MD	8	Nov 21, 2018	St. Lucy's Palermo Hall, Youngstown, Ohio, U.S.	
52	Win	24–24–4	Jorge Alfredo Leal	TKO	1 (6) 1:02	Aug 19, 2017	Rosarito Beach, Mexico	
51	Loss	23–24–4	Ramon Luis Nicolas	UD	8	Feb 25, 2017	National Sports Center, Blaine, Minnesota, U.S.	
50	Loss	23–23–4	Schiller Hyppolite	UD	10	Mar 12, 2016	Olympia Theatre, Montreal, Quebec, Canada	
49	Win	23–22–4	Jimmy Campbell	KO	2 (6), 0:37	Dec 12, 2015	Sparta Training Academy, Fishers, Indiana, U.S.	
48	Win	22–22–4	Samuel Miller	TKO	5 (8), 1:32	Aug 22, 2015	TradeWinds Island Grand Resort, St. Petersburg, Florida, U.S.	
47	Loss	21–22–4	Arif Magomedov	TKO	1 (8), 2:37	May 22, 2015	The D Casino Hotel, Las Vegas, Nevada, U.S.	
46	Win	21–21–4	Phillip Jackson Benson	TKO	6 (8), 1:27	Apr 18, 2015	Valley Forge Casino Resort, Upper Merion, Pennsylvania, U.S.	
45	Win	20–21–4	Dionisio Miranda	KO	3 (10), 0:09	Dec 11, 2014	TradeWinds Island Grand Resort, St. Petersburg, Florida, U.S.	
44	Draw	19–21–4	Morgan Fitch	SD	6	Nov 30, 2013	Mountaineer Casino Racetrack and Resort, Chester, West Virginia, U.S.	
43	Loss	19–21–3	Adonis Stevenson	KO	6 (10), 2:43	Mar 22, 2013	Bell Centre, Montreal, Quebec, Canada	
42	Loss	19–20–3	Derrick Webster	SD	6	Jan 19, 2013	Robert Treat Center, Newark, New Jersey, U.S.	
41	Loss	19–19–3	Sergey Kovalev	TKO	2 (8), 1:32	Jun 1, 2012	Sands Event Center, Bethlehem, Pennsylvania, U.S.	
40	Loss	19–18–3	Dyah Davis	UD	6	Oct 21, 2011	Foxwoods Resort Casino, Ledyard, Connecticut, U.S.	
39	Win	19–17–3	Marcus Don Hall	TKO	1 (6), 0:40	Aug 26, 2011	Buckhead Theatre, Atlanta, Georgia, U.S.	
38	Win	18–17–3	Willie Monroe Jr.	SD	8	Mar 29, 2011	B.B. King Blues Club & Grill, New York City, New York, U.S.	
37	Loss	17–17–3	Marco Antonio Peribán	TKO	1 (8), 1:20	Dec 3, 2010	Coliseo Olímpico, Guadalajara, Mexico	
36	Loss	17–16–3	Sergey Kovalev	SD	8	Oct 9, 2010	Metro Fitness, Atlanta, Georgia, U.S.	
35	Draw	17–15–3	Lennox Allen	MD	8	Aug 7, 2010	Aviator Sports and Events Center, New York City, New York, U.S.	
34	Win	17–15–2	Adonis Stevenson	TKO	2 (8), 0:17	Mar 19, 2010	Wicomico Youth and Civic Center, Salisbury, Maryland, U.S.	
33	Loss	16–15–2	Brandon Gonzales	UD	8	Jan 15, 2010	Grand Sierra Resort, Reno, Nevada, U.S.	
32	Loss	16–14–2	Jose Angel Rodriguez	UD	8	Jan 15, 2010	PAL Gym, Yonkers, New York, U.S.	
31	Loss	16–13–2	Edwin Rodríguez	UD	8	Oct 3, 2009	Twin River Event Center, Lincoln, Rhode Island, U.S.	
30	Loss	16–12–2	Erislandy Lara	UD	6	Jul 17, 2009	Planet Hollywood Resort & Casino, Paradise, Nevada, U.S.	
29	Loss	16–11–2	Craig McEwan	SD	8	Jun 27, 2009	Staples Center, Los Angeles, California, U.S.	
28	Win	16–10–2	Calvin Green	TKO	7 (10), 2:18	May 29, 2009	Belle Casino & Hotel, Baton Rouge, Louisiana, U.S.	
27	Win	15–10–2	Louis Turner	MD	10	Apr 4, 2009	Convention Center, Vicksburg, Mississippi, U.S.	
26	Loss	14–10–2	Brian Vera	UD	10	Jun 15, 2007	Chevrolet Centre, Youngstown, Ohio, U.S.	For IBA Intercontinental super middleweight title
25	Loss	14–9–2	Curtis Stevens	UD	10	Mar 22, 2007	Hammerstein Ballroom, New York City, New York, U.S.	
24	Win	14–8–2	James Johnson	UD	4	Feb 3, 2007	Silver Spurs Arena, Kissimmee, Florida, U.S.	
23	Loss	13–8–2	Jesús González	UD	8	Dec 15, 2006	Grand Plaza Hotel, Houston, Texas, U.S.	
22	Win	13–7–2	Norman Johnson	TKO	2 (4)	Dec 1, 2006	Club Europe, Doraville, Georgia, U.S.	
21	Win	12–7–2	William Johnson	UD	4	Nov 2, 2006	Chevrolet Centre, Youngstown, Ohio, U.S.	
20	Win	11–7–2	Marcus Brooks	UD	4	Oct 6, 2006	Club Europe, Atlanta, Georgia, U.S.	
19	Loss	10–7–2	Fernando Zuniga	MD	8	Sep 15, 2006	Omega Products International, Corona, California, U.S.	
18	Loss	10–6–2	Jean Pascal	UD	10	Jun 23, 2006	Uniprix Stadium, Montreal, Quebec, Canada	For vacant TAB super middleweight title
17	Draw	10–5–2	Lajuan Simon	PTS	6	Apr 28, 2006	Mohegan Sun Arena, Montville, Connecticut, U.S.	
16	Loss	10–5–1	Anthony Thompson	UD	10	Mar 31, 2006	Activities Center, Maywood, California, U.S.	
15	Loss	10–4–1	Enrique Ornelas	UD	8	Mar 3, 2006	Pechanga Resort & Casino, Temecula, California, U.S.	
14	Win	10–3–1	Rasheem Brown	UD	10	Feb 18, 2006	Mohegan Sun Arena, Montville, Connecticut, U.S.	
13	Win	9–3–1	James Countryman	UD	6	Feb 3, 2006	The Orleans, Paradise, Nevada, U.S.	
12	Win	8–3–1	Willie Lee	UD	6	Jan 13, 2006	A La Carte Event Pavilion, Tampa, Florida, U.S.	
11	Win	7–3–1	Ronald Johnson	MD	6	Dec 16, 2005	Grays Armory, Cleveland, Ohio, U.S.	
10	Loss	6–3–1	Andre Ward	UD	6	Nov 19, 2005	Rose Garden, Portland, Oregon, U.S.	
9	Win	6–2–1	Chris Archer	TKO	4 (6)	Nov 11, 2005	Heinz Field, Pittsburgh, Pennsylvania, U.S.	
8	Loss	5–2–1	Walid Smichet	TKO	6 (8), 1:58	Aug 31, 2005	Métropolis, Montreal, Quebec, Canada	
7	Win	5–1–1	James North	KO	3 (6)	Aug 12, 2005	Bull & Bear Tavern, Boardman, Ohio, U.S.	
6	Loss	4–1–1	Walter Wright	UD	8	May 24, 2005	Northern Quest Resort & Casino, Airway Heights, Washington, U.S.	
5	Draw	4–0–1	Walid Smichet	PTS	4	Feb 26, 2005	Casino du Lac-Leamy, Gatineau, Quebec, Canada	
4	Win	4–0	Alex Black	TKO	2 (6), 3:00	Nov 24, 2004	Byzantine Center at the Grove, Youngstown, Ohio, U.S.	
3	Win	3–0	Michael Rush	TKO	1 (4), 2:56	Sep 29, 2004	115 Bourbon Street, Merrionette Park, Illinois, U.S.	
2	Win	2–0	Shawn Williams	PTS	4	Jul 2, 2004	Fieldhouse, Struthers, Ohio, U.S.	
1	Win	1–0	Jay Holland	UD	4	May 21, 2004	Byzantine Center at the Grove, Youngstown, Ohio, U.S.	
