= Andre Ward vs. Sergey Kovalev II =

Boxing match

The Rematch
- Date: June 17, 2017
- Venue: Mandalay Bay Events Center, Las Vegas, Nevada, U.S.
- Title(s) on the line: WBA (Undisputed), IBF, WBO and vacant The Ring light heavyweight titles

Tale of the tape
Boxer	Andre Ward	Sergey Kovalev
Nickname	S.O.G.	Krusher
Hometown	Oakland, California, U.S.	Kopeysk, Chelyabinsk Oblast, Russia
Purse	$6,500,000	
Pre-fight record	31–0 (15 KO)	30–1–1 (26 KO)
Age	33 years, 3 months	34 years, 2 months
Height	6 ft 0 in (183 cm)	6 ft 0 in (183 cm)
Weight	175 lb (79 kg)	175 lb (79 kg)
Style	Orthodox	Orthodox
Recognition	WBA (Undisputed), IBF and WBO; Light Heavyweight Champion; The Ring/TBRB; No. 1 Ranked Light Heavyweight; The Ring No. 1 ranked pound-for-pound fighter 2-division world champion	WBO; No. 1 Ranked Light Heavyweight; WBA/IBF/The Ring/TBRB; No. 2 Ranked Light Heavyweight; The Ring No. 2 ranked pound-for-pound fighter Former unified light heavyweight champion

Result
- Ward wins via 8th-round TKO

Andre Ward vs. Sergey Kovalev II, billed as The Rematch, was a professional boxing match contested on June 17, 2017, for the unified WBA, IBF, WBO and vacant The Ring magazine light heavyweight championship.

Andre Ward won by an 8th round TKO. The bout was held in Las Vegas, Nevada and was televised on HBO Pay-per-view.

== Background ==
Kovalev's manager Egis Klimas announced that negotiations had begun for the rematch between Ward and Kovalev. According to the NSAC, The T-Mobile Arena was put on hold for June 17, 2017 on HBO PPV. On March 24, 2017 Kovalev revealed via Social Media that he had signed his end of the deal. It was also noted that the rematch would take place at the Mandalay Bay in Paradise, Nevada on HBO PPV.

On April 4, 2017, Roc Nation Sports and Main Events confirmed that terms were agreed for the rematch to take place on HBO PPV. The fight being billed as "No Excuses". Ward addressed the public by stating, "I'm going to keep it short and sweet. You got what you asked for -- now you have to see me on June 17. This time leave the excuses at home." The Las Vegas Sun confirmed the bout will take place at the Mandalay Bay Events Center. The fight purses were revealed before the fight with Ward taking a guaranteed career-high $6.5 million and Kovalev, not having a base purse, would receive a percentage of PPV and gate revenue.

=== Press conferences ===
The fight had press conferences in three cities in the United States:

- April 10, 2017 — New York City, New York
- April 11, 2017 — Oakland, California
- April 12, 2017 — Los Angeles, California

== The fight ==
In front of 10,592, The fight ended in the 8th round with a victory for Ward once again. A big right hand from Ward had Kovalev in trouble which was followed by several blows to the liver area. Many spectators still attest to the multiple low-blows that went unchecked with Kovalev unsure what to do. In an attempt to make it more obvious, Kovalev was seen flailing and doubling over in pain as his cup was repeatedly raised from hits by Ward- with no apparent regard from the referee. With Kovalev appearing hurt against ropes, the referee Tony Weeks stopped the fight.

At the time of stoppage, two judges had Ward ahead 67-66, whilst the third judge had it 68-65 in favour of Kovalev. CompuBox stats showed that Ward landed 80 of 238 punches (34%) whilst Kovalev landed 95 of his 407 thrown (23%).

== Aftermath ==
Ward praised Kovalev in the post-fight interview, "He's a good fighter, and I have nothing but respect for him. First time around, the man is world champion, and he's been on top a long time. I give him credit. He is a great fighter, and when you fight great fighters, you have to raise your game." Kovalev said the fight could have continued, "I don't know. I can't explain it. Not every round, but I thought I was doing very good. I was better, and he was better this fight. I didn't feel like I was getting knocked down with his punches --- I could have continued," Kovalev said. "I didn't feel the punch. This is fighting. We are boxers. Yes, he did punch me, but he didn't hurt me. The fight should have continued."

On September 21, via his website, Ward announced his retirement from boxing at the age of 33. In a statement, he said, "I want to be clear – I am leaving because my body can no longer put up with the rigors of the sport and therefore my desire to fight is no longer there. If I cannot give my family, my team, and the fans everything that I have, then I should no longer be fighting."

=== Viewership ===
According to Yahoo Sports, the fight only generated around 130,000 buys on HBO PPV. The replay was shown on regular HBO averaging 752,000 viewers and peaked at 947,000, which was during the final round.

The event produced a live gate of $2,187,340 from 6,366 tickets sold, including complimentary tickets, the full attendance was announced as 10,592. The venue was set up to hold 10,748.

== Fight card ==
Confirmed bouts:

Weight Class		vs.		Result	Round
Light heavyweight	(United States) Andre Ward (c)	def.	(Russia) Sergey Kovalev	TKO	8
Super bantamweight	(Cuba) Guillermo Rigondeaux (c)	NC.	(Mexico) Moises Flores
Light Heavyweight	(Russia) Dmitry Bivol	def.	(United States) Cedric Agnew	TKO	4
Middleweight	(United States) Luís Arias	def.	(Russia) Arif Magomedov	TKO	5
Featherweight	(United States) Tramaine Williams	def.	(United States) Christopher Martin	TKO	2

== Broadcasting ==
Country	Broadcaster
Argentina	Space
Australia	Main Event
Ireland	Sky Sports
Panama	RPC-TV
Russia	Match TV
United Kingdom	Sky Sports
United States	HBO

Preceded by First bout	Andre Ward's bouts 17 June 2017	Retired
Preceded by First bout	Sergey Kovalev's bouts 17 June 2017	Succeeded by vs. Vyacheslav Shabranskyy
