= Andre Ward =

American boxer (born 1984)

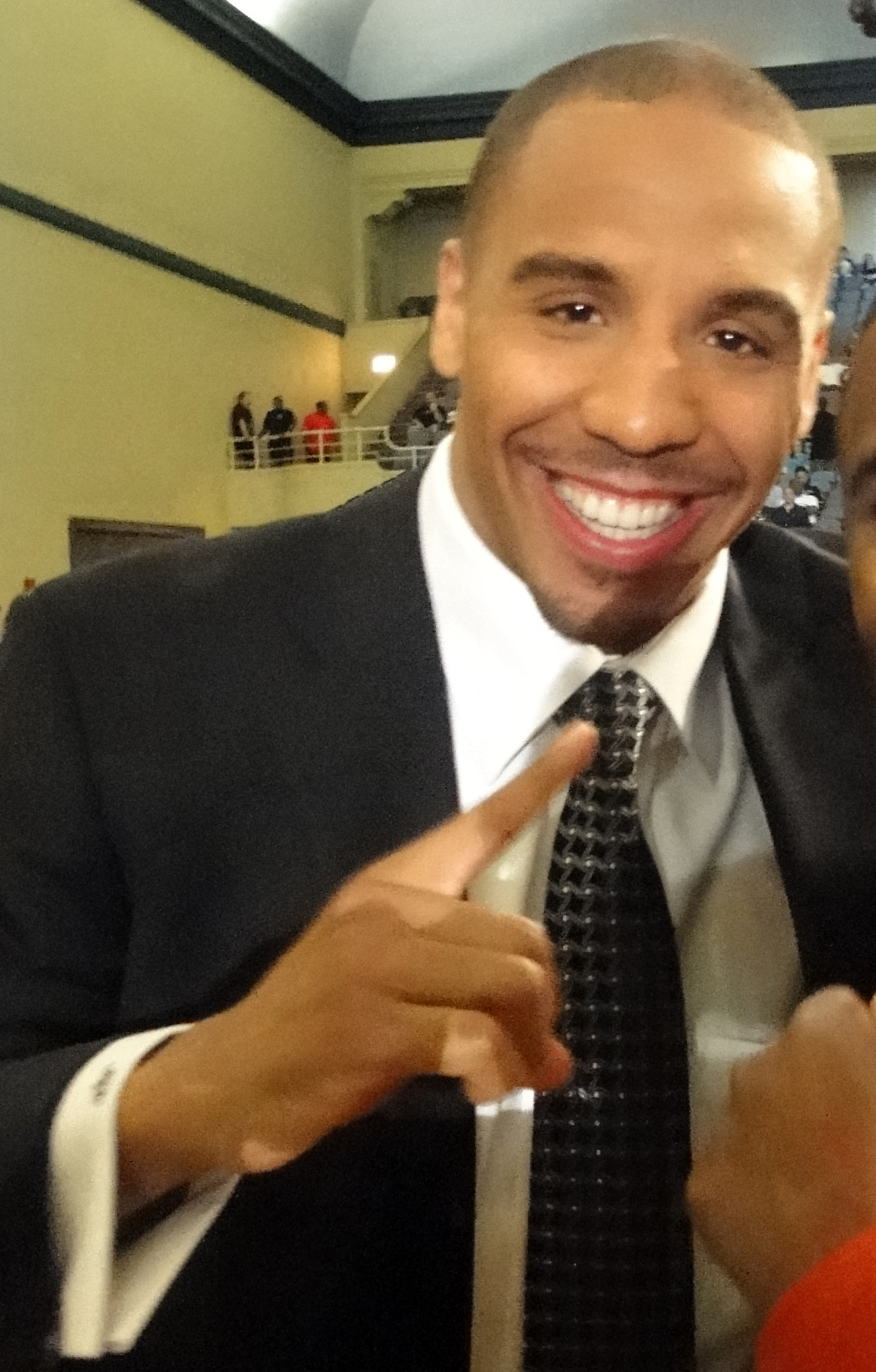
- Ward in 2011

Personal information
- Nickname: S.O.G. ("Son of God")
- Born: Andre Michael Ward; February 23, 1984 (age 42) San Francisco, California, U.S.
- Height: 6 ft 0 in (183 cm)
- Weight: Super middleweight; Light heavyweight

Boxing career
- Reach: 71 in (180 cm)
- Stance: Orthodox

Boxing record
- Total fights: 32
- Wins: 32
- Win by KO: 16
Medal record
Men's amateur boxing
Representing United States
Olympic Games
Gold medal – first place	2004 Athens	Light heavyweight

Andre Michael Ward (born February 23, 1984) is an American former professional boxer who competed from 2004 to 2017. He retired with an undefeated record and held multiple world championships in two weight classes, including unified super middleweight titles between 2009 and 2015, and unified light heavyweight titles between 2016 and 2017.

During his reign as light heavyweight champion, Ward was ranked as the world's best pound for pound boxer, by The Ring magazine. In 2020, he was named Fighter of the Decade by Sports Illustrated. In 2024, ESPN ranked him as the 7th greatest men's boxer of the 21st century.

As an amateur boxer, Ward won the light heavyweight gold medal at the 2004 Olympics and turned professional later that year. He rose to worldwide prominence upon entering the Super Six World Boxing Classic tournament in 2009, where he won the World Boxing Association (WBA) super middleweight title (Super version) from Mikkel Kessler in the opening group stage. In 2011, Ward defeated World Boxing Council (WBC) champion Carl Froch in the tournament final to unify the titles, as well as winning the vacant Ring magazine title. That same year, Ward was named Fighter of the Year by The Ring and the Boxing Writers' Association of America.

In 2016, following a long period of sporadic in-ring activity, Ward moved up to light heavyweight and won the WBA (Undisputed version), International Boxing Federation (IBF) and World Boxing Organization (WBO) titles from then-undefeated Sergey Kovalev. This earned Ward the Comeback of the Year award by The Ring. He successfully defended his titles in a rematch against Kovalev a year later, after which he retired from boxing. Ward was inducted into the International Boxing Hall of Fame as part of the Class of 2021, his first year of eligibility.

== Early life ==
Andre was born in San Francisco, California, the son of Frank Ward, an Irish American and Madeline Arvie Taylor, an African American. Andre's career started when his father took him to U.S. Karate School of the Arts, a boxing gym in Hayward, California, when he was nine years old. While his mother was rarely present, battling a cocaine addiction on the streets of San Francisco, Ward lived with his father, a former amateur boxer himself. He struggled with a heroin addiction and sometime after age 12, his godfather and trainer Virgil Hunter became his temporary guardian. Ward lost his first amateur fight but didn't lose another fight, amateur or professional, after 1998.

He attended Hayward High School.

== Amateur career ==
Ward started boxing in 1994. In 2002, he won the Under 19 National Championship and was also a two time U.S. National Champion in 2001 and 2003 at middleweight. Ward finished his amateur career with a record of 115 wins and 5 losses.

=== Amateur highlights ===
- 2001 United States Amateur Middleweight Champion
- 2002 Under 19 National Championship
- 2003 United States Amateur Light Heavyweight Champion
- Won the Light Heavyweight gold medal for the United States at the 2004 Olympics in Athens, Greece becoming the first American boxer to capture gold in 8 years.

==== Results ====
- 1st round – Second Place at the 1st AIBA American 2004 Olympic Qualifying Tournament
- 2nd round – Defeated Clemente Russo (Italy) 17–9
- Quarterfinals – Defeated Evgeny Makarenko (Russia) 23–16
- Semifinals – Defeated Utkirbek Haydarov (Uzbekistan) 17–15
- Gold Medal Match – Defeated Magomed Aripgadjiev (Belarus) 20–13

== Professional career ==
=== Super middleweight ===
==== Early years ====
Ward made his pro debut on December 18, 2004, by scoring a second round TKO over Chris Molina. On February 5, 2005, Ward fought in his second pro fight against Kenny Kost. Ward overcame a rocky second round, in which he was hurt by a left hook, to win by unanimous decision. Ward defeated Roy Ashworth on April 7, 2005, by disqualification.

Ward won his next three fights, all by knockout, before going up against Darnell Boone on November 19, 2005. Ward was knocked down for the first time in his career in round four. Despite the knockdown, Ward went on to win by unanimous decision.

After the fight with Boone, Ward went on to win his next six fights, including TKO victories over undefeated Andy Kolle (this fight was the last of five that Ward fought within the middleweight limit of 160 lbs) and Francisco Diaz. On November 16, 2007, Ward beat undefeated Roger Cantrell by fifth-round TKO in Saint Lucia.

At this point, Ward's record was 14 wins, no losses. He was ready to step up to his biggest challenge against big American puncher Allan Green (25–1, 18 KOs), with the fight scheduled to take place on February 2, 2008, on HBO. The fight was called off because Green had an obligation with ESPN to fight Rubin Williams on January 4. Green won the bout, and had hoped to fight Ward later in the year. He eventually got his chance two years later, losing a unanimous decision.

On March 20, 2008, at the HP Pavilion in San Jose, California, Ward defeated Rubin Williams by seventh-round TKO. Ward hit Williams with jabs and straight left hands almost at will, opening a bad cut over Williams' left eye in the process. The cut would force the referee to stop the fight.

Ward faced Jerson Ravelo on June 20, 2008, in Georgetown, Cayman Islands, for the vacant regional NABO super-middleweight title. Ward dominated Ravelo for most of the fight en route to a TKO victory in the eighth round.

On May 16, 2009, at the Oracle Arena in Oakland, California, Ward defeated former prospect Edison Miranda by unanimous decision. The scores were 116–112, 119–109, and 119–109 for Ward. Ward showed he had an inside game as well as an outside game. Miranda couldn't stay up with Ward's versatility around the ring. Miranda said of Ward in the post fight, "I thought it was going to be easier, but it was tougher than I was expected. I don't feel cheated. Andre is the champion. I have respect for him." Ward, who fought his biggest name to date said, "This is kind of a bittersweet victory. I'm happy and excited because the fans had a good time, and there were a lot of people here, but I'm not 100 percent happy with my performance. I've got to go look at the tape. I did some things well, but I felt I could have improved in other areas."

On September 12, 2009, at the Pechanga Resort and Casino in Temecula, California, Ward defeated Shelby Pudwill by TKO in the 3rd round.

==== Super Six World Boxing Classic ====
===== Ward vs. Kessler =====
Ward's first fight in the tournament took place in his hometown of Oakland, California, against Ring Magazine #1 ranked and joint tournament favorite Mikkel Kessler (42–1, 32 KO) on November 21, 2009. Kessler's WBA super-middleweight championship was also at stake. Ward defeated Kessler to via technical decision in round 11 to win his first world title. Kessler was the strong favorite going into Showtime's Super Six tournament. In a career-defining performance, undefeated hometown favorite Ward put the U.S. on the board in the Super Six and captured the WBA super middleweight title with a dominant 11 round technical decision over Denmark's Kessler in their Group Stage 1 bout. The fight was stopped in round 11 due to cuts on Kessler's face caused by what was deemed unintentional headbutts by Ward. The fight went to the scorecards and Ward was far ahead by scores of 98–92, 98–92, and 97–93 at the time of the stoppage.

===== Ward vs. Green =====
In January 2010 Jermain Taylor announced his exit from Showtime's Super Six World Boxing Classic tournament. The Ring Top 10 ranked super-middleweight Allan Green (25–1, 18 KOs) was selected as his replacement and challenged Andre Ward on June 19. Ward, defending the WBA super middleweight title, outclassed an opponent who spent most of the fight with his back against the ropes. Ward defeated Green by unanimous decision on June 19, 2010. Though the 30-year-old gamely fought on, the knockout he needed to win never appeared remotely likely and he looked a spent man by the end as he picked up the second loss of his 31-fight pro career. Throughout the fight, Ward out landed Green by nearly 200 punches. All three judges scored the fight lop-sided 120–108 for Ward, who said post-fight of his win, "This means a lot to me. Couldn't get caught up in the first defense too much mentally. Now that it's over with, I'm ecstatic I was able to defend this belt one time. I feel like a real champion now." Ward stated his only regret was that he wasn't able to stop Green, who turned up to survive. Ward advanced to the semi-finals.

Ward was exempt from the final preliminary fight in the Super Six because he had already secured a number one position in the elimination rounds and his designated opponent (Andre Dirrell) had dropped out of the tournament. Dirrell's trainer and uncle Leon Lawson Jr., told ESPN that Dirrell had neurological problems. Instead, Ward successfully defended his WBA super middleweight title, unanimously outpointing another top 10 ranked super middleweight, Sakio Bika (28–4–2), in front of a sparse crowd at Oracle Arena on Saturday night. Fighting in front of his hometown crowd as part of a dual-site co-main event, Ward didn't land many big shots but repeatedly hit Bika with a stinging left jab that the challenger was unable to counter. Ward won all 12 rounds on one judges scorecard and was ahead 118–110 on the other two. Bika landed 201 of his 612 punches (33%), but Ward was more precise with his shots, landing 235 of 398 (59%). Ward later admitted it was his toughest fight to date, since he became professional.

===== Ward vs. Abraham =====
Ward's opponent at the semi-final stage was top 10 ranked super middleweight Arthur Abraham (32–2, 26 KOs). The fight took place on May 14, 2011, at the Home Depot Center in Carson, California. Abraham entered having lost two of his previous three bouts. Ward started out slow with Abraham, trying to find a way to penetrate his tight defense. After a competitive first few rounds, Ward seized control of the fight, using his ring savvy and instincts to control Abraham. Although Abraham was somewhat passive at times, he gave an earnest effort and frequently threw combinations that were mostly blocked by Ward. Abraham hurt Ward a couple of times in the final round, but it wasn't enough to finish Ward, who had dominated the fight and won a lopsided unanimous decision. The three judges scored the bout 120–108, 118–110, and 118–111. ESPN had it 118–110 in favor of Ward. Abraham didn't believe he had lost the fight with such wide scores. Over 12 rounds, Ward threw 289 jabs. In total he landed 178 of 444 total punches thrown (40%).

In the post fight interviews, Abraham said through a translator, "I started well, and I thought I did good the first three rounds He didn't hit me, and I was blocking a lot of his shots. But then I tried for the knockout, and I couldn't do it. I cramped up, and I got too tense." Ward had to adjust his game plan as he was unable to fight on the inside. He said, "We're going to the final, baby. Arthur is strong, and he's a hard hitter, [but] we showed that we can win in a way other than our original game plan [...] "I wish the ref had let me fight on the inside, because that's what I had planned for. But we made adjustments and got the win."

===== Ward vs. Froch =====
Advancing to the final of the Super Six, Ward fought WBC super middleweight champion Carl Froch (28–1, 20 KOs) in front of 5,626 at Boardwalk Hall on December 17, 2011. Ward and Froch were rated #1 and #2 respectively by Ring magazine, and the vacant Ring magazine super middleweight title was on the line, as well as Froch and Ward's super middleweight titles.

Ward won the Super Six World Boxing Classic tournament via unanimous decision. Over the first seven rounds, Ward outboxed Froch, successfully using his jab to neutralize Froch and beating Froch to the punch from a distance and at close range. In the later rounds, Ward seemed to take his foot off the gas, leaving Froch to win a couple rounds near the end of the fight, though they were close and fairly competitive rounds. An MRI later revealed that Ward injured his lead left hand on which he relied for landing hooks to Froch's head. The hand was broken in two places. Ward noted extreme pain in the sixth round of the fight as well as one week prior, though the initial X-ray came back clear. The judges scorecards were 115–113, 115–113, and 118–110 all in favor of Ward. CompuBox statistics showed that Ward landed 243 of 573 punches thrown (42%), whilst Froch landed 156 of 683 punches (23%). After the bout, Ward gave a victory speech, "I can't believe it, I can't believe it -- it's not so unbelievable that we never thought we were going to win, but now that it's happened, it is unbelievable. We told you this is what we wanted to do. We wanted to fight on the inside and on the outside, and we pulled it off tonight. We were able to beat him to the punch, and that's what won us the fight." Froch also praised Ward in winning the tournament, "Fair credit to Andre Ward. He's very good defensively. I lost the fight, fair and square. It was quite hard to hit him. The name of the game is to not get hit, and he did that well."

Ward won the vacant Ring with his Super Six World Boxing Classic win against Froch, despite some independent sources rating then-undefeated IBF champion Lucian Bute at number one or two at the time. The fight peaked at 580,000 viewers on Showtime.

The World Boxing Council Board of Governors voted to make Ward "Champion in Recess" due to a broken hand Ward had sustained during the Super Six tournament.

==== Ward vs. Dawson ====
Ward's next fight was announced on June 22, 2012, to take place at the Oracle Arena in Oakland, California on September 8, 2012, against WBC and The Ring light heavyweight champion Chad Dawson. The fight, billed as "Ward vs. Dawson – World Champions – Made In America'' took place at 168 lbs for Ward's super middleweight titles. Dawson was coming off a big win against future Hall of Famer Bernard Hopkins in April. At the press conference, he said that it was his desire to drop down in weight and challenge Ward rather than fight lesser-known opponents at light heavyweight. Dawson started his career at super middleweight, but hadn't fought at the weight since February 2006.

The fight ended in round ten with a technical knockout victory for Ward when Dawson asked the referee for the fight to be ended with the words: "It's over. I'm finished. I'm done." In the first two rounds, Ward and Dawson felt each other out, with neither fighter having much success, though Dawson was able to land a few counter right hooks as Ward lunged inside. In the third round, Ward dropped Dawson with a left hook and dominated the round. Again in the fourth round, Ward was able to drop Dawson, in another dominating round. From fifth round until the end of the fight, Ward was able to neutralize Dawson's jab and work rate, seemingly out boxing and frustrating Dawson throughout. Then, in the tenth round, Ward dropped Dawson to a knee after a solid combination, which prompted referee Steve Smoger to stop the fight after Dawson could not continue. At the time of stoppage, Ward was ahead 90–79, 89–80, and 89–80 on all three judges' scorecards. For the loss, Dawson earned $600,000, whilst Ward had a total $1,367,500 purse.

The fight was watched by an average 1.3 million viewers on HBO. In 2013, Dawson spoke out about the fight and said it was a "set-up by HBO and other people." He claimed that it was done to make him look "vulnerable and expose him with weight loss."

==== Ward vs. Pavlik cancelled fight ====
Ward was scheduled to defend his super middleweight titles against former unified middleweight champion Kelly Pavlik on January 26, 2013, at the Galen Center in Los Angeles. However, an injury sustained by Ward originally postponed the bout for 4 more weeks and the fight was expected to take place on February 23, 2013. The injury was more severe than originally thought and led to the cancellation of the fight as well as the subsequent retirement of Pavlik.

On March 23, 2013, the WBC stripped Ward of the WBC super-middleweight title belt for being inactive for a long period of time, and for failing to face a mandatory challenger. They granted him champion emeritus status. Ward claimed a shoulder injury that required surgery was the reason for his inactivity, but the WBC claimed that Ward had not provided any medical evidence or even given them a rough availability date.

On May 20, Ward relinquished the champion emeritus title, stating that he did not believe the WBC had the right to strip him of the world title because he was willing and able to defend it within the period specified by the WBC's rules. Ward was praised for standing up to the WBC.

==== Ward vs. Rodríguez ====
Ward spent most of 2013 recovering from injuries, and feuding with promoter Dan Goossen, over the inclusion of a co-manager in Ward's promotional contract. The case has been to court or arbitration on 3 separate occasions. Each time, Goossen was deemed in the right. Ward defended his WBA and Ring titles against unbeaten Edwin Rodríguez in Ontario, California in November 2013 with a wide unanimous decision. The fight started with rough tactics until Jack Reiss made an unprecedented move, penalizing both fighters two points each and warning them that he would end the fight if it did not clean up. Ward went on to dominate the rest of the fight. The three judges scored the fight 118–106, 117–107, and 116–108 all in favor of Ward.

Ward spent all of 2014 inactive, still feuding with Goossen. Dan Goossen died of complications from liver cancer in September 2014, leaving the future of Andre Ward's boxing career even further in doubt.

On February 19, 2015 The Ring stripped Ward of the Ring champion belt due to him not having defended his title against a top #5 contender in the last two years.

==== Ward vs. Smith ====
In April 2015 Ward announced that he would make a ring return after a 19 month long lay off. Ward signed with Jay Z's Roc Nation Sports in January 2015 and this was announced to be the first event under the Roc Nation banner. It was later confirmed that he would fight on June 20, against British Paul Smith (35–5, 20 KOs) at the Oracle Arena in California at a 172 lbs catchweight fight. The fight was to take place on BET. Roc Nation did reach out to HBO, where Ward had worked as an analyst previously, but upon hearing his opponent, they passed on the opportunity to showcase Ward's long-awaited return. Ward won via TKO in the 9th round. Ward was winning every round at the time of stoppage 80–72 on all three judges' scorecards. Smith missed weight, coming in at 176.4 lbs and was fined 20% ($45,000) of his $225,000 purse by the California State Athletic Commission, half of which went to Ward and half to the commission. Despite being available in over 90 million homes, the fight averaged 323,000 viewers on BET.

On November 12, 2015, in advance of his upcoming move up to the light heavyweight division, Ward vacated his WBA super middleweight title. Ward originally claimed the belt in November 2009 with a victory over long-time champion Mikkel Kessler in his opening fight of the Super Six tournament.

=== Light heavyweight ===
==== Ward vs. Barrera ====
Boxing Scene reported In January 2016, Ward's light heavyweight debut was set against Cuban boxer Sullivan Barrera (17–0, 12 KOs) at the Oracle Arena. on March 26, 2016, on HBO. Barrera was risking his IBF mandatory position in this fight. Barrera became the mandatory to Kovalev's IBF title when he stopped German Karo Murat in December 2015. According to Ward, he wasn't moving up in weight for the money, but rather daring to be great. 8,532 fans packed the arena on fight night. En route to a wide unanimous decision victory, Ward dropped Barrera to the canvas in the third round as he turned a left hook while on the ropes. Barrera was also dropped in the eighth round from a body shot, but referee Raul Caiz Sr. saw it as a low blow and as a result deducted a point from Ward. Ward dictated the pace for the vast majority of the bout, showcasing good strength and ring generalship against Barrera. The three judges scored the fight 117–109, 119–109, and 117–108. Ward landed 166 from 463 thrown (36%) whilst Barrera landed 111 of 722 punches thrown (15%). When asked about the potential mega fight against Kovalev, Ward said, "It's never a problem. You look at my track record. I want to fight the best. I've always fought the best. Sergey Kovalev, he's a great champion." For the fight, Ward earned $1.85 million and Barrera earned a $450,000 purse. The fight averaged 1.064 million viewers and peaked at 1.152 million viewers.

==== Ward vs. Brand ====
On June 28, 2016, Roc Nation Sport confirmed that Ward would fight once more before his mega fight with Kovalev on July 30 against 39 year old Colombian boxer Alexander Brand (25–1, 19 KOs). The fight was to take place in Oakland, California at the Oracle Center. This was the eighth and final time Ward fought in his hometown. Brand entered the fight as a 100-1 underdog. In front of 8,653 hometown fans, Ward unanimously outpointed Brand to claim the vacant WBO International light heavyweight title. All three judges had the fight 120–108 for Ward. Brand, who looked as though he came to survive 12 rounds, didn't initiate any action, which ultimately led him to lose all the rounds on the three scorecards. Ward looked slow in the victory, not looking like the same fighter he was in 2011. Ward dictated the fight however with a strong jab. This showed in round 7 when Brand's right eye suddenly started to swollen up. Ward spoke to HBO in the post fight interview about fighting Kovalev next saying: "I'm excited, I'm looking forward to it. I'll see you in November." This was Ward's third fight in eight months, after only fighting three times from 2012 to 2015. Ward landed 190 of 490 punches thrown (39%), and Brand landed 45 of 285 (16%). Ward earned a purse of $850,000 compared to the small amount of $30,000 earned by Brand. The fight averaged on 742,000 viewers on HBO. The dip could have been due to 21 million tuning in to the Olympics on NBC.

==== Ward vs. Kovalev ====
Ward fought the unified IBF, WBA (Super) and WBO light heavyweight champion Sergey Kovalev at the T-Mobile Arena on November 19, 2016. The fight was announced in June, with a rematch clause, and both fighters retained their undefeated records through interim bouts. This event marked Ward's first time fighting in Las Vegas, Nevada.

After being knocked down in the second round, he won a controversial decision with all three judges scoring the fight 114–113 in favor of Ward. Ward reiterated how the events of the evening unfolded, "I got off the canvas against the hardest puncher in the division and smiled. I took the fight to him and closed the show." Ward received Kovalev's WBA (Super), IBF, and WBO light heavyweight titles and became a two-division world champion.

Boxing experts have claimed that the judging was unfair. "It was a classic hometown decision. Kovalev won the fight", Larry Merchant stated after the fight. Kovalev's promoter, Kathy Duva, said, "We got a great fight, which is what boxing needed. But we also got a bad decision, which is not what boxing needed." On the same token, many boxing fans have applauded the decision. Paulie Malignaggi noted the high degree of difficulty both fighters faced that night and doubted the prospect of a one-sided affair in the case of a rematch. Still, he concluded that Kovalev faded late in the fight. Promoter Eddie Hearn added that Kovalev lacked a sense of urgency after the halfway point. Gennady Golovkin's trainer, Abel Sanchez, scored the fight 114–112 for Kovalev. For the fight, Kovalev received a minimum purse of $2 million and Ward's purse was a career-high $5 million. CompuBox stats showed that Kovalev landed more punches, 126 of 474 punches; Ward landed 116 out of 337 thrown .

The fight reported to have done 160,000 buys on HBO PPV. A replay was shown on HBO prior to the Lomachenko–Walters title fight, which averaged 834,000 viewers. The event produced a live gate of $3.3 million from 10,066 tickets sold, including complimentary tickets, the full attendance was announced as 13,310. The venue was set up to hold 14,227.

==== Ward vs. Kovalev II ====
Kovalev's manager Egis Klimas announced that negotiations had begun for the rematch between Ward and Kovalev. Ward threatened to retire if he didn't get things "his way" for the rematch. According to the NSAC, The T-Mobile Arena was put on hold for June 17, 2017, on HBO PPV. On March 24, 2017, Kovalev revealed via Social Media that he had signed his end of the deal. It was also noted that the rematch would take place at the Mandalay Bay in Paradise, Nevada on HBO PPV. On April 4, Roc Nation Sports and Main Events confirmed that terms were agreed for the rematch to take place on HBO PPV. The fight was billed as No Excuses. Ward addressed the public by stating, "I'm going to keep it short and sweet. You got what you asked for -- now you have to see me on June 17. This time leave the excuses at home." The Las Vegas Sun confirmed the bout will take place at the Mandalay Bay Events Center. On April 10, Kathy Duva said that there would be no rematch clause in place for a third fight, meaning whoever would win, would not be obliged to fight another rematch. The fight purses were revealed before the fight with Ward taking a guaranteed $6.5 million and Kovalev, not having a base purse, would receive a percentage of PPV and gate revenue.

In front of 10,592, the fight ended with controversy in the 8th round with a victory for Ward. A right hand from Ward had Kovalev in trouble, which was followed by several low blows. Tony Weeks stopped the fight, with Kovalev sitting on the middle rope, visibly hurt from the low blows he was subjected to. At the time of stoppage, two judges had Ward ahead 67–66, whilst the third judge had it 68–65 in favor of Kovalev. CompuBox stats showed that Ward landed 80 of 238 punches (34%) whilst Kovalev landed more punches with 95 of his 407 thrown (23%).

Ward praised Kovalev in the post-fight interview, "He's a good fighter, and I have nothing but respect for him. First time around, the man is world champion, and he's been on top a long time. I give him credit. He is a great fighter, and when you fight great fighters, you have to raise your game." Kovalev said the fight could have continued and pointed to low blows, "I couldn't believe it, I could win," he said."Only a low blow (hurt me)," he added, before watching video of the end of the fight and observing: "Low blow - and I felt this. Again, another one. The first one was on the border, and the second one a low blow."

According to Yahoo! Sports, the fight only generated around 130,000 buys on HBO PPV. The replay was shown on regular HBO averaging 752,000 viewers and peaked at 947,000, which was during the final round. The event produced a live gate of $2,187,340 from 6,366 tickets sold, including complimentary tickets, the full attendance was announced as 10,592. The venue was set up to hold 10,748.

On August 23, 2017, Ward announced that his contract with HBO had expired, making him a free agent. He confirmed that he was still under contract with Roc Nation Sports, but rumours indicated that he could sign with Top Rank. His appearance as an analyst for the Crawford vs. Indongo fight sparked further rumours.

=== Retirement ===
On September 21, 2017, via his website, Ward announced his retirement from boxing at the age of 33. In a statement, he said, "I want to be clear – I am leaving because my body can no longer put up with the rigors of the sport and therefore my desire to fight is no longer there. If I cannot give my family, my team, and the fans everything that I have, then I should no longer be fighting." Also in the statement read, "As I walk away from the sport of boxing today, I leave at the top of your glorious mountain, which was always my vision and my dream. I did it. We did it. From the bottom of my heart, thank you to everyone who has played a part in my journey. You know who you are. I could not have done this without you." Ward ended his career undefeated with 32 wins, 16 of which came inside the distance.

On December 15, 2020, Ward was announced as being inducted into the International Boxing Hall of Fame as part of the Class of 2021, his first year of eligibility.

== Fighting style ==
His trainer, Virgil Hunter, says Ward harnesses his speed and ring intelligence to control distance and pace in fights while maintaining high punch accuracy and counterpunching skills. A natural left-handed fighter who boxes in an orthodox stance, Ward's best punches typically come from the lead left, including a sharp, piston-like jab, which he shoots to the body as well as the head. An injury and eventual surgery to his right shoulder made Ward even more reliant on the left hand, causing him to switch to southpaw on occasion to land his power punches. Connecting with his own punches, particularly the short left hook and uppercut, while clinching, weaving and smothering his opponent's punches is commonplace in Ward fights. He attributes his self-described "formless" style to years of studying Roy Jones Jr., Bernard Hopkins, and Floyd Mayweather Jr. Ward also makes effective use of the jab to the body while out of punching range. In an article on FoxSports.com, boxing writer Zachary Alapi speculates that Ward is one of the best in-fighters in boxing, stating thus: "...merciless when it comes to wrestling in the clinch while simultaneously throwing punches to prevent a break, Ward is also willing to fight dirty if he has to."

== Professional boxing record ==
32 fights	32 wins	0 losses
By knockout	16	0
By decision	15	0
By disqualification	1	0

No.	Result	Record	Opponent	Type	Round, time	Date	Location	Notes
32	Win	32–0	Sergey Kovalev	TKO	8 (12), 2:29	Jun 17, 2017	Mandalay Bay Events Center, Paradise, Nevada, U.S.	Retained WBA (Super), IBF, and WBO light heavyweight titles; Won vacant The Ring light heavyweight title
31	Win	31–0	Sergey Kovalev	UD	12	Nov 19, 2016	T-Mobile Arena, Paradise, Nevada, U.S.	Won WBA (Super), IBF, and WBO light heavyweight titles
30	Win	30–0	Alexander Brand	UD	12	Aug 6, 2016	Oracle Arena, Oakland, California, U.S.	Won vacant WBO International light heavyweight title
29	Win	29–0	Sullivan Barrera	UD	12	Mar 26, 2016	Oracle Arena, Oakland, California, U.S.	
28	Win	28–0	Paul Smith	TKO	9 (12), 1:45	Jun 20, 2015	Oracle Arena, Oakland, California, U.S.	
27	Win	27–0	Edwin Rodríguez	UD	12	Nov 16, 2013	Citizens Business Bank Arena, Ontario, California, U.S.	Retained WBA (Super) and The Ring super middleweight titles
26	Win	26–0	Chad Dawson	TKO	10 (12), 2:45	Sep 8, 2012	Oracle Arena, Oakland, California, U.S.	Retained WBA (Super), WBC, and The Ring super middleweight titles
25	Win	25–0	Carl Froch	UD	12	Dec 17, 2011	Boardwalk Hall, Atlantic City, New Jersey, U.S.	Retained WBA (Super) super middleweight title; Won WBC and vacant The Ring super middleweight titles; Super Six World Boxing Classic: final
24	Win	24–0	Arthur Abraham	UD	12	May 14, 2011	Home Depot Center, Carson, California, U.S.	Retained WBA (Super) super middleweight title; Super Six World Boxing Classic: semi-final
23	Win	23–0	Sakio Bika	UD	12	Nov 27, 2010	Oracle Arena, Oakland, California, U.S.	Retained WBA (Super) super middleweight title
22	Win	22–0	Allan Green	UD	12	Jun 19, 2010	Oracle Arena, Oakland, California, U.S.	Retained WBA (Super) super middleweight title; Super Six World Boxing Classic: group stage 2
21	Win	21–0	Mikkel Kessler	TD	11 (12), 1:42	Nov 21, 2009	Oracle Arena, Oakland, California, U.S.	Won WBA (Super) super middleweight title; Super Six World Boxing Classic: group stage 1; Unanimous TD: Kessler cut from accidental head clashes
20	Win	20–0	Shelby Pudwill	TKO	3 (10), 2:16	Sep 12, 2009	Pechanga Resort & Casino, Temecula, California, U.S.	
19	Win	19–0	Edison Miranda	UD	12	May 16, 2009	Oracle Arena, Oakland, California, U.S.	Retained NABF and WBO–NABO super middleweight titles
18	Win	18–0	Henry Buchanan	UD	12	Feb 6, 2009	Tachi Palace Hotel & Casino, Lemoore, California, U.S.	Won WBO–NABO super middleweight title; Won vacant NABF super middleweight title
17	Win	17–0	Esteban Camou	TKO	3 (10), 2:46	Dec 13, 2008	Morongo Casino Resort & Spa, Cabazon, California, U.S.	
16	Win	16–0	Jerson Ravelo	TKO	8 (12), 2:37	Jun 20, 2008	Royal Watler Cruise Terminal, George Town, Cayman Islands	Won vacant WBO–NABO super middleweight title
15	Win	15–0	Rubin Williams	TKO	7 (10), 2:51	Mar 20, 2008	HP Pavilion, San Jose, California, U.S.	
14	Win	14–0	Roger Cantrell	TKO	5 (10), 1:56	Nov 16, 2007	Beausejour Stadium, Gros Islet, Saint Lucia	
13	Win	13–0	Francisco Diaz	TKO	3 (8), 2:59	Jul 14, 2007	Home Depot Center, Carson, California, U.S.	
12	Win	12–0	Dhafir Smith	TKO	6 (8), 2:47	May 17, 2007	Tachi Palace Hotel & Casino, Lemoore, California, U.S.	
11	Win	11–0	Julio Jean	TKO	3 (8), 2:04	Mar 29, 2007	HP Pavilion, San Jose, California, U.S.	
10	Win	10–0	Derrick Findley	UD	6	Nov 16, 2006	HP Pavilion, San Jose, California, U.S.	
9	Win	9–0	Andy Kolle	RTD	6 (8), 3:00	Apr 29, 2006	Foxwoods Resort Casino, Ledyard, Connecticut, U.S.	
8	Win	8–0	Kendall Gould	UD	6	Feb 23, 2006	Tachi Palace Hotel & Casino, Lemoore, California, U.S.	
7	Win	7–0	Darnell Boone	UD	6	Nov 19, 2005	Rose Garden, Portland, Oregon, U.S.	
6	Win	6–0	Glenn LaPlante	KO	1 (6), 2:59	Oct 1, 2005	St. Pete Times Forum, Tampa, Florida, U.S.	
5	Win	5–0	Christopher Holt	RTD	3 (6), 3:00	Aug 18, 2005	HP Pavilion, San Jose, California, U.S.	
4	Win	4–0	Ben Aragon	TKO	3 (6), 0:59	Jun 18, 2005	FedExForum, Memphis, Tennessee, U.S.	
3	Win	3–0	Roy Ashworth	DQ	3 (6), 2:56	Apr 7, 2005	Pechanga Resort & Casino, Temecula, California, U.S.	Ashworth disqualified for hitting on the break
2	Win	2–0	Kenny Kost	UD	6	Feb 10, 2005	Palace Indian Gaming Center, Lemoore, California, U.S.	
1	Win	1–0	Chris Molina	TKO	2 (4), 0:40	Dec 18, 2004	Staples Center, Los Angeles, California, U.S.	

== Titles in boxing ==
=== Major world titles ===
- WBA (Super) super middleweight champion (168 lbs)
- WBC super middleweight champion (168 lbs)
- WBA (Super) light heavyweight champion (175 lbs)
- IBF light heavyweight champion (175 lbs)
- WBO light heavyweight champion (175 lbs)

=== The Ring magazine titles ===
- The Ring super middleweight champion (168 lbs)
- The Ring light heavyweight champion (175 lbs)

=== Regional/International titles ===
- WBO–NABO super middleweight champion (168 lbs) (2×)
- NABF super middleweight champion (168 lbs)
- WBO International light heavyweight champion (175 lbs)

=== Honorary titles ===
- WBC Emeritus champion

== Pay-per-view bouts ==
United States
No.	Date	Fight	Billing	Buys	Network
1	November 19, 2016	Kovalev vs. Ward	Pound for Pound	160,000	HBO
2	June 17, 2017	Ward vs. Kovalev II	The Rematch	125,000	HBO
		Total sales		285,000	

== Filmography ==
Films
Year	Film title	Role	Form
2015	Creed	Danny "Stuntman" Wheeler	
2018	Creed II	Danny "Stuntman" Wheeler	
2023	S.O.G.: The Book of Ward	Himself	Documentary

== Personal life ==
On September 6, 2025, Ward joined Sacramento State as the general manager (working alongside Urijah Faber) for Combat U, the first university-backed combat sports program in the country.

Sporting positions
Amateur boxing titles
Previous: Curtis Stevens	U.S. light heavyweight champion 2003	Next: Marcus Johnson
Regional boxing titles
Vacant Title last held by Jean Pascal	NABO super middleweight champion June 20, 2008 – November 2008; Vacated	Vacant Title next held by Andre Dirrell
Vacant Title last held by Andre Dirrell	NABO super middleweight champion February 6, 2009 – September 2009; Vacated	Vacant Title next held by Allan Green
Vacant Title last held by Peter Manfredo Jr.	NABF super middleweight champion February 6, 2009 – September 2009; Vacated	Vacant Title next held by Sébastien Demers
Vacant Title last held by Artur Beterbiev	WBO International light heavyweight champion August 6, 2016 – November 19, 2016; Won world title	Vacant Title next held by Umar Salamov
World boxing titles
Preceded by Mikkel Kessler	WBA super middleweight champion Super title November 21, 2009 – November 12, 2015; Vacated	Vacant Title next held by Fedor Chudinov
Preceded by Carl Froch	WBC super middleweight champion December 17, 2011 – April 11, 2013; Status changed	Vacant Title next held by Sakio Bika
Vacant Title last held by Joe Calzaghe	The Ring super middleweight champion December 17, 2011 – February 19, 2015; Stripped	Vacant Title next held by Callum Smith
Preceded by Sergey Kovalev	WBA light heavyweight champion Undisputed title November 19, 2016 – September 21, 2017; Retired	Title discontinued
Preceded by Sergey Kovalev	IBF light heavyweight champion November 19, 2016 – September 21, 2017; Retired	Vacant Title next held by Artur Beterbiev
Preceded by Sergey Kovalev	WBO light heavyweight champion November 19, 2016 – September 21, 2017; Retired	Vacant Title next held by Sergey Kovalev
Vacant Title last held by Adonis Stevenson	The Ring light heavyweight champion June 17, 2017 – September 21, 2017; Retired	Vacant
Awards
Previous: Sergio Martínez	The Ring Fighter of the Year; 2011	Next: Juan Manuel Márquez
Previous: Sergio Martínez	BWAA Fighter of the Year; 2011	Next: Nonito Donaire
Previous: Badou Jack	The Ring Comeback of the Year; 2016	Next: Sadam Ali
Achievements
Preceded by Román González	The Ring Pound for Pound #1 boxer March 21, 2017 – September 26, 2017; Retired	Succeeded by Gennady Golovkin
Honorary boxing titles
New title	WBC super middleweight champion In recess April 26 – May 15, 2012; Reinstated	Vacant Title next held by David Benavidez
