= Sergey Kovalev vs. Andre Ward =

Boxing match

Pound for Pound
- Date: November 19, 2016
- Venue: T-Mobile Arena, Paradise, Nevada, U.S.
- Title(s) on the line: WBA (Undisputed), IBF, and WBO light heavyweight titles

Tale of the tape
Boxer	Sergey Kovalev	Andre Ward
Nickname	"Krusher"	"S.O.G."
Hometown	Kopeysk, Chelyabinsk Oblast, Russia	Oakland, California, U.S.
Purse	$2,000,000	$5,000,000
Pre-fight record	30–0–1 (26 KO)	30–0 (15 KO)
Age	33 years, 7 months	32 years, 8 months
Height	6 ft 0 in (183 cm)	6 ft 0 in (183 cm)
Weight	175 lb (79 kg)	175 lb (79 kg)
Style	Orthodox	Orthodox
Recognition	WBA (Undisputed), IBF, and WBO; Light Heavyweight Champion; The Ring/TBRB; No. 1 Ranked Light Heavyweight; The Ring No. 2 ranked pound-for-pound fighter	IBF/WBO; No. 1 Ranked Light Heavyweight; WBA/TBRB; No. 2 Ranked Light Heavyweight; The Ring; No. 4 Ranked Light Heavyweight; The Ring No. 4 ranked pound-for-pound fighter Former unified super middleweight champion

Result
- Ward wins via 12-round unanimous decision (114-113, 114-113, 114-113)

Sergey Kovalev vs. Andre Ward, billed as Pound for Pound, was a professional boxing match contested on November 19, 2016, for the unified WBA (Undisputed), IBF and WBO light heavyweight championship. The bout was held at the T-Mobile Arena in Las Vegas, Nevada and was televised on HBO Pay-per-view. Ward won the fight by unanimous decision to take the titles.

== Background ==
Entering the fight, Kovalev, the unified light heavyweight champion, was ranked No. 2 in The Ring's pound-for-pound top 10 rankings and Ward, the former unified super middleweight champion, was ranked No. 4. In anticipation of the victor being acclaimed the sport's best pound-for-pound fighter, the promoters dubbed the fight simply "Pound for Pound."

This was just the third bout between two undefeated fighters rated in The Ring's pound-for-pound top 5 since the magazine began its pound-for-pound rankings in 1989. The previous two were 1990's Julio Cesar Chavez vs. Meldrick Taylor bout and 1999's matchup between Oscar De La Hoya and Felix Trinidad. The fight was announced in June, and both fighters retained their undefeated records through interim bouts. This event marked Ward's first time fighting in Las Vegas.

== The fight ==
Ward had a few rough opening rounds, and was knocked down in the second by a hard right from Kovalev. In the second half of the bout Ward would work his ward back into the bout, using his movement to circled the champion and pepper him with crisp shots. As Kovalev became fatigued, Ward was able to outscore the champion inside and prevent him from making use of his power. At the end of 12 rounds, Ward won a razer thin unanimous decision with all three judges scoring the fight 114-113 in his favor.

=== Final CompuBox numbers ===
En route to losing the unanimous decision, Kovalev threw and landed more punches than Ward:

Total	Kovalev	Ward
Thrown	474	337
Landed	126	116
Connect Percentage	26.6%	34.4%

== Aftermath ==
=== Post-fight reaction ===
Ward described his victory as "the most important and satisfying" of his career and argued, "The crowd, you could hear they thought I won." Despite being knocked down for just the second time in his career, Ward denied ever being hurt by Kovalev and felt his own effectiveness at midrange and on the inside "made all the difference" in the fight. He also stated his willingness to grant Kovalev a rematch. Virgil Hunter, Ward's trainer, contended Ward won because he "landed the cleaner punches" and Kovalev "was aggressive but not effective."

Kovalev denounced Ward's win as the "wrong decision" and suggested the three judges, all Americans, were biased in favor of Ward. Commentator Larry Merchant agreed, labeling it a "classic hometown decision." Kathy Duva, Kovalev's promoter, called it "a bad decision," criticized referee Robert Byrd for failing to control Ward's "wrestling" tactics, and vowed to exercise Kovalev's contractual right to an immediate rematch. Duva conceded that the fight was "close" and did not believe the nationality of the judges affected the outcome.

Thomas Hauser concurred with Duva's criticisms of Byrd and deemed "Byrd's refereeing ... more problematic than the judging." Viewing it "a difficult fight to score" with "a lot of close rounds," Hauser scored the fight 115-113 for Kovalev but found the 114-113 scores in Ward's favor "within the realm of reason."

George Willis of the New York Post praised the fight for living up to expectations, rejected claims the decision amounted to a "robbery," and noted that all three judges "had virtually the same scores...from the best seats in the house." Liam Happe of Yahoo! Sports echoed those sentiments, writing the fight was a "a thrilling war" in which boxing fans "got their money's worth" and that "it wasn't daylight robbery, at all" despite his personal scorecard favoring Kovalev by a point. Scott Christ of Bad Left Hook, who scored the fight 115-112 for Kovalev, considered it a "tough [fight] to score, with plenty of rounds that could have gone either way" and characterized it as a "debatable" decision rather than a "robbery."

In the aftermath of the fight, The Ring elevated Ward from No. 4 to No. 2 in its pound-for-pound rankings, behind No. 1 Roman "Chocolatito" Gonzalez, and dropped Kovalev one spot to No. 3. Ward also supplanted Kovalev as the magazine's No. 1 ranked light heavyweight, with Kovalev falling to No. 2.

=== Financial details ===
The champion Kovalev received a minimum purse of $2 million and stood to earn a percentage of the profits from his promoter, Main Events. The challenger Ward's purse was a career-high $5 million.

Kovalev–Ward was broadcast on HBO pay-per-view in the United States and generated 165,000 buys, a number seen as "disappointing" for a fight of its magnitude. It was the first appearance for either Kovalev or Ward headlining a pay-per-view bout and faced competition from the Manny Pacquiao vs. Jessie Vargas pay-per-view fight card earlier in November.

== Unofficial media scorecards ==
=== Editorial ===
- Associated Press: 116–111, Kovalev
- Las Vegas Review-Journal: 116–112, Kovalev
- ESPN: 115–112, Kovalev
- The Guardian: 115–112, Kovalev
- Boxing Monthly: 114–113, Kovalev
- Los Angeles Times: 114–113, Ward
- New York Post: 114–113, Ward
- The Ring: 114–113, Ward
- USA Today: 114–113, Ward
- Yahoo! Sports: 114–113, Ward

=== Journalists and commentators ===
- Harold Lederman, HBO Sports: 116–111, Kovalev
- Thomas Hauser, The Sweet Science: 115–113, Kovalev
- Stephen A. Smith, ESPN: 114–113 Kovalev
- Max Kellerman, HBO Sports: 114–113, Kovalev
- Tony Bellew, Sky Sports: 114–114
- Paulie Malignaggi, Sky Sports: 116–112, Ward
- Paul Smith, Sky Sports: 116–113, Ward
- Matthew Macklin, Sky Sports: 115–113, Ward
- Branson Wright, The Plain Dealer: 114–113, Ward
- Rick Evans, Boxingtalk.com: 114-113, Ward

== Fight card ==
Confirmed bouts:

- Light heavyweight: Sergey Kovalev vs. Andre Ward
- Light welterweight: Maurice Hooker vs. Darleys Pérez
- Light heavyweight: Oleksandr Gvozdyk vs. Isaac Chilemba
- Middleweight: Curtis Stevens vs. James de la Rosa

== International broadcasting ==
Country	Broadcaster
Albania	SuperSport
Argentina	Space
Australia	Main Event
Belgium	VOOsport
Canada	In Demand PPV
Canada	Canal Indigo PPV
Canada	Shaw PPV
Canada	Sportsnet PPV
Canada	Rogers PPV
Canada	MTS PPV
China	CCTV-5
Czech Republic	Sport1
Denmark	Viaplay PPV
Finland	Viaplay PPV
France	beIN Sports
Germany	DAZN
Honduras	Space
Hungary	Sport1
Iceland	Stöð 2 Sport
Indonesia	tvOne
Ireland	Sky Sports
Israel	Sport 2
Japan	WOWOW (Only for Video on demand members prior live broadcast)
Kazakhstan	Khabar
Malaysia	Astro SuperSport
Mexico	Televisa
New Zealand	Sky Sport
Nicaragua	Canal 4
Norway	Viaplay PPV
Panama	RPC-TV
Philippines	SKY PPV
Philippines	Cignal PPV
Poland	Polsat Sport
Portugal	Sport TV
Qatar	beIN Sports
Russia	Channel One
Serbia	Arena Sport
Singapore	Hub Sports
South Africa	SuperSport
Sweden	Viaplay PPV
Turkey	NTV Spor
United Arab Emirates	OSN Sports
United Kingdom	Sky Sports
United States	HBO PPV

== See also ==
- Andre Ward vs. Sergey Kovalev II

Preceded by vs. Isaac Chilemba	Sergey Kovalev's bouts June 6, 2017	Succeeded by Rematch
Preceded by vs. Alexander Brand	Andre Ward's bouts June 6, 2017	Succeeded by Rematch
