= Robin Sirwan Safar =

Kurdish-Swedish boxer (born 1992)

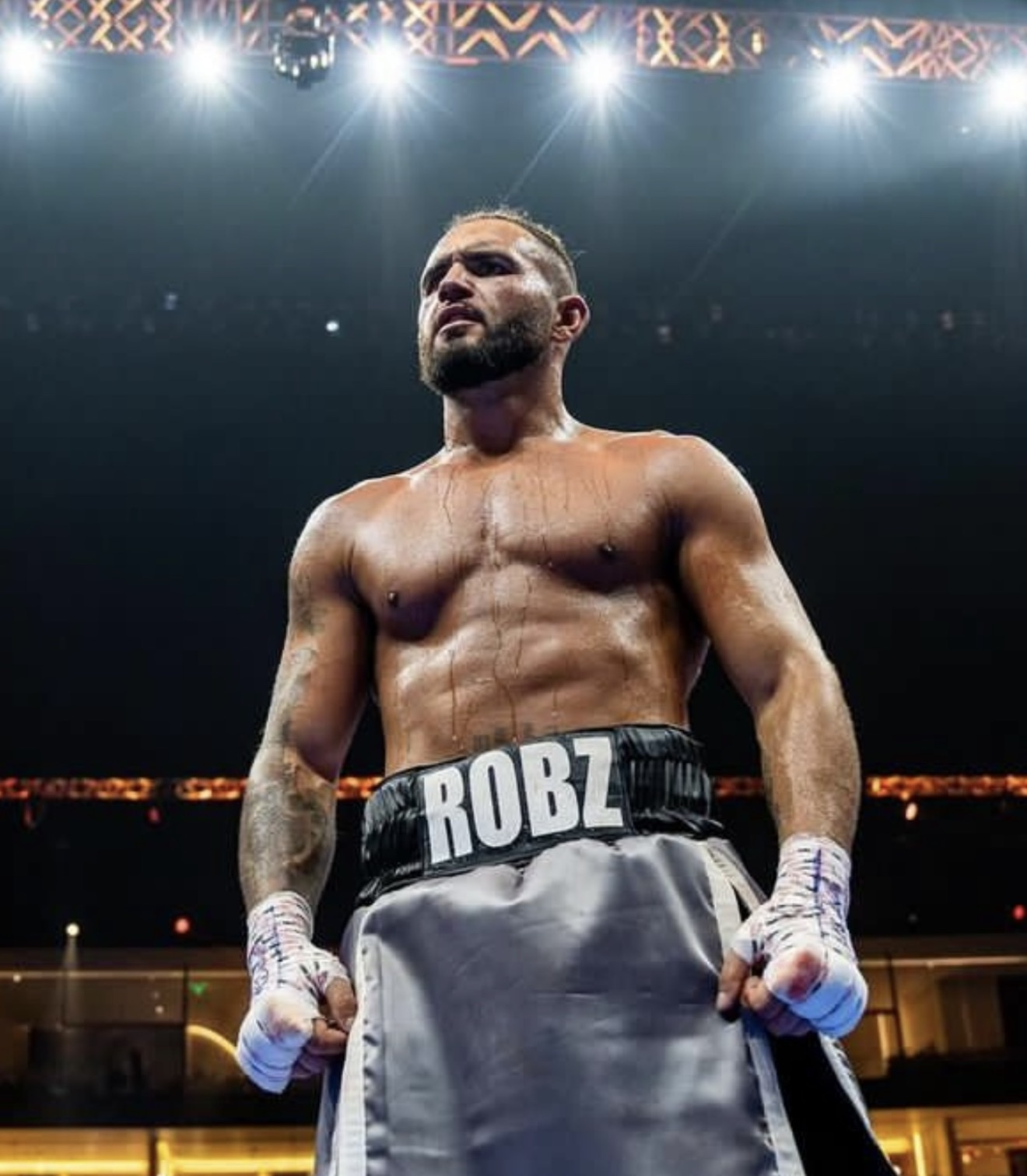

Personal information
- Nickname: ROBZ/The Answer
- Nationality: Swedish
- Born: November 30, 1992 (age 33) Visättra, Sweden
- Height: 6 ft 3 in (191 cm)
- Weight: Cruiserweight

Boxing career
- Stance: Orthodox

Boxing record
- Total fights: 20
- Wins: 20
- Win by KO: 13
- Losses: 0

Robin Sirwan Safar (born November 30, 1992) is a Kurdish-Swedish professional boxer ranked who competes in the cruiserweight division. As of 2025, he is ranked No. 9 in the world in his weight class. Safar has been based in Las Vegas, Nevada since 2018 and is currently signed with Golden Boy Promotions.

Known for his power, technical precision, and composure, Safar gained widespread recognition after a commanding victory over former world champion Sergey Kovalev.

== Professional career ==
The most notable win early in Safar's career was against tough Russian Denis Grachev, which he won by unanimous decision. Safar stopped American journeyman Demetrius Banks on the undercard of Steve Geffrard vs Denis Grachev in Delray Beach, Florida.

=== Safar vs. Kovalev ===
Safar's biggest fight to date has been against former light-heavyweight champion Sergey Kovalev on the undercard of Tyson Fury vs. Oleksandr Usyk on May 18, 2024, at the Kingdom Arena in Riyadh, Saudi Arabia. Safar scored a knockdown at the end of round 10 en route to a unanimous decision victory.

== Personal life ==
Safar's mother is Swedish and his father is Kurdish.

== Professional boxing record ==
20 fights	20 wins	0 losses
By knockout	13	0
By decision	7	0

No.	Result	Record	Opponent	Type	Round, time	Date	Location	Notes
20	Win	20-0	Yamil Peralta	SD	12	22 May 2026	SAP Center, San Jose, California, USA	Won WBC silver cruiserweight title
19	Win	19-0	(United States) Derick Miller Jr.	UD	10	8 Nov 2025	(United States) Dickies Arena, Fort Worth, Texas, USA	Won vacant WBA Continental Americas cruiserweight title
18	Win	18-0	(United States) Roberto Silva	TKO	5 (10), 2:55	29 Mar 2025	Poliforum Benito Juarez, Cancun, Mexico	
17	Win	17–0	(Russia) Sergey Kovalev	UD	10	18 May 2024	Kingdom Arena, Riyadh, Saudi Arabia	
16	Win	16–0	(United States) DeShon Webster	RTD	5 (8), 3:00	19 Apr 2023	(United States) Whitesands Events Center, Plant City, Florida	
15	Win	15–0	(United States) Antonio Brown	KO	1 (6), 1:12	19 Aug 2022	(United States) Commerce Casino, Commerce, California, USA	
14	Win	14–0	(United States) Chris Chatman	TKO	6 (8), 1:31	24 Nov 2021	(United States) The Dome at the Ballpark, Rosemont, Illinois, USA	
13	Win	13–0	(Russia) Denis Grachev	UD	8	10 Sep 2021	(United States) Tennis Center, Delray Beach, Florida, USA	
12	Win	12–0	(Mexico) Josue Obando	TKO	5 (8), 1:17	17 Jul 2021	(United States) Parkway Bank Sports Complex, Rosemont, Illinois, USA	
11	Win	11–0	(United States) Demetrius Banks	TKO	5 (8), 0:12	4 Mar 2021	(United States) Delray Beach Boxing Club, Delray Beach, Florida, USA	
10	Win	10–0	(United States) Quintell Thompson	TKO	1 (6), 2:21	7 Dec 2019	(United States) Showboat Hotel & Casino, Atlantic City, New Jersey, USA	
9	Win	9–0	(Mexico) Alfredo Contreras	TKO	1 (6), 2:03	20 Sep 2019	(United States) Commerce Casino, Commerce, California, USA	
8	Win	8–0	(Mexico) Israel Ornelas	KO	1 (6), 2:16	30 Mar 2019	Cheer's Bar, Tijuana, Baja California, Mexico	
7	Win	7–0	(Estonia) Gennadi Stserbin	TKO	4 (4)	1 Dec 2018	Kulturhuset Valhall, Skävde, Sweden	
6	Win	6–0	(Croatia) Josip Perkovic	UD	6	21 Apr 2018	Gärdehov, Sundsvall, Sweden	
5	Win	5–0	(Georgia (country)) Levani Lukhutashvili	UD	6	16 Dec 2017	En Arena, Stockholm, Sweden	
4	Win	4–0	(Czech Republic) Ondrej Budera	TKO	1 (4), 1:54	30 Sep 2017	Solnahallen, Solna, Sweden	
3	Win	3–0	(Serbia) Djorde Markovic	UD	4	9 Sep 2017	En Arena, Stockholm, Sweden	
2	Win	2–0	(Serbia) Vukasin Obradovic	TKO	3 (4), 2:25	10 Jun 2017	Harry's, Jönköping, Sweden	
1	Win	1–0	(Georgia (country)) Tristan Khizanishvili	TKO	1 (4), 2:46	8 Apr 2017	Haninge Boxing Gym, Haninge, Sweden	
