= Arif Magomedov =

Russian boxer

Personal information
- Nickname: The Predator
- Nationality: Russian
- Born: 4 August 1992 (age 34) Kizlyar, Russia
- Height: 1.78 m (5 ft 10 in)
- Weight: Middleweight

Boxing career
- Reach: 1.75 m (69 in)
- Stance: Orthodox

Boxing record
- Total fights: 21
- Wins: 18
- Win by KO: 11
- Losses: 3

Arif Magomedov (born 4 August 1992) is a Russian professional boxer.

== Professional boxing record ==
21 fights, 18 wins (11 knockouts), 3 losses (1 knockout)
No.	Result	Record	Opponent	Type	Round, time	Date	Location	Notes
21	Loss	18–3	(Georgia (country)) Lasha Gurguliani	UD	8	27 May 2018	(Russia) Event-Hall, Solnechnyy	
20	Loss	18–2	(United States) Luis Arias	TKO	5 (10), 1:16	17 Jun 2017	(United States) Mandalay Bay Hotel & Casino, Events Center, Las Vegas, Nevada	
19	Win	18–1	(Germany) Chris Herrmann	TKO	2 (10), 1:50	21 Nov 2016	(Russia) Korston Club, Moscow	
18	Loss	17–1	(United States) Andrew Hernandez	UD	10	21 May 2016	(United States) Las Vegas Event Center, Las Vegas, Nevada	For vacant WBC United States (USNBC) middleweight title.
17	Win	17–0	(Mexico) Jonathan Tavira	KO	7 (10) 0:55	12 Dec 2015	(United States) Civic Auditorium, Glendale, California	
16	Win	16–0	(United States) Derrick Webster	UD	10	17 Jul 2015	(United States) Sands Casino Resort, Bethlehem, Pennsylvania	Won vacant WBO NABO middleweight title.
15	Win	15–0	(United States) Darnell Boone	TKO	1 (8), 2:37	22 May 2015	(United States) The D Hotel & Casino, Las Vegas, Nevada	
14	Win	14–0	(United States) Derrick Findley	UD	8	02 Apr 2015	(United States) The Hangar, Costa Mesa, California	
13	Win	13–0	(Australia) Michael Zerafa	UD	10	24 Oct 2014	(Russia) Luzhniki Palace of Sports, Moscow	Won vacant WBO Youth & Asia Pacific middleweight title.
12	Win	12–0	(United Kingdom) Patrick Mendy	UD	12	09 Aug 2014	(Autonomous Republic of Crimea) Open-Air Bike Show, Sevastopol, Crimea	Won vacant WBA Inter-Continental middleweight title.
11	Win	11–0	(Colombia) Alex Theran	RTD	3 (10), 3:00	24 Apr 2014	(Russia) Dynamo Palace of Sports in Krylatskoye, Moscow	Won WBA Fedelatin middleweight title.
10	Win	10–0	(Bosnia and Herzegovina) Slavisa Simeunovic	TKO	1 (10), 1:34	23 Mar 2014	(Russia) Sports Palace "Znamya", Noginsk	
9	Win	9–0	(Ukraine) Volodymyr Borovskyy	UD	10	21 Mar 2014	(Russia) Sport Hall, Pervomayskoye	
8	Win	8–0	(Tanzania) Thomas Mashali	KO	2 (12), 1:07	16 Nov 2013	(Russia) Ivanhoe Country Club, Podolsk	Won vacant UBO InterContinental middleweight title.
7	Win	7–0	(Russia) Marat Khuzeev	KO	1 (10), 1:23	19 Oct 2013	(Russia) Culture Palace, Moskovsky, Moscow	Won vacant Russian middleweight title.
6	Win	6–0	(Russia) Karen Avetisyan	UD	8	24 Aug 2013	(Russia) Open Air Bike Show, Volgograd	
5	Win	5–0	(Colombia) Segundo Herrera	KO	3 (6), 1:44	17 May 2013	(Russia) Crocus City Hall, Myakinino	
4	Win	4–0	(Russia) Andrey Korzhenevsky	KO	2 (8), 0:29	20 Apr 2013	(Russia) Sport Service, Podolsk	
3	Win	3–0	(Russia) Andrey Polyakov	TKO	2 (6), 2:28	08 Mar 2013	(Russia) Krylia Sovetov, Moscow	
2	Win	2–0	(Russia) Sergey Sergeev	RTD	3 (6), 3:00	24 Feb 2013	(Russia) Sport Service, Podolsk	
1	Win	1–0	(Russia) Ruslan Sirazhev	SD	4	24 Jan 2013	(Russia) Vodoley, Ekaterinburg	
