= Cruiserweight (boxing) =

Weight class in boxing

Cruiserweight, also referred to as junior heavyweight, is a weight class in professional boxing between light heavyweight and heavyweight. Before the advent of the current cruiserweight class, "light heavyweight" and "cruiserweight" were sometimes used interchangeably in the United Kingdom.

== Professional boxing ==
The current weight limit for the division is 200 pounds (90.7 kg; 14 st 4.0 lb). When originally established, the weight limit was 190 pounds (86.2 kg; 13 st 8.0 lb). The division was established in order to accommodate smaller heavyweight boxers who could not compete with the growing size of boxers in that division. While many heavyweight champions (such as Rocky Marciano and Joe Louis) weighed around 190 pounds during their careers, during the 1970s it became fairly standard that fit heavyweight boxers weighed at least 210 pounds (95 kg; 15 st 0 lb). Many boxing authorities felt that asking men weighing between 176 pounds (80 kg; 12 st 8 lb) and 190 pounds (86 kg; 13 st 8 lb) to fight these larger men was unfair.

The North American Boxing Federation (NABF) was the first sanctioning body to recognize the cruiserweight division when it sanctioned a bout between Marvin Camel and Bill Sharkey for its version of the title on June 5, 1979. Camel won the match, which led to the World Boxing Council (WBC) sanctioning its first cruiserweight title fight between Marvin Camel and Mate Parlov on December 8, 1979. That fight was a draw, but in the rematch in March 1980 Camel won and became the first cruiserweight champion. In 1982 the World Boxing Association (WBA) recognized Ossie Ocasio as its first cruiserweight champion when he defeated South African Robbie Williams (although at that time the WBA called the division "junior heavyweight"). The International Boxing Federation followed suit in 1983 when it matched former WBC champion Marvin Camel against Rick Sekorski for its inaugural title. Camel won and became the first IBF cruiserweight champion.

Several boxers moved up to heavyweight after winning world titles at cruiserweight. Evander Holyfield unified the WBA, WBC, and IBF titles to become undisputed champion, the first to do so, and then moved up to the heavyweight division in 1988. In 2006, the second man to become undisputed champion was O’Neil Bell, who was later stripped of the IBF title. In November 2007, David Haye became WBA, WBC, The Ring and lineal cruiserweight champion by beating Jean-Marc Mormeck, David Haye then knocked out Enzo Maccarinelli in March 2008 to become the Unified WBA, WBC, WBO, The Ring and lineal Cruiserweight champion. He then moved up to Heavyweight and beat the tough Russian 'Giant' WBA champion Nikolay Valuev to become officially the second cruiserweight champion to win a heavyweight Title. Oleksandr Usyk became undisputed cruiserweight champion in 2018; he moved to heavyweight in 2019, becoming the undisputed champion in 2024.

Other notable champions in the division have been Bobby Czyz, Dwight Muhammad Qawi, Tomasz Adamek, Virgil Hill, Al Cole, Orlin Norris, James Toney, David Haye, Tony Bellew, Gilberto Ramirez, Jai Opetaia, David Benavidez, Noel Mikaelian, Chris Billam-Smith, Badou Jack, and Lawrence Okolie.

=== Current world champions ===
Sanctioning Body	Reign Began	Champion	Record	Defenses
WBA	May 2, 2026	David Benavidez	32–0 (26 KO)	0
WBC	September 14, 2026	Michał Cieślak	28–2–0–1 (22 KO)	0
IBF		vacant		
WBO	May 2, 2026	David Benavidez	32–0 (26 KO)	0

=== Current world rankings ===
==== The Ring ====
As of September 13, 2026.

Keys:

C Current The Ring world champion

Rank	Name	Record (W–L–D)	Title(s)
C	Jai Opetaia	31–0 (24 KO)	WBA (Regular)
1	David Benavidez	32–0 (26 KO)	WBA, WBO
2	Gilberto Ramírez	48–2 (30 KO)	
3	Chris Billam-Smith	22–2 (14 KO)	
4	Michał Cieślak	28–2 (1) (22 KO)	WBC
5	Noel Mikaelian	28–3 (12 KO)	
6	Badou Jack	29–4–3 (17 KO)	
7	Viddal Riley	14–0 (7 KO)	
8	Ryan Rozicki	21–2–1 (20 KO)	
9	Leonardo Mosquea	18–0 (11 KO)	
10	Robin Sirwan Safar	20–0 (13 KO)	

==== BoxRec ====
As of July 2, 2026.

Rank	Name	Record (W–L–D)	Title(s)
1	David Benavidez	32–0 (26 KO)	WBA, WBO
2	Jai Opetaia	30–0 (23 KO)	The Ring
3	Gilberto Ramirez	48–2 (30 KO)	
4	Chris Billam-Smith	22–2 (14 KO)	
5	Umar Salamov	32–2 (24 KO)	
6	Viddal Riley	14–0 (7 KO)	
7	Noel Mikaelian	28–3 (12 KO)	WBC
8	Mike Perez	32–3–1 (1) (22 KO)	
9	Robin Sirwan Safar	20–0 (13 KO)	
10	Cheavon Clarke	14–2 (9 KO)	

=== Longest reigning world cruiserweight champions ===
Below is a list of longest reigning cruiserweight champions in boxing measured by the individual's longest reign. Career total time as champion (for multiple time champions) does not apply.

	Name	Title reign	Title recognition	Successful defenses	Fights
1.	Johnny Nelson	6 years, 5 months, 26 days	WBO	13	
2.	Marco Huck	5 years, 11 months, 17 days	WBO	13	
3.	Arsen Goulamirian	4 years, 9 month, 28 days	WBA	4	
4.	Krzysztof Włodarczyk	4 years, 4 months, 12 days	WBC	6	
5.	Denis Lebedev	4 years, 1 month, 3 days	WBA, IBF	5	
6.	Guillermo Jones	4 years, 1 month, 3 days	WBA	2	
7.	Juan Carlos Gómez	3 years, 11 months, 29 days	WBC	10	
8.	Anaclet Wamba	3 years, 11 months, 17 days	WBC	7	
9.	Yoan Pablo Hernández	3 years, 11 months, 2 weeks and 5 days	IBF	4	
10.	Vassiliy Jirov	3 years, 10 months, 21 days	IBF	5	
11.	Jean-Marc Mormeck	3 years, 10 months, 15 days	WBA, WBC	4	
12.	Ilunga Makabu	3 years. 28 days	WBC	2	
13.	Ossie Ocasio	2 years, 9 months, 18 days	WBA	3	
14.	Oleksandr Usyk	2 years, 8 months, 29 days	WBA, WBC, IBF, WBO	6	
15.	Lawrence Okolie	2 years, 2 months, 7 days	WBO	3	
16.	Evander Holyfield	2 years	WBA, WBC, IBF	5	

Active reign
Reign has ended

== Kickboxing ==
In kickboxing, a cruiserweight fighter generally weighs between 82 kg (181 lb) and 88 kg (195 lb). However, some governing bodies have slightly different classes. The International Kickboxing Federation (IKF) Cruiserweight (professional and amateur) division is 186.1 lb–195 lb or 84.6 kg–88.6 kg.

== Bare-knuckle boxing ==
The limit of cruiserweight generally differs among promotions in bare-knuckle boxing:

- In Bare Knuckle Fighting Championship, the cruiserweight division has an upper limit of 205 lb (93 kg).
- The cruiserweight division has an upper limit of 102 kg (225 lb).
