= Roc Nation Sports =

Sports management company

- Type: Sports management company
- Industry: Management
- Founded: 2013
- Founder: Jay-Z
- Headquarters: New York City, U.S.
- Area served: Worldwide
- Key people: Juan Perez (President)
- Parent: Roc Nation
- Website: Official website

Roc Nation Sports is the sports management division of Roc Nation.

== History ==
Roc Nation Sports was founded by Jay-Z in partnership with Creative Artists Agency, a prominent talent agency based in Los Angeles. Roc Nation Sports provides services for professional athletes and is a division of the parent company Roc Nation, which provides representation for celebrities throughout the entertainment industry. In 2013, after selling his stake as part-owner of the NBA’s Brooklyn Nets, Jay-Z expanded Roc Nation by adding its sports management division, which signed New York Yankees All-Star second baseman Robinson Canó as its first major client.

Roc Nation Sports has also signed New York Giants receiver Victor Cruz and WNBA prospect Skylar Diggins-Smith to Roc Nation Sports. On June 20, 2013 it was revealed that Jay-Z was officially certified as a sports agent for the National Basketball Association and Major League Baseball. On June 24, 2013, Roc Nation Sports signed Kevin Durant of the NBA’s Oklahoma City Thunder as a new client.

On May 1, 2014 Roc Nation Sports added James Young of the Kentucky Wildcats. In November 2014, Dallas Cowboys wide receiver Dez Bryant would also join the company. On January 3, 2018, it was announced that Penn State running back Saquon Barkley had signed with Roc Nation Sports prior to entering the 2018 NFL draft.

As of July 2025, Roc Nation Sports had also signed the WNBA's Skylar Diggins, LaMelo Ball of the NBA's Charlotte Hornets, and Brazilian soccer player Vini Jr.

Roc Nation Sports currently boasts a roster with over 100 athletes across baseball, basketball, American football, soccer, rugby, and e-sports. The company also has a broadcasting division.

Forbes ranked Roc Nation Sports number seven on its list of the Top 10 most valuable sports agencies for 2025.

== Clients ==
American Football

- Jaire Alexander
- Saquon Barkley
- Dez Bryant
- Gabe Davis
- Leonard Fournette
- Todd Gurley
- C.J. Henderson
- Nick Kwiatkoski
- Bryce Love
- Julian Okwara
- Romeo Okwara
- Brandon Smith
- JuJu Smith-Schuster
- Ronnie Stanley
- Ndamukong Suh
- Andrew Thomas

Association football

- Xavier Amaechi
- Luca Ashby-Hammond
- Taye Ashby-Hammond
- Eric Bailly
- Samuel Chukwueze
- Vontae Daley-Campbell
- Kevin De Bruyne
- Federico Dimarco
- Yan Diomande
- Endrick
- Nathan Ferguson
- Lauren James
- Reece James
- Tyreece John-Jules
- Tyrone Mings
- Jordan Lukaku
- Romelu Lukaku
- Brooke Norton-Cuffy
- Marcus Rashford
- Vinicius Junior
- Axel Witsel
- Marc Bernal

Baseball

- CJ Abrams
- Stephen Alemais
- Erick Aybar
- Patrick Bailey
- Robinson Canó
- Rusney Castillo
- Yoenis Céspedes
- Jazz Chisholm Jr.
- DeMarcus Evans
- Jeremy Jeffress
- Jason Martin
- Max Meyer
- Shelby Miller
- Jacob Nottingham
- D. J. Peterson
- Dustin Peterson
- Eddie Rosario
- CC Sabathia
- Mike Shawaryn
- Braden Shipley
- Dominic Smith
- Marcus Wilson
- Masyn Winn

Basketball

- Precious Achiuwa
- Al-Farouq Aminu
- D. J. Augustin
- LaMelo Ball
- LiAngelo Ball
- Chris Boucher
- Trey Burke
- Zylan Cheatham
- Skylar Diggins
- Tyson Etienne
- Markelle Fultz
- Rudy Gay
- Danny Green
- Quade Green
- Ron Harper Jr.
- Danuel House
- Kyrie Irving
- Caris LeVert
- Patrick McCaw
- Jabari Parker
- Kevin Porter Jr.
- Immanuel Quickley
- Jahmi'us Ramsey
- Quinton Rose
- Isaiah Stewart
- P. J. Washington
- Justise Winslow
- James Young

Cricket

- Lungi Ngidi
- Temba Bavuma

Netball

- Bongiwe Msomi

Personalities

- Tony Allen
- Caron Butler
- Victor Cruz
- Zach Randolph
- Jalen Rose
- Kenny Smith
- Michael Vick

Rugby Union

- Cheslin Kolbe
- Siya Kolisi
- Maro Itoje
- Tendai Mtawarira
- Sbu Nkosi
- Aphelele Fassi
- Ardie Savea
