= List of African Boxing Union champions =

The following is a list of African Boxing Union champions. The African Boxing Union (ABU) is a professional boxing governing body that sanctions championship bouts in Africa.

== Heavyweight ==
As of 9 December 2017

List of ABU heavyweight champions.
Name	Date of title victory	Successful defences	Nationality
Ngozika Ekwelum	5 October 1979	0	(Nigeria) Nigerian
Adama Mensah	1 January 1982	0	(Ghana) Ghanaian
Proud Kilimanjaro	4 September 1982	6	(Zimbabwe) Zimbabwean
Michael Simuwelu	29 August 1987	0	(Zambia) Zambian
Proud Kilimanjaro	8 August 1988	0	(Zimbabwe) Zimbabwean
Bash Ali	31 July 1993	0	(Nigeria) Nigerian
Joseph Akhasamba	19 December 1998	1	(Kenya) Kenyan
Manuel Ossie	26 August 2005	0	(Liberia) Liberian
Frank Frimpong	17 November 2006	0	(Ghana) Ghanaian
Joseph Chingangu	1 March 2008	2	(Zambia) Zambian
Zack Mwekassa	28 June 2014	0	(Democratic Republic of the Congo) Congolese
Ruann Visser	31 March 2017	1	(South Africa) South African
Tshibuabua Kalonga	9 December 2017	1	(Democratic Republic of the Congo) Congolese

== Cruiserweight ==
As of 28 May 2021

List of ABU cruiserweight champions.
Name	Date of title victory	Successful defences	Nationality
Moyoyo Mensah	8 February 2002	0	(Ghana) Ghanaian
Faïsal Ibnel Arrami	17 October 2009	0	(France) French
Thabiso Mchunu	10 November 2012	0	(South Africa) South African
Taylor Mabika	27 December 2013	1	(Gabon) Gabonese
Thabiso Mchunu	10 June 2017	0	(South Africa) South African
Thomas Oosthuizen	1 September 2018	0	(South Africa) South African
Thabiso Mchunu	8 December 2018	0	(South Africa) South African
Olanrewaju Durodola	1 February 2020	2	(Nigeria) Nigerian

== Light-heavyweight ==
As of 28 April 2017

List of ABU light-heavyweight champions.
Name	Date of title victory	Successful defences	Nationality
Ba Sounkalo	18 September 1974	4	(Mali) Malian
Lottie Mwale	30 September 1979	5	(Zambia) Zambian
Joe Lasisi	25 April 1986	1	(Nigeria) Nigerian
Ali Saidi	7 November 1992	0	(Tunisia) Tunisian
Chipundu Chipayeni	25 June 1995	0	(Zambia) Zambian
Joe Lasisi	29 November 1996	0	(Nigeria) Nigerian
Braimah Kamoko	1 April 2005	1	(Ghana) Ghanaian
Zach Walters	23 February 2008	0	(United States) American (Note: Walters was born in Madagascar to American parents.)
Charles Chisamba	24 January 2009	0	(Zambia) Zambian
Doudou Ngumbu	10 July 2009	0	(France) French (Note: Ngumbu was born in the Democratic Republic of the Congo.)
Isaac Chilemba	31 October 2009	0	(Malawi) Malawian
Doudou Ngumbu	15 April 2011	0	(France) French
Hany Atiyo	14 October 2011	0	(Egypt) Egyptian
Joseph Lubega	6 April 2012	0	(Uganda) Ugandan
Daniel Wanyonyi	28 June 2014	0	(Kenya) Kenyan
Thomas Oosthuizen	28 April 2017	0	(South Africa) South African

== Super-middleweight ==
As of 1 December 2018

List of ABU super-middleweight champions.
Name	Date of title victory	Successful defences	Nationality
Thulani Malinga	14 August 1994	0	(South Africa) South African
Bertrand Tchandjeu	29 November 1996	0	(Cameroon) Cameroonian
Joseph Marwa	9 August 1998	0	(Tanzania) Tanzanian
Bawa Adime	31 August 1998	0	(Ghana) Ghanaian
Bertrand Tchandjeu	4 December 1998	0	(Cameroon) Cameroonian
Mohamed Dridi	19 August 2000	1	(Tunisia) Tunisian
Charles Adamu	28 December 2002	0	(Ghana) Ghanaian
Isaac Chilemba	13 September 2008	0	(Malawi) Malawian
Flash Issaka	26 December 2009	0	(Ghana) Ghanaian
Farouk Daku	14 June 2015	0	(Netherlands) Dutch (Note: Daku was born in Uganda.)
Ryno Liebenberg	1 September 2018	0	(South Africa) South African

== Middleweight ==
As of 8 June 2019

List of ABU middleweight champions.
Name	Date of title victory	Successful defences	Nationality
Shako Mamba	6 August 1974	0	(Luxembourg) Luxembourgish (Note: Mamba was born in the Democratic Republic of the Congo.)
Idrissa Konate	7 February 1976	0	(Senegal) Senegalese
Shako Mamba	23 December 1976	0	(Luxembourg) Luxembourgish
Richard Ofosu	30 April 1977	1	(Ghana) Ghanaian
Jean-Marie Emebe	9 November 1979	0	(France) French (Note: Emebe was born in Cameroon.)
Olton Beltchika	5 March 1983	0	(Democratic Republic of the Congo) Congolese
Abdul Umaru Sanda	8 September 1984	1	(Ghana) Ghanaian
Peter Assandoh	6 March 1987	0	(Ghana) Ghanaian
Abdul Umaru Sanda	13 February 1988	0	(Ghana) Ghanaian
Hunter Clay	28 October 1988	3	(Nigeria) Nigerian
Tejumola Oduntoye	29 July 1994	0	(Nigeria) Nigerian
Georges Boco	5 May 1995	0	(Benin) Beninese
Ambrose Mlilo	24 June 1995	0	(Democratic Republic of the Congo) Congolese
Georges Boco	15 May 1996	1	(Benin) Beninese
Anthony van Kiekerk	25 June 2000	0	(South Africa) South African
James Obede Toney	12 October 2001	0	(Ghana) Ghanaian
Osumanu Adama	29 October 2004	0	(Ghana) Ghanaian
Mohammed Akrong	2 August 2008	1	(Ghana) Ghanaian
Osumanu Adama	26 December 2009	0	(Ghana) Ghanaian
Khalid Habchane	2 May 2014	0	(Morocco) Moroccan

== Super-welterweight ==
As of 13 May 2016

List of ABU super-welterweight champions.
Name	Date of title victory	Successful defences	Nationality
Sea Robinson	30 May 1974	0	(Ivory Coast) Ivorian
Loucif Hamani	4 December 1976	1	(Algeria) Algerian
Jean-Marie Emebe	5 November 1977	0	(France) French
Olton Beltchika	30 June 1983	0	(Democratic Republic of the Congo) Congolese
Kitenge Kitengewa	2 July 1989	0	(Luxembourg) Luxembourgish (Note: Kitenge was born in the Democratic Republic of the Congo.)
Jaffa Ballogou	29 December 1990	1	(Togo) Togolese
Rashid Matumla	30 March 1997	0	(Tanzania) Tanzanian
Cyprian Emeti	30 October 1999	0	(Nigeria) Nigerian
Ruben Groenewald	24 October 2000	0	(South Africa) South African
Adam Katumwa	22 December 2002	2	(Uganda) Ugandan
Badru Lusambya	19 June 2004	2	(Uganda) Ugandan
Badru Lusambya	18 October 2009	0	(Uganda) Ugandan
Ahmed Benjeddou	10 March 2012	0	(Morocco) Moroccan
Salim Larbi	6 December 2013	0	(France) French (Note: Larbi is of Algerian descent.)
Mbiya Kanku	13 May 2016	0	(Democratic Republic of the Congo) Congolese

== Welterweight ==
As of 20 July 2017

List of ABU welterweight champions.
Name	Date of title victory	Successful defences	Nationality
Joseph Bessala	30 November 1974	0	(Cameroon) Cameroonian
Salem Ouedraogo	31 January 1976	0	(Ivory Coast) Ivorian
Mimoun Mohatar	4 February 1978	0	(Spain) Spanish (Note: Mohatar was born in Morocco.)
Joseph Bessala	23 June 1978	0	(Cameroon) Cameroonian
Mimoun Mohatar	23 December 1978	1	(Spain) Spanish
Judas Clottey	24 June 1983	1	(Ghana) Ghanaian
Charles Nwokolo	27 June 1986	1	(Nigeria) Nigerian
Tubor Briggs	9 March 1990	2	(Nigeria) Nigerian
Napoleon Alabi	30 October 1999	0	(Ghana) Ghanaian
Joshua Clottey	27 April 2001	0	(Ghana) Ghanaian
Karim Harzouz	8 June 2001	0	(France) French
Fatai Onikeke	5 March 2004	0	(Australia) Australian (Note: Onikeke was born in Nigeria.)
Hassan Saku	22 December 2007	0	(Sweden) Swedish (Note: Saku was born in Uganda.)
Chris van Heerden	25 July 2008	1	(South Africa) South African
Pythius Kambembe	3 July 2010	0	(Zambia) Zambian
Ismael El Massoudi	4 December 2010	0	(France) French (Note: El Massoudi was born in Morocco.)
Patrice Sou Toke	13 October 2012	0	(Burkina Faso) Burkinabé
Charles Manyuchi	28 June 2013	1	(Zimbabwe) Zimbabwean
Larry Ekundayo	30 October 2015	0	(Nigeria) Nigerian
Thulani Mbenge	1 December 2016	0	(South Africa) South African
Stanley Eribo	26 December 2016	1	(Nigeria) Nigerian
Salehe Mkalekwa	20 April 2018	0	(Tanzania) Tanzanian
Eric Kapia	25 August 2018	0	(Democratic Republic of the Congo) Congolese
Freddy Kiwitt	20 July 2019	0	(Liberia) Liberian (Note: Kiwitt was born in Liberia to a German father and a Liberian mother.)
Thulani Mbenge	17 October 2020	0	(South Africa) South African

== Super-lightweight ==
As of 20 October 2018

List of ABU super-lightweight champions.
Name	Date of title victory	Successful defences	Nationality
Jo Kimpuani	28 June 1975	0	(France) French (Note: Kimpuani was born in the Democratic Republic of the Congo.)
Obisia Nwankpa	4 May 1979	0	(Nigeria) Nigerian
Billy Famous	17 February 1984	1	(Nigeria) Nigerian
Dave Chibuye	1 July 1989	0	(Zambia) Zambian
Valery Kayumba	2 July 1989	0	(France) French (Note: Kayumba was born in the Democratic Republic of the Congo.)
Ike Quartey	15 December 1990	1	(Ghana) Ghanaian
Habib Mahjoub	6 November 1993	0	(Tunisia) Tunisian
Duke Chinyadza	29 October 1994	0	(Zimbabwe) Zimbabwean
Felix Bwalya	25 June 1995	0	(Zambia) Zambian
Karim Ben-Sultan	20 July 1995	0	(Algeria) Algerian
Nasser Athumani	19 December 1998	0	(Kenya) Kenyan
Justin Juuko	31 December 1999	0	(Uganda) Ugandan
Stephanus Carr	24 October 2000	1	(South Africa) South African
Davis Lusimbo	7 July 2002	0	(Uganda) Ugandan
Victor Kpadenou	12 April 2003	0	(Benin) Beninese
Ajose Olusegun	10 April 2004	0	(Nigeria) Nigerian
Emmanuel Lartei Lartey	4 August 2007	0	(Ghana) Ghanaian
Albert Mensah	2 August 2008	1	(Ghana) Ghanaian
Solomon Bogere	16 November 2013	0	(Uganda) Ugandan
Mohamed El Marcouchi	8 April 2017	0	(Belgium) Belgian (Note: El Marcouchi is of Moroccan descent.)
Olaide Fijabi	26 December 2017	0	(Nigeria) Nigerian
Abderrazak Houya	20 October 2018	0	(France) French (Note: Houya was born in Algeria.)

== Lightweight ==
As of 21 April 2019

List of ABU lightweight champions.
Name	Date of title victory	Successful defences	Nationality
Ould Makloufi	15 December 1973	1	(Algeria) Algerian
Aziza Bossou	29 April 1978	1	(Togo) Togolese
John Sichula	2 September 1982	0	(Zambia) Zambian
Davidson Andeh	29 April 1983	0	(Nigeria) Nigerian
Sam Ago Kotey	6 November 1984	0	(Ghana) Ghanaian
Akwei Addo	13 February 1988	1	(Ghana) Ghanaian
Christopher Ossai	31 January 1992	1	(Nigeria) Nigerian
David Tetteh	4 December 1993	0	(Ghana) Ghanaian
Chikoya Mphande	24 June 1995	0	(Malawi) Malawian
Ben Tackie	22 December 1995	1	(Ghana) Ghanaian
Charles Owiso	31 December 1999	0	(Kenya) Kenyan
Abdullai Amidu	28 June 2003	0	(Ghana) Ghanaian
Joshua Allotey	3 December 2005	1	(Ghana) Ghanaian
Sam Rukundo	24 November 2007	1	(Sweden) Swedish (Note: Rukundo was born in Uganda.)
George Ashie	14 April 2012	0	(Ghana) Ghanaian
Keith Nkosi	3 December 2012	0	(South Africa) South African
Richard Commey	26 December 2013	0	(Ghana) Ghanaian
Hedi Slimani	11 November 2015	0	(Tunisia) Tunisian
Patrick Kinigamazi	18 November 2016	0	(Rwanda) Rwandan
Lunga Stimela	26 May 2017	0	(South Africa) South African
Oto Joseph	26 Dec 2017	2	(Nigeria) Nigerian

== Super-featherweight ==
As of 18 May 2018

List of ABU super-featherweight champions.
Name	Date of title victory	Successful defences	Nationality
Safiu Okebadan	14 December 1982	0	(Nigeria) Nigerian
John Sichula	3 September 1983	0	(Zambia) Zambian
Sam Akromah	26 October 1986	0	(Ghana) Ghanaian
Aristide Sagbo	15 February 1991	0	(Benin) Beninese
Simon Peter McIntosh	27 September 1991	0	(Nigeria) Nigerian
Aristide Sagbo	29 May 1992	0	(Benin) Beninese
Joe Orewa	10 September 1993	0	(Nigeria) Nigerian
Michelle Dahmani	6 November 1993	0	(Tunisia) Tunisian
Aristide Sagbo	11 November 1994	5	(Benin) Beninese
Tony Danso	22 December 1999	0	(Ghana) Ghanaian
Francis Kiwanuka	31 December 1999	0	(Uganda) Ugandan
Michael Kizza	7 July 2002	0	(Uganda) Ugandan
Joshua Allotey	12 April 2003	0	(Ghana) Ghanaian
Anges Adjaho	10 September 2004	0	(Benin) Beninese
Yakubu Amidu	23 December 2006	0	(Ghana) Ghanaian
Jasper Seroka	25 July 2008	0	(South Africa) South African
George Ashie	26 December 2009	0	(Ghana) Ghanaian
Jasper Seroka	18 March 2013	0	(South Africa) South African
Koos Sibiya	27 May 2016	0	(South Africa) South African
Sibusiso Zingange	8 December 2016	0	(South Africa) South African
Koos Sibiya	28 April 2017	0	(South Africa) South African
Sibusiso Zingange	18 May 2018	0	(South Africa) South African

== Featherweight ==
As of 7 December 2019

List of ABU featherweight champions.
Name	Date of title victory	Successful defences	Nationality
David Kotei	2 February 1974	0	(Ghana) Ghanaian
David Kotei	30 July 1977	0	(Ghana) Ghanaian
Azumah Nelson	13 December 1980	0	(Ghana) Ghanaian
Modesty Napunyi	28 January 1990	0	(Kenya) Kenyan
Percy Commey	1 August 1990	0	(Ghana) Ghanaian
Stanford Ngcebeshe	24 January 1993	0	(South Africa) South African
Dramane Nabaloum	28 January 1994	2	(Burkina Faso) Burkinabé
James Armah	1 November 1997	0	(Ghana) Ghanaian
Anthony Tshehla	4 March 2001	0	(South Africa) South African
Abdul Malik Jabir	6 March 2003	0	(Ghana) Ghanaian
Jackson Asiku	18 June 2005	0	(Australia) Australian (Note: Asiku was born in Uganda.)
Justin Savi	24 November 2012	0	(Benin) Beninese
Edward Kakembo	26 December 2015	0	(Uganda) Ugandan
Waidi Usman	14 April 2018	0	(Nigeria) Nigerian
Nathaniel Kakololo	10 August 2019 (Note: Kakololo's title win on 10 August is not officially recorded on Boxrec.)	1	(Namibia) Namibian

== Super-bantamweight ==
As of 15 September 2019

List of ABU super-bantamweight champions.
Name	Date of title victory	Successful defences	Nationality
Modesty Napunyi	2 May 1983	0	(Kenya) Kenyan
Modesty Napunyi	1 July 1984	0	(Kenya) Kenyan
Augustin Sia	29 November 1996	1	(Ivory Coast) Ivorian
Ablorh Sowah	6 September 1997	2	(Ghana) Ghanaian
Rogers Mtagwa	31 December 1999	0	(Tanzania) Tanzanian
Vuyani Phulo	10 December 2000	1	(South Africa) South African
Abdul Tebazalwa	31 July 2004	1	(Sweden) Swedish (Note: Tebazalwa was born in Uganda.)
Sande Kizito	9 October 2006	0	(Uganda) Ugandan
Sande Otieno	2 December 2006	0	(Kenya) Kenyan
Alexis Boureima Kabore	14 October 2011	2	(Burkina Faso) Burkinabé
Lodumo Lamati	9 December 2016	0	(South Africa) South African
Tony Rashid	15 September 2019	0	(Tanzania) Tanzanian

== Bantamweight ==
As of 24 August 2019

List of ABU bantamweight champions.
Name	Date of title victory	Successful defences	Nationality
Sulley Shittu	10 September 1974	0	(Ghana) Ghanaian
Stix Macloud	3 July 1982	0	(Zimbabwe) Zimbabwean
Eric Boone	6 August 1982	0	(Nigeria) Nigerian
Francis Musankabala	5 November 1983	0	(Zambia) Zambian
Francis Musankabala	3 June 1986	0	(Zambia) Zambian
Ernest Koffi	8 July 1988	0	(Ivory Coast) Ivorian
Nana Konadu	10 December 1988	0	(Ghana) Ghanaian
Victor Enyika	22 December 1989	2	(Nigeria) Nigerian
Rufus Adebayo	1 October 1993	0	(Nigeria) Nigerian
Ernest Koffi	23 December 1994	2	(Ivory Coast) Ivorian
Steve Dotse	1 November 1997	0	(Ghana) Ghanaian
Joseph Agbeko	5 May 2000	1	(Ghana) Ghanaian
Friday Fatunji Felix	15 December 2002	1	(Nigeria) Nigerian
Ibrahim Adewale	21 May 2006	1	(Nigeria) Nigerian
Nick Otieno	22 November 2008	0	(Kenya) Kenyan
Kennedy Kanyanta	28 November 2009	1	(Zambia) Zambian
Mohamed Metwaly	6 April 2012	1	(Egypt) Egyptian
Ronald Malindi	28 April 2017	1	(South Africa) South African
Prince Patel	24 August 2019	0	(United Kingdom) British (Note: Patel is of Indian descent.)

== Super-flyweight ==
As of 16 December 2019

List of ABU super-flyweight champions.
Name	Date of title victory	Successful defences	Nationality
Vuyani Nene	29 January 1995	0	(South Africa) South African
Abbey Mnisi	24 October 2000	0	(South Africa) South African
Simphiwe Khandisa	12 December 2001	0	(South Africa) South African
Francis Miyeyusho	26 January 2008	0	(Tanzania) Tanzanian
Lesley Sekotswe	25 July 2008	1	(Botswana) Motswana
Landi Ngxeke	16 December 2019	0	(South Africa) South African

== Flyweight ==
As of 30 December 2017

List of ABU flyweight champions.
Name	Date of title victory	Successful defences	Nationality
Stephen Muchoki	2 October 1983	1	(Kenya) Kenyan
Nana Konadu	13 December 1986	0	(Ghana) Ghanaian
Michael Ebo Danquah	26 November 1988	0	(Ghana) Ghanaian
Alex Baba	25 November 1995	0	(Ghana) Ghanaian
Bashiru Thompson	25 July 2008	1	(Nigeria) Nigerian
Alfred Muwowo	2 July 2017	1	(Zambia) Zambian

== Light-flyweight ==
As of 21 October 2018

List of ABU light-flyweight champions.
Name	Date of title victory	Successful defences	Nationality
James Njorage	1 Jun 1985	0	(Kenya) Kenyan
Michael Ebo Danquah	30 May 1987	0	(Ghana) Ghanaian
Sivenathi Nontshinga	21 October 2018	0	(South Africa) South African

== Minimumweight ==
As of 29 July 2018

List of ABU minimumweight champions.
Name	Date of title victory	Successful defences	Nationality
Mtutuzeli Nene	29 January 1995	0	(South Africa) South African
Sithembile Kibiti	27 April 2002	0	(South Africa) South African
Ayanda Ndulani	29 July 2018	0	(South Africa) South African
