= Vikapita Meroro =

Namibian boxer (born 1985)

Personal information
- Nickname: Beast Master
- Nationality: (Namibia) Namibian
- Born: Vikapita Meroro; 16 April 1985 (age 41) Otjinene, Namibia
- Height: 185 cm (6 ft 1 in)
- Weight: cruiserweight

Boxing career
- Reach: 186
- Stance: Orthodox

Boxing record
- Total fights: 48
- Wins: 30
- Win by KO: 15
- Losses: 18

Vikapita Meroro (born 16 April 1985 in Otjinene) is a Namibian professional boxer. He is a heavyweight boxer and has fought for the WBC Youth World super middleweight title.

Meroro began his first fighting experience with professionals. He beat Elijah Kwenaetsile with a points victory.

He encountered Ukrainian Stanislav Kashtanov for the WBC Youth World super middleweight title and lost in Kashtanov's homeland and home city Donetsk, Ukraine.

== Professional boxing record ==
48 fights	30 wins	18 losses
By knockout	15	11
By decision	14	7
By disqualification	1	0

No.	Result	Record	Opponent	Type	Round, time	Date	Location	Notes
48	Loss	30–18	Kenan Penjić	PTS	4	6 Apr 2024	Qazim Dervishi Sports Palace, Shkodër, Albania	
47	Loss	30–17	Viktar Chvarkou	RTD	4 (8), 3:00	4 Jun 2023	Shkodër, Shkodër County, Albania	
46	Loss	30–16	Nelson Hysa	KO	3 (10), 1:27	17 Mar 2023	Olympic Park "Feti Borova", Tirana, Albania	For vacant UBO International heavyweight title
45	Loss	30–15	Georgiy Yunovidov	RTD	4 (8), 3:00	11 Dec 2022	DIVS, Ekaterinburg, Russia	
44	Loss	30–14	Umar Salamov	KO	1 (10), 1:41	25 Sep 2022	Basket-Hall Arena, Kazan, Russia	
43	Loss	30–13	Evgenyi Romanov	RTD	7 (10), 3:00	19 Aug 2022	Luzales Arena, Syktyvkar, Russia	
42	Loss	30–12	Alexander Frank	RTD	5 (12), 3:00	14 May 2022	Mitellandhalle, Barleben, Germany	For WBU (Germany) heavyweight title
41	Loss	30–11	Danila Semenov	UD	6	12 Sep 2021	Jekpe-Jek Arena, Astana, Kazakhstan	
40	Win	30–10	Shokran Parwani	TKO	6 (8), 1:42	15 May 2021	USC Soviet Wings, Moscow, Russia	
39	Loss	29–10	Tervel Pulev	TKO	9 (10), 1:30	29 Jan 2021	Next Door Arena, Dar es Salaam, Tanzania	
38	Loss	29–9	Olanrewaju Durodola	RTD	3 (10), 3:00	30 Nov 2019	Old Kingsway Building, Accra, Ghana	
37	Loss	29–8	Akani Phuzi	UD	10	20 Oct 2019	Blairgowrie Recreation Centre, Randburg, South Africa	
36	Win	29–7	Mussa Ajibu	UD	8	24 Nov 2018	Ramatex Hall, Windhoek, Namibia	
35	Loss	28–7	Maxim Vlasov	KO	1 (10), 1:46	21 Dec 2107	USC Soviet Wings, Moscow, Russia	
34	Loss	28–6	Kevin Lerena	TKO	5 (10)	4 Feb 2017	Emeperors Palace, Kempton Park, South Africa	
33	Loss	28–5	Dmitry Kudryashov	KO	6 (10), 1:54	22 May 2015	Luzhniki, Moscow, Russia	
32	Win	28–4	Amour Mzungu	TKO	1 (10), 1:31	20 Mar 2105	Ramatex Factory, Windhoek, Namibia	
31	Win	27–4	Walter David Cabral	TD	6 (10), 3:00	4 Oct 2014	Katutura Independence Arena, Windhoek, Namibia	Unanimous TD: Accidental clash of heads
30	Win	26–4	Alphonce Mchumiatumbo	TKO	11 (12)	17 May 2014	Omuthiya Park, Omuthiya, Namibia	Won vacant WBO Africa cruiserweight title
29	Win	25–4	Sa'id Mbelwa	DQ	4 (10)	14 Dec 2013	Winnie Du Plessis Secondary School Hall, Gobabis, Namibia	
28	Win	24–4	Pascal Abel Ndomba	TKO	2 (12)	5 Oct 2013	Ramatex Factory, Windhoek, Namibia	
27	Win	23–4	Hamza Wandera	TKO	3 (12)	2 Mar 2013	Windhoek Country Club Resort, Windhoek, Namibia	
26	Win	22–4	Edmos Takawira	TKO	1 (6), 2:05	12 Oct 2012	Windhoek Country Club Resort, Windhoek, Namibia	
25	Loss	21–4	Jürgen Brähmer	UD	10	21 Apr 2012	Sport and Congress Center, Schwerin, Germany	
24	Win	21–3	Chamunorwa Gonorenda	UD	8	3 Dec 2011	Windhoek Country Club Resort, Windhoek, Namibia	
23	Loss	20–3	Braimah Kamoko	UD	12	25 Jun 2011	Accra International Conference Centre, Accra, Ghana	Lost WBO Africa light heavyweight title
22	Loss	20–2	Isaac Chilemba	UD	12	26 Mar 2011	Emperors Palace, Kempton Park, South Africa	For vacant WBC International light heavyweight title
21	Win	20–1	Joseph Marwa	RTD	5 (12), 3:00	25 Nov 2010	Windhoek Country Club Resort, Windhoek, Namibia	Retained WBO Africa light heavyweight title
20	Win	19–1	Jevgeņijs Andrejevs	UD	6	17 Jul 2010	Sport and Congress Center, Schwerin, Germany	
19	Win	18–1	Douglas Otieno Okola	KO	11 (12)	20 Mar 2010	Windhoek Country Club Resort, Windhoek, Namibia	Won vacant WBO Africa light heavyweight title
18	Win	17–1	Tineyi Maridzo	KO	2 (8), 1:54	12 Sep 2009	Windhoek Country Club Resort, Windhoek, Namibia	
17	Win	15–1	Panda Lucumbi	TKO	4 (6)	19 Jun 2009	Luanda, Luanda Province, Angola	
16	Win	15–1	Victor Moyo	KO	2 (6)	21 Mar 2009	Windhoek Country Club Resort, Windhoek, Namibia	
15	Win	14–1	Farai Musiyiwa	UD	6	17 Oct 2008	Windhoek Country Club Resort, Windhoek, Namibia	
14	Win	13–1	Gibson Mapfumo	TKO	4 (6)	16 Aug 2008	Windhoek Country Club Resort, Windhoek, Namibia	
13	Win	12–1	Chamunorwa Gonorenda	TKO	5 (6)	20 Jun 2008	Windhoek Country Club Resort, Windhoek, Namibia	
12	Win	11–1	Chamunorwa Gonorenda	UD	6	20 Mar 2008	Windhoek Country Club Resort, Windhoek, Namibia	
11	Win	10–1	Sipho Mukhiti	UD	6	10 Nov 2007	Ongwediva Trade Fair Centre, Ongwediva, Namibia	
10	Win	9–1	Edward Nhundu	TKO	1 (8), 0:56	13 Oct 2007	Windhoek Country Club Resort, Windhoek, Namibia	
9	Loss	8–1	Stanyslav Kashtanov	UD	10	21 Aug 2007	Lenin Square, Donetsk, Ukraine	For WBC Youth super middleweight title
8	Win	8–0	João Tchimbila Willy Makeba	PTS	6	21 Jun 2007	Lubango, Huíla, Angola	
7	Win	7–0	Kenneth Masekwane	UD	4	20 Mar 2007	Windhoek Country Club Resort, Windhoek, Namibia	
6	Win	6–0	Oupa Mahlangu	PTS	4	11 Nov 2006	Ongwediva Trade Fair Centre, Ongwediva, Namibia	
5	Win	5–0	Oupa Mahlangu	SD	4	19 Aug 2006	Windhoek Country Club Resort, Windhoek, Namibia	
4	Win	4–0	Emmanuel Gwala	PTS	4	27 May 2006	Swakopmund Hotel & Entertainment Centre, Swakopmund, Namibia	
3	Win	3–0	Vusi Xaba	PTS	4	6 May 2006	Dobsonville Shopping Centre, Dobsonville, South Africa	
2	Win	2–0	Theophilus Mpakane	TKO	2 (4)	20 Mar 2006	Windhoek Country Club Resort, Windhoek, Namibia	
1	Win	1–0	Elijah Kwenaentsile	PTS	4	1 Oct 2005	Ongwediva Trade Fair Centre, Ongwediva, Namibia	
