= Thomas Oosthuizen =

South African professional boxer

Personal information
- Nickname: Tommy Gun
- Born: 2 April 1988 (age 38) Gauteng, South Africa
- Height: 1.93 m (6 ft 4 in)
- Weight: Super-middleweight; Light-heavyweight; Cruiserweight

Boxing career
- Reach: 198 cm (78 in)
- Stance: Southpaw

Boxing record
- Total fights: 34
- Wins: 29
- Win by KO: 16
- Losses: 3
- Draws: 2

Thomas Oosthuizen (/ˈwɛsthaɪzən/ WEST-hye-zən; born 2 April 1988) is a South African professional boxer. He is a former IBO world champion in two weight classes, having held the super-middleweight title from 2011 to 2014, and the light-heavyweight title in 2015.

== Professional career ==
Oosthuizen made his professional debut on 29 February 2008, knocking out Johannes Swart in two rounds. He then reeled off twelve straight victories, nine of which coming by way of knockout.

=== IBO super-middleweight champion ===
On 6 November 2010, Oosthuizen faced off against IBO Super Middleweight titleholder Isaac Chilemba. The result was a split-decision draw which allowed Chilemba to retain the title, Oosthuizen claims that attempted to make a rematch were swiftly declined. On 26 March 2011, Oosthuizen got a second crack at the IBO title against Evert Bravo (Chilemba had vacated the title to move up to the Light Heavyweight class). Oosthuizen won the fight via a ninth-round technical knockout, which saw the referee stepping in to save Bravo from taking further punishment. Oosthuizen made his American debut on the undercard of Andre Berto vs. Jan Zaveck, winning a unanimous decision over Aaron Pryor Jr on 3 September 2011.

After two seemingly lackluster performances (a draw with Brandon Gonzáles and split decision victory over Ezequiel Maderna), a motorcycle injury forced Oosthuizen to withdraw from a scheduled bout fight with Eleider Alvarez. He was subsequently released by his promoter Rodney Berman, who cited the fact that Oosthuizen was at least 13 pounds over the 175 lb. limit for the bout; stating, "He's had so many chances and blown every one". Following a brief stint in rehabilitation, Oosthuizen was able to mend ties with his promoter in an attempt to move forward with his boxing career. He vacated his IBO Super Middleweight Title on 21 April 2014.

== Professional boxing record ==
34 fights	29 wins	3 losses
By knockout	17	0
By decision	12	3
Draws	2	

No.	Result	Record	Opponent	Type	Round, time	Date	Location	Notes
34	Win	29–3–2	Limbani Lano	TKO	6 (10)	16 Oct 2022	The Carousel Casino, Hammanskral, Gauteng, South Africa	
33	Loss	28–3–2	Aleksey Egorov	UD	10	23 Mar 2019	RCC Boxing Academy, Yekaterinburg, Russia	For vacant IBF International cruiserweight title
32	Loss	28–2–2	Thabiso Mchunu	UD	12	8 Dec 2018	Emperors Palace, Kempton Park, South Africa	Lost African cruiserweight title; For South African cruiserweight title
31	Win	28–1–2	Thabiso Mchunu	MD	12	1 Sep 2018	Emperors Palace, Kempton Park, South Africa	Won vacant African cruiserweight title
30	Loss	27–1–2	Igor Mikhalkin	UD	12	19 May 2017	Barclaycard Arena, Hamburg, Germany	For vacant IBO light-heavyweight title
29	Win	27–0–2	Said Mbelwa	KO	3 (12)	28 Apr 2017	Carnival City, Brakpan, South Africa	Won vacant African light-heavyweight title
28	Win	26–0–2	Daniel Bruwer	TKO	9 (12)	27 Aug 2016	Birchwood Hotel, Boksburg, South Africa	Won vacant WBA Pan African light-heavyweight title
27	Win	25–0–2	Robert Berridge	UD	12	6 Jun 2015	Emperors Palace, Kempton Park, South Africa	
26	Win	24–0–2	Ryno Liebenberg	SD	12	14 Mar 2015	Emperors Palace, Kempton Park, South Africa	Won vacant IBO light-heavyweight title
25	Win	23–0–2	Denis Grachev	RTD	11 (12), 3:00	15 Nov 2014	Emperors Palace, Kempton Park, South Africa	Won vacant WBC International light-heavyweight title
24	Win	22–0–2	Ezequiel Maderna	MD	12	9 Nov 2013	Emperors Palace, Kempton Park, South Africa	Retained IBO super-middleweight title
23	Draw	21–0–2	Brandon Gonzáles	SD	10	29 Jun 2013	MGM Grand at Foxwoods, Ledyard, Connecticut, US	
22	Win	21–0–1	Fulgencio Zúñiga	UD	12	10 Nov 2012	Emperors Palace, Kempton Park, South Africa	Retained IBO super-middleweight title
21	Win	20–0–1	Rowland Bryant	UD	12	2 Aug 2012	Roseland Ballroom, New York City, New York, US	Retained IBO super-middleweight title
20	Win	19–0–1	Marcus Johnson	UD	10	27 Apr 2012	Buffalo Run Casino, Miami, Oklahoma, US	
19	Win	18–0–1	Serge Yannick	TKO	6 (12), 0:47	3 Mar 2012	Emperors Palace, Kempton Park, South Africa	Retained IBO super-middleweight title
18	Win	17–0–1	Francisco Sierra	TKO	11 (12), 2:59	23 Nov 2011	Emperors Palace, Kempton Park, South Africa	Retained IBO super-middleweight title
17	Win	16–0–1	Aaron Pryor Jr.	UD	12	3 Sep 2011	Beau Rivage, Biloxi, Mississippi, US	Retained IBO super-middleweight title
16	Win	15–0–1	William Gare	UD	12	4 Jun 2011	Emperors Palace, Kempton Park, South Africa	Retained IBO super-middleweight title
15	Win	14–0–1	Evert Bravo	TKO	9 (12), 2:34	26 Mar 2011	Emperors Palace, Kempton Park, South Africa	Won vacant IBO super-middleweight title
14	Draw	13–0–1	Isaac Chilemba	SD	12	6 Nov 2010	Emperors Palace, Kempton Park, South Africa	For IBO super-middleweight title
13	Win	13–0	Saúl Román	KO	8 (10), 0:35	27 Apr 2010	Emperors Palace, Kempton Park, South Africa	
12	Win	12–0	Thomas Awinbono	UD	12	27 Feb 2010	Emperors Palace, Kempton Park, South Africa	Retained WBA Pan African super-middleweight title
11	Win	11–0	Tshepang Mohale	KO	4 (12), 0:48	31 Oct 2009	Emperors Palace, Kempton Park, South Africa	Won vacant WBA Pan African super-middleweight title
10	Win	10–0	Cleber Argente Alves	UD	10	12 Sep 2009	Emperors Palace, Kempton Park, South Africa	Won vacant IBO Youth super-middleweight title
9	Win	9–0	Jared Lovett	SD	10	11 Jul 2009	Emperors Palace, Kempton Park, South Africa	Won vacant IBO Youth light-heavyweight title
8	Win	8–0	Semanda Shabane	TKO	1 (8), 2:58	1 Apr 2009	Emperors Palace, Kempton Park, South Africa	
7	Win	7–0	Jeremiah Baloyi	TKO	1 (4)	17 Nov 2008	Emperors Palace, Kempton Park, South Africa	
6	Win	6–0	Mfundo Wongo	KO	3 (4)	7 Oct 2008	Emperors Palace, Kempton Park, South Africa	
5	Win	5–0	Mzukiseni Lengesi	TKO	1 (4)	13 Sep 2008	Emperors Palace, Kempton Park, South Africa	
4	Win	4–0	Ayanda Nongena	TKO	1 (4)	1 Aug 2008	Birchwood Hotel, Boksburg, South Africa	
3	Win	3–0	Takalani Maluleke	TKO	3 (4)	15 Jul 2008	Emperors Palace, Kempton Park, South Africa	
2	Win	2–0	Shawn Sombyala	TKO	1 (4)	28 May 2008	Birchwood Hotel, Boksburg, South Africa	
1	Win	1–0	Johannes Swart	TKO	2 (4)	29 Feb 2008	Birchwood Hotel, Boksburg, South Africa	

Sporting positions
Regional boxing titles
New title	IBO Youth light-heavyweight champion 11 July 2009 – 12 September 2009; Vacated	Vacant Title next held by Umar Salamov
New title	IBO Youth super-middleweight champion 12 September 2009 – September 2010; Vacated	Vacant Title next held by Pasquale Parmigiano
Vacant Title last held by Kariz Kariuki	WBA Pan African super-middleweight champion 31 October 2009 – November 2010; Vacated	Vacant Title next held by Serge Yannick
Vacant Title last held by Ryno Liebenberg	WBC International light-heavyweight champion 15 November 2014 – March 2015; Vacated	Vacant Title next held by Andrzej Fonfara
Vacant Title last held by Ebenezer Tetteh	WBA Pan African light-heavyweight champion 27 August 2016 – August 2018; Vacated	Vacant
Vacant Title last held by Daniel Wanyonyi	ABU light-heavyweight champion 28 April 2017 – August 2018; Vacated	Vacant
Vacant Title last held by Thabiso Mchunu	ABU cruiserweight champion 1 September 2018 – 8 December 2018	Succeeded by Thabiso Mchunu
Minor world boxing titles
Vacant Title last held by Isaac Chilemba	IBO super-middleweight champion 26 March 2011 – 22 April 2014; Vacated	Vacant Title next held by Don George
Vacant Title last held by Blake Caparello	IBO light-heavyweight champion 14 March 2015 – 5 June 2015; Stripped	Vacant Title next held by Umar Salamov
