= Mathieu Bauderlique =

French boxer (born 1989)

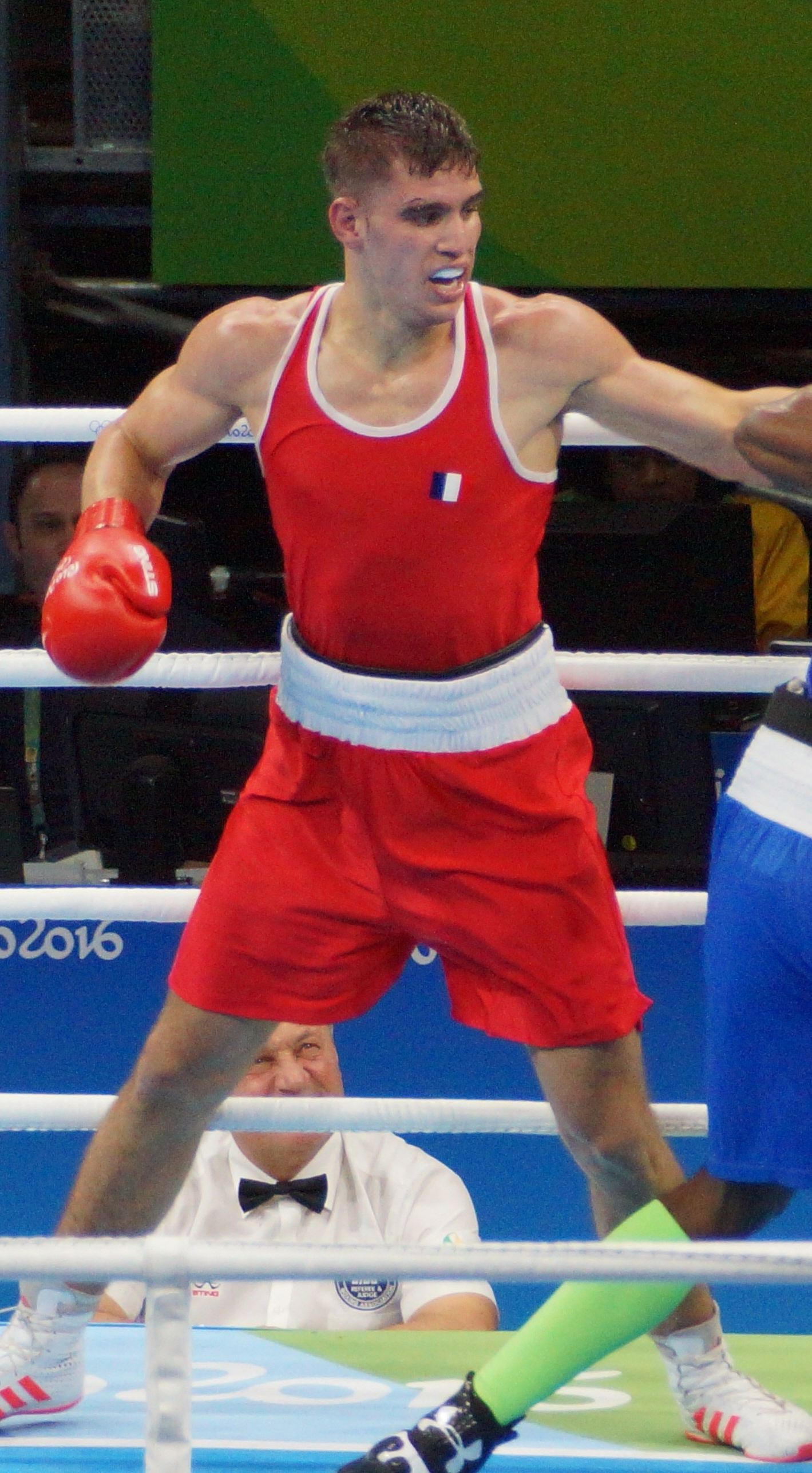
- Bauderlique at the 2016 Olympics

Personal information
- Nationality: French
- Born: Mathieu Bauderlique; 3 July 1989 (age 37) Henin-Beaumont, Pas-de-Calais, France
- Height: 6 ft 1 in (185 cm)
- Weight: Light Heavyweight

Boxing career
- Stance: Southpaw

Boxing record
- Total fights: 23
- Wins: 21
- Win by KO: 12
- Losses: 2
Medal record
Men's amateur boxing
Representing France
Olympic Games
Bronze medal – third place	2016 Rio de Janeiro	Light heavyweight

Mathieu Albert Daniel Bauderlique (born 3 July 1989) is a French former professional boxer. As an amateur, he won a bronze medal in the light heavyweight division at the 2016 Summer Olympics. Bauderlique was born in Henin-Beaumont, Pas-de-Calais, France where he still resides.

== Boxing career ==
Bauderlique made his professional debut on 22 October 2011, with a fourth-round technical knockout of Lubo Hantak. He amassed a 13-1 record during the next six years, with seven stoppage victories.

Bauderlique was scheduled to face Eddy Lacrosse for the vacant French National Light heavyweight title on 28 April 2018. He won the fight by unanimous decision, with scores of 97-92, 99-92 and 96-93. Bauderlique was scheduled to face Yann Binanga Aboghe for the vacant WBC Francophone Light heavyweight title on 11 October 2018. He won the fight by unanimous decision, with two judges awarding him a 99-91 scorecard, while the third judge scored all ten rounds for him. In his last fight of 2018, Bauderlique faced Patrick Bois on 4 December. He won the fight by a fourth-round technical knockout.

Bauderlique was scheduled to face Mustafa Chadlioui for the vacant WBA Inter-continental Light heavyweight title on 28 March 2019. Chadlioui retired from the fight at the end of the eight round. Bauderlique the first defense of his title against Doudou Ngumbu on 18 July 2019. He won the fight by unanimous decision, with scores of 119-108, 117-110 and 119-108. Bauderlique made his second and final title defense against Hugo Kasperski on 13 December 2019, and won the fight by a fifth-round technical knockout.

Bauderlique faced Deibis Berrocal on 5 December 2020, in his sole fight of the year. He won the fight by a second-round technical knockout.

Bauderlique was scheduled to fight Igor Mikhalkin for the vacant EBU Light heavyweight title on 10 September 2021. Mikhalkin retired from the bout at the end of the seventh round.

== Professional boxing record ==
23 fights	21 wins	2 losses
By knockout	12	2
By decision	9	0

No.	Result	Record	Opponent	Type	Round, time	Date	Location	Notes
23	Loss	21-2	(United Kingdom) Callum Smith	KO	4 (12), 1:53	20 Aug 2022	King Abdullah Sports City, Jeddah, Saudi Arabia	WBC light-heavyweight title eliminator
22	Win	21-1	(Russia) Igor Mikhalkin	RTD	7 (12), 3:00	10 Sep 2021	Stade Roland Garros, Paris, France	Wins vacant EBU Light heavyweight title
21	Win	20-1	(Colombia) Deibis Berrocal	TKO	2 (8)	5 Dec 2020	Palais des sports Marcel-Cerdan, Levallois-Perret, France	
20	Win	19-1	(France) Hugo Kasperski	TKO	5 (12)	13 Dec 2019	Palais des sports Marcel-Cerdan, Levallois-Perret, France	Retained WBA Inter-continental Light heavyweight title.
19	Win	18-1	(France) Doudou Ngumbu	UD	12	18 Jul 2019	Theatre du Tivoli, Le Cannet, France	Retained WBA Inter-continental Light heavyweight title.
18	Win	17-1	(Spain) Mustafa Chadlioui	RTD	8 (12)	28 Mar 2019	Zénith de Lille, Lille, France	Wins vacant WBA Inter-continental Light heavyweight title.
17	Win	16-1	(France) Patrick Bois	TKO	4 (10), 2:51	4 Dec 2018	Zénith Paris, Paris, France	
16	Win	15-1	(France) Yann Binanga Aboghe	UD	10	11 Oct 2018	Palais des Sports, Orléans, France	Wins vacant WBC Francophone Light heavyweight title
15	Win	14-1	(France) Eddy Lacrosse	UD	10	28 Apr 2018	Salle Gayant, Douai, France	Wins vacant French National Light heavyweight title
14	Win	13-1	(Georgia (country)) Giorgi Beroshvili	TKO	1 (6), 1:08	12 Oct 2017	Sud de France Arena, Pérols, France	
13	Loss	12-1	(Italy) Dragan Lepei	TKO	1 (8), 2:46	24 Jun 2017	La Salamandre, Pont-Sainte-Maxence, France	
12	Win	12-0	(Serbia) Mile Nikolic	TKO	3 (6)	29 Apr 2017	Espace Francois Mitterrand, Hénin-Beaumont, France	
11	Win	11-0	(Belgium) Matingu Kindele	UD	6	21 Jan 2017	Palais des sports Marcel-Cerdan, Levallois-Perret, France	
10	Win	10-0	(Lithuania) Kiril Psonko	TKO	1 (6)	21 Jan 2016	Espace Francois Mitterrand, Hénin-Beaumont, France	
9	Win	9-0	(Georgia (country)) Giorgi Kandelaki	PTS	8	5 Apr 2014	Espace Francois Mitterrand, Hénin-Beaumont, France	
8	Win	8-0	(France) Youssouf Doumbia	PTS	6	14 Dec 2013	Coudekerque-Village, France	
7	Win	7-0	(France) Adel Belhachemi	PTS	6	16 Nov 2013	Évin-Malmaison, France	
6	Win	6-0	(Lithuania) Vygaudas Laurinkus	KO	1 (6)	26 Apr 2013	Salle COSEC, Montcy-Notre-Dame, France	
5	Win	5-0	(Belgium) Antonio Manuel	TKO	2 (6)	6 Apr 2013	Espace Francois Mitterrand, Hénin-Beaumont, France	
4	Win	4-0	(France) Nicolas Dion	PTS	6	9 Nov 2012	Salle Theo Bouton, Douai, France	
3	Win	3-0	(Latvia) Jevgenijs Andrejevs	PTS	6	20 Apr 2012	Salle Theo Bouton, Douai, France	
2	Win	2-0	(Czech Republic) Tomas Man	RTD	1 (4)	10 Dec 2011	Maison des sports, Bazeilles, France	
1	Win	1-0	(Slovakia) Lubo Hantak	TKO	4 (4)	22 Oct 2011	Salle du manege, Aire-sur-la-Lys, France	
