= Badru Lusambya =

Ugandan boxer

Personal information
- Nickname: Mr. Crush
- Nationality: Ugandan
- Born: 28 October 1982 (age 43) Kampala, Uganda

Boxing career
- Stance: Southpaw

Boxing record
- Total fights: 30
- Wins: 25
- Win by KO: 23
- Losses: 3
- Draws: 2

Badru Lusambya (born 28 October 1982) is a Ugandan super welterweight boxer who turned professional in 2002.

== Professional boxing record ==
Result	Record	Opponent	Type	Date	Location	Notes
30	25-3-2	(Kenya) Joseph Odhiambo	KO	17 April 2016	Lugogo Indoor Mtn Arena, Lugogo, Uganda	
29	24-3-2	(Azerbaijan) Fariz Mammadov	TKO	6 February 2016	Baku, Azerbaijan	lost vacant World Boxing Federation World super welterweight title
28	24-2-2	(Tanzania) Said Yazidu	KO	28 February 2014	Lugogo Indoor Mtn Arena, Lugogo, Uganda	
27	23-2-2	(Tanzania) Zumba Kukwe	KO	1 November 2013	Hilton Hotel Kampala, Kampala, Uganda	
26	22-2-2	(Democratic Republic of the Congo) Vicky Lolenga	TKO	9 January 2011	Little Flowers Arena, Kampala, Uganda	
25	21-2-2	(United Kingdom) Craig Watson	TKO	16 April 2010	Robin Park Centre, Wigan, Lancashire, United Kingdom	lost vacant Commonwealth (British Empire) super welterweight title
24	21-1-2	(Kenya) James Onyango	Draw	20 February 2010	Simmers Restaurant, Nairobi, Kenya	
23	21-1-1	(Tanzania) Idd Kigula	TKO	18 October 2009	Little Flowers Arena, Kampala, Uganda	won vacant African super-welterweight title
22	20-1-1	(Kenya) Ken Oyolo	TKO	29 August 2009	Chui Restaurant, Nairobi, Kenya	
21	19-1-1	(Kenya) Andrew Samba	TKO	26 April 2009	Hood Restaurant, Nairobi, Kenya	
20	18-1-1	(United Kingdom) Chas Symonds	TKO	22 March 2009	York Hall, Bethnal Green, London, United Kingdom	
19	17-1-1	(United Kingdom) Gary McMillan	PTS	6 March 2009	Thistle Hotel, Glasgow, Scotland, United Kingdom	
18	17-0-1	(Poland) Karl Ozimkowski	PTS	17 September 2008	York Hall, Bethnal Green, London, United Kingdom	
17	16-0-1	(Romania) Gheorghe Danut	PTS	29 March 2008	Scottish Exhibition Centre, Glasgow, Scotland, United Kingdom	
16	16-0	(South Africa) Lawrence Ngobeni	TKO	5 August 2007	Fairway Hotel, Kampala, Uganda	
15	15-0	(Kenya) Ken Oyolo	TKO	25 March 2007	Fairway Hotel, Kampala, Uganda	retained African super-welterweight title
14	14-0	(Tanzania) Fred George	TKO	26 January 2007	Fairway Hotel, Kampala, Uganda	
13	13-0	(Kenya) Ken Oyolo	TKO	27 May 2006	Sabrina's Pub, Kampala, Uganda	
12	12-0	(Zimbabwe) Farai Musiyiwa	KO	26 January 2006	Nakivubo Stadium, Kampala, Uganda	
11	11-0	(South Africa) Tshepo Mashego	TKO	18 June 2005	Nakivubo Stadium, Kampala, Uganda	retained African super-welterweight title
10	10-0	(Zambia) Floyd Chongo	KO	16 April 2005	Sabrina's Pub, Kampala, Uganda	
9	9-0	(Uganda) Deo Wanana	KO	30 January 2005	Sabrina's Pub, Kampala, Uganda	
8	8-0	(Kenya) Mohamed Orungi	KO	28 November 2004	Nakivubo Stadium, Kampala, Uganda	
7	7-0	(Zambia) John Chibuta	KO	19 June 2004	Nakivubo Stadium, Kampala, Uganda	won vacant African super-welterweight title
6	6-0	(Tanzania) Maneno Oswald	TKO	20 April 2004	Nakivubo Stadium, Kampala, Uganda	
5	5-0	(Tanzania) Ramadhan Miyeyusho	KO	13 December 2003	Nakivubo Stadium, Kampala, Uganda	
4	4-0	(Uganda) Tom Kakande	KO	26 July 2003	Nakivubo Stadium, Kampala, Uganda	
3	3-0	(Uganda) Meddie Serunjogi	KO	25 May 2003	Sabrina's Pub, Kampala, Uganda	
2	2-0	(Kenya) Stephen Esonga	KO	12 December 2002	Sabrina's Pub, Kampala, Uganda	
1	1-0	(Uganda) Meddie Serunjogi	PTS	27 October 2002	Sabrina's Pub, Kampala, Uganda	Professional debut
