= Nelson Hysa =

Albanian boxer (born 1984

Personal information
- Born: 6 September 1984 (age 42) Shkodër, Albania
- Height: 6 ft 5 in (196 cm)
- Weight: Heavyweight

Boxing career
- Reach: 79 in (201 cm)
- Stance: Orthodox

Boxing record
- Total fights: 25
- Wins: 25
- Win by KO: 23

Nelson Hysa (born 3 September 1984) is an Albanian professional boxer. At regional level, he held multiple heavyweight championships. As an amateur, he represented Albania at multiple international tournaments, including the Mediterranean Games and World Championships.

As of October 2026, Hysa is ranked No. 9 by the WBO.

== Early life ==
Nelson Hysa was born in Shkodër, Albania. Raised in a sports-oriented family background, he began boxing at a young age, starting his training around the year 2000. Over the course of his extensive youth and amateur career, Hysa emerged as one of Albania's most decorated amateur boxers, winning the Albanian national heavyweight championship 22 times. He went on to represent Albania at major international competitions for over two decades before turning professional.

== Amateur career ==
Hysa had an extensive amateur career spanning over two decades from 2000 to 2023, during which he established himself as Albania's dominant super-heavyweight (+91 kg / +92 kg) boxer. He secured 22 national championship titles in Albania and spent nearly twenty years as the primary super-heavyweight representative on the Albanian national team.

Throughout his international amateur tenure, Hysa represented Albania at major continental and international multi-sport events and championships, including the World Amateur Boxing Championships, the Mediterranean Games, and European Olympic qualifying tournaments. Over the course of his career, he faced several high-profile international heavyweights, sharing the ring with future Olympic champion and world title challenger Roberto Cammarelle, future Olympic gold medalist David Price, and world title challenger Kubrat Pulev.

In addition to his national titles, Hysa achieved victories in regional international tournaments such as the Adem Jashari Tournament in Kosovo and the Vllaznia Memorial Tournament in Shkodër. He continued to compete in international amateur tournaments until mid-2023—including the 2023 IBA Men's World Boxing Championships in Tashkent - concurrently with the start of his professional boxing career.

== Professional career ==
=== Early career ===
After a lengthy amateur career spanning over two decades, Hysa made his professional debut late in his athletic career at age 37 on 14 May 2022, defeating Stefan Cajic in Tirana via first-round retirement. Competing as "The Albanian Eagle", he maintained an extraordinarily active schedule during his first two years in the professional ranks.

In 2022, Hysa built an undefeated record of 5–0, including a notable unanimous decision win over former British heavyweight contender Danny Williams in November. In 2023, he drastically accelerated his activity, securing eight consecutive victories—seven of them coming inside the distance. During this span, he claimed his first minor regional titles. In March 2023, he captured the Universal Boxing Organization (UBO) International Heavyweight Title by knocking out Vikapita Meroro, followed by winning the Universal Boxing Federation (UBF) International title against Juan Camilo Novoa in April.

Hysa capped off 2023 by winning his first major regional belt, defeating Maximiliano Alejandro Sosa for the vacant WBC-CISBB Heavyweight Title in September, which he successfully defended two months later against Viktar Chvarkou. By the end of 2023, Hysa had compiled a 14–0 professional record with 12 knockouts.

=== Rise up the ranks ===
Following his early success, Hysa accelerated his push toward world contention throughout 2024 and 2025 by securing major regional titles and climbing the international sanctioning body rankings.

In July 2024, Hysa captured the vacant WBO European Heavyweight Title by defeating Germany's Thorsten Fuchs via first-round knockout in Tirana. He continued his undefeated momentum with stoppage victories over Jeison Troncoso and Ariel Esteban Bracamonte later that year.

In October 2025, Hysa scored a third-round stoppage victory over Abel Pesut to claim both the WBA Gold Heavyweight Title and the vacant WBO Global Heavyweight Title. Maintaining a frequent competition schedule, Hysa reached an undefeated record of 25–0 with 23 knockouts following a technical knockout win over Thomas Narmo. His title defenses and high knockout percentage propelled him into the top world rankings, securing spots as the No. 5 heavyweight contender in the WBA and No. 10 in the WBO.

=== WBC heavyweight title challenge ===
==== Hysa vs. Kabayel ====
On 28 November 2026, Hysa is scheduled to face reigning WBC Heavyweight Champion Agit Kabayel at the Merkur Spiel-Arena in Düsseldorf, Germany. Following public exchanges and a direct challenge issued by Hysa, the matchup was formally booked as Kabayel's first defense of his WBC title. The bout represents Hysa's first opportunity at a major world title and offering him the opportunity to become the first Albanian world champion in heavyweight boxing history.

== Personal life ==
Hysa is married and has children. He resides in Tirana, Albania, having spent much of his earlier life and boxing career based in his native city of Shkodër. Hysa has frequently emphasized the key role his family plays in his life and athletic motivation. In interviews, he has noted that his wife regularly attends his professional bouts, while he generally avoids having his young children present in the arena due to the physical intensity of the sport.

== Professional boxing record ==
25 fights	25 wins	0 losses
By knockout	23	0
By decision	2	0

No.	Result	Record	Opponent	Type	Round	Date	Location	Notes
25	Win	25–0	Thomas Narmo	TKO	2 (10), 0:36	29 Aug 2026	O2 Arena, London, England	Retained WBO Global heavyweight title
24	Win	24–0	Abel Pesut	RTD	3 (10), 3:00	9 Oct 2025	Tirana Olympic Park, Tirana, Albania	Won vacant WBA Gold and WBO Global heavyweight titles
23	Win	23–0	Patrick Korte	TKO	2 (10), 2:05	7 Jun 2025	Portman Road, Ipswich, England	Retained WBO European heavyweight title
22	Win	22–0	Edwin Castillo	KO	3 (10), 0:40	12 Apr 2025	RuhrCongress, Bochum, Germany	
21	Win	21–0	Yonny Molina	KO	1 (8), 1:38	8 Mar 2025	Wolf-Ferrari-Haus, Ottobrunn, Germany	
20	Win	20–0	Todorche Cvetkov	TKO	3 (10), 0:49	15 Feb 2025	Harrow Leisure Centre, London, England	Retained WBO European heavyweight title
19	Win	19–0	Ariel Esteban Bracamonte	KO	2 (8), 1:12	22 Nov 2024	York Hall, London, England	
18	Win	18–0	Thorsten Fuchs	KO	1 (10), 1:45	20 Jul 2024	Skanderbeg Square, Tirana, Albania	Won vacant WBO European heavyweight title
17	Win	17–0	Jeison Troncoso	KO	3 (10)	1 Jun 2024	Patinoires du Littoral, Neuchâtel, Switzerland	Won vacant IBO International heavyweight title
16	Win	16–0	Brayan Santander	KO	2 (8), 0:37	14 Apr 2024	Qazim Dervishi Sports Palace, Shkodër, Albania	
15	Win	15–0	Lukas Ndafoluma	TKO	6 (10), 2:18	30 Mar 2024	Shkodër, Albania	
14	Win	14–0	Luis Jose Marin Garcia	KO	1 (10), 1:06	16 Dec 2023	Challenge Club Arena, Offenbach, Germany	
13	Win	13–0	Deivis Casseres	KO	1 (8), 0:50	28 Nov 2023	Tirana Olympic Park, Tirana, Albania	
12	Win	12–0	Viktar Chvarkou	RTD	3 (10), 3:00	18 Nov 2023	Tirana Olympic Park, Tirana, Albania	Retained WBC-CISBB heavyweight title
11	Win	11–0	Maximiliano Alejandro Sosa	TKO	1 (10), 2:10	9 Sep 2023	Ostermann-Arena, Leverkusen, Germany	Won vacant WBC-CISBB heavyweight title
10	Win	10–0	Marcos Antonio Aumada	RTD	3 (8), 3:00	29 Jul 2023	City Square, Tetovo, North Macedonia	
9	Win	9–0	Willbeforce Shihepo	TKO	3 (8), 1:05	4 Jun 2023	Shkodër, Albania	
8	Win	8–0	Juan Camilo Novoa	TKO	3 (10), 2:20	1 Apr 2023	Podgorica, Montenegro	Won vacant UBF International heavyweight title
7	Win	7–0	Vikapita Meroro	KO	3 (10), 1:27	17 Mar 2023	Tirana Olympic Park, Tirana, Albania	Won vacant UBO International heavyweight title
6	Win	6–0	Pavel Sour	UD	6	23 Jan 2023	Qazim Dervishi Sports Palace, Shkodër, Albania	
5	Win	5–0	Danny Williams	UD	6	13 Nov 2022	Ramazan Njala Sports Palace, Durrës, Albania	
4	Win	4–0	Muhammed Ali Durmaz	TKO	4 (6), 2:17	24 Sep 2022	No Limit Boxing, Leverkusen, Germany	
3	Win	3–0	Fadil Pasalic	KO	2 (6), 2:00	9 Sep 2022	Diamma Resort, Durrës, Albania	
2	Win	2–0	Drazan Janjanin	RTD	3 (6), 3:00	25 Jul 2022	Democracy Square, Shkodër, Albania	
1	Win	1–0	Stefan Cajic	RTD	1 (4), 3:00	14 May 2022	Farie Hoti Sports Palace, Tirana, Albania	

== See also ==
- List of male boxers

Sporting positions
Regional boxing titles
Vacant Title last held by Sezer Olpak	UBO International heavyweight champion 17 March 2023 – October 2023; Vacated	Vacant Title next held by Taryel Jafarov
Vacant Title last held by Thorsten Fuchs	UBF International heavyweight champion 1 April 2023 – June 2026; Vacated	Vacant Title next held by Malik Titus
Vacant Title last held by Boban Filipovic	WBC-CISBB heavyweight champion 9 September 2023 – April 2024; Vacated	Vacant Title next held by Umut Camkiran
Vacant Title last held by Nick Webb	IBO International heavyweight champion 1 June 2024 – February 2025; Vacated	Vacant Title next held by Jeamie Tshikeva
Vacant Title last held by Tahir Kahrovic	WBO European heavyweight champion 11 July 2024 – January 2026; Vacated	Vacant Title next held by Viktor Vykhryst
Vacant Title last held by Michael Hunter	WBA Gold heavyweight champion 10 October 2025 – present	Incumbent
Vacant Title last held by Justis Huni	WBO Global heavyweight champion 10 October 2025 – present	Incumbent
