= Isaac Chilemba =

Malawian boxer (born 1987)

Personal information
- Nickname: Golden Boy
- Nationality: Malawian
- Born: Miguel Isaac Chilemba Zuze; 17 May 1987 (age 39) Blantyre, Malawi
- Height: 6 ft 0 in (183 cm)
- Weight: Super-middleweight; Light-heavyweight

Boxing career
- Reach: 73 in (185 cm)
- Stance: Orthodox

Boxing record
- Total fights: 40
- Wins: 27
- Win by KO: 10
- Losses: 10
- Draws: 3

Miguel Isaac Chilemba Zuze (born 17 May 1987) is a Malawian professional boxer who held the IBO super-middleweight title from 2010 to 2011, and challenged for the WBA (Undisputed), IBF, and WBO light-heavyweight titles in 2016 and for the WBA light-heavyweight title in 2018

== Early professional career ==
Chilemba made his professional debut in Gauteng, South Africa on 19 October 2005 defeating Thamsanga Tindleni in the 2nd round of a 4 round contest. He compiled a run of eight successive victories before dropping a points decision to Willbeforce Shihepo on 5 July 2007 at the Emperor's Palace in Gauteng. The reverse to Shihepo was immediately rectified in his next fight, again in Gauteng, on 21 November 2007 defeating Shihepo on points over six rounds. Two more fights followed in 2008 resulting in wins over David Basajjamivule and Chamunorowa Gonorenda before Chilemba got the opportunity to fight for the African Boxing Unions super middleweight championship on 13 September 2008. The fight for the title once again took place at the Emperor's Palace and pitched Chilemba against the experienced former Commonwealth champion Charles Adamu with Chilemba winning the fight with a 12 round decision to lift the title.

== Championship fights ==
In his next fight Chilemba stepped up to light heavyweight and challenged former victim David Basajjamivule for the WBO version of the light heavyweight title. The fight at the Graceland Casino in Mpumalanga took place on 13 June 2009 and resulted in a second victory over the Ugandan. Chilemba followed this up on 31 October 2009 with another title win, this time defeating French based Congolese fighter Doudou Ngumbu to lift the African Boxing Union's light heavyweight version as well as the WBC International title. A first defence of the WBC title was due to have been made on 26 March 2010 with the Malawian travelling to England to meet former British champion Tony Oakey on a Ricky Hatton promoted bill. The fight however never materialised after Oakey lost an English title fight to fellow countryman Danny McIntosh. Following Oakey, the next opponent lined up for Chilemba was to be Rupert van Aswegen but he then chose to retire from the sport altogether leaving the Malawian once again without an opponent.

=== IBO World Title ===
Following the pullout, Chilemba moved back down at super middleweight for the chance to fight undefeated Australian Michael Bolling on 19 June 2010 for the vacant IBO world title. The fight at the Emperor's Palace, resulted in another win for the Malawian and was his fourth title fight in a row in which a different title had been on the line. Chilemba made the first defence of his IBO belt on 6 November 2010 returning to the Emperors Palace and retaining with a gruelling draw against touted South African Thomas Oosthuizen despite being the underdog going into the fight. On 25 February 2011 Chilemba travelled to Tulsa, Oklahoma to fight in the United States for the first time. His opponent, the unbeaten Russian Maxim Vlasov had won all 19 of his previous fights and managed to knock Chilemba down twice in the 8th round. Despite this the Malawian was able to win the fight over the 10 round distance.

==== Chilemba vs. Meroro ====
Chilemba returned to South Africa for his next fight against Namibian boxer Vikapita Meroro and retained the WBC International light heavyweight title on 26 March 2011 with a unanimous points win.

==== Chilemba vs. Bivol ====
On August 4, 2018, Chilemba challenged Dmitry Bivol for his WBA light heavyweight belt. Bivol landed 34.5% of his punches compared to Chiilemba's 15.5% and all three judges saw Bivol as the clear winner, scoring the fight 120-108, 120-108 and 112-112 for the champion.

== Professional boxing record ==
40 fights	27 wins	10 losses
By knockout	11	2
By decision	16	8
Draws	3	

No.	Result	Record	Opponent	Type	Round, time	Date	Location	Notes
40	Loss	27–10–3	Aleksei Papin	KO	2 (8), 2:50	24 May 2024	Balashikha Arena, Balashikha, Russia	For vacant WBA Asia East cruiserweight title
39	Win	27–9–3	Mbaruku Kheri	KO	2 (10), 1:53	16 Sep 2022	The Carousel Casino, Hammanskraal, South Africa	
38	Loss	26–9–3	Osleys Iglesias	UD	12	27 May 2022	Hala Globus, ul. Kazimierza Wielkiego 8, Lublin, Poland	For vacant IBO International and vacant WBA Inter-Continental super middleweight titles
37	Loss	26–8–3	Pavel Silyagin	UD	12	26 Nov 2021	USC Soviet Wings, Moscow, Russia	For WBC Silver super-middleweight title
36	Draw	26–7–3	Fedor Chudinov	SD	10	20 Feb 2021	Crocus City Hall, Krasnogorsk, Russia	
35	Win	26–7–2	Alexander Kubich	UD	8	13 Dec 2019	P.A.O.K. Sports Arena, Thessaloniki, Greece	
34	Loss	25–7–2	Maxim Vlasov	UD	12	20 Jul 2019	Central Square, Gelendzhik, Russia	For vacant EBP light-heavyweight title
33	Loss	25–6–2	Dmitry Bivol	UD	12	4 Aug 2018	Etess Arena, Atlantic City, New Jersey, U.S.	For WBA light-heavyweight title
32	Win	25–5–2	Blake Caparello	UD	12	16 Mar 2018	The Melbourne Pavilion, Flemington, Australia	Won vacant WBC International light-heavyweight title
31	Loss	24–5–2	Oleksandr Gvozdyk	RTD	8 (10), 3:00	19 Nov 2016	T-Mobile Arena, Paradise, Nevada, U.S.	For NABF light-heavyweight title
30	Loss	24–4–2	Sergey Kovalev	UD	12	11 Jul 2016	Divs Hotel, Yekaterinburg, Russia	For WBA (Undisputed), IBF, and WBO light-heavyweight titles
29	Loss	24–3–2	Eleider Álvarez	MD	12	28 Nov 2015	Videotron Centre, Quebec City, Quebec, Canada	For WBC Silver light-heavyweight title
28	Win	24–2–2	Vasily Lepikhin	UD	10	14 Mar 2015	Bell Centre, Montreal, Quebec, Canada	Won vacant NABF light-heavyweight title
27	Win	23–2–2	Cory Cummings	TKO	7 (10), 2:28	2 Aug 2014	Revel Atlantic City, Atlantic City, New Jersey, U.S.	
26	Win	22–2–2	Denis Grachev	UD	10	15 Mar 2014	Sands Casino Resort, Bethlehem, Pennsylvania, U.S.	
25	Win	21–2–2	Michael Gbenga	UD	8	16 Nov 2013	Turning Stone Resort & Casino, Verona, New York, U.S.	
24	Loss	20–2–2	Tony Bellew	UD	12	25 May 2013	The O2 Arena, London, England	For WBC Silver light-heavyweight title
23	Draw	20–1–2	Tony Bellew	SD	12	30 Mar 2013	Echo Arena, Liverpool, England	For WBC Silver light-heavyweight title
22	Win	20–1–1	Rayco Saunders	UD	8	29 Sep 2012	Foxwoods Resort Casino, Ledyard, Connecticut, U.S.	
21	Win	19–1–1	Edison Miranda	UD	10	3 Feb 2012	Texas Station Casino, North Las Vegas, Nevada, U.S.	
20	Win	18–1–1	Jameson Bostic	KO	2 (8), 1:48	1 Oct 2011	Boardwalk Hall, Atlantic City, New Jersey, U.S.	
19	Win	17–1–1	Vikapita Meroro	UD	10	26 Mar 2011	Emperor's Palace, Kempton Park, South Africa	Won vacant WBC International light-heavyweight title
18	Win	16–1–1	Maxim Vlasov	UD	10	25 Feb 2011	Million Dollar Elm Casino, Tulsa, Oklahoma, U.S.	
17	Draw	15–1–1	Thomas Oosthuizen	SD	12	6 Nov 2010	Emperor's Palace, Kempton Park, South Africa	Retained IBO super-middleweight title
16	Win	15–1	Michael Bolling	UD	12	19 Jun 2010	Emperor's Palace, Kempton Park, South Africa	Won vacant IBO super-middleweight title
15	Win	14–1	Doudou Ngumbu	UD	12	31 Oct 2009	Emperor's Palace, Kempton Park, South Africa	Won WBC International and African light-heavyweight titles
14	Win	13–1	David Basajjamivule	UD	12	13 Jun 2009	Graceland Hotel Casino, Secunda, South Africa	Won vacant WBO Africa light-heavyweight title
13	Win	12–1	Charles Adamu	UD	12	13 Sep 2008	Emperor's Palace, Kempton Park, South Africa	Won vacant African super-middleweight title
12	Win	11–1	Chamunorwa Gonorenda	KO	4 (6)	15 Jul 2008	Emperor's Palace, Kempton Park, South Africa	
11	Win	10–1	David Basajjamivule	TKO	8 (8)	29 Apr 2008	Emperor's Palace, Kempton Park, South Africa	
10	Win	9–1	Willbeforce Shihepo	PTS	6	21 Nov 2007	Emperor's Palace, Kempton Park, South Africa	
9	Loss	8–1	Willbeforce Shihepo	PTS	6	5 Jul 2007	Emperor's Palace, Kempton Park, South Africa	
8	Win	8–0	Godfrey Nene	TKO	2 (6)	12 May 2007	Emperor's Palace, Kempton Park, South Africa	
7	Win	7–0	Charles Chisamba	PTS	6	27 Mar 2007	Emperor's Palace, Kempton Park, South Africa	
6	Win	6–0	Emmanuel Gwala	TKO	4 (6)	1 Dec 2006	Orlando Communal Hall, Soweto, South Africa	
5	Win	5–0	Ronnie Lategan	TKO	2 (4)	17 Nov 2006	Emperor's Palace, Kempton Park, South Africa	
4	Win	4–0	Mark Sloane	PTS	4	11 Jul 2006	Emperor's Palace, Kempton Park, South Africa	
3	Win	3–0	Sithembiso Ngcobo	KO	1 (4), 1:18	25 May 2006	Carnival City, Brakpan, South Africa	
2	Win	2–0	Oupa Mahlangu	TKO	4 (4)	10 Feb 2006	Graceland Hotel Casino, Secunda, South Africa	
1	Win	1–0	Thamsanqa Tindleni	TKO	4 (4)	19 Oct 2005	Carnival City, Secunda, South Africa	

Sporting positions
Regional boxing titles
Vacant Title last held by Charles Adamu	ABU super-middleweight champion 13 September 2008 – April 2009; Vacated	Vacant Title next held by Flash Issaka
New title	WBO Africa light-heavyweight champion 13 June 2009 – September 2009; Vacated	Vacant Title next held by Vikapita Meroro
Preceded by Doudou Ngumbu	WBC International light-heavyweight champion 31 October 2009 – July 2010; Vacated	Vacant Title next held by Himself
Preceded by Doudou Ngumbu	ABU light-heavyweight champion 31 October 2009 – July 2010; Vacated	Vacant Title next held by Doudou Ngumbu
Vacant Title last held by Himself	WBC International light-heavyweight champion 26 March 2011 – January 2012; Vacated	Vacant Title next held by Joey Vegas
Vacant Title last held by Jean Pascal	NABF light-heavyweight champion 14 March 2015 – August 2015; Vacated	Vacant Title next held by Oleksandr Gvozdyk
Vacant Title last held by Sullivan Barrera	WBC International light-heavyweight champion 16 March 2018 – July 2018; Vacated	Vacant Title next held by Serge Michel
Minor world boxing titles
Vacant Title last held by Peter Manfredo, Jr.	IBO super-middleweight champion 19 June 2010 – January 2011; Vacated	Vacant Title next held by Thomas Oosthuizen
