= Juliwe Cemetery =

Closed cemetery in Johannesburg, South Africa

Juliwe Cemetery is the last resting place for the population of Juliwe in Johannesburg, South Africa. The cemetery played a great role in cultural, community and religious life and ritual activity; both Christian and African ancestral rites were carried out there.

The cemetery, situated to the west of the nearby cattle kraal, held significant historical and cultural importance. By 1959, it contained approximately 2,000 adult graves, accommodating a total of 3,000 interments, along with 2,635 graves dedicated to infants. The site exemplified a unique spirit of solidarity, with diverse ethnic groups—such as the Xhosa and Tswana—mutually accommodating each other's cultural preferences and practices.

== History ==
In negotiations over the removal of the residents of Juliwe to the new township of Dobsonville, Soweto, in the late 1950s and 1960s, the cemetery became a contentious issue. With the rest of Juliwe having been erased and covered over by the development of a white-only township, only the cemetery remains as a stark reminder of the community that it supported.

== Location ==
The cemetery is located in the present day Horizon View shopping center, and it is now surrounded on all sides by a suburban homes and covers a full city block bounded by Albert street and van Stanten drive.
