= Zach Walters =

American boxer (born 1981)

Personal information
- Nickname: Jungle Boy
- Nationality: (United States) American
- Born: Zach Walters; February 4, 1981 (age 45) Taolagnaro, Madagascar
- Height: 6 ft 4 in (193 cm)
- Weight: Light Heavyweight

Boxing career
- Stance: Orthodox stance

Boxing record
- Total fights: 30
- Wins: 24
- Win by KO: 19
- Losses: 5
- Draws: 0
- No contests: 1

Zach Walters, alias Jungle Boy, (born February 4, 1981) is an American former professional boxer who competed from 2002 to 2009, holding the African and NABA light heavyweight titles. Walters is now a boxing trainer and promoter. He owns the Jungle Boy Boxing Gym, a non-profit organization in Duluth and promotes fights as Jungle Boy Fights.

== Personal life ==
Zach Walters was born in Duluth, Minnesota, and spent the first eleven years of his life in Madagascar as the son of missionary parents. He now calls Duluth, Minnesota, his home.

== Professional career ==
Walters' professional career began on June 7, 2002, with a first-round TKO victory over Lonzie Pembleton. The fight was part of a show staged at Wade Stadium in Duluth, Minnesota.

After five wins to open his career, Walters suffered his first career loss to Robert Linton by unanimous decision. Another victory for the 'Jungle Boy' earned a shot at the vacant Minnesota Light Heavyweight State Title, where Walters (7–1) defeated Marty Lindquist (11–3) by Round 2 TKO.

Walters strung together ten-straight wins before losing again to Hugo Pineda (38–3–1) in November 2006. Walters soldiered on and after six-consecutive wins to earn a shot at the vacant African light-heavyweight title. Walters' original announced opponent was Marlon Hayes, but Hayes pulled out and was replaced by veteran Carl Daniels (50–11–1). The fight took place on February 23, 2008, and resulted in an 8th-round TKO win for Walters.

On June 7, 2008, Walters defeated Aaron Norwood by second-round knockout. In so doing, Walters claimed his second regional title, the vacant NABA United States Light Heavyweight belt. The victory improved Walters pro record to 23–2.

In August 2008 Walters lost to tough journeyman Shawn Hammack (16–6–2) in a bout that he seemed to be well on his way to winning, getting caught in the final round and stopped with 30 seconds to go. Another loss followed to Byron Mitchell (26–4–1) in February 2009 for the NABA United States Light Heavyweight title. Walters returned four months later to win in Duluth, but after a December 2009 loss to Larry Sharpe by 1st-round TKO he announced his retirement.

Walters' career record was 24–5 with 19 wins by knockout.
