= Prince Patel =

British boxer

Personal information
- Born: Luqmaan Prince Patel; 3 January 1993 (age 33) Blackburn, Lancashire, England
- Height: 5 ft 8 in (173 cm)
- Weight: Welterweight; Super-flyweight; Bantamweight; Featherweight

Boxing career
- Stance: Southpaw

Boxing record
- Total fights: 32
- Wins: 29
- Win by KO: 24
- Losses: 1
- Draws: 2
Medal record
Men's amateur boxing
Representing England
English National Championships
Silver medal – second place	2013 Houghton-le-Spring	Light-Flyweight

Luqmaan Prince Patel (born 3 January 1993), better known as Prince Patel, is a British professional boxer who was the International Boxing Organization (IBO) bantamweight champion from December 2023 to April 2024. He has also held multiple regional championships, including the vacant Commonwealth super-flyweight title since March 2021 and the African super-flyweight title in 2019. Patel is the first boxer of Indian descent to have won a Commonwealth, WBA, and IBF title.

Prince Patel is the first and only boxer of Indian descent to have won a World Championship Boxing title.

== Early life ==
Prince Patel grew up in West London and attended Isleworth and Syon School. He joins multiple-time Olympic champion Mo Farah, Chelsea FC and England International footballer Reece James and England International cricketer Owais Shah as notable former students who have achieved sporting success.

== Amateur career ==
Prince Patel started his boxing journey at the age of 11 years, by competing as an amateur in the UK, where he achieved a record of 36 – 17. During this time he represented a number of amateur boxing clubs across London such as: Northolt ABC, Dale Youth, Earlsfield ABC, and Repton ABC. He had his first amateur bout at the age of 12. By the end of his amateur career, Patel had successfully won four national titles and two British titles. He also reached two national ABA finals.

== Professional career ==
Patel became a licensed professional boxer in 2015, where he signed his first professional contract with Goodwin Promotions. Patel made his professional boxing debut on 14 March 2015 at York Hall, which resulted in a knockout victory within 90 seconds. Shortly after this win, he left Goodwin Promotions by mutual consent and signed with Queensberry Promotions, and had a management deal with Hall of Fame promoter Frank Warren.

After having a few professional boxing matches under this new promotion and management, Patel left due to a lack of fights and activity, where he had only one fight under the Queensberry Promotions banner in an eighteen-month period. Instead of seeking out a new promotor or manager, Patel proceeded to box independently and internationally.

In 2019, the Universal Boxing Organization (UBO) awarded Patel the "Knockout of the Year 2019" title.

In Nov 2024, Ghanaian boxer and former Manny Pacquiao opponent, Joshua Clottey called Prince Patel out, stating that he's "not retired" and that he wants to "fight him" if "he's ready to challenge".

In 2024, the Universal Boxing Organization (UBO) awarded Patel the "New Champion of the Year 2024" title.

== Professional boxing record ==
36 fights	33 wins	1 loss
By knockout	28	0
By decision	5	1
Draws	2	

No.	Result	Record	Opponent	Type	Round, time	Date	Location	Notes
35	Win	32–1–2	Maxwell Awuku	RTD	6 (12)	24 Nov 2024	Bukom Boxing Arena, Accra, Ghana	
34	Win	31–1–2	Ibrahim Komu	TKO	4 (8)	15 Aug 2024	Magereza Hall, Zanzibar	
33	Win	30–1–2	Benjamin Ashley	RTD	3 (8)	15 Jun 2024	Bukom Boxing Arena, Accra, Ghana	
32	Win	29–1–2	Aliu Bamidele Lasisi	TKO	6 (12), 1:16	19 Dec 2023	Accra Sports Stadium, Accra, Ghana	Won vacant IBO bantamweight title
31	Win	28–1–2	Ramadhani Kumbele	KO	5 (10)	9 July 2023	Ukumbi Wa Tasuba, Bagamoyo, Tanzania	
30	Win	27–1–2	Goodluck Mrema	TKO	5 (10), 1:31	15 Apr 2023	Tolworth Recreation Centre, London, England	
29	Win	26–1–2	Juma Fundi	KO	1 (12)	29 Mar 2023	Tasuba Theatre, Bagamoyo, Tanzania	
28	Win	25–1–2	Goodluck Mrema	RTD	9 (12), 3:00	27 Nov 2021	AMA basketball court, Accra, Ghana	Retained WBO Global super-flyweight title; Won vacant IBF Inter-Continental super-flyweight title
27	Win	24–1–2	Julias Thomas Kisarawe	TKO	9 (12), 2:12	27 Mar 2021	Cahaya Lounge, Accra, Ghana	Won vacant Commonwealth, WBA Inter-Continental, IBF Continental Africa, WBO Africa, and WBO Global super-flyweight titles
26	Draw	23–1–2	Innocent Evarist	SD	12	16 Oct 2020	Keko Mabembeani Ground, Dar-es-Salaam, Tanzania	For vacant WBO Africa and WBO Global super-flyweight titles
25	Win	23–1–1	Janis Puksins	RTD	1 (6), 3:00	25 Jan 2020	Night Club First, Riga, Latvia	
24	Win	22–1–1	Ilgvars Krauklis	TKO	1 (6)	27 Dec 2019	Gildehaus, Lüchow, Germany	
23	Win	21–1–1	Luis Melendez	KO	4 (12), 1:57	21 Sep 2019	Sporthalle, Dorf Mecklenburg, Germany	
22	Win	20–1–1	Iddi Kayumba	TKO	5 (12)	22 Aug 2019	ACE Club, Cairo, Egypt	Won vacant African bantamweight title
21	Loss	19–1–1	Michell Banquez	UD	12	12 Jul 2019	King Abdullah Sports City, Jeddah, Saudi Arabia	For vacant IBO bantamweight title
20	Win	19–0–1	Innocent Evarist	TKO	2 (10)	24 May 2019	Greek Club, Heliopolis, Egypt	Won vacant PST bantamweight title
19	Win	18–0–1	Ronald Ramos	KO	4 (12), 2:00	13 Jan 2019	Morrison's Pub, Budapest, Hungary	Won vacant UBO and WBF bantamweight titles
18	Win	17–0–1	John Chuwa	UD	8	9 Sep 2018	Morrison's Pub, Budapest, Hungary	
17	Win	16–0–1	Julias Thomas Kisarawe	TKO	5 (8), 2:49	21 Jul 2018	Gregor József School, Budapest, Hungary	
16	Win	15–0–1	Jaba Memishishi	UD	6	2 Jun 2018	Szechenyi Sporthall, Szolnok, Hungary	
15	Win	14–0–1	Mishiko Shubitidze	TKO	5 (10), 2:35	5 May 2018	Diadal úti ált. iskola, Budapest, Hungary	Won vacant WBO European bantamweight title
14	Win	13–0–1	Zsolt Kocsis	TKO	1 (4), 0:21	28 Apr 2018	Szechenyi Sporthall, Szolnok, Hungary	
13	Win	12–0–1	Vinjamins Dimovs	KO	1 (4), 0:41	25 Mar 2018	Olympic Sports Centre, Riga, Latvia	Won vacant BBU Youth super-flyweight title
12	Win	11–0–1	Ahmet Kuricaj	KO	2 (8), 1:37	11 Mar 2018	DK Peklo, Plzeň, Czech Republic	
11	Win	10–0–1	Eriks Kolasovs	TKO	1 (8), 1:51	4 Mar 2018	Olaine, Latvia	Won vacant BBU International featherweight title
10	Win	9–0–1	Aleksandrs Cebakovs	TKO	1 (8), 1:15	10 Feb 2018	POSiR Hala sportów walki, ul.Reymonta 35, Poznań, Poland	
9	Win	8–0–1	Robert Kanalas	TKO	4 (6), 1:44	4 Feb 2018	Csigahaz Muvelodesi Kozpont, Kistarcsa, Hungary	
8	Win	7–0–1	Richard Voros	TKO	1 (6), 1:47	21 Jan 2018	Diadal úti ált. iskola, Budapest, Hungary	
7	Win	6–0–1	Zsolt Sarkozi	TKO	2 (10), 1:35	30 Dec 2017	Csigahaz Muvelodesi Kozpont, Kistarcsa, Hungary	Won vacant UBO Inter-Continental bantamweight title
6	Win	5–0–1	Krisztian Horvath	TKO	1 (4), 1:20	23 Sep 2017	Budapest Fight Center, Budapest, Hungary	
5	Win	4–0–1	Patrik Bartos	PTS	4	8 Oct 2016	Harrow Leisure Centre, London, England	
4	Draw	3–0–1	Juan Hinostroza	PTS	4	4 Mar 2016	The Halls, Norwich, England	
3	Win	3–0	David Koos	PTS	4	30 Oct 2015	Harrow Leisure Centre, London, England	
2	Win	2–0	Brett Fidoe	PTS	4	17 Jul 2015	York Hall, London, England	
1	Win	1–0	Patrik Kovac	TKO	1 (4), 1:30	14 Mar 2015	York Hall, London, England	
