= Michael Ebo Danquah =

Ghanaian boxer

Personal information
- Nickname: Ebo Torai (alias)
- Nationality: Ghanaian
- Born: Ghana
- Weight: light fly/fly/super fly/bantamweight

Boxing career
- Stance: Orthodox

Boxing record
- Total fights: 26
- Wins: 15 (KO 10)
- Losses: 9 (KO 7)
- Draws: 2

Michael Ebo Danquah is a Ghanaian professional light fly/fly/super fly/bantamweight boxer of the 1980s and '90s who won the ABU light flyweight title, WBC International light flyweight title, and Commonwealth light flyweight title, and was a challenger for the WBC International super flyweight title against Torsak Pongsupa, and ABU bantamweight title against Ernest Koffi, His professional fighting weight varied from 108 lb (49 kg; 7 st 10 lb), i.e. light flyweight to 115 1/4 lb (52.3 kg; 8 st 3.3 lb), i.e. bantamweight.
