= Igor Mikhalkin =

Russian boxer

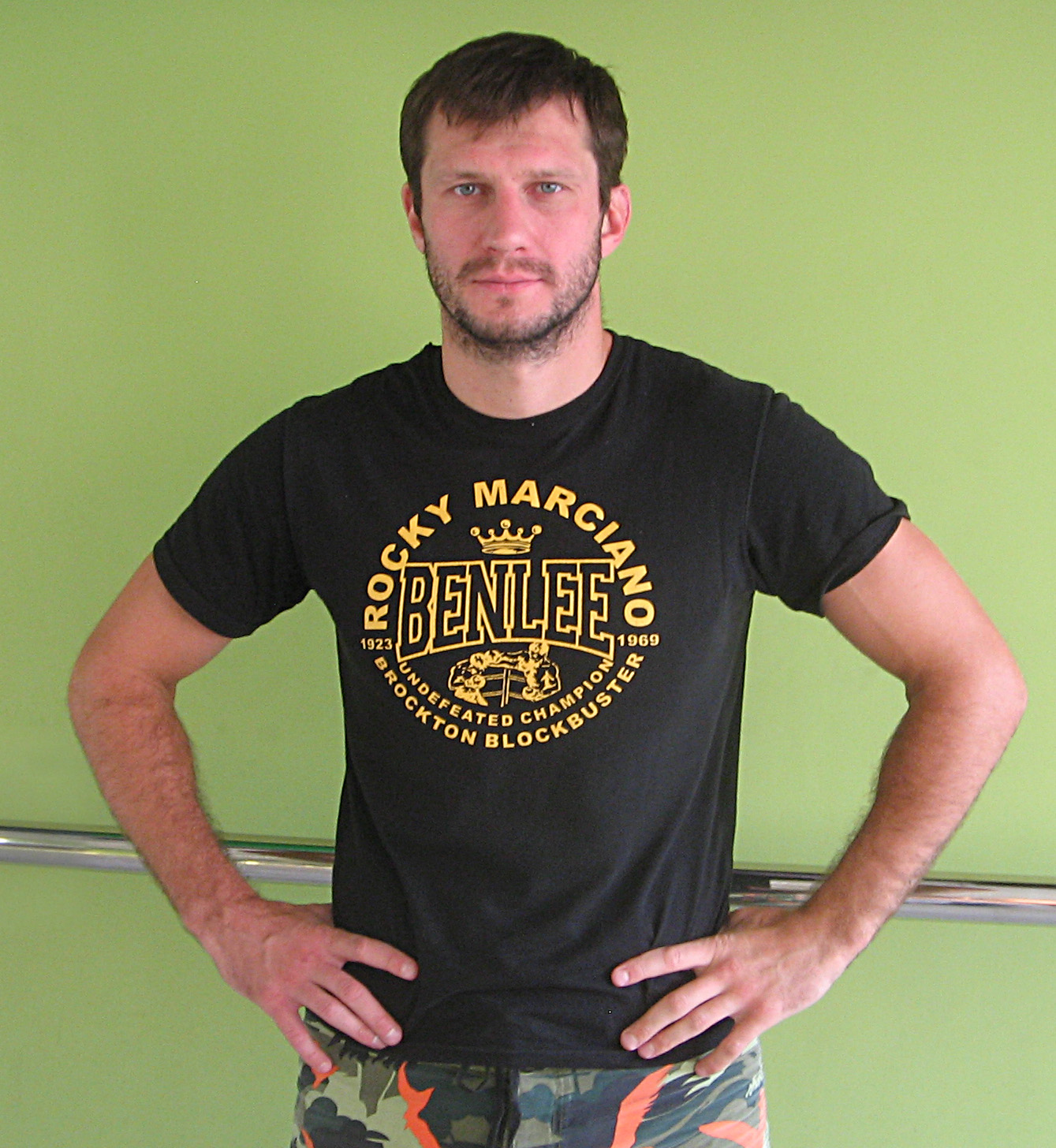

Personal information
- Nationality: Russian
- Born: Igor Gennadyevich Mikhalkin; 31 May 1985 (age 41) Irkutsk, Russia
- Height: 1.85 m (6 ft 1 in)
- Weight: Light-heavyweight

Boxing career
- Reach: 1.91 m (75 in)
- Stance: Southpaw

Boxing record
- Total fights: 28
- Wins: 25
- Win by KO: 11
- Losses: 3

Igor Gennadyevich Mikhalkin (Russian: Игорь Геннадьевич Михалкин; born 31 May 1985) is a Russian professional boxer. He held the IBO light-heavyweight title from 2017 to 2018 and challenged once for the WBO light-heavyweight title in 2018. At regional level, he held the European light-heavyweight title between 2014 and 2016.

== Professional career ==
Mikhalkin made his professional debut in November 2007. On his 12th professional contest, he suffered a loss to Aleksy Kuziemski. In April 2014, Mikhalkin defeated Mohamed Belkacem by unanimous decision to claim the European light-heavyweight title. He made three successful defenses of that title, with the last coming against Patrick Bois in March 2016. During his tenure as European champion, Mikhalkin was highly ranked by the IBF.

Prior to his continental title defense against Bois, Mikhalkin tested positive and admitted to taking meldonium, a substance banned by WADA and was stripped by the EBU. He was also banned for two years by the EBU. The suspension was lifted in November of that same year.

=== Mikhalkin vs. Oosthuizen ===
In May 2017, Mikhalkin defeated Thomas Oosthuizen to claim the IBO light-heavyweight title.

=== Mikhalkin vs. Kovalev ===
On March 3, 2018, Mikhalkin challenged WBO light heavyweight champion Sergey Kovalev for his belt. Kovalev defeated Mikhalkin in the seventh round via TKO.

=== Mikhalkin vs. Bauderlique ===
On September 10, 2021, Mikhalkin fought Mathieu Bauderlique, ranked #5 by the WBC, #9 by the IBF, #10 by the WBA and #12 by the WBA at light heavyweight. Mikhalkin lost the bout after retiring at the end of the seventh round.

== Professional boxing record ==
28 fights	25 wins	3 losses
By knockout	11	2
By decision	14	1

No.	Result	Record	Opponent	Type	Round, time	Date	Location	Notes
28	Win	25–3	(Russia) Dilmurod Satybaldiev	UD	10	12 Nov 2022	USC Soviet Wings, Moscow, Russia	
27	Loss	24–3	(France) Mathieu Bauderlique	RTD	7 (12), 3:00	10 Sep 2021	Roland Garros, Paris, France	For vacant European light-heavyweight title
26	Win	24–2	(Russia) Denis Tsaryuk	TKO	4 (8), 2:17	20 Mar 2021	Khodynka Ice Palace, Moscow, Russia	
25	Win	23–2	(Russia) Timur Nikarkhoev	UD	12	6 Jul 2019	CU Arena Neugraben, Hamburg, Germany	Won IBO interim light-heavyweight title
24	Win	22–2	(Germany) Bernard Donfack	RTD	1 (10), 3:00	8 Sep 2018	Zinnowitz, Germany	
23	Loss	21–2	(Russia) Sergey Kovalev	TKO	7 (12), 2:25	3 Mar 2018	(United States) The Theater at Madison Square Garden, New York City, New York, US	Lost IBO light-heavyweight title; For WBO light-heavyweight title
22	Win	21–1	(France) Doudou Ngumbu	UD	12	2 Dec 2017	La Palestre, Le Cannet, France	Retained IBO light-heavyweight title
21	Win	20–1	(South Africa) Thomas Oosthuizen	UD	12	19 May 2017	Barclaycard Arena, Hamburg, Germany	Won vacant IBO light-heavyweight title
20	Win	19–1	(Ukraine) Yevgeni Makhteienko	UD	8	18 Mar 2017	Baltiska Hallen, Malmö, Sweden	
19	Win	18–1	(France) Patrick Bois	UD	12	12 Mar 2016	Palais des sports Marcel Cerdan, Levallois-Perret, France	Retained European light-heavyweight title
18	Win	17–1	(France) Hugo Kasperski	UD	12	9 Oct 2015	Maison des Sports, Clermont-Ferrand, France	Retained European light-heavyweight title
17	Win	16–1	(France) Hakim Chioui	KO	9 (12)	14 Mar 2014	Salle Dubois-Crance, Charleville-Mézières, France	Retained European light-heavyweight title
16	Win	15–1	(Switzerland) Mohamed Belkacem	TD	8 (12)	11 Apr 2014	Universal Hall, Berlin, Germany	Won vacant European light-heavyweight title; Unanimous TD
15	Win	14–1	(France) Doudou Ngumbu	SD	12	5 Jul 2013	Palais Omnisports de Thiais, Paris, France	Won WBO Inter-Continental light-heavyweight title
14	Win	13–1	(Uganda) Hamza Wandera	TKO	6 (8), 2:55	18 Sep 2012	Varshavka Sky, Moscow, Russia	
13	Win	12–1	(Germany) Yavuz Keles	PTS	6	7 Jul 2012	Boxsporthalle Braamkamp, Hamburg, Germany	
12	Loss	11–1	(Poland) Aleksy Kuziemski	UD	10	22 May 2010	Stadthalle, Rostock, Germany	For vacant German International light-heavyweight title
11	Win	11–0	(France) Doudou Ngumbu	MD	8	19 Dec 2009	Sport and Congress Center, Schwerin, Germany	
10	Win	10–0	(France) Karim Bennama	UD	8	6 Jun 2009	Koenig Pilsener Arena, Oberhausen, Germany	
9	Win	9–0	(France) Jose Tavares	UD	6	20 Mar 2009	Sporthalle, Hamburg, Germany	
8	Win	8–0	(United States) DeAndrey Abron	TKO	2 (6), 1:34	7 Mar 2009	Freiberger Arena, Dresden, Germany	
7	Win	7–0	(Russia) Sergey Beloshapkin	KO	4 (8), 2:59	10 Jan 2009	Bordelandhalle, Magdeburg, Germany	
6	Win	6–0	(Brazil) Emmanoel Martins da Silva	KO	3 (6), 2:36	15 Nov 2008	Burg-Waechter Castello, Düsseldorf, Germany	
5	Win	5–0	(Germany) Patrick Linkert	TKO	3 (4)	10 Oct 2008	Mittellandhalle, Barleben, Germany	
4	Win	4–0	(Poland) Mariusz Radziszewski	UD	4	11 Jul 2008	Rundturnhalle, Cuxhaven, Germany	
3	Win	3–0	(Hungary) Mihaly Kratki	TKO	2 (4), 2:32	16 May 2008	Ballhaus Arena, Aschersleben, Germany	
2	Win	2–0	(Slovakia) Richard Remen	KO	1 (4), 2:11	4 Dec 2007	Freizeit Arena, Sölden, Austria	
1	Win	1–0	(Slovakia) Stefan Stanko	TKO	2 (4), 1:11	30 Nov 2007	DM-Arena, Karlsruhe, Germany	

Minor world boxing titles
Vacant Title last held by Umar Salamov	IBO light heavyweight champion May 19, 2017 – March 14, 2018; Vacated	Vacant Title next held by Karo Murat
