= Brandon Gonzáles =

American boxer

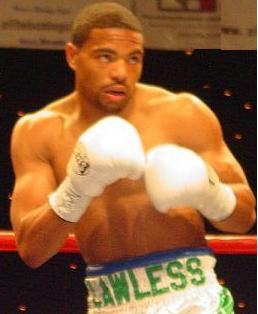

Personal information
- Nickname: Flawless
- Born: Brandon Gilbert Gonzáles; May 24, 1984 (age 42) Portland, Oregon, U.S.
- Height: 6 ft 0 in (183 cm)
- Weight: Super Middleweight; Middleweight

Boxing career
- Reach: 74 in (188 cm)
- Stance: Orthodox

Boxing record
- Total fights: 21
- Wins: 18
- Win by KO: 10
- Losses: 1
- Draws: 1
- No contests: 1

Brandon Gilbert Gonzáles (born May 24, 1984) is an American former professional boxer. As an amateur, he was the top rated U.S. middleweight. He is of Mexican and African American heritage.

== Amateur career ==
Gonzales began boxing at 19 as a U.S. National Team member and went to have an amateur record of 56–7. He won the 2004 Golden Gloves, was a Finalist at the 2005 U.S. National Championships and was ranked as America's No. 1 ranked light heavyweight amateur boxer. Slated for the US Olympic Team in 2004 he withdrew to begin his professional career in 2007. While boxing as an amateur he worked as a janitor at Arco Arena.

== Professional career ==
On January 29, 2010 Gonzales won a fight against veteran Dumont Welliver by T.K.O., the fight was on the undercard of ESPN's Friday Night Fights. He maintained an unblemished streak of 17 wins until his bout with Thomas Oosthuizen that resulted in a draw.

On October 28, 2011, he defeated Ossie Duran in the Main Event on Showtime's ShoBox at Bally's in Atlantic City, New Jersey.

In 2014 Gonzales signed a promotional agreement with Gary Shaw Productions. He suffered his first loss to James DeGale at Wembley Stadium on 31 May 2014 in an IBF final eliminator. This was Gonzales's final fight and he now runs a boxing and fitness gym in California.

== Professional record ==
18 Wins (10 knockouts), 1 Loss (1 knockout), 1 Draw
Res.	Record	Opponent	Type	Rd., Time	Date	Location	Notes
Loss	18–1-1	(United Kingdom) James Degale	TKO	4(12)	May 31, 2014	(United Kingdom) Wembley Stadium, Wembley, London	
Win	18-0-1	(United States) Jonathan Nelson	UD	10(10)	Nov 16, 2013	Citizens Business Bank Arena, Ontario, California	
Draw	17-0-1	(South Africa) Thomas Oosthuizen	SD	10(10)	Jun 29, 2013	MGM Grand at Foxwoods Resort, Mashantucket, Connecticut	
Win	17-0-0	(United States) Don Mouton	UD	8 (8)	Jan 11, 2013	Pueblo Pavilion, Santa Fe, New Mexico	
Win	16-0-0	(Haiti) Elie Augustama	UD	8 (8)	Jun 22, 2012	Soboba Casino, San Jacinto, California	
Win	15-0-0	(Ghana) Ossie Duran	SD	8 (8)	Oct 28, 2011	Bally's Event Center, Atlantic City, New Jersey	
Win	14-0-0	(Cuba) Lester González	UD	8 (8)	Jan 7, 2011	Allan Witt Sports Center, Fairfield, California	
Win	13-0-0	(United States) Byron Tyson	TKO	3 (6), (1:31)	Aug 28, 2010	Churchill Park, Fallon, Nevada	
Win	12-0-0	(United States) Isiah McFadden	UD	6 (6)	May 22, 2010	Grand Sierra Resort, Reno, Nevada	
Win	11-0-0	(United States) Darnell Boone	UD	8 (8)	Mar 19, 2010	Grand Sierra Resort, Reno, Nevada	
Win	10-0-0	(United States) Dumont Welliver	TKO	2 (6), (1:25)	Jan 29, 2010	Grand Sierra Resort, Reno, Nevada	
Win	9-0-0	(United States) Victor Villereal	TKO	4 (6), (2:55)	Dec 11, 2009	Grand Sierra Resort, Reno, Nevada	
Win	8-0-0	(United States) Ray Craig	KO	1 (6), (2:32)	May 21, 2009	ARCO Arena, Sacramento, California	
Win	7-0-0	(United States) Jason Dietrich	TKO	3 (8), (0:15)	Jan 29, 2009	Red Lion Hotel, Sacramento, California	
Win	6-0-0	(Canada) Andy Mavros	UD	6 (6)	Jan 9, 2009	Buffalo Bill's Star Arena, Primm, Nevada	
NC	5-0-0	(Canada) Daniel Stanislavjevic	NC	1 (1:30)	Sep 26, 2008	Morongo Casino Resort, Cabazon, California	
Win	5-0-0	(United States) Billy Bailey	KO	6 (6), (0:40)	Jul 31, 2008	Red Lion Hotel, Sacramento, California	
Win	4-0-0	(United States) Mike Alexander	TKO	2 (4), (2:05)	May 15, 2008	Red Lion Hotel, Sacramento, California	
Win	3-0-0	(United States) Flavio Cardoza	KO	1 (4), (0:22)	Feb 27, 2008	Red Lion Hotel, Sacramento, California	
Win	2-0-0	(Mexico) Angel Polanco	KO	1 (4), (2:08)	Aug 11, 2007	ARCO Arena, Sacramento, California	
Win	1-0-0	(United States) Yonas Gebreegziabher	TKO	1 (4), (2:50)	Feb 22, 2007	Radisson Hotel, Sacramento, California	
