= Torsak Pongsupa =

Thai boxer

Personal information
- Nickname: Singha
- Nationality: Thai
- Born: Torsak Pongsupa; 23 November 1968 (age 57) Bangkok, Thailand
- Weight: Super flyweight Junior featherweight

Boxing career
- Stance: Southpaw

Boxing record
- Total fights: 30
- Wins: 27
- Win by KO: 17
- Losses: 3
- Draws: 0
- No contests: 0

Torsak Pongsupa (Thai: ต่อศักดิ์ ผ่องสุภา; born 23 November 1968), also known as Torsak Sasiprapa (ต่อศักดิ์ ศศิประภายิม), is a retired Thai professional boxer who held of the WBF Junior featherweight World Champion in late 1990s.

== Biography and career ==
Pongsupa was born in the Lat Phrao neighbourhood of Bangkok, in what was then Tambon Bang Kapi, Phaya Thai District, now part of Bang Kapi District. His father, Capt. Chanai Pongsupa, owned the "Sasiprapa" boxing and Muay Thai gym, and also served as a coach and manager for the Thai national amateur boxing team in the 1980s. Pongsupa graduated from Bangkapi School and later earned a bachelor's degree from Bangkok University.

He began his boxing career in the amateur ranks and achieved significant success in the youth division. He eventually joined the national team and represented Thailand at the 1988 Summer Olympics in Seoul. However, his Olympic journey ended when he was defeated by Vichairachanon Khadpo, then known as Vichai Khadpo, by referee stoppage due to a bleeding eyebrow that forced him to withdraw from the fight. After this setback, he transitioned to professional boxing.

As a professional fighter, Pongsupa won seven of his first eight bouts, suffering only one loss to fellow Thai boxer Thanomsak Sithbaobay. He later captured the WBC Super Flyweight International title by defeating Filipino boxer Dadoy Andujar, and went on to defend the title three times. One of his most notable defenses was against Ghanaian boxer Michael Ebo Danquah at the Thai Army Sports Stadium on Vibhavadi Rangsit Road in Bangkok.

On December 22, 1991, Pongsupa challenged South Korea's Moon Sung-kil for the WBC Super Flyweight world title at the Indoor Gymnasium in Incheon. He lost the fight by technical knockout in the sixth round. In later interviews, Pongsupa spoke about the difficult conditions he faced, including being placed in a large, unheated gym with only a single portable heater that he had to share with Ricardo López, another boxer on the undercard. He also claimed that Moon may have exceeded the 115-pound weight limit during the weigh-in, but the bout was allowed to proceed anyway.

Following this loss, Pongsupa stepped away from boxing and took a job in public relations at Osotspa Company. He eventually returned to the ring under the management of Orathai Kanchanachoosak. On May 11, 1996, he won the WBF Junior Featherweight world title by majority decision against Australian boxer Tony Wehbee in a match held at Ratchawong Pier in Bangkok's Chinatown area.

His comeback was not just about personal ambition. It was an attempt to bring international boxing recognition to Sasiprapa Gym, the family-owned training camp founded by his father. The gym had already produced champions in Muay Thai, but had never had a world titleholder in western boxing. Although the WBF was a relatively minor boxing organization, claiming its belt still meant something significant. For Pongsupa, it was not so much about the prestige of the title, but about writing a new chapter in the gym's history.

After defending the title twice, Pongsupa retired from professional boxing. He then became a trainer at Sasiprapa Gym, continuing his family's contribution to the sport.
