= Modesty Napunyi =

Kenyan boxer

Personal information
- Nickname: Yushin Napunyi (alias)
- Nationality: Kenyan
- Born: Modest Napunyi Oduori; 13 March 1957 Nairobi, Kenya
- Died: 20 December 2002 (aged 45) Nairobi Hospital, Kenya
- Weight: feather/super bantam/ feather/super featherweight

Boxing career
- Stance: Orthodox

Boxing record
- Total fights: 22
- Wins: 15 (KO 9)
- Losses: 7 (KO 1)
- Draws: 0

Modesty Napunyi (13 March 1957 — 20 December 2002 (aged 45)) born in Nairobi, was a Kenyan amateur featherweight and professional super bantam/ feather/super featherweight boxer of the 1970s, '80s and '90s who made his international amateur début in the 1975 Brunner Urafiki tournament between Kenya and Uganda, he was voted the best boxer during the 1981 King's Cup in Bangkok, Thailand, and won the Japanese featherweight title, East & Central African Professional Boxing Federation super bantamweight title, African Boxing Union (ABU) super bantamweight title, ABU featherweight title, and Commonwealth featherweight title, his professional fighting weight varied from 122 lb (55 kg; 8 st 10 lb), i.e. super bantamweight to 127 1/2 lb (57.8 kg; 9 st 1.5 lb), i.e. super featherweight.
