= Dobsonville Shopping Centre =

Building in South Africa

Dobsonville Mall
- Location: Dobsonville, Johannesburg, South Africa
- Coordinates: 26.22376°S 27.87251°E

Dobsonville Mall is a shopping centre in Johannesburg, South Africa. Located in Dobsonville, it was the first shopping centre to be built in Soweto and was seen as an early symbol of economic development in the area.
