= Arthur Blaxall =

Arthur William Blaxall (15 May 1891 – 5 December 1970) was a British South African Anglican priest who for most of his life lived and worked in South Africa especially known for his ministry among the blind and the deaf.

== Biography ==
Arthur William Blaxall was born in Britain on 15 May 1891. He served in World War I as a medical orderly, worked as a missioner to the deaf in Birmingham and went to South Africa in 1923, together with his wife Florence. He founded the Ezenzeleni workshop for the blind at Roodepoort in 1939.

In 1954, he founded the Arthur Blaxall School for the Blind, but it was forced to change its name when he was exiled for his opposition to the National Party government in 1964.

In the 1960s, he was secretary of the South African branch of the Fellowship of Reconciliation, a pacifist organisation. He was invited by Nelson Mandela to visit him whilst he awaited trial, which he did on three occasions when they prayed together. In 1963, he was charged with various offences under the Suppression of Communism Act, and given a suspended sentence, mainly on grounds of his age, and went into exile in the UK.

== Publications ==
- The Visit of Helen Keller to South Africa. SA National Council for the Blind. 1951.
- Suspended Sentence. Hodder and Stoughton. 1965. His autobiography written in exile in England.
- Between Two Mill Stones. The Coloured People of South Africa. London. 1932.
- Ezenzeleni, the Place where You Work for Yourself. 1939.
- Handicapped. Being Three Short Essays on the Deaf, the Blind and the Doubly-handicapped. Pretoria. 1934.
- Wake Up South Africa!: An Essay. South African Fellowship of Reconciliation. 1963.
- Blindness His Servant. [On Robert Walter Bowen. With Portraits.]. SA National Council for the Blind. 1949.
