= Dobsonville =

- Location within Gauteng Location within South Africa
- Coordinates: 26°13′26″S 27°51′49″E
- Country: South Africa
- Province: Gauteng
- Municipality: City of Johannesburg

Area
  - Total: 2.73 km^{2} (1.05 sq mi)

Population (2011)
  - Total: 40,328
  - Density: 14,800/km^{2} (38,300/sq mi)

Racial makeup (2011)
  - Black African: 99.1%
  - Coloured: 0.4%
  - Indian/Asian: 0.1%
  - White: 0.1%
  - Other: 0.3%

First languages (2011)
  - Tswana: 38.2%
  - Zulu: 22.1%
  - Xhosa: 14.9%
  - Sotho: 7.4%
  - Other: 17.4%
- Time zone: UTC+2 (SAST)
- Postal code (street): 1863
- PO box: 1865
- Website: http://dobsonville.co.za/

Dobsonville is a township in greater Soweto, Johannesburg, South Africa. It lies to the west of Meadowlands, a part of Diepmeadow, and is adjacent to Mofolo North and Zondi, which are suburbs of Soweto on its southern border.

== Description ==
The first shopping centre in Soweto, Dobsonville Shopping Centre, is located in Dobsonville. It has many small suburbs within it, including extensions 1, 2 and 3, Mmesi Park, Snake Park (Thulani), and many others. It has many primary and high schools, including Hector Peterson Primary School, which was built in memory of Hector Pieterson.

There are recreational facilities such as Dorothy Nyembe Park, a local library, and a swimming pool. Opposite the swimming pool is Dobsonville stadium. Kopanong community hall and the municipal offices can be found close by. Other amenities include a recycling centre, a police station, and a public health clinic. There are many businesses in Dobsonville that range from franchise restaurants to street vendors who sell anything from cellphone chargers to traditional herbs and medicines to sweets and fruit.

== History ==
Dobsonville was formerly under the Roodepoort Municipality until 1994, when it was merged with Soweto. It is an important but understudied suburb of Soweto. Its roots lie in the "old location" in Roodepoort. Between 1955 and 1967, this location was gradually destroyed through government forced removals. The old location was known for the strong presence and influence of many churches. While the removals were not particularly noted for resistance (perhaps because of the violence with which resistance to removals was met with in Sophiatown), the links between the old location and Dobsonville remained strong and emotive.

The cemetery of the old location in Roodepoort West, for example, maintained a physical link between old and new location. While some heritage projects and research around the histories of the old Roodepoort location were undertaken, there has been little work on the history of Dobsonville itself. More than 100 oral testimonies of Dobsonville residents have been collected by researchers from the Wits History Workshop at the University of the Witwatersrand for their Dobsonville History Project. However, some oral interviews remain unpublished. See "Return to Juliwe Cemetery: A Community Journey" Article by Eric Itzkin 6 April 2019. The research was conducted by Wits History Workshop researchers: 1. Prof. Phil Bonner. 2. Dr. Michelle Hay. 3. Mr. Sello Mathabatha. 4. Dr. Tshepo Moloi. 5. Prof. Noor Nieftagodien. 6. Mr Muzomuhle Caluza.(Intern)

== The St Ansgars Swedish Mission ==
Complex in Roodepoort West: East of the Westgate Shopping Mall over Ontdekkers Road and bordered by Pheasant Street and Crous Drive was the area where the above complex was situated. The area has changed from what it looked like before the removals where many residents of Roodepoort West Location (Juliwe) earned their living one way or another. The history of the area is largely ignored or unknown to historians. The complex was home to: (a)The St Ansgars Swedish Institution, established in 1913 and closed in 1958. (b) The Ezenzeleni School for the Blind, established in 1939 by Arthur William Blaxall. Later moved to Pretoria. (c) The Kutlwanong School for the Deaf and Dumb, established in 1939 Precursor to Sizwile School for the Deaf in Dobsonville. (Suzan Kabane interviewed by Dr. Tshepo Moloi, WITS) (d) The Margaret Ballinger Home for Crippled or Orphaned Children, established in 1948 by Margaret Ballinger (teacher and politician) (e) The Wilgespruit Fellowship Centre Established in 1948 and hotbed of struggle politics of the 70s and 80s. (f) MSAHO: The International Library of African Music. (Hugh Tracey - Rhodes University)

The complex was an extended part of the Roodepoort West Location with the St Ansgars Institution "The Lovedale College of Roodepoort" at the center. Some renowned South Africans passed through the gates of this once illustrious institution. The schools of Ezenzeleni or Kutlwanong, creations of clergyman, Father William Blaxall, were places of hope for the disabled persons of Roodepoort West Location and South Africa at large. The Wilgespruit Fellowship Centre was, as indicated above, the political struggle Institution which further gave impetus to the freedom struggles of South Africa's Black Population. Lastly, Hugh Tracey, collector of many African music genres, and Eric Gallo set up a vinyl record pressing plant at Msaho in the very early 1950s. The first of its kind in South Africa, it created employment for many residents of the location (township). In the foreground of photo No 4 (Aerial Photograph taken in 1967 after demolition of Juliwe Township) In Eric Itzkins Article "Return To Juliwe: A Community Journey" Bordered by a line of trees, is an open veld crisscrossed by footpaths, stands today 7-1-20 the Westgate Shopping Mall, the veld being called "Mr. Browns Farm" by neighbouring residents of the location (township). The border is still visible and noticeable next to the Ontdekkers Road off-ramp circle into the mall from Johannesburg. Beyond the straight line of trees and southwest of the St Ansgars Mission Complex is the location of Roodepoort West, the suburb of Horizon View.

== Roodepoort Location ==
Like its sister locations on the Reef, the evolution of the location was, in many respects, the same. Before its removal as a "Black Spot" to Dobsonville (so named after Denis Dobson, Location Superintendent at the dawn of the removals) it had evolved for more than 50 years with its multi-ethnic inhabitants much like its sister locations. Just like in every community, adversity has to be overcome by various means, by religion, the arts, politics, sport, business and so on. Like in very community or society there will be outstanding individuals or groups of individuals who will triumph over adversity. We will try as best as we can, to focus on the day-to-day lives of the inhabitants, the conditions under which they had to survive. The laws that controlled their lives. Their contributions to the development of the economies of the town they lived in. 'The Survey of Reef Locations' gives us a remote picture of the state of affairs in Roodepoort Location in the mid to late 1930s. From that can be deduced the "primitive" sport facilities that had to be utilized by sportsmen of the location, for example.

There was, for example, the menace of multi-ethnic criminal gangs who would turn against each other along ethnic lines later in Dobsonville ("The Black Swines") in the Nguni Section and ("The Apaches") in the Tswana Section. These being former neighbours in the Roodepoort Location Their demise would be brought about by the eruption of the June 1976 student riots. Things would never be the same for the gangs. The recognition given to Piet "Oom Piet" Gwele is no fluke. Gwele, (longtime inhabitant of Roodepoort West Location) and father of celebrated Jazz Pianist Boycie "Piano Fingers" Gwele pioneered the game of Cricket on the Rand. Having played the game in the Eastern Cape early last century, on to the diamond field of Kimberly, and finally to the Rand (Rand Leases/Gold Mine). His contribution to African Cricket on the Rand in the 1930s and 1940s is unsurpassed. During his cricketing career, he had groomed the likes of prolific all-rounder Samson Ntshekisa and the mecurical Sydney Hashe, to name but a few. Gwele was also instrumental in the formation of the Cup Winning Local Cricket Club "DobsonXI" Gwele's remains lie in the Juliwe Cemetery, Horizon View. Roodepoort. Ntshekisa and Hashe's remains lie in the Doornkop Cemetery, in Dobsonville. The bread and butter sport of football in Native Locations (Townships) is extensively written about elsewhere and its not dealt with in this article. "Khawuleza" meaning (Hurry Mama Hurry)

International singer and songwriter Mirriam Makeba, in singing this song, later beautifully improvised by equally world renowned jazz trumpeter Hugh Masekela would have seen the worst of the dark days of the Liquor and Bantu Beer Prohibition in the locations and slums of the log drawn-out war about (Bantu Beer, Barbeton, Skokiaan, Pineapple etc.) between the "Authorities" and shebeen queens of the Rand, which started as far back as the sunrise of gold and coal mining on the Witwatersrand. A somewhat more detailed account of this war is dealt with by (Eales). The authorities would finally win the day in the lucrative African beer brewing and selling business in almost every "Native" (as they were called then) Location on the Reef. The livelihoods of many an African woman (especially the Shebeen Queens) would die a slow death. Naturally, booze and music go together, starting with (Marabi of the 1930s to Tsaba - Tsaba of the 1940s and Kwela of the 1950s) and being an attractive element in the patronage of Shebeens in Roodepoort West Location (Juliwe). A vivid picture of this scenario is elegantly captured in (Allen's) work. The role of the "Church Music" will be dealt with later in the article.

Many former residents, in their oral testimonies, have fondly reminisced about the good old days of the local "Edwin Fieldhouse Hall", a recreational centre of the location. Rev Fieldhouse was mayor of Roodepoort 1947-1948 and was instrumental, together with D.W. Mooki and T. Huddleston in the establishment of that famous high school "Orlando High School". As we attempt to deal with the evolution of Roodepoort West "Native" Location (Later to become the township of Dobsonville) up to the forced removals, it is important to refer the reader to the entire work by B.E. Mongalo. His is an enlightened account of how some of these "townships" on the Witwatersrand came into being and their very early years from "Native" concentration camps to "Native" Locations to Black Townships.

It is hoped that historians will further research and interrogate the history of these "Native" concentration camps as very little is written about them compared to the "White" Camps though their histories are brought about by the same subject. However, there is renewed enquiry by various parties to unravel the histories of these camps which later became today's black townships. We submit that the Roodepoort Location started out as one of these camps. Further research is needed and remote traces of this are in the "Juliwe" Cemetery in Horizon View Suburb in Roodepoort. The reader is also referred to "The Annual Report for the year ended 30th June 1903" by the Transvaal Commissioner for "Native" Affairs.
