= Fariz Mammadov =

Azerbaijani boxer

Fariz Mammadov Fariz Məmmədov
Personal information
- Nationality: Azerbaijani
- Born: April 15, 1980 (age 46) Aghdam, Azerbaijani SSR, USSR
- Height: 5 ft 6 in (1.68 m)
- Weight: Welterweight

Boxing career
- Stance: Orthodox

Boxing record
- Total fights: 22
- Wins: 19
- Win by KO: 13
- Losses: 2
- Draws: 1
- No contests: 0

Fariz Mammadov (Azerbaijani: Fariz Məmmədov) (born April 15, 1980 Aghdam, USSR) is an Azerbaijani professional boxer and current European welterweight champion with the World Boxing Organization.

In 2016, Fariz became the WBO and WBF world champion, defeating an opponent from Uganda by knockout in the 12th round.

== Professional career ==
On 4 June 2014, he gained the European welterweight title in the WBO after knocking out Matthias Pelk of Germany.

== Personal life ==
He has been practicing Islam since he was around the age of 25.
