= Percy Commey =

Ghanaian boxer

Personal information
- Nationality: Ghanaian
- Born: Percy Oblitei Commey; 7 February 1960 (age 66) Accra, Ghana
- Height: 5 ft 9 in (1.75 m)
- Weight: feather/super featherweight

Boxing career

Boxing record
- Total fights: 42
- Wins: 34 (KO 18)
- Losses: 7 (KO 3)
- Draws: 1

Percy Commey (born 7 February 1960, in Accra) is a Ghanaian professional feather/super featherweight boxer of the 1970s, '80s, '90s and 2000s who won the Ghanaian featherweight title, African Boxing Union featherweight, and Commonwealth featherweight title, and was a challenger for the Ghanaian super featherweight title, and West African Boxing Union super featherweight title against Smith Odoom, his professional fighting weight varied from 123 lb (56 kg; 8 st 11 lb), i.e. featherweight to 127 lb (58 kg; 9 st 1 lb), i.e. super featherweight.

== Early Life and Family Background ==
Percy Oblitei Commey, known as Percy Commey, was born on February 7, 1960, in Accra, Ghana.

Commey comes from a family with a strong background in Ghanaian boxing. His grandfather, Oblitei Commey, was an early figure in the sport and won national and African championships in the 1960s. Commey later became the uncle of Joseph Commey, a Ghanaian boxer who won a silver medal at the 2022 Commonwealth Games and a gold medal at the 2024 African Games.

Commey grew up in Accra during the 1960s, after Ghana gained independence. This period started with economic hope under President Kwame Nkrumah but later faced problems such as rising prices, foreign debt, and political instability. Sports, especially boxing, were popular in cities like Accra and gave young people opportunities during these difficult times. Because his family was involved in boxing, Commey was introduced to the sport early and naturally developed an interest in it.
