= Willbeforce Shihepo =

Namibian boxer (born 1983)

Personal information
- Nickname: Black Mamba
- Nationality: Namibian
- Born: Willbeforce Shihepo; January 9, 1983 (age 43) Onamahoka, Namibia
- Height: 1.86 m (6 ft 1 in)

Boxing career
- Stance: Orthodox

Boxing record
- Total fights: 40
- Wins: 25
- Win by KO: 18
- Losses: 15
- Draws: 0

Willbeforce Shihepo (born January 9, 1983) is a Namibian professional boxer.

== Career ==
On 6 December 2013, Shihepo defeated Daniel Wanyonyi in Windhoek for the vacant WBO Africa super middleweight title.

== Professional boxing record ==
40 fights	25 wins	15 losses
By knockout	18	5
By decision	7	9
By disqualification	0	1

No.	Result	Record	Opponent	Type	Round, time	Date	Location	Notes
40	Loss	25–15	Deion Jumah	PTS	4	26 Feb 2022	Circus Tavern, Purfleet, England	
39	Loss	25–14	Viddal Riley	PTS	6	19 Feb 2022	Manchester Arena, Manchester, England	
38	Loss	25–13	David Gladun	TKO	4 (8), 2:01	28 Aug 2021	Floyd Mayweather Boxing Academy, Zhukovka, Russia	
37	Loss	25–12	Thabiso Mchunu	RTD	2 (10), 3:00	20 Oct 2019	Time Square, Menlyn, Pretoria, Gauteng, South Africa	
36	Loss	25–11	Akani Phuzi	MD	12	14 Jul 2019	Blairgowrie Recreation Centre, Randburg, Gauteng, South Africa	vacant WBA Pan African cruiserweight title
35	Loss	25–10	Alexei Papin	TKO	8 (12), 0:24	23 Jun 2018	Floyd Mayweather Boxing Academy, Zhukovka, Russia	vacant IBF International cruiserweight title
34	Win	25–9	Mussa Ajibu	TKO	3 (8), 0:24	7 Apr 2018	Windhoek Show Grounds, Windhoek, Namibia	
33	Win	24–9	Anos Temfuma	UD	6	30 Sep 2017	Paresis Stadium, Otjiwarongo, Namibia	
32	Loss	23–9	Callum Johnson	KO	9 (12), 2:07	24 Sep 2016	Manchester Arena (formerly M.E.N Arena), Manchester, Lancashire, United Kingdom	vacant Commonwealth (British Empire) light heavyweight title
31	Win	23–8	Maike Gogoda	KO	2 (8)	5 Dec 2015	Ramatex Factory, Windhoek, Namibia	
30	Win	22–8	Tineyi Maridzo	UD	8	4 Oct 2015	Katutura Independence Arena, Windhoek, Namibia	
29	Loss	21–8	Johnny Muller	SD	12	1 Mar 2014	Emperors Palace, Kempton Park, Gauteng, South Africa	vacant WBC International Silver light heavyweight title
28	Win	21–7	Daniel Wanyonyi	KO	6 (12)	6 Dec 2013	Windhoek Country Club Resort, Windhoek, Namibia	vacant WBO Africa super middleweight title
27	Loss	20–7	Arthur Abraham	UD	12	24 Aug 2013	Sport and Congress Center, Schwerin, Mecklenburg-Vorpommern, Germany	vacant WBO Inter-Continental super middleweight title
26	Win	20–6	Udiadia Mwahila	UD	6	8 Dec 2012	Vineta Sports Centre, Swakopmund, Namibia	
25	Win	19–6	Johannes Mwetupunga	UD	12	8 Sep 2012	Windhoek Country Club Resort, Windhoek, Namibia	interim WBO Africa super middleweight title
24	Win	18–6	Janos Olah	TKO	1 (4), 2:27	14 Jan 2012	Baden-Arena, Offenburg, Baden-Württemberg, Germany	
23	Win	17–6	Johannes Pieterson	RTD	5 (8), 3:00	5 Nov 2011	Windhoek Country Club Resort, Windhoek, Namibia	
22	Win	16–6	Sunday Ajuwa	KO	2 (12)	24 Sep 2011	Windhoek Country Club Resort, Windhoek, Namibia	interim WBO Africa super middleweight title
21	Win	15–6	Donald Kampamba	TD	9 (12), 3:00	19 Mar 2011	Windhoek Country Club Resort, Windhoek, Namibia	interim WBO Africa super middleweight title
20	Win	14–6	Innocent Kalimanshi	KO	4 (8)	24 Jul 2010	Windhoek Country Club Resort, Windhoek, Namibia	
19	Loss	13–6	Emmanuel Duma	DQ	2 (6), 2:34	22 May 2009	Windhoek Country Club Resort, Windhoek, Namibia	
18	Win	13–5	Gibson Mapfumo	KO	2 (6), 0:42	11 Dec 2008	Windhoek Country Club Resort, Windhoek, Namibia	
17	Win	12–5	Kgotso Motau	KO	1 (8)	10 Oct 2008	Bloemfontein City Hall, Bloemfontein, Free State, South Africa	
16	Win	11–5	Chamunorwa Gonorenda	TKO	3 (6)	12 Sep 2008	Windhoek Country Club Resort, Windhoek, Namibia	
15	Loss	10–5	Isaac Chilemba	PTS	6	21 Nov 2007	Emperors Palace, Kempton Park, Gauteng, South Africa	
14	Win	10–4	Tineyi Maridzo	RTD	3 (6)	11 Aug 2007	Windhoek Country Club Resort, Windhoek, Namibia	
13	Win	9–4	Isaac Chilemba	PTS	6	5 Jul 2007	Emperors Palace, Kempton Park, Gauteng, South Africa	
12	Win	8–4	Emmanuel Gala	TKO	1 (6), 1:34	20 Mar 2007	Windhoek Country Club Resort, Windhoek, Namibia	
11	Loss	7–4	Stanyslav Kashtanov	RTD	4 (10), 3:00	23 Dec 2006	Sport Palace “Druzhba”, Donetsk, Ukraine	WBC Youth World super middleweight title
10	Loss	7–3	Stephen Nzuemba	MD	6	27 Oct 2006	Wembley Indoor Arena, Johannesburg, Gauteng, South Africa	
9	Win	7–2	Terry Ngubane	TKO	1 (6), 2:08	19 Aug 2006	Windhoek Country Club Resort, Windhoek, Namibia	
8	Win	6–2	Kabelo Ndlovu	MD	8	10 Jun 2006	Park Station Concourse, Johannesburg, Gauteng, South Africa	
7	Win	5–2	Raymond Nyathi	KO	7 (?)	20 Mar 2006	Windhoek Country Club Resort, Windhoek, Namibia	
6	Win	4–2	Banda Mathebula	KO	2 (6)	8 Dec 2005	Phakalane Golf Estate, Gaborone, Botswana	
5	Win	3–2	Samuel Mathebula	TKO	2 (4), 1:42	5 Aug 2005	Windhoek Country Club Resort, Windhoek, Namibia	
4	Win	2–2	Oupa Mahlangu	TKO	1 (?)	27 Nov 2004	Sakaria Lawala Hall, Oranjemund, Namibia	
3	Loss	1–2	Emmanuel Duma	PTS	4	16 Jun 2004	Sports Centre, Cullinan, Gauteng, South Africa	
2	Win	1–1	Joseph Jiyane	KO	1 (?)	6 Mar 2004	Windhoek, Namibia	
1	Loss	0–1	Sydwell Mokhoro	PTS	4	6 Dec 2003	Southern Suburbs Recreation Cent, Johannesburg, Gauteng, South Africa	
