= Doudou Ngumbu =

Congolese boxer (born 1982)

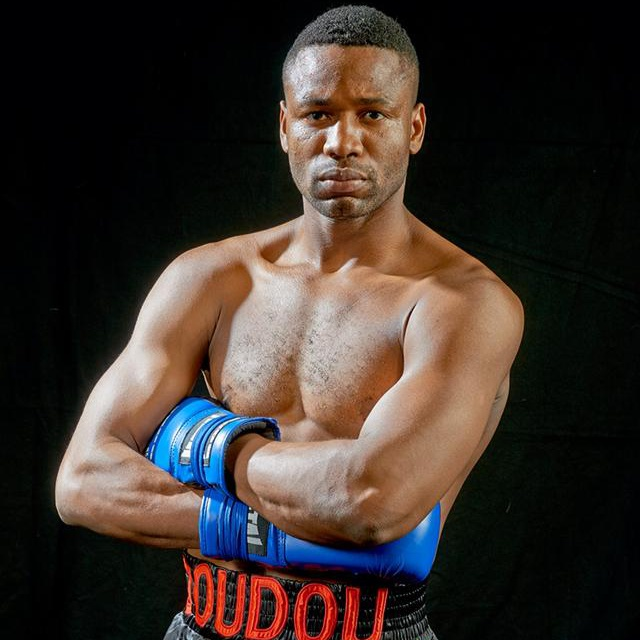

Personal information
- Nationality: French
- Born: Doudou Mapwanga Kitanda; February 6, 1982 (age 44) Kinshasa, D.R. Congo
- Height: 5 ft 11 in (180 cm)
- Weight: Light heavyweight

Boxing career
- Stance: Orthodox

Boxing record
- Total fights: 48
- Wins: 38
- Win by KO: 14
- Losses: 9

Doudou Mapwanga Kitanda Djike (born 6 February 1982) is a Congolese born French professional boxer competing in the Light heavyweight division.

== Professional career ==
Ngumbu turned professional in 2007 and won his first 20 fights with 9 stoppage victories. He would taste defeat for the first time against Malawian boxer Isaac Chilemba. He got his first shot at a title in his third fight against russian boxer Igor Mikhalkin. Ngumbu with a record of 38-8, would finally get an opportunity to fight for a major world title against WBC Light heavyweight champion Oleksandr Gvozdyk.

== Professional boxing record ==
47 fights	38 wins	9 losses
By knockout	14	2
By decision	24	7

No.	Result	Record	Opponent	Type	Round	Date	Location	Notes
47	Loss	38–9	(Ukraine) Oleksandr Gvozdyk	TKO	5 (12)	2019-03-30	(United States) 2300 Arena, Philadelphia	For WBC & Lineal Light Heavyweight titles
46	Win	38–8	(Switzerland) Yoann Kongolo	MD	12 (12)	2018-05-25	(France) Palais des Sports, Toulouse	
45	Loss	37–8	(Russia) Igor Mikhalkin	UD	12 (12)	2017-12-02	(France) La Palestre, Le Cannet	For IBO Light Heavyweight title
44	Win	37–7	(France) Jonathan Profichet	RTD	8 (12)	2017-10-21	(France) Gymnase St Exupéry, Blagnac	
43	Win	36–7	(Belgium) Bilal Laggoune	SD	12 (12)	2017-02-10	(Belgium) Belleheide Center, Pamel-Roosdaal	
42	Win	35–7	(France) Gabriel Lecrosnier	UD	6 (6)	2016-01-29	(France) Salle Polyvalente des Ramiers, Blagnac	
41	Loss	34–7	(Russia) Umar Salamov	UD	12 (12)	2015-11-14	(Ukraine) Ice Palace, Brovari	For WBO European Light Heavyweight title
40	Win	34–6	(Latvia) Andrejs Pokumeiko	TKO	4 (6)	2015-01-30	(France) Salle Polyvalente des Ramiers, Blagnac	
39	Loss	33–6	(Poland) Andrzej Fonfara	UD	10 (10)	2014-11-01	(United States) Credit Union 1 Arena, Chicago	
38	Win	33–5	(South Africa) Johnny Muller	UD	10 (10)	2014-06-21	(Monaco) Salle Médecin, Monte Carlo	
37	Win	32–5	(France) Yoann Bloyer	TKO	5 (8)	2014-06-06	(France) Salle Polyvalente des Ramiers, Blagnac	
36	Loss	31–5	(Russia) Igor Mikhalkin	SD	12 (12)	2013-07-05	(France) Palais Omnisports de Thiais, Thiais	
35	Win	31–4	(Ukraine) Vyacheslav Uzelkov	UD	12 (12)	2013-03-16	(Ukraine) Palace of Sports, Kyiv	
34	Win	30–4	(France) Yoann Bloyer	PTS	6 (6)	2012-10-26	(France) Salle Valentre, Cahors	
33	Loss	29–4	(France) Nadjib Mohammedi	TKO	5 (12)	2012-06-15	(France) Salle Jean Roure, Les Pennes-Mirabeau	
32	Win	29–3	(France) Parfait Tindani	UD	6 (6)	2012-03-03	(France) Salle du Phare, Tournefeuille	
31	Win	28–3	(Poland) Aleksy Kuziemski	UD	12 (12)	2011-11-26	(Poland) Lodowisko BOSiR, Bialystok	
30	Win	27–3	(France) Adel Belhachemi	UD	6 (6)	2011-10-28	(France) Salle Valentre, Cahors	
29	Loss	26–3	(Poland) Paweł Głażewski	SD	10 (10)	2011-09-16	(Poland) Torwar Sport Hall, Warsaw	
28	Win	26–2	(Spain) Carlos Esteban	UD	6 (6)	2011-07-01	(France) Salle du Mouzon, Auch	
27	Win	25–2	(Belgium) Dries Kumpen	RTD	3 (6)	2011-06-18	(France) Salle l'archipel, Castres	
26	Win	24–2	(Switzerland) Mohamed Belkacem	UD	12 (12)	2011-04-15	(France) Salle Pierre Montesquiou, Condom	Won vacant African light-heavyweight title
25	Win	23–2	(France) Martial Bella Oleme	UD	8 (8)	2010-11-19	(France) Petit Palais des Sports, Toulouse	
24	Win	22–2	(Czech Republic) Jindrich Velecky	PTS	6 (6)	2010-07-03	(France) Salle du Mouzon, Auch	
23	Win	21–2	(France) Mehdi Kharbeche	TKO	4 (8)	2010-05-29	(France) Salle Pierre Montane, Toulouse	
22	Loss	20–2	(Russia) Igor Mikhalkin	MD	8 (8)	2009-12-19	(Germany) Sport- und Kongresshalle, Schwerin	
21	Loss	20–1	(Malawi) Isaac Chilemba	UD	12 (12)	2009-10-31	(South Africa) Emperors Palace, Kempton Park	Lost WBC International Light Heavyweight title
20	Win	20–0	(Zambia) Charles Chisamba	UD	12 (12)	2009-07-10	(France) Salle du Mouzon, Auch	Retained WBC International Light Heavyweight title
19	Win	19–0	(France) Martial Bella Oleme	UD	6 (6)	2009-06-13	(France) Salle l'archipel, Castres	
18	Win	18–0	(France) David Greter	PTS	6 (6)	2009-05-28	(France) Cirque d'hiver, Paris	
17	Win	17–0	(Czech Republic) Michal Bilak	UD	8 (8)	2009-04-24	(France) Salle Pierre Montesquiou, Condom	
16	Win	16–0	(Croatia) Josip Jalusic	TKO	1 (6)	2009-04-04	(France) Salle Renaux, Rosny Sur Seine	
15	Win	15–0	(France) Jose Tavares	RTD	4 (8)	2009-01-24	(France) Palais des sports, Pau	
14	Win	14–0	(Russia) Seifudin Barakhoev	TKO	7 (12)	2008-12-13	(Russia) Yunost Arena, Chelyabinsk	Won vacant WBC International Light Heavyweight title
13	Win	13–0	(France) Achille Omang Boya	PTS	8 (8)	2008-11-22	(France) Salle Pierre Scohy, Aulnay-sous-Bois	
12	Win	12–0	(France) Pascal Lacampagne	PTS	8 (8)	2008-07-05	(France) Salle du Mouzon, Auch	
11	Win	11–0	(France) Simon Bakalak	PTS	6 (6)	2008-06-07	(France) Salle l'archipel, Castres	
10	Win	10–0	(Romania) Cristian Toni	RTD	5 (6)	2008-05-17	(France) Salle Promis, Bordeaux	
9	Win	9–0	(Russia) Andrey Zaitsev	PTS	6 (6)	2008-04-26	(France) Salle Pierre Montane, Toulouse	
8	Win	8–0	(France) Mehdi Cheribet Drouiche	TKO	3 (6)	2008-04-04	(France) Salle Pierre Montesquiou, Condom	
7	Win	7–0	(France) Pascal Lacampagne	UD	6 (6)	2008-03-07	(France) Espace Ornon, Villenave d'Ornon	
6	Win	6–0	(Romania) Cristian Toni	TKO	4 (6)	2008-02-09	(France) Parc des expositions, Albi	
5	Win	5–0	(Russia) Andrey Zaitsev	TKO	4 (6)	2007-12-15	(France) Salle Demontesquiou, Condom	
4	Win	4–0	(France) Aziz Hamdach	TKO	1 (4)	2007-06-23	(France) Salle l'archipel, Castres	
3	Win	3–0	(France) Ali Leylek	PTS	4 (4)	2007-06-02	(France) SAME Durzy, Montargis	
2	Win	2–0	(France) Simon Bakalak	PTS	4 (4)	2007-04-28	(France) Salle Pierre Montane, Toulouse	
1	Win	1–0	(France) Annis Sahli	KO	1 (4)	2007-03-10	(France) Salle des fetes, Echirolles	Professional debut
