= African Boxing Union =

Regional sanctioning body for boxing

- Abbreviation: ABU
- Formation: 1973; 53 years ago
- Type: Sports organisation
- Region served: Africa
- Members: 56 member associations
- Official language: English, French
- President: Houcine Houichi
- Affiliations: World Boxing Council
- Website: abu-boxing.com

The African Boxing Union (ABU; French: Union Africaine de Boxe) is a not-for-profit regional sanctioning body that awards regional boxing titles in the African region. It is a boxing federation within the World Boxing Council (WBC), having been affiliated with them since 1974. The president of the African Boxing Union is Houcine Houichi.

== Current champions ==
=== Men's champions ===
Weight class:	Champion:	Reign began:	Days
Minimumweight	Vacant	–	–
Light flyweight	Vacant	–	–
Flyweight	Vacant	–	–
Super flyweight	Lwandile Ngxeke (RSA)	December 16, 2019	2520
Bantamweight	Vacant	–	–
Super bantamweight	Tony Rashid (TAN)	September 15, 2019	2612
Featherweight	Nathaniel Kakololo (NAM)	December 27, 2019	2509
Super featherweight	Vacant	–	–
Lightweight	Vacant	–	–
Light welterweight	Vacant	–	–
Welterweight	Thulani Mbenge (RSA)	October 17, 2020	2214
Light middleweight	Vacant	–	–
Middleweight	David Tshema (DRC)	December 19, 2020	2151
Super middleweight	Shadir Musa Bwogi	–	–
Light heavyweight	Vacant	–	–
Cruiserweight	Olanrewaju Durodola (NGR)	February 1, 2020	2473
Heavyweight	Jack Muloway (DRC)	December 19, 2020	2151

== See also ==
- List of boxing organisations
- List of African Boxing Union champions
