= Promoter (entertainment) =

Individual or company that promotes live entertainment events

In entertainment, a promoter is an individual or organization that markets and promotes events such as concerts, nightclub performances, raves, sports events, and festivals.

== Description ==
=== Business model ===
Promoters are typically engaged as independent contractors or representative companies by entertainment venues, earning a pre-arranged fee, or a share of revenues (colloquially known as a "cut" and "share of the house"), or both. A share of revenues is often a simple percentage of admission fees (called "the door") and/or food and drink sales, with many variations possible, such as minimums or maximums, allowances for various expenses, or limitations (such as only alcohol sales after midnight). Other promoters operate independently, renting venues for a fixed fee, or under a revenue sharing arrangement with the venue holder, thus keeping larger profits from successful events. One common arrangement for small venues is for the promoter to earn all of the admissions fees, while the venue retains all food and drink revenue.

Some venues have exclusive arrangements with a single promotion company, others work with multiple promoters on a rotating schedule (one night per week, for example), or on an event-by-event basis. Promoters often work together — either as equal partners, or as subcontractors to each other's events. Several promoters may work together for a special event, such as a large New Year's Eve party in a hotel ballroom. They may also engage freelance hosts for their social influence; these amateur promoters market the events to their circle of friends and/or social media followers, in exchange for special treatment and/or free admission to the event and at times, and may form or be included in street teams that promote events at other live venues.

Minimally, an event promoter manages publicity and advertising. Depending on the arrangement, they may also handle security, ticket sales, event admission (door policies), decorations, and booking of other entertainers. Many promoters are DJs or musicians themselves, and may perform at their own events. Some bloggers and individuals with a large following on social media may consider themselves as promoters and charge fees promotional service via their social media platform(s), or through their efforts.

Many musicians and artists act as de facto promoters for their own concerts, either directly or through their manager or booking company. Historically, promotion has been a cottage industry, with companies operated by one or several well-connected charismatic individuals, often working part-time. However, with the rise of corporate ownership of live entertainment assets, several large companies have emerged in the field.

=== Contracts and disputes ===
There are often disputes over money in the promotions industry because it is largely cash business with a history of corruption and uneven recordkeeping. In addition there are many accounting complexities to manage, particularly for large events: revenue, expenses, and oversight of parking, coat checks, concession vendor sales (e.g., CDs and t-shirts), box office so-called "convenience fees", in kind trades, promotional give-away items used to lure guests (e.g., free drinks), costs for insurance, cleaning staff, and so on. One area of frequent contention are quid pro quo cross-promotions, where the promoter or some other party connected with the venue will obtain a favor (for example, a price discount) in exchange for giving a future favor to the vendor. If the existence of the scheme, or the relationship between the parties, is undisclosed this may become a form of bribery. Another opportunity for misunderstanding are the various "lists" of guests who will be admitted for free or with VIP treatment, and the "door policy" used by bouncers to decide who will be admitted and at what price. To deal with these complexities event contracts can become quite long and detailed. Whether written or not, these arrangements tend to favor the party with the greater sophistication or the more control over the production of the event. Even the most detailed, professionally written and negotiated contracts can become the subject of lawsuits over interpretation.

Because nightclubs are often associated with drug and alcohol consumption, rowdiness, and other late-night behavior, promoters may become entangled in various criminal disputes as well.

=== Methods ===
Promoters bring crowds through a variety of methods. The most direct are guerrilla marketing techniques such as plastering posters on outdoor walls, flyposting, and distributing handbills on windows of cars parked in entertainment districts. Promoters also keep mailing lists, usually email lists, of their preferred guests and their wider list of potential customers. Many promoters have taken advantage of online technology such as social networking services and event listing sites to handle publicity, invitations, mailing lists, and so on. Clubs and promoters are among leaders in SMS text message advertising to their own lists as well as sponsored snippets on third-party lists for daily content to subscribers. Many fans promote events and products through their social media on their own free will.

Promoters often build a brand out of their own personalities and the parties they host, marketing the events under a consistent name, style, type of program, and social experience that downplays the branding of the venue or artist. They may develop a loyal clientele that will follow them between locations.

=== Image promotion and VIP hosting ===
In cosmopolitan cities with large affluent populations, there are upscale venues that employ the services of a special kind of promoter called an image promoter. The role of the image promoter is to bring celebrities or fashion models to high end venues and host them at a VIP table. In order to entice models and celebrities to come to the venue, the image promoter is provided with a VIP table and complementary alcohol. High end venues use the presence of models and celebrities to market their venue to an affluent clientele which may often only obtain admittance to the venue through agreeing to spend a certain amount of money on alcohol at the establishment.

== Notable promoters ==
=== Music and other events ===
- Michael Alig, co-founder of Club Kids
- Johnny Edgecombe, London Jazz promoter
- Shelly Finkel, concert promoter (LiveStyle)
- Bill Graham, concert promoter (Bill Graham Presents)
- Al Haymon, A. H. Enterprises (now a subsidiary of Live Nation)
- Chet Helms, concert promoter, (Big Brother and the Holding Company, Family Dog Productions)
- Dick Klotzman, concert promoter
- Paul Tangi Mhova Mkondo International African Music Promoter.
- Kirk Norcross, nightclub promoter (Sugar Hut)
- Philip Sallon, known for the Mud Club, Blitz Club.
- Shyyell Diamond Sanchez-McCray, club promoter
- James St. James, co-founder of Club Kids

=== Sports ===
==== Basketball ====
- Gary Davidson, ABA co-founder
- Ned Irish, president, New York Knicks, 1946 to 1974
- Dennis Murphy, ABA co-founder
- Abe Saperstein, founder, Harlem Globetrotters

==== Boxing and mixed martial arts (MMA) ====
- Muhammad Ali, boxing promoter (Main Bout, Inc. – New York)
- Bob Arum, boxing promoter (Top Rank; Main Bout, Inc.)
- Izzy Asif, boxing promoter GBM Sports
- Jarvis Astaire, boxing promoter (First Artist Corp, Sport Division — London, UK)
- Stefy Bull, boxing promoter Stefy Bull Promotions
- Frankie Carbo, Mafia member and boxing promoter ("The Combination" — New York City)
- Bill Cayton, boxing promoter and film producer (Big Fights, Inc. – New York)
- Jack Curley, 19th century boxing promoter turned wrestling promoter
- Oscar De La Hoya, boxing and MMA promoter (Golden Boy Promotions)
- Dan Duva, boxing promoter (Main Events – New Jersey)
- Dino Duva, boxing promoter (Main Events – New Jersey)
- Lou Duva, boxing promoter (Main Events – New Jersey)
- Kathy Duva, boxing promoter (Main Events – New Jersey)
- Shelly Finkel, boxing promoter (Empire Sports and Entertainment, Inc., Shelly Finkel Management, Inc. – New York)
- Al Haymon, boxing promoter and adviser (Premier Boxing Champions)
- Scott Coker, MMA promoter (Bellator MMA; Strikeforce)
- Barry Hearn, boxing promoter (Matchroom Sport)
- Eddie Hearn, boxing promoter (Matchroom Sport)
- Dave Higgins, boxing promoter (Duco Events)
- Jack "Doc" Kearns, boxing manager and promoter
- Don King, boxing promoter (Don King Productions)
- Kellie Maloney, boxing promoter (Frank Maloney Promotions & Management Limited)
- Tony Lococo, MMA and Kickboxing promoter (ONE Championship)
- Chatri Sityodtong, MMA and Kickboxing promoter (ONE Championship)
- Sammie Marshall, boxing promoter, embezzler (MAPS)
- Floyd Mayweather Jr., boxing promoter (Mayweather Promotions)
- Manny Pacquiao, boxing promoter (MP Promotions)
- Sean Gibbons, boxing promoter, adviser, and match maker (MP Promotions)
- Lope Sarreal, boxing promoter and manager (Interphil Promotions Inc.)
- Harold J. Smith, boxing promoter, embezzler (MAPS)
- Mike Tyson, boxing promoter (Acquinity Sports)
- Frank Warren, boxing promoter (Queensberry Promotions Limited – London, UK)
- Dana White, MMA and boxing promoter (Ultimate Fighting Championship)
- Khabib Nurmagomedov, MMA promoter (Eagle Fighting Championship)
- Shamil Zavurov, MMA promoter (Eagle Fighting Championship)
- Mario Yagobi, boxing promoter (Boxing360 - New York City)
- Felix "Tuto" Zabala, boxing promoter (Miami)
- Chael Sonnen, grappling promoter (Submission Underground (sug))
- Chael Sonnen, wrestling promoter (Chael Sonnen's Wrestling Underground)
- Mark O. Madsen, MMA promoter (Dominance FC)

==== Football ====
- Gary Davidson, World Football League founder

==== Hockey ====
- Gary Davidson, WHA co-founder
- Dennis Murphy, WHA co-founder
- Conn Smythe, namesake of the Conn Smythe Trophy

==== Swimming ====
- Melvin Stewart, swimming promoter

==== Tennis ====
- Leonard Bloom, World Team Tennis co-founder
- Nancy Jeffett, women's tennis promoter
- Billie Jean King, Women's Tennis Association founder, World Team Tennis co-founder
- Larry King, World Team Tennis co-founder
- Dennis Murphy, World Team Tennis co-founder

==== Professional wrestling ====
- Antonio Inoki, New Japan Pro-Wrestling
- Antonio Peña, Lucha Libre AAA Worldwide
- Atsushi Onita, Frontier Martial-Arts Wrestling
- Billy Sandow, Gold Dust Trio
- Billy Wolfe, women's wrestling promoter and manager
- Dixie Carter, Total Nonstop Action Wrestling
- Ed "Strangler" Lewis, Gold Dust Trio
- Eric Bischoff, World Championship Wrestling
- Fred Kohler (wrestling promoter), Fred Kohler Enterprises; Wrestling From Marigold, 1949 to 1955; president, National Wrestling Alliance, 1961 to 1962.
- Jack Curley, sports promoter who helped popularize professional wrestling
- Jack Pfefer, entertainment wrestling pioneer
- Jim Cornette, Smoky Mountain Wrestling
- Leroy McGuirk, National Wrestling Alliance
- Max Crabtree, Joint Promotions
- Mike Quackenbush, CHIKARA
- Mildred Burke, World Wide Women's Wrestling Association founder; wrestler
- Paul Bowser, early wrestling promoter; world middleweight champion
- Paul Heyman, Extreme Championship Wrestling
- Stu Hart, Stampede Wrestling
- Tony Khan, All Elite Wrestling
- Joseph "Toots" Mondt, Gold Dust Trio
- Verne Gagne, American Wrestling Association
- Vince McMahon, Triple H, World Wrestling Entertainment

==== Miscellaneous ====
- Wilt Chamberlain, volleyball and track and field
- Larry King, Roller Hockey International co-founder
- Dennis Murphy, Roller Hockey International co-founder
- Giorgio A. Tsoukalos, former bodybuilding promoter (IFBB, Mr. Olympia)

== See also ==
- Impresario
- List of professional wrestling promoters in the United States
