= Duva =

Duva is an American surname of Italian origin. Notable people with the surname include:

- Dan Duva (1951–1996), American boxing promoter
- Dino Duva (born 1958), American boxing promoter
- Kathy Duva, American boxing promoter
- Lou Duva (born 1922), American businessperson
