= Tony Ayala Jr. =

American boxer (1963–2015)

Antonio Ayala Jr.
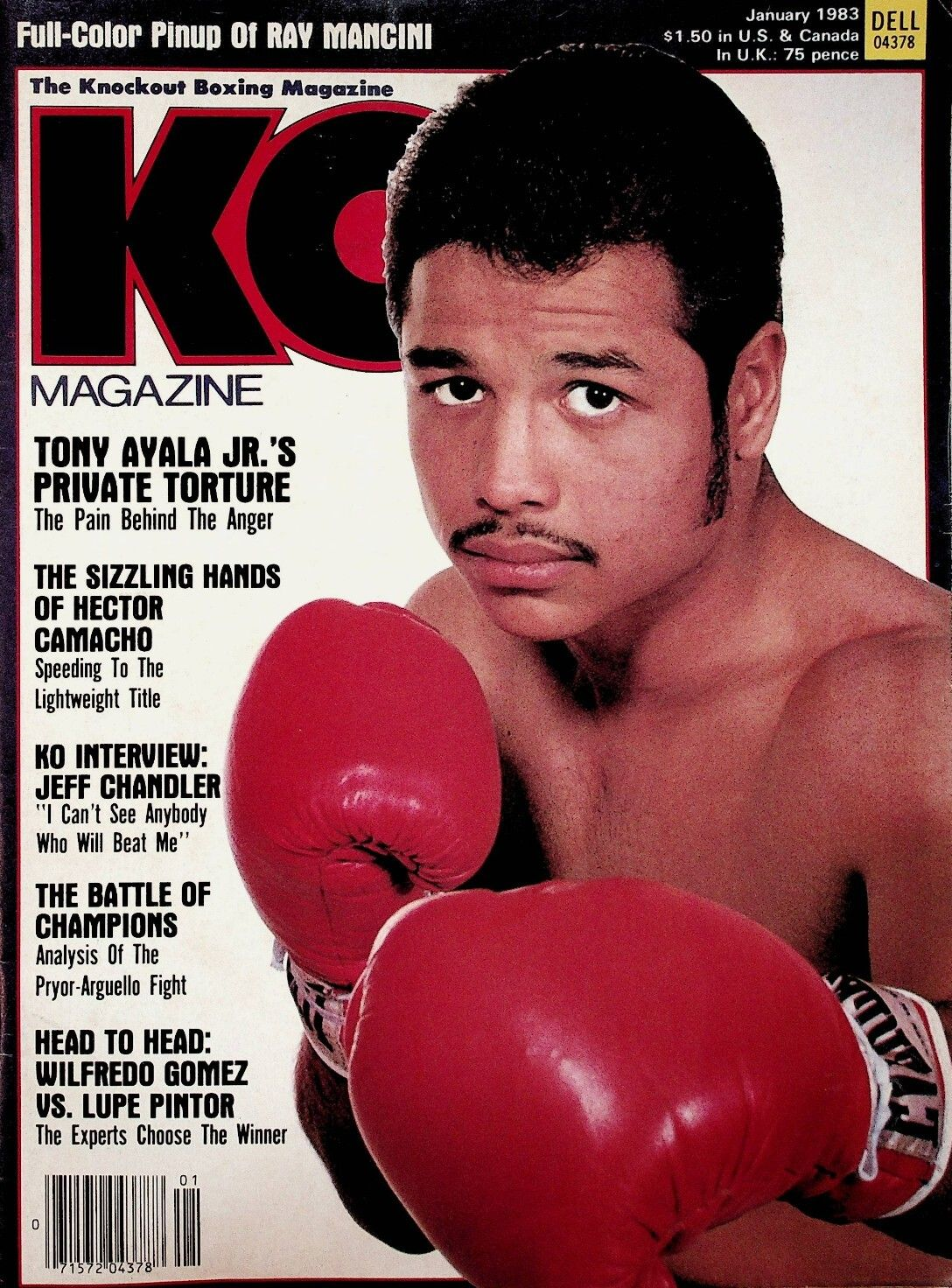
- Ayala Jr. on the cover of KO Magazine January 1983 issue

Personal information
- Nickname: El Torito
- Born: February 13, 1963 San Antonio, Texas, U.S.
- Died: May 12, 2015 (aged 52) San Antonio, Texas, U.S.
- Height: 5 ft 7.5 in (171 cm)
- Weight: Middleweight

Boxing career
- Reach: 68 in (173 cm)
- Stance: Orthodox

Boxing record
- Total fights: 33
- Wins: 31
- Win by KO: 27
- Losses: 2

Antonio Ayala Jr. (February 13, 1963 – May 12, 2015) was an American professional boxer who competed in the light middleweight division. He began his professional career in 1980, and by 1982 he had compiled a record of 22 wins and no losses, with 19 knockouts. Ayala was born to a boxing family, and had three brothers who were boxers, Mike Ayala, Paulie Ayala and Sammy Ayala. Tony Ayala is considered one of the most promising boxing wasted talents by boxing writers and historians, as his career was cut short after he was imprisoned in 1983, at the age of 19. His first shot at the world title never happened due to his personal troubles and later conviction, while his second shot proved unsuccessful, as he was 40 years old and out-of-shape by that time.

== Biography ==
=== Early life ===
Ayala was born in San Antonio, Texas. Tony is the brother of former boxers Mike Ayala and Sammy Ayala and the son of trainer Tony Ayala, Sr.

=== Amateur career ===
Many have said Ayala was a boxing prodigy, he first fought at the age of five, at the age of six he avenged his first defeat. At the age of eight, he was rumored to suffer his last loss. At fourteen, he was battering a world champion around the ring. At 15, he knocked out Sugar Ray Leonard's older brother, Roger Leonard. At that point, his achievements was a bit overshadowed by his older brother Mike, who turned pro in 1975, and by the early 1980 was the number one ranked super bantamweight fighter in the world, so Tony was dubbed simply the "other fighting Ayala."

=== Highlights ===
(gold) National Golden Gloves (165 lbs), Indianapolis, Indiana, March 1979:

- 1/2: Defeated Vaughn Hooks PTS
- Finals: Defeated Lamont Kirkland PTS

(gold) National Sports Festival (165 lbs), Colorado Springs, Colorado, July 1979:

- Finals: Defeated Alex Ramon PTS

Ayala won National Junior Olympic titles in 1977 and 1978 as well as a National Golden Gloves championship in 1979, compiling an amateur record of 140–8 with sixty knockouts. He was one of Olympic hopefuls for the 1980 Summer Olympics, but turned pro instead of qualifying at the National Olympic Trials in Atlanta, Georgia (as Ayala withdrew, Charles Carter qualified for the U.S. Olympic Team in the middleweight class, but the U.S. participation was canceled soon thereafter due to the boycott).

=== Professional career ===
Ayala turned professional in June 1980 with a one-round knockout of Zip Castillo and proceeded to score three other first round knock outs in a row. He was co-managed by the Duva family, namely by Lou Duva, Dan Duva, and Kathy Duva. By December 1981 Ayala, the 18-year-old, was rated No. 3 by the World Boxing Association.

The young boxer was known as a savage brawler who was often considered a "dirty" fighter; for example, on one occasion, he spit on his opponent after knocking him to the ground. He also admitted to using heroin before a fight on three occasions (his brother Mike Ayala also made allegations of using drugs before his world title fight against Danny Lopez). In the summer of 1981, teenager Ayala was featured in a cover story of Sports Illustrated as a rising star in boxing. Veteran boxing writer Michael Katz claimed he was the best young fighter he had ever seen; Muhammad Ali's trainer Angelo Dundee said he thought Ayala could have been one of boxing's greatest fighters. On September 16, 1981, Ayala fought on the undercard of the legendary fight between Sugar Ray Leonard and Thomas Hearns.

=== Personal troubles ===
By summer 1982 Ayala split with and got back with his 18-year-old wife Lisa, they were living in New Jersey, not far from the Duvas. Twice a week, on Mondays and Fridays, he attended meetings of the local Alcoholics Anonymous. On Wednesdays, he drove to New York to attend meetings at the Freedom Institute. On November 19, 1982, Ayala was scheduled to meet Roberto Durán, the former lightweight and welterweight champion, in a 12-round junior middleweight bout co-promoted by Dan Duva and Don King, scheduled to be shown in prime time by NBC. During August–September 1982 he took a monthly course in a clinic, Care Unit Hospital in Orange, California, as part of a plea deal for one of his earlier attacks. Though he was allowed to leave for training purposes. The rehabilitation program kept him from having a $750,000 payday against Roberto Duran. When the Duran fight didn't happen, Ayala settled for about $150,000 to fight Argentinian Carlos Herrera. 'It doesn't bother me,' he said. 'I'm looking at it as a step closer to the world title. Davey Moore is going to have to meet me after this fight.'

=== Rape conviction ===
After defeating Carlos Herrera, November 20, 1982, he was scheduled to fight champion Davey Moore. Ayala was to have one last "tune up" bout on January 26, 1983 when he was scheduled to fight journeyman Leslie "Sweet Lemonade" Gardner at the Ice World Arena in Totowa, New Jersey. By December 1982, Ayala was already a second-ranked junior middleweight in the world.

The fight was not to be. On January 1, 1983, Ayala burglarized the home of his neighbor, a young schoolteacher, and brutally sexually assaulted her. Although he was only 19 years old, Ayala had already been convicted twice of assaults against women. One of these attacks took place in the restroom of a drive-in theatre and left the victim with a broken back. He had been given probation for these offenses. Under a repeat offender's law, he was sentenced to 35 years in prison. The prosecutor at trial argued the young boxer should serve the full term because he was a danger to the community.

Ayala Jr served his sentence term at Rahway State Prison and Trenton State Prison and released in 1999.

=== Release in 1999 ===
Ayala was paroled from prison in 1999 and resumed his boxing career, winning six high-profile fights, all by knockout. Ayala was still popular in his hometown. An eliminator against hard hitting ex-champ Yori Boy Campas brought an end to his unlikely comeback, a hand injury caused Ayala to quit on his stool after 8 rounds. His troubles with the law continued. In 2000, he was shot in the shoulder by a young woman after breaking into her home. At Ayala's trial the prosecution pointed out this was almost an exact replay of Ayala's 1983 offense. He received probation and a brief jail term for this offense. In 2003, Ayala was charged with having sex with a thirteen-year-old girl, but the charges were dismissed when the girl said she lied about it.

=== Reincarceration in 2004 ===
In 2004, Ayala was sentenced to ten years in prison for violation of probation after he was pulled over in his vehicle for speeding, and was also charged with driving without a license, heroin possession and possession of pornography in his vehicle. Tony Jr. was housed at the private Sanders Estes Unit for lower-level offenders in Venus, Southeast of Fort Worth, where he worked as a janitor. He was also housed at the Robertson unit in Abilene Texas a maximum security prison.

=== Release in 2014 and father's funeral ===
Ayala was released on April 25, 2014. He did not grant any interviews or make any appearances or public statements during his second incarceration.

His father, Tony Ayala Sr., who still owned and operated the Zarzamora Street Gym in San Antonio, died on April 10, 2014. Tony was granted special permission to attend his father's funeral on April 16, 2014, greeting family, friends, and fans, his first public appearance in over a decade. He then returned to custody to serve the remaining nine days of his sentence.

=== El Torito at Zarzamora Street Gym ===
Tony Ayala Jr. assisted his brothers, Mike Ayala and Sammy Ayala, in the running of the Zarzamora Street Gym in San Antonio, following his father's death.

=== Death ===
Ayala died on May 12, 2015, age 52, from an apparent overdose at Zarzamora Street Gym, San Antonio, Texas. It has been reported in the media that drug paraphernalia was found near his body.

== Professional boxing record ==
33 fights	31 wins	2 losses
By knockout	27	2
By decision	4	0

No.	Result	Record	Opponent	Opp record	Type	Round, time	Date	Location	Notes
33	Loss	31–2	(United States) Anthony Bonsante	22–3–3	TKO	11 (12), 1:32	25 Apr 2003	(United States) Thunderbird Wild West Casino, Norman, Oklahoma, USA	for vacant IBA Super Middleweight Title
32	Win	31–1	(United States) Lee Fortune	25–20–2	KO	5 (10), 2:10	6 Sep 2002	(United States) Roy Wilkins Auditorium, Saint Paul, Minnesota, USA	
31	Win	30–1	(Mexico) Urbano Gurrola	18–8–0	KO	2 (10), 2:52	3 May 2002	(United States) Randy's Ballroom, San Antonio, Texas, USA	
30	Win	29–1	(United States) Manuel Lopez	22–2–0	TKO	2 (10), 1:10	9 Nov 2001	(United States) Sunset Station, San Antonio, Texas, USA	
29	Win	28–1	(Puerto Rico) Santos Cardona	39–9–0	UD	10 (10)	31 Jul 2001	(United States) Sunset Station, San Antonio, Texas, USA	96–92, 98–90, 95–93
28	Loss	27–1	(Mexico) Luis Ramon Campas	74–4–0	RTD	8 (10)	28 Jul 2000	(United States) Freeman Coliseum, San Antonio, Texas, USA	Ayala not out for 9th
27	Win	27–0	(United States) Gerald Coleman	16–14–0	KO	2 (10), 1:50	19 May 2000	(United States) Will Rogers Coliseum, Fort Worth, Texas, USA	
26	Win	26–0	(Nicaragua) Jorge Luis Vado	16–7–1	KO	4 (10), 0:50	14 Apr 2000	(United States) Freeman Coliseum, San Antonio, Texas, USA	
25	Win	25–0	(United States) Tony Menefee	69–6–1	TKO	8 (10), 1:21	11 Dec 1999	(United States) Freeman Coliseum, San Antonio, Texas, USA	
24	Win	24–0	(United States) Robert Koon	18–6–1	TKO	4 (10), 1:54	24 Sep 1999	(United States) Memorial Coliseum, Corpus Christi, Texas, USA	
23	Win	23–0	(United States) Manuel Esparza	19–5–1	TKO	3 (10), 2:53	20 Aug 1999	(United States) Freeman Coliseum, San Antonio, Texas, USA	
Served a prison term.
22	Win	22–0	(Argentina) Carlos Herrera	47–6–0	KO	3 (10), 2:34	20 Nov 1982	(United States) Convention Hall, Atlantic City, New Jersey, USA	WBA World Super Welterweight Title eliminator
Took a mandatory rehabilitation course in a clinic.
21	Win	21–0	(United States) Robbie Epps	30–2–0	TKO	1 (10), 1:32	1 Aug 1982	(United States) Freeman Coliseum, San Antonio, Texas, USA	
20	Win	20–0	(United States) Curtis Ramsey	21–11–5	UD	10 (10)	26 Jun 1982	(United States) Will Rogers Coliseum, Fort Worth, Texas, USA	
19	Win	19–0	(United States) Steve Gregory	26–2–2	TKO	3 (10), 2:02	2 May 1982	(United States) Curtis Hixon Hall, Tampa, Florida, USA	
18	Win	18–0	(Dominican Republic) Dario De Asa	8–8–0	KO	2 (10)	10 Apr 1982	(United States) Astro Arena, Houston, Texas, USA	
17	Win	17–0	(United States) Nat King	26–18–1	KO	4 (10), 2:59	26 Feb 1982	(United States) Freeman Coliseum, San Antonio, Texas, USA	
16	Win	16–0	(United States) James Waire	17–9–1	TKO	7 (10)	15 Jan 1982	(United States) Will Rogers Coliseum, Fort Worth, Texas, USA	
15	Win	15–0	(United States) J.J. Cottrell	22–10–3	TKO	8 (10)	10 Dec 1981	(United States) Ice World, Totowa, New Jersey, USA	
14	Win	14–0	(Mexico) Jose Baquedano	30–7–1	KO	1 (10), 1:09	16 Sep 1981	(United States) Caesars Palace, Outdoor Arena, Las Vegas, Nevada, USA	
13	Win	13–0	(Colombia) Nicanor Camacho	8–0–1	UD	10 (10)	23 Aug 1981	(United States) Freeman Coliseum, San Antonio, Texas, USA	100–91, 100–93, 100–93
12	Win	12–0	(United States) Jerry Cheatham	31–5–2	TKO	6 (10), 1:44	25 Jun 1981	(United States) Astrodome, Houston, Texas, USA	
11	Win	11–0	(United States) Pat Hallacy	27–6–1	KO	4 (10)	23 May 1981	San Remo, Liguria, Italy	
10	Win	10–0	(United States) Agapito Ramirez	11–12–1	TKO	3 (8)	25 Apr 1981	(United States) Veterans Memorial Coliseum, Phoenix, Arizona, USA	
9	Win	9–0	(United States) Mario Maldonado	11–7–1	KO	3 (8), 2:57	28 Mar 1981	(United States) Carrier Dome, Syracuse, New York, USA	
8	Win	8–0	(Mexico) Jose Luis Baltazar	30–29–2	TKO	2 (10), 2:59	16 Jan 1981	(United States) HemisFair Arena, San Antonio, Texas, USA	
7	Win	7–0	(United States Virgin Islands) Earl Liburd	11–8–1	KO	1 (8)	20 Dec 1980	(United States) Kingsbridge Armory, Bronx, New York, USA	
6	Win	6–0	(United States) Lester Groves	5–4–2	KO	2 (10), 0:59	20 Nov 1980	(United States) Ice World, Totowa, New Jersey, USA	
5	Win	5–0	(United States) Mike Baker	35–14–1	UD	8 (8)	1 Nov 1980	(United States) Caesars Tahoe, Stateline, Nevada, USA	80–72, 80–72, 80–72
4	Win	4–0	(United States) Archie Andrews	11–12–0	KO	1 (10)	18 Sep 1980	(United States) Ice World, Totowa, New Jersey, USA	
3	Win	3–0	(Mexico) Manuel Torres	3–11–1	KO	1 (10)	28 Jul 1980	(United States) Memorial Civic Center, Corpus Christi, Texas, USA	
2	Win	2–0	(Mexico) German Marquez	2–4–0	KO	1 (8), 2:25	15 Jul 1980	(United States) Royal Palace Ballroom, San Antonio, Texas, USA	
1	Win	1–0	(United States) Zip Castillo	23–16–1	KO	1 (8), 2:25	17 Jun 1980	(United States) Royal Palace Ballroom, San Antonio, Texas, USA	
