= Totowa =

Totowa may refer to the following in the U.S. state of New Jersey:

- Totowa, New Jersey, a borough in Passaic County
  - Totowa Borough Public Schools, a school district in the above borough
- Totowa section, a neighborhood of Paterson
