= Greater Community Bancorp =

Greater Community Bancorp was a bank primarily operating in northern New Jersey. The headquarters of the bank were located on Union Boulevard in Totowa, New Jersey, and the bank had locations throughout Passaic, Morris and Bergen counties.

In the mid 1990s the bank, formerly Great Falls Bank, began acquiring other local banks, including the First National Bank of Little Falls and Family First Savings Bank of Clifton and bringing them into the fold. The company operated branches under the name Great Falls Bank (a chain primarily in Passaic County), Bergen Commercial Bank (the bank's Bergen County chain), Rock Community Bank (a standalone branch in Glen Rock), and Greater Community Bank (in Morris County).

Beginning in 2001, Greater Community began renaming its banks to the name of the parent company, starting with Great Falls Bank. Eventually Bergen Commercial Bank and Rock Community Bank became Greater Community Bank.

Greater Community Bancorp ceased to exist in June 2008 after a merger with Valley National Bank, and all their branches were rebranded with the Valley name by the end of the year.
