= Alexander M. Quinn =

- Born: 1866; Passaic, New Jersey
- Died: May 4, 1906 (aged 39–40); Cebu, Philippines
- Burial place: Holy Sepulchre Cemetery, Totowa, New Jersey
- Military career
- Allegiance: United States of America
- Branch: United States Army
- Service years: 1889, 1891 - 1906
- Rank: Sergeant
- Units: Troop G, 13th Infantry Regiment
- Conflicts: Spanish–American War; Philippine–American War
- Awards: Medal of Honor

Alexander M. Quinn (1866 – May 4, 1906) was a soldier in the United States Army who received the Medal of Honor for his actions in the Spanish–American War.

Quinn joined the army from Philadelphia, Pennsylvania, in May 1889, but was discharged after only a few months of service. He rejoined the army in June 1891, and Philippine–American War. He was mortally wounded while serving in the Philippines, and died on May 4, 1906.

== Medal of Honor citation ==
Sergeant Quinn's citation reads:

Gallantly assisted in the rescue of the wounded from in front of the lines and under heavy fire from the enemy.

== See also ==
- List of Medal of Honor recipients for the Spanish–American War
