= Holy Sepulchre Cemetery (Totowa, New Jersey) =

Roman Catholic cemetery in Passaic County, New Jersey

Coordinates: 40°54′32″N 74°11′59″W

- Interactive map of Holy Sepulchre Cemetery

Details
- Location: Totowa, New Jersey
- Type: Roman Catholic cemetery

Holy Sepulchre Cemetery and Mausoleum is an American Roman Catholic cemetery in Totowa, New Jersey, named after the Church of the Holy Sepulchre in Jerusalem, thus associated with the Resurrection of Jesus.

The cemetery was founded as the parish cemetery of the Cathedral of St. John the Baptist in Paterson. It has been in operation since the early 1840s, incorporating some of the original cemeteries in Paterson.

The cemetery holds the plot for the remains for the Franciscan friars of Holy Name Province, which serves the Eastern Seaboard of the United States.

== Notable burials ==
- Dan Duva (1951–1996), boxing promoter
- Lou Duva (1922–2017), boxing trainer and manager
- John Philip Holland (1841–1914), Irish engineer and submarine designer
- Mychal F. Judge, O.F.M. (1933–2001), the first official victim of the September 11 attacks
- Matthew Maguire (1850–1917), labor activist
- Edward Sylvester "The Only" Nolan (1857–1913), Major League Baseball player
- Bill Pascrell (1937-2024), US congressman
- Dave Prater (1935–1988), R&B musician
- Alexander M. Quinn (1866–1906), US Army soldier who received the Medal of Honor for his actions in the Spanish–American War
- Robert A. Roe (1924–2014), US Congressman
- John "Honey" Russell (1902–1973), basketball player and coach
- A Commonwealth war grave, of a Canadian Army soldier of World War I
