= Lady Clover Honey =

American drag queen

Clover Welsh / Lady Clover Honey
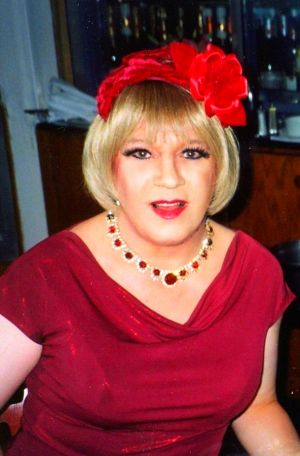
- Lady Clover Honey
- Born: Kevin Clover Welsh; Totowa, New Jersey

Comedy career
- Years active: 1995 – present
- Medium: Television, Film, Stand-Up, Theater
- Subjects: Film, Television, drag, comedy

Lady Clover Honey is an American drag queen, comedian and television correspondent who lives in Jersey City, NJ and works in the New York City area. Born Kevin Clover Welsh in Totowa, New Jersey, he moved across the Hudson River to Manhattan in 1998 and then to Jersey City, New Jersey in 2011. Lady Clover Honey was an Entertainment News Reporter on the television program Under the Pink Carpet, a show that highlights Nightlife and Culture in New York City and was broadcast on NYC Life/NYC Media WNYE-TV, and on WYBE MiND TV in Philadelphia, making her the first recurring Drag personality to be regularly seen in a series on an official NYC media broadcast.

Her film appearances include the Casper Andreas movies A Four Letter Word (2007), Between Love and Goodbye (2008), The Big Gay Musical (2009), and Violet Tendencies (2010) along with Shore Thing (2008) directed by Lovari, Farm Girl in New York (2007) directed by J. Robert Spencer and An Englishman in New York, a Quentin Crisp biopic. She also appeared in a non-sexual celebrity cameo as a fashionista in the adult-entertainment film, Michael Lucas' La Dolce Vita. Lady Clover Honey's theatrical credits include replacing the legendary Lady Bunny as rambunctious minister's wife Charity Divine in the acclaimed political comedy When Joey Married Bobby with performances at the Roy Arias Theater on West 43rd Street in NYC's Broadway Theater District.

Lady Clover Honey's notable live performances including being the first and only Drag Maestro Conductor at Carnegie Hall where she took the baton to guide the orchestra and choir at a concert for the New York City Gay Men's Chorus in December 2005. She also is known for hosting events at the annual Fresh Fruit Festival the largest LGBT arts festival in New York City, and for curating visual fine art and photography shows at the Leslie Lohman Gay Art Foundation in Soho, NYC's Art district.

Lady Clover Honey created a web-streaming cooking series called "Clover Culinary" in 2020 where she shares her favorite recipes in a stylish way from her kitchen in Jersey City. She directed, co-wrote and stars in a short comedy film called "Modest Male Exposure" a mocumentary exploring the issues of Male nudity in public restrooms and locker rooms in 2022. The movie was produced with filmmaker and actor Jed Ryan, who also stars in the film. She also appears in the short film "Attack of the Amazing Colossal Stud" a parody of the horror, sci-fi classic. She introduces and closes the movie as journalist Goldie Hanson, the same character she played in "Modest Male Exposure." Clover also wrote, directed and stars in the short film, "Drag to Death" a horror and camp cult movie, which won the Best Alternative Horror Award at the 2024 Poor Life Choices Comedy Film Festival in Los Angeles, California.
