= Dennis Murphy (sports entrepreneur) =

American sports entrepreneur (1926–2021)

- Murphy, c. 2012
- Born: September 4, 1926; Shanghai, China
- Died: July 15, 2021 (aged 94); Placentia, California, U.S.
- Occupations: Sports entrepreneur. mayor of Buena Park, Calif., New York Life Insurance agent
- Known for: World Team Tennis (Founder); Roller Hockey International (Founder); World Hockey Association (Co-founder); American Basketball Association (Co-founder)

Dennis Arthur Murphy (September 4, 1926 – July 15, 2021) was an American sports entrepreneur who helped co-found the American Basketball Association (1967–1976) (with Gary Davidson), the World Hockey Association (1972–1979), the original World TeamTennis (1973–1978) with Larry King, Roller Hockey International (1992–1999), and several other trend-setting amateur and professional sports concepts and events. Each of his innovations exhibited ground-breaking marketing and promotional tactics, new rules, and a style of play that forced the evolution of the entrenched incumbent. Among the many visionary rules and promotional concepts introduced by Murphy include the 3-point shot (ABA), the Slam-Dunk Contest (ABA), team cheerleaders (ABA), the first $1 million contract (WHA), and he paved the path for the ever-growing wave of European and Russian hockey players that now play in North America.

Murphy's WHA and the ABA competed directly with the entrenched National Hockey League and the National Basketball Association, respectively. Murphy and company enticed one of the game's best players, Bobby Hull, to flee the NHL to the WHA with an unprecedented $1 million contract, and “Mr. Hockey,” Gordie Howe, soon followed. Murphy was the commissioner of the WHA for three years, and the Dennis A. Murphy Trophy was presented annually to the WHA's best defenseman. Both the WHA and ABA eventually merged teams into the more-entrenched leagues.

Dennis Arthur Murphy was a second baseman on the varsity team at University High School in West Los Angeles – notable alumni include Judy Garland, Marilyn Monroe, Elizabeth Taylor, and Nancy and Frank Sinatra Jr., – but his love for sports and building new leagues greatly surpassed his own playing skills.

According to his 2013 autobiography, "Murph: The Sports Entrepreneur Man," Murphy was born in Shanghai, China, on 4 September 1926, to a father who worked for Standard Oil and a housewife mother, Murphy and his family moved back to the United States a year before the Japanese attacked Pearl Harbor in 1941. A staff sergeant in World War II, Murphy joined the reserves after the war and came out of the Korean War as a captain. Murphy attended the University of Southern California on the GI Bill majoring in economics. He was a one-term mayor of Buena Park in Orange County, California (April 15, 1958 to July 17, 1959), before becoming a marketing executive for one of California's biggest civil engineering firms, Voorheis, Trindle, and Nelson.

In 1958, Murphy was elected and began to serve as a one-term mayor of Buena Park, California; but his career path changed when he met Jim Hardy, a close friend of future Oakland Raiders owner Al Davis. Hardy had also attended the University of Southern California with Murphy, and he asked for his fellow alum's help in pursuing a team for Anaheim's new stadium (set to house Gene Autry's California Angels of Major League Baseball) for the new American Football League. Anaheim's proposed team was quashed in 1960 when Al Davis, as one of the conditions of accepting a merger between the National Football League and the AFL, agreed that no additional team would be permitted in the Los Angeles market alongside the L.A. Rams.

Stung by this defeat, Murphy set his sights on pro basketball. In the 1960s, the National Basketball Association consisted of 12 teams, and had successfully fought off a challenge by Abe Saperstein's (Harlem Globetrotters) America Basketball League. Teaming up with attorney Gary Davidson, Murphy worked on creating a league, the American Basketball Association, that eventually merged several teams into the NBA. The ABA became famous for its three-point shot, slam dunk and red, white and blue basketball... not to mention players like "Dr. J." Julius Erving, Rick Barry, George Gervin, Connie Hawkins, and many others. In 1967, ABA Commissioner George Mikan presided over the league's 11 teams in the inaugural season: the Pittsburgh Pipers, Minnesota Muskies, Indiana Pacers, Kentucky Colonels, New Jersey Americans, New Orleans Buccaneers, Dallas Chaparrals, Denver Rockets, Houston Mavericks, Anaheim Amigos and Oakland Oaks.

"Ultimately, four ABA teams were absorbed into the older league: the New York Nets, Denver Nuggets, Indiana Pacers and San Antonio Spurs. Two other clubs, the Kentucky Colonels and the Spirits of St. Louis were disbanded upon the merger. A third, the Virginia Squires, had folded less than a month earlier, missing out on the opportunities that a merger might have provided."

The ABA folded after its 1976 season, but Murphy had been working on two other professional sports leagues, the World Hockey Association and World Team Tennis. The WHA debuted in 1972 and ran through 1979 and was the National Hockey League's first major competitor since the Western Hockey League in 1926. The WHA gave the more established league fits by cannibalizing NHL rosters, signing players under 20-years old directly from Major Junior (Wayne Gretzky), by placing teams in major cities that didn't host NHL teams, and by successfully challenging the reserve clause that bound players to their teams. This victory gave NHL players the opportunity to split to the upstart league, and Bobby Hull took full advantage. Hull signed a record 10-year, $2.75 million contract, and 66 NHL players followed Hull's lead in the NHL's first year.

As in most of Murphy's leagues, franchises appeared and disappeared like figures in Whack-a-Mole. The league finally disappeared in 1979, but not before four teams joined the NHL – the Edmonton Oilers, New England Whalers, Quebec Nordiques, and Winnipeg Jets. On May 20, 1979, the Jets won their third AVCO World Trophy by defeating the Oilers in the final WHA game.

Murphy co-founded World Team Tennis(WTT) in 1973 with Larry King, Fred Barman and Jordan Kaiser, and league play began in 1974 with 16 teams, a four-color tennis court, and teams made up of two men and two women. This made WTT the first professional sports league to give equal weight to each man and woman competing for their teams. Elton John wrote the theme song Philadelphia Freedom for his good friend Billie Jean King. The first league ended play in 1978.

In 1988, Murphy moved on to try to create the International Basketball Association. As in all of his leagues, there were tweaks made to the traditional game. The IBA, which began with 12 teams in May, 1988, was limited to players 6′4″ and under.

Roller Hockey International (1992–1999) was Murphy's most recent professional sports league. In his autobiography, |MURPH, The Sports Entrepreneur Man and His Leagues: ABA, WHA, WTT, RHI, IFL, GHA, and Bobby Sox Softball," self-published in 2002, Murphy wrote that one day in 1991, he saw some kids playing roller hockey, and he told his brother John what he had seen:

"He informed me that inline skating was a hot ticket and people everywhere of all ages and sizes were playing roller hockey in parks and playgrounds. This immediately appealed to me. Imagine hockey being played on concrete rather than ice. Imagine being able to play hockey anywhere in the world, rather than being limited to ice arenas. Wow! What a way to finish up my career."

Murphy, then 66 years old, was inspired to begin working to develop a new sport. He invited entrepreneur Alex Bellehumeur and Larry King to join him in developing roller hockey at a professional level. King, born in Ohio and raised in California, was an attorney by trade as well as a sports entrepreneur. In addition to helping create World Team Tennis and womenSports, which eventually became Women's Sports Magazine, King helped develop the Women's Sports Foundation and the Kauai-Loves-You Triathlon in Hawaii. King was once married to tennis star Billie Jean King. Bellehumeur had his hand in many inventions and was on the board of directors for the Port of Long Beach, California.

Murphy was named RHI's president, Bellehumeur was the chairman of the board, and King became the league's general counsel. Murphy, Bellehumeur and King converted Bellehumeur and Murphy's preexisting corporation, World Sports Management, Inc., into RHI, Inc., and the two men retained controlling interest in the new entity, with King as co-founder and part owner. “We were missing one thing – a high-profile hockey man,” Murphy wrote.

Ralph Backstrom, who had won six Stanley Cup Championships with the NHL's Montreal Canadiens, was hired as the new league's commissioner. Murphy had known Backstrom from his days as a player in the WHA following his NHL career. Then living in Denver, Colorado, Backstrom was the National Hockey League's Rookie of the Year for the Canadiens in 1959. Backstrom oversaw the league's rules and style of play.

== Honors ==
From 1973 and 1979, the Dennis A. Murphy Trophy was presented to the best defenseman of the World Hockey Association.

In 2010, Murphy was part of the initial group of individuals elected to the World Hockey Association Hall of Fame.

The Roller Hockey International Championship trophy, the Murphy Cup, was named after Dennis as the leagues' founder.
