= Under the Pink Carpet =

American television entertainment/news magazine series

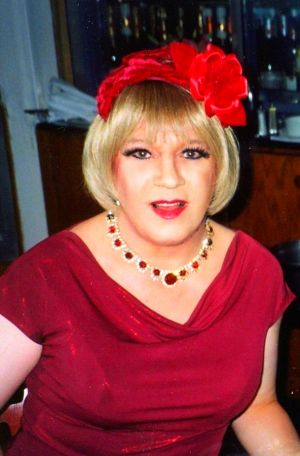
Lady Clover Honey, Entertainment News Correspondent on Under the Pink Carpet

Under the PINK Carpet is a television entertainment/news magazine series that highlights gay, lesbian, bisexual and transgender (LGBT) arts, nightlife and culture in New York City and is broadcast on NYC Life/NYC Media WNYE-TV, and on WYBE MiND TV in Philadelphia, The goal of the series is to entertain and educate about the LGBT (Lesbian, Gay, Bi and Transgender) Community, give exposure to Out artists and to show how Gay citizens contribute to the cultural fabric of New York City and the world. The show first started in Philadelphia before the production moved to New York City.

The show is created, produced and directed by Tony Sawicki, who also serves as the primary correspondent. Also featured are Drag Diva personality Lady Clover Honey, actor and filmmaker Fred Anguera, comedian Marianne Schaberg, performance artist Robin Cloud, attorney and self-described "Fag-Hag" Stephanie Butler and comic Michele Balan who went on to achieve network fame as a top contestant on NBC's "Last Comic Standing".

In 2004, Under the PINK Carpet was distributed by NETA (National Educational Telecommunications Association)a national distributor of PBS television programs to PBS stations in Washington DC, San Francisco and Austin. The series was also broadcast in Canada on the OUTtv cable network.

In May 2010, Tony Sawicki received a Passion Fruit Award for his outstanding dedication and contributions to the NYC, LGBT and Arts Communities for his work on Under the PINK Carpet from the Fresh Fruit Festival, the largest annual LGBT Arts Festival in New York City.
