= Dino Duva =

American boxing promoter

Dino Duva (born August 28, 1958 in Paterson, New Jersey) is an American boxing promoter.

Duva is the son of trainer/manager Lou Duva, and the younger brother of the late Dan Duva. The Duvas have been given the title of "the first family of boxing". Dino Duva has promoted boxing events worldwide, and was inducted into the New Jersey Boxing Hall Of Fame in 1999.

He is the former president of his family's 'Main Events' boxing promotions. After leaving Main Events in 2000, he founded, with his father, 'Duva Boxing' in Totowa, New Jersey, which has become a major promoter; he is its current president. Duva Boxing represents former WBC Heavyweight Champion of the World, Samuel Peter, WBO Cruiserweight Champion Ola Afolabi, cruiserweight contender Darnell Wilson, Italian-American heavyweight Mike Marrone, and James De la Rosa.

In December 2006, Don King purchased a 50% interest in Duva Boxing for an undisclosed financial sum. However, Duva still runs Duva Boxing as a separate entity. The merging of "The Duvas" and "The King" drew media and press attention.
