= Dennis A. Murphy Trophy =

Best World Hockey Association defenseman trophy

The Dennis A. Murphy Trophy was presented annually to the World Hockey Association's best defenceman.

It was named in honour of WHA co-founder Dennis Murphy.

== Winners ==
- 1973 – J. C. Tremblay, Quebec Nordiques
- 1974 – Pat Stapleton, Chicago Cougars
- 1975 – J. C. Tremblay, Quebec Nordiques
- 1976 – Paul Shmyr, Cleveland Crusaders
- 1977 – Ron Plumb, Cincinnati Stingers
- 1978 – Lars-Erik Sjoberg, Winnipeg Jets
- 1979 – Rick Ley, New England Whalers
