= Totowa Borough Public Schools =

School district in Passaic County, New Jersey, US

Address
- 10 Crews Street Totowa, Passaic County, New Jersey, 07512; United States
- Coordinates: 40.903134°N 74.215962°W

District information
- Grades: Pre-K to 8
- Superintendent: Patricia Capitelli
- Business administrator: Vincent W. Varcadipane
- Schools: 2

Students and staff
- Enrollment: 908 (as of 2022–23)
- Faculty: 67.5 FTEs
- Student–teacher ratio: 13.5:1

Other information
- District Factor Group: CD
- Website: www.totowa.k12.nj.us
| Ind. | Per pupil | District spending | Rank (*) | K-8 average | %± vs. average |
|---|---|---|---|---|---|
| 1A | Total Spending | $15,976 | 19 | $18,891 | −15.4% |
| 1 | Budgetary Cost | 14,562 | 50 | 14,159 | 2.8% |
| 2 | Classroom Instruction | 8,504 | 41 | 8,659 | −1.8% |
| 6 | Support Services | 2,438 | 60 | 2,167 | 12.5% |
| 8 | Administrative Cost | 1,891 | 75 | 1,547 | 22.2% |
| 10 | Operations & Maintenance | 1,706 | 59 | 1,612 | 5.8% |
| 13 | Extracurricular Activities | 8 | 2 | 104 | −92.3% |
| 16 | Median Teacher Salary | 62,743 | 55 | 61,136 |
Data from NJDoE 2014 Taxpayers' Guide to Education Spending. *Of K-8 districts with more than 750 students. Lowest spending=1; Highest=84

The Totowa Borough Public Schools are a comprehensive community public school district, serving students in pre-kindergarten through eighth grade in Totowa, in Passaic County, in the U.S. state of New Jersey.

As of the 2022–23 school year, the district, comprising two schools, had an enrollment of 908 students and 67.5 classroom teachers (on an FTE basis), for a student–teacher ratio of 13.5:1.

The district is classified by the New Jersey Department of Education as being in District Factor Group "CD", the sixth-highest of eight groupings. District Factor Groups organize districts statewide to allow comparison by common socioeconomic characteristics of the local districts. From lowest socioeconomic status to highest, the categories are A, B, CD, DE, FG, GH, I and J.

For ninth through twelfth grades, public school students attend Passaic Valley Regional High School, which also serves students from Little Falls and Woodland Park. The school facility is located in Little Falls Township. As of the 2022–23 school year, the high school had an enrollment of 1,039 students and 83.2 classroom teachers (on an FTE basis), for a student–teacher ratio of 12.5:1.

== Schools ==
Schools in the district (with 2022–23 enrollment data from the National Center for Education Statistics) are:

- Memorial School with 416 students in grades PreK-3
  - Joseph Compel, principal
- Washington Park School with 487 students in grades 4–8
  - David Bower, principal

== Administration ==
Core members of the district's administration are:

- Patricia Capitelli, superintendent
- Vincent W. Varcadipane, business administrator and board secretary

== Board of education ==
The district's board of education, comprised of nine members, sets policy and oversees the fiscal and educational operation of the district through its administration. As a Type II school district, the board's trustees are elected directly by voters to serve three-year terms of office on a staggered basis, with three seats up for election each year held as part of the April school election. The board appoints a superintendent to oversee the district's day-to-day operations and a business administrator to supervise the business functions of the district. Of the 600 school districts statewide, Totowa is one of 12 districts with school elections in April, in which voters also decide on passage of the annual school budget.
