= Dick Klotzman =

American concert promoter

Richard Klotzman is a concert promoter.

== Career ==
It was in the late 1950s, at the age of 13½ that Klotzman started his career, beginning as a DJ for radio, record hops and Bar Mitzvahs.

Later Klotzman promoted and produced concerts for various artists. His client list includes T.I., Elvis Presley, Paul Anka, The Beatles, The Rolling Stones, Frank Sinatra, The Eagles, Neil Diamond, Tom Jones, Liza Minnelli, The Jacksons, Madonna, Luther Vandross, Teddy Pendergrass, Alice Cooper, Earth, Wind & Fire, Diana Ross, Seals and Crofts, Stevie Wonder, Cream, Prince, The Who, Led Zeppelin, Dr. Dre, Snoop Dogg, Queen Latifah, Public Enemy.

Klotzman was an innovator and utilized arenas formerly exclusively used for sports events, as concert halls for musical performers. He developed a network of exclusive venue representation. Klotzman produced over 25,000 live entertainment events over 50 years. Now Klotzman heads the multimedia production and promotion consulting firm, Dick Klotzman Presents. He works as a consultant in the entertainment industry.

It was discovered that Klotzman had bipolar disorder and been unmedicated for 45 years. He has since been medicated. In 1996 Klotzman was wrongfully arrested in connection with theft by deception charges. However, all charges were dismissed.
