= Valley Bank =

Regional bank holding company

Valley National Bancorp
- Type: Public company
- Traded as: Nasdaq: VLY; S&P 400 component
- Industry: Financial services
- Founded: 1927; 99 years ago in Passaic, New Jersey, U.S.
- Headquarters: Morristown, New Jersey, U.S.
- Area served: New Jersey; New York; Pennsylvania; Florida; Alabama; Illinois; California
- Key people: Ira Robbins (Chairman and CEO); Gino Martocci, (President); Patrick Smith, (President); Travis Lan, (Senior Executive Vice President and CFO)
- Net income: ▲US$568.9 million (December 31, 2022)
- Total assets: ▲US$57.5 billion (December 31, 2022)
- Total equity: ▲US$6.4 billion (December 31, 2022
- Number of employees: 3,826 (2022)
- Website: valley.com

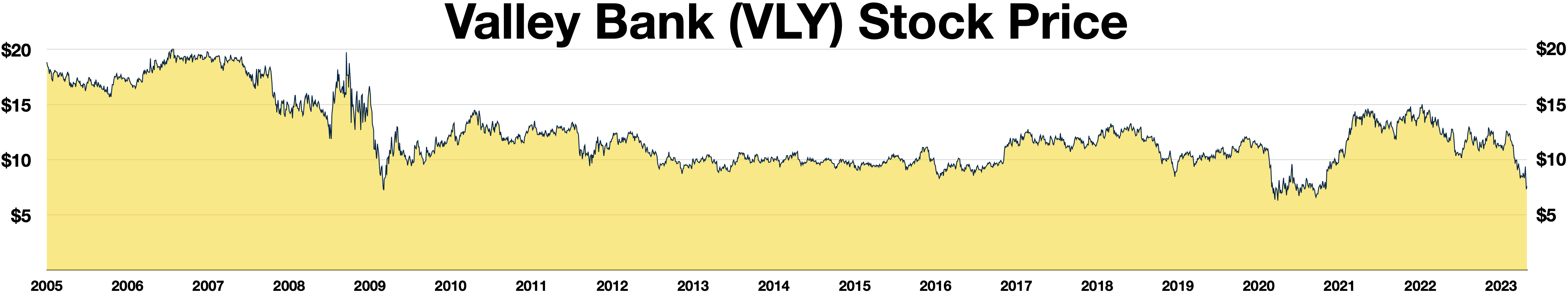
Valley Bank (VLY) Stock Price

Valley National Bancorp, doing business as Valley Bank, is a regional bank holding company headquartered in Morristown, New Jersey, with approximately $64 billion in assets. Its principal subsidiary, Valley National Bank (also doing business as Valley Bank, or just Valley), currently operates over 230 branch locations and commercial banking offices across New Jersey, New York, Florida, Alabama, California, and Illinois. Valley Bank is one of the largest commercial banks headquartered in New Jersey.

== History ==
Founded in 1927 as the Passaic Park Trust Company, the bank changed its name in the mid 1930s to the Bank of Passaic and Trust Company. In 1956 the Bank of Passaic and Trust Company acquired the Bank of Allwood located in Clifton, New Jersey, and changed its name to The Bank of Passaic and Clifton. The acquisition of the Bank of Wayne in 1976 created a need for a new identity to show the expanded geographic reach of the bank, and the name Valley National Bank was chosen, in reference to the lower Passaic River valley shared by Wayne, Clifton, and Passaic.

In 1983, Valley National Bancorp was formed as the holding company of Valley National Bank.

In 1989, Samuel F. Riskin retired as the chairman and chief executive officer of the company. Riskin had served as the longest-tenured president of Valley National Bank, having been appointed in 1953. Under his leadership, the bank's assets grew from $40 million to $3 billion. Riskin, who died in 1992, was replaced by Gerald H. Lipkin, who served as chairman of the board of Valley National Bancorp, and who served as president and CEO of Valley National Bank until 2018.

On January 1, 2018, Ira Robbins was appointed CEO and president, the third president of the bank since 1953.

== Acquisitions ==
Valley National Bancorp has grown through a series of strategic acquisitions in northern and central New Jersey, including the following:

- 1956: The Bank of Allwood of Clifton, New Jersey
- 1976: The Bank of Wayne, after which, the bank was renamed Valley National Bank.
- 1977: Bankers National Bank of Elmwood Park, New Jersey
- 1981: Liberty National Bank of Hillsdale, New Jersey
- 1982: Fair Lawn State Bank of Fair Lawn, New Jersey
- 1984: First National Bank and Trust Co. of Kearny, New Jersey.
- 1990: Mayflower Savings Bank of Livingston, New Jersey, for $19.7 million.
- 1991: The bank acquired from the Resolution Trust Corporation the deposits for the following failed banks:
  - North Jersey Savings of Clifton, New Jersey
  - First Jersey Savings of Wyckoff, New Jersey
  - Nutley Savings of Nutley, New Jersey
  - Yorkwood Savings of Warren, New Jersey.
- 1992: Powder Mill Bank of Morris Plains, New Jersey
- 1993: People's Bank of Fairfield, New Jersey, for $10.6 million
- 1995: Lakeland First Financial Group, Inc. for $119.8 million (not to be confused with Lakeland Bank of Oak Ridge, New Jersey), and American Union Bank of Union Township, New Jersey, for $7 million.
- 1997: Midland Bancorp of Paramus, New Jersey, for $108.4 million.
- 1998: Wayne Bancorp of Wayne, New Jersey, for $62.5 million; Ramapo Bank, also of Wayne, for $99.6 million.
- 2004: Shrewsbury Bancorp of Shrewsbury, New Jersey, for $135.96 million.
- 2005: NorCrown Bank of Livingston, New Jersey, for $141 million.
- 2008: Greater Community Bancorp of Totowa, New Jersey, for $135.96 million.
- 2010: LibertyPointe Bank and The Park Avenue Bank (both FDIC acquired).
- 2019: Oritani Bank of Township of Washington, New Jersey, for $850.97 million

Valley National Bancorp moved beyond its New Jersey roots with the following acquisitions:

- 2000: Merchants Bank for $418.2 million in stock.
- 2012: State Bancorp, Inc. of Long Island (Jericho, New York) for $210.11 million.
- 2014: 1st United Bancorp of Boca Raton, Florida, for $313.79 million.
- 2015: CNLBancshares of Orlando, Florida, for $224.31 million.
- 2018: USAmeriBancorp of Clearwater, Florida, for $769.05 million.
- 2022: The Westchester Bank of White Plains, New York
- 2022: Bank Leumi USA, for $1.2 billion.

The company has also expanded beyond traditional bank operation through the following acquisitions:

- 1994: Rock Financial Corporation for $43.5 million in stock.
- 1999: Commonwealth All Service Title Agency, Ramapo Financial Corporation for $107.3 million, and New Century Asset Management Co. Following the acquisition of Ramapo Financial, the bank moved its headquarters to Wayne, New Jersey.
- 2000: Hallmark Capital Management, Inc
- 2001: Valley Commercial Capital, LLC.
- 2002: Masters Coverage Corp. and NIA/Lawyers Title Agency, LLC.
- 2021: Dudley Ventures
