= Gary Davidson =

American lawyer (born 1934)

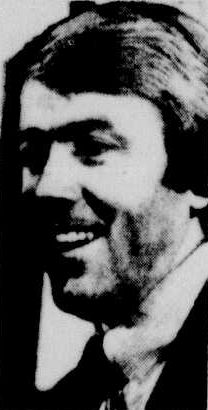
- Born: August 13, 1934 (age 92)
- Citizenship: American
- Occupation: Businessman
- Known for: World Football League (Founder); World Hockey Association (Co-founder); American Basketball Association (League president)
- Spouse: Kate Davidson
- Children: Two sons, two daughters, two stepsons

Gary L. Davidson (born August 13, 1934) is an American lawyer and businessman who is based in Orange County, California.

Davidson co-founded and served as the first president of the World Hockey Association and served as a president of the American Basketball Association. He also founded the World Football League where he was the league's first president and commissioner. He was a star basketball player at Garden Grove High School and attended the University of Redlands, Calif.

== Honors ==
In 1973 and 1974, the Gary L. Davidson Award was presented to the most valuable player of the World Hockey Association.

In 2010, Davidson was part of the initial group of individuals elected to the World Hockey Association Hall of Fame.
