= Dan Duva =

American boxer

- Born: November 7, 1951; Paterson, New Jersey, U.S.
- Died: January 30, 1996 (aged 44)
- Occupation: Boxing promoter

Dan Duva (7 November 1951 – 30 January 1996) was an American boxing promoter who promoted or co-promoted over 100 world championship fights through his family-run business, Main Events. Under his leadership Main Events promoted such notable champions as Evander Holyfield, Lennox Lewis, Pernell Whitaker, Meldrick Taylor, Arturo Gatti, Vinny Pazienza, Mark Breland and many others, who were introduced to the boxing world in a monthly series of bouts televised from Ice World in Totowa, New Jersey.

== Life ==
Born Daniel Salvator Duva in Paterson, New Jersey, he was a son of prominent boxing trainer Lou Duva. He gained a law degree in 1977. When Leon Spinks' manager came for help in 1978, Duva gladly helped him. With earnings of $500,000 ($2.4 million today), Duva formed Main Events in April 1978, together with his father and his brother Dino Duva. He married Kathy Duva, the current Main Events CEO. He was one of the earliest promoters to achieve financial success in the pay-per-view market. He first gained prominence in the boxing world through the 1981 promotion of the Sugar Ray Leonard vs. Thomas Hearns welterweight championship fight, which grossed $40 million ($140 million today) in pay-per-view and closed circuit revenue.

After the 1984 Olympics, Duva successfully signed many of the competitors there, which helped to establish Main Events as a premier promoter.

Duva's career ended early, when he died due to a brain tumor at the age of 44. His remains were buried at Holy Sepulchre Roman Catholic Cemetery. He was posthumously inducted into the International Boxing Hall of Fame in 2003.

== See also ==
- List of notable brain tumor patients
