= Kathy Duva =

American boxing promoter

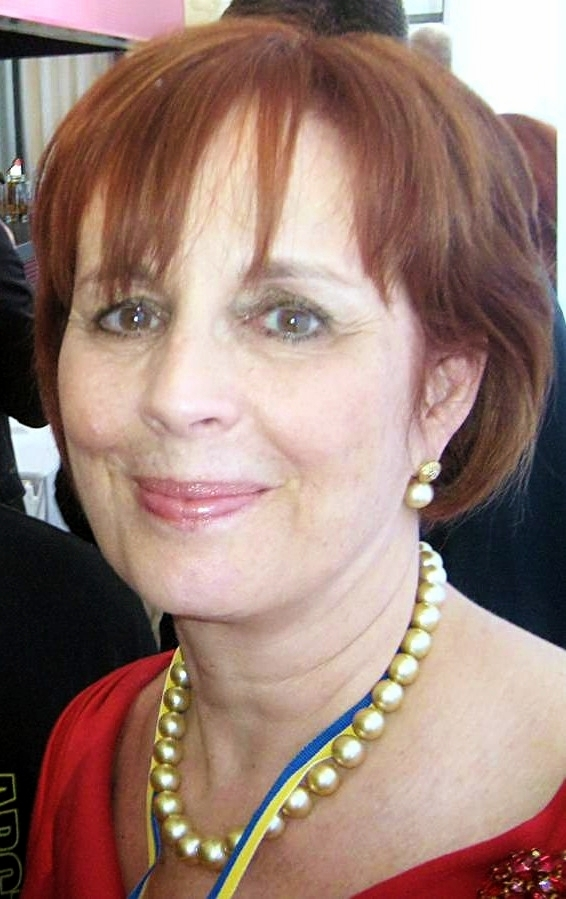
- Born: Kathy Martone; June 29, 1953 (age 73)
- Education: Montclair State College
- Occupation: Boxing promoter
- Organization: Main Events
- Spouse: Dan Duva (–1996)
- Children: Nicole

Kathy Duva is an American boxing promoter and current CEO of Main Events, a New Jersey-based boxing promotion company. In 2019 she was elected to the International Boxing Hall of Fame.

== Early life ==
Duva graduated from Montclair State College with a BA in English. Prior to joining Main Events Duva worked as a reporter covering women's sports at the New York Daily News.

== Main Events ==
Kathy along with her husband Dan founded Main Events in 1979. Early on in the company's history Kathy helped Dan sell tickets to fights at the Ice Palace in Totowa, New Jersey.

=== Sergey Kovalev ===
Perhaps Duva's best known recent client was former Light-Heavyweight champion Sergey Kovalev. Duva signed Kovalev in 2012 following his 2nd round KO of Darnell Boone.

=== Evan Holyfield ===
Duva and Main Events also represent Evan Holyfield, the son of retired world-champion boxer Evander Holyfield.

== Personal ==
Kathy is the widow of International Boxing Hall of Fame inductee Dan Duva.
