= Totowa, New Jersey =

Borough in Passaic County, New Jersey, US

- Borough
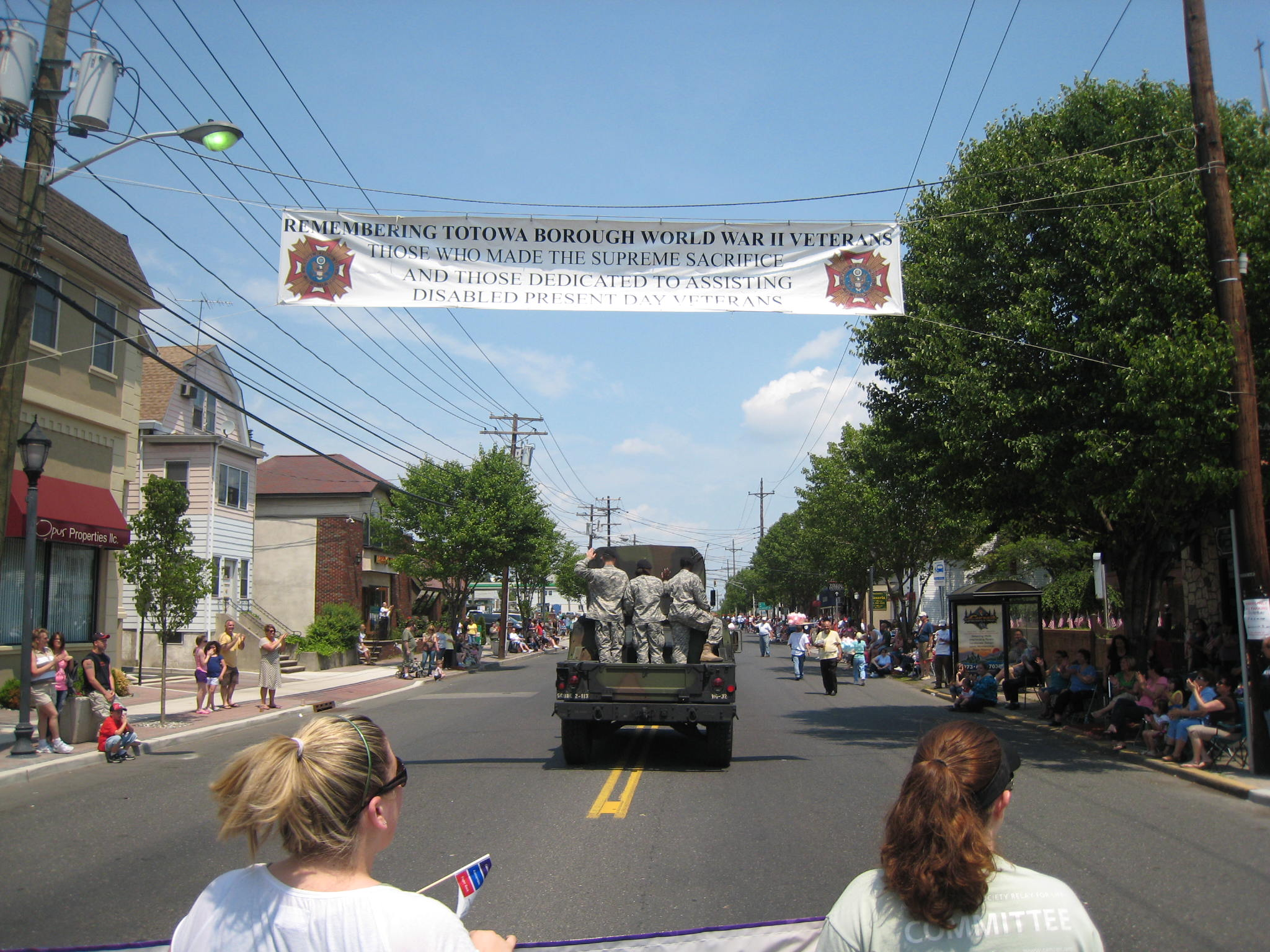
- Memorial Day parade in Totowa

- Seal

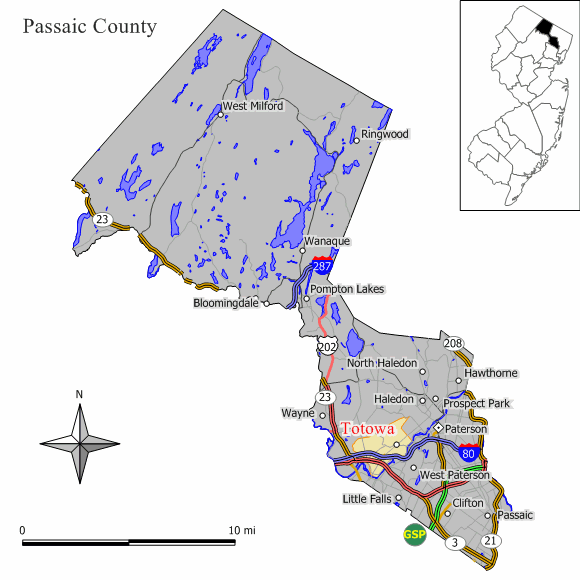
- Map of Totowa in Passaic County. Inset: Location of Passaic County highlighted in the State of New Jersey.

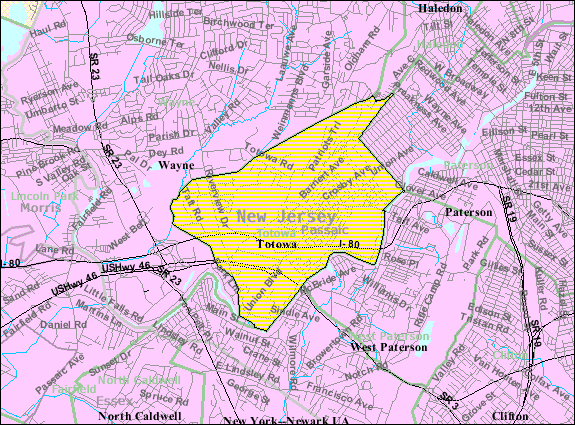
- Census Bureau map of Totowa, New Jersey

- Location in Passaic County Location in New Jersey Location in the United States
- Coordinates: 40.903415°N 74.219779°W
- Country: United States
- State: New Jersey
- County: Passaic
- Incorporated: March 15, 1898

Government
  - Type: Borough
  - Body: Borough Council
  - Mayor: John Coiro (R, term ends December 31, 2026)
  - Municipal clerk: Joseph Wassel

Area
  - Total: 4.08 sq mi (10.56 km^{2})
  - Land: 4.00 sq mi (10.36 km^{2})
  - Water: 0.077 sq mi (0.20 km^{2}) 1.86%
  - Rank: 294th of 565 in state 8th of 16 in county
- Elevation: 262 ft (80 m)

Population (2020)
  - Total: 11,065
  - Estimate (2023): 10,785
  - Rank: 226th of 565 in state 12th of 16 in county
  - Density: 2,766.3/sq mi (1,068.1/km^{2})
  - Rank: 233rd of 565 in state 10th of 16 in county
- Time zone: UTC−05:00 (Eastern (EST))
  - Summer (DST): UTC−04:00 (Eastern (EDT))
- ZIP Codes: 07502, 07511, 07512
- Area code: 973
- FIPS code: 3403173140
- GNIS feature ID: 0885420
- Website: www.totowanj.org

Totowa (/ˈtoʊtəwə/) is a borough in Passaic County, in the U.S. state of New Jersey. As of the 2020 United States census, the borough's population was 11,065, an increase of 261 (+2.4%) from the 2010 census count of 10,804, which in turn reflected an increase of 912 (+9.2%) from the 9,892 counted in the 2000 census.

Totowa was formed as a borough by an act of the New Jersey Legislature on March 15, 1898, from portions of Wayne Township and the now-defunct Manchester Township.

== Etymology ==
The name of Totowa comes from the Native American name for the Passaic Falls of the Passaic River in nearby Paterson, and literally means "sinking or falling water", or "between mountains and water".

== History ==
In 1696, George Willocks, a Scottish land speculator, purchased a tract of land known as Willock's Patent, which included most of modern-day Totowa, Woodland Park (formerly West Paterson) and Little Falls. Located in the western part of Manchester Township, Willock's Patent was resold to Anthony Brockholls and the Van Houten family. The land was retitled the "Totowa Patent", and divided into three parcels, and more land was acquired through the "Garret Mountain Purchase".

In 1895, residents of the southern section of Manchester Township began to become disenchanted with governing officials, and following the election of 1896, many independent municipalities were formed. The formation of the Borough of Totowa was discussed at the Willard Park Hotel on Totowa Avenue, and headed by brothers Joseph and Robert Boyle. On March 15, 1898, the Borough of Totowa was officially incorporated under Chapter 56 of the Laws of New Jersey, signed by Governor John Griggs. On April 12, 1898, the first election of the Borough of Totowa was held at the Willard Park Hotel, which would become the unofficial town hall until the municipal building was completed in 1910.

== Geography ==
According to the United States Census Bureau, the borough had a total area of 4.08 square miles (10.6 km^{2}), including 4.00 square miles (10.4 km^{2}) of land and 0.08 square miles (0.21 km^{2}) of water (1.86%).

The borough borders the Passaic County communities of Haledon, Little Falls, Paterson, Wayne and Woodland Park.

As of 2026, the borough is a member of Local Leaders for Responsible Planning in order to address the borough's Mount Laurel doctrine-based housing obligations.

== Demographics ==
Historical population
Census	Pop.	Note	%±
1900	562		—
1910	1,130		101.1%
1920	1,864		65.0%
1930	4,600		146.8%
1940	5,130		11.5%
1950	6,045		17.8%
1960	10,897		80.3%
1970	11,580		6.3%
1980	11,448		−1.1%
1990	10,177		−11.1%
2000	9,892		−2.8%
2010	10,804		9.2%
2020	11,065		2.4%
2023 (est.)	10,785	▼	−2.5%
Population sources: 1900–1920; 1900–1910 1900–1930; 1940–2000 2000; 2010 2020

=== 2020 census ===
As of the 2020 census, Totowa had a population of 11,065. The median age was 44.3 years. 18.5% of residents were under the age of 18 and 19.8% of residents were 65 years of age or older. For every 100 females there were 92.0 males, and for every 100 females age 18 and over there were 89.3 males age 18 and over.

100.0% of residents lived in urban areas, while 0.0% lived in rural areas.

There were 3,899 households in Totowa, of which 32.6% had children under the age of 18 living in them. Of all households, 55.8% were married-couple households, 14.3% were households with a male householder and no spouse or partner present, and 25.3% were households with a female householder and no spouse or partner present. About 20.0% of all households were made up of individuals and 10.8% had someone living alone who was 65 years of age or older.

There were 4,026 housing units, of which 3.2% were vacant. The homeowner vacancy rate was 0.6% and the rental vacancy rate was 1.8%.

Racial composition as of the 2020 census
Race	Number	Percent
White	7,775	70.3%
Black or African American	280	2.5%
American Indian and Alaska Native	23	0.2%
Asian	852	7.7%
Native Hawaiian and Other Pacific Islander	1	0.0%
Some other race	1,038	9.4%
Two or more races	1,096	9.9%
Hispanic or Latino (of any race)	2,408	21.8%

=== 2010 census ===
The 2010 United States census counted 10,804 people, 3,783 households, and 2,826 families in the borough. The population density was 2,704.9 per square mile (1,044.4/km^{2}). There were 3,918 housing units at an average density of 980.9 per square mile (378.7/km^{2}). The racial makeup was 85.44% (9,231) White, 2.30% (248) Black or African American, 0.10% (11) Native American, 5.92% (640) Asian, 0.00% (0) Pacific Islander, 4.22% (456) from other races, and 2.02% (218) from two or more races. Hispanic or Latino of any race were 14.35% (1,550) of the population.

Of the 3,783 households, 28.9% had children under the age of 18; 58.8% were married couples living together; 11.2% had a female householder with no husband present and 25.3% were non-families. Of all households, 21.8% were made up of individuals and 11.5% had someone living alone who was 65 years of age or older. The average household size was 2.73 and the average family size was 3.19.

20.1% of the population were under the age of 18, 7.3% from 18 to 24, 25.2% from 25 to 44, 29.4% from 45 to 64, and 18.0% who were 65 years of age or older. The median age was 43.3 years. For every 100 females, the population had 94.7 males. For every 100 females ages 18 and older there were 90.8 males.

The Census Bureau's 2006–2010 American Community Survey showed that (in 2010 inflation-adjusted dollars) median household income was $72,568 (with a margin of error of +/− $11,834) and the median family income was $82,750 (+/− $13,865). Males had a median income of $58,750 (+/− $10,202) versus $42,641 (+/− $10,936) for females. The per capita income for the borough was $35,978 (+/− $4,380). About 4.3% of families and 9.8% of the population were below the poverty line, including 8.8% of those under age 18 and 7.7% of those age 65 or over.

Same-sex couples headed 25 households in 2010, almost double the 13 counted in 2000.

=== 2000 census ===
As of the 2000 United States census there were 9,892 people, 3,539 households, and 2,643 families residing in the borough. The population density was 2,474.8 people per square mile (955.5 people/km^{2}). There were 3,630 housing units at an average density of 908.2 per square mile (350.7/km^{2}). The racial makeup of the borough was 93.40% White, 1.12% African American, 0.02% Native American, 2.26% Asian, 1.97% from other races, and 1.22% from two or more races. Hispanic or Latino of any race were 6.37% of the population.

As of the 2000 Census, 37.2% of town residents were of Italian ancestry, the seventh-highest percentage of any municipality in the United States, and second-highest in New Jersey (behind Hammonton, at 45.9%), among all places with more than 1,000 residents identifying their ancestry.

There were 3,539 households, out of which 26.4% had children under the age of 18 living with them, 60.3% were married couples living together, 10.5% had a female householder with no husband present, and 25.3% were non-families. Of all households 21.8% were made up of individuals, and 12.5% had someone living alone who was 65 years of age or older. The average household size was 2.63 and the average family size was 3.09.

In the borough the population was spread out, with 18.3% under the age of 18, 7.0% from 18 to 24, 28.3% from 25 to 44, 25.1% from 45 to 64, and 21.4% who were 65 years of age or older. The median age was 43 years. For every 100 females, there were 89.5 males. For every 100 females age 18 and over, there were 85.6 males.

The median income for a household in the borough was $60,408, and the median income for a family was $69,354. Males had a median income of $44,462 versus $33,869 for females. The per capita income for the borough was $26,561. About 0.8% of families and 4.1% of the population were below the poverty line, including none of those under age 18 and 5.3% of those age 65 or over.

== Economy ==
Big M, a privately held clothing retailer which operates the brands Mandee, Annie Sez and Afaze, is based in Totowa. Big M filed for bankruptcy protection in 2013, precipitated by damage from Hurricane Sandy.

The headquarters of Greater Community Bancorp was located in the borough. The bank operated 16 branches in North Jersey until its 2008 acquisition by Valley National Bank.

== Sports ==
The Totowa Police Athletic League (PAL) is a volunteer organization that offers several sports to the children of Totowa from pre-kindergarten to eighth grade. Established in 1952, the PAL strives to provide children throughout the borough with the fellowship of sports. These include baseball, softball, basketball, soccer, football, hockey, and cheerleading. Although the Totowa PAL is independent from the Borough of Totowa, it uses fields and facilities owned by the municipality. Meetings, registrations, and events are held at the PAL building, built in 1963 and located on Chamberlain Avenue.

In 1961–1962, the New York Gladiators of the short-lived National Bowling League rolled its home matches at "Gladiator Arena", a converted movie theater in Totowa.

== Government ==
=== Local government ===
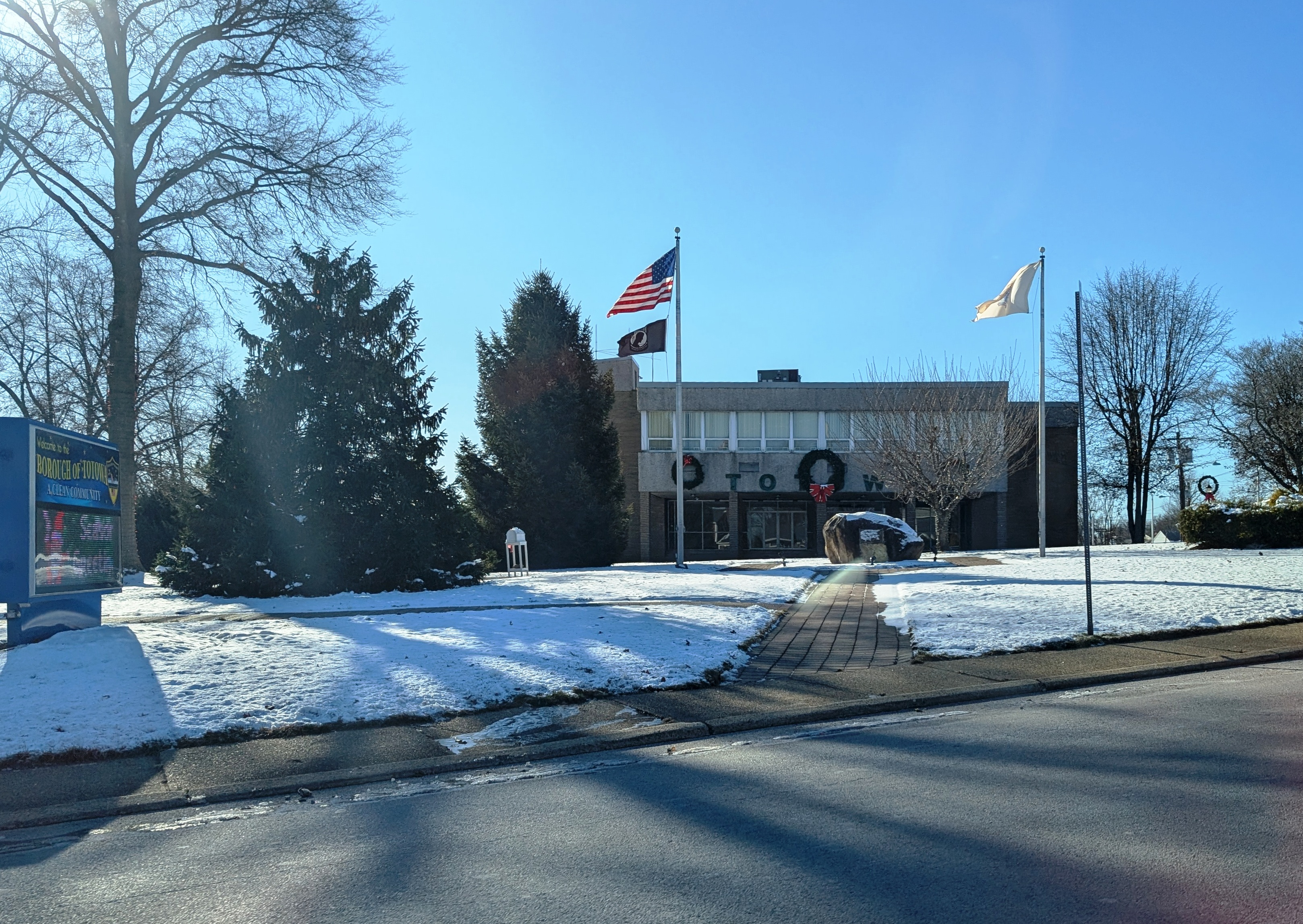
Totowa Municipal Building

Totowa is governed under the borough form of New Jersey municipal government, which is used in 218 municipalities (of the 564) statewide, making it the most common form of government in New Jersey. The governing body is comprised of a mayor and a borough council, with all positions elected at-large on a partisan basis as part of the November general election. A mayor is elected directly by the voters to a four-year term of office. The borough council includes six members elected to serve three-year terms on a staggered basis, with two seats coming up for election each year in a three-year cycle. The borough form of government is a "weak mayor / strong council" government in which council members act as the legislative body with the mayor presiding at meetings and voting only in the event of a tie. The mayor can veto ordinances, subject to an override by a two-thirds majority vote of the council. The mayor makes committee and liaison assignments for council members, and most appointments are made by the mayor with the council's advice and consent.

As of 2024, the mayor of Totowa is Republican John Coiro, whose term of office ends December 31, 2026. Members of the Totowa Borough Council are Council President Lou D'Angelo (R, 2025), William Bucher Jr. (R, 2026), John F. Capo (R, 2025), Patrick Fierro (R, 2024) and Anthony L. Picarelli (R, 2024) and Sanders Reynoso (R, 2026).

Councilmember John Waryas resigned from office in June 2014, citing personal issues. That month, the borough council selected Brendan Murphy from three candidates nominated by the Republican municipal committee to fill Waryas' vacant seat on an interim basis. In the November 2014 general election, Phil Puglise was elected to serve the balance of the term of office.

=== Federal, state and county representation ===
Totowa is located in the 11th Congressional District and is part of New Jersey's 40th state legislative district.

For the 119th United States Congress, New Jersey's 11th congressional district is represented by Analilia Mejia (D, Glen Ridge) who was elected in a 2026 special election to serve for the remainder of the Congress following the resignation Mikie Sherrill (D, Montclair), who was elected Governor of New Jersey in 2025. New Jersey is represented in the United States Senate by Democrats Cory Booker (Newark, term ends 2027) and Andy Kim (Moorestown, term ends 2031).

For the 2026–2027 session, the 40th legislative district of the New Jersey Legislature is represented in the State Senate by Kristin Corrado (R, Totowa) and in the General Assembly by Al Barlas (R, Cedar Grove) and Christopher DePhillips (R, Wyckoff).

Passaic County is governed by a Board of County Commissioners, comprised of seven members who are elected at-large to staggered three-year terms office on a partisan basis, with two or three seats coming up for election each year as part of the November general election in a three-year cycle. At a reorganization meeting held in January, the board selects a Director and Deputy Director from among its members to serve for a one-year term. As of 2026, Passaic County's Commissioners are: Director Cassandra "Sandi" Lazzara (D), Little Falls, term as commissioner ends December 31, 2027; term as director ends 2026), Deputy Director Orlando Cruz (D, Paterson, term as commissioner and as deputy director ends 2026), Rodney DeVore (D, Paterson, 2027), Bruce James (D, Clifton, 2026) Michael Ramaglia (D, West Milford, 2028), Christina Schratz (D, Passaic, 2028) and Nick Veliky (D, Clifton, appointed to a term ending in 2027).

Constitutional officers, elected on a countywide basis, are County Clerk Danielle Ireland-Imhof (D, Hawthorne, 2028), Sheriff Thomas Adamo (D, Wayne, 2027) and Surrogate Zoila S. Cassanova (D, Wayne, 2026).

=== Politics ===
As of March 2011, there were a total of 6,950 registered voters in Totowa, of which 1,355 (19.5% vs. 31.0% countywide) were registered as Democrats, 2,562 (36.9% vs. 18.7%) were registered as Republicans and 3,030 (43.6% vs. 50.3%) were registered as Unaffiliated. There were 3 voters registered as Libertarians or Greens. Among the borough's 2010 Census population, 64.3% (vs. 53.2% in Passaic County) were registered to vote, including 80.5% of those ages 18 and over (vs. 70.8% countywide).

Gubernatorial election results for Totowa
Year	Republican		Democratic		Third party(ies)	
Year	No.	%	No.	%	No.	%
2025	3,027	62.93%	1,763	36.65%	20	0.42%
2021	2,827	69.58%	1,219	30.00%	17	0.42%
2017	2,061	60.89%	1,274	37.64%	50	1.48%
2013	2,201	68.25%	1,009	31.29%	15	0.47%
2009	2,299	62.03%	1,236	33.35%	171	4.61%
2005	1,977	57.20%	1,403	40.60%	76	2.20%

In the 2012 presidential election, Republican Mitt Romney received 57.2% of the vote (2,834 cast), ahead of Democrat Barack Obama with 42.1% (2,083 votes), and other candidates with 0.7% (35 votes), among the 5,004 ballots cast by the borough's 7,265 registered voters (52 ballots were spoiled), for a turnout of 68.9%. In the 2008 presidential election, Republican John McCain received 3,118 votes (58.0% vs. 37.7% countywide), ahead of Democrat Barack Obama with 2,026 votes (37.7% vs. 58.8%) and other candidates with 63 votes (1.2% vs. 0.8%), among the 5,375 ballots cast by the borough's 7,013 registered voters, for a turnout of 76.6% (vs. 70.4% in Passaic County). In the 2004 presidential election, Republican George W. Bush received 2,981 votes (57.1% vs. 42.7% countywide), ahead of Democrat John Kerry with 2,029 votes (38.8% vs. 53.9%) and other candidates with 24 votes (0.5% vs. 0.7%), among the 5,224 ballots cast by the borough's 6,686 registered voters, for a turnout of 78.1% (vs. 69.3% in the whole county).

Presidential elections results
Year	Republican	Democratic	Third Parties
2024	64.7% 3,970	31.4% 1,927	3.9% 136
2020	58.6% 3,804	39.3% 2,553	2.1% 59
2016	61.0% 3,323	36.1% 1,966	2.5% 136
2012	57.2% 2,834	42.1% 2,083	0.7% 35
2008	58.0% 3,118	37.7% 2,026	1.2% 63
2004	57.1% 2,981	38.8% 2,029	0.5% 24

In the 2013 gubernatorial election, Republican Chris Christie received 68.2% of the vote (2,201 cast), ahead of Democrat Barbara Buono with 31.3% (1,009 votes), and other candidates with 0.5% (15 votes), among the 3,338 ballots cast by the borough's 7,323 registered voters (113 ballots were spoiled), for a turnout of 45.6%. In the 2009 gubernatorial election, Republican Chris Christie received 2,299 votes (60.3% vs. 43.2% countywide), ahead of Democrat Jon Corzine with 1,236 votes (32.4% vs. 50.8%), Independent Chris Daggett with 142 votes (3.7% vs. 3.8%) and other candidates with 29 votes (0.8% vs. 0.9%), among the 3,811 ballots cast by the borough's 6,967 registered voters, yielding a 54.7% turnout (vs. 42.7% in the county).

United States Senate election results for Totowa1
Year	Republican		Democratic		Third party(ies)	
Year	No.	%	No.	%	No.	%
2024	3,715	64.58%	1,816	31.57%	222	3.86%
2018	2,899	63.15%	1,461	31.82%	231	5.03%
2012	2,595	58.33%	1,793	40.30%	61	1.37%
2006	1,986	60.73%	1,242	37.98%	42	1.28%

United States Senate election results for Totowa2
Year	Republican		Democratic		Third party(ies)	
Year	No.	%	No.	%	No.	%
2020	3,562	57.02%	2,578	41.27%	107	1.71%
2014	2,055	68.52%	928	30.94%	16	0.53%
2013	1,152	65.90%	573	32.78%	23	1.32%
2008	2,631	56.19%	1,987	42.44%	64	1.37%

== Emergency services ==
=== Police ===
The Borough of Totowa Police Department, located within the Totowa Municipal Building on Totowa Road, is responsible for law enforcement.

=== Fire ===
The Totowa Fire Department (TFD) is an entirely volunteer fire department and was established in April 1908. The TFD consists of four "companies:" Volunteer Fire Company #1 (1908), Lincoln Fire Company (1908), Riverview Fire Company #3 (1925), and Fire Rescue Company #4 (1955). The TFD consists of 98 volunteer firefighters.

=== Ambulance ===
The Borough of Totowa First Aid Squad was founded in 1951 to provide a free, volunteer based service to the residents of Totowa. The Borough of Totowa First Aid Squad Auxiliary was also formed to help raise funds to support and benefit the first aid squad. During the day, between the hours of 6:00 am and 6:00 pm, the emergency services are provided by mutual aid agreements with surrounding municipalities or private ambulance companies.

=== Office of Emergency Management ===
The Borough of Totowa OEM is responsible for organizing, aiding, and providing emergency response units in the case of a "state of local disaster emergency". The OEM recruits volunteers of various disciplines to respond to local disasters and collaborates with both county and state officials in the event of a disaster.

== Education ==
Public school students in pre-kindergarten through eighth grade are educated by the Totowa Borough Public Schools. As of the 2022–23 school year, the district, comprised of two schools, had an enrollment of 908 students and 67.5 classroom teachers (on an FTE basis), for a student–teacher ratio of 13.5:1. Schools in the district (with 2022–23 enrollment data from the National Center for Education Statistics) are Memorial School with 416 students in grades PreK-3 and Washington Park School with 487 students in grades 4-8.

For ninth through twelfth grades, public school students attend Passaic Valley Regional High School, which also serves students from Little Falls and Woodland Park. The school facility is located in Little Falls Township. As of the 2022–23 school year, the high school had an enrollment of 1,039 students and 83.2 classroom teachers (on an FTE basis), for a student–teacher ratio of 12.5:1.

Students going into high school also have the option to apply to the Passaic County Technical Institute, a high school in Wayne that is available to most children living within Passaic County. Students apply for different trades within the application for the school. The school itself is free but does require acceptance to attend. About 80 students from Totowa attended PCTI (Passaic County Technical Institute) as of 2018.

The Academy of St. James of the Marches is a pre-K–8 Catholic school that operates under the supervision of the Roman Catholic Diocese of Paterson.

== Transportation ==
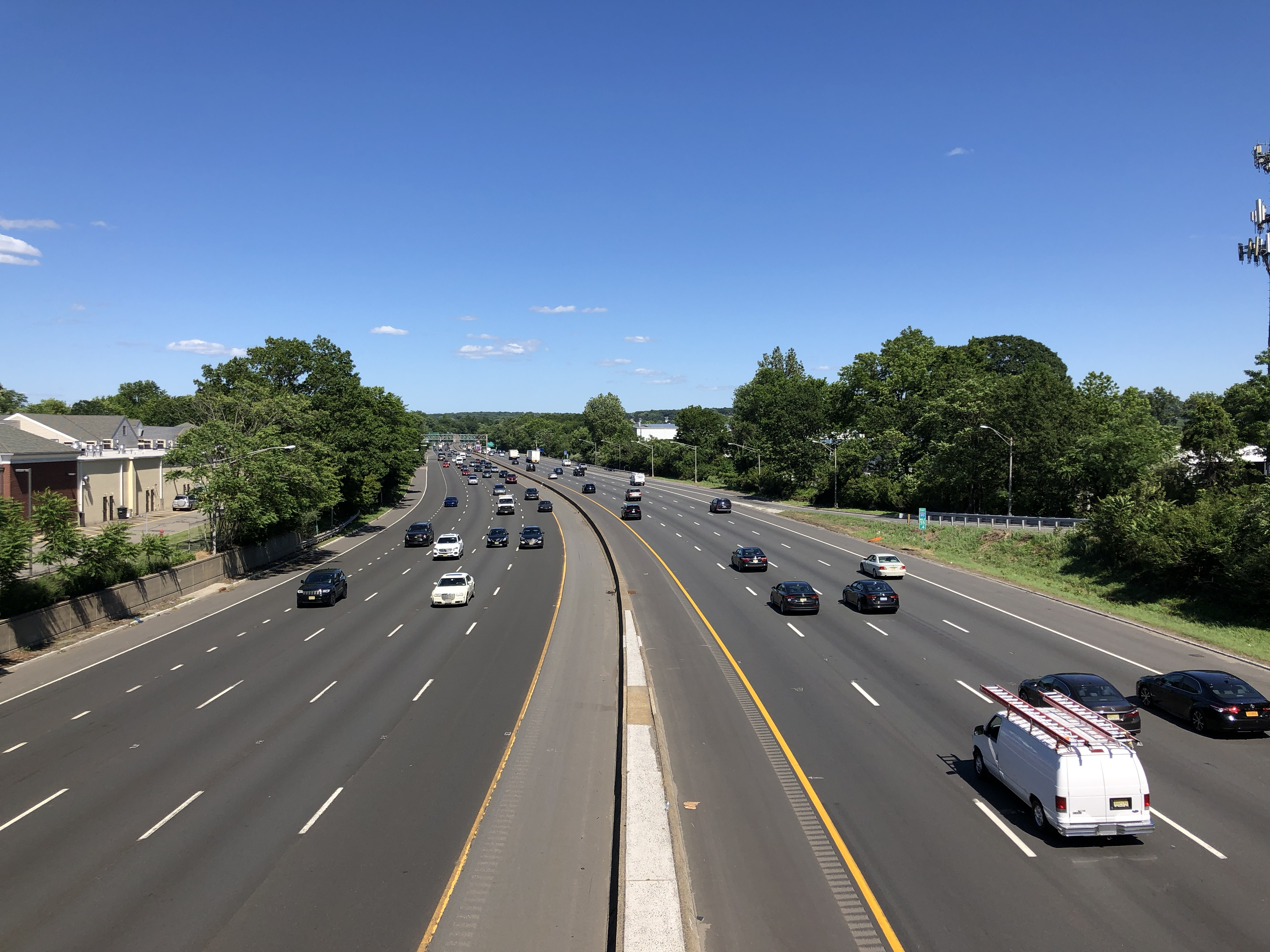
Interstate 80 eastbound in Totowa

=== Roads and highways ===
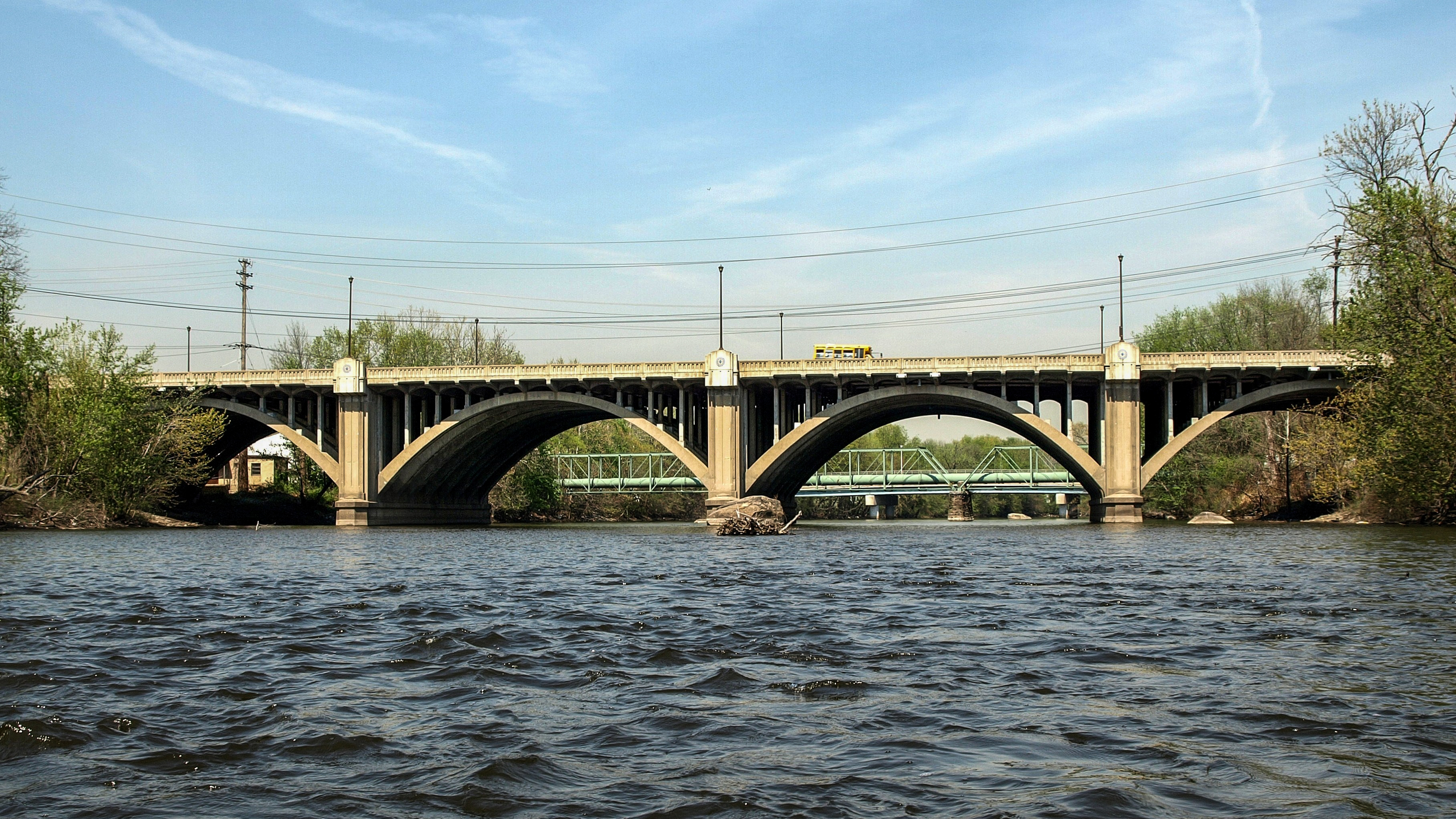
Route 46 Passaic River Bridge

As of May 2010, the borough had a total of 44.88 miles (72.23 km) of roadways, of which 30.30 miles (48.76 km) were maintained by the municipality, 10.75 miles (17.30 km) by Passaic County and 3.83 miles (6.16 km) by the New Jersey Department of Transportation.

Totowa is located on several major roadways, including Interstate 80 and U.S. Route 46. Nearby roadways include New Jersey Route 23, New Jersey Route 3, and the Garden State Parkway. Totowa is also crisscrossed by several Passaic County Routes, including New Jersey Route 62, CR 632, CR 642 and CR 644. There are several crossings of the Upper Passaic River.

=== Public transportation ===
NJ Transit provides bus service to and from the Port Authority Bus Terminal in Midtown Manhattan on the 193 and 197 routes, and local service on the 712 route. Train service is available on the Montclair-Boonton Line at the Little Falls station.

== Points of interest ==
- Annie's Road is a section of Riverview Drive between Totowa Road and Union Boulevard, which is rumored to be haunted by the ghost of a young woman killed in an accident.
- Totowa was home to the North Jersey Developmental Center, which serves 400 developmentally disabled citizens on its 188-acre (0.76 km^{2}) campus. The state announced a plan that would close the center in Totowa and another in Woodbridge Township, as part of a plan in which residents of the centers would be dispersed to smaller, community-based housing programs.
- There are more dead people than living in Totowa, as the borough includes four active cemeteries: Holy Sepulchre Roman Catholic Cemetery, Laurel Grove Memorial Park, Mount Nebo Jewish Cemetery and the A.M. White Lodge Jewish Cemetery.

== Media and culture ==
Totowa is located within the New York media market, with most of its daily papers available for sale or delivery. The area is also served by The Record and The Star-Ledger, which cover northern New Jersey.

A segment of the April 12, 2013, episode of the American version of the reality television series Undercover Boss was filmed in Totowa. In the segment, Tony Wells, the CMO for the home security provider ADT, visits Totowa to pose as a new employee being trained as a local sales representative.

== Notable people ==
People who were born in, residents of, or otherwise closely associated with Totowa include:

- Plaxico Burress (born 1977), NFL wide receiver who played for both the New York Giants and New York Jets
- Jeff Chase (born 1968), film and television actor who played for the Albany Firebirds of the Arena Football League
- Kristin Corrado (born 1965), politician who represents the 40th Legislative District in the New Jersey Senate
- Lou Duva (1922–2017), boxing trainer, along with his promoter sons, Dan and Dino Their offices remain in the borough
- D. C. Fontana (1939–2019), television script writer and story editor, best known for her work on the original Star Trek franchise and several western television series
- Kyle Gurrieri (born 1998), professional soccer player who plays for the Wilmington Hammerheads FC of the United Soccer League
- Lady Clover Honey, drag queen, comedian and television correspondent
- Ralph J. Marra Jr. (born 1953), acting United States Attorney for the District of New Jersey from December 2008 to October 2009
- Juelz Santana (born 1982), rapper and actor, who has been a member of East Coast hip hop group The Diplomats
- Ernie Smith (1899–1973), shortstop who played for the Chicago White Sox
- John Spencer (1946–2005), actor best known for his work on The West Wing
- Aidan Stokes (born 2008), soccer player who plays as a goalkeeper for Major League Soccer club New York Red Bulls and MLS Next Pro side New York Red Bulls II
- Mike Sullivan (born 1967), quarterback coach for the Denver Broncos
- Hubert Sumlin (1931–2011), guitarist for Howlin' Wolf who was a five-time Grammy Award Nominee and was inducted into the Blues Hall of Fame in 2008
