= Nigel Benn vs. Chris Eubank II =

Boxing match

Judgement Day
- Date: 9 October 1993
- Venue: Old Trafford, Greater Manchester, UK
- Title(s) on the line: WBC and WBO super middleweight titles

Tale of the tape
Boxer	(United Kingdom) Nigel Benn	(United Kingdom) Chris Eubank
Nickname	"Dark Destroyer"	"Simply the Best"
Hometown	Ilford, Greater London, UK	Brighton, East Sussex, UK
Pre-fight record	37–2 (32 KO)	35–0–1 (18 KO)
Age	29 years, 8 months	27 years, 2 months
Height	5 ft 9 in (175 cm)	5 ft 10 in (178 cm)
Weight	167 lb (76 kg)	168 lb (76 kg)
Style	Orthodox	Orthodox
Recognition	WBC; Super Middleweight Champion; The Ring; No. 4 Ranked Super Middleweight	WBO; Super Middleweight Champion; The Ring; No. 3 Ranked Super Middleweight

Result
- Split Draw

Nigel Benn vs. Chris Eubank II, billed as Judgement Day, was a professional boxing match contested on 9 October 1993, for the WBC and WBO super middleweight championship.

== Background ==
After defeating Benn in 1990 Eubank would defend his new WBO middleweight belt three times, before relinquishing to contest the vacant WBO super middleweight title against Michael Watson, who after winning eight of eleven rounds fell into a coma after a Eubank uppercut at the end of round 11, before the subsequent referee stoppage twenty seconds into round 12. Benn, who had also moved up to super middleweight, won the WBC super middleweight title in Italy, beating Mauro Galvano. With both men champions in the same weight division, a unification fight and three-year anticipated rematch was arranged by Don King for 9 October 1993. Over 42,000 crammed Old Trafford for this bout. Don King's contract stipulated that not only would the winner join his stable of fighters, but also the loser.

Unlike the first fight, this time Eubank's ring walk went off without a hitch, with ITV commentator Reg Gutteridge commenting when Eubank performed his customary vault over the ropes into the ring, “The ego has landed".

== The fight ==
The fight itself did not quite reach the heights of brutality of the first, as neither man was as badly hurt. However, there were flurries of punches at the ends of the rounds, with both boxers trying to claim the rounds knowing that there was more chance of the fight lasting the distance as the bout progressed. One such exchange saw Benn in a corner knocked through the ropes, though Eubank used his body as well and Benn was not badly hurt. The final round was thrilling, with both boxers told they needed it to win. Most boxing experts agree that this was a truly classic round, Gutteridge referring to the two 'magnificent warriors' at its climax.

The final scores were 115–113 Eubank, 114–113 Benn, and 114–114. The bout was declared a draw – Benn retained his WBC belt, Eubank his WBO championship. Don King had not written the event of a draw into the contract, and as a result, neither fighter was contractually bound to join him.

== Aftermath ==
The pair never fought again, despite a £6 million bout at Wembley stadium being touted for Eubank's eight-fight Sky deal. Benn faced Gerald McClellan, pound-for-pound one of the most devastating fighters of the 90s, and his career paralleled Eubank's when McClellan was paralyzed as a result of this bout. Benn was finished mentally and almost physically after this violent war and lost first his title then twice more to Steve Collins, who magnanimously claimed afterward that Benn was the greatest British boxer ever, and wished he could have fought him at his prime.

Eubank too lost his title and unbeaten record, also to Collins by a split decision. He retired and came out of retirement to face a young Joe Calzaghe, who beat him on points. He fought for the WBO cruiserweight title, losing another split decision to Carl Thompson, and the rematch when, ahead on points, the doctor stopped the fight due to Eubank's swollen eye. This time, he retired for good.

On the ITV documentary Best Ever Big Fight Live, former world champion Duke McKenzie said of the Benn–Eubank rivalry "It may never be rivaled". Barry McGuigan agreed, saying "There was real antipathy and ill-will there. But what fights, what fights."

The Hate Game, a book documenting this boxing rivalry, written by Ben Dirs, was published in 2013.

Nigel Benn's son and Chris Eubank's son were expected to fight in 2022. Chris Eubank Jr vs. Conor Benn was originally supposed to be held on 08 October 2022, but was postponed after Benn tested positive in a random drug test from UKAD. Eubank Jr and Conor Benn had finally agreed to fight on 26 April 2025 at the Tottenham Hotspur Stadium in which Eubank Jr defeated Benn by unanimous decision.

== Undercard ==
Confirmed bouts:

== Broadcasting ==
Country	Broadcaster
United Kingdom	ITV
United States	Showtime

Preceded by vs. Lou Gent	Nigel Benn's bouts 9 October 1993	Succeeded by vs. Henry Wharton
Preceded by vs. Ray Close	Chris Eubank's bouts 9 October 1993	Succeeded by vs. Graciano Rocchigiani
