= Nigel Benn vs. Gerald McClellan =

Boxing competition

Sudden Impact
- Date: 25 February 1995
- Venue: London Arena, Millwall, London, UK
- Title(s) on the line: WBC super-middleweight title

Tale of the tape
Boxer	(United Kingdom) Nigel Benn	(United States) Gerald McClellan
Nickname	"The Dark Destroyer"	"The G-Man"
Hometown	Ilford, London, UK	Freeport, Illinois, US
Pre-fight record	39–2–1 (32 KO)	31–2 (29 KO)
Age	31 years, 1 month	27 years, 4 months
Height	5 ft 9 in (175 cm)	6 ft 0 in (183 cm)
Weight	168 lb (76 kg)	165 lb (75 kg)
Style	Orthodox	Orthodox
Recognition	WBC; Super Middleweight Champion; The Ring; No. 3 Ranked Super Middleweight	WBC; No. 1 Ranked Super Middleweight; The Ring; No. 4 Ranked Super Middleweight; The Ring No. 7 ranked pound-for-pound fighter Former WBC Middleweight Champion

Result
- Benn wins by KO in the tenth round

Nigel Benn vs. Gerald McClellan, billed as Sudden Impact, was a professional boxing match contested on 25 February 1995 between WBC super-middleweight champion Nigel Benn and former WBC middleweight champion Gerald McClellan. It is widely regarded as one of the sport's most brutal and thrillingly violent encounters, with Benn defeating McClellan via a tenth-round knockout after McClellan was counted out while down on one knee. Shortly after the match ended, McClellan collapsed, fell into a coma for two weeks, and suffered severe permanent brain damage.

As a result of injuries he sustained during the fight, McClellan is blind and has hearing, memory and mobility problems. The fight has been described as "[one] that will be embedded forever in the memories" of those who watched it.

== Background ==
McClellan went into the fight as the bookmaker's favourite at odds of 1–3, with expectations that he would provide a repeat of his previous three fights, all won by knockout. The fight was joint-promoted by Frank Warren and Don King. McClellan himself predicted: "I can't see anything less than a vicious knockout".

== The fight ==
Within 35 seconds of the start of the first round, Benn was knocked out of the ring by McClellan, but was able to recover within the 20 seconds allowed to get back in the ring (20 seconds is only if you fall out of the ring) 10 seconds if you land on the ring. By the second round, McClellan was already struggling to breathe properly, and according to his sister Lisa, at the end of the sixth round he said to his trainer, Stan Johnson: "I wanna quit, Stan", a claim Johnson denies.

The following rounds were "a brutal, yet exhilarating back-and-forth contest that saw both combatants give as good as they took". Benn gained control of the fight for the following rounds, before McClellan came back to take the eighth by knocking down Benn for a second time. In the ninth, a tired Benn was missing with his "wild" punches, and the force of one caused him to fall forward and accidentally headbutt McClellan, an incident which appeared to significantly affect McClellan's physical well-being.

The fight entered the tenth round; McClellan had never fought past the eighth round in his career. At the midway point, Benn connected with a right hand, causing McClellan to drop to one knee. The referee began his count until McClellan stood back up at seven, and the fight continued after Asaro checked McClellan. Working for American television station Showtime, commentator Ferdie Pacheco described it as "the strangest knockdown I've seen". Shortly after, Benn connected with another right, and again McClellan dropped to a knee, this time allowing Asaro to count him out. Pacheco's fellow commentator Steve Albert opined that it was "one of the most bizarre endings to a fight", while Pacheco himself accused McClellan of quitting.

== Aftermath ==
After the fight ended, McClellan walked back to his corner, where he collapsed on his back after telling Johnson that he felt like there was "water running inside my head". Due to the British Boxing Board of Control amending their regulations following injuries Michael Watson suffered after a fight with Chris Eubank in 1991, and the 1994 death of Bradley Stone, an anaesthetist and paramedics were on hand to give immediate medical attention to him by placing him in a neck brace and giving him oxygen. Both fighters were soon rushed to the nearby Royal London Hospital – McClellan underwent brain surgery by Dr. John Sutcliffe, who removed a blood clot, while Benn collapsed in his dressing room after the fight due to exhaustion, but was released the following morning, before which he shook McClellan's hand and apologised. Sutcliffe gave McClellan a better than 50% chance of survival but declared that his career was finished. McClellan eventually spent two weeks in a coma, and only left the hospital in August 1995.

In the ride to the hospital, McClellan regained consciousness and asked Johnson, "What the fuck happened? I got knocked clean out, didn't I?", to which Johnson replied: "You didn't get knocked out. You went down to one knee and you walked back to the corner and you quit".

== Reaction ==
The front pages of the following day's newspapers featured images of McClellan lying in the ring, while there were calls for boxing to be banned. A spokesman for the British Medical Association said "How many more cases do we need of boxers playing roulette with their brains before the government and the British Boxing Board of Control take seriously what we say about the cumulative danger that boxing does?"

Benn was considering retirement, and described himself as "empty" and "distressed" following the fight. He released a statement which said "My heart goes out to Gerald McClellan and his family. It was a fierce and fair fight, but no one could imagine that such a great sporting spectacle could end so sadly".

Referee Alfred Asaro attempted to defend the lack of action he had taken in not stopping the fight earlier, saying: "I can't guess if a boxer who continues to go on punching has head pains", and attempted to lay the blame at the feet of McClellan's trainer Stan Johnson, saying it was he who should have intervened. ITV directors made the decision not to replay the fight, and were considering pulling out of the sport; a week later, ITV broadcast a fight between Naseem Hamed and Sergio Liendo, in which Liendo was knocked unconscious by Hamed – despite 13 million people having watched the Benn–McClellan fight, it would prove to be the final fight ITV would air for almost four years, when they aired Shea Neary vs. Juan Carlos Villareal.

== Undercard ==
Confirmed bouts:

== Broadcasting ==
Country	Broadcaster
Mexico	TV Azteca
United Kingdom	ITV
United States	Showtime

== Legacy ==
You know what? This is what you wanted to see. You got what you wanted to see.

— Nigel Benn.

As a result of the fight, McClellan is blind, hearing-impaired, suffers short-term memory loss, and needs to use a wheelchair. Throughout the first year following the fight, the brain damage McClellan suffered led him to refuse to believe he was now blind, instead thinking it was night-time, and he would become confused that he was not training for a future fight. To date, he still receives full-time care from his sisters Lisa and Sandra, and regularly asks them about the fight with Benn.

McClellan was paid just $54,000 for the fight, and an additional $100,000 from his promoter Don King as part of an insurance policy, a sum of money disputed by McClellan's family as being unrepresentative of the contract signed. In 2003, Lisa praised Gerald's amateur rival Roy Jones Jr. for the financial support he offered the McClellans in the years that followed. Jones Jr. said he offered the support as "nobody else even cares pretty much about how Gerald is doing from the boxing world". Photojournalist Teddy Blackburn published a book titled In The Other Corner as a tribute to McClellan and as an effort to raise funds.

Benn retired from boxing less than two years later following a second successive loss to Steve Collins, in which he retired after six "punishing" rounds, after which fans in the Nynex Arena booed and chanted "what a load of rubbish".

In 2007, Benn and McClellan met for the first time since the fight, at a charity dinner at Grosvenor House Hotel in London to raise funds for McClellan. In 2011, ITV produced a documentary of the fight titled The Fight of Their Lives. Ex-boxer Michael Watson, whose own career was ended in 1991 following a fight with Chris Eubank, described it as "disgusting" and "anti-boxing", alleging the documentary focused on boxing as a barbaric sport rather than showcasing the skill required of a top-level pugilist. In the documentary, Stan Johnson accused Benn of being "juiced up on something", an allegation that Benn denied, though admitting he was addicted to recreational drugs throughout his career.

Speaking to The Ring magazine, Benn claimed McClellan was the best all-round fighter he had ever boxed, saying "he had an incredible knockout ratio and he was a prolific puncher. There was a mile between him and anyone else", and shortly before the 20th anniversary, said the fight was a "career highlight".

The fight was depicted in the 2019 film Rise of the Footsoldier 4: Marbella, with Anthony Ferguson and Benn's son Conor portraying the two boxers.

Preceded by vs. J.C. Giménez Ferreyra	Nigel Benn's bouts 25 February 1995	Succeeded by vs. Vincenzo Nardiello
Preceded by vs. Julian Jackson II	Gerald McClellan's bouts 25 February 1995	Retired
Awards
Preceded by ?	KO Magazine Fight of the Year; 1995	Succeeded by ?
