= Nigel Benn vs. Chris Eubank =

Boxing match

Who's Fooling Who?
- Date: 18 November 1990
- Venue: National Exhibition Centre, Birmingham, West Midlands
- Title(s) on the line: WBO middleweight title

Tale of the tape
Boxer	Nigel Benn	Chris Eubank
Nickname	Dark Destroyer	Simply the Best
Hometown	Ilford, Greater London, UK	Brighton, East Sussex, UK
Pre-fight record	27–1 (25 KO)	24–0 (14 KO)
Age	26 years, 9 months	24 years, 3 months
Height	5 ft 9 in (175 cm)	5 ft 10 in (178 cm)
Weight	160 lb (73 kg)	159 1/2 lb (72 kg)
Style	Orthodox	Orthodox
Recognition	WBO; Middleweight Champion; The Ring; No. 4 Ranked Middleweight	WBA; No. 5 Ranked Middleweight; The Ring; No. 10 Ranked Middleweight

Result
- Eubank wins by ninth-round TKO

Nigel Benn vs. Chris Eubank, billed as Who's Fooling Who?, was a professional boxing match contested on 18 November 1990, for the WBO middleweight championship.

== Background ==
Both Benn and Eubank fought at middleweight and super middleweight around the same time in 1985–97, and became rivals on both the domestic and world boxing scene. Benn won his first 22 consecutive bouts by knockout, earning the moniker 'the Dark Destroyer'. Eubank was the cocky, flamboyant upstart who began calling out Benn after his tenth bout. The rivalry grew, with both men swearing that they would knock the other man out.

Benn, having lost to Michael Watson, began to rebuild in America, winning the WBO middleweight title by knocking out Doug DeWitt. He then savaged Iran Barkley within one round in his first defence. Benn then agreed to meet Eubank with his title on the line, which set up the first fight. A rematch was held three years later.

Once Benn had agreed to the first fight with Eubank, his entourage began plotting ways to demoralise Eubank and 'even things up'. They decided to sabotage his entrance music. As Eubank made his ring walk to the sound of Tina Turner's 'Simply the Best', the record suddenly stopped. Eubank ignored this, and made his way to the ring apron and vaulted to the rope as per usual.

== The fight ==
Eubank ran out sideways before turning and striking Benn with a right cross, clearly hoping for a surprise knockout. Benn stalked the challenger with pace, and the opening rounds are remembered for their lack of jabs or range finding punches. In the fourth round, Eubank took a ferocious right uppercut to the chin when breaking from a clinch. The blow caused him to bite his tongue, leaving a severe gash which led to copious amounts of blood being swallowed. Eubank hid this evidence from his corner, afraid of a doctor stoppage. Benn's eye was swollen shut by the fifth round, and in the sixth Eubank began throwing shots at Benn who was covering up on the ropes. Benn caught Eubank with a low blow, and with no points deducted used his advantage by pounding Eubank's body. Eubank fought back in the seventh, and with scores fairly even the fighters began the eighth round.

A more wary Benn now sought to catch Eubank with flashing overhand shots followed by short hooks. Eubank was trapped in the corner when an overhand right caught him on top of the head, knocking him down. He was up quickly, claiming it was a slip, but took the eight count regardless from Richard Steele. Eubank finished the round strongly and posed and preened between the rounds. The ninth was an even round until Eubank missed with a right and Benn caught him with a left hook which landed on the unbalanced Eubank's rear, sending him down. Standing up, Eubank circled Benn before releasing a left right combination, and a left hook which staggered Benn. Benn survived the flurry and clinched, but a straight right from Eubank sent him into a corner, and Steele stepped in to end the flurry with five seconds left of round nine, ending what he called "the most dramatic fight I've ever refereed".

== Aftermath ==
DVD cover

Eubank would defend his new title three times, relinquishing to contest the vacant WBO super middleweight title against the ill-fated Michael Watson, who after winning eight of eleven rounds fell into a coma after an Eubank uppercut at the end of round 11, before the subsequent referee stoppage twenty seconds into round 12. Benn, who had also moved up to super middleweight, won the WBC super middleweight title in Italy, beating Mauro Galvano. With both men champions in the same weight division, a unification fight and three-year anticipated rematch was arranged by Don King for 9 October 1993.

=== Rematch ===
Over 42,000 crammed Old Trafford for the rematch. Don King's contract stipulated that not only would the winner join his stable of fighters, but also the loser.

This time Eubank's ring walk went off without a hitch, commentator Reg Gutteridge making the classic call when Eubank performed his customary vault over the ropes into the ring, saying “The ego has landed”. The fight itself did not quite reach the heights of brutality of the first, as neither man was as badly hurt.

The final scores were 115–113 Eubank, 114–113 Benn, and 114–114. The bout was declared a draw – Benn retained his WBC belt, Eubank his WBO championship. Don King had not written the event of a draw into the contract, and as a result, neither fighter was contractually bound to join him.

=== Chris Eubank Jr vs. Conor Benn ===
Eubank's son, Chris Eubank Jr. and Benn's son, Conor Benn, fought in a unanimous decision win for Eubank Jr on 26 April 2025 at Tottenham Hotspur Stadium. The elder Eubank and Benn were in their sons' corners for the fight.

=== Chris Eubank Jr vs. Conor Benn II ===
On Saturday, 15 November 2025, Chris Eubank Jr vs. Conor Benn II took place at Tottenham Hotspur Stadium. Benn won the rematch via unanimous decision in a dominant performance, knocking Eubank down twice in the final round.

== Undercard ==
Confirmed bouts:

== Broadcasting ==
Country	Broadcaster
Mexico	Televisa
United Kingdom	ITV
United States	CBS

Preceded by vs. Iran Barkley	Nigel Benn's bouts 18 November 1990	Succeeded by vs. Robbie Sims
Preceded by vs. Reginaldo Dos Santos	Chris Eubank's bouts 18 November 1990	Succeeded by vs. Dan Sherry
