= Nigel Benn vs. Iran Barkley =

Boxing match

- Date: August 18, 1990
- Venue: Bally's Las Vegas, Paradise, Nevada
- Title(s) on the line: WBO middleweight title

Tale of the tape
Boxer	Nigel Benn	Iran Barkley
Nickname	The Dark Destroyer	The Blade
Hometown	London, England	The Bronx, New York, U.S.
Purse	$400,000	$200,000
Pre-fight record	26–1 (24 KO)	25–5 (16 KO)
Age	26 years, 6 months	30 years, 3 months
Height	5 ft 9 1/2 in (177 cm)	6 ft 1 in (185 cm)
Weight	159 lb (72 kg)	160 lb (73 kg)
Style	Orthodox	Orthodox
Recognition	WBO; Middleweight Champion; The Ring; No. 8 Ranked Middleweight	IBF; No. 4 Ranked Middleweight; WBA; No. 8 Ranked Middleweight; WBC; No. 12 Ranked Middleweight; The Ring; No. 5 Ranked Middleweight; Former WBC middleweight champion

Result
- Benn wins via 1st round TKO

Nigel Benn vs. Iran Barkley was a professional boxing match contested on August 18, 1990, for the WBO middleweight title.

== Background ==
After losing his WBC middleweight title to Roberto Durán in February 1989, Iran Barkley would get a shot at the IBF's version of the middleweight title when he challenged champion Michael Nunn six months later, though he would lose via unanimous decision. Despite the loss, Barkley secured another middleweight title fight, this time against the inaugural WBO champion Doug DeWitt. However, the fight, which was scheduled to take place on January 15, 1990, on the undercard of the George Foreman–Gerry Cooney fight, was called off after Barkley had to withdraw after suffering a torn retina in his left eye. Matthew Hilton was subsequently named as Barkley's replacement.

DeWitt defeated Hilton and then was matched up against Nigel Benn for his next defense. Benn dominated the fight, knocking DeWitt down four times en route to a technical knockout victory. In July, after Barkley's left eye finally healed and he was cleared to return to boxing, the Benn–Barkley fight was made official.

== The fight ==
As soon as the opening bell rang, Benn quickly attacked Barkley with a combination that left Barkley stunned and backed into the corner. Barkley, caught off guard by Benn's aggressive start, attempted to clinch but was unable to do so and was caught with a left hook that sent him down only 20 seconds in. Barkley answered referee's Carlos Padilla Jr.'s 10-count at six and continued the fight as Benn continue to wildly throw big power punches that Barkley was able to mostly dodge before countering with a left hand that sent Benn back into the ropes. Barkley continue to attack Benn while he was against the ropes but Benn was able to weather the attack and hit Barkley with several big punches to regain control of the fight and again sent Barkley down with a right-left combination, landing an illegal punch while Barkley was on his knees though the referee did not punish Benn for the infraction. A dazed Barkley again got back up but was quickly sent down for the third time. With the three knockdown rule in effect, Padilla, unsure if Barkley was knockdown or slipped, briefly consulted members of the Nevada State Athletic Commission, who ruled that Barkley had indeed been knockdown, resulting in the fight being immediately stopped and Benn awarded the victory via technical knockout.

== Aftermath ==
Benn would return to the UK and meet Chris Eubank three months later in Birmingham. After losing to Benn, Barkley underwent surgery for a detached retina and was inactive for a year.

== Fight card ==
Confirmed bouts:

Weight Class	Weight		vs.		Method	Round	Notes
Middleweight	160 lbs.	Nigel Benn (c)	def.	Iran Barkley	TKO	1/12	^{Note 1}
Super Lightweight	140 lbs.	Charles Murray	def.	Salvador Villa	KO	1/8
Bantamweight	118 lbs.	Eddie Cook	def.	Martin Perez Ramirez	KO	2/6
Flyweight	112 lbs.	Scotty Olson	def.	Robert Garza	TKO	2/6
Super Middleweight	168 lbs.	John McClain	def.	Joey DeGrandis	UD	4/4

^Note 1 For WBO middleweight title

== Broadcasting ==
Country	Broadcaster
Mexico	Televisa
Philippines	GMA Network
United Kingdom	ITV
United States	ABC

Preceded by vs. Doug DeWitt	Nigel Benn's bouts 18 August 1990	Succeeded by vs. Chris Eubank
Preceded by vs. Michael Nunn	Iran Barkley's bouts 18 August 1990	Succeeded by vs. Juan Hernandez
