= Rod Carr =

Rod, Rodney, or Roderick Carr may refer to:

- Rod Carr (administrator), New Zealand businessman and university administrator
- Rod Carr (boxer) (born 1968), Australian boxer
- Roderick Carr (1891–1971), Royal Air Force officer from New Zealand
