= Ben Dirs =

British freelance writer & journalist

Ben Dirs is a freelance writer and journalist. He was a sports journalist for the BBC news website from 2001 to 2017. Whilst at the BBC he covered a wide range of major sporting events. He provided live blogging on sports including boxing, golf and rugby for people who cannot watch live television coverage, often for people who live abroad.

Dirs is the author of seven books.

- We Could be Heroes: One Van, Two Blokes and Twelve World Championships with Tom Fordyce published 3 July 2009, charting the madcap escapades that resulted from trying to become the world champion in something.
- Karma Chameleons: No-one said the search for happiness would be dignified was published in 2010.
- Everywhere We Went: Top Tales from Cricket's Barmy Army about the Barmy Army was published in 2012.
- The Hate Game: Benn, Eubank and Boxing's Bitterest Rivalry, documenting the boxing matches between Nigel Benn and Chris Eubank was published in 2013.
- Box to Box: From Premier League to British Boxing Champion, the autobiography of Curtis Woodhouse was published in 2016.
- 401: The Extraordinary Story of the Man who Ran 401 Marathons in 401 Days and Changed his Life Forever (2018)
- Death Row – The Final Minutes (2018)
- “Too Many Reasons to Live” the Rob Burrow Story 2021.
