= Robin Reid (boxer) =

English boxer

Personal information
- Nicknames: The Reaper Man; Grim Reaper
- Nationality: British
- Born: 19 February 1971 (age 55) Kingston, Jamaica
- Height: 5 ft 11 in (180 cm)
- Weight: Super-middleweight

Boxing career
- Reach: 76 in (193 cm)
- Stance: Orthodox

Boxing record
- Total fights: 51
- Wins: 42
- Win by KO: 29
- Losses: 8
- Draws: 1
Medal record
Men's amateur boxing
Representing Great Britain
Olympic Games
Bronze medal – third place	1992 Barcelona	Light-middleweight

Robin Reid (born 19 February 1971) is a British former professional boxer who competed from 1993 to 2012. He held the WBC super-middleweight title from 1996 to 1997, and the IBO super-middleweight title from 2004 to 2005. As an amateur, Reid represented Great Britain at 1992 Summer Olympics, winning a bronze medal in the light-middleweight division.

== Amateur career ==
=== Highlights ===
- 1988 2nd at Light Middleweight at Junior Tournament in Bratislava, Czechoslovakia. Lost to Marco Theuer of Germany in the final
- 1989 2nd at Light Middleweight at Junior World Championships in Bayamon, Puerto Rico. Lost to Leonides Bedey of Cuba in the final on points.
- 1990 3rd at Light Middleweight in ABA championships
- 1991 fought as a Light Middleweight at World Championships in Sydney, Australia. Results were:
  - Defeated Charmstrong Karnshupan (Thailand) TKO 1
  - Lost to Israel Akopkokhian (Soviet Union) points
- 1992 1st place at Canada Cup as a Light Middleweight. Results were:
  - Defeated Darren Obah (Australia) points
  - Defeated Ray Downey (Canada) points
  - Defeated Alexander Pavelets (Ukraine) points
- Won the Light Middleweight bronze medal for Great Britain at the 1992 Olympics in Barcelona, Spain. Results were:
  - Defeated Marcus Thomas (Barbados) KO 1
  - Defeated Leonidas Maleckis (Lithuania) points
  - Defeated Ole Klemetsen (Norway) points
  - Lost to Orhan Delibaş (Netherlands) points

51-16 Amateur record.

== Professional career ==
Reid began his professional career in 1993. In 1996, he captured the World Boxing Council super middleweight title by defeating Vincenzo Nardiello by a TKO in 7. He then successfully defended his title three times, including a victory over Henry Wharton and Hacine Cherifi. Reid then lost his title to Thulani Malinga via a unanimous decision. He then lost decisions to Joe Calzaghe and Silvio Branco.

In 2003 Reid faced IBF and WBA super middleweight title holder Sven Ottke, who took a narrow and highly disputed unanimous decision over Reid. He was keen on a rematch with Calzaghe, but the latter was more interested in pursuing other current and former champions such as Mitchell, Brewer (both of whom he defeated) and Ottke himself (who took only one more fight, then retired without fighting Calzaghe, leaving his titles vacant). In 2005, Reid landed a shot at IBF super middleweight title holder Jeff Lacy, who had taken one of Ottke's vacated titles. A victory would have made a rematch (which would have been both a grudge match and a WBO/IBF unification fight) with Calzaghe almost inevitable, but Lacy dominated him and won via an 8th-round TKO, and it was Lacy who went on to fight Calzaghe and lose a lop-sided 12-round decision.

After the Lacy fight, Reid beat Jessie Brinkley and then suffered a retired hurt defeat at the hands of Carl Froch in a British super-middleweight fight in November 2007, he announced his decision to retire soon after this fight.

In January 2009 Reid said on Liverpool's City Talk radio station that he would like to come out of retirement and fight Tony Dodson for the British super-middleweight title, providing Dodson overcomes Brian Magee on 28 March at the Echo Arena, Liverpool, Merseyside.

“I would love to fight Tony Dodson for the British super-middleweight title at the ECHO Arena, no disrespect to Tony as I think he is a great fighter, but I have never held the Lonsdale Belt and would love the chance to put it around my waist.

“Obviously, I feel like I still have something left to offer the sport and a fight with Tony in Liverpool – two Scousers going at it for the British title – would be the fight that Liverpool fight fans would want to see most.”

Reid competed in the super middleweight prizefighter competition on 23 March 2011, losing in his first fight via unanimous decision to Tobias Webb. He was to fight three more times over the following year, two victories being followed by a fifth-round defeat which sent him back into retirement.

== Personal life ==
Reid is mixed race; he is half black Jamaican. Reid briefly dabbled in nude modeling, posing for sexually explicit magazine photographs in 2000 and 2002.

In 2010, Reid took over a lead role in the controversial movie Killer Bitch from the MMA fighter Alex Reid who had walked out of the film. His latest film role is in 'Mob Handed'.

Reid still retains strong ties to professional boxing, acting as a judge. In September 2016 he joined the Advisory Board of the World Boxing Federation.

== Professional boxing record ==
51 fights	42 wins	8 losses
By knockout	29	3
By decision	13	5
Draws	1	

No.	Result	Record	Opponent	Type	Round, time	Date	Location	Notes
51	Loss	42–8–1	Kenny Anderson	TKO	5 (12), 2:45	20 Oct 2012	Motorpoint Arena, Sheffield, England	For vacant British super-middleweight title
50	Win	42–7–1	Daniel Cadman	TKO	5 (8), 1:20	28 Jan 2012	York Hall, London, England	
49	Win	41–7–1	Wayne Reed	TKO	4 (6), 2:52	25 Jun 2011	Hillsborough Leisure Centre, Sheffield, England	
48	Loss	40–7–1	Tobias Webb	UD	3	23 Mar 2011	Liverpool Olympia, Liverpool, England	Prizefighter 17: super-middleweight quarter-final
47	Win	40–6–1	Jamie Ambler	PTS	4	26 Feb 2011	De Vere Whites Hotel, Bolton, England	
46	Loss	39–6–1	Carl Froch	RTD	5 (12), 3:00	9 Nov 2007	Nottingham Arena, Nottingham, England	For British super-middleweight title
45	Win	39–5–1	Jesse Brinkley	UD	8	30 Mar 2007	Metro Radio Arena, Newcastle, England	
44	Loss	38–5–1	Jeff Lacy	RTD	7 (12), 3:00	6 Aug 2005	St. Pete Times Forum, Tampa, Florida, U.S.	Lost IBO super-middleweight title; For IBF super-middleweight title
43	Win	38–4–1	Ramdane Serdjane	PTS	6	13 Feb 2005	International Centre, Brentwood, England	
42	Win	37–4–1	Brian Magee	UD	12	26 Jun 2004	Kings Hall, Belfast, Northern Ireland	Won IBO super-middleweight title
41	Loss	36–4–1	Sven Ottke	UD	12	13 Dec 2003	Nuremberg Arena, Nuremberg, Germany	For WBA (Super) and IBF super-middleweight titles
40	Win	36–3–1	Dmitry Adamovich	KO	4 (8), 1:21	24 Oct 2003	York Hall, London, England	
39	Win	35–3–1	Willard Lewis	TKO	6 (8), 2:33	4 Oct 2003	Stadthalle, Zwickau, Germany	
38	Win	34–3–1	Enrique Campos	TKO	8 (8)	5 Apr 2003	Arena Leipzig, Leipzig, Germany	
37	Win	33–3–1	Mondli Mbonambi	TKO	2 (10), 2:06	29 Nov 2002	Liverpool Olympia, Liverpool, England	
36	Win	32–3–1	Francisco Antonio Mora	UD	12	10 Jul 2002	Wembley Conference Centre, London, England	Retained WBF (Federation) super-middleweight title
35	Win	31–3–1	Julio César Vásquez	UD	12	19 Dec 2001	SkyDome Arena, Coventry, England	Retained WBF (Federation) super-middleweight title
34	Win	30–3–1	Jorge Andres Sclarandi	KO	3 (12)	20 Oct 2001	Kelvin Hall, Glasgow, Scotland	Retained WBF (Federation) super-middleweight title
33	Win	29–3–1	Soon Botes	TKO	4 (12), 2:58	14 Jul 2001	Liverpool Olympia, Liverpool, England	Retained WBF (Federation) super-middleweight title
32	Win	28–3–1	Roman Babaev	TKO	3 (12), 2:54	19 May 2001	Wembley Arena, London, England	Retained WBF (Federation) super-middleweight title
31	Win	27–3–1	Mike Gormley	TKO	1 (12)	8 Dec 2000	Crystal Palace National Sports Centre, London, England	Won vacant WBF (Federation) super-middleweight title
30	Loss	26–3–1	Silvio Branco	UD	12	24 Jun 2000	Hampden Park, Glasgow, Scotland	For WBU super-middleweight title
29	Loss	26–2–1	Joe Calzaghe	SD	12	13 Feb 1999	Telewest Arena, Newcastle, England	For WBO super-middleweight title
28	Win	26–1–1	Graham Townsend	TKO	6 (8), 2:42	18 Apr 1998	NYNEX Arena, Manchester, England	
27	Loss	25–1–1	Thulani Malinga	UD	12	19 Dec 1997	London Arena, London, England	Lost WBC super-middleweight title
26	Win	25–0–1	Hacine Cherifi	SD	12	11 Sep 1997	Kingsway Leisure Centre, Widnes, England	Retained WBC super-middleweight title
25	Win	24–0–1	Henry Wharton	MD	12	3 May 1997	NYNEX Arena, Manchester, England	Retained WBC super-middleweight title
24	Win	23–0–1	Giovanni Pretorius	KO	7 (12), 2:10	8 Feb 1997	London Arena, London, England	Retained WBC super-middleweight title
23	Win	22–0–1	Vincenzo Nardiello	TKO	7 (12), 2:59	12 Oct 1996	Mediolanum Forum, Assago, Italy	Won WBC super-middleweight title
22	Win	21–0–1	Donnie Penelton	TKO	4 (8)	31 Aug 1996	Point Theatre, Dublin, Ireland	
21	Win	20–0–1	Mark Lee Dawson	KO	5 (8)	8 Jun 1996	Telewest Arena, Newcastle, England	
20	Win	19–0–1	Hunter Clay	TKO	1 (8)	26 Apr 1996	Institute of Sport, Cardiff, Wales	
19	Win	18–0–1	Andy Flute	TKO	7 (8)	16 Mar 1996	Exhibition and Conference Centre, Glasgow, Scotland	
18	Win	17–0–1	Paul Mason	KO	2 (8), 1:08	26 Jan 1996	Metropole Hotel, Brighton, England	
17	Win	16–0–1	Danny Juma	PTS	8	10 Nov 1995	Moorways Sports Centre, Derby, England	
16	Win	15–0–1	Trevor Ambrose	KO	5 (6)	15 Sep 1995	Leisure Centre, Mansfield, England	
15	Win	14–0–1	John Duckworth	PTS	8	22 Jul 1995	London Arena, London, England	
14	Win	13–0–1	Martin Jolley	KO	1 (8), 0:41	10 Jun 1995	G-Mex Centre, Manchester, England	
13	Win	12–0–1	Steve Goodwin	KO	1 (8)	6 May 1995	Bath & West Showground, Shepton Mallet, England	
12	Win	11–0–1	Marvin O'Brien	TKO	6 (8), 2:47	4 Mar 1995	Forum, Livingston, Scotland	
11	Win	10–0–1	Bruno Wuestenberghs	TKO	1 (8)	4 Feb 1995	National Ice Rink, Cardiff, Wales	
10	Win	9–0–1	Chris Richards	TKO	3 (6), 0:29	19 Nov 1994	National Ice Rink, Cardiff, Wales	
9	Win	8–0–1	Andrew Jervis	TKO	1 (6)	17 Aug 1994	Hillsborough Leisure Centre, Sheffield, England	
8	Win	7–0–1	Andrew Furlong	KO	2 (6), 2:40	4 Jun 1994	National Ice Rink, Cardiff, Wales	
7	Win	6–0–1	Kesem Clayton	TKO	1 (6)	9 Apr 1994	Leisure Centre, Mansfield, England	
6	Draw	5–0–1	Danny Juma	PTS	6	18 Dec 1993	Wythenshawe Forum, Manchester, England	
5	Win	5–0	Ernie Loveridge	PTS	4	9 Oct 1993	Old Trafford, Manchester, England	
4	Win	4–0	Jose Angel Garcia	PTS	6	10 Sep 1993	Alamodome, San Antonio, Texas, U.S.	
3	Win	3–0	Andrew Furlong	PTS	6	10 Apr 1993	Dillwyn Llewelyn Centre, Swansea, Wales	
2	Win	2–0	Julian Eavis	TKO	2 (4), 2:02	6 Mar 1993	Exhibition and Conference Centre, Glasgow, Scotland	
1	Win	1–0	Mark Lee Dawson	TKO	1 (4)	27 Feb 1993	Goresbrook Leisure Centre, London, England	

Sporting positions
Minor world boxing titles
Vacant Title last held by Mads Larsen	WBF (Federation) super-middleweight champion 8 December 2000 – 2003; Vacated	Vacant Title next held by William Gare
Preceded by Brian Magee	IBO super-middleweight champion 26 June 2004 – 6 August 2005	Succeeded by Jeff Lacy
Major world boxing titles
Preceded by Vincenzo Nardiello	WBC super-middleweight champion 12 October 1996 – 19 December 1997	Succeeded by Thulani Malinga
