= Guerino =

Guerino is both an Italian given name and a surname. Notable people with the name include:

== Given names ==
- Guerino Bertocchi (1907–1981), Italian mechanic and racing driver
- Guerino Capretti (born 1982), German footballer
- Guerino Gottardi (born 1970), Italian-Swiss footballer
- Guerino Minervino Neto (born 1950), Brazilian footballer
- Guerino Mazzola (born 1947), Swiss mathematician
- Guerino Petronelli (1923–2012), American boxing trainer

== Middle names ==
- Joseph Guerino Tripodi (born 1967), Australian politician
- Renato Guerino Turano (1942–2021), Italian-American politician and businessman

== See also ==
- Guerino Vanoli Basket, an Italian professional basketball team
