= Richie Woodhall =

English boxer (born 1968)

Personal information
- Nationality: English
- Born: 17 April 1968 (age 58) Birmingham, England
- Weight: Middleweight; Super-middleweight

Boxing career
- Stance: Orthodox

Boxing record
- Total fights: 29
- Wins: 26
- Win by KO: 16
- Losses: 3
Medal record
Men's amateur boxing
Representing Great Britain
Olympic Games
Bronze medal – third place	1988 Seoul	Light-middleweight
Representing England
Commonwealth Games
Gold medal – first place	1990 Auckland	Light-middleweight

Richie Woodhall (born 17 April 1968) is a British former professional boxer who competed from 1990 to 2000. He held the WBC super-middleweight title from 1998 to 1999, as well as the Commonwealth middleweight title from 1992 to 1995, and the European middleweight title from 1995 to 1996. As an amateur, Woodhall won a gold medal at the 1990 Commonwealth Games and bronze at the 1988 Summer Olympics, both in the light-middleweight division.

Following his retirement from the sport, Woodhall has developed a broadcasting career with both the BBC and BT Sport as a sports pundit, on both television and radio. He currently co-commentates with Mike Costello on radio for some shows, while co-commentating with John Rawling on Setanta Sports at other times. Woodhall has commentated on numerous Olympic Games for the BBC, starting with Athens 2004 alongside Jim Neilly. This partnership continued into Beijing 2008 and London 2012. For the Rio 2016, Tokyo 2020 and Paris 2024 Olympics, Woodhall has been ringside alongside Ronald McIntosh.

He appeared as a body double for Brad Pitt in the 2000 film Snatch.

He was awarded an honorary MSc by the University of Chichester in 2008.

== Amateur career ==
- Olympic Games Bronze Medalist, Seoul South Korea 1988, losing to Roy Jones, Jr..
- Commonwealth Games Gold Medallist, Auckland New Zealand 1990
- England International Contests – 43

=== Olympic results ===
  - 1st round bye
  - Defeated Desmond Williams (Sierra Leone) 5-0
  - Defeated Apolinario Silveira (Angola) 5-0
  - Defeated Rey Rivera (Puerto Rico) 5-0
  - Lost to Roy Jones Jr. (United States) 5-0

== Professional career ==
Woodhall turned pro in 1990 and was undefeated as the Commonwealth Middleweight Champion from 1992 to 1995. He was then undefeated as the European Middleweight Champion from 1995 to 1996.

Woodhall defeated a number of useful fighters during this period, including; Future World Super Middle and World Light Heavyweight Champion Silvio Branco, Art Serwarno, Heath Todd, Jacques LeBlanc, Zdravko Kostic, Derek Wormald, Vito Gaudiosi and Royan Hammond.

In late 1996 he fought WBC middleweight title holder Keith Holmes. Woodhall went into this fight carrying an injury, but took the fight anyway. Woodhall did not perform as well has he might otherwise have, losing by 12th-round TKO.

In 1998 he moved up to Super Middleweight and after a tune up against Bernice Barber captured the WBC super middleweight title with a unanimous decision win over Thulani Malinga. He successfully defended the title twice, defeating fellow Briton and future World Champion Glenn Catley and former World Champ Vincenzo Nardiello before losing it to Markus Beyer by decision in 1999, a fight in which Woodhall was down in the 1st and twice in the 3rd. Woodhall rallied late in the fight and came close to stopping Beyer, however his revival came too late.

Woodhall bounced back with a win over the experienced Errol McDonald, setting him up for his final bout against Joe Calzaghe for the WBO super middleweight title.

On 16 December 2000, Woodhall was TKO'd in 10 rounds by Joe Calzaghe, after which Woodhall retired.

== Personal life ==
Woodhall grew up in Woodside, Telford and attended the local William Reynolds Primary and Junior School and Abraham Darby School. He is also a supporter of West Bromwich Albion F.C. He currently resides in Lightmoor, Telford, Shropshire.

Woodhall also is a reporter for BBC Midlands' Inside Out Programme. He is married to childhood sweetheart Jayne and has 3 children, Jack, Jake, and Amey Woodhall, an actress who has appeared in television shows such as Emmerdale and Coronation Street.

=== In film ===
Woodhall was a body double for Brad Pitt in a fight scene in the movie Snatch, directed by Guy Ritchie. He trained Matthew Marsden for his role in the movie Shiner.

== Professional boxing record ==
29 fights	26 wins	3 losses
By knockout	16	2
By decision	10	1

No.	Result	Record	Opponent	Type	Round, time	Date	Location	Notes
29	Loss	26–3	Joe Calzaghe	TKO	10 (12), 0:28	16 Dec 2000	Sheffield Arena, Sheffield, England	For WBO super-middleweight title
28	Win	26–2	Errol McDonald	TKO	8 (10)	6 May 2000	Ballsporthalle, Frankfurt, Germany	
27	Loss	25–2	Markus Beyer	UD	12	23 Oct 1999	Ice Rink, Telford, England	Lost WBC super-middleweight title
26	Win	25–1	Vincenzo Nardiello	TKO	6 (12), 1:44	13 Feb 1999	Telewest Arena, Newcastle, England	Retained WBC super-middleweight title
25	Win	24–1	Glenn Catley	MD	12	5 Sep 1998	Ice Rink, Telford, England	Retained WBC super-middleweight title
24	Win	23–1	Thulani Malinga	UD	12	27 Mar 1998	Ice Rink, Telford, England	Won WBC super-middleweight title
23	Win	22–1	Bernice Barber	TKO	3 (10), 2:48	11 Sep 1997	Kingsway Leisure Centre, Widnes, England	
22	Loss	21–1	Keith Holmes	TKO	12 (12), 2:32	19 Oct 1996	The Show Place Arena, Upper Marlboro, Maryland, US	For WBC middleweight title
21	Win	21–0	Derek Wormald	TKO	10 (12), 2:10	31 Jan 1996	Aston Villa Leisure Centre, Birmingham, England	Retained European middleweight title
20	Win	20–0	Zdravko Kostic	UD	12	25 Oct 1995	Ice Rink, Telford, England	Retained European middleweight title
19	Win	19–0	Silvio Branco	TKO	9 (12), 1:36	22 Feb 1995	Ice Rink, Telford, England	Won vacant European middleweight title
18	Win	18–0	Art Serwano	TKO	11 (12), 1:32	30 Nov 1994	Civic Hall, Wolverhampton, England	Retained Commonwealth middleweight title
17	Win	17–0	Jacques LeBlanc	PTS	12	5 Oct 1994	Civic Hall, Wolverhampton, England	Retained Commonwealth middleweight title
16	Win	16–0	Greg Lonon	TKO	6 (10)	16 Mar 1994	National Exhibition Centre, Birmingham, England	
15	Win	15–0	Heath Todd	TKO	7 (10), 2:45	1 Mar 1994	Town Hall, Dudley, England	
14	Win	14–0	Gerry Meekison	PTS	12	27 Oct 1993	West Bromwich, England	Retained Commonwealth middleweight title
13	Win	13–0	Royan Hammond	PTS	10	24 Apr 1993	National Exhibition Centre, Birmingham, England	
12	Win	12–0	Carlo Colarusso	PTS	8	16 Mar 1993	Civic Hall, Wolverhampton, England	
11	Win	11–0	Horace Fleary	PTS	8	4 Dec 1992	Telford, England	
10	Win	10–0	John Ashton	PTS	12	1 Oct 1992	Ice Rink, Telford, England	Retained Commonwealth middleweight title
9	Win	9–0	Vito Gaudiosi	KO	1 (12), 1:01	26 Mar 1992	Ice Rink, Telford, England	Won vacant Commonwealth middleweight title
8	Win	8–0	Graham Burton	TKO	2 (8)	4 Feb 1992	Leisure Centre, Alfreton, England	
7	Win	7–0	Colin Pitters	PTS	8	31 Oct 1991	Town Hall, Oakengates, England	
6	Win	6–0	Nigel Moore	TKO	1 (8), 2:44	29 Aug 1991	Town Hall, Oakengates, England	
5	Win	5–0	Marty Duke	TKO	4 (6)	30 May 1991	Methodist Central Hall, Birmingham, England	
4	Win	4–0	Seamus Casey	TKO	3 (6), 2:47	21 Feb 1991	Town Hall, Walsall, England	
3	Win	3–0	Chris Haydon	TKO	3 (6), 1:42	16 Jan 1991	Royal Albert Hall, London, England	
2	Win	2–0	Robert Harron	TKO	2 (4)	30 Nov 1990	Town Hall, Birmingham, England	
1	Win	1–0	Kevin Hayde	TKO	3 (4)	18 Oct 1990	Town Hall, Birmingham, England	

Sporting positions
Regional boxing titles
Vacant Title last held by Michael Watson	Commonwealth middleweight champion 26 March 1992 – February 1995; Vacated	Vacant Title next held by Robert McCracken
Vacant Title last held by Agostino Cardamone	European middleweight champion 22 February 1995 – June 1996; Vacated	Vacant Title next held by Alexander Zaitsev
World boxing titles
Preceded by Thulani Malinga	WBC super-middleweight champion 27 March 1998 – 23 October 1999	Succeeded by Markus Beyer
