= Rick Thornberry =

Australian boxer

Personal information
- Nickname: The Gatton Tiger
- Nationality: Australian
- Born: Rick Thornberry; 17 February 1968 (age 58) Gatton, Queensland, Australia
- Weight: Super-middleweight

Boxing career
- Stance: Orthodox

Boxing record
- Total fights: 32
- Wins: 27
- Win by KO: 12
- Losses: 5

Rick Thornberry (born 17 February 1968) is an Australian former professional boxer who competed from 1985 to 2002. He held the IBO super middleweight title in 1995 and challenged twice for major world championships; the WBO super middleweight title in 1999 and the IBF super middleweight title in 2002.

== Career ==
Thornberry made his debut in 1985 fighting just three times between 1985 and 1986. After seven years away from professional boxing Thornberry returned to the ring in 1993, initially suffering a defeat to Cruiserweight Colin Wilson but avenged it a few fights later.

After a string of victories, including a victory over Marc Bargero for the Australian Super Middleweight Title, Thornberry fought Rod Carr for the minor IBO World Super Middleweight Title in Crown Casino, Melbourne. Thornberry won via an 8th-round technical knockout.

In October 1996, Thornberry fought outside of Australia for the first time, challenging Henry Wharton for the Commonwealth (British Empire) Super Middleweight Title and suffered a fifth round defeat.

Thornberry bounced back with several wins, and climbed the WBO ranks by defeating Fiji's Frank Atu for the WBO Asia Pacific Super Middleweight Title and defending it against Ambrose Mlilo.

In June 1999, Thornberry now ranked as the WBO number one contender, travelled to Wales for the biggest night of his career, challenging Joe Calzaghe for the WBO World Super Middleweight Title. Calzaghe was expected to finish the fight early but suffered a hand injury in the third round and Thornberry managed to last all twelve rounds, losing a wide decision.

Almost three years and just two victories later Thornberry got the surprise chance to travel to Germany and face undefeated IBF champion Sven Ottke. Thornberry had limited success but managed to take the fight to the judges, once against losing by a wide decision.

Thornberrys final fight came at the end of 2002, the 34 year old suffering a late stoppage loss to future WBA World Champion Anthony Mundine.

== Controversy ==
In 2011 Thornberry was jailed for two years drug and gun possession. During a search for erratic driving in Brisbane, police uncovered several bags of methylamphetamine and a loaded semi-automatic pistol. Thornberry had been arrested for drug possession on previous occasions.
