= Henry Wharton (boxer) =

English boxer (born 1967)

Personal information
- Nationality: English
- Born: 23 November 1967 (age 58) Leeds, England
- Height: 5 ft 10 in (1.78 m)
- Weight: Super middleweight; Light heavyweight; Cruiserweight

Boxing career

Boxing record
- Total fights: 31
- Wins: 27
- Win by KO: 20
- Losses: 3
- Draws: 1

Henry Wharton (born 23 November 1967) is a British former professional boxer who competed from 1989 to 1998. He challenged three times for super middleweight world championships; the WBC twice, firstly in 1994 and again in 1997, and the WBO title in 1994. At regional level, he held the British super middleweight title in 1992; the Commonwealth super middleweight title from 1991 to 1996; and the EBU European super middleweight title from 1995 to 1996. Wharton is best remembered for his world title fights with Nigel Benn and Chris Eubank in 1994.

== Personal life ==
In 2012, Wharton was involved in a fight where he was cut with a machete as he fought three men. North Yorkshire Police said when speaking to The Press, "He's lucky to be alive". A few days earlier he was hit by a car after he reportedly tried to intervene in a pre-arranged bare-knuckle fight between members of the English Romany Travelling travelling community (which he is part of).

He currently resides in York. In 2013, Henry's Gym opened up on York Road. He is currently training professional George Davey who is signed under Frank Warren.

== Professional career ==
=== Early career ===
Wharton made his professional debut on 21 September 1989, scoring a first-round technical knockout (TKO) victory over Dean Murray at the Great Yorkshire Showground in Harrogate, England. After winning his next 9 fights, 7 by knockout, Wharton won the vacant Commonwealth super middleweight title on 27 June 1991, beating Australian Rod Carr via points decision. On 30 October, Wharton fought Lou Gent to a draw, retaining his Commonwealth title. He won his next three fights, two by stoppage, before challenging Fidel Castro Smith for the British super middleweight title on 23 September 1992, winning the title by points decision. Wharton won his next three fights, all by stoppage, bringing his record to 18–0–1 (13 KOs).

=== World championship attempts ===
On 26 February 1994, Wharton challenged Nigel Benn (37–2–1, 32 KOs) for the WBC super middleweight title at Earls Court Exhibition Hall, London, England. It would be Benn's fifth defence of the WBC title. Wharton went the distance with Benn, but ultimately lost by unanimous decision, with the three judges scoring the bout 117–112, 116–114 and 116–113.

His second attempt at a world title came just 10 months later on 10 December 1994, against undefeated WBO super middleweight champion Chris Eubank (40–0–2, 19 KOs) at G-Mex Centre, Manchester, England. It would be Eubank's fifteenth defence of his world title. Wharton again lost by unanimous decision, with the judges’ scorecards reading 118–112, 116–112 and 115–113.

Wharton's third and final chance at world honours came on 3 May 1997 at Nynex Arena, Manchester, England, against undefeated WBC super middleweight champion Robin Reid in what was Reid's second defence of the belt. Wharton lost by majority decision with scores of 118–111, 117–113 and 114–114.

== Professional boxing record ==
31 fights	27 wins	3 losses
By knockout	20	0
By decision	7	3
By disqualification	0	0
Draws	1	

No.	Result	Record	Opponent	Type	Round, time	Date	Location	Notes
31	Win	27–3–1	(Ukraine) Kostiantyn Okhrei	TKO	6 (10)	26 Sep 1998	(United Kingdom) Barbican Centre, York, England	
30	Win	26–3–1	(United States) Franklin Edmondson	UD	8	28 Mar 1998	(United States) Boardwalk Convention Center, Atlantic City, New Jersey, U.S.	
29	Loss	25–3–1	(United Kingdom) Robin Reid	MD	12	3 May 1997	(United Kingdom) Nynex Arena, Manchester, England	For WBC super middleweight title
28	Win	25–2–1	(Australia) Rick Thornberry	TKO	5 (12)	23 Oct 1996	(United Kingdom) North Bridge Leisure Centre, Halifax, England	Retained Commonwealth super middleweight title
27	Win	24–2–1	(France) Stephane Nizard	PTS	10	4 Jun 1996	(United Kingdom) Barbican Centre, York, England	
26	Win	23–2–1	(Italy) Vincenzo Nardiello	TKO	6 (12)	13 Jan 1996	(United Kingdom) North Bridge Leisure Centre, Halifax, England	Retained EBU European super middleweight title
25	Win	22–2–1	(United Kingdom) Sam Storey	KO	4 (12)	11 Nov 1995	(United Kingdom) North Bridge Leisure Centre, Halifax, England	Retained Commonwealth & EBU European super middleweight titles
24	Win	21–2–1	(Italy) Mauro Galvano	KO	4 (12)	8 Jul 1995	(United Kingdom) Barbican Centre, York, England	For vacant EBU European super middleweight title
23	Loss	20–2–1	(United Kingdom) Chris Eubank	UD	12	10 Dec 1994	(United Kingdom) G-Mex Centre, Manchester, England	For WBO super middleweight title
22	Win	20–1–1	(Zimbabwe) Sipho Moyo	KO	1 (12)	26 Oct 1994	(United Kingdom) Leeds Town Hall, Leeds, England	Retained Commonwealth super middleweight title
21	Win	19–1–1	(United States) Guy Stanford	RTD	3 (10)	10 Sep 1994	(United Kingdom) National Exhibition Centre, Birmingham, England	
20	Loss	18–1–1	(United Kingdom) Nigel Benn	UD	12	26 Feb 1994	(United Kingdom) Earls Court Exhibition Hall, London, England	For WBC super middleweight title
19	Won	18–0–1	(United States) Ron Amundsen	TKO	8 (8)	7 Oct 1993	(United Kingdom) Barbican Centre, York, England	
18	Won	17–0–1	(United States) Royan Hammond	TKO	3 (8)	1 Jul 1993	(United Kingdom) Barbican Centre, York, England	
17	Win	16–0–1	(United States) Ray Domenge	TKO	3 (8)	7 Apr 1993	(United Kingdom) Leeds Town Hall, Leeds, England	
16	Win	15–0–1	(United Kingdom) Fidel Castro Smith	PTS	12	23 Sep 1992	(United Kingdom) Banqueting Suite, Elland Road, Leeds, England	Retained Commonwealth super middleweight title; Won British super middleweight title
15	Win	14–0–1	(Australia) Rod Carr	TKO	8 (12)	8 Apr 1992	(United Kingdom) Leeds Town Hall, Leeds, England	Retained Commonwealth super middleweight title
14	Win	13–0–1	(United States) Kenny Schaefer	KO	1 (10)	19 Mar 1992	(United Kingdom) Barbican Centre, York, England	
13	Win	12–0–1	(United States) Nicky Walker	PTS	10	23 Jan 1992	(United Kingdom) Barbican Centre, York, England	
12	Draw	11–0–1	(United Kingdom) Lou Gent	Draw	12	30 Oct 1991	(United Kingdom) Leeds Town Hall, Leeds, England	Retained Commonwealth super middleweight title
11	Win	11–0	(Australia) Rod Carr	PTS	12	27 Jun 1991	(United Kingdom) Leeds Town Hall, Leeds, England	Won vacant Commonwealth super middleweight title
10	Win	10–0	(United States) Frank Minton	KO	7 (8)	9 May 1991	(United Kingdom) Leeds Town Hall, Leeds, England	
9	Win	9–0	(Mexico) Francisco Lara	KO	1 (8)	21 Mar 1991	(United Kingdom) Leisure Centre, Dewsbury, England	
8	Win	8–0	(United States) Dino Stewart	PTS	8	31 Oct 1990	(United Kingdom) Wembley Conference Centre, London, England	
7	Win	7–0	(United States) Chuck Edwards	KO	1 (8)	18 Oct 1990	(United Kingdom) Leisure Centre, Dewsbury, England	
6	Win	6–0	(Mexico) Juan Elizondo	TKO	3 (8)	11 Apr 1990	(United Kingdom) Leisure Centre, Dewsbury, England	
5	Win	5–0	(United States) Joe Potts	KO	4 (6)	3 Mar 1990	(United Kingdom) Wembley Arena, London, England	
4	Win	4–0	(Mexico) Guillermo Chavez	KO	1 (8)	11 Jan 1990	(United Kingdom) Leisure Centre, Dewsbury, England	
3	Win	3–0	(United States) Ron Malek	TKO	1 (6)	5 Dec 1989	(United Kingdom) Leisure Centre, Dewsbury, England	
2	Win	2–0	(United Kingdom) Mike Aubrey	PTS	6	25 Oct 1989	(United Kingdom) Wembley Arena, London, England	
1	Win	1–0	(United Kingdom) Dean Murray	TKO	1 (6)	21 Sep 1989	(United Kingdom) Great Yorkshire Showground, Harrogate, England	
