= British and Irish Boxing Authority =

British & Irish Boxing Authority (BIBA)
- Sport: Boxing
- Abbreviation: BIBA
- Founded: 2016
- President: TBA
- Chairman: Al Low
- CEO: Gianluca Di Caro
- Secretary: David Smith

Official website
- www.boxbiba.com
- (United Kingdom)

The British & Irish Boxing Authority (BIBA) is a professional boxing governing, sanctioning, and licensing organization that operates primarily within the United Kingdom and the Republic of Ireland.

== History ==
BIBA was launched in April 2016. In September 2019, it was announced that the authority had sanctioned the comeback fight of Nigel Benn, who will take on Sakio Bika in Birmingham on 23 November 2019.
