= Fidel Castro Smith =

English boxer

Personal information
- Nickname: Slugger O'Toole
- Nationality: British
- Born: 17 April 1963 (age 63) Nottingham, England
- Height: 5 ft 9 in (1.75 m)
- Weight: Middleweight, super middleweight

Boxing career

Boxing record
- Total fights: 30
- Wins: 22
- Win by KO: 13
- Losses: 8
- Draws: 0

Fidel Castro Smith (born 17 April 1963), also known as Slugger O'Toole, is a British former boxer who was British super middleweight champion between 1991 and 1992 and fought for the Commonwealth and European titles.

== Career ==
Born in Nottingham in 1963, Smith was named after Cuban leader Fidel Castro, whom his father admired. Previously a kickboxer, Smith made his professional début in April 1987 initially fighting under the name Slugger O'Toole, and won five of his first six fights before gaining his first title in February 1988 when he stopped Ian Bayliss in the sixth round to take the Central Area middleweight title. In September 1991 he fought Ian Strudwick for the vacant British super middleweight title, stopping Strudwick in the sixth round to become British champion. He successfully defended the title in February 1992 against Lou Gent.

In September 1992 he faced Henry Wharton in Leeds with his British title and the Commonwealth title at stake; Wharton took the titles on points.

Three months later Smith faced Vincenzo Nardiello for the vacant European super middleweight title, and again lost on points.

Returning in August 1993 with a win over Karl Barwise, his next fight was another challenge for the British super middleweight title that had been vacated by Wharton; James Cook took the title on points. After defeat to Sam Storey in May 1994, Smith got another shot at the British title in January 1995, but this time lost to Ali Forbes in what would prove to be Smith's final fight.
