= Thulani Malinga =

South African boxer (born 1955)

Personal information
- Nickname: Sugar Boy
- Nationality: South African
- Born: 11 December 1955 (age 70) Ladysmith, South Africa
- Height: 5 ft 9 1/2 in (177 cm)
- Weight: Middleweight; Super-middleweight; Light-heavyweight

Boxing career
- Stance: Orthodox

Boxing record
- Total fights: 57
- Wins: 44
- Win by KO: 19
- Losses: 13

Thulani Malinga (born 11 December 1955) is a South African former professional boxer who competed from 1981 to 2000, and held the WBC super-middleweight title twice between 1996 and 1998. He holds the record for the oldest boxer to win a world title for the first time.

== Professional career ==
Known as "Sugar Boy", Malinga turned pro in 1981 after compiling an amateur record of 185–10. He began his career with a first-round stoppage of Victor Zulu on 8 August 1981. Malinga held several championship titles during a twenty-year career as a middleweight, super middleweight and light heavyweight, fighting memorable bouts against Nigel Benn, Chris Eubank and Roy Jones Jr., among others.

In 1989 he got his first shot at a title, taking on undefeated IBF super middleweight title holder Graciano Rocchigiani. Malinga lost a decision, and the next year took on Lindell Holmes, again for the IBF super middleweight title. He again lost via decision, and in 1992 got a shot at the WBO super middleweight title against Chris Eubank, during which Malinga was dropped in the fifth round and lost a close decision. Three months later he was also to lose a close decision—by just half a point—against Nigel Benn. After many fights in his native South Africa, and a further KO loss to Roy Jones Jr. in the U.S., he landed another shot at the title in March 1996 against Benn, who was now the WBC super middleweight champion. Despite suffering a knockdown, Malinga scored an upset against Benn to win the title, but ended up losing the title in his first defense against Vincenzo Nardiello. He regained the title in his next fight, a decision win over Robin Reid (who had defeated Nardiello in his first defense of the title). However, he would again lose the belt in his first defense against Richie Woodhall, via decision. He fought four more times, retiring after a suffering an eighth-round TKO against Ole Klemetsen on 14 January 2000, finishing his career with 44 wins (20 by KO) and 13 losses. His trainer was Nick Durandt.

== Professional boxing record ==
57 fights	44 wins	13 losses
By knockout	19	3
By decision	25	9
By disqualification	0	1

No.	Result	Record	Opponent	Type	Round, time	Date	Location	Notes
57	Loss	44–13	Ole Klemetsen	TKO	8 (12), 2:40	14 Jan 2000	Koldinghallerne, Kolding, Denmark	For vacant IBA light-heavyweight title
56	Loss	44–12	Mads Larsen	TKO	10 (12)	19 Mar 1999	Falkoner Center, Copenhagen, Denmark	Lost WBF (Federation) super-middleweight title; For IBO super-middleweight title
55	Win	44–11	Peter H Madsen	RTD	8 (12), 3:00	27 Nov 1998	Vejlby-Risskov Hallen, Aarhus, Denmark	Retained WBF (Federation) super-middleweight title
54	Win	43–11	Fredrik Alvarez	TKO	11 (12)	5 Jun 1998	K.B. Hallen, Copenhagen, Denmark	Won WBF (Federation) super-middleweight title
53	Loss	42–11	Richie Woodhall	UD	12	27 Mar 1998	Ice Rink, Telford, England	Lost WBC super-middleweight title
52	Win	42–10	Robin Reid	UD	12	19 Dec 1997	London Arena, London, England	Won WBC super-middleweight title
51	Loss	41–10	Vincenzo Nardiello	SD	12	6 Jul 1996	NYNEX Arena, Manchester, England	Lost WBC super-middleweight title
50	Win	41–9	Nigel Benn	SD	12	2 Mar 1996	Telewest Arena, Newcastle, England	Won WBC super-middleweight title
49	Win	40–9	Trevor Ambrose	PTS	8	22 Jul 1995	London Arena, London, England	
48	Win	39–9	Soon Botes	TKO	7 (12)	4 Mar 1995	Carousel Casino, Hammanskraal, South Africa	Won South African super-middleweight title
47	Win	38–9	Martin Opperman	TKO	9 (12)	20 Nov 1994	Wembley Indoor Arena, Johannesburg, South Africa	Retained South African light-heavyweight title
46	Win	37–9	Ray Acquaye	TKO	5 (12)	14 Aug 1994	Hotel Casino, Wild Coast, South Africa	Won vacant African super-middleweight title
45	Win	36–9	Mohammed Isaacs	KO	7 (12)	20 Feb 1994	Nasrec Indoor Arena, Johannesburg, South Africa	Retained South African light-heavyweight title
44	Loss	35–9	Roy Jones Jr.	KO	6 (10), 1:57	14 Aug 1993	Casino Magic, Bay St. Louis, Mississippi, US	
43	Win	35–8	Gary Ballard	UD	12	10 Feb 1993	City Hall, Durban, South Africa	Retained South African light-heavyweight title
42	Win	34–8	Jim Murray	MD	12	14 Sep 1992	Nasrec Indoor Arena, Johannesburg, South Africa	Retained South African light-heavyweight title
41	Loss	33–8	Nigel Benn	PTS	10	23 May 1992	National Exhibition Centre, Birmingham, England	
40	Loss	33–7	Chris Eubank	SD	12	1 Feb 1992	National Exhibition Centre, Birmingham, England	For WBO super-middleweight title
39	Win	33–6	Leonard Friedman	UD	10	13 Aug 1991	Morula Sun Casino, Mabopane, South Africa	
38	Loss	32–6	Lindell Holmes	UD	12	15 Dec 1990	Palazzo del Ghiaccio, Marino, Italy	For IBF super-middleweight title
37	Win	32–5	Sakkie Horn	PTS	12	11 Oct 1990	Nasrec Indoor Arena, Johannesburg, South Africa	Won South African light-heavyweight title
36	Loss	31–5	John Jarvis	MD	12	5 Aug 1990	Barranquilla, Colombia	For IBF Inter-Continental super-middleweight title
35	Win	31–4	Tony Harrison	UD	10	29 Jan 1990	FNB Stadium, Johannesburg, South Africa	
34	Win	30–4	Oscar Pena	UD	10	5 Dec 1989	FNB Stadium, Johannesburg, South Africa	
33	Win	29–4	Jose Quinones	TKO	8 (10)	21 Oct 1989	San Juan, Puerto Rico	
32	Win	28–4	Vincent Boulware	MD	10	18 Sep 1989	Portuguese Hall, Johannesburg, South Africa	
31	Win	27–4	Nicky Walker	UD	10	27 May 1989	Superbowl, Sun City, South Africa	
30	Win	26–4	Mike Peak	UD	10	11 Mar 1989	Indoor Centre, Springs, South Africa	
29	Loss	25–4	Graciano Rocchigiani	UD	12	27 Jan 1989	Deutschlandhalle, West Berlin, West Germany	For IBF super-middleweight title
28	Win	25–3	Larry Musgrove	SD	10	18 Jul 1988	West Ridge Park Tennis Stadium, Durban, South Africa	
27	Win	24–3	Jim MacDonald	UD	10	7 Mar 1988	Oppenheimer Stadium, Orkney, South Africa	
26	Win	23–3	Harry Cowap	UD	10	1 Feb 1988	Standard Bank Arena, Johannesburg, South Africa	
25	Loss	22–3	Sakkie Horn	DQ	12 (12)	21 Nov 1987	Indoor Centre, Springs, South Africa	For South African light-heavyweight title; Malinga disqualified for an intentional low blow
24	Win	22–2	Prince Tukane	TKO	4 (10)	18 Oct 1987	City Hall, East London, South Africa	
23	Loss	21–2	Sakkie Horn	SD	12	9 May 1987	Far North Rugby Stadium, Pietersburg, South Africa	Lost South African light-heavyweight title
22	Win	21–1	Freddie Rafferty	UD	12	15 Dec 1986	West Ridge Park Tennis Stadium, Durban, South Africa	Retained South African light-heavyweight title
21	Win	20–1	Sakkie Horn	PTS	12	19 Oct 1986	Portuguese Hall, Johannesburg, South Africa	Won South African light-heavyweight title
20	Win	19–1	Gregory Clark	UD	12	28 Jun 1986	Eldorado Park Stadium, Johannesburg, South Africa	Retained South African middleweight title
19	Win	18–1	Pieter de Bruin	TKO	8 (12)	8 Mar 1986	Crown Mines Showgrounds, Johannesburg, South Africa	Retained South African middleweight title
18	Win	17–1	Kosie van Vuuren	RTD	10 (12)	14 Dec 1985	Currie's Fountain, Durban, South Africa	Retained South African middleweight title
17	Win	16–1	Pieter de Bruin	PTS	6	27 Jul 1985	Superbowl, Sun City, South Africa	
16	Win	15–1	Frankie Decaestecker	RTD	5	22 Jun 1985	Bleskop Stadium, Rustenburg, South Africa	
15	Win	14–1	Robert Madi	TKO	8 (8)	20 Apr 1985	Currie's Fountain, Durban, South Africa	
14	Win	13–1	Gavin Stirrup	KO	2 (10)	15 Mar 1985	Riverlea Hall, Johannesburg, South Africa	
13	Win	12–1	Mwehu Beya	RTD	6 (10)	26 Oct 1984	Riverlea Hall, Johannesburg, South Africa	
12	Win	11–1	Michael Motsoane	UD	12	15 Jun 1984	Riverlea Hall, Johannesburg, South Africa	Retained South African middleweight title
11	Win	10–1	Prince Tukane	PTS	8	1 May 1984	West Ridge Park Tennis Stadium, Durban, South Africa	
10	Win	9–1	John Diamini	KO	4 (10)	27 Feb 1984	City Hall, Pietermaritzburg, South Africa	
9	Win	8–1	Samson Mohloai	UD	12	7 Feb 1983	West Ridge Park Tennis Stadium, Durban, South Africa	Won vacant South African middleweight title
8	Win	7–1	David Kalako	PTS	6	4 Oct 1982	West Ridge Park Tennis Stadium, Durban, South Africa	
7	Win	6–1	Shadrack Sithole	KO	2 (10)	13 Sep 1982	City Hall, Pietermaritzburg, South Africa	Won Natal middleweight title
6	Win	5–1	Graham Mdingi	RTD	2 (6)	28 Aug 1982	Steadeville School Hall, Ladysmith, South Africa	
5	Win	4–1	Morris Mohloai	PTS	6	5 Jun 1982	Limit Hill Tennis Stadium, Ladysmith, South Africa	
4	Loss	3–1	Patrick Tshabalala	PTS	6	17 Apr 1982	Showgrounds, Ermelo, South Africa	
3	Win	3–0	Werdie Jacobs	KO	4 (4)	30 Nov 1981	West Ridge Park Tennis Stadium, Durban, South Africa	
2	Win	2–0	Cyprian Shandu	PTS	4	12 Sep 1981	Seaman's Institute Hall, Durban, South Africa	
1	Win	1–0	Victor Zulu	TKO	1 (4)	8 Aug 1981	Seaman's Institute Hall, Durban, South Africa	Professional debut

Sporting positions
Regional boxing titles
Vacant Title last held by Bruce McIntyre	South African middleweight champion 7 February 1983 – October 1986; Vacated	Vacant Title next held by Gregory Clark
Preceded by Sakkie Horn	South African light-heavyweight champion 19 October 1986 – 9 May 1987	Succeeded by Sakkie Horn
Preceded by Sakkie Horn	South African light-heavyweight champion 11 October 1990 – March 1995; Vacated	Vacant Title next held by Ginger Tshabalala
Inaugural champion	ABU super-middleweight champion 14 August 1994 – November 1994; Vacated	Vacant Title next held by Bertrand Tchandjeu
Preceded by Soon Botes	South African super-middleweight champion 4 March 1995 – March 1996; Vacated	Vacant Title next held by Soon Botes
Minor world boxing titles
Preceded by Fredrik Alvarez	WBF (Federation) super-middleweight champion 5 June 1998 – 19 March 1999	Succeeded by Mads Larsen
Major world boxing titles
Preceded by Nigel Benn	WBC super-middleweight champion 2 March 1996 – 6 July 1996	Succeeded by Vincenzo Nardiello
Preceded by Robin Reid	WBC super-middleweight champion 19 December 1997 – 27 March 1998	Succeeded by Richie Woodhall
Records
Preceded by Fulgencio Obelmejias; Age 36	Oldest super-middleweight world champion Age 40; 2 March 1996 – present	Incumbent
