= Jacques LeBlanc (boxer) =

Canadian boxer

Jacques LeBlanc (born August 5, 1964 in Memramcook, New Brunswick, Canada) is a Canadian retired Middleweight Boxer. LeBlanc is of Acadian ancestry.

== Early career ==
LeBlanc started his boxing career in 1982, Knocking out Tim Parson in 2 rounds. In 1988 LeBlanc (with a 12-2 record) fought and won a fight versus Danny Winters for the Maritimes Middleweight Title. On March 30, 1989 in Moncton, New Brunswick he became Canadian Middleweight Champion, going 12 rounds and eventually winning a fight against Darrell Flint. He kept the crown for 3 and a half months, before losing against Flint in a rematch in July.

== 1990s ==
LeBlanc's next fight was the biggest of his career up to that point; he faced Johnny Gutierrez on January 25, 1991 at the Diplomat Hotel in Hollywood, Florida. The fight ended in a draw. Facing stiffer opposition and trying to make a name for himself, he lost a fight against Miguel Santana in February 1992, but won all five of his other fights in 1991 and 1992.

He boasted a record of 22 wins, 4 losses and 2 draws when he fought WBC Middleweight Champion Roberto Durán on June 29, 1993. LeBlanc was billed as a severe underdog but lasted the full 10 rounds with Duran, losing on points.

LeBlanc fought the undefeated Richie Woodhall in October 1994 for the Commonwealth Middleweight crown but again lost on points. He continued boxing until 1997, but winning again only once.

== 2000s ==
In 2010, Jacques was inducted into the City of Moncton Wall of Fame. He currently holds the record for most matches without being knocked out by an opponent.
