= Nigel Benn =

English boxer (born 1964)

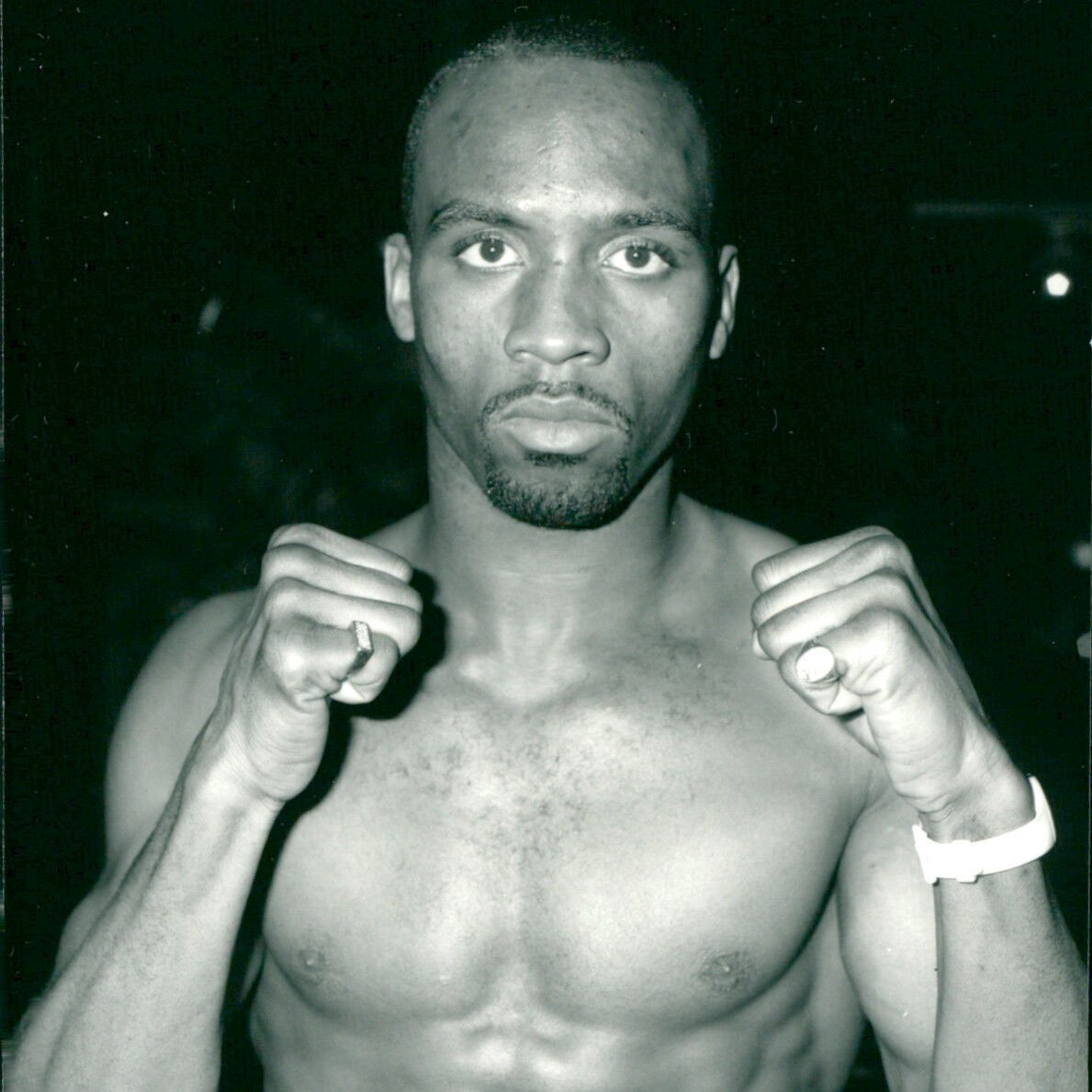

Personal information
- Nickname: The Dark Destroyer
- Born: Nigel Gregory Benn; 22 January 1964 (age 62) Ilford, Greater London, England
- Height: 5 ft 9 1/2 in (177 cm)
- Weight: Middleweight; Super-middleweight

Boxing career
- Reach: 73 in (185 cm)
- Stance: Orthodox

Boxing record
- Total fights: 48
- Wins: 42
- Win by KO: 35
- Losses: 5
- Draws: 1

Nigel Gregory Benn (born 22 January 1964) is a British former professional boxer who competed from 1987 to 1996. He is a world champion in two weight classes, having held the World Boxing Organization (WBO) middleweight title in 1990, and the World Boxing Council (WBC) super-middleweight title from 1992 to 1996. At regional level, he held the Commonwealth middleweight title from 1988 to 1989. As an amateur, he won the ABA middleweight title in 1986.

Benn's knockout-to-win percentage stood at 83.3%. Benn was inducted into the International Boxing Hall of Fame as part of the class of 2026.

== Early life ==
Benn was born in Ilford, Essex (now East London), on 22 January 1964. His parents moved from Barbados to the United Kingdom in the 1950s. At the age of 18, Benn joined the Royal Regiment of Fusiliers and was stationed in West Germany for three years. He was later stationed in Northern Ireland for an additional eighteen months.

== Amateur career ==
After leaving the army, Benn joined the West Ham Amateur Boxing Club. He became the Amateur Boxing Association Middleweight Champion in 1986.

== Professional career ==
=== Commonwealth champion ===
Benn began his professional boxing career in 1987, achieving 16 consecutive knockout victories within the first year. On 20 April 1988, he won the vacant Commonwealth middleweight title by defeating Abdul Umaru via a second-round stoppage at Alexandra Pavilion, improving to 17–0 with 17 knockouts.

==== Benn vs. Watson ====
Over the next year, Benn had increased his undefeated streak to 22–0, with 22 knockouts, before facing Michael Watson in May 1989 in defence of his Commonwealth title. The bout was nationally televised and took place at Finsbury Park, London. In the sixth round, Benn was counted out after Watson knocked him down with a jab, thus losing his title and ending both his undefeated record and his perfect knockout streak.

Benn's next fight, against Jorge Amparo in Atlantic City, U.S., marked his first fight outside the UK, and the first to go the full distance. He won by a 10-round decision.

=== WBO middleweight champion ===
After securing victories against Sanderline Williams and Jose Quinones, Benn faced WBO middleweight champion Doug DeWitt in Atlantic City. After being knocked down in the second round, Benn recovered, flooring DeWitt in the third round, and delivering three knockdowns in the eighth to claim the title.

==== Benn vs. Barkley ====
His first defence was in August 1990 against former WBC champion Iran Barkley. Benn won by virtue of the three-knockdown rule at the end of the first round.

==== Benn vs. Eubank ====
Only three months later, Benn would return to the UK to make his second defence, this time against unbeaten British rival Chris Eubank (24–0). The build-up to the fight was noted for the intense acrimony between the two; in contrast to Eubank, who insisted that he did not hate Benn despite denigrating him and his abilities, Benn declared that he genuinely hated Eubank and intended to beat him severely. In a fiercely competitive bout held at Birmingham on 18 November 1990, Benn lost his title to Eubank by ninth-round technical knockout. Despite dropping Eubank in the eighth round, Eubank came back in the next round with a relentless flurry that left Benn staggered and largely defenseless against the ropes, forcing referee Richard Steele to step in. This was the second loss of Benn's career.

=== WBC super-middleweight champion ===
Following his loss to Eubank, Benn returned in 1991 with a seventh-round KO victory over Robbie Sims (Marvin Hagler's half-brother). In July of that year, Benn made his super-middleweight debut with a fourth-round TKO over Kid Milo. After defeating two more journeyman fighters that year, he began 1992 with a one-punch KO victory against Dan Sherry. He followed this up with a unanimous decision win over the formidable Thulani Malinga, a future world champion whom Benn would face again years later.

Now on a six-fight winning streak, including five at super middleweight, Benn earned another shot at a world title. On 10 October 1992, Benn successfully challenged Mauro Galvano for the WBC super-middleweight title in Palaghiaccio di Marino, Marino, Lazio, Italy. Due to a severe cut, Galvano could not continue after the third round, awarding Benn the title.

==== Benn vs. Eubank II ====
Benn's move to the higher weight class led him to refine his fight strategy and adopt a more measured approach. He successfully defended his title three times, defeating fellow Britons Nicky Piper and Lou Gent, followed by a rematch with Galvano that Benn won by unanimous decision. He then faced Chris Eubank, now WBO super-middleweight champion, in a unification bout on 9 October 1993. The bout ended in a draw, with both fighters retaining their respective titles. Benn defended his title twice in 1994 with unanimous decisions against Henry Wharton and Juan Carlos Giminez Ferreyra.

==== Benn vs. McClellan ====
In February 1995, Benn successfully defended his super-middleweight title against former WBC middleweight champion Gerald McClellan in a highly anticipated bout billed as Sudden Impact. Going into the fight, McClellan had won his last 21 fights, the last 14 by knockout with 13 of those knockouts in the first three rounds. Due to this record, many British media saw Benn as an underdog.

In round one, Benn was knocked through the ropes as McClellan dominated early. Benn struggled in the early rounds, with McClellan in clear control. From rounds four to six, Benn began to shift the momentum, and McClellan showed signs of distress, repeatedly losing his gum shield, backing off for extended periods, and blinking continuously. During the fight, the referee warned Benn about punches to the back of the head during clinches, a type of punch known to cause brain damage. McClellan responded in rounds seven and eight, knocking Benn down again in the latter. However, McClellan, now visibly fatigued, was unable to capitalise on his advantage. Benn won the fight by stoppage in the tenth round via knockout, as McClellan could not rise from his knees. At the time of the stoppage, two judges had McClellan ahead, while the third scored the fight as even, although these scores did not account for the two knockdowns Benn delivered in the final round.

McClellan sustained serious injuries as a result of the fight. After collapsing in his corner post-fight, McClellan was rushed to the hospital, where doctors found a blood clot in his brain. McClellan fell into a coma for two weeks. The injuries left him with significant impairments: he suffers from short-term memory problems, is almost blind, partially deaf, and uses a wheelchair. However, since 1995, McClellan has regained some of his hearing, having been 80% deaf, and can now walk with a cane. In 2007, McClellan, his sister, and his children attended a benefit dinner organised and hosted by Benn to help McClellan with his ongoing medical expenses.

After his fight with McClellan, Benn had two further successful title defences, with wins against future WBC title-holder Vincenzo Nardiello and American Danny Perez. Benn then faced Thulani Malinga in a 1996 rematch. Benn managed to knock Malinga down in the fifth round, but he would go on to meet the canvas himself in the twelfth round. Benn lost the contest by a split decision (118–109, 115–111, 112–114), thus ending his title reign.

==== Benn vs. Collins ====
In 1996, Benn attempted to take the WBO super-middleweight title twice from Steve Collins, who had taken that particular title from Eubank. Benn failed in both attempts. In the first fight, he lost by TKO in round four after sustaining an ankle injury.

==== Benn vs. Collins II ====
In the rematch four months later, Benn was retired by his corner at the end of round six with Benn on his stool. He retired from professional boxing altogether shortly after the second fight.

=== Return from retirement ===
On 24 September 2019, Benn announced his intention to return to boxing at 55, after a 23-year absence from the ring. Benn explained that he wanted "closure" after the unsatisfactory end to his boxing career in 1996. He revealed plans for a bout against former WBC super-middleweight world champion Sakio Bika (34–7–3), scheduled for 23 November 2019. The British Boxing Board of Control refused to sanction the fight, leading to its controversial sanctioning by the British and Irish Boxing Authority instead. However, the fight was subsequently called off after Benn suffered a shoulder injury in sparring. Benn confirmed that he was abandoning his planned comeback.

== Life after boxing ==
In 1999, Benn attempted suicide, citing struggles with sex addiction and its impact on his family. He survived partly because the hosepipe he used to recycle exhaust fumes into his car disconnected repeatedly. Benn regards this incident as a turning point, after which he embraced Christianity and committed to remaining faithful to his wife.

In 2002, Benn participated in the first series of I'm a Celebrity...Get Me Out of Here! He was eliminated second on 3 September 2002, placing 7th.

Benn works with at-risk youth in Blacktown, New South Wales, Australia, and is dedicated to his charity work. He is an ambassador to the New South Wales Police Citizens Youth Club (PCYC) and an advocate for healthy living. Benn is also a Patron of the Shannon Bradshaw Trust, a UK children's charity based in the North West of England, helping children with life-threatening conditions and their families.

Benn was inducted into the World Boxing Council (WBC) Boxing Hall of Fame in 2013 and is honoured alongside fellow Brit Joe Calzaghe, both WBC middleweight champions. His image is now on the sixth-generation WBC super middleweight belt.

Benn ran the 2013 City to Surf to raise funds for the most underfunded PCYC gym in Redfern, Sydney and has undertaken many fundraisers for the charity since improving the boxing facilities in the most impoverished areas of Sydney. Benn regularly assists Christian groups, counseling individuals with addiction, and along with his wife, Carolyne, counsels couples facing marital issues.

One of Benn's sons, Conor Benn, turned professional in 2016 and is currently fighting at welterweight. Another son, Harley, turned professional in 2017.

In 2024, Benn joined fellow London boxers Frank Bruno, Lennox Lewis and Chris Eubank for an Amazon Prime Video mini-documentary, Four Kings. In the final episode, he revealed he had been diagnosed with bipolar disorder. He also stated that he was aware of unresolved PTSD due to the circumstances surrounding his older brother's death.

== Professional boxing record ==
48 fights	42 wins	5 losses
By knockout	35	4
By decision	7	1
Draws	1	

No.	Result	Record	Opponent	Type	Round, time	Date	Location	Notes
48	Loss	42–5–1	Steve Collins	RTD	6 (12), 3:00	9 Nov 1996	NYNEX Arena, Manchester, England	For WBO super-middleweight title
47	Loss	42–4–1	Steve Collins	TKO	4 (12), 2:44	6 Jul 1996	NYNEX Arena, Manchester, England	For WBO super-middleweight title
46	Loss	42–3–1	Thulani Malinga	SD	12	2 Mar 1996	Telewest Arena, Newcastle, England	Lost WBC super-middleweight title
45	Win	42–2–1	Danny Perez	TKO	7 (12), 2:33	2 Sep 1995	Wembley Stadium, London, England	Retained WBC super-middleweight title
44	Win	41–2–1	Vincenzo Nardiello	TKO	8 (12), 1:43	22 Jul 1995	London Arena, London, England	Retained WBC super-middleweight title
43	Win	40–2–1	Gerald McClellan	KO	10 (12), 1:46	25 Feb 1995	London Arena, London, England	Retained WBC super-middleweight title
42	Win	39–2–1	Juan Carlos Giménez Ferreyra	UD	12	10 Sep 1994	National Exhibition Centre, Birmingham, England	Retained WBC super-middleweight title
41	Win	38–2–1	Henry Wharton	UD	12	26 Feb 1994	Earls Court Exhibition Centre, London, England	Retained WBC super-middleweight title
40	Draw	37–2–1	Chris Eubank	SD	12	9 Oct 1993	Old Trafford, Manchester, England	Retained WBC super-middleweight title; For WBO super-middleweight title
39	Win	37–2	Lou Gent	TKO	4 (12), 0:35	26 Jun 1993	Earls Court Exhibition Centre, London, England	Retained WBC super-middleweight title
38	Win	36–2	Mauro Galvano	UD	12	6 Mar 1993	Exhibition and Conference Centre, Glasgow, Scotland	Retained WBC super-middleweight title
37	Win	35–2	Nicky Piper	TKO	11 (12), 1:44	12 Dec 1992	Alexandra Pavilion, London, England	Retained WBC super-middleweight title
36	Win	34–2	Mauro Galvano	TKO	4 (12)	3 Oct 1992	Palaghiaccio, Marino, Italy	Won WBC super-middleweight title
35	Win	33–2	Thulani Malinga	SD	10	23 May 1992	National Exhibition Centre, Birmingham, England	
34	Win	32–2	Dan Sherry	KO	3 (10), 2:34	19 Feb 1992	Alexandra Pavilion, London, England	
33	Win	31–2	Hector Abel Lescano	KO	3 (10), 2:35	7 Dec 1991	G-Mex Centre, Manchester, England	
32	Win	30–2	Lenzie Morgan	UD	10	26 Oct 1991	Leisure Centre, Brentwood, England	
31	Win	29–2	Kid Milo	TKO	4 (10)	3 Jul 1991	International Centre, Brentwood, England	
30	Win	28–2	Robbie Sims	TKO	7 (10)	3 Apr 1991	York Hall, London, England	
29	Loss	27–2	Chris Eubank	TKO	9 (12), 2:56	18 Nov 1990	National Exhibition Centre, Birmingham, England	Lost WBO middleweight title
28	Win	27–1	Iran Barkley	TKO	1 (12), 2:57	18 Aug 1990	Bally's Las Vegas, Paradise, Nevada, US	Retained WBO middleweight title
27	Win	26–1	Doug DeWitt	TKO	8 (12), 0:44	29 Apr 1990	Caesar's, Atlantic City, New Jersey, US	Won WBO middleweight title
26	Win	25–1	Sanderline Williams	SD	10	14 Jan 1990	Caesar's, Atlantic City, New Jersey, US	
25	Win	24–1	Jose Quinones	TKO	1 (10), 2:51	1 Dec 1989	Hacienda Resort Hotel and Casino, Paradise, Nevada, US	
24	Win	23–1	Jorge Amparo	UD	10	20 Oct 1989	Steel Pier, Atlantic City, New Jersey, US	
23	Loss	22–1	Michael Watson	TKO	6 (12), 1:34	21 May 1989	Majestic Ballroom, London, England	Lost Commonwealth middleweight title
22	Win	22–0	Mbayo Wa Mbayo	KO	2 (10), 2:20	28 Mar 1989	Kelvin Hall, Glasgow, Scotland	
21	Win	21–0	Michael Chilambe	KO	1 (12), 1:07	8 Feb 1989	Royal Albert Hall, London, England	Retained Commonwealth middleweight title
20	Win	20–0	David Noel	TKO	1 (12), 2:04	10 Dec 1988	Crystal Palace National Sports Centre, London, England	Retained Commonwealth middleweight title
19	Win	19–0	Anthony Logan	KO	2 (12), 1:15	26 Oct 1988	Royal Albert Hall, London, England	Retained Commonwealth middleweight title
18	Win	18–0	Tim Williams	TKO	2 (10), 0:59	28 May 1988	Royal Albert Hall, London, England	
17	Win	17–0	Abdul Umaru Sanda	TKO	2 (12)	20 Apr 1988	Alexandra Pavilion, London, England	Won vacant Commonwealth middleweight title
16	Win	16–0	Darren Hobson	KO	1 (8), 1:49	13 Apr 1988	Norwich Lads Boxing Club, Norwich, England	
15	Win	15–0	Greg Taylor	TKO	2 (8)	24 Feb 1988	Afan Lido F.C., Port Talbot, Wales	
14	Win	14–0	Byron Prince	TKO	2 (8)	7 Feb 1988	Bingley Hall, Stafford, England	
13	Win	13–0	Fermin Chirino	KO	2 (8)	27 Jan 1988	York Hall, London, England	
12	Win	12–0	Reggie Miller	TKO	7 (10), 1:08	2 Dec 1987	Wembley Conference Centre, London, England	
11	Win	11–0	Ian Chantler	KO	1 (8), 0:16	24 Nov 1987	The Hudson, Wisbech, England	
10	Win	10–0	Ronnie Yoe	TKO	1 (8)	3 Nov 1987	Crowtree Leisure Centre, Sunderland, England	
9	Win	9–0	Russell Barker	TKO	1 (6), 1:15	13 Oct 1987	Blazers Nightclub, Windsor, England	
8	Win	8–0	Winston Burnett	KO	3 (6), 1:55	16 Sep 1987	Royal Albert Hall, London, England	
7	Win	7–0	Eddie Smith	KO	2 (8), 1:08	8 Sep 1987	Blazers Nightclub, Windsor, England	
6	Win	6–0	Leon Morris	KO	1 (6), 0:25	1 Jul 1987	Royal Albert Hall, London, England	
5	Win	5–0	Reginald Marks	TKO	1 (6)	7 Jun 1987	Royal Albert Hall, London, England	
4	Win	4–0	Winston Burnett	TKO	4 (8)	9 May 1987	Latchmere Leisure Centre, London, England	
3	Win	3–0	Rob Nieuwenhuizen	TKO	1 (6), 2:03	22 Apr 1987	Royal Albert Hall, London, England	
2	Win	2–0	Kevin Roper	TKO	1 (6)	4 Mar 1987	Festival Hall Super Tent, Basildon, England	
1	Win	1–0	Graeme Ahmed	TKO	2 (8), 1:10	28 Jan 1987	Fairfield Halls, London, England	

== Titles in boxing ==
=== Major world titles ===
- WBO middleweight champion (160 lbs)
- WBC super-middleweight champion (168 lbs)

=== Regional/International titles ===
- Commonwealth middleweight champion (160 lbs)

Sporting positions
Amateur boxing titles
Previous: Denys Cronin	ABA middleweight champion 1986	Next: Rod Douglas
Regional boxing titles
Vacant Title last held by Tony Sibson	Commonwealth middleweight champion 20 April 1988 – 21 June 1989	Succeeded by Michael Watson
World boxing titles
Preceded by Doug DeWitt	WBO middleweight champion 29 April 1990 – 18 Nov 1990	Succeeded by Chris Eubank
Preceded by Mauro Galvano	WBC super-middleweight champion 3 October 1992 – 2 March 1996	Succeeded by Thulani Malinga
