= Vincenzo Nardiello =

Italian boxer

Personal information
- Nationality: Italian
- Born: 11 June 1966 (age 60) Stuttgart, West Germany
- Height: 5 ft 10 1/2 in (179 cm)
- Weight: Super middleweight

Boxing career
- Reach: 73 in (185 cm)
- Stance: Southpaw

Boxing record
- Total fights: 41
- Wins: 34
- Win by KO: 19
- Losses: 7

Vincenzo Nardiello (born 11 June 1966) is an Italian former WBC super middleweight world champion that has retired from boxing.

== Early life and amateur career ==
Nardiello was born in Stuttgart, Baden-Württemberg, West Germany. A former world champion in the super middleweight division, he and Roy Jones Jr. are best remembered as the two boxers who were controversially robbed of decisions against eventual Olympic light middleweight gold medalist Park Si-Hun in the last two rounds of the 1988 Olympics despite Nardiello and Jones clearly landing more punches in their bouts. Two of the judges in Jones versus Si-Hun finals were banned for life after the tournament, while the third admitted his card was a mistake, with Jones being named the outstanding fighter of the tournament. Si-Hun apologized and retired. The stain of the 'bad decisions' in the 1988 Olympics stayed with Nardiello and Jones for the rest of their careers. 36 of 37 Americans got decisions in boxing in the 1984 Olympics in the United States, and the South Koreans had vowed to get back at the American media for being terribly wronged in 1984, and Nardiello and Jones were targets of the South Korean scorecards of the time. Nardiello, who lost a 3–2 split decision Park Si-Hun, felt he had been cheated, argued with the officials at ringside and had to be physically dragged from the Seoul Olympics ring area.

=== Amateur achievements ===
- 1984 Italian superlightweight champion
- 1985 Silver Trofeo Italy
  - Lost Jose Luis Hernandez (Kuba) WO
- 1986 Italian superwelterweight champion
- 1986 Winner Trofeo Italy
  - Defeated Kalin Stoyanov (Bulgaria) KO 2
- 1987 Italian middleweight champion
- Represented Italy as a Light Middleweight, at the 1988 Seoul Olympic Games. Results were:
  - 1st round bye
  - Defeated Likou Aliu (Samoa) KO 3
  - Defeated Quinton Paynter (Bermuda) KO 2
  - Lost to Park Si-Hun (South Korea) 2–3
- 1988 Winner Trofeo Italia – Venice, Italy
  - Defeated Renato Mastria (Italy) 5–0
- 1989 Silver Box-Am Tournament – Huelva, Spain
  - Defeated Javier Martinez (Espania) KO 3
  - Lost to Theuer Marco (Germany) 0–5
- 1990 Winner Trofeo Italia – Venice, Italy
  - Defeated Miodrag Radulovic (Yugoslawia) 4–1
  - Defeated Theuer Marco (Germany) 3–2

== Professional career ==
Nardiello turned pro after the 1988 Olympics and won seventeen consecutive bouts. On 13 December 1991, Nardiello was stopped in the 11th round of his first world title bout by WBA Super Middleweight champion Victor Corboba in France. He then won and lost, regained and lost again the European Super Middleweight title in bouts in Italy and France. After knocking Massimiliano Bocchini in Italy, Nardiello again challenged for a world title, but was stopped in the eighth round of a London bout against WBC Super Middleweight champion Nigel Benn, in Benn's first bout since his bout with Gerald McClellan who sustained critical injuries. Benn then lost his title to Thulani Malinga, lost his last three title bouts and retired in 1996. Nardiello qualified for another world title shot by knocking out Norberto Bueno in Italy. On 6 July 1996, in Manchester, England, Nardiello defeated WBC champion Thulani Malinga to win a share of the World Super Middleweight title in his third attempt. Nardiello lost the WBC title in Milan, Italy, later in 1996, when he was stopped by Robin Reid After winning three more bouts, Nardiello was unsuccessful in his final world title bout, getting stopped in the sixth round of a WBC World Super Middleweight title bout against Richie Woodhall (who had lost the 'other' 1988 Olympics semi-final bout to Jones) on 13 February 1999. Nardiello retired after winning a six-round decision over Glenn Odem in Italy on 29 May 1999.

== Professional boxing record ==
41 fights	34 wins	7 losses
By knockout	19	7
By decision	15	0

No.	Result	Record	Opponent	Type	Round, time	Date	Location	Notes
41	Win	34–7	(United States) Glenn Odem	PTS	6	1999–05–29	Bari, Puglia, Italy	
40	Loss	33–7	(United Kingdom) Richie Woodhall	TKO	6 (12) 1:44	1999–02–13	(United Kingdom) Telewest Arena, Newcastle upon Tyne, England, U.K.	For WBC Super middleweight title.
39	Win	33–6	(Bulgaria) Stanimir Todorov	TKO	1 (?)	1997–10–04	Vibo Valentia, Calabria, Italy	
38	Win	32–6	(Mexico) Nino Cirilo	PTS	6	1997–09–17	Fiumicino, Lazio, Italy	
37	Win	31–6	(United States) Tim Bryan	KO	2 (?)	1997–05–10	Palasport, Roma, Lazio, Italy	
36	Loss	30–6	(United Kingdom) Robin Reid	TKO	7 (12) 2:59	1996–10–12	Forum, Assago, Milano, Lombardia, Italy	Lost WBC Super middleweight title.
35	Win	30–5	(South Africa) Thulani Malinga	SD	12	1996–07–06	(United Kingdom) NYNEX Arena, Manchester, England, U.K.	Won WBC Super middleweight title.
34	Win	29–5	(Mexico) Norberto Bueno	KO	1 (?)	1996–03–09	PalaLido, Milan, Lombardia, Italy	
33	Loss	28–5	(United Kingdom) Henry Wharton	TKO	6 (12) 0:52	1996–01–13	(United Kingdom) North Bridge Leisure Centre, Halifax, England, U.K.	For EBU Super middleweight title.
32	Win	28–4	(Mexico) Rolando Torres	KO	4 (?)	1995–12–16	Voghera, Lombardia, Italy	
31	Win	27–4	(Spain) José Bayón Vargas	KO	3 (8)	1995–10–14	Olympiahalle, Munich, Bayern, Germany	
30	Loss	26–4	(United Kingdom) Nigel Benn	TKO	8 (12) 1:43	1995–07–22	(United Kingdom) London Arena, Millwall, England, U.K.	For WBC Super middleweight title.
29	Win	26–3	(Italy) Massimiliano Bocchini	TKO	3 (?)	1994–10–26	Spotorno, Liguria, Italy	
28	Loss	25–3	(France) Frederic Seillier	TKO	5 (12)	1994–06–11	Le Zénith, Toulon, Var, France	Lost EBU Super middleweight title.
27	Win	25–2	(Italy) Mauro Galvano	PTS	12	1993–11–26	Palazzo del Ghiaccio, Marino, Italy	Won vacant EBU Super middleweight title.
26	Win	24–2	(United States) Bruce Starling	TKO	2 (?)	1993–07–16	CSKA, Moscow, Russia	
25	Win	23–2	(Uruguay) Juan Alberto Barrero	PTS	8	1993–05–28	San Mango d'Aquino, Calabria, Italy	
24	Loss	22–2	(United Kingdom) Ray Close	TKO	10 (12)	1993–03–17	Campione d'Italia, Lombardia, Italy	Lost EBU Super middleweight title.
23	Win	22–1	(United Kingdom) Fidel Castro Smith	PTS	12	1992–12–16	Ariccia, Lazio, Italy	Won vacant EBU Super middleweight title.
22	Win	21–1	(United States) Mike Peoples	PTS	8	1992–10–03	Palazzo del Ghiaccio, Marino, Lazio, Italy	
21	Win	20–1	(United States) Kenny Snow	PTS	6	1992–07–22	Palazzo Dello Sport, Capo d'Orlando, Italy	
20	Win	19–1	(Paraguay) Eladio Centurión	KO	1 (8)	1992–06–25	Acquaflash di Licola, Campania, Italy	
19	Win	18–1	(United States) Troy Watson	PTS	8	1992–03–12	Cirque d'hiver, Paris, France	
18	Loss	17–1	(Panama) Víctor Córdoba	TKO	11 (12) 1:44	1991–12–13	Palais Omnisport de Paris-Bercy, Paris, France	For WBA Super middleweight title.
17	Win	17–0	(United Kingdom) Tony Burke	KO	2 (6)	1991–10–12	Stade Louis II, Fontvieille, Monaco	
16	Win	16–0	(Argentina) Edmundo Diaz	TKO	4 (8)	1991–07–20	Stadio delle Palme, Palermo, Italy	
15	Win	15–0	(Argentina) Miguel Antonio Mosna	PTS	8	1991–06–08	La Spezia, Liguria, Italy	
14	Win	14–0	(Argentina) Miguel Angel Maldonado	PTS	8	1991–03–23	Vallecrosia, Liguria, Italy	
13	Win	13–0	(Argentina) Jorge Alberto Morello	PTS	10	1991–01–26	Arena, Sassari, Sardegna, Italy	
12	Win	12–0	(Argentina) Daniel Ochoa	KO	3 (10)	1990–11–16	Piove di Sacco, Veneto, Italy	
11	Win	11–0	(United States) Ismael Gonzalez	TKO	5 (?)	1990–10–15	Milan, Lombardy, Italy	
10	Win	10–0	(Belgium) Gaston Cool	TKO	4 (?)	1990–06–02	Salice Terme, Lombardia, Italy	
9	Win	9–0	(France) Jean-Paul Roux	TKO	2 (?)	1990–05–12	Arena, Sassari, Sardegna, Italy	
8	Win	8–0	(France) Akim Zeroual	TKO	1 (8)	1990–03–13	Milan, Lombardy, Italy	
7	Win	7–0	(Ghana) Franky Moro	TKO	6 (8)	1990–01–29	Milan, Lombardy, Italy	
6	Win	6–0	(Mexico) Juan Graciano	KO	1 (?)	1989–07–15	Vigevano, Lombardy, Italy	
5	Win	5–0	(Dominican Republic) Pedro Durán	KO	1 (?)	1989–06–08	Ostia, Lazio, Italy	
4	Win	4–0	(United States) Sylvan Plowright	TKO	1 (?)	1989–05–06	Stadio Nicola De Simone, Syracuse, Sicily, Italy	
3	Win	3–0	(Belgium) Bechir Chaarane	PTS	6	1989–03–10	Bergamo, Lombardy, Italy	
2	Win	2–0	(Belgium) Jimmy Gourad	PTS	6	1989–01–28	Milan, Lombardy, Italy	
1	Win	1–0	(Belgium) Philip Houthoofdt	PTS	6	1988–12–22	Milan, Lombardy, Italy	

== Personal life ==
Nardiello was sentenced to three years and four months in prison for extortion and two years and six months for making violent threats.

== See also ==
- List of world super-middleweight boxing champions

Sporting positions
Regional boxing titles
Vacant Title last held by Frank Nicotra	EBU super middleweight champion 16 December 1992 – 17 March 1993	Succeeded by Ray Close
Vacant Title last held by Ray Close	EBU super middleweight champion 26 November 1993 – 11 June 1994	Succeeded by Frederic Seillier
World boxing titles
Preceded by Thulani Malinga	WBC super middleweight champion 6 July 1996 – 12 October 1996	Succeeded by Robin Reid
