= Robbie Sims =

American boxer

Personal information
- Born: November 5, 1959 (age 66) Newark, New Jersey, U.S.
- Weight: Middleweight

Boxing career
- Stance: Southpaw

Boxing record
- Total fights: 50
- Wins: 38
- Win by KO: 26
- Losses: 10
- Draws: 2
- No contests: 0

Robbie Sims (born November 5, 1959) is an American former professional boxer who competed from 1980 to 1996. He is the half-brother of former world middleweight champion Marvelous Marvin Hagler.

== Professional career ==
He KOd an inexperienced Iran Barkley, outpointed Doug DeWitt and rose to prominence as a middleweight contender by a very polemical defeating Roberto Durán in 1986. Sims lost to Sumbu Kalambay in a shot for the WBA title in 1988. All his losses were on points except a knockout in the 7th round against Nigel Benn.

Sims was trained by famous Brockton based trainers Pat and Goody Petronelli. He had a career record of 38-10-2 with 26 knockouts.

== Professional boxing record ==
38 Wins (26 knockouts, 12 decisions), 10 Losses (1 knockout, 9 decisions), 2 Draws Archived February 26, 2015, at the Wayback Machine
Result	Record	Opponent	Type	Round	Date	Location	Notes
Win	38-10-2	(United States) Jose Burgos	PTS	8	20/09/1996	(United States) Bayside Expo Center, Boston, Massachusetts, U.S.	
Loss	37-10-2	(United States) Vinny Pazienza	UD	10	26/10/1993	(United States) Mashantucket, Connecticut, U.S.	
Win	37-9-2	(United States) Willis Ely	KO	3	04/16/1993	(United States) Boston, Massachusetts, U.S.	
Win	36-9-2	(United States) Keheven Johnson	TKO	3	02/26/1993	(United States) Woodbridge, Virginia, U.S.	
Win	35-9-2	(United States) Jerry Strickland	KO	1	06/26/1992	(United States) Randolph, Massachusetts, U.S.	
Win	34-9-2	(United States) Dennis Johnson	KO	4	02/04/1992	(United States) Randolph, Massachusetts, U.S.	
Win	33-9-2	(United States) Robert Curry	PTS	10	022/22/1992	(United States) Randolph, Massachusetts, U.S.	
Loss	32-9-2	(United Kingdom) Nigel Benn	KO	7	03/04/1991	(United Kingdom) London, England	
Win	32-8-2	(United States) Ralph Moncrief	UD	10	11/24/1990	(United States) Boston, Massachusetts, U.S.	
Loss	31-8-2	(United States) Ron Essett	MD	10	06/26/1990	(United States) Tampa, Florida, U.S.	
Win	31-7-2	(United States) Kenny Butler	DQ	5	04/13/1990	(United States) Taunton, Massachusetts, U.S.	
Win	30-7-2	(United States) Victor King	TKO	9	12/30/1989	(United States) Boston, Massachusetts, U.S.	
Loss	29-7-2	(United States) Dennis Milton	UD	10	12/09/1989	(United States) Atlantic City, New Jersey, U.S.	
Loss	29-6-2	(United States) Doug DeWitt	SD	12	04/18/1989	(United States) Atlantic City, New Jersey, U.S.	WBO Middleweight Title.
Loss	29-5-2	(Italy) Sumbu Kalambay	UD	12	12/06/1988	Ravenna, Italy	WBA Middleweight Title.
Win	29-4-2	(United States) Ralph Smiley	TKO	9	03/18/1988	(United States) Boston, Massachusetts, U.S.	Referee stopped the bout at 1:40 of the ninth round.
Win	28-4-2	(United States) Lee Sanders	TKO	5	10/04/1987	(United States) Las Vegas, Nevada, U.S.	Referee stopped the bout at 1:53 of the fifth round.
Draw	27-4-2	(United States) Tim Williams	PTS	10	12/02/1987	(United States) Las Vegas, Nevada, U.S.	
Win	27-4-1	(Panama) Roberto Durán	SD	10	23/06/1986	(United States) Las Vegas, Nevada, U.S.	
Win	26-4-1	(United States) John Collins	TKO	1	09/03/1986	(United States) Las Vegas, Nevada, U.S.	IBF USBA Middleweight Title. Referee stopped the bout at 2:46 of the first round.
Win	25-4-1	(United States) Mario Tineo	TKO	4	06/12/1985	(United States) Las Vegas, Nevada, U.S.	
Win	24-4-1	(United States) Doug DeWitt	UD	10	30/08/1985	(United States) Atlantic City, New Jersey, U.S.	
Win	23-4-1	(United States) Stacy McSwain	KO	4	30/05/1985	(United States) Portland, Maine, U.S.	
Loss	22-4-1	(United States) Mike Tinley	UD	10	01/11/1984	(United States) Atlantic City, New Jersey, U.S.	
Win	22-3-1	(United States) Mike Baker	TKO	5	26/07/1984	(United States) Miami Beach, Florida, U.S.	Referee stopped the bout at 2:30 of the fifth round.
Win	21-3-1	(United States) Danny Long	SD	12	10/05/1984	(United States) Brockton, Massachusetts, U.S.	
Win	20-3-1	(United States) Curtis Ramsey	UD	10	29/03/1984	(United States) Las Vegas, Nevada, U.S.	
Win	19-3-1	(United States) Iran Barkley	KO	6	06/01/1984	(United States) Atlantic City, New Jersey, U.S.	
Win	18-3-1	(United States) Charlie Hecker	KO	2	25/10/1983	(United States) Portland, Maine, U.S.	
Win	17-3-1	(United States) Teddy Mann	SD	10	01/09/1983	(United States) Atlantic City, New Jersey, U.S.	
Loss	16-3-1	(United States) Mike Tinley	SD	10	03/08/1983	(United States) Atlantic City, New Jersey, U.S.	
Win	16-2-1	(United States) Tony Chiaverini	KO	5	23/03/1983	(United States) Worcester, Massachusetts, U.S.	
Draw	15-2-1	(United Kingdom) Murray Sutherland	PTS	10	04/02/1983	(United States) Worcester, Massachusetts, U.S.	
Loss	15-2	(United States) Clinton Jackson	PTS	10	16/10/1982	(United States) Atlantic City, New Jersey, U.S.	
Win	15-1	(United States) Bruce Thompson	KO	1	20/08/1982	(United States) Plymouth, Massachusetts, U.S.	
Win	14-1	(United States) Jose Green	KO	4	10/07/1982	(United States) McAfee, New Jersey, U.S.	
Win	13-1	(United States) Fred Reed	TKO	5	30/04/1982	(United States) South Yarmouth, Massachusetts, U.S.	Referee stopped the bout at 1:48 of the fifth round.
Loss	12-1	(United States) Bobby Czyz	UD	10	17/01/1982	(United States) Atlantic City, New Jersey, U.S.	
Win	12-0	(United States) Johnny Heard	UD	10	23/12/1981	(United States) Providence, Rhode Island, U.S.	
Win	11-0	(United States) O'Dell Leonard	KO	5	16/09/1981	(United States) Boston, Massachusetts, U.S.	
Win	10-0	(Dominican Republic) Jesus Castro	TKO	3	06/08/1981	(United States) Atlantic City, New Jersey, U.S.	
Win	9-0	(United States) Dom DiMarzo	TKO	2	13/06/1981	(United States) Boston, Massachusetts, U.S.	Referee stopped the bout at 1:55 of the second round.
Win	8-0	(United States) James Green	PTS	8	12/04/1981	(United States) Atlantic City, New Jersey, U.S.	
Win	7-0	(United States) Jamal Arbubakar	PTS	8	06/03/1981	(United States) Worcester, Massachusetts, U.S.	
Win	6-0	(United States) Lenny Villers	KO	5	12/02/1981	(United States) Boston, Massachusetts, U.S.	
Win	5-0	(United States) Bill Harrington	KO	2	17/01/1981	(United States) Boston, Massachusetts, U.S.	
Win	4-0	(United States) Robert Thomas	KO	4	25/11/1980	(United States) Boston, Massachusetts, U.S.	
Win	3-0	(United States) Danny Heath	KO	1	02/10/1980	(United States) Boston, Massachusetts, U.S.	
Win	2-0	(United States) David Dean	KO	1	18/08/1980	(United States) Boston, Massachusetts, U.S.	
Win	1-0	(United States) Troy Vaughn	KO	3	17/05/1980	(United States) Las Vegas, Nevada, U.S.	
