= Goody Petronelli =

American boxing trainer

Guerino "Goody" Petronelli (October 12, 1923 – January 29, 2012) was an American boxing trainer and co-manager.

With his brother Pasquale (Pat), Petronelli managed and trained world middleweight champion Marvelous Marvin Hagler. His other fighters included Robbie Sims, Steve Collins, and Kevin McBride. In 1983, the Petronellis received The Al Buck Award for Manager of the Year by the International Boxing Hall of Fame.

== Career ==
He was born in Brockton, Massachusetts. Petronelli was a successful amateur welterweight boxer who retired from the US Navy as a master chief after serving from 1941 to 1969. He grew up as a close friend of Rocky Marciano. Both their fathers had emigrated from the Abruzzo region of Italy. Petronelli was also a friend of Marciano's trainer, Allie Colombo.

The Petronelli brothers opened their Brockton gym in 1969, the same year both Marciano and Colombo died (in a plane crash and an auto accident respectively.) Petronelli focused on training fighters, relying on his Navy medical experience as a cut man in the ring, while Pat mainly handled the business aspects, including fight scheduling and purse negotiations.

The teen-aged Hagler, who had moved with his mother from Newark, New Jersey to Brockton in 1967, began training at the gym shortly after it opened. Under Petronelli's tutelage, he became the National AAU 165-pound champion in 1973. Though Hagler was a top-ranked middleweight title contender for most of the 1970s, the Petronellis found it difficult to line up high-profile opponents willing to risk facing him. Hagler's race and the fact that he was a Southpaw, and a good one at that, were cited as primary obstacles. The brothers often had to travel with Hagler to other fighters' hometowns for his bouts.

Petronelli and his brother finally got Hagler his shot at the WBA and WBC middleweight titles in 1979 against Vito Antuofermo in Las Vegas, where the fight was ruled a draw in a controversial 15-round decision. In 1980, after winning 50 of 54 pro fights, Hagler got his second chance at the crowns when he faced British fighter Alan Minter, who had earlier won the title from Antuofermo. Hagler bloodied Minter early, winning on a third-round TKO. The Petronellis would guide Hagler through 12 successful world title defenses over 7 years, including celebrated bouts against Roberto Durán and Thomas Hearns, before he lost to Sugar Ray Leonard in another controversial judges' decision, a split verdict in Leonard's favor. It turned out to be Hagler's final fight.

Petronelli trained others who would fight in world title bouts: World Boxing Organization middleweight and super middleweight champion Steve Collins; Hagler's brother, United States Boxing Association middleweight champion Robbie Sims, who lost to Sumbu Kalambay in 1988 for the WBA championship; and Malawian light heavyweight Drake Thadzi, who lost to Virgil Hill in a WBA title bout in 1995.

Petronelli also trained his brother's son, Tony, who won the North American Boxing Federation light welterweight title in 1976; New England super featherweight champion Mike Cappiello; Massachusetts middleweight champion Mike Culbert; and Kevin McBride, whose TKO victory ended Mike Tyson's career in 2006. They also worked with heavyweight Peter McNeeley early in his career.

The Petronelli gym was located on Ward Street in Brockton, which the city renamed Petronelli Way in 1999. The city of Brockton honored the Petronelli brothers with the Historic Citizens Award in 2007.

Tony Petronelli took over operating the Brockton gym, which closed in 2011. Tony relocated it to nearby Stoughton under the name Big East Boxing.

== Death ==
Petronelli died January 29, 2012, in Bourne, Massachusetts of natural causes at age 88. His death came just months after the losses of his brother Pat, who died at age 89 from complications of a stroke on September 2, 2011, and Petronelli's wife of 67 years, Marian (Gorman) Petronelli, who died October 15, 2011, at age 84.
