= Juan Carlos Giménez Ferreyra =

Paraguayan boxer

J.C. Giménez Ferreyra
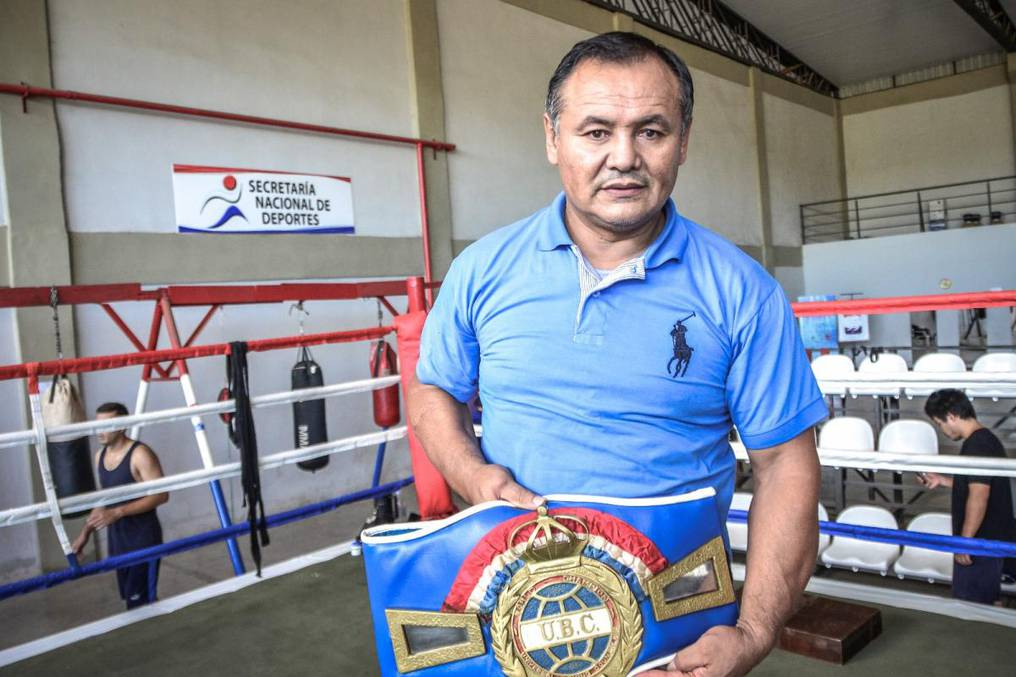
- Juan Carlos Giménez Ferreyra as a trainer of "Secretaría Nacional de Deportes" (SND) in Asunción on February 14, 2017 (Gentileza de Diario La Nación)

Personal information
- Nickname: Toro (Bull)
- Nationality: Paraguayan
- Born: Juan Carlos Giménez Ferreyra; 20 December 1960 (age 65) Asunción Paraguay
- Weight: Light middleweight Middleweight; Super middleweight Light heavyweight Cruiserweight

Boxing career

Boxing record
- Total fights: 80
- Wins: 62
- Win by KO: 42
- Losses: 14
- Draws: 4
- No contests: 0

Juan Carlos "J.C." Giménez Ferreyra (born 20 December 1960) is a Paraguayan former professional boxer. During his career he was WBC International light heavyweight champion and unsuccessfully fought for the World Super Middleweight title four times, first against Mauro Galvano in 1992, then against Chris Eubank the same year, against Nigel Benn in 1994 and finally against Joe Calzaghe in 1998, losing via doctor stoppage.

During his career he went the distance with Nigel Benn, Chris Eubank and Roberto Durán. He remained as the No. 1 in the world for 9 years in the WBO and was the WBC International champion.

He last fought in 2010, winning the Paraguayan Cruiserweight title against Nicasio Moray Martinez.
