= Doug DeWitt =

American boxer

Personal information
- Nickname: Cobra
- Born: Douglas Allen DeWitt; August 13, 1961 (age 64) Youngstown, Ohio, U.S.
- Height: 5 ft 9 in (175 cm)
- Weight: Middleweight

Boxing career
- Reach: 65 1/2 in (166 cm)
- Stance: Orthodox

Boxing record
- Total fights: 46
- Wins: 33
- Win by KO: 19
- Losses: 8
- Draws: 5

Doug DeWitt (born August 13, 1961) is an American former professional boxer who was the inaugural WBO middleweight champion of the world from 1989 to 1990.

== Career ==
DeWitt made his professional debut in 1980 & compiled a record of 30–6–4 before winning the inaugural WBO middleweight title. He would lose the title in his second defense to British boxer Nigel Benn.

== Professional boxing record ==
46 fights	33 wins	8 losses
By knockout	19	4
By decision	14	4
Draws	5	

No.	Result	Record	Opponent	Type	Round, time	Date	Location	Notes
46	Loss	33–8–5	James Toney	RTD	6 (10)	05/12/1992	Trump Taj Mahal, Atlantic City, New Jersey, U.S.	
45	Win	33–7–5	Dan Sherry	SD	10 (10)	28/05/1992	Kushers Country Club, Monticello, New York, U.S.	
44	Draw	32–7–5	Tyrone Frazier	MD	10 (10)	07/02/1992	Convention Center, Atlantic City, New Jersey, U.S.	
43	Loss	32–7–4	Nigel Benn	TKO	8 (12)	29/04/1990	Caesars, Atlantic City, New Jersey, U.S.	Lost WBO Middleweight Title
42	Win	32–6–4	Matthew Hilton	RTD	11 (12)	15/01/1990	Convention Center, Atlantic City, New Jersey, U.S.	Retained WBO Middleweight Title
41	Win	31–6–4	Robbie Sims	SD	12 (12)	18/04/1989	Showboat Hotel & Casino, Atlantic City, New Jersey, U.S.	Won inaugural WBO Middleweight Title
40	Loss	30–6–4	Sumbu Kalambay	TKO	7 (12)	08/11/1988	Stade Louis II, Monte Carlo, Monaco	For WBA Middleweight Title
39	Win	30–5–4	Alberto Gonzalez	KO	6 (10)	19/08/1988	Resorts International, Atlantic City, New Jersey, U.S.	
38	Draw	29–5–4	Ron Essett	UD	10 (10)	29/01/1988	Resorts International, Atlantic City, New Jersey, U.S.	
37	Win	29–5–3	Tony Thornton	MD	13 (12)	06/11/1987	Sands Casino Hotel, Atlantic City, New Jersey, U.S.	Won USBA Middleweight Title; Fight ended in a draw, decided with a "sudden death" 13th round
36	Win	28–5–3	Lenny LaPaglia	UD	10 (10)	18/08/1987	Resorts International, Atlantic City, New Jersey, U.S.	
35	Loss	27–5–3	José Quiñones	TKO	3 (10)	20/02/1987	Sands Casino Hotel, Atlantic City, New Jersey, U.S.	
34	Loss	27–4–3	Thomas Hearns	UD	12 (12)	17/10/1986	Cobo Hall, Detroit, Michigan, U.S.	For NABF Middleweight Title
33	Loss	27–3–3	Milton McCrory	UD	10 (10)	13/07/1986	Showboat Hotel and Casino, Las Vegas, Nevada, U.S.	
32	Win	27–2–3	Charles Boston	UD	10 (10)	06/05/1986	Harrah's Marina Hotel Casino, Atlantic City, New Jersey, U.S.	
31	Win	26–2–3	Luis Rivera	TKO	7 (10)	18/01/1986	Sands Casino Hotel, Atlantic City, New Jersey, U.S.	
30	Loss	25–2–3	Robbie Sims	UD	10 (10)	30/08/1985	Trump Plaza Hotel and Casino, Atlantic City, New Jersey, U.S.	
29	Draw	25–1–3	Don Lee	UD	10 (10)	08/03/1985	Westchester County Center, White Plains, New York, U.S.	
28	Win	25–1–2	Jimmie Sykes	TKO	1 (12)	04/10/1984	Resorts International, Atlantic City, New Jersey, U.S.	
27	Win	24–1–2	Bobby Hoye	UD	10 (10)	19/04/1984	Resorts International, Atlantic City, New Jersey, U.S.	
26	Win	23–1–2	Mike Tinley	UD	12 (12)	17/02/1984	Resorts International, Atlantic City, New Jersey, U.S.	Won ESPN Middleweight Title
25	Win	22–1–2	Freddie Boynton	RTD	5 (10)	13/01/1984	Westchester County Center, White Plains, New York, U.S.	
24	Win	21–1–2	Hector Rosario	KO	4 (10)	09/09/1983	Madison Square Garden, New York City, New York, U.S.	
23	Win	20–1–2	King Starling	TKO	8 (10)	10/08/1983	Westchester County Center, White Plains, New York, U.S.	
22	Win	19–1–2	Vernon Reed	KO	1 (10)	16/02/1983	Meadowlands Arena, East Rutherford, New Jersey, U.S.	
21	Win	18–1–2	Larry Rayford	KO	6 (10)	03/12/1982	Louisiana Superdome, New Orleans, Louisiana, U.S.	
20	Win	17–1–2	Teddy Mann	TKO	6 (10)	20/10/1982	Westchester County Center, White Plains, New York, U.S.	
19	Win	16–1–2	William Page	KO	1 (8)	02/10/1982	Sands Casino Hotel, Atlantic City, New Jersey, U.S.	
18	Win	15–1–2	Mike Hyman	TKO	6 (10)	04/08/1982	Westchester County Center, White Plains, New York, U.S.	
17	Draw	14–1–2	Ben Serrano	PTS	8 (8)	21/03/1982	Playboy Hotel and Casino, Atlantic City, New Jersey, U.S.	
16	Win	14–1–1	Bill Medei	TKO	1 (8)	04/03/1982	Sands Casino Hotel, Atlantic City, New Jersey, U.S.	
15	Win	13–1–1	Danny Long	MD	8 (8)	04/02/1982	Sands Casino Hotel, Atlantic City, New Jersey, U.S.	
14	Win	12–1–1	Charlie Hecker	TKO	5 (6)	22/12/1981	Sands Casino Hotel, Atlantic City, New Jersey, U.S.	
13	Draw	11–1–1	Tony Suero	PTS	8 (8)	24/11/1981	Westchester County Center, White Plains, New York, U.S.	
12	Win	11–1	Danny McAloon	TKO	3 (8)	09/10/1981	Westchester County Center, White Plains, New York, U.S.	
11	Win	10–1	Lenny Villers	TKO	8 (8)	25/06/1981	New Westchester Town Hall, Tarrytown, New York, U.S.	
10	Win	9–1	Kevin Cheatum	KO	1 (8)	24/04/1981	Westchester County Center, White Plains, New York, U.S.	
9	Loss	8–1	Ben Serrano	PTS	8 (8)	08/03/1981	Resorts International, Atlantic City, New Jersey, U.S.	
8	Win	8–0	Willard Nance	UD	8 (8)	18/02/1981	Westchester County Center, White Plains, New York, U.S.	
7	Win	7–0	Larry Davis	PTS	6 (6)	21/01/1981	Westchester County Center, White Plains, New York, U.S.	
6	Win	6–0	Derrick Doughty	KO	1 (6)	17/12/1980	Westchester County Center, White Plains, New York, U.S.	
5	Win	5–0	Terry Duncan	UD	6 (6)	15/10/1980	Westchester County Center, White Plains, New York, U.S.	
4	Win	4–0	Larry Davis	UD	6 (6)	17/09/1980	Westchester County Center, White Plains, New York, U.S.	
3	Win	3–0	Calvin Cook	UD	4 (4)	11/06/1980	Westchester County Center, White Plains, New York, U.S.	
2	Win	2–0	Charlie Hecker	KO	3 (4)	14/05/1980	Westchester County Center, White Plains, New York, U.S.	
1	Win	1–0	Peter Pennello	PTS	4 (4)	28/03/1980	Dick Clark Theatre, Tarrytown, New York, U.S.	

== See also ==
- List of world middleweight boxing champions

Sporting positions
World boxing titles
Inaugural champion	WBO middleweight champion April 18, 1989 – April 29, 1990	Succeeded by Nigel Benn
