= Rod Carr (boxer) =

Australian boxer

Personal information
- Nationality: Australian
- Born: 9 October 1968
- Died: 31 December 2016 (aged 48)
- Weight: super middle/light heavy/cruiserweight

Boxing career
- Stance: Orthodox

Boxing record
- Total fights: 23
- Wins: 13 (KO 11)
- Losses: 7 (KO 6)
- Draws: 3

Rodney William Carr (9 October 1968 – 12 December 2016) was an Australian professional welter/light middle/middle/super middle/light heavy/cruiserweight boxer of the 1980s and '90s who won the Oriental and Pacific Boxing Federation (OPBF) super middleweight title, Trans-Tasman super middleweight title, Australian super middleweight title, and inaugural Commonwealth super middleweight title, and was a challenger for the International Boxing Organization (IBO) super middleweight title against Rick Thornberry, and inaugural Pan Asian Boxing Association (PABA) light heavyweight title against Anthony Bigeni, his professional fighting weight varied from 164 lb (74 kg; 11 st 10 lb), i.e. super middleweight to 180 1/2 lb (81.9 kg; 12 st 12.5 lb), i.e. cruiserweight.
