= Michael Watson =

British boxer

Michael Watson MBE
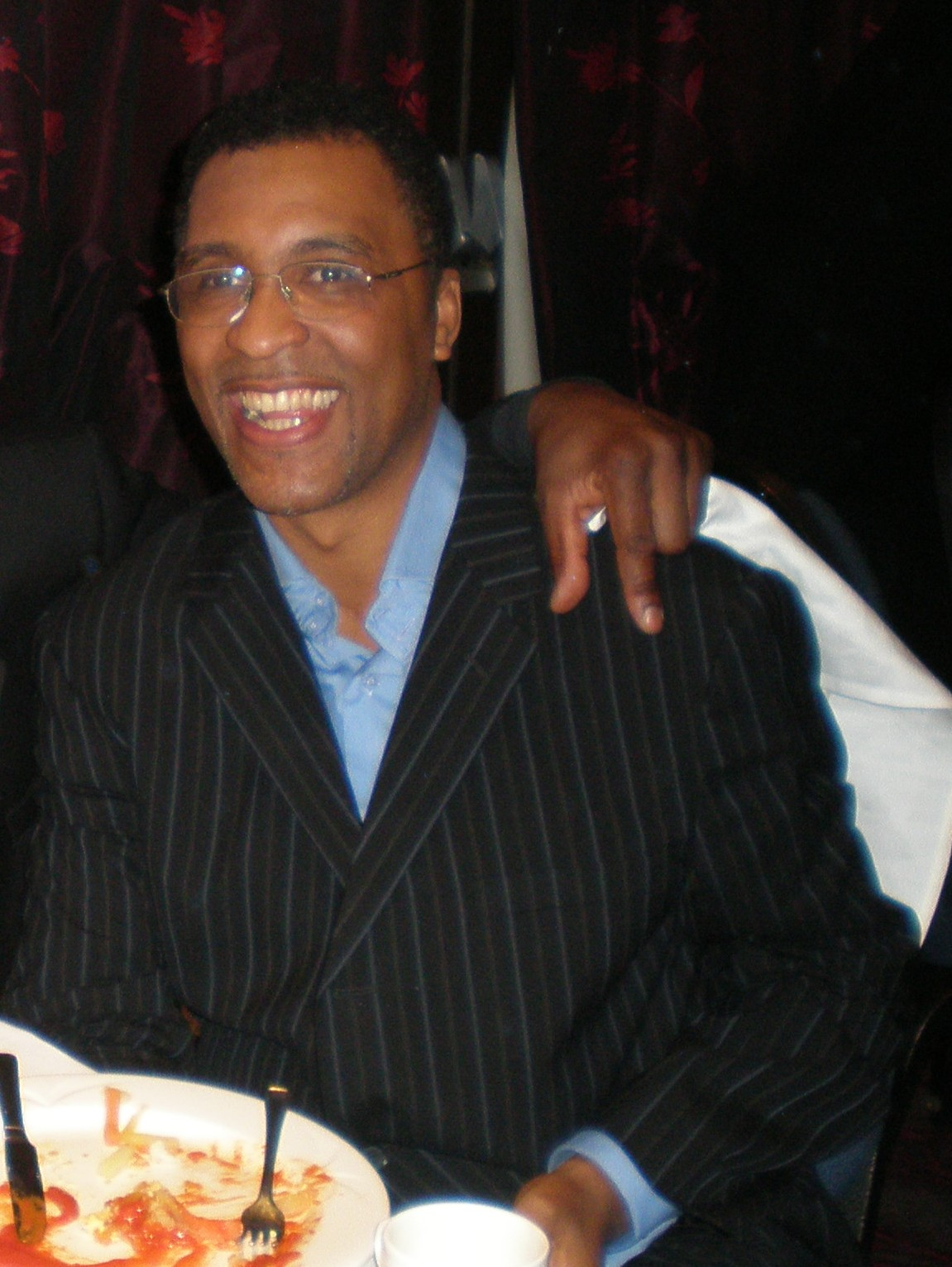
- Watson in 2008

Personal information
- Nickname: The Force
- Nationality: British
- Born: 15 March 1965 (age 61) London, England
- Weight: Middleweight; Super-middleweight

Boxing career
- Stance: Orthodox

Boxing record
- Total fights: 30
- Wins: 25
- Win by KO: 21
- Losses: 4
- Draws: 1

Michael Watson MBE (born 15 March 1965) is a British former professional boxer who competed from 1984 to 1991. He held the Commonwealth middleweight title from 1989 to 1991, and challenged three times for a world title between 1990 and 1991. Watson's career was cut short as a result of a near-fatal injury sustained during a loss to Chris Eubank for the WBO super-middleweight title in 1991.

== Amateur career ==
At the age of fourteen, Watson began boxing at the Crown and Manor Boxing Club, where he trained under coaches Kemal Yalçınoğlu and Bib Kipps. Watson has recalled that Kemal told him he would become a champion during his early years in the sport, a moment he later discussed in the 2011 Sky Sports documentary The People's Champion. In 1980, he won the London Schools title in the under-71 kg division.

He had an impressive 20–2 record at the Crown and Manor Club. He transferred to the Colvestone Boxing Club where he trained and sparred for over a year with Kirkland Laing, Dennis Andries, and Darren Dyer. He entered the 1983/84 Nationals at under 75 kg and won the title. On his 19th birthday he fought John Beckles during the 1984 London ABAs, both being national champions. Watson, initially seen as the underdog, won the fight in just over 30 seconds, and was seen as a hope for a boxing medal at the 1984 Los Angeles Olympic Games. However, that place on the Olympic team was taken by Liverpool's Brian Schumacher.

== Professional career ==
Watson's professional career lasted from 1984 to 1991. The highlight was his May 1989 victory over Nigel Benn to secure the British Commonwealth middleweight title. This led to a world title clash with Jamaican Mike McCallum, who defeated Watson by a knockout in the eleventh round.

On 22 June 1991 at Earl's Court, he met Chris Eubank in another opportunity for the world middleweight title. Eubank won by a majority decision of 116–113, 115–113 and 114–114, close enough to incur dissent from some commentators and supporters.

=== Rematch with Eubank and career-ending injury ===
A rematch was arranged on 21 September 1991 at White Hart Lane, this time for the vacant WBO super middleweight title. In round 11, with Watson ahead on points and seemingly on the verge of a stoppage victory, he knocked Eubank down with an overhand right. Moments later, Eubank was back on his feet and connected with a devastating uppercut, which caused Watson to fall back and hit the back of his head against the ropes.

Referee Roy Francis stopped the fight in round 12, after which Watson collapsed in the ring. There was no ambulance or paramedic at the event. Doctors wearing dinner jackets arrived but only after more than eight minutes had elapsed, during which time the fallen fighter received no oxygen. A total of 28 minutes elapsed before Watson received treatment in a hospital neurosurgical unit. He spent 40 days in a coma and had six brain operations to remove a blood clot.

After regaining consciousness, he spent over a year in intensive care and rehabilitation and six more years using a wheelchair while he slowly recovered some movement and regained the ability to speak and write. Peter Hamlyn, the consultant neurosurgeon who operated on Watson, said in 2010, "I think back to those first days, and the milestone moments. The first eight months were so depressing. He couldn't hear, couldn't speak, couldn't walk. Slowly, he clawed it all back. So extraordinary".

== Life after boxing ==
Watson sued the British Boxing Board of Control (BBBoC) for negligence and won damages reputedly of around £1 million. The High Court ruled that the BBBoC was responsible for medical provision at a fight and that administering oxygen and resuscitation on site would have made a considerable difference to Watson's outcome. Mr Justice Kennedy said that the board was "in breach of its duty to Mr Watson". This decision was upheld at the Court of Appeal, and the BBBoC did not appeal to the House of Lords, selling their London headquarters to pay out a £400,000 compensation settlement. The judge said that this was "sadly a long way short of the damages that [Watson] would have received had the defendants had the money or had they been insured".

On 19 April 2003 Watson completed the London Marathon, walking two hours each morning and afternoon for six days. Raising money for the Brain and Spine Foundation, Watson slept overnight in a support bus. Finishing the race by his side were Chris Eubank and his neurosurgeon Peter Hamlyn, both of whom had become his personal friends. On 4 February 2004 Watson was awarded the MBE by Queen Elizabeth II for his services to disability sport. Watson was announced as a torchbearer in the 2012 Paralympic relay.

In February 2017 Watson and his carer, Lennard Ballack, were victims of a carjacking in Chingford, London. During the attack, Ballack had ammonia sprayed in his face and was beaten, whilst Watson was dragged along the road when the car was driven off, unable to escape. Watson suffered flashbacks and seizures after the event. The two attackers were later sentenced to 16 years in prison for their part in the attack and other crimes.

== Professional boxing record ==
30 fights	25 wins	4 losses
By knockout	21	2
By decision	4	2
Draws	1	

No.	Result	Record	Opponent	Type	Round, time	Date	Location	Notes
30	Loss	25–4–1	Chris Eubank	TKO	12 (12), 0:29	21 Sep 1991	White Hart Lane, London, England	For vacant WBO super-middleweight title
29	Loss	25–3–1	Chris Eubank	MD	12	22 Jun 1991	Earls Court Exhibition Centre, London, England	For WBO middleweight title
28	Win	25–2–1	Anthony Brown	KO	1 (10)	1 May 1991	York Hall, London, England	
27	Win	24–2–1	Craig Trotter	TKO	6 (12)	23 Jan 1991	Brentwood Centre, Brentwood, England	Retained Commonwealth middleweight title
26	Win	23–2–1	Errol Christie	TKO	3 (10)	18 Nov 1990	National Exhibition Centre, Birmingham, England	
25	Loss	22–2–1	Mike McCallum	KO	11 (12), 2:22	14 Apr 1990	Royal Albert Hall, London, England	For WBA middleweight title
24	Win	22–1–1	Nigel Benn	TKO	6 (12), 1:34	21 May 1989	Finsbury Park Majestic Ballroom, London, England	Won Commonwealth middleweight title
23	Win	21–1–1	Franklin Owens	TKO	3 (10)	8 Mar 1989	Royal Albert Hall, London, England	
22	Win	20–1–1	Jimmy Shavers	TKO	3 (10), 2:20	18 Jan 1989	Royal Albert Hall, London, England	
21	Win	19–1–1	Reggie Miller	TKO	5 (10), 3:00	24 Oct 1988	Blazers Nightclub, Windsor, England	
20	Draw	18–1–1	Israel Cole	TD	2 (8)	28 Jul 1988	Caesars Palace, Paradise, Nevada, US	Cole was cut from an accidental head clash
19	Win	18–1	Ricky Stackhouse	TKO	4 (10)	4 May 1988	Wembley Conference Centre, London, England	
18	Win	17–1	Joe McKnight	TKO	4 (10)	13 Apr 1988	York Hall, London, England	
17	Win	16–1	Kenneth Styles	TKO	9 (10)	9 Mar 1988	Wembley Conference Centre, London, England	
16	Win	15–1	Don Lee	TKO	5 (10), 2:05	3 Feb 1988	Wembley Conference Centre, London, England	
15	Win	14–1	Sam Houston	TKO	2 (8)	28 Oct 1987	Wembley Conference Centre, London, England	
14	Win	13–1	Franky Moro	TKO	4 (8)	5 Oct 1987	Hotel Splendide, London, England	
13	Win	12–1	Cliff Gilpin	PTS	8	19 Mar 1987	York Hall, London, England	
12	Win	11–1	Ralph Smiley	PTS	8	22 Feb 1987	Wembley Conference Centre, London, England	
11	Win	10–1	Ian Chantler	TKO	4 (8)	19 Jan 1987	Grosvenor House Hotel, London, England	
10	Win	9–1	Alan Baptiste	PTS	8	4 Nov 1986	Wembley Arena, London, England	
9	Win	8–1	Simon Collins	KO	1 (8)	19 Jul 1986	Wembley Stadium, London, England	
8	Loss	7–1	James Cook	PTS	8	20 May 1986	Wembley Arena, London, England	
7	Win	7–0	Carlton Warren	PTS	6	7 May 1986	Royal Albert Hall, London, England	
6	Win	6–0	Karl Barwise	TKO	3 (6), 1:29	19 Feb 1986	Royal Albert Hall, London, England	
5	Win	5–0	Martin McEwan	TKO	6 (6), 1:31	5 Nov 1985	Wembley Arena, London, England	
4	Win	4–0	Gary Tomlinson	TKO	4 (6), 2:04	5 Jun 1985	Royal Albert Hall, London, England	
3	Win	3–0	Dennis Sheehan	TKO	3 (6), 2:01	14 Apr 1985	York Hall, London, England	
2	Win	2–0	Johnny Elliott	TKO	8 (8), 1:20	26 Feb 1985	York Hall, London, England	
1	Win	1–0	Winston Wray	TKO	4 (4), 1:10	16 Oct 1984	Royal Albert Hall, London, England	

Sporting positions
Regional boxing titles
Preceded by Nigel Benn	Commonwealth middleweight champion 21 May 1989 – May 1991	Vacant Title next held by Richie Woodhall
Awards
Previous: Mike Tyson vs. Buster Douglas; Round 8	KO Magazine Round of the Year vs. Michael Watson II; Round 11; 1991	Next: Evander Holyfield vs. Riddick Bowe; Round 10
