= Mauro Galvano =

Italian boxer

Personal information
- Born: 30 March 1964 (age 62) Fiumicino, Lazio, Italy
- Height: 5 ft 11 1/2 in (182 cm)
- Weight: Super middleweight; Light heavyweight

Boxing career
- Stance: Orthodox

Boxing record
- Total fights: 40
- Wins: 30
- Win by KO: 7
- Losses: 8
- Draws: 2

Mauro Galvano (born 30 March 1964 in Fiumicino, Roma) is a professional boxer who reigned as WBC Super Middleweight Champion.

== Amateur career ==
As an amateur, Galvano was the 1984 Italian Middleweight Champion and the 1985 Italian Light-Heavyweight Champion.

== Professional career ==
Galvano turned pro in 1986 and won the Vacant WBC super-middleweight title with a decision win over Dario Walter Matteoni in 1990. He defended the belt twice before losing it to Nigel Benn via TKO in 1992. In the rematch with Benn in 1993, Galvano again came up short in a decision loss. He retired in 1997.

== Professional boxing record ==
40 fights	30 wins	8 losses
By knockout	7	3
By decision	22	5
By disqualification	1	0
Draws	2	

No.	Result	Record	Opponent	Type	Round, time	Date	Location	Notes
40	Loss	30–8–2	Andrey Shkalikov	TKO	8 (12)	1997-03-15	Mazara del Vallo, Italy	For vacant European super-middleweight title
39	Win	30–7–2	Charles Scott	PTS	6 (6)	1996-09-12	Palazzo Dello Sport, Civitavecchia, Italy	
38	Loss	29–7–2	Frederic Seillier	PTS	12 (12)	1996-07-05	Espace 3000, Hyères, France	For vacant European super-middleweight title
37	Win	29–6–2	Jose Cataneo	PTS	8 (8)	1996-03-09	PalaLido, Milan, Italy	
36	Win	28–6–2	Istvan Beszedes	PTS	8 (8)	1996-02-01	Sun Island, Fiumicino, Italy	
35	Loss	27–6–2	Henry Wharton	KO	4 (12)	1995-07-08	Barbican Centre, York, England, U.K.	For vacant European super-middleweight title
34	Win	27–5–2	Joe Harris	KO	2 (?)	1995-04-07	Hotel Sheraton, Rome, Italy	
33	Win	26–5–2	Vladimir Evstratov	UD	12 (12)	1994-12-26	Rome, Italy	Won vacant WBO Inter-Continental super-middleweight title
32	Win	25–5–2	Yuri Klestov	RTD	6 (12)	1994-08-24	San Benedetto del Tronto, Italy	Won vacant IBF International light-heavyweight title
31	Loss	24–5–2	Frederic Seillier	PTS	10 (10)	1994-03-17	Espace Piscine, Antibes, France	
30	Loss	24–4–2	Vincenzo Nardiello	UD	12 (12)	1993-11-26	Palaghiaccio di Marino, Marino, Italy	For vacant European super-middleweight title
29	Win	24–3–2	David McCluskey	TKO	3 (8)	1993-08-21	Salle des Étoiles, Larvotto, Monaco	
28	Win	23–3–2	Kevin Whaley El	DQ	1 (?)	1993-06-12	Fiumicino, Italy	
27	Loss	22–3–2	Nigel Benn	UD	12 (12)	1993-03-06	SEC Centre, Glasgow, Scotland, U.K.	For WBC super-middleweight title
26	Win	22–2–2	Melvin Wynn	PTS	8 (8)	1992-12-26	Gaggiano, Italy	
25	Loss	21–2–2	Nigel Benn	RTD	3 (12)	1992-10-03	Palaghiaccio di Marino, Marino, Italy	Lost WBC super-middleweight title
24	Win	21–1–2	Eduardo Andres Peralta	PTS	10 (10)	1992-08-12	Marina di Grosseto, Italy	
23	Win	20–1–2	Eladio Centurion	PTS	10 (10)	1992-04-25	Grosseto, Italy	
22	Win	19–1–2	Juan Carlos Giménez Ferreyra	UD	12 (12)	1992-02-06	Palaghiaccio di Marino, Marino, Italy	Retained WBC super-middleweight title
21	Win	18–1–2	Ramon Florencio Ramos	PTS	10 (10)	1991-11-23	Castiglione della Pescaia, Italy	
20	Win	17–1–2	Ron Essett	UD	12 (12)	1991-07-27	Palazzo Dello Sport, Capo d'Orlando, Italy	Retained WBC super-middleweight title
19	Win	16–1–2	Dario Walter Matteoni	UD	12 (12)	1990-12-15	Salle des Étoiles, Larvotto, Monaco	Won vacant WBC super-middleweight title
18	Win	15–1–2	Mark Kaylor	UD	12 (12)	1990-03-31	Capo d'Orlando, Italy	Won vacant European super-middleweight title
17	Win	14–1–2	Jean Paul Roux	PTS	8 (8)	1989-12-20	Palermo, Italy	
16	Win	13–1–2	Klayima Awouitoh	PTS	8 (8)	1989-10-25	Ferrara, Italy	
15	Win	12–1–2	Pascal Germijns	TKO	3 (?)	1989-08-13	San Mango d'Aquino, Italy	
14	Loss	11–1–2	Mwehu Beya	SD	12 (12)	1989-06-09	Pomezia, Italy	For Italian light-heavyweight title
13	Win	11–0–2	Kevin Roper	RTD	5 (6)	1989-01-25	PalaCaselle, Arezzo, Italy	
12	Draw	10–0–2	Mwehu Beya	PTS	12 (12)	1988-11-19	Gragnano, Italy	For Italian light-heavyweight title
11	Win	10–0–1	Julio Abel Gonzalez	PTS	8 (8)	1988-09-14	Scheggia e Pascelupo, Italy	
10	Win	9–0–1	Mustafa Moussa	PTS	8 (8)	1988-07-30	Livorno, Italy	
9	Win	8–0–1	Moba Salay	PTS	6 (6)	1988-05-20	San Mango, Italy	
8	Win	7–0–1	Ndomingiedi Lusikina	PTS	6 (6)	1988-03-26	Crotone, Italy	
7	Win	6–0–1	Michel Moukory	TKO	4 (?)	1987-10-31	Azzano San Paolo, Italy	
6	Win	5–0–1	Ndomingiedi Lusikina	PTS	6 (6)	1987-07-25	Ostia, Italy	
5	Draw	4–0–1	Biagio Vallefuoco	PTS	6 (6)	1986-10-24	Carrara, Italy	
4	Win	4–0	Klayima Awouitoh	PTS	6 (6)	1986-10-04	PalaRuffini, Turin, Italy	
3	Win	3–0	Ndomingiedi Lusikina	PTS	4 (4)	1986-05-08	Salerno, Italy	
2	Win	2–0	Joseph Kassongo	PTS	6 (6)	1986-04-19	Sanremo Casino, Sanremo, Italy	
1	Win	1–0	Gabriele Lazzari	TKO	4 (?)	1986-02-26	Cosenza, Italy	

== Criminal charges ==
In 2012, Galvano was sentenced to a six-year prison term for his part in gang related crimes such as extortion.

== See also ==
- List of world super-middleweight boxing champions

Sporting positions
Regional boxing titles
New title	European super-middleweight champion March 31, 1990 – December 15, 1990; Won world title	Vacant Title next held by James Cook
New title	IBF International light-heavyweight champion August 24, 1994 – 1995; Vacated	Vacant Title next held by Alexey Trofimov
New title	WBO Inter-Continental super-middleweight champion December 26, 1994 – October 3, 1992	Vacant Title next held by Mark Delaney
World boxing titles
Vacant Title last held by Sugar Ray Leonard	WBC super-middleweight champion December 15, 1990 – October 3, 1992	Succeeded by Nigel Benn
