= One Night in Millstreet =

Page for Film released in 2023, currently on festival circuit

- Directed by: Andrew Gallimore
- Produced by: Morgan Bushe; Peter Murnaghan; Lydia Monin
- Starring: Barry McGuigan; Barry Hearn; Chris Eubank; Steve Collins; Tony Quinn
- Cinematography: Stephen J. Hart
- Edited by: Eoin McDonagh
- Release date: November 11, 2023; (Cork Film Festival)
- Running time: 79 Minutes
- Country: Ireland
- Language: English

One Night in Millstreet is a 2023 documentary film directed by Andrew Gallimore about the 1995 super-middleweight championship fight between Steve Collins and Chris Eubank at Millstreet, County Cork.

== Cast ==
- Barry McGuigan
- Barry Hearn
- Chris Eubank
- Steve Collins
- Tony Quinn
- Paul Dempsey as himself (commentator)

== Premise ==
The film recounts how Collins was picked for the fight with Eubank and how Collins worked with cult leader Tony Quinn.

== Tony Quinn ==
Andrew Pulver of The Guardian wrote of Tony Quinn's appearance in the film "Presented here as a flamboyant eccentric, the film doesn’t enlarge on Quinn’s other activities, which are interesting, to say the least", with a hyperlink to a 2012 Irish Independent article about Quinn titled "Tony Quinn: his young lover Eve, his massive fortune and the prayers for cash".

Paul Whitington commented in the Irish Independent, "With little time to prepare, and his normal coach not available, Collins flew to Las Vegas to train on his own. Then, by a stroke of luck, he ran into Tony Quinn — yoga guru, sometime cult leader and self-professed ‘mind coach’. Though Quinn, as he proudly states in the documentary, knew nothing about boxing, he persuaded Collins that victory and defeat, pain and fatigue, were all in the mind."

It has been reported that followers of Quinn believe him to be the reincarnation of Jesus, able to cure cancer, can "cast out evil spirits", and that he can walk on water.

In the film Paul Howard claims Quinn was known for Hypnotism tapes and helping people give up smoking. In a paid-for newspaper supplement published in 1994 in Ireland for Quinn and his various schemes there is a promotion of Max Gerson's discredited therapy for Cancer. The supplement also promoted the Educo Seminar, included a reader's claim of "A remarkable recovery from ME" and promoted Quinn's Prayer Request System. Another supplement published in 1994 claimed Quinn's Prayer Request System cured Epilepsy.

The film attributes the title of "Dr." to Quinn, however Quinn's doctorate of Clinical Hypnotherapy was conferred by the unaccredited American Institute of Hypnotherapy (AIH), based in Santa Ana, California, which was offered as a distance-learning correspondence programme at the cost of $3,300.

Quinn confirmed he was not awarded a PhD in the Eastern Caribbean Supreme Court (Commercial Division) in 2012 where the court judged Quinn was invalidly appointed a director of International Natural Energy after a follower of Quinn's attempted to deceive the court with a forged document purporting to be signed by all founders.

It was reported in 2012 that Quinn, and follower Susan Morrice, had paid €1.3 million for security company Henrima to create intelligence files on Sunday World journalist Nicola Tallant, RTÉ's Joe Duffy and Dialogue Ireland director and Cult expert Mike Garde.

Details of the intelligence dossiers were revealed when the Irish High Court ruled against attempts to force Tallant and Garde to appear in depositions in Colorado, in effect changing the Irish constitution. The judgement stated, had they appeared in deposition Tallant and Garde would likely be forced to reveal sources behind stories in the press about Quinn.

Sarah Gilhooly, who describes herself as "working alongside Tony", is thanked in the credits of the film.

Director Gallimore addressed criticism the film was a whitewash in an interview with Echo Live, "We couldn’t go into all the issues because this is about Millstreet and the fight. There are other documentaries to be made about him; this was not the time."

There are four broadcast-television documentaries about Quinn, two alluding to him leading a Cult. One documentary demonstrates a Quinn follower exhibiting what can be described as the Dunning–Kruger effect and failing to meet expectations.

Dialogue Ireland, a charitable trust promoting awareness and understanding of religious issues and cultism in Ireland, announced in July 2023 that a documentary-maker was researching Quinn and his Educo Cult.

Broadcaster RTÉ announced in December 2024 that it would broadcast the documentary over Christmas despite RTÉ journalist Anna Nolan writing in 2010 of the fear ex-followers of Quinn have over speaking out against him.

== Reception ==
Andrew Pulver of The Guardian opined "Venue operator Noel C Duggan is presented, hilariously, as a backwoods chancer who bamboozled hard-nosed boxing insiders such as Barry Hearn into staging the fight."

Rory Cashin of Joe commented "The preening, self-regarding, and mentally formidable Super Middleweight Champion, Chris Eubank, and the hungry challenger from Cabra, Steve Collins."

Donald Clarke of The Irish Times reviewed and stated "Nobody mentions the eventual result. Right until the triumphant hand is raised both men seem plausible winners."
