= Kim Simplis Barrow =

Belizean activist and philanthropist

- Born: March 3, 1972 (age 54); Belize City, British Honduras (present-day Belize)
- Occupations: Former prime minister's wife, activist
- Years active: 2008–2020
- Known for: Lifeline Foundation

Kim Simplis Barrow (born March 3, 1972) is a Belizean activist, philanthropist, and spouse of the 4th prime minister of Belize, Rt. Hon. Dean Oliver Barrow, MP. She served as Epecial envoy for Women and Children and founder of the Lifeline Foundation.

In 2008, she became the first Belizean to be designated as a Global Ambassador by Special Olympics International.

== Career ==
=== Early career ===
She was born in Belize City, British Honduras on 3 March 1972. After obtaining two master's degrees from Florida International University, Simplis Barrow returned to Belize and became the executive director of the Belize Tourism Association before turning to NGOs. As executive director of the association, she made numerous contributions to the strategic development as well as the implementation of the long-term road map for Belize's tourism industry. Prior to this position, she served as marketing director for the popular Fiesta Inn Hotel properties in Mazatlan, Cozumel and Belize.

=== Lifeline Foundation ===
The Lifeline Foundation was started in 2005 and registered as a charitable foundation and NGO in 2006 in Belize. Its primary objective is to assist generally with the welfare of children in Belize. It raises tens of thousands of dollars annually to aid disenfranchised children. The foundation's primary focus has been on children living with HIV/AIDS, support to children outside of familial care settings, and nutrition programs for children.

The following are some accomplishments of the Lifeline Foundation.

- Implemented feeding programs
- Built cafeterias at schools
- Provided educational material for students and teaching material for teachers
- Built classrooms at several schools
- Built proper toilet facilities
- Donating furniture and fixtures for classrooms
- Donating medication for persons living with HIV/AIDS
- Donating money to organizations that are directly working with cancer victims
- Donating to orphanages

The Lifeline Foundation celebrated its ten-year anniversary in 2015.

=== Special Envoy for Women and Children ===
As Special Envoy for Women and Children, Simplis Barrow is the Belizean champion for children, undertaking projects big and small and working primarily in collaboration with the Ministries of Health and Human Development, the National Committee for Families and Children and local non-government organizations in advocating for the passage of legislation and the development of social policies and programs that promote and protect children's wellbeing.

In early 2013, Simplis Barrow initiated the construction of two much-needed facilities designed to improve the lives of some of Belize's most vulnerable children. The first of these facilities is the Inspiration Centre, which opened in March 2014 and now provides integrated care services to poor children with disabilities. The other facility is a Pediatric and Neonatal Intensive Care wing at the national referral hospital which opened on October 27, 2015. The construction of both of these multimillion-dollar projects was financed by local and international fundraising efforts, including two Inspiration Telethons in Belize; the first of which raised a million dollars in one day for the Inspiration Center. Both the Inspiration Centre and the Pediatric and Neonatal Intensive Care wings are the only ones of their kind in the country.

She has hosted national conferences to raise awareness on the subject of commercial sexual exploitation of children and successfully advocated for the passage of legislation on the commercial sexual exploitation of children and human trafficking as well as the passage of amendments to the criminal code for stiffer penalties for all perpetrators of sexual violence against children.

Also in 2013, Simplis Barrow embarked on a public education campaign titled “My Body is Precious” that seeks to empower children and adolescents with information on sexual abuse and exploitation. She has co-authored two books as a part of the campaign. The first was a child-friendly book on sexual abuse prevention that targets 6 to 10-year-olds. This book was launched in April 2013 and resulted in a countrywide tour that included the dramatization of the book and a song. The second book targets adolescent girls and was distributed at a countrywide Girl Empowerment speaking tour that was launched in early 2014.

On March 6, 2014, Simplis Barrow, along with the National Women's Commission, put together the first 20,000 STRONG Women's Empowerment Rally which brought together thousands of women and girls countrywide, the largest non-political crowd ever gathered in Belize in a magnificent show of solidarity for women's empowerment. From this movement, the Special Envoy made a significant step forward to financially empower Belize's women and girls, hosting a National Call to Action Conference on Women's and Girls’ Financial Health. Simplis Barrow took that call to action to the rest of the world with a First Ladies Conference held as a side event at the 69th United Nations General Assembly. The gathering of spouses of heads of state and governments was encouraged to support areas of micro-financing for female entrepreneurs, violence prevention initiatives, and women's health and education. Thousands gathered again on March 11, 2016, when the second 20,000 STRONG Rally was held, coinciding with the unveiling of the 20-4-20 Women's Economic Empowerment Program.

These crucial issues make for a busy schedule, but the Spirit of Christmas is never missing at the Special Envoy office. Each year Simplis Barrow hosts a Christmas concert for the young residents of children's homes across the country to ensure that while they are away from their families during the holidays, they still get to enjoy the cheers of the season. This concert along with the annual launch of Inspiration Calendars featuring artwork by children with disabilities and agendas sold a source of funding for the Inspiration Center, are the Special Envoy's signature end-of-year events.

Simplis Barrow states in her book "Reflections on 13 Years of Advocacy, Activism and Visionary Public Service to Belize 2008-2020" that she attended a fundraising event for the Inspiration Center on 30 October 2010 in Dublin organised by Michael McCarthy, Anne Kinsella, Emma Fitzpatrick, Patricia Fitzpatrick, Susan Morrice and others from Belize Natural Energy and International Natural Energy.

In 2009, the Sunday World revealed that Patricia Fitzpatrick was a recruiter for the Educo Seminar. Educo has been described as "Cult-like".

In 2011, The Irish Times reported that Fitzpatrick was an "associate of Mr [Tony] Quinn's" and had tried to dissuade International Natural Energy investors from attending an EGM held to discuss removing Tony Quinn from the board of INE. In 2012 the Eastern Caribbean Supreme Court Commercial Division ruled Quinn's appointment to the board invalid.

McCarthy, Kinsella, and Emma Fitzpatrick all appeared in promotional material for the seminar. Morrice is on record as promoting the seminar.

== Health ==
Simplis Barrow was diagnosed with stage 3 breast cancer in October 2011. Instead of withdrawing and privately coping with her illness, she parlayed the fight for her life into a successful campaign to increase public awareness on cancer and reduce stigma and discrimination by going public. She worked closely with the Belize Cancer Society to increase cancer awareness among the local population by hosting cancer forums and talking about her own diagnosis. She has completed her chemotherapy and radiation treatments and is today in good health.

== Education ==
Simplis Barrow holds two master's degrees, in International Business and Hospitality Management, both from Florida International University. She received her bachelor's degree in Hospitality, with a minor in Spanish, from the Instituto Tecnológico de Morelia in Morelia, Michoacán, Mexico.

== Family ==
Simplis Barrow married long-time boyfriend and prime minister of Belize, Rt. Hon. Dean Barrow, on 7 February 2009 in Savannah, Georgia. They have one daughter, Salima Barrow.
