= Chris Eubank =

English boxer (born 1966)

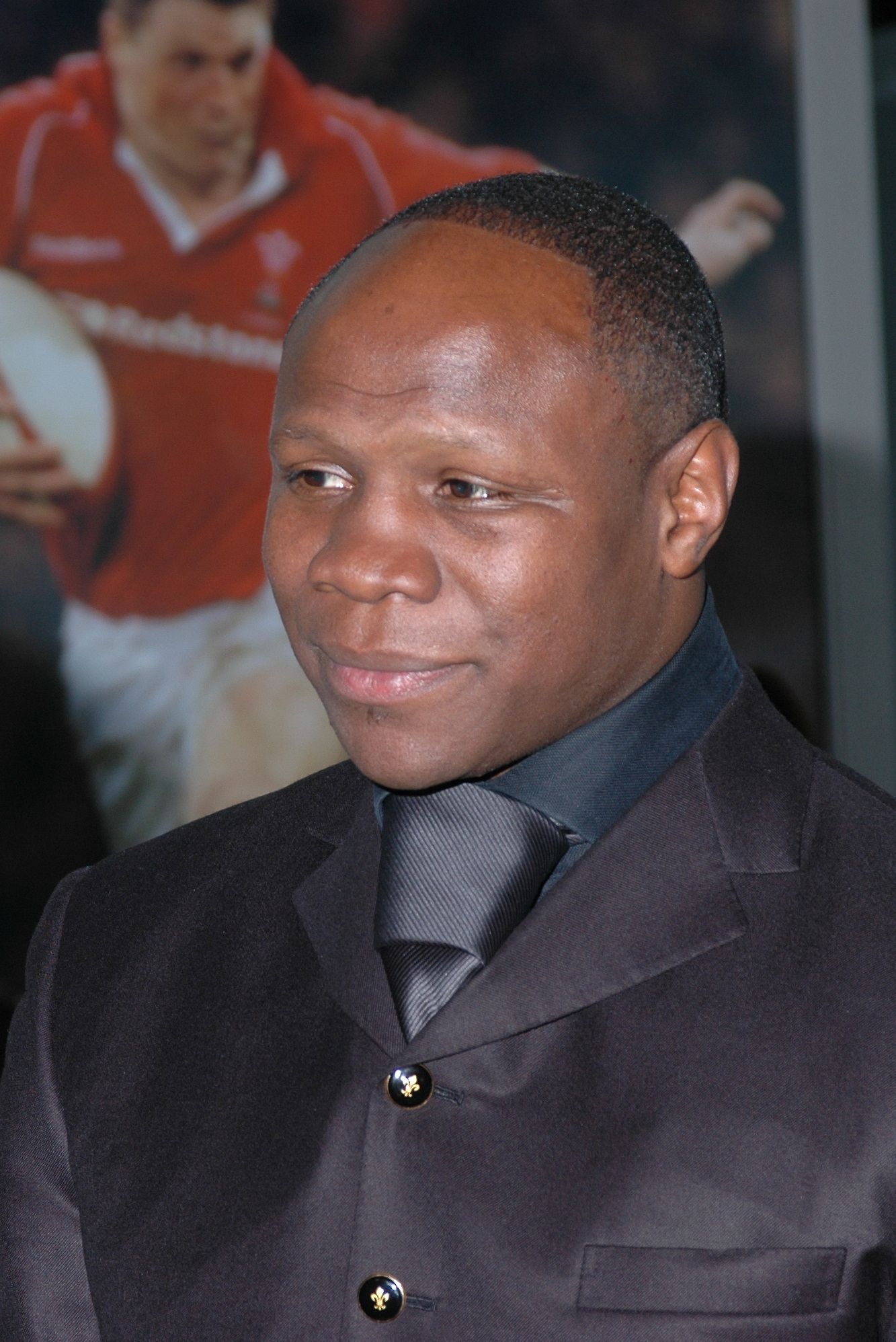
- Eubank in 2005
- Born: Christopher Livingstone Eubank; 8 August 1966 (age 60); Dulwich, London, England
- Other names: Simply the Best; English
- Height: 178 cm (5 ft 10 in)
- Division: Middleweight; Super-Middleweight; Cruiserweight
- Reach: 73 in (185 cm)
- Style: Boxing
- Stance: Orthodox

Professional boxing record
- Total: 52
- Wins: 45
- By knockout: 23
- Losses: 5
- By knockout: 1
- Draws: 2

Other information
- Children: Chris Eubank Jr. (Son)
- Boxing record from BoxRec

Christopher Livingstone Eubank (also Christopher Livingstone Eubank Sr. born 8 August 1966) is a British former professional boxer who competed from 1985 to 1998. He is a world champion in two weight classes, having held the held the World Boxing Organization (WBO) middleweight title from 1990 to 1991, and the WBO super-middleweight title from 1991 to 1995.

Eubank is ranked by BoxRec as the third best British super-middleweight boxer of all time. His son, Chris Eubank Jr., is also a professional boxer.

== Early life ==
Eubank, was born on 8 August 1966, in Dulwich, South London, to Rachel Scollins. From when he was two months old until the age of six, he was raised in Jamaica. On his return to England, he lived in Stoke Newington, Dalston in the London Borough of Hackney and then Peckham in the London Borough of Southwark, in a largely impoverished environment.

He attended Northwold Primary School in Upper Clapton, Bellenden Junior School, and then Thomas Calton Secondary School in Peckham, from where he was suspended 18 times in one year and then expelled, despite claiming he was gallantly trying to protect other children from bullies. Some time was spent at Orchard Lodge Regional Resource Centre, Anerley, in 1981. When he was 16, his father sent him to New York to live with his mother in the tough South Bronx district.

== Amateur career ==
Eubank made a fresh start in New York, where he trained at the Jerome Boxing Club on Westchester Avenue, following in the footsteps of his elder brothers (twins, Peter and Simon Eubank) back in England. Eubank became obsessed with boxing training and went to the gym every day, working as caretaker to pay his way. He won the 1984 Spanish Golden Gloves Tournament and also got to the semi-final stage of the main Golden Gloves tourney at Madison Square Garden at aged 18.

He writes in his autobiography that his drive to succeed in boxing came through his drive to become an accepted individual, largely caused by subjective bullying from his elder brothers.

== Professional career ==
=== Early career ===
Eubank made his professional debut at the Atlantis Hotel and Casino against Tim Brown, shortly after his 19th birthday. Although his next 10 fights went largely unnoticed, in February 1989 he made brief headlines in defeating Jamaican Anthony Logan in an undercard match to a Nigel Benn-headliner. Benn was a rising star at the time and Logan had come close to beating him. Eubank now made Brighton in England his adopted hometown and set his sights on Benn, believing he could beat him.

After a string of stoppage victories following a dominant 10-round decision over American gatekeeper Randy Smith, Eubank captured the WBC International title in 1990 against Hugo Corti. Later in the year, he knocked out Renaldo Dos Santos in precisely 20 seconds (including the 10-count).

=== WBO middleweight champion ===
==== Eubank vs. Benn ====
Eubank won the WBO middleweight title against Nigel Benn (and the odds) in a classic encounter that was later released on DVD: a gruelling battle which ended when Benn (ahead on points, but only narrowly) was stopped on his feet near the end of round 9. Eubank would defend the title successfully against Dan Sherry (in a fight cut short by a headbutt, for which Eubank was penalised 2 points but still won on points over the 9 completed rounds), fellow Briton Gary Stretch and fellow Briton, Michael Watson, fighting him to a narrow 12-round majority decision in Eubank's favour. This concluded Eubank's career as a middleweight, with a 28–0 record.

=== WBO super-middleweight champion ===
A rematch with Watson for the vacant WBO super-middleweight title took place in September 1991, in which Watson suffered a near-fatal injury. Eubank was behind on all scorecards after 10 rounds, and was knocked down 18 seconds from the end of the round. He rose from the canvas (being given only a standing four-count instead of eight) to unleash a devastating uppercut to Watson's jaw right at the end of the round, knocking Watson's head and neck backwards into the ring ropes. The bell sounded to end the round as soon as Watson was up from the count. It was still obvious to all observers – and to Eubank himself – that he needed a knockout to win: and early in the 12th, with Watson still visibly shaken, the fight was stopped with Watson under a flurry of punches from Eubank. Soon after the fight Watson collapsed in his corner. His condition may have been worsened by delay in receiving medical attention: there was no ambulance or paramedic at the event and after eight minutes on the ring floor, Watson was attended by doctors wearing dinner jackets, arriving late. Following the fight, Eubank contemplated quitting the sport. Commentator Reg Gutteridge said, in the moment, he had, "never seen a more dramatic end to a world title fight". Eubank later reflected on the aftermath: "I lost my finishing instinct in the ring – I couldn't finish fights any more. However, I needed to work and so I carried on and I won most of my fights on decisions. And I blamed myself, after all, it was me who threw the punch."

Eubank was particularly noted for his confidence, concentration, composure, and extravagant behaviour, and antics that included a vault over the top-rope into the ring before each fight. His trademark theme tune was Tina Turner's "Simply the Best". He would often engage in posturing (particularly between rounds of fights). Eubank was by now presented as something of a "man you love to hate" figure in the British tabloid press because of his perceived arrogance and for his singularly unconventional sense of style. In boxing circles he enjoyed even less popularity, having once referred to the sport as a 'mug's game' on national television (This was a selective quote – Eubank had actually been discussing the seedier side of the sport, such as the beatings taken by journeyman fighters for small sums of money, or boxers that were lied to and ripped off by promoters).

Now the holder of a second title, Eubank relinquished his middleweight title and concentrated on defending his new crown at the higher weight of 12 st. After the Watson tragedy Eubank never again showed any desire to knock opponents out, preferring to retain his title through points victories. He made successful defences against "Sugarboy" Malinga, the American quartet of John Jarvis, Ron Essett, Tony Thornton and former World Champion Lindell Holmes, as well as Juan Carlos Giminez Ferreyra and a draw with fellow Briton Ray Close.

==== Eubank vs. Benn II ====
Nigel Benn moved up to super middleweight and became WBC champion. The pair agreed to meet in a WBC/WBO unification rematch. In 1993 the rivals would engage in another contest named 'Judgement Day' and fought an exciting contest – albeit less brutal than their first – to a draw. Don King had negotiated the contracts so that he would own both the winner and the loser of Eubank v Benn 2. Barry Hearn claimed that, as a draw was not written into the contract, Eubank was free to sign a new deal with him instead of King. He did – and Benn also did not sign for King, on the same pretext.

Following the Benn fight, Eubank went on to defeat Graciano Rocchigiani of Germany, the undefeated former IBF super-middleweight title holder. After a split points victory over Ray Close, in the King's Hall Belfast, Eubank signed an eight-fight £10-million deal with Sky Sports for contests in South Africa, Manchester, London and Millstreet. Eubank made five further successful defences, beating British world title contenders Henry Wharton and Sam Storey as well as unbeaten Dan Schommer and Mauricio Amaral Costa.

==== Eubank vs. Collins ====
In March 1995, however, Eubank lost his title to Irishman Steve Collins, by unanimous decision.

The film One Night in Millstreet is about the 1995 fight with Collins.

Eubank won an eliminator for his old title against Jose Ignacio Barruetabena, as well as a win over Bruno Ruben Godoy. A rematch with Collins took place in Cork, Ireland, and Eubank lost again by a surprisingly narrow split decision. He announced his retirement from the ring in October 1995. He made a quick comeback in 1996, however, defeating Luis Dionisio Barrera and Camilo Alarcon.

==== Eubank vs. Calzaghe ====
After Steve Collins withdrew from his WBO super-middleweight title defence against Joe Calzaghe and unexpectedly retired in October 1997, Calzaghe was matched against Eubank for the vacant title with 11 days' notice. Eubank had been scheduled to box at light-heavyweight on the undercard. Eubank was knocked down twice and lost on points to Calzaghe, but saw his popularity rise as a result of managing to finish the fight against his more fancied opponent.

=== Cruiserweight ===
==== Eubank vs. Thompson ====
Eubank then added 20 lbs in weight and challenged Britain's Carl Thompson for the WBO cruiserweight title. Eubank floored Thompson in the fourth round but, as in the first Steve Collins fight, failed to press home his advantage. The fight went the distance, with Thompson's strength and durability eventually telling in the later rounds. Thompson won by unanimous decision, but the closeness of the fight was reflected in the scoring, with two of the three judges giving the fight to Thompson by a single point.

==== Eubank vs. Thompson II ====
A rematch was quickly arranged for three months later and they again fought for the WBO cruiserweight championship in what turned out to be Eubank's last fight. Eubank had the better of the fight early in the rematch, but the short rest between the bouts came back to haunt him as his left eye that was damaged in the first fight rapidly began to swell. The fight was stopped at the end of the ninth round, when Eubank's left eye closed completely from swelling. At the time he was ahead on the scorecards. It was the only stoppage loss of Eubank's career spanning three weight divisions, 30 pounds and 13 years as professional.

=== Retirement ===
Eubank finished his career with a record of 45 wins (23 KOs), five losses, and two draws.

== Legacy ==
Eubank is credited for his bravery in the ring, in which he was able to take considerable amounts of punishment from power punchers en route to his victories and defeats, and for this he is said to have a "granite" chin. He is also known for his heel-like elitist persona: Speaking and dressing like an upper-class elite, vaulting over the ring ropes as an entrance, but also the art of mental warfare, notably against Nigel Benn for their first bout.

== Career beyond boxing ==
Throughout his successful years and beyond, Eubank developed a reputation for eccentricity. In a poll published by BBC Homes and Antiques magazine in January 2006, Eubank was voted the second most eccentric star (after Björk). Speaking with a lisp and in affected upper-class tones; dressing as a stereotypically upper-class Englishman (in jodhpurs, bowler hat and riding boots; sporting a monocle) and carrying a silver-tipped cane, such affectations have provoked criticism in tabloid newspapers. However, in 1991 and 1993 he won Britain's Best Dressed Man award, given by the Menswear Association of Great Britain.

His collection of vehicles included a customised Harley-Davidson and a huge American Peterbilt 379 truck cab – the largest lorry in Europe. At one time he owned the only Hummer in Britain.

In the early 1990s, Eubank was caricatured as a puppet on Spitting Image. He featured on the front cover of Esquire for the April 1992 edition. He was mentioned in a scene of I'm Alan Partridge, in which the title character desperately tries to think of ideas for a new television show, one of which is entitled Youth Hosteling with Chris Eubank. He has featured in television advertisements (commercials) for Nescafé, Royal Mail, McDonald's, Jaffa Cakes and Orbit, and has modelled for Vivienne Westwood and Versace.

Eubank purchased the lord of the manor rights in Brighton at auction in 1996 and used the ancient right of this position to appoint a town crier in addition to the town crier employed by the local authority. In 1994 he took over a prime site in the city, which he called 'Buckingham Place'. He knocked down the interior whilst keeping the grade II façade intact and built 69 flats for the homeless, using £1,250,000 of his own money. The building was later sold for redevelopment in 2000.

In 1996, Eubank was the guest presenter on Top of the Pops. In 1999, he launched the Dreamcast and in the same year, he appeared in his truck in the music video for the song "Turn Around" by Phats & Small. He also had his own show on Talk Radio called Eubank's People. Guests included Linford Christie, John Fashanu, Lennox Lewis, and Naseem Hamed.

In 2001, he appeared in the first series of the reality television show Celebrity Big Brother on Channel 4, where he was the first ever celebrity to be evicted from the house.

In 2002, Eubank was the subject of a Louis Theroux documentary entitled When Louis Met...Chris Eubank, in which Theroux and his camera crew accompanied Eubank for a period. In 2003, the Eubanks invited television cameras to follow their lives for nine months; the resulting show, At Home with the Eubanks, was broadcast on Five.

During Michael Watson's recovery from his near-fatal injury during their bout in 1991, Watson and Eubank became friends, with Eubank accompanying Watson for the final mile of the 2003 London Marathon, which Watson – still showing physical damage from the fight and taking more than six days – completed to raise money for charity.

In 2006, Eubank was sacked by his own public relations advisor, Richard Hillgrove, for being "too eccentric".

In 2015, Eubank took part in the 2015 series of I'm a Celebrity...Get Me Out of Here!. He lasted 17 days and finished in ninth place.

In 2019, Eubank appeared alongside his son Chris Eubank Jr., on Series 1 of Celebrity Gogglebox. They re-appeared in Series 3 in 2021.

In 2021, Eubank appeared as a guest on Piers Morgan's Life Stories.

In April 2023 he was a contestant in the Channel 4 reality television series, Scared of the Dark.

Eubank is credited as appearing in the film One Night in Millstreet. In an interview at the time of release for the film Eubank praised cult-leader Tony Quinn.

=== Bankruptcy ===
In November 2009, Eubank was declared bankrupt, owing £1.3 million in taxes.

=== Anti-war activism ===
On 14 October 2003, Eubank was intercepted by police whilst driving around Parliament Square, Westminster, in his truck, which displayed the message "Tony Blair! Military occupation causes terrorism". He completed a number of circuits before he was arrested. On 22 February 2007, Eubank was arrested outside Horse Guards Parade in Whitehall for a suspected breach of the peace after driving through central London in his truck, which was emblazoned with a message condemning Tony Blair for sending Prince Harry to Iraq. The banner read "Blair – don't send our young prince to your catastrophic illegal war, to make it look plausible!" On 23 May 2007, he was charged with making an unlawful anti-war protest after parking his seven-ton truck outside Downing Street. On 16 November 2007, he failed to turn up at court, so an arrest warrant was issued, and he was fined.

=== Ambassadorship ===
In October 2005, Eubank was appointed as the first ambassador for gambling charity GamCare, to support and encourage responsible gambling.

=== Tailored suit designer ===
Known for his unique sense of style, Eubank has won the Britain's Best Dressed Man many times. In 2010, Eubank, once a regular customer, started designing tailored suits for Cad and the Dandy, a Savile Row bespoke tailoring company.

=== Youth Hostelling with Chris Eubank ===
On 19 August 2015, a spoof trailer was made available for Youth Hostelling with Chris Eubank in association with Hostelworld, detailing Eubank's journey around Britain in an effort to learn more about youth hostels. The joke originates from the comedy show I'm Alan Partridge, in which the title character pitches a selection of ideas for television shows.

== Personal life ==
Eubank and his first wife, Karron (married 23 December 1990 in Brighton), had four children (Christopher Livingston Eubank Jr., born on 18 September 1989; Sebastian Sabali Eubank (18 July 1991– 9 July 2021); Emily Eubank, born on 19 April 1994; and Joseph Eubank, born on 23 October 1996) and have over the years starred in various television programmes. Eubank also has an elder son, Nathanael Wilson, born August 1988. Eubank is the cousin of English singer Mica Paris. His son Sebastian, also a professional boxer, died aged 29 on 9 July 2021 in Dubai.

In 1992, Eubank was involved in a fatal collision when he lost control of his car on the London to Brighton road; the car came off the road and killed a building site worker. He was convicted of driving without due care and attention, fined £250 plus £1,450 costs, and had six penalty points added to his driving licence.

In August 2005, Karron petitioned for divorce from Eubank. Also in 2005, Eubank was convicted of taking a vehicle without consent. He had driven a beer lorry which was being unloaded away from a place where he considered it to be causing an unreasonable obstruction. In 2014, Eubank married his manager Claire Geary, but the couple divorced in 2017.

In 2015, Eubank adopted the nickname of his deceased father, "English", to privately perpetuate his memory and to publicly differentiate himself from the budding boxing career of his son Chris Jr.

In 2021, Eubank was prosecuted after he was filmed by CyclingMikey driving through a red light.

== Professional boxing record ==
52 fights	45 wins	5 losses
By knockout	23	1
By decision	22	4
Draws	2	

No.	Result	Record	Opponent	Type	Round, time	Date	Location	Notes
52	Loss	45–5–2	Carl Thompson	RTD	9 (12), 3:00	18 Jul 1998	Ponds Forge, Sheffield, England	For WBO junior-heavyweight title
51	Loss	45–4–2	Carl Thompson	UD	12	18 Apr 1998	NYNEX Arena, Manchester, England	For WBO junior-heavyweight title
50	Loss	45–3–2	Joe Calzaghe	UD	12	11 Oct 1997	Sheffield Arena, Sheffield, England	For vacant WBO super-middleweight title
49	Win	45–2–2	Camilo Alarcon	KO	4 (10)	27 Mar 1997	Aviation Club Tennis Centre, Dubai, UAE	
48	Win	44–2–2	Luis Dionisio Barrera	KO	5 (10), 0:42	19 Oct 1996	Stadium Indoor Halls Complex, Cairo, Egypt	
47	Loss	43–2–2	Steve Collins	SD	12	9 Sep 1995	Páirc Uí Chaoimh, Cork, Ireland	For WBO super-middleweight title
46	Win	43–1–2	Jose Ignacio Barruetabena	KO	1 (10), 0:55	29 Jul 1995	Whitley Bay, England	
45	Win	42–1–2	Bruno Ruben Godoy	TKO	1 (10)	27 May 1995	King's Hall, Belfast, Northern Ireland	
44	Loss	41–1–2	Steve Collins	UD	12	18 Mar 1995	Green Glens Arena, Millstreet, Ireland	Lost WBO super-middleweight title
43	Win	41–0–2	Henry Wharton	UD	12	10 Dec 1994	G-Mex Centre, Manchester, England	Retained WBO super-middleweight title
42	Win	40–0–2	Dan Schommer	UD	12	15 Oct 1994	Superbowl, Sun City, South Africa	Retained WBO super-middleweight title
41	Win	39–0–2	Sam Storey	TKO	7 (12), 1:00	27 Aug 1994	International Arena, Cardiff, Wales	Retained WBO super-middleweight title
40	Win	38–0–2	Mauricio Amaral	UD	12	9 Jul 1994	Earls Court Exhibition Centre, London, England	Retained WBO super-middleweight title
39	Win	37–0–2	Ray Close	SD	12	21 May 1994	King's Hall, Belfast, Northern Ireland	Retained WBO super-middleweight title
38	Win	36–0–2	Graciano Rocchigiani	UD	12	5 Feb 1994	Deutschlandhalle, Berlin, Germany	Retained WBO super-middleweight title
37	Draw	35–0–2	Nigel Benn	SD	12	9 Oct 1993	Old Trafford, Manchester, England	Retained WBO super-middleweight title; For WBC super-middleweight title
36	Draw	35–0–1	Ray Close	SD	12	15 May 1993	Exhibition and Conference Centre, Glasgow, Scotland	Retained WBO super-middleweight title
35	Win	35–0	Lindell Holmes	UD	12	20 Feb 1993	Earls Court Exhibition Centre, London, England	Retained WBO super-middleweight title
34	Win	34–0	Juan Carlos Gimenez	UD	12	28 Nov 1992	G-Mex Centre, Manchester, England	Retained WBO super-middleweight title
33	Win	33–0	Tony Thornton	UD	12	19 Sep 1992	Exhibition and Conference Centre, Glasgow, Scotland	Retained WBO super-middleweight title
32	Win	32–0	Ron Essett	UD	12	27 Jun 1992	Quinta do Lago Hotel, Almancil, Portugal	Retained WBO super-middleweight title
31	Win	31–0	John Jarvis	KO	3 (12), 1:50	25 Apr 1992	G-Mex Centre, Manchester, England	Retained WBO super-middleweight title
30	Win	30–0	Thulani Malinga	SD	12	1 Feb 1992	National Exhibition Centre, Birmingham, England	Retained WBO super-middleweight title
29	Win	29–0	Michael Watson	TKO	12 (12), 0:29	21 Sep 1991	White Hart Lane, London, England	Won vacant WBO super-middleweight title
28	Win	28–0	Michael Watson	MD	12	22 Jun 1991	Earls Court Exhibition Centre, London, England	Retained WBO middleweight title
27	Win	27–0	Gary Stretch	TKO	6 (12), 1:56	18 Apr 1991	Olympia Grand Hall, London, England	Retained WBO middleweight title
26	Win	26–0	Dan Sherry	TD	10 (12), 2:11	23 Feb 1991	Brighton Centre, Brighton, England	Retained WBO middleweight title; Split TD: Sherry unable to continue after a headbutt by Eubank
25	Win	25–0	Nigel Benn	TKO	9 (12), 2:56	18 Nov 1990	National Exhibition Centre, Birmingham, England	Won WBO middleweight title
24	Win	24–0	Reginaldo Dos Santos	KO	1 (10), 0:20	22 Sep 1990	Royal Albert Hall, London, England	
23	Win	23–0	Kid Milo	TKO	8 (12)	5 Sep 1990	Brighton Centre, Brighton, England	Retained WBC International middleweight title
22	Win	22–0	Eduardo Domingo Contreras	UD	12	25 Apr 1990	Brighton Centre, Brighton, England	Retained WBC International middleweight title
21	Win	21–0	Hugo Antonio Corti	TKO	8 (12), 0:46	6 Mar 1990	York Hall, London, England	Won WBC International middleweight title
20	Win	20–0	Denys Cronin	TKO	3 (8), 1:15	16 Jan 1990	STAR Centre, Cardiff, Wales	
19	Win	19–0	Jose Carlos da Silva	KO	6 (8)	20 Dec 1989	Kirkby Leisure Centre, Liverpool, England	
18	Win	18–0	Johnny Melfah	KO	4 (8)	5 Nov 1989	Royal Albert Hall, London, England	
17	Win	17–0	Jean-Noel Camara	TKO	2 (8)	24 Oct 1989	York Hall, London, England	
16	Win	16–0	Ron Malek	TKO	5 (8), 1:20	4 Oct 1989	Festival Hall, Basildon, England	
15	Win	15–0	Les Wisniewski	TKO	2 (8), 1:07	28 Jun 1989	International Centre, Brentwood, England	
14	Win	14–0	Randy Smith	PTS	10	26 May 1989	York Hall, London, England	
13	Win	13–0	Franky Moro	PTS	8	1 Mar 1989	York Hall, London, England	
12	Win	12–0	Anthony Logan	PTS	8	8 Feb 1989	Royal Albert Hall, London, England	
11	Win	11–0	Simon Collins	TKO	4 (8), 2:22	31 Jan 1989	York Hall, London, England	
10	Win	10–0	Steve Aquilina	TKO	4 (6), 2:40	18 May 1988	Guildhall, Portsmouth, England	
9	Win	9–0	Greg George	TKO	5 (8), 1:25	4 May 1988	Olympia Grand Hall, London, England	
8	Win	8–0	Michael Justin	TKO	5 (8)	26 Apr 1988	Town Hall, Hove, England	
7	Win	7–0	Winston Burnett	PTS	6	7 Mar 1988	Town Hall, Hove, England	
6	Win	6–0	Darren Parker	TKO	1 (6)	15 Feb 1988	Effingham Park Country Club, Copthorne, England	
5	Win	5–0	James Canty	UD	4	25 Mar 1987	Resorts Casino Hotel, Atlantic City, New Jersey, US	
4	Win	4–0	Eric Holland	UD	4	25 Feb 1986	Tropicana, Atlantic City, New Jersey, US	
3	Win	3–0	Mike Bagwell	MD	4	8 Jan 1986	Broadway by the Bay Theater, Atlantic City, New Jersey, US	
2	Win	2–0	Kenny Cannido	UD	4	7 Nov 1985	Atlantis Hotel and Casino, Atlantic City, New Jersey, US	
1	Win	1–0	Tim Brown	UD	4	3 Oct 1985	Sands, Atlantic City, New Jersey, US	

== See also ==
- News media phone hacking scandal reference lists

== Notes ==
Sporting positions
Regional boxing titles
Preceded by Antonio Corti	WBC International middleweight champion 6 March 1990 – November 1990; Vacated	Vacant Title next held by Rubén Darío Cabral
World boxing titles
Preceded by Nigel Benn	WBO middleweight champion 18 November 1990 – 17 July 1991; Vacated	Vacant Title next held by Gerald McClellan
Vacant Title last held by Thomas Hearns	WBO super-middleweight champion 21 September 1991 – 18 March 1995	Succeeded by Steve Collins
Awards
Previous: Mike Tyson vs. Buster Douglas; Round 8	KO Magazine Round of the Year vs. Michael Watson II; Round 11; 1991	Next: Evander Holyfield vs. Riddick Bowe; Round 10
