= Steve Collins =

Irish boxer (born 1964)

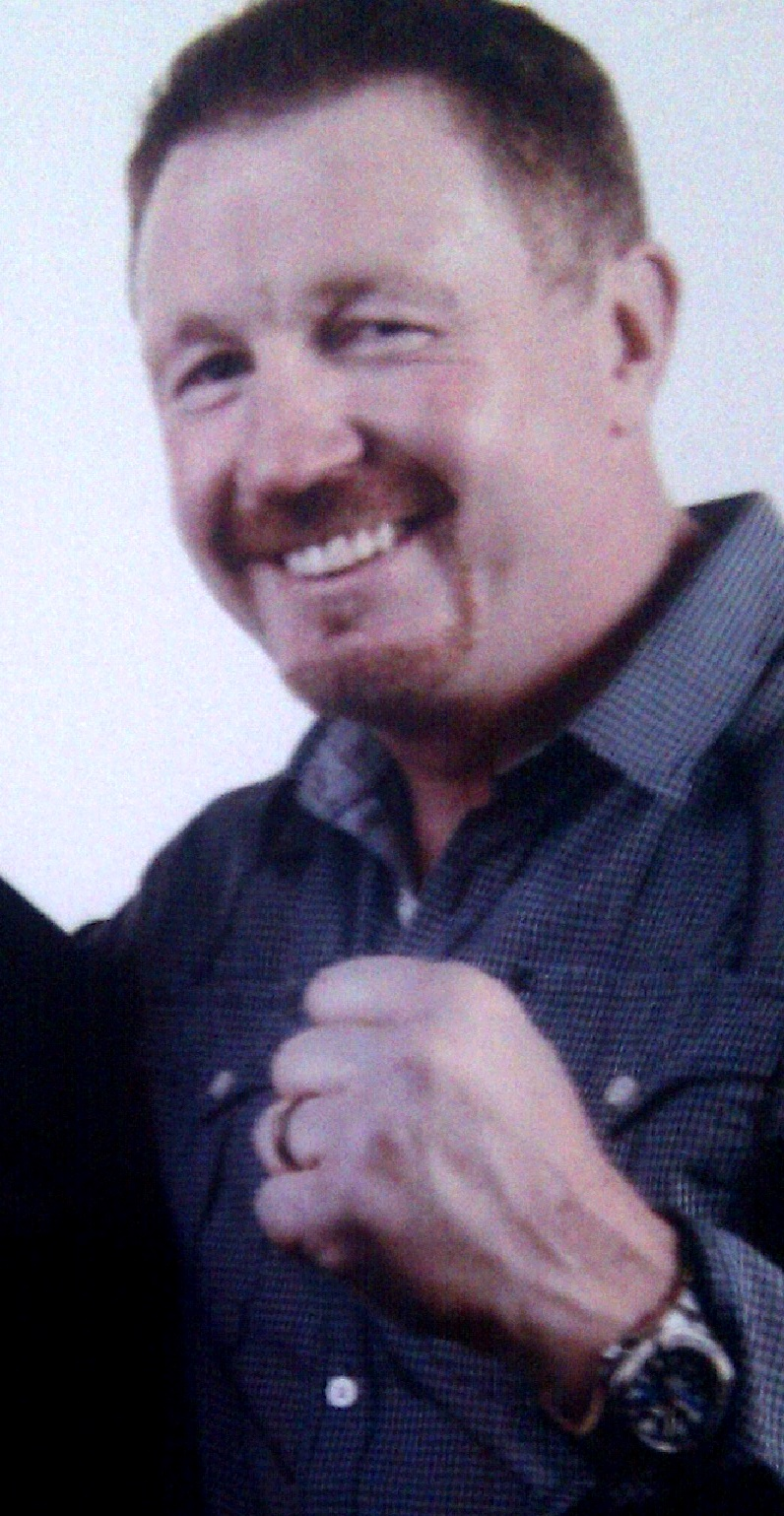
- Collins in 2010

Personal information
- Nickname: Celtic Warrior
- Born: Stephen Collins; 21 July 1964 (age 62) Cabra, Dublin, Ireland
- Height: 6 ft (183 cm)
- Weight: Middleweight; Super-middleweight

Boxing career
- Reach: 71 in (180 cm)
- Stance: Orthodox

Boxing record
- Total fights: 39
- Wins: 36
- Win by KO: 21
- Losses: 3

Stephen Collins (born 21 July 1964) is an Irish former professional boxer who competed from 1986 to 1997. He is a world champion in two weight classes, having held the World Boxing Organization (WBO) middleweight title from 1994 to 1995, and the WBO super-middleweight title from 1995 to 1997. At regional level, he held the Irish and USBA middleweight titles between 1988 and 1995; and challenged once for the European title in 1992.

== Professional career ==
=== Early career ===
Steve Collins won 26 Irish titles as an amateur before turning professional in Boston, Massachusetts (USA) in October 1986. Collins worked out of Petronelli Brothers gym in Brockton, Massachusetts alongside Marvin Hagler. His debut fight was against Julio Mercado on the undercard of a bill that featured Irish Americans; his future trainer Freddie Roach and the future Fight of the Year winner Micky Ward. Collins beat Mercado by way of knockout in the third round.

In Boston, Massachusetts in 1988, he defeated former Olympian and British Super Middleweight champion Sam Storey to win the Irish middleweight title, then defeated world No. 5, Kevin Watts to win the USBA middleweight title. After reaching 16–0, Collins stepped in as a substitute in a WBA middleweight title fight after Michael Watson was injured in training, and fought 12 rounds against Mike McCallum in Boston in 1990. Collins was supported by a large crowd of Irish Americans as he battled the champion McCallum, with the fight being close early on before McCallum started to tire as Collins gained momentum in the later stages to bring a close finish at the end of 12 exciting rounds. McCallum got the win by unanimous decision.

In 1992, Collins lost a majority decision to Reggie Johnson in a closely contested slugfest for the vacant WBA middleweight title (which had been stripped from McCallum because he signed to fight IBF champion James Toney). Collins then lost by split decision to Sumbu Kalambay for the European title in Italy, before beating Gerhard Botes of South Africa to win the WBA Penta-Continental middleweight title in 1993.

=== WBO middleweight champion ===
Collins then moved to Belfast under the management of Barney Eastwood before basing himself in England where he joined Barry Hearn's Matchroom Boxing. Alongside him was Paul "Silky" Jones, his sparring partner and good friend who later went on to become WBO light-middleweight title holder. Collins was trained by Freddie King in the Romford training camp.

In May 1994, Collins finally won a world title by defeating Chris Pyatt by stoppage in five rounds to become the WBO middleweight champion. Early in 1995, Collins relinquished this title without a defence as he was having difficulty making the 160lbs middleweight limit.

In March 1995, Chris Eubank (41–0–2) had been scheduled to have a third WBO super-middleweight title fight against Ray Close. Eubank and Close had two fights over the previous two years (their first fight a draw, and their second fight a narrow split decision win for Eubank), but Close was forced to withdraw from their scheduled third fight after failing an MRI brain scan. Collins then stepped into Close's place, moving up to super-middleweight to take on Eubank.

=== WBO super-middleweight champion ===
Collins defeated the then unbeaten long-reigning champion Chris Eubank in Millstreet, County Cork, Ireland, in March 1995, by unanimous decision (115–111, 116–114, 114–113), to win the WBO super-middleweight title. Collins had enlisted the help of Tony Quinn, and they led the press to believe that Collins would be hypnotised for the fight, which noticeably unsettled Eubank. True to form, Collins sat in his corner and did not move, listening to headphones during Eubank's ring entrance. Collins knocked Eubank down in the eighth round, and was well ahead on the scorecards at the end of Round 9, but Eubank finished the fight strongly as he tried to save his unbeaten record and knocked Collins down in the tenth round, coming close to a stoppage. Eubank was unable to finish the job, and Collins held on for victory.

The film One Night in Millstreet is about the March 1995 fight with Eubank.

In their September 1995 rematch in Cork, Collins performed brilliantly, changing his usual fighting style by adopting wild, brawling tactics throughout which Eubank really struggled to deal with. Despite most TV pundits and commentators giving Collins a wide points victory with scorecards in the region of 117–111 and 118–110, the three judges saw the fight very differently with Collins only winning by a close split decision, 115–113, 115–113 and 114–115. Collins successfully defended his WBO super-middleweight title seven times, including two fights against Nigel Benn in 1996.

In the summer of 1997, Collins reportedly stated in the press that he had no motivation left, as he had spent the best part of his career chasing Roy Jones Jr. for a fight that had been promised to him many times. Collins is reported to have stated in Boxing World that he had spent so long chasing Roy Jones Jr. that money was no longer important; that he would "fight him in a phone box in front of two men and a dog", but the bout never materialized. A WBO super-middleweight title fight against Joe Calzaghe was agreed for October 1997, but Collins got injured 10 days before the scheduled fight, with Collins then making a statement saying that fighting Calzaghe would do nothing to satisfy the desire he had for fighting Jones.

Collins then added he wanted to retire on a high note with a good pay day, "Joe is a good up-and-coming kid, but he wouldn't fill a parish church". As Collins couldn't get the fight with Jones, Collins decided to retire.

In 1999, Collins announced his decision to come out of retirement to fight Roy Jones Jr. Controversy surrounded the proposed fight, as WBC and WBA light heavyweight champion Jones decided to fight the IBF light heavyweight champion and old Collins foe Reggie Johnson (which Jones won by a shutout 120–106 on all three judges' scorecards). In training, Collins collapsed during a sparring session; although tests and a brain scan could not find any problems, Collins decided that it was a warning to make him stop boxing, and he retired for a second time.

Collins finished his career with a record of 39 fights, 36 wins (21 knockouts), and 3 losses.

He was inducted into the Atlantic City Boxing Hall of Fame in 2025.

== Retirement ==
Collins has not entirely faded from the spotlight since his retirement. In 1998 he appeared in the film Lock, Stock and Two Smoking Barrels as a boxing gym bouncer. In 1999 he made a cameo appearance in "Sweetest Thing", a music video by U2. On 15 January 2013, at the age of 48, Collins announced plans to fight Roy Jones Jr. He went on to appear in a number of exhibition bouts in preparation for the proposed Jones fight.

In 2014, Collins joined the British Army Reserves, and in 2017, transferred to 253 Provost Company of the 4th Regiment Royal Military Police in London where he had been living for the previous 20 years. He gained promotion to Lance Corporal and qualified as an army boxing coach.

Collins appears in the film One Night in Millstreet.

== Professional boxing record ==
39 fights	36 wins	3 losses
By knockout	21	0
By decision	15	3

No.	Result	Record	Opponent	Type	Round, time	Date	Location	Notes
39	Win	36–3	Craig Cummings	TKO	3 (12), 1:17	5 Jul 1997	Kelvin Hall, Glasgow, Scotland	Retained WBO super-middleweight title
38	Win	35–3	Frederic Seillier	TKO	5 (12), 2:20	8 Feb 1997	London Arena, London, England	Retained WBO super-middleweight title
37	Win	34–3	Nigel Benn	RTD	6 (12), 3:00	9 Nov 1996	NYNEX Arena, Manchester, England	Retained WBO super-middleweight title
36	Win	33–3	Nigel Benn	TKO	4 (12), 2:44	6 Jul 1996	NYNEX Arena, Manchester, England	Retained WBO super-middleweight title
35	Win	32–3	Neville Brown	TKO	11 (12), 0:54	9 Mar 1996	Green Glens Arena, Millstreet, Ireland	Retained WBO super-middleweight title
34	Win	31–3	Cornelius Carr	UD	12	25 Nov 1995	Point Theatre, Dublin, Ireland	Retained WBO super-middleweight title
33	Win	30–3	Chris Eubank	SD	12	9 Sep 1995	Páirc Uí Chaoimh, Cork, Ireland	Retained WBO super-middleweight title
32	Win	29–3	Chris Eubank	UD	12	18 Mar 1995	Green Glens Arena, Millstreet, Ireland	Won WBO super-middleweight title
31	Win	28–3	Chris Pyatt	TKO	5 (12), 2:27	11 May 1994	Ponds Forge, Sheffield, England	Won WBO middleweight title
30	Win	27–3	Paul Wesley	PTS	8	9 Feb 1994	Brentwood Centre, Brentwood, England	
29	Win	26–3	Johnny Melfah	TKO	4 (8)	22 Jan 1994	King's Hall, Belfast, Northern Ireland	
28	Win	25–3	Wayne Ellis	KO	9 (10)	30 Nov 1993	Cardiff, Wales	
27	Win	24–3	Gerhard Botes	TKO	7 (12)	26 Jun 1993	Earls Court Exhibition Centre, London, England	Won vacant WBA Penta-Continental middleweight title
26	Win	23–3	Ian Strudwick	TKO	7 (10)	20 Feb 1993	Earls Court Exhibition Centre, London, England	
25	Win	22–3	Johnny Melfah	TKO	3 (8), 2:48	6 Feb 1993	Cardiff, Wales	
24	Loss	21–3	Sumbu Kalambay	SD	12	22 Oct 1992	Verbania, Italy	For European middleweight title
23	Loss	21–2	Reggie Johnson	MD	12	22 Apr 1992	Brendan Byrne Arena, East Rutherford, New Jersey, US	For vacant WBA middleweight title
22	Win	21–1	Danny Morgan	KO	3	11 Dec 1991	National Stadium, Dublin, Ireland	
21	Win	20–1	Jean-Noel Camara	KO	3	25 May 1991	Salle Marcel Cerdan, Brest, France	
20	Win	19–1	Kenny Snow	TKO	3 (10), 3:00	11 May 1991	Maysfield Leisure Centre, Belfast, Northern Ireland	
19	Win	18–1	Eddie Hall	UD	10	24 Nov 1990	Boston Garden, Boston, Massachusetts, US	
18	Win	17–1	Fermin Chirino	TKO	6 (10)	16 Aug 1990	Sheraton Hotel, Boston, Massachusetts, US	
17	Loss	16–1	Mike McCallum	UD	12	3 Feb 1990	Hynes Convention Center, Boston, Massachusetts, US	For WBA middleweight title
16	Win	16–0	Roberto Rosiles	TKO	9 (10), 0:52	21 Nov 1989	Showboat Hotel and Casino, Las Vegas, Nevada, US	
15	Win	15–0	Tony Thornton	MD	12	16 Jul 1989	Broadway by the Bay Theater, Atlantic City, New Jersey, US	Retained USBA middleweight title
14	Win	14–0	Kevin Watts	UD	12	9 May 1989	Resorts International Casino, Atlantic City, New Jersey, US	Won USBA middleweight title
13	Win	13–0	Paul McPeek	TKO	9 (10)	7 Feb 1989	Trump's Castle, Atlantic City, New Jersey, US	
12	Win	12–0	Jesse Lanton	UD	8	10 Dec 1988	Boys Club, Salem, New Hampshire, US	
11	Win	11–0	Muhammad Shabazz	TKO	4 (10)	22 Oct 1988	Boys Club, Salem, New Hampshire, US	
10	Win	10–0	Michael Dale	UD	8	30 Jul 1988	Romuva Park, Brockton, Massachusetts, US	
9	Win	9–0	Lester Yarbrough	UD	10	26 May 1988	Boston Park Plaza Hotel & Towers, Boston, Massachusetts, US	
8	Win	8–0	Sam Storey	UD	10	18 Mar 1988	Boston Garden, Boston, Massachusetts, US	Won Irish middleweight title
7	Win	7–0	Bennie Sims	UD	8	9 Dec 1987	Broadway by the Bay Theater, Atlantic City, New Jersey, US	
6	Win	6–0	Mike Williams	UD	6	20 Nov 1987	Resorts International Casino, Atlantic City, New Jersey, US	
5	Win	5–0	Harold Souther	UD	8	29 Oct 1987	Memorial Auditorium, Lowell, Massachusetts, US	
4	Win	4–0	Richard Holmes	KO	1	10 Oct 1987	Attleboro, Massachusetts, US	
3	Win	3–0	Richard Holloway	KO	2 (4)	20 Dec 1986	Strand Theatre, Boston, Massachusetts, US	
2	Win	2–0	Mike Bonislawski	UD	4	27 Nov 1986	Strand Theatre, Boston, Massachusetts, US	
1	Win	1–0	Julio Mercado	KO	3 (4), 1:55	24 Oct 1986	Memorial Auditorium, Lowell, Massachusetts, US	

== Titles in boxing ==
=== Major world titles ===
- WBO middleweight champion (160 lbs)
- WBO super-middleweight champion (168 lbs)

=== Regional/International titles ===
- Irish middleweight champion (160 lbs)
- USBA middleweight champion (160 lbs)
- WBA Penta-Continental middleweight champion (160 lbs)

Sporting positions
Regional boxing titles
Preceded by Sam Storey	Irish middleweight champion 18 March 1988 – March 1995; Vacated	Vacant Title next held by Darren Sweeney
Preceded by Kevin Watts	USBA middleweight champion 9 May 1989 – February 1990; Vacated	Vacant Title next held by Reggie Johnson
World boxing titles
Preceded by Chris Pyatt	WBO middleweight champion 11 May 1994 – March 1995; Vacated	Vacant Title next held by Lonnie Bradley
Preceded by Chris Eubank	WBO super-middleweight champion 18 March 1995 – 5 July 1997; Retired	Vacant Title next held by Joe Calzaghe
