= Wayne Ellis =

British boxer (1968–2018)

Personal information
- Nationality: Welsh
- Born: Wayne Ellis; 18 July 1968 Llanedeyrn, Wales, United Kingdom
- Died: 5 January 2018 (aged 49) Cardiff, Wales, United Kingdom
- Height: 6 ft 0 in (1.83 m)
- Weight: Middleweight

Boxing career
- Stance: Orthodox

Boxing record
- Total fights: 19
- Wins: 14
- Win by KO: 7
- Losses: 4
- Draws: 1
- No contests: 0

Wayne Ellis (18 July 1968 - 5 January 2018) was a middleweight boxer. A promising amateur he turned professional in 1988 and won the Wales Middleweight belt in 1992.

== Boxing career ==
Ellis grew up in Llanedeyrn in Cardiff, and attended Llanedeyrn High School where he excelled as a sportsman. Ellis captained both the schools rugby and football teams before taking up boxing at the age of sixteen. He collected several junior honors before winning the Welsh ABA light-middleweight title as a senior in 1987. In 1988 he challenged for the British ABA Light-middleweight title, defeating reigning champion Neville Brown on his way to the final. He then faced Willie Neil in the final, whom he beat on points despite being knocked down in the first round. With the British ABA title Ellis believed he would be the first choice for the light-middleweight position on the British team to the Seoul Olympics. The selectors wanted to take another look at Brown and Birmingham based fighter Richie Woodhall. Ellis reacted by turning professional, ruling himself out of the Olympics.

Ellis took on Frank Warren as his manager and former Welsh ABA finalist Tony Alsop as his trainer on a three-year deal. Ellis' first professional fight was on 25 June 1988, appearing on the undercard to the Barry McGuigan vs Francisco Tomas Da Cruz fight at Kenilworth Road in Luton. Ellis' opponent that night was journeyman Seamus Casey; and the fight went the full six rounds with Ellis declared winner on points decision. Over the next three years, Ellis fought another ten times, winning all but one fight, a draw with future British welterweight challenger Lindon Scarlett. With his contract with Warren expiring, Ellis switched managers, linking up with Barry Hearn.

Ellis' first fight under Hearn saw his first professional loss. Fighting against Leeds-based boxer Colin Manners, Ellis was struck and knocked down by a punch on the break. Despite Manners being reprimanded by the referee, Ellis never fully recovered and the fight was stopped at the end of the first round. Ellis came back from this defeat to win his first title when he beat Alan Richards for the vacant Welsh middleweight title on 11 February 1992. He then successfully defended his title against Mike Phillips at the Grosvenor House Hotel in London, stopping him in the seventh round via technical knockout. The win against Phillips came with a cost as Ellis as he damaged a hand in the contest, and along with a bout of glandular fever, he didn't fight again for nearly a year.

Ellis returned to the ring in July 1993 to take on Paul Busby at the National Ice Rink in Cardiff, an undercard fight to Steve Robinson defence of his WBO featherweight title. Ellis stopped Busby in the fifth round. Ellis then faced Irish fighter, Steve Collins, again in Cardiff. The fight was a disaster for Ellis, suffering nine rounds of battery from Collins, and resulting in Ellis' second professional defeat. Collins soon after moved up to super-middleweight, vacating his WBO Penta-Continental strap. This allowed Ellis a rematch with Busby for to challenge for the title. The fight, arranged for 28 June 1994 in Mayfair in London, ended controversially in the fourth round when the two boxers clashed resulting in a heavy gash to Ellis head. Ellis could not continue and the referee raised Busby's hand in victory until it was pointed out that under WBO rules the decision had to go to the scorecards. The scores to that point had Ellis ahead and he was awarded the title. A rematch was arranged and this time Busby won on points, taking the title from Ellis. By this time Ellis was struggling with the rigours of coming in at weight, and moved up to super-middleweight. His one and only fight at this weight, a challenge for the Wales super-middleweight title, ended in defeat to Darron Griffiths and Ellis promptly retired from boxing. He died on 5 January 2018 aged 49.
