= BoyleSports =

Irish betting company

BOYLESports
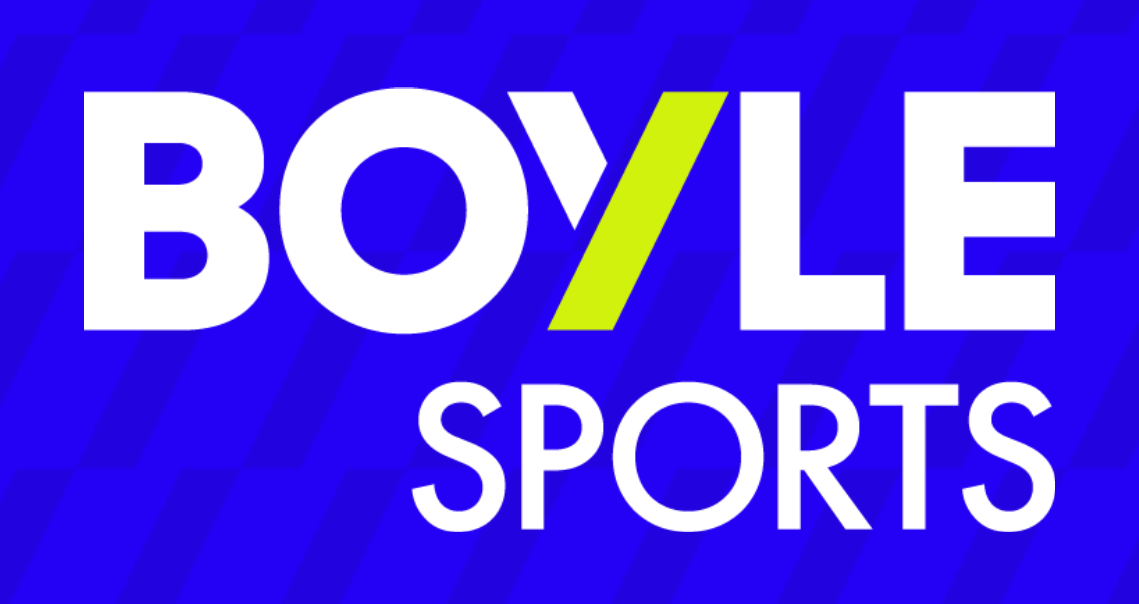
- Type: Private
- Industry: Gambling
- Founded: 1982
- Founder: John Boyle
- Headquarters: Dundalk, Ireland
- Key people: Vlad Kaltenieks (CEO); John Boyle (Chairman)
- Products: Sports betting, online casino, online poker, online bingo
- Number of employees: 2,500
- Website: www.boylesports.com

BOYLE Sports is an Irish gambling company founded in 1982. Its product offering includes sports betting, online casino, online poker, and online bingo. Business operations are led from its headquarters in Dundalk, and a satellite office in Gibraltar. As of 2025, it has over 380 retail branches throughout Ireland and the UK.

== History ==
BOYLE Sports was created by John Boyle in 1982, when he opened his first betting shop in Markethill, County Armagh, Northern Ireland. In 1989, five locations were opened in Drogheda, and in 2002, 14 new shops were opened.

The organization had 77 shops by August 2004, and opened its 100th store two years later, in 2006. In February 2011, BOYLE Sports took over 17 new shops from Celtic Bookmakers. Later that year, the company consolidated 15 William Hill shops.

In July 2017, Conor Gray became CEO after founder John Boyle assumed the role of executive chairman.

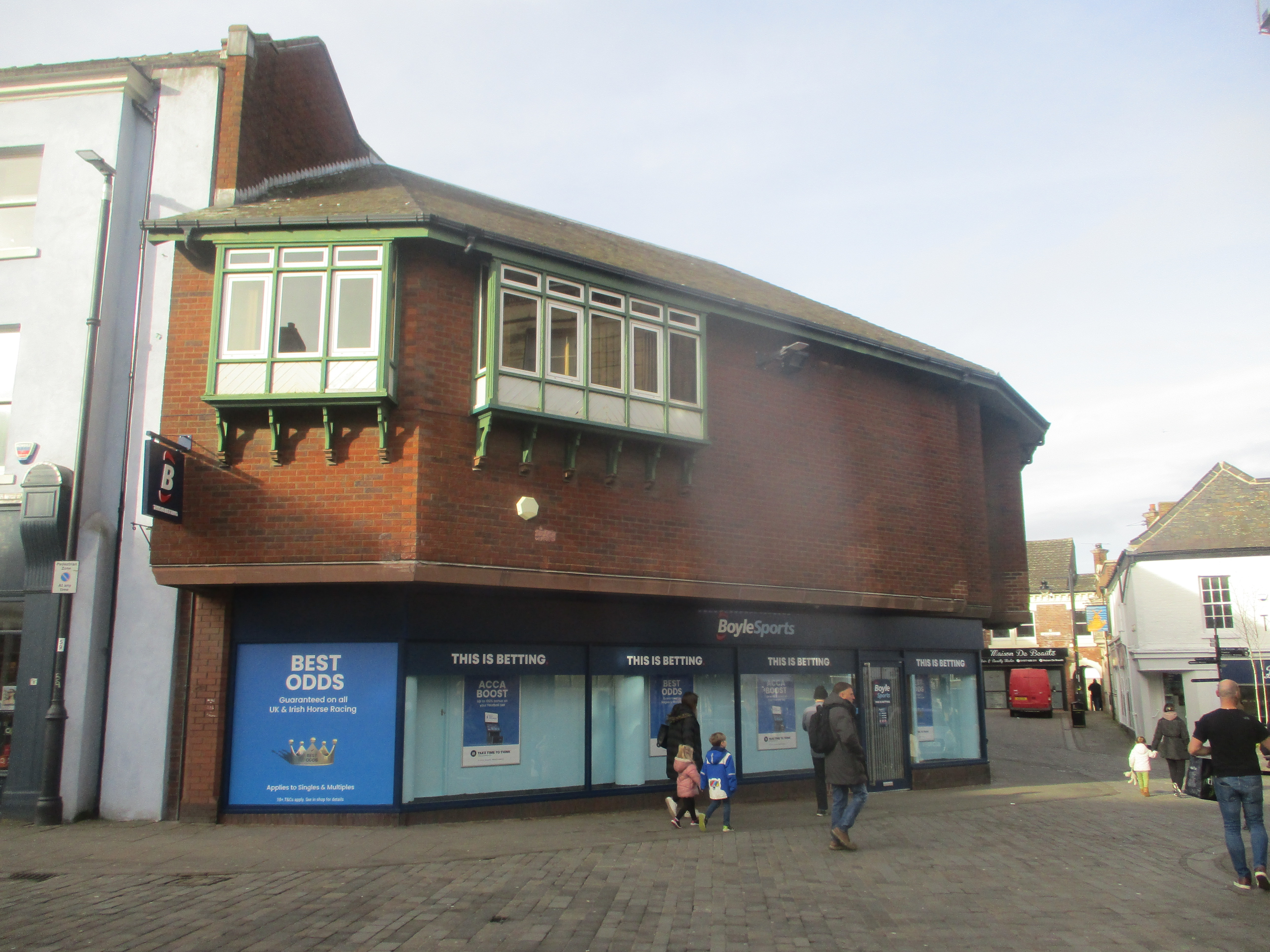
Boyle Sports branch in Pontefract, West Yorkshire.

In September 2018, BoyleSports opened their 250th shop in Kilcullen, County Kildare, and announced plans to further expand its retail and online businesses. In June 2019, BoyleSports announced they had entered the UK retail market with the acquisition of independent bookmaker Wilf Gilbert, who ran 13 betting shops in the Midlands for an undisclosed sum. In January 2020, BoyleSports expanded its operation in Northern Ireland by acquiring 33 William Hill shops, making the company Ireland's biggest retail bookmaker.

In November 2021, BOYLE Sports announced an acquisition deal with bookmakers Tully. The deal includes the acquisition of Tully's telephone betting business in addition to acquiring ten retail venues. This deal aided in maintaining BOYLE Sports positions as the largest independent betting operator in Ireland with 268 retail betting shops throughout Ireland.

In 2021, Mark Kemp, managing director of the UK Tote Group, was announced as the new CEO of BOYLE Sports following a company restructure. Former CEO Conor Gray's role was changed to commercial director. In February 2022, it was announced that Kemp would be leaving the company at the end of July 2022.

In 2023 Vlad Kaltenieks was appointed as CEO of BOYLE Sports .

== Sponsorship ==
=== Horse Racing ===
Since 2010, BOYLE Sports Champion Chase Day has run at the Punchestown Festival each year. Prize money for the feature race, the Grade 1 BoyleSports Champion Chase, increased from €140,000 to €300,000 between 2010 and 2019. Previous winners include Big Zeb, Sizing Europe, Sprinter Sacre and Un De Sceaux.

In 2014, BOYLE Sports became the headline sponsor of the Irish Grand National, which runs at Fairyhouse Racecourse each Easter Monday. In August 2016 it was announced that the prize money would be increased to €500,000. In January 2020, BoyleSports announced that they had pledged €2,000,000 in prize money to extend their sponsorship of the Irish Grand National for a further four years.

In October 2014, BOYLE Sports and Irish national broadcaster RTE announced that BoyleSports would become the sponsor of the RTE Racing programmes across TV, radio and online in a deal worth €1,000,000. In 2017 an extension of their partnership was announced.

=== Football ===
In 2007, for the 2007-08 until 2010 for the 2009-10 season, they were the front of shirt sponsor for Premier League side Sunderland

In June 2019, BOYLE Sports announced they had signed a two-season deal to become the main sponsor of EFL Championship side Birmingham City. The club stated that this was their biggest sponsorship deal in over a decade. The announcement was made at the official unveiling of the club's home kit at the Birmingham Back to Backs tourist attraction in Birmingham City Centre in a Peaky Blinders-styled launch event. In April 2021, BoyleSports announced they had extended their sponsorship deal for two more seasons with Birmingham City until 2023.

In 2020, BOYLE Sports became English Premier League side Wolverhampton Wanderers Molineux betting partner for the 2020/21 season. BoyleSports extended their partnership with Wolves for the 2021/22 season.

In August 2020, BOYLE Sports became the main sponsor of Coventry City. In 2021, Coventry City announced they had agreed to a two-year extension with BoyleSports.

In August 2021, BOYLE Sports was announced as UK and Ireland Betting Partner of English Premier League side Newcastle United.

In July 2025, BOYLE Sports was announced as a multi-year principal partnership sponsor for English Premier League side West Ham United.

=== Gaelic Football ===
In 2003, BOYLE Sports agreed to a 3-year sponsorship of the senior Louth GAA team, starting in 2004. A six-figure sum, it was a lucrative and controversial deal for the time. The Boylesports HQ being located in Dundalk, Co. Louth aided this. This sponsorship lasted until its expiry at the end of 2007.

=== Darts ===
In July 2019, BOYLE Sports announced they had agreed a deal with the Professional Darts Corporation to sponsor the BOYLE Sports World Grand Prix in the Citywest Convention Centre, running from 2019 to 2021. Speaking at the launch, Michael van Gerwen stated, "This tournament has something special. The people love it and they come out to support". The tournament is broadcast live on Sky Sports for seven nights each year. In 2020, BoyleSports were announced as the title sponsor of the 2020 Grand Slam of Darts, extending their sponsorship of PDC tournaments.

=== Greyhounds ===
BOYLE Sports became the headline sponsor in 2014 for the Irish Greyhound Derby held in Shelbourne Park every September. In 2017, an announcement was made detailing the increase in prize money from €240,000 to €300,000 for the 2018 Derby. In 2021, BoyleSports announced a new three-year extension of their sponsorship of the Irish Greyhound Derby.

=== Other ===
In April 2022, BOYLE Sports announced its deal with online audio and video betting media company Spotlight Sports Group (SSG), to become official title sponsor of SSG's golf show.

== Brand ambassadors ==
Former Republic of Ireland international footballer, Kevin Kilbane, joined BOYLE Sports as Football Brand Ambassador in 2016. The Match of the Day and Virgin Media Sport pundit offers insight into upcoming football events for BoyleSports customers in shops and online.

Also in 2016, Cheltenham Gold Cup, Aintree Grand National and BoyleSports Irish Grand National winning jockey, Robbie "Puppy" Power joined BOYLE Sports as Horse Racing Ambassador. Previous brand ambassadors have included Stan Collymore, Joseph O'Brien and Gordon Elliott.

In 2021, former England and Liverpool captain Steven Gerrard and sports broadcaster Natalie Sawyer joined BOYLE Sports as brand ambassadors ahead of the 2020 UEFA European Championship.

In 2024, County Carlow based horse trainer, John "Shark" Hanlon joined BOYLE Sports as “Official Stable Partners”, also launching the #TeamHewick initiative.

== Controversies ==
In June 2012, it was reported that employees of BOYLE Sports were made to attend training-courses held by Georgina Dolan, an associate of Tony Quinn. The courses used the Educo Model. John Boyle, who had attended an Educo Seminar, said "I believe totally in myself and my business. I am not part of anything other than being John Boyle, the best that John Boyle can be. What I want to do is train people to be the best they can".

In January 2013 BOYLE Sports retained the services of Tom McCarthy, formerly Chief Executive of the Irish Management Institute, to review the corporate training. Boylesports issued a statement including "Mindfulness training served a purpose for the company at a particular time and it is not something that will be offered in future."

In May 2013 Dialogue Ireland claimed an article about the controversy was their most viewed article with 24,500+ views.
