= Ray Close =

Northern Irish boxer (1969–2026)

Personal information
- Nationality: British
- Born: 20 January 1969 Belfast, Northern Ireland
- Died: 2 October 2026 (aged 57) Newtownards, Northern Ireland
- Weight: Super-middleweight

Boxing career
- Stance: Orthodox

Boxing record
- Total fights: 29
- Wins: 25
- Win by KO: 14
- Losses: 2
- Draws: 1
- No contests: 0

Raymond Close (20 January 1969 – 2 October 2026) was a Northern Irish boxer from Belfast who fought for most of his career in the super-middleweight division, ending his career in the light-heavyweight division. He was a member of the Church of Jesus Christ of Latter-day Saints, commonly Mormon. Close grew up in east Belfast and attended Knockbreda High School.

== Professional career ==
Close turned professional in October 1988, winning his first fight at the Ulster Hall, Belfast, when he knocked out Manchester's Steve Foster in the second of six rounds on a card that included fellow local boxers Eamonn Loughran and Sam Storey.

In his seventh bout he beat Rocky McGran to win the vacant Irish super-middleweight title. He successfully defended the title against Terry Magee, the older brother of Eamonn and Noel, in Dublin in 1991. In 1993, he defeated Vincenzo Nardiello to win the EBU European super-middleweight title in Italy.

=== Eubank fights ===
Later the same year Close faced Chris Eubank for the WBO super-middleweight title. In what would be the first of his two fights against Eubank, the match was declared a draw. After an October win against Ray Domenge, Close again faced Eubank in a rematch at Belfast's King's Hall. Despite having the partisan Belfast crowd behind him, Close lost the match on a split points decision. Both fights with Eubank caused considerable controversy, as Eubank floored Close in the first and had him on the verge of a knockout, yet the fight was declared a draw. The second fight, in which Close performed better, was deemed a points loss.

== Revoked licence and retirement ==
A third fight with Eubank was scheduled in 1995. However shortly before the match the British Boxing Board of Control revoked Close's licence after he failed an MRI scan. Two lesions were subsequently found on his brain. Although Close had his British licence revoked he obtained a licence in the US from the Illinois State Boxing Commission. Close generally fought journeyman boxers in the United States, and finished his career with a run of five straight victories with his last fight being against Cleveland's Larry Willis in which Close won by a knockout in the fifth of eight rounds.

There was some press speculation in 2002 that Close was going to make a return to the ring in an unlicensed boxing event in Belfast; however, the fight did not materialise.

== Later life and death ==
Close spent his last three years in a nursing home in Newtownards, Northern Ireland. He died on 2 October 2026, aged 57.
