= Gerry Storey =

Irish boxing coach (born 1936)

Gerry Storey MBE (born 1936, Belfast, Northern Ireland) is a boxing trainer who has coached the Irish Olympic boxing team on four occasions.

Storey is the head coach of the Holy Family Boxing Club in North Belfast. Storey and the club were featured in the BBC documentary Fight Town in 2003 and the club also appeared in the Daniel Day-Lewis film The Boxer. Storey has trained or co-trained many boxers, including Hugh Russell, Neil Sinclair, Barry McGuigan, Paddy Barnes and Carl Frampton.

McGuigan was training by Storey from the age of 14 through to his Olympic and Commonwealth bids, and claims Storey's club is the "most successful boxing club in the country". Storey's middle son Sam was also an accomplished amateur boxer who competed in the 1984 Summer Olympics, the 1986 Commonwealth Games and won the British Super Middleweight title as a professional.

Storey's work has helped to bridge the sectarian divide in Belfast as he trains both Catholics and Protestants. During the 1981 Irish hunger strike he was asked by Loyalist and Republican prisoners to oversee boxing training in the Maze Prison gymnasium. As a result of his work he won the Sport For Good award at the Laureus World Sports Awards in Estoril, Portugal on 16 May 2005. Storey received his award from Barry McGuigan and Marvin Hagler, and was the first Irish sportsperson to win a Laureus award. Storey was honoured by the Irish Amateur Boxing Association for his contribution to the sport in Dublin on 2 February 2007.

Storey was appointed Member of the Order of the British Empire (MBE) in the 2008 New Year Honours, "for services to Boxing in Northern Ireland".

He was married to Belle for many years and has three sons and one daughter. His eldest son Gerry Junior, who died in January 2025, was a good amateur boxer.
