= Tony Thornton =

American professional boxer (1959–2009)

Personal information
- Nickname: The Punching Postman
- Born: James Anthony Thornton; November 8, 1959 Glassboro, New Jersey, U.S.
- Died: September 10, 2009 (aged 49) Camden, New Jersey, U.S.
- Height: 5 ft 11 in (180 cm)
- Weight: Super Middleweight; Middleweight

Boxing career
- Reach: 71 in (180 cm)
- Stance: Orthodox

Boxing record
- Total fights: 45
- Wins: 37
- Win by KO: 26
- Losses: 7
- Draws: 1

Tony Thornton (November 8, 1959 – September 10, 2009), nicknamed "The Punching Postman" was an American professional boxer who fought for the World Super Middleweight title 3 times. He died in a motorcycle accident, aged 49.

== Professional career ==
During his career as a professional boxer, Tony fought in the Middleweight and Super Middleweight divisions and fought three times for the World Super Middleweight Championship.

== Personal life ==
Tony attended West Chester University. Thornton was also a Postal Mail Carrier, working for 25 years at Bellmawr Post Office where he became supervisor.

== Professional boxing record ==
45 fights	37 wins	7 losses
By knockout	26	2
By decision	11	5
Draws	1	

Key to abbreviations used for results
DQ	Disqualification	RTD	Corner retirement
KO	Knockout	SD	Split decision / split draw
MD	Majority decision / majority draw	TD	Technical decision / technical draw
NC	No contest	TKO	Technical knockout
PTS	Points decision	UD	Unanimous decision / unanimous draw

Boxing record
No.	Result	Record	Opponent	Type	Round(s)	Time	Date	Location	Notes
45	Loss	37–7–1	(United States) Roy Jones Jr.	TKO	3 (12)	0:45	30 Sep 1995	(United States) Pensacola Civic Center, Pensacola, Florida	For IBF super middleweight title
44	Win	37–6–1	(United States) Darren Zenner	TKO	2 (12)	2:49	17 Jan 1995	(United States) The Blue Horizon, Philadelphia, Pennsylvania	Won USBA super middleweight title
43	Win	36–6–1	(United States) Lenzie Morgan	SD	10	N/a	7 Dec 1994	(United States) The Blue Horizon, Philadelphia, Pennsylvania	
42	Loss	35–6–1	(United States) James Toney	UD	12	N/a	29 Oct 1993	(United States) Tulsa Civic Center, Tulsa, Oklahoma	For IBF super middleweight title
41	Win	35–5–1	(United States) Willie Ball	TKO	10 (10)	1:58	21 Sep 1993	(United States) The Blue Horizon, Philadelphia, Pennsylvania	
40	Win	34–5–1	(United States) Frank Minton	TKO	7 (10)	2:56	20 Jun 1993	(United States) Harrah's Marina, Atlantic City, New Jersey	
39	Win	33–5–1	(United States) Iceman John Scully	UD	10	N/a	16 Mar 1993	(United States) The Blue Horizon, Philadelphia, Pennsylvania	
38	Win	32–5–1	(United States) Melvin Wynn	SD	8	N/a	5 Feb 1993	(United States) Harrah's Casino Hotel, Atlantic City, New Jersey	
37	Loss	31–5–1	(United Kingdom) Chris Eubank	UD	12	N/a	19 Sep 1992	(United Kingdom) Scottish Exhibition and Conference Centre, Glasgow, Scotland	For WBO super middleweight title
36	Win	31–4–1	(United States) Khalif Shabazz	KO	1 (8)	0:49	11 Jun 1992	(United States) Harrah's Casino Hotel, Atlantic City, New Jersey	
35	Win	30–4–1	(United States) Danny Mitchell	UD	8	N/a	22 Mar 1992	(United States) Harrah's Marina, Atlantic City, New Jersey	
34	Win	29–4–1	(Venezuela) Fermin Chirino	UD	10	N/a	19 Nov 1991	(United States) Harrah's Marina, Atlantic City, New Jersey	
33	Win	28–4–1	(Dominican Republic) Merqui Sosa	SD	10	N/a	16 May 1991	(United States) Harrah's Marina, Atlantic City, New Jersey	
32	Win	27–4–1	(United States) Eddie A. Hall	TKO	1 (10)	2:10	21 Jan 1991	(United States) Harrah's Marina, Atlantic City, New Jersey	
31	Win	26–4–1	(United States) Carl Sullivan	TKO	9 (10)	1:17	5 Nov 1990	(United States) Harrah's Marina, Atlantic City, New Jersey	
30	Win	25–4–1	(United States) Karema Leota	TKO	2 (10)	0:39	27 Aug 1990	(United States) Harrah's Marina, Atlantic City, New Jersey	
29	Win	24–4–1	(United States) Dave Tiberi	TKO	4 (10)	2:43	21 May 1990	(United States) Harrah's Marina, Atlantic City, New Jersey	
28	Win	23–4–1	(United States) Ralph Ward	SD	10	N/a	12 Feb 1990	(United States) The Blue Horizon, Philadelphia, Pennsylvania	
27	Loss	22–4–1	(Puerto Rico) Ismael Negron	RTD	6 (10)	3:00	20 Nov 1989	(United States) Pennsylvania Hall, Philadelphia, Pennsylvania	
26	Win	22–3–1	(United States) Hector Rosario	UD	10	N/a	25 Sep 1989	(United States) Harrah's Marina, Atlantic City, New Jersey	
25	Loss	21–3–1	(Republic of Ireland) Steve Collins	MD	12	N/a	16 Jul 1989	(United States) Harrah's Marina, Atlantic City, New Jersey	For USBA middleweight title
24	Loss	21–2–1	(United States) Kevin Watts	UD	12	N/a	21 Mar 1989	(United States) Trump Castle, Atlantic City, New Jersey	Lost USBA middleweight title
23	Win	21–1–1	(United States) Mike Tinley	UD	12	N/a	10 Jan 1989	(United States) Harrah's Marina, Atlantic City, New Jersey	Won vacant USBA middleweight title
22	Win	20–1–1	(United States) Tim Williams	TKO	5 (10)	2:55	6 Oct 1988	(United States) Pennsylvania Hall, Philadelphia, Pennsylvania	
21	Win	19–1–1	(United States) Jerry Holly	KO	3 (10)	1:48	28 Jul 1988	(United States) The Blue Horizon, Philadelphia, Pennsylvania	
20	Win	18–1–1	(United States) Tyrone Frazier	UD	10	N/a	12 Feb 1988	(United States) Resorts Casino Hotel, Atlantic City, New Jersey	
19	Loss	17–1–1	(United States) Doug DeWitt	MD	13	N/a	6 Nov 1987	(United States) The Sands, Atlantic City, New Jersey	For vacant USBA middleweight title Fight ended in a draw, and was decided with a "sudden death" 13th round
18	Draw	17–0–1	(United States) Stacy McSwain	PTS	10	N/a	25 Aug 1987	(United States) Bally's Park Place, Atlantic City, New Jersey	
17	Win	17–0	(United States) Darryl Spain	TKO	5 (10)	2:56	1 Jun 1987	(United States) Pennsylvania Hall, Philadelphia, Pennsylvania	
16	Win	16–0	(Venezuela) Basante Blanco	RTD	5 (10)	3:00	5 Mar 1987	(United States) Harrah's Marina, Atlantic City, New Jersey	
15	Win	15–0	(United States) Harry Daniels	KO	2 (10)	2:29	25 Nov 1986	(United States) Harrah's Marina, Atlantic City, New Jersey	
14	Win	14–0	(Colombia) Horacio Perez	TKO	2 (10)	2:19	12 Aug 1986	(United States) Resorts Casino Hotel, Atlantic City, New Jersey	
13	Win	13–0	(United States) Ernest Jackson	KO	2 (10)	?	16 May 1986	(United States) The Sands, Atlantic City, New Jersey	
12	Win	12–0	(United States) Cecil Pettigrew	TKO	10 (10)	0:26	7 Feb 1986	(United States) The Sands, Atlantic City, New Jersey	
11	Win	11–0	(United States) David Barrow	TKO	2 (8)	2:37	5 Nov 1985	(United States) The Sands, Atlantic City, New Jersey	
10	Win	10–0	(United States) Sidney Outlaw	TKO	6 (8)	2:12	5 Sep 1985	(United States) The Sands, Atlantic City, New Jersey	
9	Win	9–0	(United States) Tommy Davenport	TKO	2 (8)	0:52	1 Jul 1985	(United States) The Sands, Atlantic City, New Jersey	
8	Win	8–0	(United States) Jerome Johnson	SD	6	N/a	4 Feb 1985	(United States) The Sands, Atlantic City, New Jersey	
7	Win	7–0	(United States) Thomas Gordon	TKO	2 (8)	1:49	30 Oct 1984	(United States) The Blue Horizon, Philadelphia, Pennsylvania	
6	Win	6–0	(United States) Thomas Gordon	TKO	2 (?)	?	30 Aug 1984	(United States) The Sands, Atlantic City, New Jersey	
5	Win	5–0	(United States) Donnie Williams	KO	1 (6)	?	24 Jul 1984	(United States) The Blue Horizon, Philadelphia, Pennsylvania	
4	Win	4–0	(United States) Jesse Goodmond	TKO	1 (?)	?	14 Jun 1984	(United States) The Sands, Atlantic City, New Jersey	
3	Win	3–0	(United States) Ali Muhammad	TKO	4 (?)	?	27 Jul 1983	(United States) The Blue Horizon, Philadelphia, Pennsylvania	
2	Win	2–0	(United States) Jimmy Barham	KO	1 (4)	?	17 Jul 1983	(United States) The Sands, Atlantic City, New Jersey	
1	Win	1–0	(United States) Steve Waters	TKO	1 (4)	0:20	15 Jun 1983	(United States) Playboy Hotel and Casino, Atlantic City, New Jersey	Professional debut

Sporting positions
Regional boxing titles
Vacant Title last held by Doug DeWitt	USBA Middleweight Champion; January 10, 1989 – March 21, 1989	Next: Kevin Watts
