= CyclingMikey =

Dutch YouTuber (born 1972)

- Born: Michael van Erp; 1972 (age 53–54)
- Occupations: Roller skating instructor; Carer

YouTube information
- Channel: CyclingMikey
- Genre: Cycling
- Subscribers: 122 thousand
- Views: 82.5 million
- Last updated: 14 July, 2026

Michael van Erp (born 1972), better known as CyclingMikey, is a Dutch YouTuber who films London drivers using their mobile phones, as well as committing other traffic offences, which he reports to the police and later uploads to YouTube.

Since 2019, he has caught and exposed several high-profile celebrities allegedly committing such offences, including Guy Ritchie, Chris Eubank, and Frank Lampard. His activism was prompted by his father's death in a road traffic collision with a drunk driver.

== Video content ==
In November 2019, Van Erp filmed Guy Ritchie using a mobile phone while driving. Ritchie was subsequently prosecuted and banned from driving for six months. In 2021, he filmed Chris Eubank driving through a red light, an offence for which Eubank was subsequently prosecuted. In April 2021, he filmed Frank Lampard using a mobile phone and holding a hot drink while driving, but the prosecution was later dropped, due to insufficient evidence, after Lampard hired lawyer Nick Freeman to deal with the case.

A regular location for Van Erp's videos and reports is a crossroads beside Regent's Park, which he dubbed "Gandalf Corner", where he waits and has stopped many drivers from driving on the wrong side of the road past a pedestrian crossing island to avoid queueing to turn right.

Location of "Gandalf Corner" near Regent's Park

In September 2021, while at "Gandalf Corner", Van Erp ended up on the bonnet of celebrity talent agent Paul Lyon-Maris's Range Rover while trying to stop him from making an illegal right turn. Since Lyon-Maris continued to drive with Van Erp on the bonnet, he was charged with assault and dangerous driving, besides the lesser charge of contravening a keep-left sign. Lyon-Maris pleaded guilty to the lesser charge, but he pleaded not guilty to the two greater charges, alleging that Van Erp jumped onto the bonnet while Van Erp claimed Lyon-Maris drove into him and he fell onto the bonnet. A jury cleared Lyon-Maris of both remaining charges.

In November 2022, Van Erp appeared on the BBC television programme Panorama in an episode titled "Road Rage: Cars v Bikes". In April 2024, Van Erp released a video of himself running a red light in Belgravia, London. He stated, "It's my mistake, I hold my hands up, I'm at fault there. ... I missed that the other two traffic lights were still red", and added, "If the police prosecute me, so what? I'll pay the fine, you're not going to see me complaining."

== Personal life ==
Van Erp was born in January 1972 in the Netherlands and grew up in Zimbabwe. When he was 19, his father, while riding a motorbike, was killed by a drunk driver. Van Erp moved to the UK in 1998 to pursue a career in IT. He is now a professional carer. He has also worked as a roller skating instructor. He has two sons, and lives in west London.
