= Daren Zenner =

Canadian boxer (1971–2020)

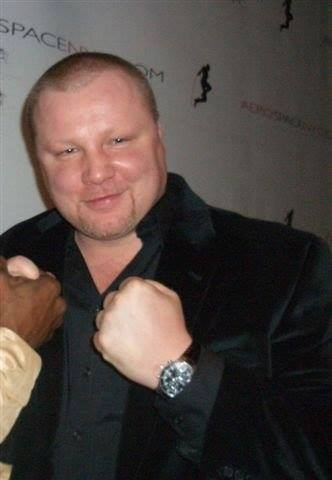

Personal information
- Born: Daren Tomas Zenner; 30 May 1971 Grande Prairie, Alberta, Canada
- Died: 13 May 2020 (aged 48) Canada
- Weight: Light heavyweight and Super middleweight

Boxing career
- Stance: Orthodox

Boxing record
- Total fights: 33
- Wins: 27 (KO 19)
- Losses: 4 (KO 2)
- Draws: 2

Daren Tomas Zenner (May 30, 1971 – May 13, 2020) was a Canadian professional boxer that competed in the super middleweight and light heavyweight weight divisions. He challenged once for the WBO light heavyweight title in 1997.

Zenner fought notable boxers that included world champions and contenders such as Arthur Williams, Lou Del Valle, Tony Thornton and Dariusz Michalczewski.

== Amateur career ==
Zenner grew up in Bezanson, Alberta, and won a gold medal at the Alberta Winter Games in 1988 in boxing which were held in Red Deer, Alberta.

== Professional career ==
Zenner moved to the Las Vegas when he turned professional at the age of 18.

In October 1995, Zenner became the New York State super middleweight champion by beating the nephew of Joe Frazier; Tyrone Frazier.

In December 1997, Zenner competed for the WBO Light Heavyweight Title against undefeated Dariusz Michalczewski in Hamburg, Germany. The fight was stopped due to cuts on Zenner in the 6th round.

== After boxing ==
Following retirement from boxing in 2000, Zenner began a new career within the real-estate industry whilst living in Long Island.

Zenner was married and had four daughters.

Zenner returned to Canada in 2018 where he died suddenly in May 2020.

== Professional boxing record ==
33 fights	27 wins	4 losses
By knockout	19	2
By decision	8	2
Draws	2	

Result	Record	Opponent	Type	Round, time	Date	Location	Notes
Win	27-4-2	(United States) Robert Thomas	TKO	1	24 Jun 2000	Covington, Tennessee, United States	
Win	26-4-2	(United States) Caseny Truesdale	TKO	1	20 Apr 2000	Virginia, United States	
Win	25-4-2	(United States) Tyrone Muex	TKO	3	15 Jan 2000	Covington, Tennessee, United States	
Loss	24-4-2	(United States) Arthur Williams	UD	10	15 Oct 1999	Pensacola, Florida, United States	90-100, 90-100, 90-100.
Win	24-3-2	(United States) Andre Sherrod	TKO	1	26 Aug 1999	(Georgia (U.S. state)) Atlanta, Georgia, United States	
Win	23-3-2	(United States) Ken McCurdy	TKO	2	29 Jul 1999	(Georgia (U.S. state)) Atlanta, Georgia, United States	
Win	22-3-2	(United States) Robert Jackson, Jr.	TKO	2	17 Jun 1999	Norfolk, Virginia, United States	
Loss	21-3-2	(Poland) Dariusz Michalczewski	RTD	6	13 Dec 1997	Alsterdorf, Hamburg, Germany	WBO World Light Heavyweight Title. Zenner retired at 3:00 of the sixth round.
Win	21-2-2	(United States) James Gatlin	TKO	6	13 Jul 1997	(New York (state)) Yonkers, New York, United States	
Win	20-2-2	(United States) Stanley Hughey	KO	1	18 Jun 1997	(New York (state)) Yonkers, New York, United States	
Win	19-2-2	(Venezuela) Fermin Chirino	KO	4	8 Nov 1996	(New York (state)) Yonkers, New York, United States	
Win	18-2-2	(United States) Glenn Burnett	TKO	1	26 Jan 1996	(New York (state)) Melville, New York, United States	
Win	17-2-2	(United States) Tyrone Frazier	SD	10	26 Oct 1995	(New York (state)) Hauppauge, New York, United States	New York Super Middleweight Title.
Win	16-2-2	(United States) Mark Simmons	TKO	4	25 Aug 1995	(New York (state)) Tarrytown, New York, United States	
Win	15-2-2	(United States) Adam Garland	KO	4	19 May 1995	(New York (state)) New York City, United States	
Loss	14-2-2	(United States) Tony Thornton	TKO	2	17 Jan 1995	Philadelphia, Pennsylvania, United States	IBF USBA Super Middleweight Title. Referee stopped the bout at 2:49 of the second round.
Win	14-1-2	(United States) Adam Garland	TKO	12	12 Oct 1994	Atlantic City, New Jersey, United States	
Win	13-1-2	(United States) Roosevelt Williams	TKO	7	18 Aug 1994	(New York (state)) Melville, New York, United States	
Win	12-1-2	(United States) Dominick Carter	TKO	8	3 Nov 1993	Biloxi, Mississippi, United States	
Win	11-1-2	(United States) Mike Jefferson	TKO	2	25 Aug 1993	(New York (state)) White Plains, New York, United States	Referee stopped the bout at 2:38 of the second round.
Loss	10-1-2	(United States) Lou Del Valle	UD	6	6 Mar 1993	(New York (state)) New York City, United States	55-58, 55-58, 55-58.
Draw	10-0-2	(United States) Fabian Garcia	PTS	4	10 Jan 1993	Atlantic City, New Jersey, United States	
Win	10-0-1	(United States) Jamal Arbubakar	MD	6	9 Dec 1992	Newark, New Jersey, United States	
Win	9-0-1	(United States) Roy Payne	UD	4	14 Oct 1992	Atlantic City, New Jersey, United States	
Win	8-0-1	(United States) Caseny Truesdale	UD	4	9 Jul 1992	Atlantic City, New Jersey, United States	
Win	7-0-1	(United States) Moses Lewis	KO	4	28 May 1992	(New York (state)) Monticello, New York, United States	
Win	6-0-1	(United States) Norman Bell	PTS	4	16 Apr 1992	Philadelphia, Pennsylvania, United States	
Draw	5-0-1	(United States) Jeff Sparks	MD	4	30 Nov 1991	Las Vegas, Nevada, United States	38-38, 40-36, 38-38.
Win	5-0	(United States) Jose Cataneo	PTS	4	26 Mar 1991	Las Vegas, Nevada, United States	
Win	4-0	(United States) James Rivas	SD	4	15 Feb 1991	Las Vegas, Nevada, United States	39-37, 37-39, 39-37.
Win	3-0	(United States) Alberto Garcia	TKO	1	21 Dec 1990	Las Vegas, Nevada, United States	
Win	2-0	(Mexico) Ariel Conde	TKO	3	20 Aug 1990	Las Vegas, Nevada, United States	
Win	1-0	(Mexico) Ariel Conde	UD	4	2 Jul 1990	Las Vegas, Nevada, United States	
