= Green Glens Arena =

Arena in Millstreet, Republic of Ireland

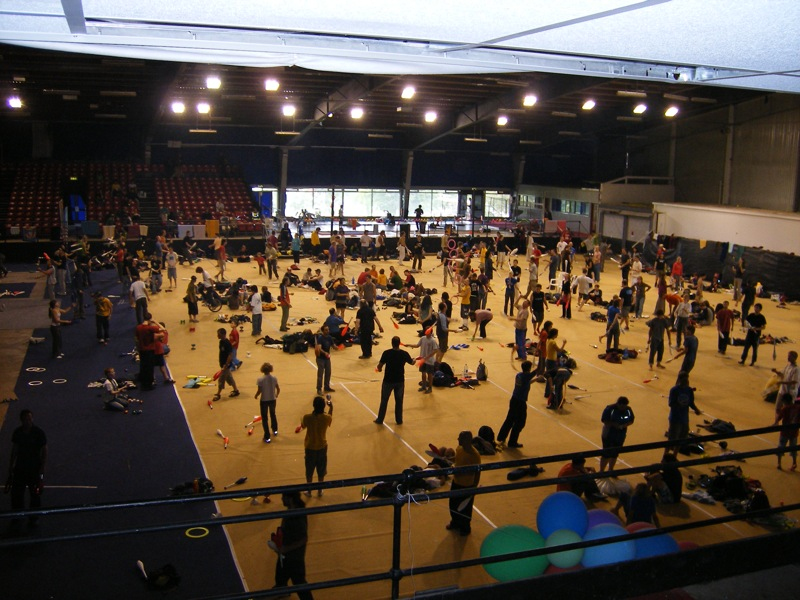
- European Juggling Convention 2006
- Interactive map of Green Glens Arena
- Location: Millstreet, County Cork, Ireland
- Coordinates: 52.063151°N 9.063249°W
- Owner: Noel C. Duggan Ltd.
- Capacity: 8,000

Construction
- Opened: 1973
- Renovated: 1993
- Architect: Noel C. Duggan

The Green Glens Arena (sometimes referred to as Millstreet Arena) is a public entertainment location in Millstreet, in County Cork, Ireland. There is a 20 hectares (49 acres) outdoor estate for equestrian sporting events and an indoor arena measuring 80 metres (260 feet) by 40 metres (130 feet).

The hall and equestrian facility was built by Noel C. Duggan, and the complex continues to be operated by the local Duggan entrepreneurial family. The indoor arena has a capacity of 8,000.

== Events ==
The equestrian centre hosts international events annually and offers an enclosed menage, cross-country riding, hacking and riding instruction and residential weekends.

It hosted Eurovision Song Contest 1993, which was won by Ireland's Niamh Kavanagh. Steve Collins twice successfully defended his World Boxing Organization (WBO) super middleweight boxing championship in Millstreet, against Chris Eubank in 1995, and against Neville Brown in 1996.

In July 2006 and July 2014, it hosted the 29th and 37th European Juggling Convention, with over 2,000 jugglers from 40 countries attended the week-long event. In December 2007 it hosted the John Deere show, in which Deere & Company unveiled new agricultural machinery. It also hosted the Farm Machinery Show in January 2008 and 2009. Several artists have performed there, such as Pearl Jam, The Prodigy, James Blunt and Westlife.

After the 2022 Russian invasion of Ukraine, the arena was agreed to be used for temporary accommodation for Ukrainian refugees.

Preceded by Malmö Isstadion; Malmö	Eurovision Song Contest; Venue; 1993	Succeeded by Point Theatre; Dublin
