= Barry Hearn =

English sports promoter (born 1948)

Barry Hearn OBE
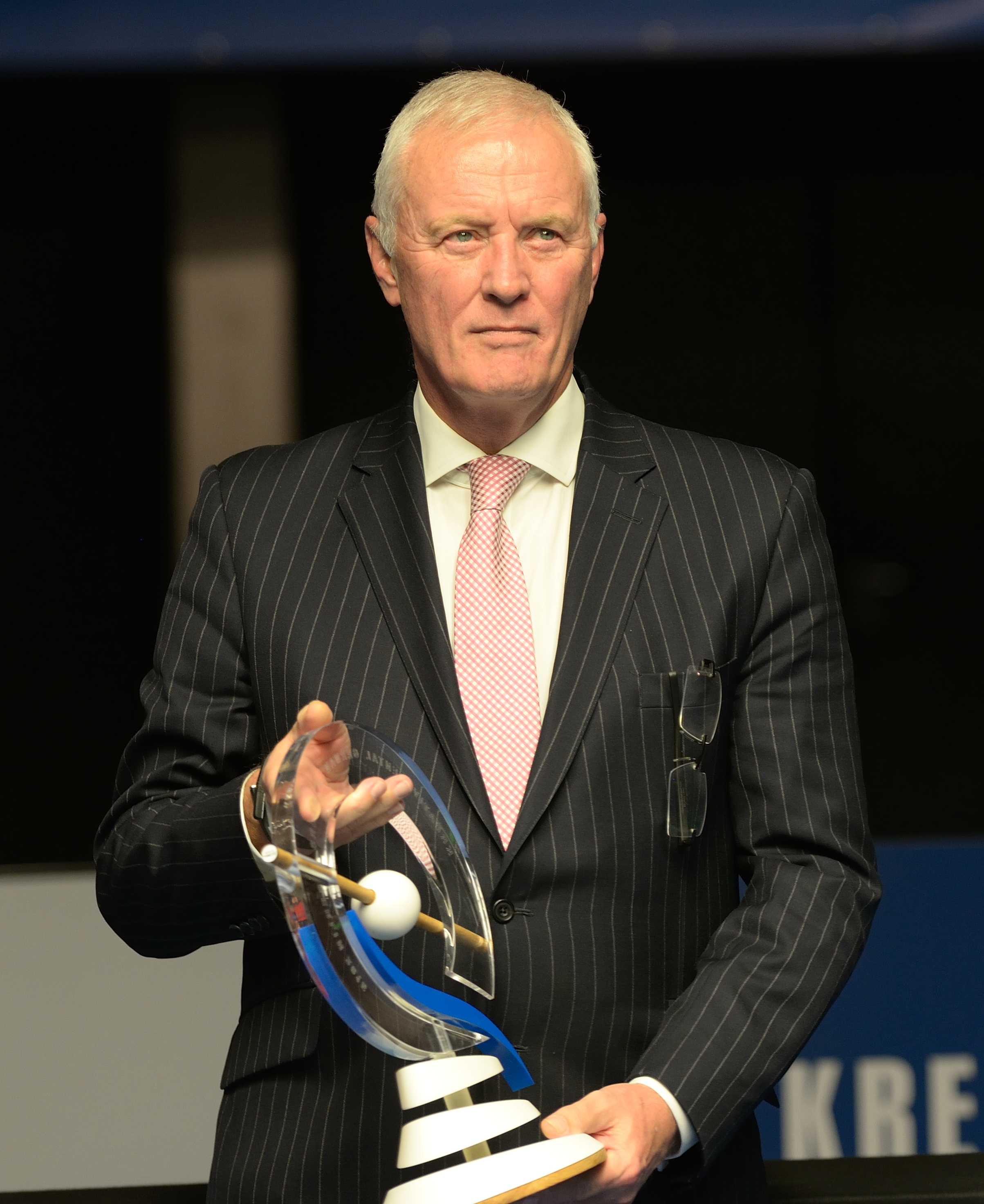
- Hearn at the Snooker German Masters, 2015
- Born: 19 June 1948 (age 77); Dagenham, England
- Occupation: Sports promoter
- Years active: 1973–present
- Organization: Matchroom Sport
- Known for: Sports promotion (boxing, darts, football, snooker, table tennis)
- Spouse: Susan Hearn
- Children: 2, including Eddie

Barry Maurice William Hearn (born 19 June 1948) is an English sports promoter who is founder and president of Matchroom Sport. Through Matchroom, Hearn is also involved in many sports including boxing, snooker, darts, pool, tenpin bowling, golf, table tennis and fishing. Until April 2021 Hearn was the chairman of the Professional Darts Corporation and until July 2010, chairman of the World Professional Billiards and Snooker Association. Until July 2014, he was the chairman of Leyton Orient F.C.

== Early life ==
Hearn was born in 1948 on a council estate in Dagenham, Essex. His family moved to the Debden estate in Loughton. He was educated at Buckhurst Hill County High School. He worked and then ran a series of small businesses as a teenager, from washing cars to picking fruit and vegetables.

After qualifying as an accountant, Hearn took over the role of finance director to a design company based in Kensal Green, called Deryck Healey Associates (circa 1973). He formed a new firm, Kensal House Investments, and DHA became Deryck Healey International (DHI).

== Career ==
=== Snooker ===
In the early 1970s, looking for a property investment, Hearn bought a snooker hall in Romford, Greater London. The same year, the BBC began promoting snooker on BBC2 in colour television, resulting in queues of people wanting to play snooker. Hearn and business partner Deryck John Healey then bought Lucania Billiard Halls, which formed the basis of his future career, promoting snooker via colour television.

Hearn began promoting sporting events in 1974, working with amateur snooker players Geoff Foulds, father of Neal Foulds, and Vic Harris. In 1976, he became manager of Steve Davis, who went on to win the World Championship six times.

Hearn prospered from the snooker boom of the 1980s when he formed Matchroom with players Davis and Tony Meo. Later Matchroom snooker players include Terry Griffiths, Dennis Taylor, Willie Thorne, Neal Foulds, Jimmy White, Cliff Thorburn and Ronnie O'Sullivan. Hearn appeared alongside many Matchroom players in the video for "Snooker Loopy", a hit for "rockney" pop rock duo Chas & Dave.

In December 2009 Hearn was elected as the new WPBSA Chairman after Sir Rodney Walker failed to get re-elected and left his post. In June 2010, following a vote by the members, Hearn took over a 51% controlling interest in the organisation's commercial business World Snooker Limited with a view to revitalising the game. The commercial business was separated from the regulatory body, the WPBSA.

=== Boxing ===
Hearn moved into boxing in 1987, his first promotion being the Frank Bruno versus Joe Bugner bout at White Hart Lane in October 1987. He offered the television rights to Greg Dyke of London Weekend Television for £200,000, who agreed to pay £250,000 because he did not believe Hearn could deliver for the quoted price.

Hearn has since promoted many leading British and Irish boxers, including Chris Eubank, Nigel Benn, Lennox Lewis, Naseem Hamed, Steve Collins and Herbie Hide.

Hearn withdrew his boxers Herbie Hide and Steve Collins from the High Noon in Hong Kong event at the last minute, scheduled on 22 October 1994, when promoter John Daly could not come up with the purses. Hearn said, "But to be honest I was very pleased with myself in Hong Kong. I stood my ground. How many others would have?"

In April 2008 Hearn introduced the Prizefighter series, a knockout tournament featuring 8 different boxers. His son Eddie now manages the boxing side of the business.

Hearn is credited as appearing in the film One Night in Millstreet. In the trailer for the film Hearn is seen dismissing claims made that boxer Steve Collins was hypnotised by Cult-leader Tony Quinn to not feel pain as "What a load of rubbish".

=== Darts ===
Hearn was until April 2021 the chairman of the Professional Darts Corporation, one of darts' two governing bodies, the sport having been split since the world's leading players left the British Darts Organisation in 1992. He made several attempts to buy out the rival body, which would reunify the game, but has been unsuccessful.

=== Football ===
Hearn was the chairman of the football league club Leyton Orient from 1995 to 2014. Before Hearn's takeover the club was facing a financial disaster due to the collapse of the then chairman Tony Wood's coffee business in Rwanda at the time of the Rwandan genocide. Hearn's intervention and financial input assured the club's future. Although Hearn has been successful in stabilising the club financially, his tenure included the club's longest run in the bottom division (the fourth tier) of the Football League since its creation (in 1958). At the culmination of the 2005–06 season, Orient earned promotion to the third tier of English league football (League One), their first automatic promotion since the 1969–70 season.

In April 2017, Hearn resigned as honorary president of Leyton Orient registering his disapproval of the new owner, Francesco Becchetti, who he claimed had "not played by the rules" leaving Leyton Orient players and staff unpaid for March 2017.

=== Fishing ===
Hearn is a fisherman. After watching the first recording of Wrestle Mania in Ockenden, he pitched the idea of Fish-o-Mania to Greg Dyke at LWT. Turned down, he sold the idea to Sky Sports, establishing a 19-year television franchise.

== Personal life ==
Married to Susan, the couple have two children, Katie and Eddie Hearn. After nearly going bankrupt in the early 1990s, and suffering a heart attack in 2002, he returned and has become a multi-millionaire.

Hearn was appointed Officer of the Order of the British Empire (OBE) in the 2021 New Year Honours for services to sport. That year, Hearn was inducted into the Professional Darts Corporation Hall of Fame.

In September 2025, Hearn was awarded the Freedom of the City of London.
