= Mike Garde =

Mike Garde is a South African born theologian and an expert on cults. He is the director of Dialogue Ireland. Garde is a Mennonite and is a member of Grosvenor Baptist Church in Rathmines. In 1978, he was supported by the London Mennonist Mission, in establishing the Irish Mennonist Mission in Dublin. He was the first non-Catholic to study for the Bachelor of Divinity at St Patrick's College, Maynooth in 1975. He also gained an H.Dip in Education. Prior to attending Maynooth he studied for a Diploma in Theology at the Irish Baptist College in Belfast and University College London. He received an M.A. in Theology in 2006 from the Milltown Institute in Dublin.

Garde appears regularly on radio and TV discussing cults in Ireland on behalf of Dialogue Ireland, and speaks in secondary schools in Ireland on the dangers of cults.

== Legal cases involving Garde ==
In July 2012, Mr Justice Gerard Hogan ordered Garde and Sunday World journalist Nicola Tallant to appear in United States District Court for the District of Colorado to give evidence in Cornec v. Morrice and Others (2012) and adjourned for a month to allow them to apply the orders to be set aside. The court heard how both were "party to communications relevant to the Colorado proceedings." It was claimed Tallant could be urged to reveal the sources for her stories.

In September 2012, the Irish High Court ruled that Garde and Nicola Tallant did not have to give evidence. Mr Justice Gerard Hogan set aside orders saying "if, as she maintains, Mr Quinn holds unorthodox religious views and is effectively the leader of a religious cult which has used psychological techniques as a means of controlling gullible adherents, the media are entitled to educate public opinion in this regard."

In September 2018, it was reported that defamation proceedings were issued against Random House Group by Paul Tweed over a suggestion in the Dan Brown book Origin that a cult-monitoring group in Ireland took money to fight a Catholic sect. The reference only appears in first-editions and was removed for the paperback.
