= Morelia Institute of Technology =

Public university in Michoacán, Mexico

Instituto Tecnológico de Morelia
- Motto: Técnica, progreso de México ("Technique, progress of Mexico")
- Type: Public
- Established: 1964
- Director: Dra. Patricia Calderón Campos
- Students: 4,032
- Location: Morelia, Michoacán, Mexico; 19.7235°N 101.1859°W
- Colors: Yellow and burgundy
- Nickname: Ponies
- Website: www.itmorelia.edu.mx

The Morelia Institute of Technology (Spanish: Instituto Tecnológico de Morelia), also known as Morelia Tech (Tec de Morelia), is a public university in Morelia, Michoacán, Mexico founded in 1964.

== Academics ==
=== Undergraduate programs ===
- Mechanical Engineering
- Industrial Engineering
- Electrical Engineering
- Electronics Engineering
- Computer Engineering
- Biochemical Engineering
- Materials Science
- Administration
- Enterprise Management Engineering
- Computer Science
- Information Technologies and Communications
- Accounting
- Semiconductors
- Biomedical engineering
- Mechatronic

=== Graduate programs ===
- Master of Industrial Engineering
- Master of Science in Mechanical Engineering
- Master of Science in Electrical Engineering
- Master of Science in Electronical Engineering
- Master of Science in Metallurgy
- Master of Science in Computer Sciences

=== Doctoral programs ===
- Electrical Engineering
- Engineering Science (Electronics, Materials Technologies and Metallurgical Sciences)
