= Dialogue Ireland =

Ecumenical religious awareness trust

Dialogue Ireland is an independent trust, established in 1992, which works to promote awareness and understanding of religious issues and cultism in Ireland. It is an ecumenical body which counters the rise in a number of new religions and cults in Ireland. It grew out of the Catholic-run Cult Awareness Centre becoming an ecumenical body of the mainline Christian churches. Among those who worked in the field in its early years were, Fr. Martin Tierney, a priest of the Archdiocese of Dublin, who served as Chairperson of the group; Mike Garde (a Mennonite, who is now Director of Dialogue Ireland); and Dominican priest Fr. Louis Hughes OP (who served as Chairperson of Dialogue Ireland).

Dialogue Ireland has published articles covering groups such as the Educo Seminar and House of Prayer, Achill, and Scientology.

== See also ==
- Cult Information Centre
- Decult Conference
- European Federation of Centres of Research and Information on Sectarianism
- Info-Cult
- International Cultic Studies Association
- MIVILUDES
- The Family Survival Trust
