= Susan Morrice =

Geologist, explorer, and entrepreneur

Susan Morrice (born 1952 or 1953) is a Northern Irish geologist, explorer, and entrepreneur. She was the first to find oil in commercial quantities in Belize and is one of the founding members of BNE (Belize Natural Energy). Later on she started XJet Worldwide. She received a MoD degree in geology from Trinity College Dublin. She has promoted Educo Seminars.

== Early life ==
She was born and raised in Belfast, Northern Ireland and is the elder sister of Jane Morrice. Her interest in geology stems from her childhood memories. "My attraction to geology was nature. As a young girl in Ireland, dashing about the rocks, playing in the waves... I was just fascinated." As a child, she visited popular geological sites with her family, which made her develop a passion for rocks and soils. She later decided to pursue a career in Geology when she learned it was a profession. She recalls thinking, "I’m going to do that". During her post secondary education, the movement of tectonic plates was an emerging study. She later learned how the Geology industry works when she started traveling around the world for an American-Canadian stratigraphic. By discovering the world and the industry, she developed a strong interest in mapping and the geological aspects of new areas like farmlands.

== Education ==
Morrice attended grammar school at Ashleigh School, which is now called Hunterhouse College. She was one of four women during her first year who studied Natural Sciences at Trinity College Dublin, and later specialised in geology. Morrice graduated in 1976 with a Bachelor of Arts (honors) in Natural Science/Geology. During her time of education, continental drift was becoming a more accepted theory. The geological world was evolving and changing due to new concepts coming to life and becoming more relevant. Morrice pointed out, “geology was really evolving." Morrice failed her first year of college. Through a recommendation and push from her Geology professor, she was given the chance to redo her first year. Due to financial burden of post- secondary she got a job at the restaurant Captain Americas while redoing her first year. Through experience from Captain Americas, Susan attributes that success comes from hard work.

== Career ==
After graduating from Trinity College, Morrice began working for American-Canadian Stratigraphic where she was given the opportunity to travel the world surveying and networking with other geologists in the industry. When talking about this time of her life, she recalls how “the concept of plate tectonics was just taking hold, [geology] is a science where you can keep asking questions, and I loved being a part of the process”. She joined Knight Royalty as a frontier geologist. This job included mapping and more community-based interactions. In 1982, she left Knight Royalty and started her own company, S. Morrice and Associates, LLC. In the early 1990s, the American Association of Petroleum Geologists (AAPG) asked her and Roger Slatt to head the international convention of the AAPG. This led to the birth of the International Pavilion which gives a platform for oil companies to access new contracts in different countries. She founded Belize Natural Energy (BNE) with Mike Usher in 1991 and located their first oil well in a sandstone reservoir. In the mid-2000s she started another company, XJet Worldwide. She is currently the chairwoman of BNE and CHx Capital, a private investment firm.

=== Belize Natural Energy ===
As a young geologist, Morrice was invited to go to Belize to look into the oil potential. Although she was seeking for new job opportunities, she enjoyed working with everyone in Belize and knew there was a good chance in finding oil in Belize. She and a Belizean man, Mike Usher, explored for many years shooting seismic and by drilling but were unsuccessful. Morrice spent four years researching and found a seminar presented by Tony Quinn that she felt could help her learn more. She attended a 12-day Educo Seminar in 2002. Immediately after that, she went to Belize to set up BNE. Soon after trying to start this in Belize, she realized that it was a difficult sell as there were 50 dry holes. Together, Usher and Morrice went to Ireland to talk to others who took the Educo course and were willing to help in Belize. After receiving funding, for the drilling, from Irish investors, Usher abruptly became ill and died in June 2004. They only had enough income for two wells, and in 2005 the first well was a success and was named it "Mike Usher #1". After the success of the first well, they drilled five more wells which were all successful and carried on to build BNE. Since starting the company, BNE has drilled more than 62 wells, producing over 10 million barrels of oil.

International Natural Energy (INE) was created to hold shares in BNE. International Natural Energy was founded by Shelia McCaffrey, Paul Marriott, Jean Cornec, Mike Usher and Morrice. Usher died a year before oil was struck in Belize. Morrice was named as defendant with 3 cases brought by 3 of the remaining living co-founders of INE.

In January 2011, Tony Quinn was ordered by the Eastern Caribbean Supreme Court to purchase Marriott's shares in INE and found in breach of his fiduciary duties to INE in a case against Quinn, Morrice and INE. Quinn was ordered to pay costs for the action. Marriott expressed a hope INE would dissociate with Quinn and recover damages by him against shareholders.

In January 2012, Quinn was compelled by Mr Justice Patrick McCarthy of the Irish High Court to give video evidence in a case in the United States District Court for the District of Colorado brought by Cornec who claimed to not be paid fully the amount of $15 million for the sale of shares in INE to Morrice. Morrice counterclaimed that Cornec broke his contract with a campaign of disparagement against Quinn resulting in the loss of a $100 million investment from Dubai.

Between October and December 2018 Morrice was the "GEM Executive in Residence" at the University of Colorado Denver.

== Educo ==
Morrice has promoted the Educo Seminar and the Educo Model and recruit for the group, which has been described as cult-like.

In the June 2018 edition of the American Association of Petroleum Geologists' Explorer magazine, Morrice states she sent Elsia Pop, winner of the Diana Award in 2017, to the Educo Seminar.

== Awards and achievements ==
- Morrice was the first woman to receive the Norman Foster Outstanding Explorer award by the AAPG.
- Morrice received the AAPG Presidential Award for Exemplary service in recognition of her work in geoscience.
- Morrice received the 2018 Norman H. Foster Outstanding Explorer Award from the AAPG.
