= Tony Quinn (businessman) =

Irish businessman, yoga entrepreneur and alleged cult leader

- Born: 7 February 1946 (78 years old); Arbour Hill, Dublin, Ireland
- Occupation: Yoga entrepreneur

Tony Quinn (born 7 February 1946) is an Irish businessman, yoga entrepreneur, mind coach and cult leader who founded the Educo Cult.

== Background ==
Quinn was born in Arbour Hill in inner-city Dublin. Quinn left school early and was a salesman for HB Ice Cream. At the age of 17, he was an apprentice butcher in Phibsborough and then a bouncer at Club Go Go on Dame Street in Dublin.

== Career ==
In the 1970s, he established communes in Templeogue and Howth where members were often on limited pay.

In 1978, the News Of The World confronted Quinn with his claims he could cure cancer. They made him aware of the UK's Cancer Act 1939, which states "No person shall take part in the publication of any advertisement containing an offer to treat any person for cancer." Quinn responded "I wasn't aware of that. It was a genuine mistake". In 2006 a follower of Quinn who operated an Educogym in Glasgow repeated the assertion that Quinn could cure cancer.

Quinn has been variously described as a yogi, "fitness expert", "health guru", "business guru", "mind trainer","mind coach", "saviour", "visionary", "hypnotist" and "cult leader".

He became well known in Ireland as a hypnotherapist and "mind trainer" for professional boxer Steve Collins before being sacked after 3 fights. Collins told Sky Sports "We fooled the world", and also stated in his autobiography he said "We've fooled him", after his first fight with hypnotherapist Quinn as advisor. Collins later said of Quinn that he was someone who helped him on his way but he was inferior when compared to other hypnotists.

Educo is categorised as a "Human Potential Group" and "Therapy / Counseling Group" by the Cult Education Institute.

In 2009, Sunday World journalist Nicola Tallant reported on the contents of video footage obtained by the newspaper of an Educo Seminar and stated "In the tape Quinn claims that he is able to programme children to ensure they have a much better future, claiming he uses the same techniques that Hitler used to programme children to carry out acts of genocide and Hamas use to create suicide bombers from kindergarten children." The Sunday World stated on the tape Quinn says "Children, if you realise, are almost like sponge. Their minds are sensitive and you can put programmes into children’s minds"

In 2009 the Sunday World reported that Mike Garde, who had campaigned against Cults in Ireland, had been issued a death-threat by a Cult in Ireland. In September 2009 Dialogue Ireland published an article that indicated it was Quinn himself that issued the death-threat.

=== Yoga ===
June Levine visited a Templeogue commune in 1974 where she stayed one night with 36 followers who told her they believed they were reincarnated with Quinn from the time of Jesus Christ; one follower believed himself to be the reincarnation of Saint Joseph.

One 21-year-old orphan follower had completed a 40-day water fast and weighed 5½ stone (35 kg) and had stopped menstruating. The fast was to reconnect with God, but "not the God of religion but to the Energy that is the life force." She explained that not menstruating she had no impurities in her body. When Levine challenged Quinn on this, he responded "The yoga diet of fruit or fasting improves the body so much it becomes clean. There are no impurities to be drained away".

Levine described how commune members David and Aideen Cowman had put their baby on a diet without milk, instead receiving "bone meal tablets and halibut oil". Later that year it was reported a lady who moved to the Templeogue commune and studied Quinn's form of Yoga became disinterested in her children and developed an obsession with the Essenes religion. On returning from the commune she required psychiatric care and refused one of her children milk in any form. Quinn was questioned by Sunday World about his form of Yoga which he explained was different to the Yoga Sutras.

Templeogue commune members wrote to the Sunday World saying the article was not fair in what was described as "an avalanche of letters" and were noted that "the similarity of their content is rather remarkable". The letters claimed the lady, who stayed at the commune for 10 days, was "mentally disturbed before she went" to the commune and there was no consistent explanation as to why she was allowed to stay.

One letter claimed many psychiatrists recommended Tony Quinn's Yoga for similar cases.

A photostat of a letter written by a commune member named Sean Nolan was in circulation and claimed "The classes were unique. And Tony was unique. He was taught by no man, followed no teacher, for he was born with certain abilities which made all of this unnecessary."

The letter described how people like Mozart, Leonardo da Vinci and Thomas Edison attributed their creations to a greater intelligence that Quinn possessed, and that "Jesus, Buddha and other great masters of the past" used this intelligence. The letter stated that in the world was only one man who could "practice this meditation at its perfect level – Tony Quinn".

The letter went on "he seems to be transformed into light as the aura vanishes and the outline of his body becomes indefinite". The letter later claimed Quinn could heal the sick and cast out evil spirits.

In 1977 the Evening Press reported on the disappearance of two members of the Howth commune of 34 members living together for 4 years. The commune's library contained books on Occult, "How To" books", Health and Fitness, Factual, Religious, Classic and Astrology subjects. Quinn himself did not live in the commune. When asked about the finances Quinn responded "Everybody thinks I am making a fortune".

Quinn addressed the claims that families have been broken by his influence, "People say We break up families — but the opposite should be the case". When asked about the high costs he responded "Our ambition would be to give classes for nothing. But it seems people don't attend in the same way, as when they pay for them."

Martin and Margaret Forde, both long time followers of Quinn, were seen at the Templeogue commune in 1974 and Martin was seen at the Howth commune in 1977.

=== Educo ===
During an early seminar Quinn held in 1994 he revealed thoughts on his purpose. He spoke about how he did not know if he was starting a cult, and how he felt his purpose could be to work with millions of people. His stated he required followers to submit totally to him and to not resist. He talked about being able to determine the thoughts you have, likening them to computer programs that together form a personality that is not yourself.

Quinn teaches his Educo Model on the ten-day remote overseas seminars which the Educo World website states offers the following results within a statistical-sample:

- An increase of turnover of 62% in the first year, 108% and the second year, 190% in the third year; a total of 360%.
- Average income to increase 88% each year, a total of 264% over 3 years.
- Achieving goals 67% increase over 3 years.
- A 32% average life satisfaction increase after 3 to 6 months. Measured as 55% after 3 years.

Quinn's Educo Model incorporated the Ten percent of the brain myth which suggests we do not use all of our brain which was disputed by Ciarán Benson, a professor of psychology at University College Dublin who said Quinn's claims were "simplistic in the extreme and without any acceptable research". Quinn has said “now it's sometimes said to be as little as 1-3%" with regard to usage of the human-brain and has likened the mind to a computer which has been ruined by "thought programmes".

Quinn promotes his concept of "Unconscious Attention" where it is possible to replace the programming of the mind to increase a person's potential. "If you want something, believe that you have it without any inner doubt and it will come about" he said. With "Unconscious Attention" you can reach a state where you will be 100 times more aware and you can then "photograph" your goal which you will then achieve effortlessly or install a new mind programme.

Professor Ian Robertson, Professor of Psychology at Trinity College Dublin, dismissed the concept of "Unconscious Attention" saying he did not think it would be recognised by brain or cognitive scientists. He reinforced the fallacy of the ten percent of the brain myth saying we used all of our brains most of the time.

Quinn's theories were described as primitive by Professor Ciarán Benson, saying Quinn's abilities lay in "identifying such peoples needs and distresses rather than on any scientific or theoretical understanding of contemporary human psychology", adding Quinn had a "banal and superficial understanding of psychology or of other human beings."

He described Quinn's metaphor of the "thought programme" as "very misleading", adding in Quinn's talk he would move "from one crude metaphor to another", before adding "These metaphors have no defensible relationship to a scientific or philosophical understanding of human psychology".

In 2012 it was reported that employees of BoyleSports were made to attend compulsory Mindfulness training-courses held by Georgina Dolan, an associate of Quinn. The courses promoted the Educo Model which upset many employees forced to attend these courses. A circular sent to staff said "When people's minds are occupied by fear, anger, jealousy, blame, conspiracy, suspicion and other negative emotions, their clarity of thought and mental and physical agility is degraded, leading to lower quality of work".

In 2025 it was reported that BBC Radio Derby and Sabras Radio presenter Pam Sidhu and her husband were recruiters for EDUCO and that the BBC had ignored safeguarding reports about her.

Previously in 2019 Sabras Radio published two podcasts hosted by presenter Pam Sidhu featuring guest Caroline McDonagh, a nutritionist from Ireland, who was described by the Sunday World as a "disciple" of Quinn.

Another 2019 episode of the Sabras Radio podcast hosted by Sidhu featured Babu Shah who self-identifies as an "EDUCO Seminar Agent".

=== Seminars ===
The seminars incorporate guided meditations; speaking to attendees Quinn would describe a visualisation of wealth to which the attendees would respond with ecstatic vigour. Attendees would be offered CDs of guided-meditations and be encouraged to listen daily when at home. Quinn would often repeat the need for attendees to recommend the seminars to others for attendees to achieve success on their return.

Investigative journalist Frank Parlato, who also covered the American sex cult of NXIVM, summed up “Unconscious Attention®,” which Quinn claims is the core of his Educo seminars; "Quinn [claimed] his 'mind technology' would increase a student’s 'life force' [or Qi], raise their consciousness and deepen their life experience.

"He taught that by increasing 'life force,' a person becomes happier, healthier, and more successful.

"He taught that people must tap into the 'innate mental capacity and power' of the unconscious mind to increase life force. This allows them to use more of their mind to achieve their highest potential and transform into 'Super You.'

"Ten-day seminars cost $20,000. After learning preliminary 'mind technology,' students can advance to the “Mind Masters” course, which costs $50,000."

An attendee of a seminar told of attendees spending hours flailing on the floor, and of Folie imposée (jumping around whilst seeing and pointing to lights coming out of the sea when there were none) under the instruction of Quinn.

In 2005, The Sunday Times sent in an undercover reporter to a London invitation-only event where it was revealed Educo, Quinn's life-system, planned to expand in the United Kingdom and also offer its form of hypnotherapy to children. The Educo Seminars operated like a pyramid-selling scheme and the reporter was encouraged to borrow to pay for the two-week seminar fee of £12,000. About 70 people would attend each seminar held in locations such as Egypt and the Bahamas, and were offered weekly "top-up" sessions. A £15,000 seminar fee would generate £2,000 for the person who made the introduction; if the newcomer recruited someone else the introducer would receive a further £1,000.

A second journalist was also encouraged to borrow, using their credit-card, the £12,000 fee to attend an Educo Seminar in an Educogym in Glasgow in 2006. When the journalist said she was worried about getting into debt the Educogym owner told them some attendees had remortgaged their house to pay the seminar fee. The owner of the Gym told the reporter how Quinn healed attendees of the seminar, claiming he had "cured people of cancer and all sorts of things." A third journalist was urged to borrow £15,000 from a bank or credit-union under the premise of borrowing for a car, and to not worry as the "money could be made back easily".

Professor Patricia Casey, Professor of Psychiatry at the Mater Misericordiae University Hospital. said the costs of the seminar were at least 12 times that offered within Psychiatric circles, adding half the population would be entitled to free treatment with the Medical card. Sean Collins, president of the Irish Institute For Counselling and Hypnotherapy, questioned the inflated costs saying world-class trainers in this field charged at least 15 times less.

Professor Casey said the seminars did not teach people how to think positively, rather it told them to think positively without giving them any skills to achieve positive thinking, such as learning how to solve problems and find solutions. Professor Casey talked about the conformity experienced in seminar group sessions and how "people might well feel a great sense of emptiness and let down" on their return home.

Sean Collins spoke of how conditioning from the seminars could put attendees at risk of something akin to the Dunning–Kruger effect, adding that he had met attendees of the seminars who could not produce any substantive results and only enthusiastic anecdotes.

Between 2–8 October 2006, Quinn hosted a 7-day Educo Seminar attended by the Cabinet of Belize, populated by the People's United Party, on Caye Chapel which was paid for by "friends of the party".

In 2009 Dialogue Ireland was said to have worked with 300 people who were dissatisfied with their experiences of Quinn. The Sunday Times claimed differing views of Quinn's seminar business by seminar attendees, from an expensive personal-development course to him overseeing a manipulative overpriced mind-altering scheme. Dialogue Ireland staged the first protest outside of a Dublin free invitation-only 1-day-seminar in January 2009.

Four RTÉ Liveline broadcasts in the week before the 1-day-seminar were broadcast with calls critical of Quinn and his seminar with callers alluding Educo was, as reported by the Irish Independent, a "cult". Quinn later complained about media coverage of his Educo seminar saying "It's a witch-hunt. It has upset an awful lot of good people and it could do damage to people's reputations and livelihoods." He continued "What I charge is really in the same ballpark as other people at the top of this league, people like Anthony Robbins. I do most of my seminar work in the Bahamas and Monte Carlo now. I help people achieve goals in their life and work continuously with people."

Quinn reportedly complained to the Broadcasting Complaints Commission in Ireland about Joe Duffy's Liveline show. It was later revealed in 2012 that Sunday World had seen a "military-style intelligence file" on Joe Duffy, paid for by International Natural Energy and produced by Henrima Ltd., "alleging he is a member of religious group 'Opus Dei'".

In 2010 the fees for the Educo Seminar were reportedly dropped by 66% to €6000 in the hope of increasing attendance which had slumped due to negative publicity and as a "face-saving" exercise.

Introductory events for the Educo Seminar were held in London as recently as May 2020 with long-term members of Educo "Manj & Alex Weerasekera".

Ex-followers who have spoken out have been publicly shamed. Journalist Anna Nolan wrote how ex-followers were afraid to speak of their experience.

=== International Natural Energy ===
Quinn was once a director and shareholder of energy company International Natural Energy (INE) in Belize. In 2011, his holdings in the company were worth approximately €18 million. He was reportedly given shares by the company's directors after using his "mind technology" skills to assist them in finding oil. Mr Justice Bannister ruled in 2012 that Quinn's appointment to the board was "plainly invalid" and that there was a "serious question" over his allotment of shares.

INE was founded by Sheila McCaffrey. Paul Marriott, Jean Cornec, Mike Usher and Susan Morrice. 90% of the company's investors were Irish attendees of Quinn's Educo seminars. Over 300 investors bought between €40,000 and €200,000 of shares. In 2010, his estimated worth was €50 million.

In November 2007, 40 days after Quinn hosted a 7-day Educo Seminar for the Cabinet of Belize on Caye Chapel, the House of Representatives passed the Income Tax on Petroleum Companies Bill, previously blocked by the Senate, with 2 amendments; a 40% income tax paid retroactively to January 2006 instead of March and paid in U.S. dollars. Opposition leader Dean Barrow said "What has been proposed, what has been passed, is far from fair to the Belizean people."

During the 2009 AGM for INE photographs of an ex-follower. who later sued Quinn for "assault and battery; allegedly obtaining money by false pretences; alleged fraudulent misrepresentation, intentional or careless infliction of mental suffering and suborning", and her teenage son were projected onto large screens. Quinn is reported to have adopted a "Messianic pose" and warned shareholders to not talk to journalists. In 2012 Sunday World revealed this ex-follower had been included in an intelligence-report paid for by INE and produced by Henrima Ltd.

In January 2011 Quinn was ordered by the Eastern Caribbean Supreme Court to purchase Marriott's shares in INE and found in breach of his fiduciary duties to INE in a case against Quinn, Morrice and INE. Quinn was ordered to pay costs for the action. Marriott expressed a hope INE would dissociate with Quinn and recover damages by him against shareholders.

A row within INE and subsidiary Belize Natural Energy (BNE) was reported ahead of the 2011 AGM of INE. Belize Prime Minister Dean Barrow urged BNE to ensure oil flow not be disrupted.

When the 3 March 2011 AGM was postponed at short notice, a group of investors held an emergency meeting where Marriott and McCaffrey spoke. McCaffrey said she was "practically destitute and penniless" since being removed as director. The meeting produced a petition calling for the appointment of a receiver for INE. INE had warned the group that the meeting was illegal. A member of Educo, Patricia Fitzpatrick, attempted to dissuade shareholders from attending the meeting and she was asked to leave when she attempted to attend the meeting as she was not a shareholder.

In April 2011 the Cabinet of Belize finalised the petroleum contract for Orange Walk District to rival Maranco. Nevis, parent company for Maranco, was a shareholder in BNE. Maranco was affiliated with PR Marriott Drilling.

In 2012, McCaffrey brought a lawsuit against Quinn and INE, alleging corporate mismanagement. The case was heard in the commercial division of the Eastern Caribbean Supreme Court which heard Quinn claim he had been followed for two years and feared he would be kidnapped and had asked INE for security; INE had paid $2 million in 2008–2010 on security and surveillance.

Quinn claimed that Dialogue Ireland published information about his movements. He agreed with counsel that since the 1970s he had issues with Dialogue Ireland considering Mike Garde as a crank who had no effect on him, until he became involved with INE. Frank Walwyn, lawyer for McCaffrey, said Quinn had been accused of being a Cult leader for a long time before INE.

The court heard that McCaffrey had been removed as Director of INE and her house was searched by Belize Police. She described the interim 5-year period as "a snapshot of the living hell". Quinn claimed a former-member, who was given permission by the Irish High Court to serve a summons by post for a civil-claim against him, and her son had attempted to blackmail him by revealing details of Educo's inner-workings to the press.

Quinn said he has a doctorate in clinical hypnotherapy when responding to questions if he had a PhD or called himself a doctor.

A loan-release scheme had paid Quinn $1.6 million and Morrice $1.15 million the court heard. Quinn earned an additional $1.2 million from oil company staff attending his Educo Seminar. Payments had been made to some shareholders but other shareholders applications to the loan-release scheme had been refused.

The court heard at the 2008 AGM photographs of McCaffrey and others had been projected onto large screens. Morrice denied $286,000 of shareholder money was paid to Henrima Ltd to put McCaffrey under surveillance and the funds were paid for counter-surveillance to understand who was providing information to journalists and posting to websites. Up to eight former soldiers were hired to provide protection for Quinn. Morrice claimed this was under advice from people she asked who recommended she use a company used by Mary Robinson. Robinson has claimed she never used private security when she was president.

It was revealed by Sunday World in 2012 that they had seen a document produced by Henrima Ltd paid for by INE that was a "military-style intelligence file on a number of individuals" including Lalor, McCaffey, Cornec, Joe Duffy, Mike Garde and Nicola Tallant.

A witness for INE changed her evidence when she revised her claim Morrice had given her one copy of the operating agreement of INE when she was in fact given two. Caroline Williams, a Dublin Barrister who had met Quinn in the 1970s at one of this Yoga classes and had attended 4 Educo Seminars, had been paid $904,000 since 2008 by INE. In 2008 she had refused she had a second document when requested by Cornec for a copy saying she had no INE document.

BNE Chief Executive Dr Gilbert Canton told the court 40 staff members had attended the beginners Educo Seminar paying Quinn's companies $718,000 for the seminars and an additional $665,000 for Belize Educogyms since 2007.

Mr Justice Bannister declined to dissolve the company or to order the company to purchase McCaffrey's shares, but granted a declaration that Quinn's appointment to the INE board was invalid and that McCaffrey's suspension from the INE board was invalid. In discussing the hiring of soldiers the judge said "Whatever may have been the need for some personal security, the expenditure was made in very large part for the purposes of Mr Quinn, who appears to have hired what amounted to a private army at the sole expense of INE". In 2012 Sunday World revealed McCaffrey had been included in an intelligence-report paid for by INE and produced by Henrima Ltd.

Mr Justice Bannister described Quinn as "a highly controversial figure both in the Republic of Ireland and further afield. He runs what he calls Educo seminars, which people are persuaded to attend at very high cost." He described Quinn's unique business structure as "no more than advice to promote better employees in preference to inferior ones". A letter alleged to invite Quinn to accept a shareholding was described by the judge as a "clumsy forgery" and an "after-the-event concoction written in an unsuccessful attempt to legitimise the allotment".

In January 2012 Quinn was compelled by Mr Justice Patrick McCarthy of the Irish High Court to give video evidence in a case in the United States District Court for the District of Colorado brought by Cornec who claimed to not be paid fully the amount of $15 million for the sale of shares in INE to Morrice. Morrice counterclaimed that Cornec broke his contract with a campaign of disparagement against Quinn resulting in the loss of a $100 million investment from Dubai.

In July 2012 Mr Justice Gerard Hogan ordered Sunday World journalist Nicola Tallant and Dialogue Ireland director Mike Garde to appear in United States District Court for the District of Colorado to give evidence in the case and adjourned for a month to allow them to apply the orders to be set aside. The court heard how both were "party to communications relevant to the Colorado proceedings." It was claimed Tallant could be urged to reveal the sources for her stories.

In September 2012 the Irish High Court ruled that Nicola Tallant and Mike Garde did not have to give evidence. Mr Justice Gerard Hogan set aside orders saying "if, as she maintains, Mr Quinn holds unorthodox religious views and is effectively the leader of a religious cult which has used psychological techniques as a means of controlling gullible adherents, the media are entitled to educate public opinion in this regard."

In October 2012 a BBC Spotlight programme on the subject of the McCaffrey v Morrice, Quinn and INE case was broadcast. In February 2014 Charles Colville, 5th Viscount Colville of Culross spoke in the House of Lords about the harassment endured by the team behind the programme, with hourly phone calls with threats of defamation and how after broadcast a libel writ issued was dropped after thousands of licence-fee payer funds were paid preparing a defence.

Morrice is the sole founder of INE to remain in position after Mike Usher died. The BNE website has a link to the Educo World website on its website.

=== Educogym ===
Quinn established Educogym, a chain of gyms in Ireland and one in Belize. The Educogym programme involves a ketogenic diet, use of Quinn's dietary supplements, and a "Time Machine" exercise device. Celebrity clients have included singer Robbie Williams, soprano Cara O'Sullivan, and golfer Darren Clarke.

Educogym promotes the Educo Model.

Educogyms in London, Colorado and Los Angeles have closed down.

In 2009, Dr. Crionna Tobin, a PhD student under Dublin City University's Professor Niall Moyna. stated the diet promoted by Educogym would make those undertaking it feel sick, saying it would starve the body. forcing it to operate only on fat, adding that the brain required carbohydrates. Educogym's head of marketing. Jamie Myerscough, said the diet programme was supported by university research but admitted to have never seen the research.

In 2010, the Advertising Standards Authority for Ireland upheld complaints about an advertisement featuring Educo member Ms Ashika Shah stating she had lost 31 pounds using a Quinn weight-loss programme. The authority was also critical of advertisements claiming supplements were available for arthritis, eczema and psoriasis.

In 2015, Educogym was censured by the Advertising Standards Authority for Ireland (ASAI) for advertising a programme to lose 14 pounds in 12 days. The ASAI upheld the complaint that the advertisement "was misleading, as it was unsafe to suggest this weight could be lost in such a short time". The advertisement was withdrawn.

In 2022, currently there is an Educogym operating in the capital city of Belmopan, Belize.

== Religious following ==
The Tony Quinn Centre in Dublin offers prayers to be said by Quinn or his associate Aideen Cowman for a subscription of €30 per month. His operation has been described as a cult.

Journalist June Levine stated that his followers "believe they are reincarnated with him from past lives at the time of Christ." Former devotees have described him as a "master of stagecraft" and stated that they "believed that he was Jesus Christ". Followers are asked by Quinn to kiss his feet; an ex-follower told how members would "jump around, fall off their chairs or flap about on the floor".

In 2009 the Sunday World reported that Quinn has claimed a number of his followers are the reincarnation of biblical figures; Tom McKenna (partner of Quinn's business manager Collette Millea) is the reincarnation of Moses, Margaret Forde is the reincarnation of the Virgin Mary and Mary Power, who "cooks, cleans and works as a personal assistant to Tony, monitoring and sifting through his e-mails and post to sort positive from negative – dumping anything critical", is the reincarnation of Mary Magdalene.

In 2010, it was reported that, a former follower, Maire Lalor, sued Quinn in the Irish High Court for alleged sexual assault and fraud. Human Potential Research Ltd, based in Jersey, was also issued a summons. She has stated she believed Quinn was Jesus Christ. Lalor's civil action alleged "assault and battery; allegedly obtaining money by false pretences; alleged fraudulent misrepresentation, intentional or careless infliction of mental suffering and suborning". In testimony in the McCaffrey lawsuit in 2012, Quinn claimed that Lalor was blackmailing him but it was reported 3 years prior, in 2009, during an AGM for International Natural Energy, photographs of Lalor and her son had been projected onto large screen. In September 2012, Sunday World revealed this ex-follower had been included in an intelligence-report paid for by INE and produced by Henrima Ltd.

Director Jim Sheridan told the Sunday Tribune he met with Quinn to discuss Quinn's screenplay at Quinn's Malahide home. Sheridan said Quinn told him about a vision he had where he was walking on sand and he followed some "Middle eastern people" to the top of a hill where he saw thousands of people listen to Jesus speak "but then he realised it was him".

== Personal life ==
Quinn moved to The Bahamas in the 1990s where he lives on Paradise Island.

His most recent girlfriend Amelie Hattingh (born ca. 1986, 42-years his junior) changed her name to "Eve" after she was introduced to him, having been recruited through his Educo Seminar scheme. Quinn was heard to say "Eve. I presume" when introduced to the new recruit. Hattingh was 19 when she was presented to Quinn, then aged 61, by a follower of Educo and Educo Seminar recruiter in 2005. Hattingh has not been seen publicly with Quinn since 2014.

Quinn also has a Martello tower house in Malahide, Dublin, and a property on Hamhaugh Island, Surrey.
