= Sam Storey =

Northern Irish boxer (born 1963)

Personal information
- Nationality: Northern Irish
- Born: Samuel Storey; 9 August 1963 (age 63) Belfast, Northern Ireland
- Weight: Super Middleweight

Boxing career
- Stance: Southpaw

Boxing record
- Total fights: 31
- Wins: 25
- Win by KO: 12
- Losses: 6
- Draws: 0
- No contests: 0

Samuel Storey (born 9 August 1963 in Belfast, Northern Ireland) is a Northern Irish former professional boxer. Storey fought at Super Middleweight and won the British title in 1995. From Marsden Gardens in the Antrim Road area of north Belfast, Storey was introduced to boxing from an early age by his father, Gerry, the Irish National Coach.

He is the third of three sons and one daughter born to Gerry and Belle. His elder brother, Gerry Junior, who died in January 2025, was also a successful amateur boxer. Acknowledging he was "football-mad", Storey, a useful left-sided midfielder, began at juvenile level for Newington F.C. in the Down and Connor Leagues during the 1970s.

Storey won every age-group amateur boxing title in Ireland at light middleweight for the Holy Family Club. After making his international debut aged 18, he later represented his country in the European, Commonwealth and Olympic Games. He then turned professional at the age of 23 and fought for British, European and World titles against the likes of Chris Eubank and Steve Collins. Storey's successful career saw him win the British title and earn a Lonsdale Belt outright at Super Middleweight. Until losing a British title fight to James Cook in Belfast in October 1990, Storey had been the only boxer ever to hold the Super Middleweight title.

After retiring from the sport in 1997, he worked for Sky Sports and wrote a column for the Sunday People newspaper.

Storey was a businessman for a number of years in his home city until his fast food outlets ceased trading in November 2003 and he was bankrupted. He later regretted moving his successful restaurant from the university area to the Odyssey complex: "With the benefit of hindsight, moving to the Odyssey was definitely a mistake".

Storey is married to Lisa and they moved to Spain in 2007.
