= Nicola Tallant =

Irish investigative journalist

- Born: 1974 (age 51–52)
- Education: College of Commerce, Rathmines
- Occupation: Journalist
- Employer: Sunday World
- Known for: Investigative journalism

Nicola Tallant (born May 1974) is an Irish investigative journalist, specialising in organised crime. She is known for her work at the Sunday World.

== Background ==
Tallant studied at the College of Commerce, Rathmines in the 1990s, graduating with a certificate in journalism. She undertook work experience at the Southside News and the Evening Press newspapers. Tallant has a higher diploma in criminology.

== Career ==
Tallant began her career with local newspapers, working part-time as a waitress. She later worked shifts at the Evening Herald, the Irish Independent, and the Irish Daily Star. At the age of 26, Tallant was appointed News Editor at the Irish Daily Mirror, from 1999 to 2001. From 2001 to 2008, she was co-owner of News Ireland news agency. She began working for the Sunday World in 2008. Since 2010, Tallant has been Investigations Editor at the Sunday World. She has been awarded Irish Crime Journalist of the Year three times.

Since November 2020, she has hosted, edited, and produced the weekly Crime World podcast. In May 2021, she released a 10-part podcast on Acast called The Witness: In His Own Words, based on her best-selling book The Witness. The Witness was named Podcast of the Year at the 2021 Irish Journalism Awards and the 2021 Digital Media Awards.

In October 2022 it was reported Tallant's Crime World podcast was listened to over 1 million times in a month.

== Bibliography ==
- Groomed: Coercion, Control and a Cold-blooded Murder (2025)
- Clash of the Clans: The Rise of the Kinahan Mafia and Boxing's Dirty Secret (2021)
- The Witness (2020)
