= Clinton Woods =

British boxer (born 1972)

Personal information
- Nickname: Clint
- Nationality: British
- Born: 1 May 1972 (age 54) Sheffield, West Riding of Yorkshire, England
- Height: 6 ft 2 in (188 cm)
- Weight: Super-middleweight; Light-heavyweight

Boxing career
- Reach: 76 in (193 cm)
- Stance: Orthodox

Boxing record
- Total fights: 48
- Wins: 42
- Win by KO: 24
- Losses: 5
- Draws: 1

Clinton Woods (born 1 May 1972) is a British former professional boxer who competed from 1994 to 2009, and held the IBF light-heavyweight title from 2005 to 2008. At regional level he held the Commonwealth super-middleweight title from 1997 to 1998, the British light-heavyweight title from 1999 to 2000, and the European and Commonwealth light-heavyweight titles from 1999 to 2001.

== Early life ==
Woods was born in Sheffield, England.

== Career ==
Woods started his professional career with a points win over Dave Proctor in his home town of Sheffield. After compiling a record of 13–0 he stepped in with Craig Joseph and beat him over 10 rounds to win the Central Area super middleweight title. After a series of victories, Woods, with a record of 18–0, fought for the vacant Commonwealth belt against Mark Baker, who had a record of 20–1. Woods won the fight and claimed the belt with a 12-round points decision.

In his next fight the unbeaten Woods found himself opposite former British champion David Starie. The fight ended in a first defeat for Woods.

Woods bounced back from the Starie defeat by moving up a weight division to light heavyweight and winning his next two fights before landing a shot at fellow Yorkshireman and current holder of the British, Commonwealth and European light-heavyweight titles Crawford Ashley. Woods knocked out Ashley in the eighth round to capture the three belts.

He ended up defending his Commonwealth and European titles twice each and adding the WBC International light-heavyweight title to his résumé. The latter victory being for a WBC strap, when Woods set himself up for an eliminator for the full WBC light heavyweight title. The fight took place in Sheffield, in September 2001. Woods beat the experienced Italian–Ugandan Yawe Davis in a unanimous decision that would allow him to attempt a world title.

=== World title fights ===
Clinton travelled to the United States for his big chance in September 2002. He stepped into the ring at the Rose Garden in Oregon to oppose Roy Jones, with the WBC, WBA, and IBF titles on the line. Woods lost after being stopped in the sixth round and later said that he wasn't really ready for a fight of that magnitude.

Woods rebuilt from the defeat by Jones with three straight wins and then found himself in the ring with Glen Johnson. His second world title attempt was for the IBF belt and took place in November 2003 at Sheffield's Hillsborough Leisure Centre and the fight ended in a draw. Three months later in February 2004 the two met once again in Sheffield this time at the Ponds Forge Centre, the result this time going Johnson's way after 12 rounds.

=== IBF champion ===
In his next fight Woods found himself in an IBF title eliminator. Eight months after his defeat to Johnson, Woods took on the Australian Jason DeLisle at the Octagon Centre in Sheffield. He won the fight despite being put down in the first round and set himself up for world title fight number 4. The title was vacant again and this time Woods found himself in the ring with undefeated American Rico Hoye. The fight took place in Rotherham and ended with Woods winning on a technical knockout (T.K.O.) when the referee stopped the fight in the fifth round.

In September 2005 at the Hallam FM Arena, Sheffield, Yorkshire, Woods defeated mandatory challenger and former WBO and Lineal champion Julio César González via a clear unanimous decision. A successful voluntary defence against DeLisle followed, before Woods fought Jamaican Glen Johnson for a third time. In the ninth round Woods sustained heavy punishment to the head at the hands of Johnson, but fought back to win the subsequent rounds. The American judge, Richard Bays scored the fight 115–112 in favour of Woods, Mickey Vann scored the contest 115–113 in favour of Johnson and Roberto Ramírez 116–112 scored in favour of Woods. It was a split decision but Woods had defeated the man who beat him in 2004.

In September 2007, Woods again successfully defended his IBF title against Julio César González with a unanimous decision.

=== Defeat and comeback ===
In April 2008 at St. Pete Times Forum, Tampa, Florida in the United States, Woods gave a lacklustre display against American Antonio Tarver and lost his IBF title. Tarver out-boxed the Sheffield man on the way to a comfortable points victory. Following the defeat, a dejected Woods hinted that he may quit the sport. A change of trainer followed, with Woods replacing Richard Poxon for Glyn Rhodes. The change seemed to have paid off when on 14 February 2009 Woods travelled to the Channel Island of Jersey to defeat Kosovar-Albanian fighter Elvir Muriqi in an eliminator match for his old IBF title.

== Retirement ==
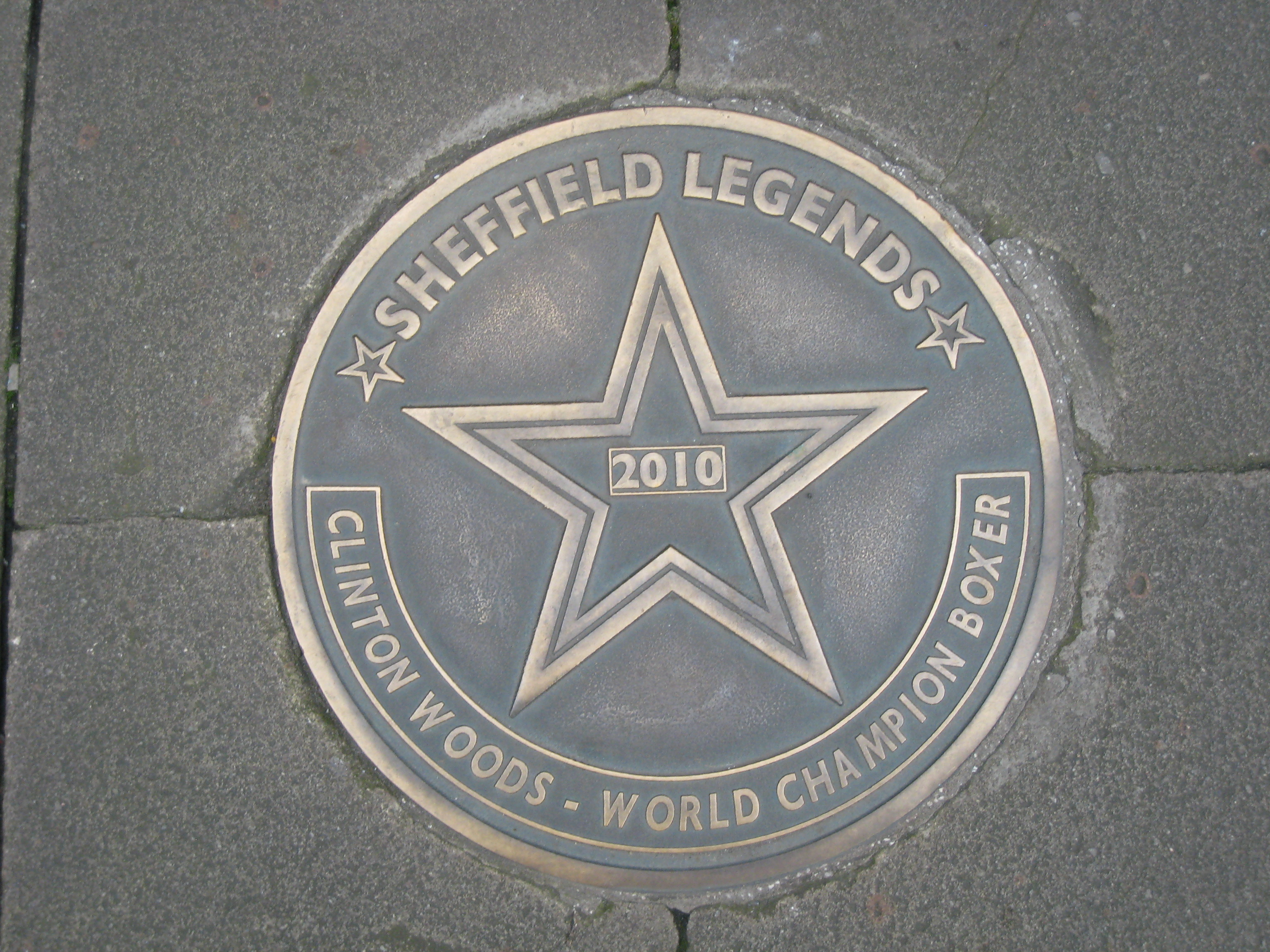
Star on the Walk of Fame outside Sheffield Town Hall

In August 2009, Woods once more fought on the world stage when he again travelled to Florida, to challenge Tavoris Cloud for the then-vacant IBF title. Woods went on to lose a 12-round decision. When asked about retirement after the defeat, Woods said "To be honest, the thought of that upsets me more than losing the world title, retiring from the sport I love". However, Woods announced his retirement from boxing on 8 September 2009.

== Professional boxing record ==
48 fights	42 wins	5 losses
By knockout	25	1
By decision	17	4
Draws	1	

No.	Result	Record	Opponent	Type	Round, time	Date	Location	Notes
48	Loss	42–5–1	Tavoris Cloud	UD	12	28 Aug 2009	Hard Rock Live, Hollywood, Florida, US	For vacant IBF light-heavyweight title
47	Win	42–4–1	Elvir Muriqi	UD	12	14 Feb 2009	Hotel de France, Jersey, Channel Islands	
46	Loss	41–4–1	Antonio Tarver	UD	12	12 Apr 2008	St. Pete Times Forum, Tampa, Florida, US	Lost IBF light-heavyweight title; For IBO light-heavyweight title
45	Win	41–3–1	Julio César González	UD	12	29 Sep 2007	Sheffield Arena, Sheffield, England	Retained IBF light-heavyweight title
44	Win	40–3–1	Glen Johnson	SD	12	2 Sep 2006	Bolton Arena, Bolton, England	Retained IBF light-heavyweight title
43	Win	39–3–1	Jason DeLisle	TKO	6 (12)	13 May 2006	Ponds Forge, Sheffield, England	Retained IBF light-heavyweight title
42	Win	38–3–1	Julio César González	UD	12	9 Sep 2005	Sheffield Arena, Sheffield, England	Retained IBF light-heavyweight title
41	Win	37–3–1	Rico Hoye	TKO	5 (12), 2:59	4 Mar 2005	Magna Science Adventure Centre, Rotherham, England	Won vacant IBF light-heavyweight title
40	Win	36–3–1	Jason DeLisle	TKO	12 (12), 1:50	24 Oct 2004	Octagon Centre, Sheffield, England	
39	Loss	35–3–1	Glen Johnson	UD	12	6 Feb 2004	Ponds Forge, Sheffield, England	For vacant IBF light-heavyweight title
38	Draw	35–2–1	Glen Johnson	SD	12	7 Nov 2003	Hillsborough Leisure Centre, Sheffield, England	For vacant IBF light-heavyweight title
37	Win	35–2	Demetrius Jenkins	TKO	7 (10), 2:26	10 Jun 2003	Ponds Forge, Sheffield, England	
36	Win	34–2	Arturo Rivera	TKO	2 (10), 0:49	18 Mar 2003	Rivermead Leisure Centre, Reading, England	
35	Win	33–2	Sergio Martin Beaz	TKO	3 (10), 1:40	24 Jan 2003	Ponds Forge, Sheffield, England	
34	Loss	32–2	Roy Jones Jr.	TKO	6 (12)	7 Sep 2002	Rose Garden, Portland, Oregon, US	For WBA (Super), WBC, IBF, IBO, IBA, WBF, and The Ring light-heavyweight titles
33	Win	32–1	Clint Johnson	TKO	3	16 Mar 2002	York Hall, London, England	
32	Win	31–1	Yawe Davis	UD	12	13 Sep 2001	Ponds Forge, Sheffield, England	
31	Win	30–1	Paul Bonson	PTS	6	27 Jul 2001	Don Valley Stadium, Sheffield, England	
30	Win	29–1	Ali Forbes	RTD	10 (12), 3:00	24 Mar 2001	Ponds Forge, Sheffield, England	Won vacant WBC International light-heavyweight title
29	Win	28–1	Greg Scott Briggs	TKO	3 (10)	15 Jul 2000	London Arena, London, England	
28	Win	27–1	Ole Klemetsen	TKO	9 (12)	29 Apr 2000	Wembley Arena, London, England	Retained European light-heavyweight title
27	Win	26–1	Juan Nelongo	UD	12	12 Feb 2000	Ponds Forge, Sheffield, England	Retained European light-heavyweight title
26	Win	25–1	Terry Ford	TKO	4	10 Dec 1999	Warsaw, Poland	
25	Win	24–1	John Lennox Lewis	KO	10 (12), 2:29	11 Sep 1999	Hillsborough Leisure Centre, Sheffield, England	Retained Commonwealth light-heavyweight title
24	Win	23–1	Sam Leuii	TKO	6 (12), 2:37	10 Jul 1999	Elephant and Castle Shopping Centre, London, England	Retained Commonwealth light-heavyweight title
23	Win	22–1	Crawford Ashley	TKO	8 (12), 1:38	13 Mar 1999	Bowlers Exhibition Centre, Manchester, England	Won European, British, and Commonwealth light-heavyweight titles
22	Win	21–1	Mark Smallwood	TKO	7 (8), 2:19	30 Nov 1998	Bowlers Exhibition Centre, Manchester, England	
21	Win	20–1	Peter Mason	RTD	4 (6), 3:00	18 Jun 1998	Grosvenor House Hotel, Sheffield, England	
20	Loss	19–1	David Starie	PTS	12	28 Mar 1998	Hull Arena, Hull, England	Lost Commonwealth super-middleweight title
19	Win	19–0	Mark Baker	PTS	12	6 Dec 1997	Wembley Arena, London, England	Won vacant Commonwealth super-middleweight title
18	Win	18–0	Jeff Finlayson	PTS	8	26 Nov 1997	Grosvenor House Hotel, Sheffield, England	
17	Win	17–0	Danny Juma	PTS	8	25 Oct 1997	Deeside Leisure Centre, Queensferry, Wales	
16	Win	16–0	Darren Ashton	PTS	6	26 Jun 1997	Pinegrove Country Club, Sheffield, England	
15	Win	15–0	Darren Littlewood	TKO	6 (10), 1:41	10 Apr 1997	Pinegrove Country Club, Sheffield, England	Retained British Central Area super-middleweight title
14	Win	14–0	Steve Shelley	TKO	2 (4), 2:24	20 Feb 1997	Leisure Centre, Mansfield, England	
13	Win	13–0	Craig Joseph	PTS	10	14 Nov 1996	Pinegrove Country Club, Sheffield, England	Won vacant British Central Area super-middleweight title
12	Win	12–0	Ernie Loveridge	PTS	6	13 Jun 1996	Pinegrove Country Club, Sheffield, England	
11	Win	11–0	John Duckworth	PTS	8	16 Mar 1996	Pinegrove Country Club, Sheffield, England	
10	Win	10–0	Chris Walker	TKO	6 (6)	5 Feb 1996	Norfolk Gardens Hotel, Bradford, England	
9	Win	9–0	Andy Ewen	TKO	3	22 Nov 1995	Hillsborough Leisure Centre, Sheffield, England	
8	Win	8–0	Phil Ball	TKO	4	20 Oct 1995	Leisure Centre, Mansfield, England	
7	Win	7–0	Paul Murray	PTS	6	21 Sep 1995	Hillsborough Leisure Centre, Sheffield, England	
6	Win	6–0	Kevin Burton	TKO	6 (6), 1:02	16 Jun 1995	Variety Club, Batley, England	
5	Win	5–0	Kevin Burton	PTS	6	16 May 1995	Winter Gardens, Cleethorpes, England	
4	Win	4–0	Japhet Hans	TKO	3 (6), 1:59	6 Apr 1995	Pinegrove Country Club, Sheffield, England	
3	Win	3–0	Paul Clarkson	TKO	1	23 Feb 1995	Quality Royal Hotel, Cottingham, England	
2	Win	2–0	Earl Ling	TKO	5 (6)	12 Dec 1994	Winter Gardens, Cleethorpes, England	
1	Win	1–0	Dave Proctor	PTS	6	17 Nov 1994	Pinegrove Country Club, Sheffield, England	

Sporting positions
Regional boxing titles
Vacant Title last held by Glenn Campbell	British Central Area super-middleweight champion 14 November 1996 – December 1997; Vacated	Vacant Title next held by Mike Gormley
Vacant Title last held by Henry Wharton	Commonwealth super-middleweight champion 7 December 1997 – 28 March 2998	Succeeded by David Starie
Preceded by Crawford Ashley	European light-heavyweight champion 13 March 1999 – March 2001; Vacated	Vacant Title next held by Yawe Davis
Preceded by Crawford Ashley	British light-heavyweight champion 13 March 1999 – May 2000; Vacated	Vacant Title next held by Neil Simpson
Preceded by Crawford Ashley	Commonwealth light-heavyweight champion 13 March 1999 – January 2001; Vacated	Vacant Title next held by Neil Simpson
Vacant Title last held by Yawe Davis	WBC International light-heavyweight champion 24 March 2001 – April 2001; Vacated	Vacant Title next held by Dzhabrail Dzhabrailov
World boxing titles
Vacant Title last held by Glen Johnson	IBF light-heavyweight champion 4 March 2005 – 12 April 2008	Succeeded by Antonio Tarver
