= Tony Booth (boxer) =

British boxer

Personal information
- Born: 30 January 1970 (age 56) Kingston upon Hull, East Riding of Yorkshire, England
- Height: 5 ft 11 1/2 in (182 cm)
- Weight: Super-middleweight; Light-heavyweight; Cruiserweight

Boxing career
- Stance: Orthodox

Boxing record
- Total fights: 166
- Wins: 52
- Win by KO: 12
- Losses: 105
- Draws: 9

Tony Booth (born 30 January 1970) is a British former professional boxer who competed from 1990 to 2008. At regional level, he challenged once for the Commonwealth cruiserweight title in 1994, and once for the British and Commonwealth light-heavyweight titles in 1998. During his career, Booth held the record for the most wins of any active British professional boxer.

== Professional career ==
Booth faced Ralf Rocchigiani in Berlin on 1 May 1993, fighting to an eight-round draw. The following month, Booth faced former world super-middleweight champion Víctor Córdoba in Marseille, losing a points decision (PTS).

Booth challenged Franco Wanyama on 28 January 1994, for the vacant Commonwealth cruiserweight title, losing by technical knockout in the second round.

Booth faced light-heavyweight contender Montell Griffin on 4 June 1995, losing by TKO in the second round.

Booth faced former two-time world cruiserweight title challenger Johnny Nelson on 20 January 1996, losing by knockout (KO) in the second round.

Booth challenged Crawford Ashley on 9 June 1998, for the British and vacant Commonwealth light-heavyweight titles, losing by TKO in the sixth round. Following his loss to Ashley, Booth defeated undefeated American boxer Omar Sheika (14–0, 9 KOs), by PTS.

Booth faced undefeated cruiserweight Firat Arslan in London on 31 October 2000, losing by TKO in the second round.

Booth faced Enzo Maccarinelli at the International Arena in Cardiff on 20 April 2002, losing on PTS, by 40–36. Booth faced Maccarinelli for the second time at the Cardiff Castle on 17 August, losing by TKO in the second round.

Booth faced World Amateur Championships silver medalist David Haye at the York Hall in London on 8 December 2002, in what was Haye's professional debut, losing by corner retirement in the second round.

Booth faced undefeated heavyweight Derek Chisora at the Millennium Stadium in Cardiff on 7 April 2007, on the undercard of Joe Calzaghe's successful WBO super-middleweight title defence against Peter Manfredo Jr., losing on PTS, by 40–36.

== Life after boxing ==
In 2012, Booth was jailed for drug offences.

== Personal life ==
In 2006, Setanta Sports broadcast a documentary on Booth's career, I could have been a Contender. In 2008, Booth published his autobiography, Boxing Booth.

== Professional boxing record ==
166 fights	52 wins	105 losses
By knockout	12	38
By decision	40	67
Draws	9	

No.	Result	Record	Opponent	Type	Round, time	Date	Location	Notes
166	Win	52–105–9	Raz Parnez	RTD	4 (6), 3:00	1 Nov 2008	Thistle Hotel, Glasgow, Scotland	
165	Win	51–105–9	Howard Daley	PTS	6	11 Oct 2008	City Hall, Hull, England	
164	Loss	50–105–9	Howard Daley	RTD	2 (6), 3:00	14 Mar 2008	Old Trafford, Manchester, England	
163	Loss	50–104–9	Neil Simpson	PTS	4	1 Mar 2008	Leofric Hotel, Coventry, England	
162	Loss	50–103–9	David Dolan	TKO	3 (6), 1:45	23 Nov 2007	Rainton Meadows Arena, Sunderland, England	
161	Loss	50–102–9	Ben Harding	PTS	4	9 Nov 2007	Guid Hall, Plymouth, England	
160	Loss	50–101–9	Ali Adams	PTS	4	19 Oct 2007	Millennium Hotel, London, England	
159	Loss	50–100–9	Neil Simpson	PTS	10	25 Sep 2007	City Hall, Hull, England	
158	Loss	50–99–9	Tom Owens	PTS	4	13 Jul 2007	Holiday Inn, Birmingham, England	
157	Loss	50–98–9	Troy Ross	TKO	2 (8), 1:52	18 May 2007	ExCeL, London, England	
156	Loss	50–97–9	Paulino da Silva	PTS	6	21 Apr 2007	Jarvis Hotel, Manchester, England	
155	Loss	50–96–9	Derek Chisora	PTS	4	7 Apr 2007	Millennium Stadium, Cardiff, Wales	
154	Win	50–95–9	Billy Wilson	TKO	5 (6), 0:29	23 Feb 2007	Doncaster Dome, Doncaster, England	
153	Loss	49–95–9	JJ Ojuederie	PTS	4	3 Dec 2006	York Hall, London, England	
152	Loss	49–94–9	Leigh Alliss	PTS	4	3 Nov 2006	Dolman Exhibition Hall, Bristol, England	
151	Win	49–93–9	Danny Tombs	PTS	4	21 Oct 2006	Elephant & Castle Centre, London, England	
150	Win	48–93–9	O'Neil Murray	PTS	4	9 Oct 2006	Civic Hall, Bedworth, England	
149	Win	47–93–9	Mervyn Langdale	TKO	1 (4), 1:52	24 Sep 2006	Guildhall, Southampton, England	
148	Loss	46–93–9	Tommy Eastwood	PTS	4	23 Jul 2006	Goresbrook Leisure Centre, London, England	
147	Loss	46–92–9	Ervis Jegeni	PTS	4	12 Jul 2006	York Hall, London, England	
146	Win	46–91–9	Lee Mountford	PTS	6	26 May 2006	Hull & District Sporting Club, Hull, England	
145	Loss	45–91–9	Paul Souter	PTS	4	13 May 2006	York Hall, London, England	
144	Loss	45–90–9	Ervis Jegeni	TKO	1 (4), 2:58	30 Mar 2006	Cafe Royal, London, England	
143	Loss	45–89–9	Jon Ibbotson	PTS	4	5 Mar 2006	Octagon Centre, Sheffield, England	
142	Loss	45–88–9	Ovill McKenzie	PTS	4	26 Feb 2006	Goresbrook Leisure Centre, London, England	
141	Draw	45–87–9	Dave Clarke	PTS	6	25 Nov 2005	K.C. Sports Arena, Hull, England	
140	Loss	45–87–8	Tommy Eastwood	PTS	4	6 Oct 2005	Thistle Heathrow Hotel, London, England	
139	Loss	45–86–8	Carl Wright	PTS	4	24 Sep 2005	Leofric Hotel, Coventry, England	
138	Loss	45–85–8	Darren Morgan	PTS	4	10 Sep 2005	International Arena, Cardiff, Wales	
137	Loss	45–84–8	Coleman Barrett	PTS	4	27 Jul 2005	Equinox Nightclub, London, England	
136	Loss	45–83–8	Martin Rogan	TKO	2 (4), 2:27	4 Jun 2005	MEN Arena, Manchester, England	
135	Loss	45–82–8	Johny Jensen	UD	6	15 Apr 2005	K.B. Hallen, Copenhagen, Denmark	
134	Loss	45–81–8	Junior MacDonald	PTS	4	5 Mar 2005	Elephant & Castle Centre, London, England	
133	Loss	45–80–8	Hovik Keuchkerian	KO	1 (8)	11 Dec 2004	Madrid, Spain	
132	Win	45–79–8	Paul Bonson	PTS	6	26 Nov 2004	K.C. Sports Arena, Hull, England	
131	Loss	44–79–8	Bash Ali	TKO	4 (12)	15 Aug 2004	National Stadium, Lagos, Nigeria	
130	Loss	44–78–8	Elvis Mihailenko	RTD	4 (6), 3:00	1 May 2004	Woodville Hall, Gravesend, England	
129	Win	44–77–8	O'Neil Murray	PTS	8	14 Feb 2004	New Connaught Rooms, London, England	
128	Win	43–77–8	Paul Bonson	PTS	6	14 Nov 2003	Willerby Manor Hotel, Hull, England	
127	Win	42–77–8	Radcliffe Green	PTS	6	29 Sep 2003	Britannia International Hotel, London, England	
126	Loss	41–77–8	Kelly Oliver	PTS	4	26 Jul 2003	The Pavilions, Plymouth, England	
125	Loss	41–76–8	Tony Moran	PTS	6	17 May 2003	Everton Park Sports Centre, Liverpool, England	
124	Loss	41–75–8	Jason Callum	PTS	6	5 Apr 2003	Leofric Hotel, Coventry, England	
123	Loss	41–74–8	Mohamed Ben Guesmia	TKO	4 (8)	30 Jan 2003	Salle Omnisports, Annaba, Algeria	
122	Loss	41–73–8	David Haye	RTD	2 (4), 3:00	8 Dec 2002	York Hall, London, England	
121	Loss	41–72–8	Roman Greenberg	PTS	4	28 Nov 2002	Kinloss Suite, London, England	
120	Win	41–71–8	Jamie Warters	PTS	8	21 Nov 2002	City Hall, Hull, England	
119	Loss	40–71–8	Hughie Docherty	PTS	4	27 Oct 2002	Elephant & Castle Centre, London, England	
118	Loss	40–70–8	James Zikic	PTS	4	19 Oct 2002	Sports Village, Norwich, England	
117	Win	40–69–8	Phill Day	PTS	4	5 Oct 2002	AT7 Centre, Coventry, England	
116	Win	39–69–8	Alvin Miller	PTS	6	23 Sep 2002	Winter Gardens, Cleethorpes, England	
115	Loss	38–69–8	Enzo Maccarinelli	TKO	2 (4), 1:51	17 Aug 2002	Cardiff Castle, Cardiff, Wales	
114	Loss	38–68–8	Mark Krence	PTS	4	3 Aug 2002	Derby Storm Arena, Derby, England	
113	Loss	38–67–8	Neil Linford	TKO	5 (6), 1:07	23 Jun 2002	Elephant & Castle Centre, London, England	
112	Loss	38–66–8	Paul Buttery	PTS	4	10 May 2002	Leyland Leisure Centre, Preston, England	
111	Win	38–65–8	Scott Lansdowne	TKO	4 (4), 2:16	28 Apr 2002	Elephant & Castle Centre, London, England	
110	Loss	37–65–8	Enzo Maccarinelli	PTS	4	20 Apr 2002	International Arena, Cardiff, Wales	
109	Loss	37–64–8	John McDermott	TKO	1 (6), 2:46	19 Jan 2002	York Hall, London, England	
108	Loss	37–63–8	Blue Stevens	PTS	4	16 Dec 2001	Elephant & Castle Centre, London, England	
107	Loss	37–62–8	Matt Legg	PTS	4	24 Nov 2001	York Hall, London, England	
106	Win	37–61–8	Terry Morrill	TKO	7 (8)	1 Nov 2001	City Hall, Hull, England	
105	Loss	36–61–8	Colin Kenna	PTS	6	15 Oct 2001	Guildhall, Southampton, England	
104	Loss	36–60–8	Peter Haymer	PTS	4	22 Sep 2001	York Hall, London, England	
103	Loss	36–59–8	Tommy Eastwood	PTS	4	9 Sep 2001	Elephant & Castle Centre, London, England	
102	Loss	36–58–8	Butch Lesley	TKO	3 (8), 1:53	16 Jun 2001	Goresbrook Leisure Centre, London, England	
101	Loss	36–57–8	Mark Baker	PTS	4	10 Apr 2001	Conference Centre, London, England	
100	Draw	36–56–8	Kenny Gayle	PTS	4	1 Apr 2001	Elephant & Castle Centre, London, England	
99	Loss	36–56–7	Denzil Browne	TKO	5 (10), 2:15	5 Feb 2001	City Hall, Hull, England	For vacant Central Area cruiserweight title
98	Loss	36–55–7	Mark Krence	PTS	6	11 Dec 2000	Holiday Inn Hotel, Sheffield, England	
97	Loss	36–54–7	Firat Arslan	TKO	2 (6)	31 Oct 2000	Novotel Hotel, London, England	
96	Loss	36–53–7	Rob Norton	TKO	3 (6), 2:59	30 Sep 2000	Bushfield Leisure Centre, Peterborough, England	
95	Win	36–52–7	Dominic Negus	PTS	6	8 Sep 2000	Whitchurch Leisure Centre, Bristol, England	
94	Loss	35–52–7	Toks Owoh	TKO	3 (8)	19 Jun 2000	Meadowside Leisure Centre, Burton upon Trent, England	
93	Win	35–51–7	Michael Pinnock	PTS	6	15 May 2000	Winter Gardens, Cleethorpes, England	
92	Win	34–51–7	Greg Scott Briggs	PTS	10	9 Apr 2000	Leisure Centre, Alfreton, England	
91	Loss	33–51–7	John Keeton	TKO	2 (4)	29 Feb 2000	Kingsway Leisure Centre, Widnes, England	
90	Loss	33–50–7	Thomas Hansvoll	PTS	6	12 Feb 2000	Ponds Forge, Sheffield, England	
89	Loss	33–49–7	Michael Sprott	PTS	6	18 Jan 2000	Leisure Centre, Mansfield, England	
88	Loss	33–48–7	Cathal O'Grady	KO	4 (6)	16 Oct 1999	Maysfield Leisure Centre, Belfast, Northern Ireland	
87	Win	33–47–7	Adam Cale	PTS	6	27 Sep 1999	Winter Gardens, Cleethorpes, England	
86	Loss	32–47–7	Neil Simpson	PTS	10	12 Jul 1999	Ryton Sports Connexion, Coventry, England	
85	Win	32–46–7	Darren Ashton	PTS	6	17 May 1999	Winter Gardens, Cleethorpes, England	
84	Loss	31–46–7	Ali Saidi	TKO	4 (8)	5 Jan 1999	Épernay, France	
83	Win	31–45–7	Sven Hamer	PTS	6	14 Dec 1998	Winter Gardens, Cleethorpes, England	
82	Win	30–45–7	Nigel Rafferty	PTS	8	29 Oct 1998	Hilton Hotel, London, England	
81	Loss	29–45–7	Toks Owoh	PTS	6	26 Sep 1998	Sports Village, Norwich, England	
80	Win	29–44–7	Omar Sheika	PTS	8	18 Jul 1998	Sheffield Arena, Sheffield, England	
79	Loss	28–44–7	Crawford Ashley	TKO	6 (12), 1:41	9 Jun 1998	Hull Arena, Hull, England	For British, and vacant Commonwealth light-heavyweight titles
78	Win	28–43–7	Peter Mason	TKO	3 (6), 2:11	6 Mar 1998	Ennerdale Leisure Centre, Hull, England	
77	Win	27–43–7	Nigel Rafferty	PTS	6	15 Dec 1997	Winter Gardens, Cleethorpes, England	
76	Win	26–43–7	Martin Jolley	PTS	6	28 Nov 1997	Country Park Inn, Hull, England	
75	Win	25–43–7	Bruce Scott	PTS	8	4 Oct 1997	Alexandra Palace, London, England	
74	Win	24–43–7	Martin Langtry	PTS	6	22 Sep 1997	Winter Gardens, Cleethorpes, England	
73	Loss	23–43–7	Steve Bristow	PTS	4	11 Sep 1997	Kingsway Leisure Centre, Widnes, England	
72	Win	23–42–7	Phill Day	PTS	4	15 May 1997	Rivermead Leisure Centre, Reading, England	
71	Loss	22–42–7	Robert Norton	TKO	4 (8), 2:35	16 Apr 1997	York Hall, London, England	
70	Loss	22–41–7	John Wilson	PTS	6	4 Apr 1997	Thistle Hotel, Glasgow, Scotland	
69	Draw	22–40–7	Nigel Rafferty	PTS	8	25 Mar 1997	Park Hall Hotel & Spa, Wolverhampton, England	
68	Loss	22–40–6	Kevin Morton	PTS	6	27 Feb 1997	Royal Hotel Hull, Hull, England	
67	Loss	22–39–6	Kelly Oliver	TKO	4 (6), 0:25	18 Jan 1997	Green Bank Leisure Centre, Swadlincote, England	
66	Loss	22–38–6	Crawford Ashley	TKO	1 (8)	11 Dec 1996	The Castle Centre, London, England	
65	Win	22–37–6	Alvin Miller	TKO	5 (6)	22 Nov 1996	Country Park Inn, Hull, England	
64	Win	21–37–6	Martin Jolley	PTS	4	6 Nov 1996	Hull Arena, Hull, England	
63	Loss	20–37–6	Kelly Oliver	TKO	2 (6)	14 Sep 1996	Concord Centre, Sheffield, England	
62	Loss	20–36–6	Paul Douglas	PTS	4	3 Sep 1996	Ulster Hall, Belfast, Northern Ireland	
61	Loss	20–35–6	Bruce Scott	PTS	8	13 Jul 1996	York Hall, London, England	
60	Win	20–34–6	Mark Richardson	TKO	2 (6)	17 May 1996	Quality Royal Hotel, Hull, England	
59	Loss	19–34–6	Neil Simpson	PTS	6	27 Mar 1996	Hermitage Leisure Centre, Whitwick, England	
58	Win	19–33–6	Alvin Miller	PTS	6	15 Mar 1996	Country Park Inn, Hull, England	
57	Loss	18–33–6	Johnny Nelson	KO	2 (6), 2:07	20 Jan 1996	Leisure Centre, Mansfield, England	
56	Loss	18–32–6	John Marceta	TKO	2 (8), 2:12	16 Dec 1995	Welsh Institute of Sport, Cardiff, Wales	
55	Loss	18–31–6	Bruce Scott	TKO	3 (8), 2:07	11 Nov 1995	North Bridge Leisure Centre, Halifax, England	
54	Loss	18–30–6	Don Diego Poeder	TKO	2 (8)	6 Oct 1995	Waregem, Belgium	
53	Win	18–29–6	Neil Simpson	PTS	8	25 Sep 1995	Winter Gardens, Cleethorpes, England	
52	Loss	17–29–6	Leif Keiski	PTS	8	6 Sep 1995	Helsinki, Finland	
51	Loss	17–28–6	Mark Prince	TKO	2 (8)	22 Jul 1995	London Arena, London, England	
50	Win	17–27–6	Nigel Rafferty	TKO	7 (8), 0:45	6 Jul 1995	Ennerdale Leisure Centre, Hull, England	
49	Loss	16–27–6	Montell Griffin	TKO	2 (10)	4 Jun 1995	York Hall, London, England	
48	Win	16–26–6	Art Stacey	PTS	10	27 Apr 1995	Quality Royal Hotel, Hull, England	Won vacant Central Area cruiserweight title
47	Loss	15–26–6	John Foreman	PTS	6	7 Mar 1995	Tower Ballroom, Birmingham, England	
46	Loss	15–25–6	Jan Lefeber	PTS	8	23 Jan 1995	Beurs-World Trade Center, Rotterdam, Netherlands	
45	Loss	15–24–6	Dean Francis	KO	1 (8), 2:51	27 Oct 1994	Royal Lancaster Hotel, London, England	
44	Loss	15–23–6	Dirk Wallyn	PTS	6	7 Oct 1994	Waregem, Belgium	
43	Loss	15–22–6	John Held	PTS	8	24 Sep 1994	Rotterdam Ahoy, Rotterdam, Netherlands	
42	Loss	15–21–6	Mark Prince	TKO	3 (8)	21 Jul 1994	Town Hall, London, England	
41	Loss	15–20–6	Torsten May	UD	6	23 Mar 1994	Westfalenhallen, Dortmund, Germany	
40	Loss	15–19–6	Franco Wanyama	TKO	2 (12)	28 Jan 1994	Waregem, Belgium	For vacant Commonwealth cruiserweight title
39	Win	15–18–6	Carlos Christie	PTS	6	12 Nov 1993	Ennardale Leisure Centre, Hull, England	
38	Loss	14–18–6	James Cook	PTS	8	2 Nov 1993	Elephant & Castle Centre, London, England	
37	Draw	14–17–6	Denzil Browne	PTS	8	7 Oct 1993	York Barbican, York, England	
36	Loss	14–17–5	Ole Klemetsen	UD	8	17 Sep 1993	Cirkusbygningen, Copenhagen, Denmark	
35	Loss	14–16–5	Michael Gale	PTS	8	1 Jul 1993	York Barbican, York, England	
34	Win	14–15–5	Tony Behan	PTS	6	23 Jun 1993	Ocean Rooms, Norfolk, England	
33	Loss	13–15–5	Víctor Córdoba	PTS	8	3 Jun 1993	Palais des Sports, Marseille, France	
32	Draw	13–14–5	Ralf Rocchigiani	PTS	8	1 May 1993	Sporthalle Charlottenburg, Berlin, Germany	
31	Win	13–14–4	Tony Wilson	PTS	8	9 Feb 1993	Park Hall Hotel, Wolverhampton, England	
30	Loss	12–14–4	Franco Wanyama	PTS	6	25 Dec 1992	Izegem, Belgium	
29	Draw	12–13–4	Tony Wilson	PTS	8	18 Nov 1992	Civic Hall, Solihull, England	
28	Draw	12–13–3	Roy Ritchie	PTS	6	30 Oct 1992	Istres, France	
27	Loss	12–13–2	James Cook	PTS	8	7 Sep 1992	York Hall, London, England	
26	Loss	12–12–2	Maurice Core	PTS	6	18 Aug 1992	Free Trade Hall, Manchester, England	
25	Loss	12–11–2	Eddy Smulders	TKO	1 (8)	2 Jun 1992	Weenahal, Rotterdam, Netherlands	
24	Win	12–10–2	Phil Soundy	PTS	6	13 May 1992	Royal Albert Hall, London, England	
23	Loss	11–10–2	Michael Gale	PTS	8	8 Apr 1992	Town Hall, Leeds, England	
22	Win	11–9–2	Dave Owens	PTS	6	26 Mar 1992	Willerby Manor Hotel, Hull, England	
21	Win	10–9–2	John Beckles	TKO	6 (6)	5 Mar 1992	Town Hall, London, England	
20	Win	9–9–2	Tenko Ernie	TKO	4 (6)	12 Feb 1992	Grand Hall, London, England	
19	Win	8–9–2	Serg Fame	PTS	6	30 Jan 1992	Guildhall, Southampton, England	
18	Loss	7–9–2	Steve Lewsam	PTS	8	9 Dec 1991	Winter Gardens, Cleethorpes, England	
17	Loss	7–8–2	Eddy Smulders	TKO	6 (8)	28 Oct 1991	Rijnhal, Arnhem, Netherlands	
16	Loss	7–7–2	Jimmy Peters	PTS	8	11 Sep 1991	Odeon Cinema, Hammersmith, England	
15	Draw	7–6–2	Nick Manners	PTS	8	1 Aug 1991	Leisure Centre, Dewsbury, England	
14	Win	7–6–1	Paul Murray	PTS	6	25 Jul 1991	Town Hall, Dudley, England	
13	Loss	6–6–1	Glenn Campbell	TKO	2 (10), 2:52	17 May 1991	Castle Leisure Centre, Bury, England	For Central Area super-middleweight title
12	Loss	6–5–1	Neville Brown	PTS	6	28 Mar 1991	Leisure Centre, Alfreton, England	
11	Win	6–4–1	Billy Brough	PTS	6	18 Mar 1991	Albany Hotel, Glasgow, Scotland	
10	Loss	5–4–1	Billy Brough	PTS	6	6 Mar 1991	St.Andrew's Sporting Club, Glasgow, Scotland	
9	Loss	5–3–1	Shaun McCrory	PTS	6	6 Feb 1991	Devonshire House Hotel, Liverpool, England	
8	Draw	5–2–1	Darron Griffiths	PTS	6	23 Jan 1991	European SC, Kings Hall, Stoke-on-Trent, England	
7	Win	5–2	Bullit Andrews	TKO	3 (6)	8 Oct 1990	Winter Gardens, Cleethorpes, England	
6	Loss	4–2	Shaun McCrory	PTS	6	5 Sep 1990	European SC, Kings Hall, Stoke-on-Trent, England	
5	Win	4–1	Gary Dyson	PTS	6	5 Jun 1990	Devonshire House Hotel, Liverpool, England	
4	Win	3–1	Tommy Warde	PTS	6	16 May 1990	Grange Park Hotel, Hull, England	
3	Win	2–1	Colin Manners	PTS	6	26 Apr 1990	North Bridge Leisure Centre, Halifax, England	
2	Win	1–1	Mickey Duncan	PTS	6	11 Apr 1990	Leisure Centre, Dewsbury, England	
1	Loss	0–1	Paul Lynch	PTS	6	8 Mar 1990	Leisure Centre, Watford, England	

Sporting positions
Regional boxing titles
Vacant Title last held by Johnny Nelson	Central Area cruiserweight champion 27 April 1995 – June 1996; Vacated	Vacant Title next held by Denzil Browne
