= Neil Simpson (boxer) =

English boxer

Personal information
- Nickname: Simmo
- Born: 5 July 1970 (age 56) London, England
- Height: 6 ft 2 in (188 cm)
- Weight: Light-heavyweight; Cruiserweight

Boxing career
- Reach: 79 in (201 cm)
- Stance: Orthodox

Boxing record
- Total fights: 46
- Wins: 26
- Win by KO: 11
- Losses: 19
- Draws: 1

Neil Simpson (born 5 July 1970) is a British former professional boxer who competed from 1994 to 2009. At regional level, he held the British and Commonwealth light-heavyweight titles between 2000 and 2003, and challenged once for the European light-heavyweight title in 2001.

== Professional career ==
Simpson faced undefeated Derek Chisora on 6 December 2008 at the ExCeL in London. Simpson retired on his stool at the end of the second round.

== Professional boxing record ==
46 fights	26 wins	19 losses
By knockout	11	7
By decision	14	12
By disqualification	1	0
Draws	1	

No.	Result	Record	Opponent	Type	Round, time	Date	Location	Notes
46	Loss	26–19–1	Dean Francis	TKO	3 (3), 0:38	19 May 2009	Earls Court Exhibition Centre, London, England	Prizefighter: The Cruiserweights - Quarter-final
45	Loss	26–18–1	Derek Chisora	RTD	2 (8), 3:00	6 Dec 2008	ExCeL, London, England	
44	Draw	26–17–1	Paul Bonson	PTS	4	3 Oct 2008	Meadowside Leisure Centre, Burton, England	
43	Win	26–17	Nick Okoth	TKO	10 (10), 2:59	1 May 2008	Café Royal, London, England	Won vacant British Masters cruiserweight title
42	Win	25–17	Tony Booth	PTS	4	1 Mar 2008	Leofric Hotel, Coventry, England	
41	Win	24–17	John Anthony	PTS	4	1 Dec 2007	Leofric Hotel, Coventry, England	
40	Win	23–17	Tony Booth	PTS	10	25 Sep 2007	City Hall, Hull, England	
39	Win	22–17	Varuzhan Davtyan	TKO	1 (4), 2:31	18 Mar 2006	Leofric Hotel, Coventry, England	
38	Loss	21–17	Gareth Hogg	PTS	6	10 Feb 2006	The Pavilions, Plymouth, England	
37	Loss	21–16	Leigh Alliss	RTD	3 (8), 3:00	16 Sep 2005	The Pavilions, Plymouth, England	
36	Win	21–15	Paul Bonson	PTS	6	18 Jun 2005	Skydome, Coventry, England	
35	Win	20–15	Hastings Rasani	PTS	6	17 Dec 2004	Sports Centre, Coventry, England	
34	Loss	19–15	Mark Brookes	PTS	10	20 Apr 2004	Octagon Centre, Sheffield, England	
33	Loss	19–14	Peter Oboh	TKO	11 (12), 1:05	8 Mar 2003	AT7 Centre, Coventry, England	For Commonwealth and vacant British light-heavyweight titles
32	Loss	19–13	Tony Oakey	UD	12	25 May 2002	Mountbatten Centre, Portsmouth, England	For WBU light heavyweight title
31	Loss	19–12	Yawe Davis	KO	3 (12)	6 Apr 2001	Grosseto, Italy	For vacant European light-heavyweight title
30	Win	19–11	Hastings Rasani	KO	4 (12), 3:03	2 Jan 2001	Skydome, Coventry, England	Won vacant Commonwealth light-heavyweight title
29	Win	18–11	Mark Delaney	TKO	1 (12)	18 Nov 2000	Goresbrook Leisure Centre, London, England	Retained British light-heavyweight title
28	Win	17–11	Mark Baker	PTS	12	22 May 2000	Skydome, Coventry, England	Won vacant British light-heavyweight title
27	Loss	16–11	Darren Corbett	SD	12	14 Dec 1999	Ryton Sports Connexion, Coventry, England	For IBO Inter-Continental light-heavyweight title
26	Win	16–10	Tony Booth	PTS	10	12 Jul 1999	Ryton Sports Connexion, Coventry, England	
25	Win	15–10	Adam Cale	TKO	3 (6), 2:52	26 Feb 1999	Sports Centre, Coventry, England	
24	Win	14–10	Alvin Miller	KO	3 (6)	30 Nov 1998	Grand Hotel, Leicester, England	
23	Win	13–10	Greg Scott Briggs	PTS	6	11 May 1998	Grand Hotel, Leicester, England	
22	Loss	12–10	Chris Woollas	PTS	6	15 Dec 1997	Beachcomber Club, Humberston, England	
21	Win	12–9	Alvin Miller	RTD	1 (6)	20 Oct 1997	Grand Hotel, Leicester, England	
20	Loss	11–9	Stuart Fleet	PTS	10	25 Apr 1997	Beachcomber Club, Humberston, England	Lost Midlands Area light-heavyweight title
19	Win	11–8	Michael Pinnock	PTS	6	3 Feb 1997	Grand Hotel, Leicester, England	
18	Loss	10–8	Danny Peters	PTS	6	3 Dec 1996	Everton Park Sports Centre, Liverpool, England	
17	Win	10–7	Nigel Rafferty	PTS	8	28 Oct 1996	Leicester, England	
16	Win	9–7	Chris Davies	PTS	4	2 Oct 1996	Welsh Institute of Sport, Cardiff, Wales	
15	Loss	8–7	Dean Francis	TKO	3 (8)	26 Apr 1996	Welsh Institute of Sport, Cardiff, Wales	
14	Win	8–6	Tony Booth	PTS	6	27 Mar 1996	Hermitage Leisure Centre, Whitwick, England	
13	Loss	7–6	Stephen Wilson	PTS	6	19 Feb 1996	St.Andrew's Sporting Club, Glasgow, Scotland	
12	Win	7–5	Greg Scott Briggs	DQ	7 (10)	29 Nov 1995	Conference Centre, Solihull, England	Won vacant Midlands Area light-heavyweight title; Briggs disqualified for biting
11	Win	6–5	Darren Ashton	TKO	3 (6)	11 Oct 1995	Conference Centre, Solihull, England	
10	Loss	5–5	Tony Booth	PTS	8	25 Sep 1995	Winter Gardens, Cleethorpes, England	
9	Win	5–4	Dave Owens	TKO	1 (6), 1:26	24 Jun 1995	Grimsby Auditorium, Cleethorpes, England	
8	Loss	4–4	Andy McVeigh	KO	2 (6), 0:28	11 May 1995	Town Hall, Dudley, England	
7	Loss	4–3	Craig Joseph	PTS	6	26 Apr 1995	Conference Centre, Solihull, England	
6	Loss	4–2	Thomas Hansvoll	PTS	4	17 Mar 1995	K.B. Hallen, Copenhagen, Denmark	
5	Win	4–1	Greg Scott Briggs	RTD	5 (6), 2:00	6 Mar 1995	Colosseum, Leicester, England	
4	Win	3–1	Paul Murray	PTS	6	15 Dec 1994	Saddlers Club, Walsall, England	
3	Loss	2–1	Chris Woollas	PTS	6	5 Dec 1994	Beachcomber Club, Humberston, England	
2	Win	2–0	Johnny Hooks	TKO	2 (6)	20 Oct 1994	Saddlers Club, Walsall, England	
1	Win	1–0	Kenny Nevers	PTS	4	4 Oct 1994	Grosvenor House, London, England	

Sporting positions
Regional boxing titles
Vacant Title last held by John J Cooke	Midlands Area light-heavyweight champion 29 November 1995 – 25 April 1997	Succeeded by Stuart Fleet
Vacant Title last held by Clinton Woods	British light-heavyweight champion 22 May 2000 – March 2003; Vacated	Vacant Title next held by Peter Oboh
Vacant Title last held by Clinton Woods	Commonwealth light-heavyweight champion 2 January 2001– May 2001; Vacated	Vacant Title next held by Tony Oakey
