= Jason DeLisle =

Australian boxer

Personal information
- Nickname: The Nailer
- Nationality: Australian
- Born: 31 May 1972 (age 54) Sydney, Australia
- Height: 5 ft 11 in (180 cm)
- Weight: Super-middleweight; Light-heavyweight

Boxing career
- Reach: 71.5 in (182 cm)
- Stance: Orthodox

Boxing record
- Total fights: 26
- Wins: 18
- Win by KO: 9
- Losses: 6
- Draws: 2

Jason DeLisle (born 31 May 1972, in Sydney) is an Australian former professional boxer who competed from 2000 to 2006. He challenged for the IBF light-heavyweight title in 2006 and made six successful defences of the regional IBF Pan Pacific title.

== Professional career ==
DeLisle finished his boxing career with a final record of 18 wins (9 by knockout), 6 losses, and 2 draws. He won the IBF Pan Pacific light-heavyweight title in 2003 and retained the title six times. In 2006, despite losing an IBF world title #2 ranking eliminator to Julio César González, he challenged champion Clinton Woods in a rematch from their 2004 bout. Woods defeated DeLisle by sixth-round knockout to retain the title.

== Professional boxing record ==
26 fights	18 wins	6 losses
By knockout	9	4
By decision	8	2
By disqualification	1	0
Draws	2	

No.	Result	Record	Opponent	Type	Round, time	Date	Location	Notes
26	Loss	18–6–2	(Australia) Danny Green	KO	9 (12), 1:32	20 Sep 2006	Challenge Stadium, Perth, Australia	Lost IBF Pan Pacific light-heavyweight title; For vacant PABA interim light-heavyweight title
25	Loss	18–5–2	(United Kingdom) Clinton Woods	TKO	6 (12), 1:55	13 May 2006	(United Kingdom) Ponds Forge Arena, Sheffield, England	For IBF light-heavyweight title
24	Loss	18–4–2	(Mexico) Julio César González	UD	12	17 Nov 2005	(United States) HP Pavilion, San Jose, California, U.S.	
23	Win	18–3–2	(Argentina) Fernando Roberto Vera	TD	5 (12)	26 Aug 2005	Panthers World of Entertainment, Penrith, Australia	Retained IBF Pan Pacific light-heavyweight title; Unanimous TD after DeLisle cut
22	Win	17–3–2	(Fiji) Sakeasi Dakua	KO	3 (12), 0:35	22 Apr 2005	Uni of NSW Roundhouse, Kensington, Australia	Retained IBF Pan Pacific light-heavyweight title
21	Win	16–3–2	(Argentina) Juan Eduardo Zabala	DQ	5 (12), 2:13	12 Dec 2004	Panthers World of Entertainment, Penrith, Australia	Retained IBF Pan Pacific light-heavyweight title
20	Loss	15–3–2	(United Kingdom) Clinton Woods	TKO	12 (12), 1:50	24 Oct 2004	(United Kingdom) Octagon Centre, Sheffield, England	
19	Win	15–2–2	(Uruguay) Enrique Campos	TKO	8 (12), 2:05	16 Jul 2004	Panthers World of Entertainment, Penrith, Australia	Retained IBF Pan Pacific light-heavyweight title
18	Win	14–2–2	(United Kingdom) Justin Clements	KO	1 (12), 2:13	28 May 2004	Panthers World of Entertainment, Penrith, Australia	Retained IBF Pan Pacific light-heavyweight title
17	Win	13–2–2	(Australia) Jamie Guy	TKO	4 (12)	5 Dec 2003	Panthers World of Entertainment, Penrith, Australia	Retained IBF Pan Pacific light-heavyweight title
16	Win	12–2–2	(Australia) John Wyborn	UD	12	19 Sep 2003	Panthers World of Entertainment, Penrith, Australia	Won IBF Pan Pacific light-heavyweight title
15	Loss	11–2–2	(Australia) Danny Green	KO	5 (12)	2 Jun 2003	Panthers World of Entertainment, Penrith, Australia	For IBF Pan Pacific and vacant OPBF super-middleweight titles
14	Win	11–1–2	(Australia) Paul Smallman	TKO	11 (12)	13 Apr 2004	Sports Complex, Carrara, Australia	Retained Australian light-heavyweight title
13	Win	10–1–2	(Australia) Peter Manesis	SD	12	13 Dec 2002	Gardens Racecourse, Rosehill, Australia	Retained Australian light-heavyweight title
12	Win	9–1–2	(Tanzania) Brown Enyi	UD	6	18 Sep 2002	Hordern Pavilion, Moore Park, Australia	
11	Loss	8–1–2	(Australia) Paul Smallman	MD	8	2 Sep 2002	E.G. Whitlam Recreation Center, Liverpool, Australia	
10	Win	8–0–2	(Kenya) Kariz Kariuki	UD	12	2 Aug 2002	Le Montage Function Centre, Sydney, Australia	Won vacant Australian light-heavyweight title
9	Win	7–0–2	(Samoa) Jeff Tupu	UD	8	6 Apr 2002	Town Hall, Rockdale, Australia	
8	Win	6–0–2	(Kenya) Kariz Kariuki	SD	6	28 Sep 2001	The Octagon, Sydney, Australia	
7	Win	5–0–2	(New Zealand) Supi Moi Moi	TKO	2 (6)	29 Aug 2001	South Junior Rugby League Club, Sydney, Australia	
6	Draw	4–0–2	(Kenya) Kariz Kariuki	PTS	6	13 Jul 2001	The Octagon, Sydney, Australia	
5	Win	4–0–1	(Samoa) Jeff Tupu	PTS	6	20 Apr 2001	Le Montage Function Centre, Sydney, Australia	
4	Draw	3–0–1	(Ukraine) Andriy Khamula	TD	2 (6)	2 Mar 2001	Star City Casino, Sydney, Australia	
3	Win	3–0	(Fiji) Sunia Rautava	TKO	4 (6)	9 Feb 2001	Le Montage Function Centre, Sydney, Australia	
2	Win	2–0	(Australia) Frank Ciampa	TKO	3 (6)	3 Nov 2000	Star City Casino, Sydney, Australia	
1	Win	1–0	(Australia) Adam King	TKO	1 (6)	11 Aug 2000	Enmore Theatre, Sydney, Australia	

Sporting positions
Regional boxing titles
Vacant Title last held by Kariz Kariuki	Australian light-heavyweight champion 2 August 2002 - July 2003; Vacated	Vacant Title next held by Marc Bargero
Preceded by John Wyborn	IBF Pan Pacific light-heavyweight champion 19 September 2003 – 20 September 2006	Succeeded by Danny Green
