= Ali Forbes =

English boxer (born 1961)

Personal information
- Nationality: British
- Born: 7 March 1959 (age 67) London, England
- Height: 5 ft 9 in (1.75 m)
- Weight: Super middleweight, light heavyweight

Boxing career
- Stance: Orthodox

Boxing record
- Total fights: 25
- Wins: 14
- Win by KO: 7
- Losses: 10
- Draws: 1

Ali Forbes (born 7 March 1961) is a British former boxer who was British super middleweight champion in 1995 and fought for the World Boxing Federation light heavyweight world title in 2000.

== Career ==
Born in London, Ali Forbes began his professional career in February 1989 at the age of 28 with a win over David Haycock. Unbeaten in his first seven fights he suffered his first defeat in March 1992 when he challenged Ian Strudwick for the BBBofC Southern Area super middleweight title, losing on points. When Strudwick vacated the title Forbes got a second chance in March 1994 against Richard Bustin, this time winning on points.

In January 1995 he beat Fidel Castro Smith on points at the York Hall to become British super middleweight champion. His first defence came three months later against Sam Storey and Storey took the title on points.

Forbes was out of the ring for three years but returned in May 1998 with a win over Darren Ashton. Six months later he faced David Starie for Starie's commonwealth title and the British title vacated by Dean Francis; Starie knocked Forbes out in the eleventh round.

Forbes moved up to light heavyweight and his next fight came in December 1999, a points defeat to Mark Delaney. In March 2000, he challenged for Mark Baker's WBF World light heavyweight title, losing on points. He then suffered defeats to Juan Nelongo (for the WBA inter-continental title), Thomas Ulrich, and Clinton Woods (for the vacant WBC International light heavyweight title, Forbes a late substitute for Michael Nunn). He had four further fights—two wins and two defeats—before retiring in 2002.

Since retiring, Forbes has worked as a trainer and has been involved in fundraising for the Tenterden Amateur Boxing Club, Pedro Amateur Boxing Club, and Beckley Park Cricket Club.
