= David Starie =

British boxer

Personal information
- Nickname: Jedi
- Nationality: British
- Born: 11 June 1974 (age 52) Bury Saint Edmunds, Suffolk, England
- Height: 6 ft 0 in (183 cm)
- Weight: Super middleweight; Light heavyweight

Boxing career
- Reach: 76 in (193 cm)

Boxing record
- Total fights: 35
- Wins: 31
- Win by KO: 24
- Losses: 4

David Starie (born 11 June 1974) is a British former professional boxer who competed from 1994 to 2003. He challenged twice for world championships; the WBO super middleweight title in 2000 and the unified WBA (Super) and IBF super middleweight titles in 2003. At regional level, he held the British super middleweight title twice; first in 1997 and again from 1998 to 2001, and also held the Commonwealth super middleweight title from 1998 to 2002.

== Professional career ==
Known as "Jedi", Starie won the British super middleweight title when he stopped Sam Storey in 1997. Starie was stopped three months later by Dean Francis.

In March 1998, he won the Commonwealth super middleweight title, beating Clinton Woods on points. Starie regained the British super middleweight title in November 1998 when he knocked out Ali Forbes to win the vacant title.

In January 2000, he fought Joe Calzaghe for the WBO super middleweight title, losing on points.

In 2003, he vacated the British super middleweight title and lost his Commonwealth super middleweight title on points to Andre Thysse.

In June 2003, Starie fought for the WBA (Super) and IBF and super middleweight titles, losing on points, again, to Sven Ottke. This was to be Starie's last fight in the ring. He announced his retirement in August 2003.

== Life after boxing ==
Starie is now a full-time firefighter, after doing part-time work in this capacity during his boxing career.

In 2012, he was appointed fire liaison officer at West Suffolk College, working with young males identified as needing positive role models. Outside of his work with the college, Starie participated in several challenges for charity, acted as an instructor at the Eastgate Amateur Boxing Club and also organised a running club for young people in Bury St Edmunds.

Back in June 2006, Starie had talked about returning to the ring. Promoters and the British Boxing Board of Control told him that he was likely to need only two warm-up fights before being offered a shot at the British super middleweight title, which he vacated following his retirement, but no fights were made.

In May 2013, he announced a comeback, hopefully during the Prizefighter series, after discussing a deal with Eddie Hearn of Matchroom Promotions. In July 2014, Starie was in training, with the hope of fighting for the Commonwealth or British title, but once again the comeback didn't materialise.

== Amateur accomplishments ==
- 1993 ABA Light Middleweight Champion
- 1994 ABA Middleweight Champion
- David had 67 amateur boxing bouts winning 55 and losing 12. His Amateur Championships successes include :a National Schools Championship in 1990; an ABA Junior Championship in 1990 ; a National Association of Boys Club Class B title in 1991; and a National Association of Boys Club Class C Championship in 1992.
- On the way to winning the Senior Amateur Boxing Association light middleweight title with a KO win over Welsh boxer Craig Winter in 1993 he outpointed Bristol's Glen Catley who later won a professional WBC World title at Middleweight. in progressing to the ABA Senior Middleweight title with a points win over Jersey boxer Eddie Stuart he stopped Hackneys Jason Matthews who later as a professional won a WBO world title .
