= Winter Gardens, Cleethorpes =

Former entertainment venue on the sea front in Cleethorpes, England

Winter Gardens
- Interactive map of Winter Gardens
- Location: Kingsway, Cleethorpes, North East Lincolnshire, England
- Coordinates: 53°33′07″N 0°01′07″W
- Owner: North East Lincolnshire Council
- Capacity: 800
- Type: Entertainment complex
- Events: Music, Dancing, Nightclub

Construction
- Opened: 1934
- Closed: 2007
- Demolished: 2007

The Winter Gardens in Cleethorpes, England, was an entertainment venue on the town's sea front. It accommodated over 500 people and held conference, dance, dinner and live band events.

== History ==
Design commenced for the venue as an amusement hall in the 1920s. It started out as the art deco style Olympia in 1934, and it was built with compensation which local railway worker George Eyre received from an accident which resulted in his legs being amputated. George's wife, Rose, owned the land on which Olympia was erected. After the post-war refurbishment in December 1947, the establishment was reopened as the Winter Gardens. The Winter Gardens held a range of events including rock gigs, a Melody Night and a Tea Dance.

On 15 August 2013, plans were unveiled for a £3.5-million housing development on the former Winter Gardens site in Cleethorpes.

== Entertainment ==
=== Music and showmanship ===
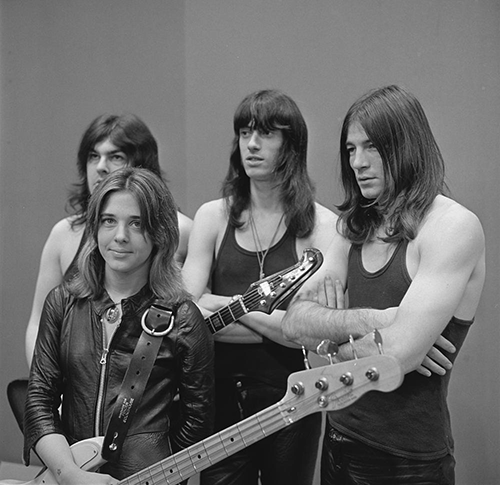
Suzi Quatro

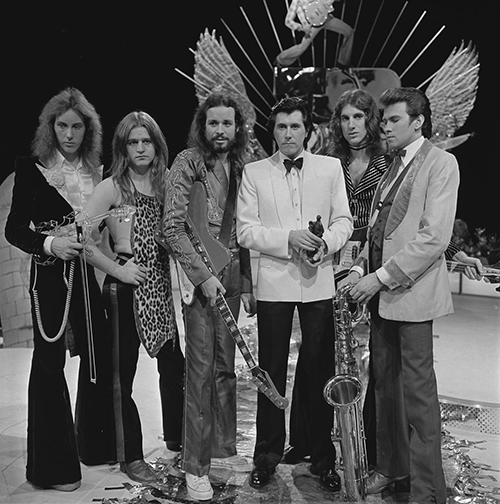
Roxy Music

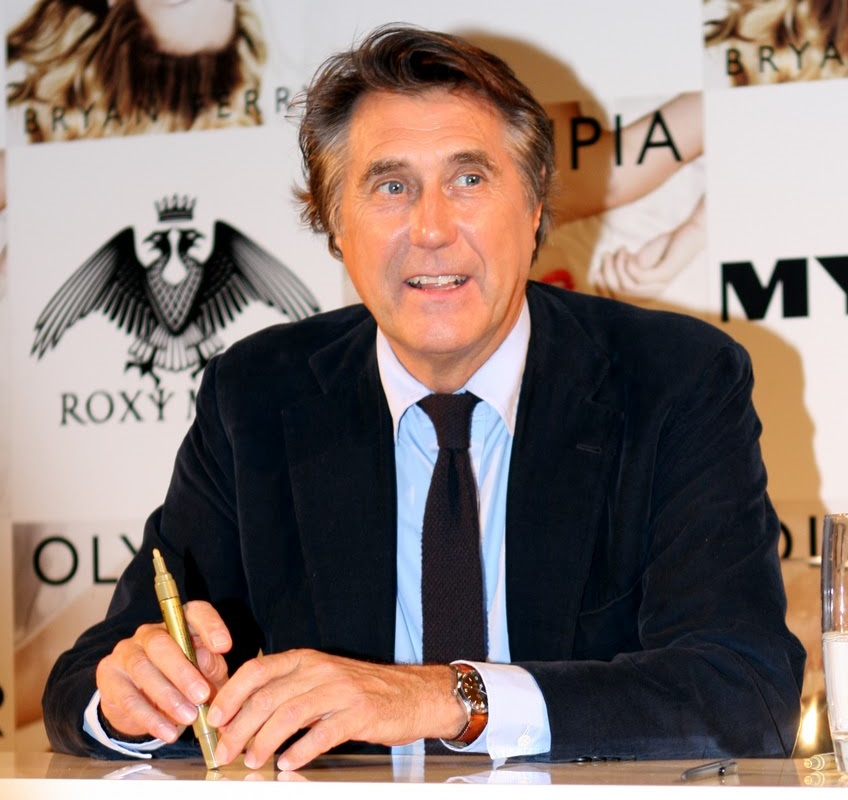
Bryan Ferry

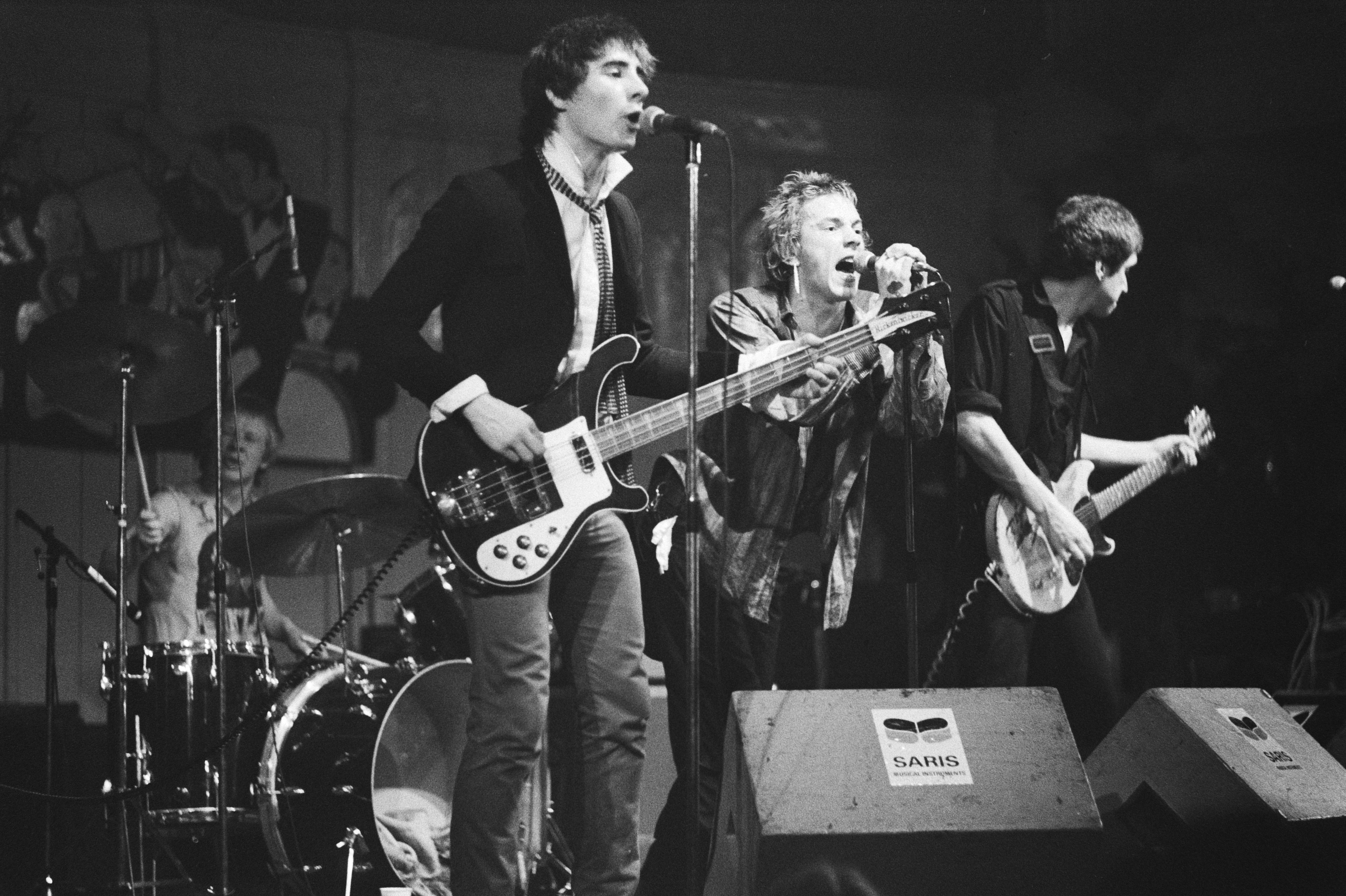
Sex Pistols

The Hamsters

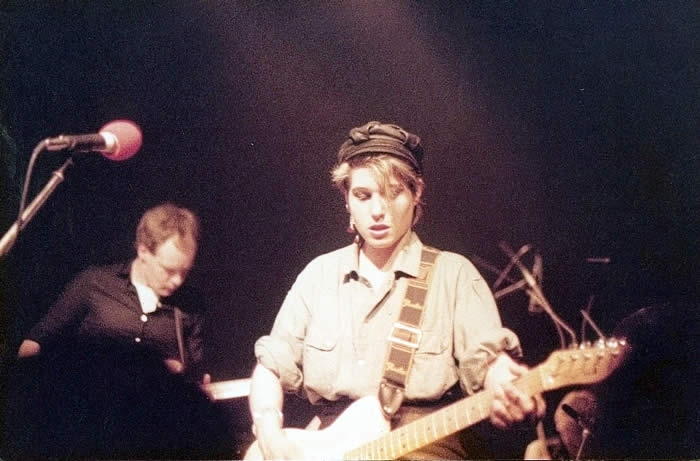
Brix Smith

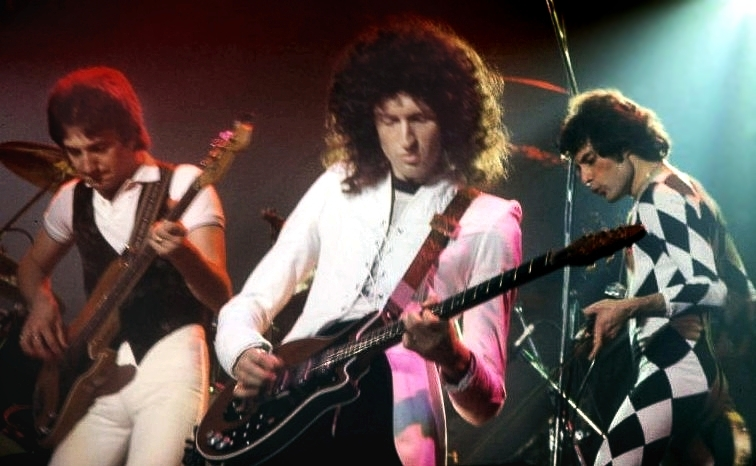
Queen

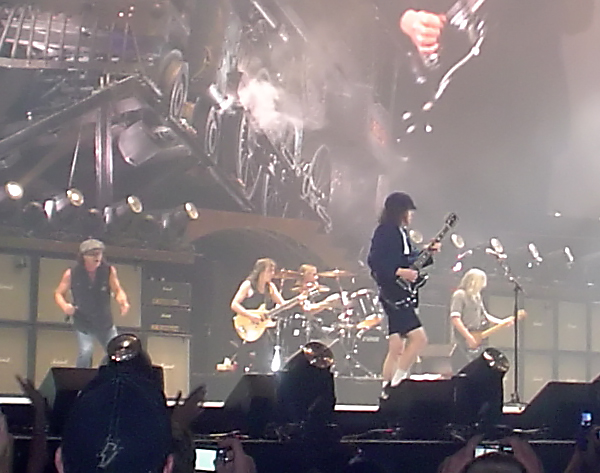
AC DC

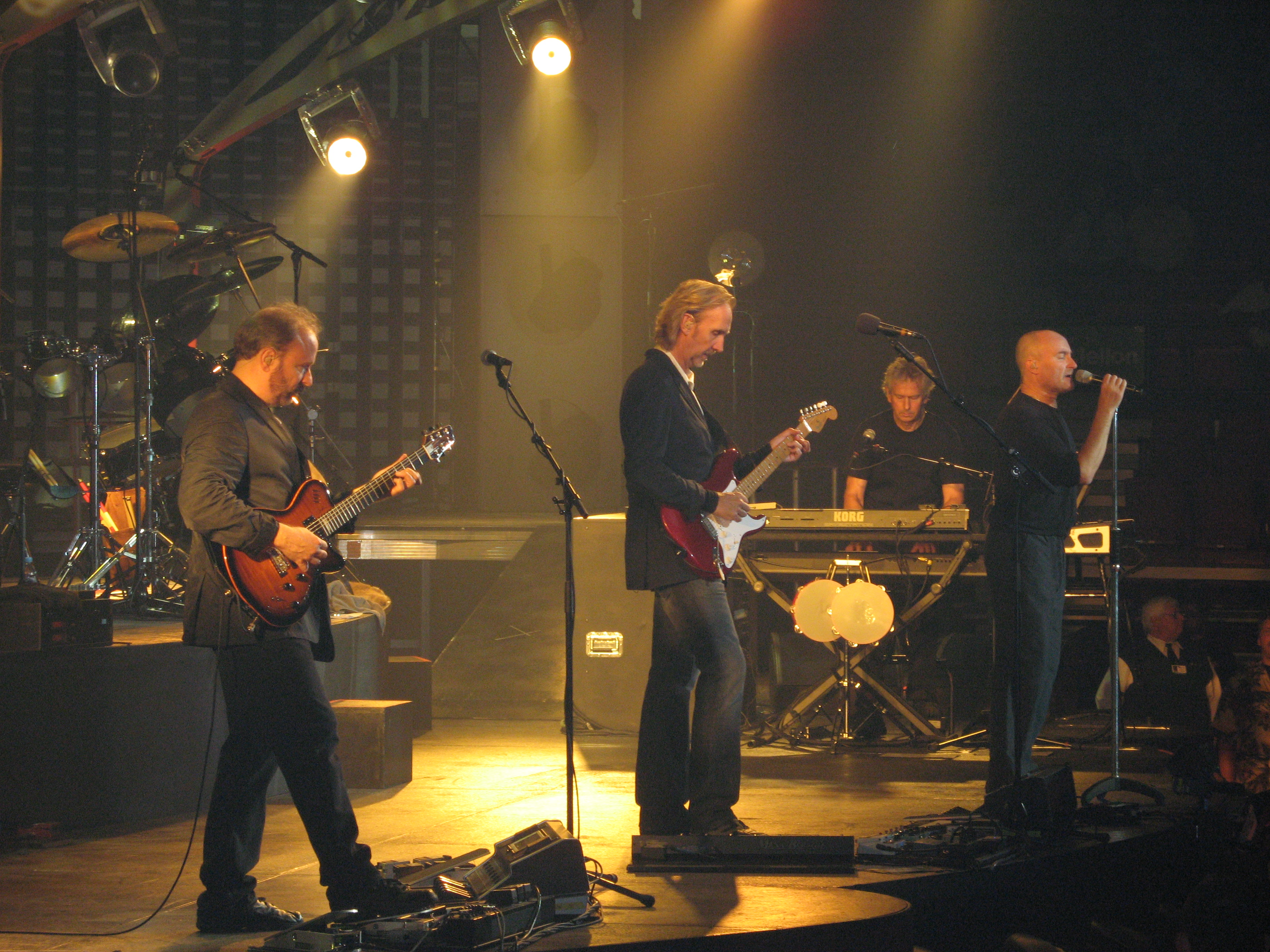
Genesis

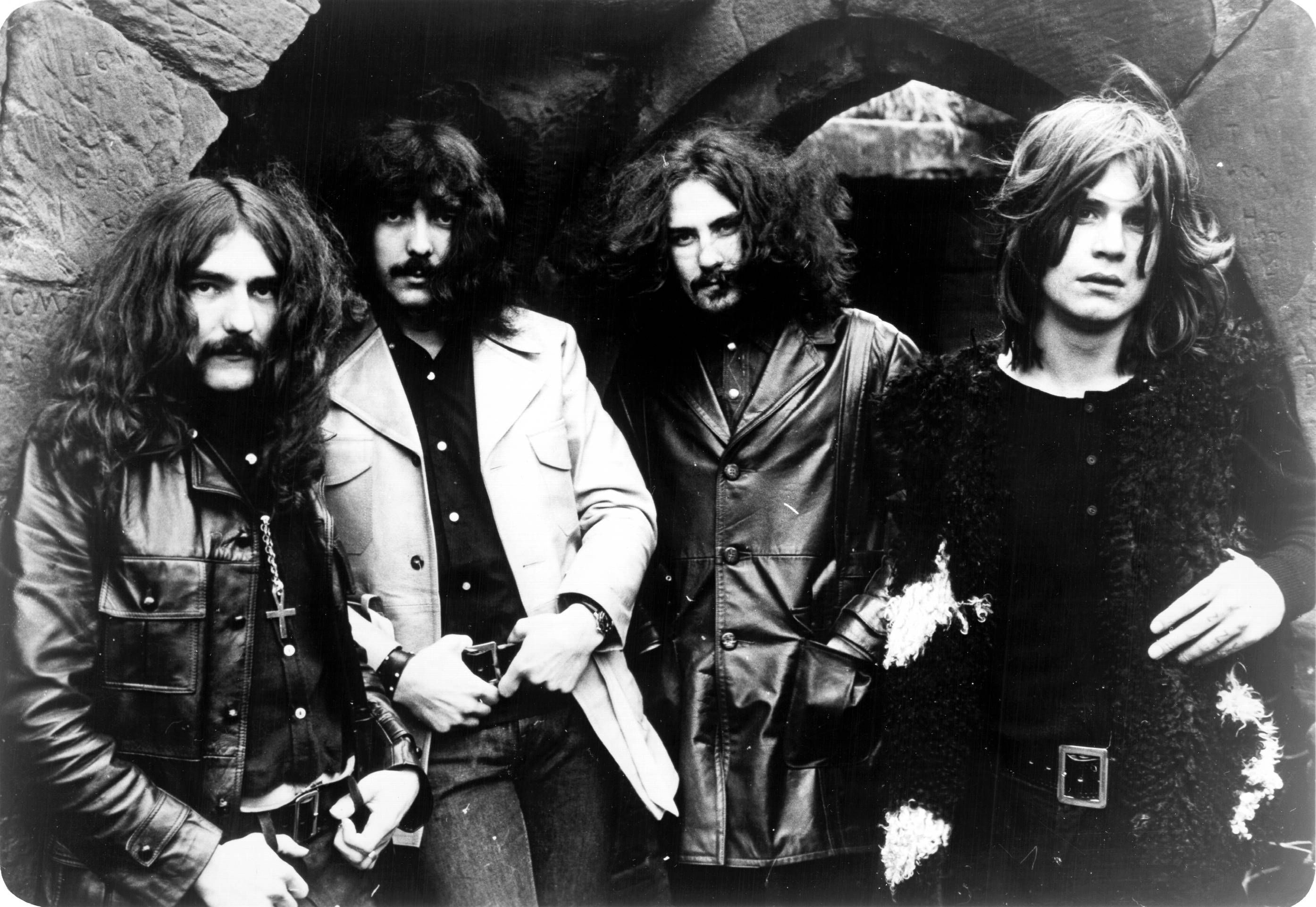
Black Sabbath

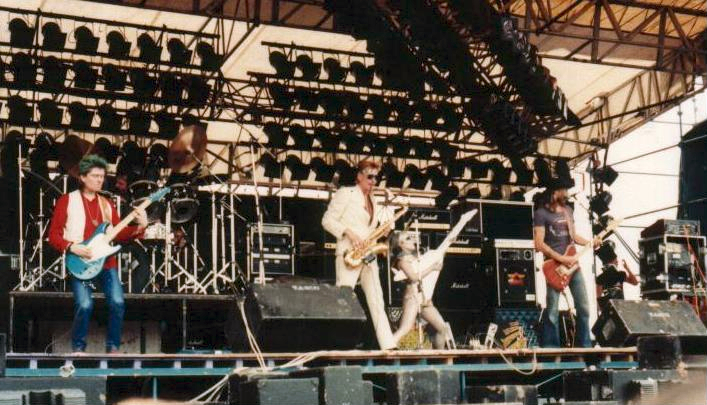
Hawkwind

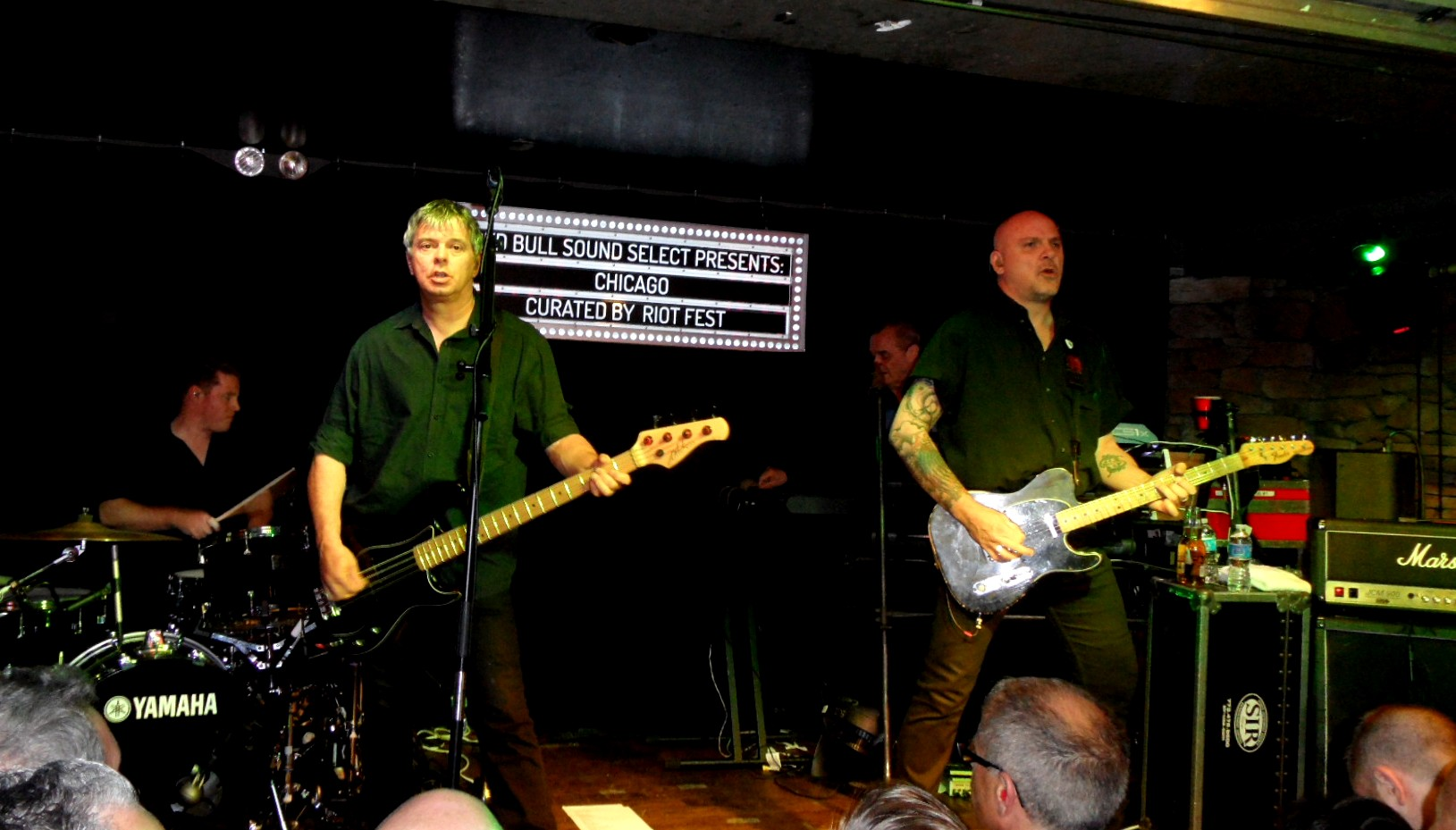
The Stranglers

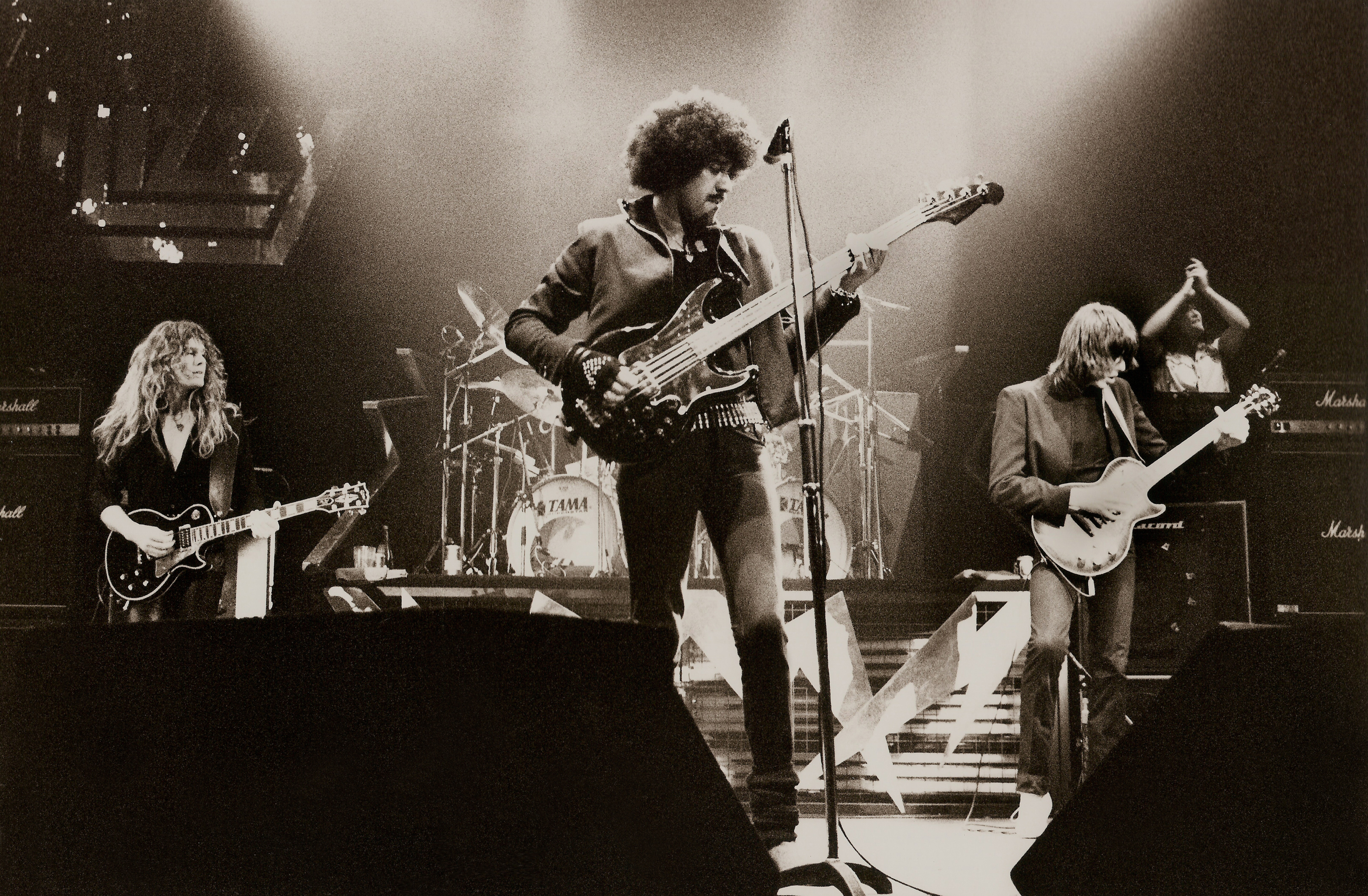
Thin Lizzy

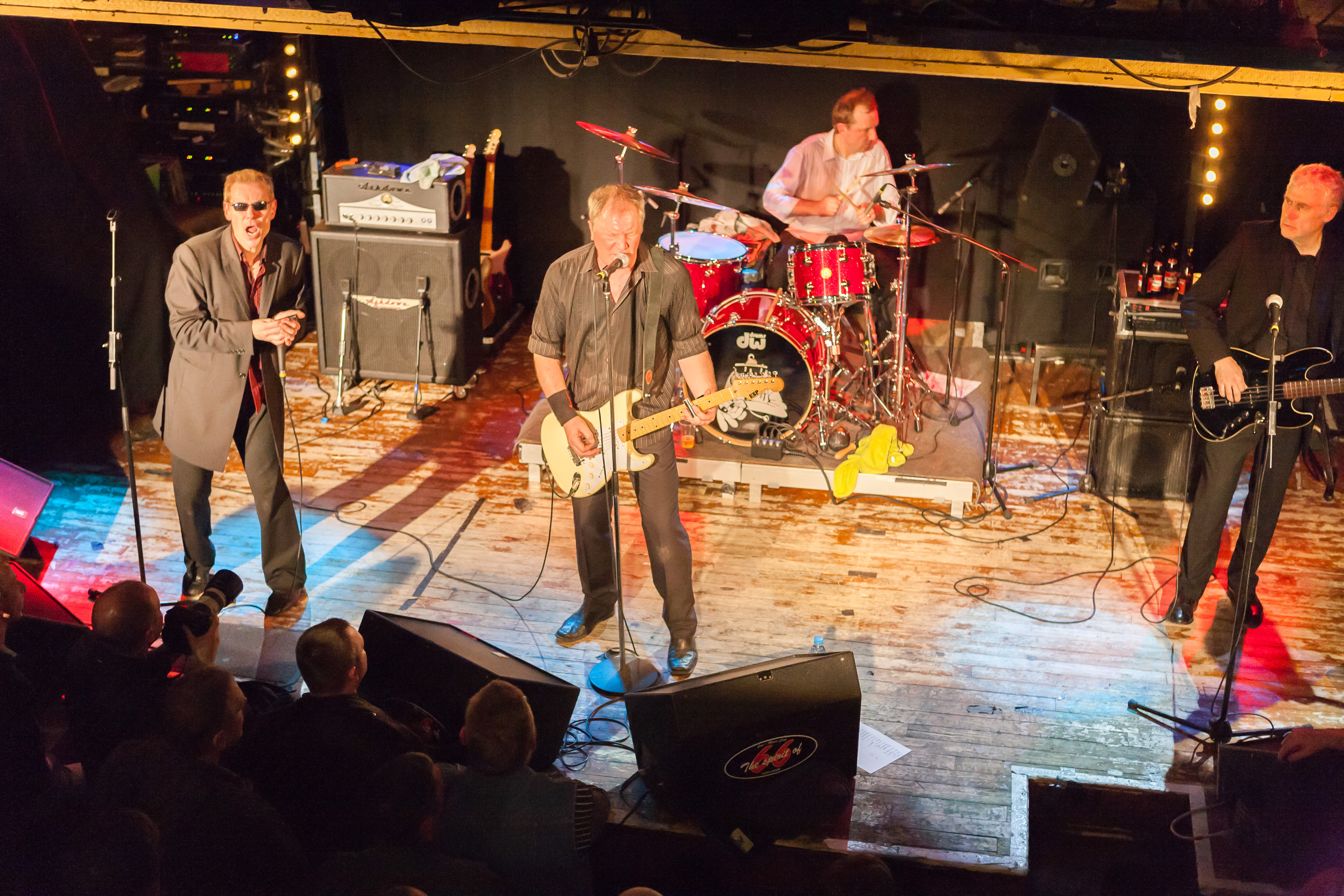
Doctor Feelgood

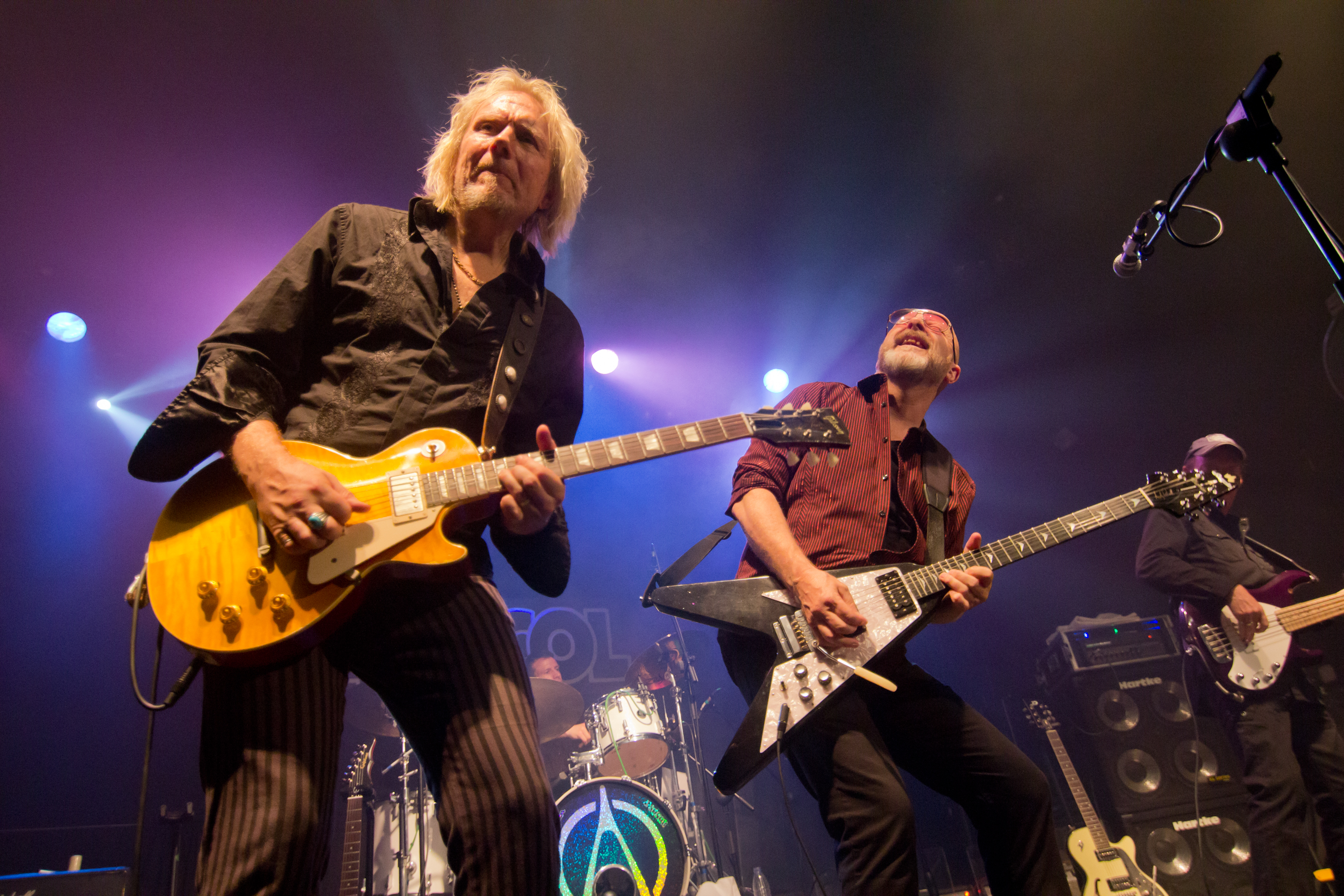
Wishbone Ash

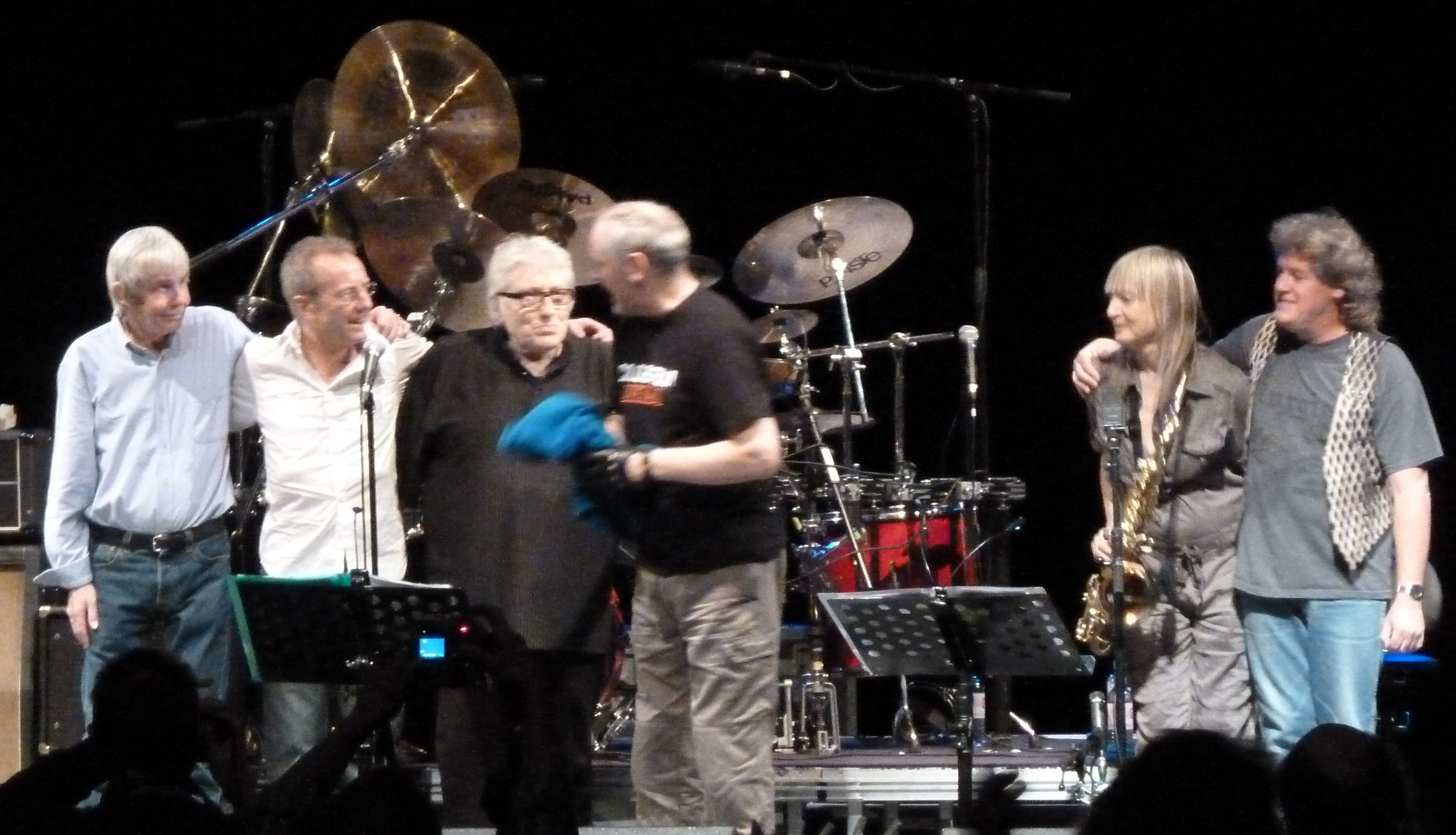
Colosseum

Winter Gardens stars

Musicians that played the venue include The Angelic Upstarts, AC/DC, Black Sabbath, Brix, Caravan, The Clash, Colosseum, Dexys Midnight Runners, Dr. Feelgood, The Damned, Edgar Broughton Band, Egg, Family, Free, Genesis, The Hamsters, Hawkwind, The Heartbreakers, Elton John, Judas Priest, Suzi Quattro, Queen, Roxy Music with Bryan Ferry, The Skids, the Sex Pistols, The Stranglers, Taste, Thin Lizzy, and Wishbone Ash, some of these up-and-coming during the late 1960s and early 1970s.

Annual folk festivals were hosted for many years, featuring concerts, ceilidhs, craft stalls, and workshops and performances by local dance teams. One of the most popular events was presented by the Colin Chamley Band along with local singer Sandra Browne.

Northern soul events also took place at the winter gardens and established it as one of the major venues for Northern Soul in the UK and up there with Wigan Casino and The Twisted Wheel.

Melody Night took place every Wednesday evening, through to 2 am, and was famous throughout the county of Lincolnshire and beyond, thanks to the local economy needing to bring in contractors from all over the country. However its nickname of "The Bags Ball" or "Widows Ball" still lives in the memory of those that frequented it, much more than its official name of "Melody Night".

It also became notable during the early 1990s through to 2001 with the rise of the house music scene, drawing visitors from across the United Kingdom, holding monthly events such as After Eight & Democracy 1994–1997. Showcasing International and National acts such as Lenny Fontana, Liberty City, Murk, Allister Whitehead, Alison Limerick, CeCe Rogers, Paul Oakenfold, Sasha, Boy George, Mark Moore, Jeremy Healy, Tony DeVitt to say a few while the Promotor also ran monthly Stately Home events in Lincolnshire with similar renowned talent becoming one of the rising Promoters competing with the likes of Hard Times and Cream and attracted music journos from Mixmag, DJ Mag and as far as Miami and France Journos.

Freedom, which saw the likes of Italian duo Fulvio Perniola and Gianni Bini of the production team Fathers of Sound, Nigel Benn, JFK, Chris & James, Renaissance (club) DJ's Ian Ossia and Nigel Dawson playing there.

=== Sport ===
Boxing
On 28 February 1939, Olympia as the Winter Gardens was known then held its first boxing event in association with the British Boxing Board of Control (BBBofC). Many boxing matches have been held in Winter Gardens main room since the late 1970s. Local Grimsby boxing promoter Joe Frater, who was the first black promoter at the time, he organized dinners and many sell out boxing events over the years.

Football
Former Grimsby Town player Dave Boylen held sports dinner charity events for the Artie White Foundation at the Winter Gardens since 1997, which saw the likes of Denis Law attend the venue. Other famous footballers included the likes of George Best, Bobby Charlton and his brother Jack Charlton, Geoff Hurst, Nobby Stiles to attend the venue.

Horse Racing
Three-times Grand National winner, Red Rum made two guest appearances at the Winter Gardens.

Wrestling
were held annually Winter Gardens has played host to a number of professional wrestling events from 2003 to 2006 under Frontier Wrestling Alliance (FWA), local Grimsby wrestler Stevie Knight competed many times there.

== Demolition ==
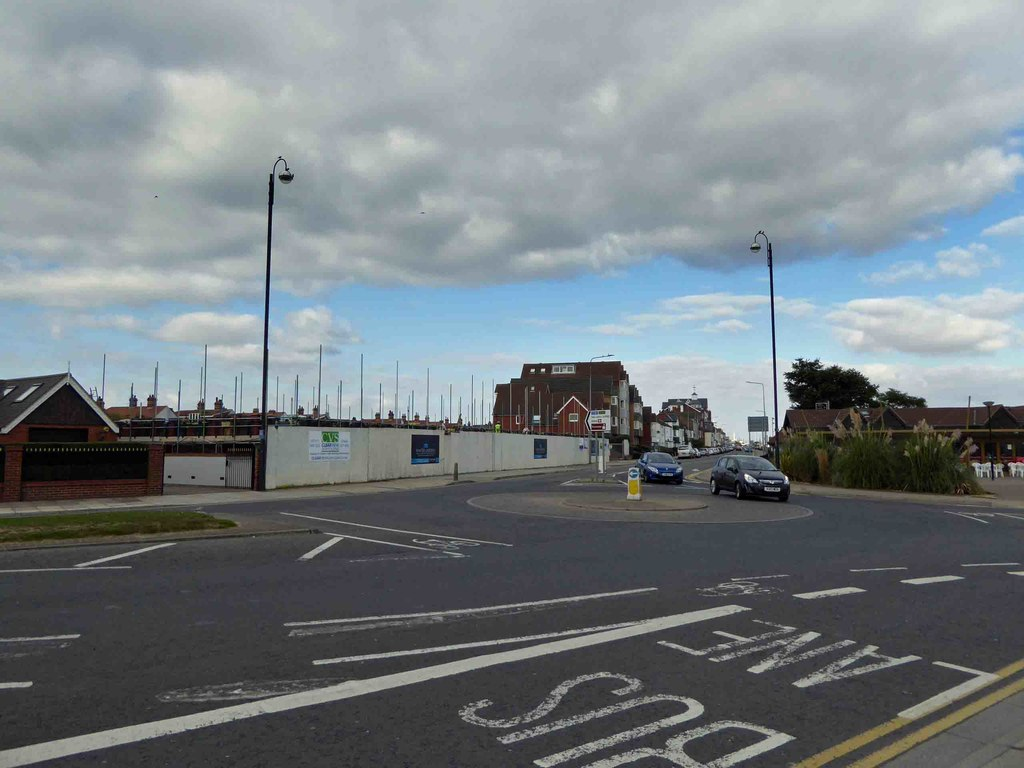
Construction of new apartments begun in June 2015 on the site of the former Winter Gardens

After many years of entertainment The Winter Gardens were closed for good on 15 February 2007. Demolition started in the summer of 2007 through a decision made by North East Lincolnshire Council the previous February. Prior to demolition there had been local representations for and against closure.

After demolition an apartment development began on the site, but was halted because of the economic downturn. In June 2013 the site was still empty, being used as a car park at £4 a day. Work started on the 25 apartments development in June 2015. First phase of the Winter Gardens land redevelopment was completed by April 2018, which consists of three-story town houses.
